= Jak Crawford =

American racing driver (born 2005)

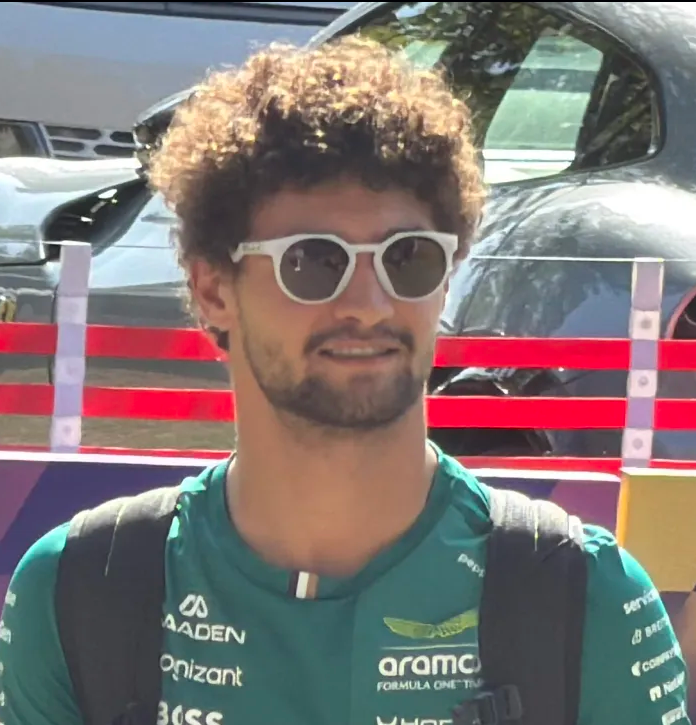
- Crawford at the 2026 Australian Grand Prix
- Nationality: (United States) American
- Born: Carlton Jakston Crawford; 2 May 2005 (age 21) Charlotte, North Carolina, U.S.

FIA Formula 2 Championship career
- Debut season: 2023
- Car number: 11
- Former teams: Hitech Pulse-Eight, DAMS Lucas Oil
- Starts: 80
- Wins: 6
- Podiums: 19
- Poles: 3
- Fastest laps: 1
- Best finish: 2nd in 2025

Previous series
- 2023–2025 2023 2022 2021–2022 2021 2020 2020 2018–19: FIA Formula 2 FR Middle East Championship; FR Asian Championship; FIA Formula 3 Euroformula Open Championship; ADAC Formula 4 Italian F4 Championship; NACAM Formula 4 Championship

Carlton Jakston "Jak" Crawford (born 2 May 2005) is an American racing driver who last competed in the 2025 FIA Formula 2 Championship for DAMS as part of the AMF1 Driver Development Programme. He currently serves as the reserve driver for Aston Martin in Formula One.

Born in Charlotte, North Carolina, Crawford began karting age five before moving to single-seaters in 2020, becoming that year's runner-up in ADAC Formula 4. Crawford spent two years in FIA Formula 3 in 2021 and 2022, finishing seventh in the latter with Prema. He moved up to FIA Formula 2 and spent three years there from 2023 to 2025, finishing runner-up in the latter with DAMS.

Crawford was previously a member of the Red Bull Junior Team from 2020 to 2023.

== Career ==
=== Karting ===
Crawford was born in Charlotte, North Carolina on 2 May 2005, and started his karting career in 2011 after he moved to the Houston, Texas area. He competed in multiple championships, predominantly in North America, winning the Challenge of the Americas – Junior Rotax Series among others. In Crawford's first overseas karting race in 2014 at the Rok Cup International Championship, while only nine years old, he finished second. Other international karting competitions were mostly sporadic but generally successful. Crawford achieved more glory in the later part of his karting career, included a win during the 2016 Florida Winter Tour, and further triumphs in the 2017 SKUSA SuperNationals and the Challenge of the Americas.

=== Formula 4 ===
==== 2018–2019 ====
In 2018, Crawford made his car racing debut in the NACAM Formula 4 Championship, driving for Scuderia Martiga EG. He took the standings lead following three rounds after two wins and finishing all but two races on the podium. However, he went winless for the next two rounds, losing the lead back to title rival Manuel Sulaimán. Despite winning four of the final six races, Crawford finished runner-up to Sulaimán by 44 points.

==== 2020 ====
Crawford raced in the German and Italian Formula 4 Championships in 2020 with Van Amersfoort Racing, however, due to the COVID-19 pandemic he would only compete part-time in the latter. In ADAC F4, Crawford took both poles for the opening weekend in Lausitzring, but lost both to teammate and Red Bull Junior Team member Jonny Edgar in the races. Following a trio of second places in the next two rounds, Crawford took his first win from pole position during the first race in Nürburgring despite late rainfall. He then locked out the podium in the following round at the Red Bull Ring, which included a win during the final race. A win in the second Lausitzring round slashed Edgar's points lead heading into the season finale. There, Crawford took the title lead by winning the first two races in Oschersleben, but lost the title by two points by finishing sixth in the final race, as to Edgar's second place. Nevertheless, Crawford finished runner-up in the standings, scoring five wins and twelve podiums throughout the season.

In the Italian championship, Crawford did not compete in the opening Misano round, but raced in Imola took two podiums. He would take his first Italian F4 win in Austria, and secured another triumph in the second Imola round on a weekend where he locked out the podium. Despite missing two rounds, Crawford still placed sixth in the championship standings, with two wins and seven podiums.

=== Road to Indy ===
==== U.S. F2000 ====
In April 2019, Crawford joined DEForce Racing to contest part of the 2019 season as he was not old enough to start the racing season. In July, he switched to Cape Motorsports to contest the final five rounds and ended the season seventh in the standings.

=== Euroformula Open ===
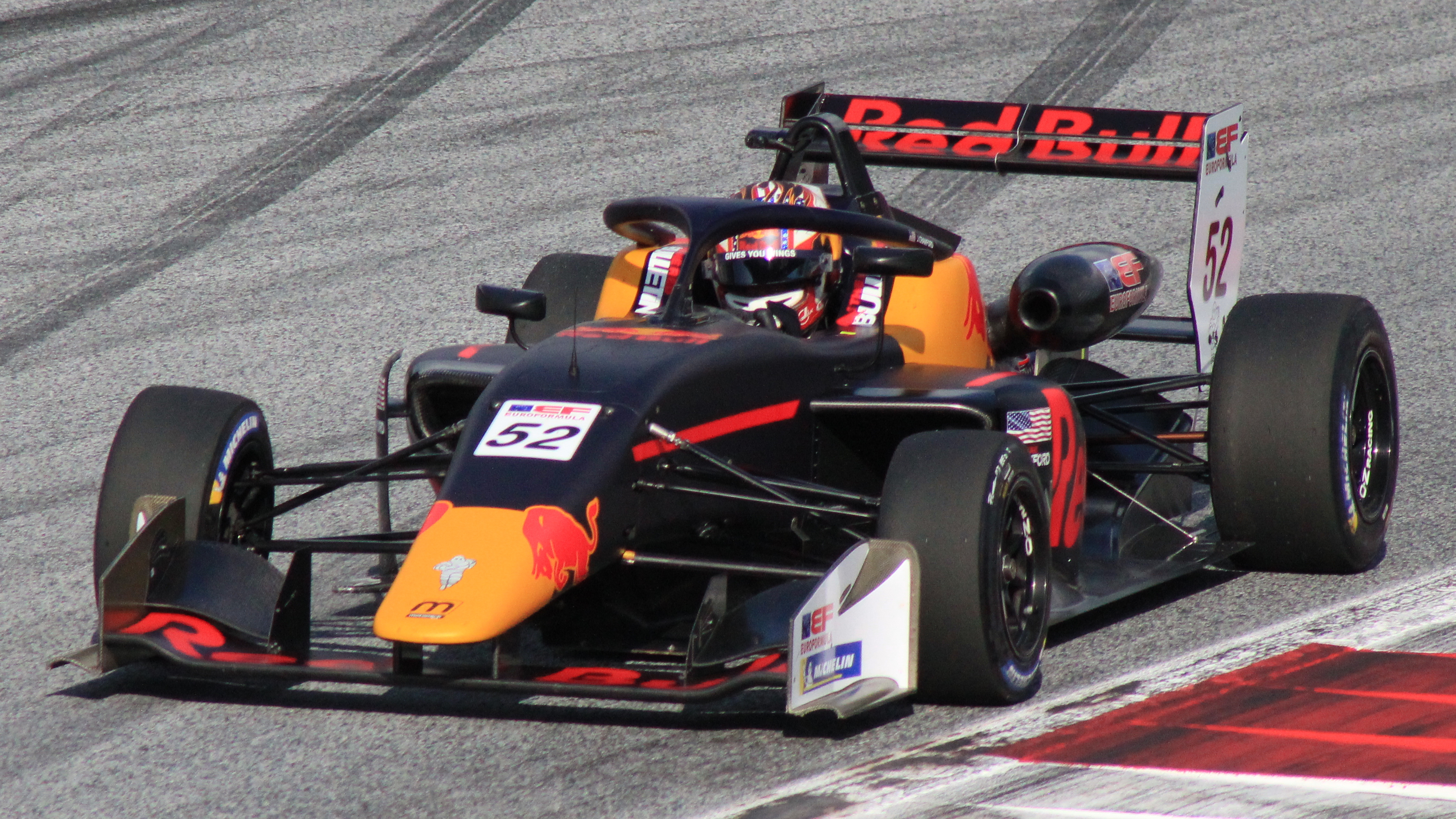
Crawford at the 2021 Euroformula Open

In March 2021, it was announced Crawford would race with Motopark in the 2021 season alongside his FIA Formula 3 commitments. Crawford missed the first two races of the season at Algarve due to his age, but stunned during his first full round in Paul Ricard with two wins and a further second place. He took another double victory in Imola, and repeated this feat at the Red Bull Ring and the Barcelona finale. Despite missing two rounds that season, Crawford finished third in the standings, eleven points behind runner-up Louis Foster. Speaking about his campaign mid-season, Crawford stated that Euroformula had helped him "get up to speed" in Formula 3.

=== Formula Regional ===
==== 2022 ====
In January 2022, Crawford took part in the Formula Regional Asian Championship with Prema ahead of their FIA Formula 3 campaign together. He took his first podium of the season in the opening at Yas Marina, holding off Isack Hadjar for second place. After scoring more points in the following two rounds at Dubai, he took another second place during the third Dubai round, and a third podium in the final round placed Crawford sixth in the overall standings with 113 points.

==== 2023 ====
Crawford was set to partook in three rounds in the 2023 Formula Regional Middle East Championship with Hitech Grand Prix before his main 2023 campaign. He instead only competed in one round, taking a best finish of eighth place and placed 28th in the standings with four points.

=== FIA Formula 3 Championship ===
==== 2021 ====
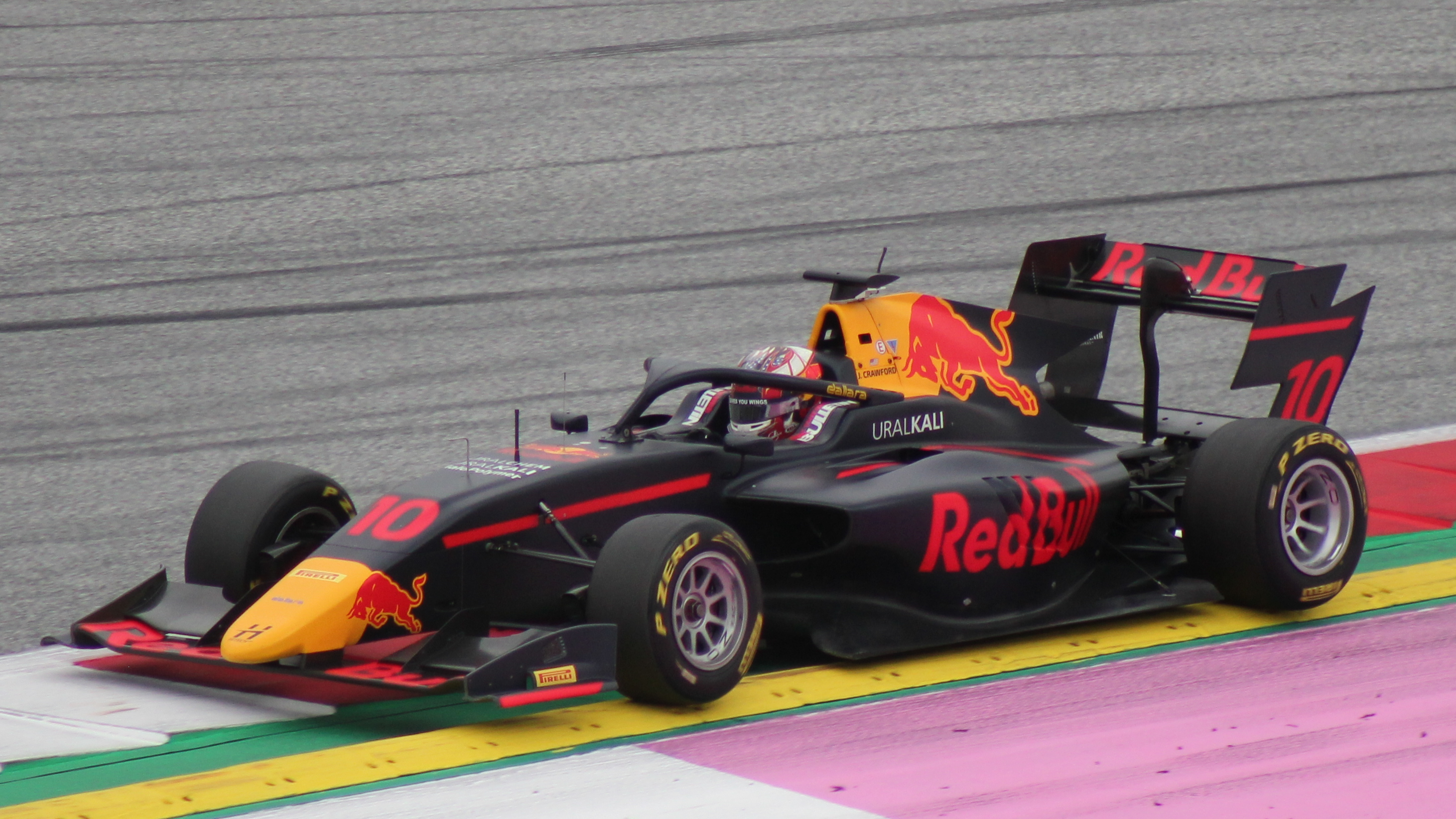
Crawford driving the Dallara F3 2019 during the 2021 Spielberg Formula 3 round

In October 2020, Crawford completed the first post-season test at Catalunya, running for Hitech GP. Later that month, the British outfit once again fielded Crawford in the second post-season test at Jerez and confirmed him for the 2021 season in January the following year. He had a solid start to his season, scoring two points finishes in the opening two rounds. In Austria during Race 2, Crawford moved up to second early on, but his race concluded mid-race after his engine shut off. The next day, Crawford had another promising race running in the top-five, but a failed overtake on Jack Doohan saw him break his front wing with three laps to go. He again failed to score in Budapest after qualifying down in 22nd. During Race 1 in Spa-Francorchamps, Crawford earned his breakthrough with a maiden podium during treacherous conditions. In Zandvoort, Crawford had a decent weekend by scoring points in all three races, including a fourth place in the first race. In Sochi, Crawford ran as high as third in Race 1, but struggled with tyre degradation and eventually slipped out of the points. However, he had a stronger race in Race 3, finishing in fifth place. Crawford finished the year thirteenth in the drivers' standings with 45 points, behind teammate Ayumu Iwasa but ahead of Roman Staněk.

==== 2022 ====
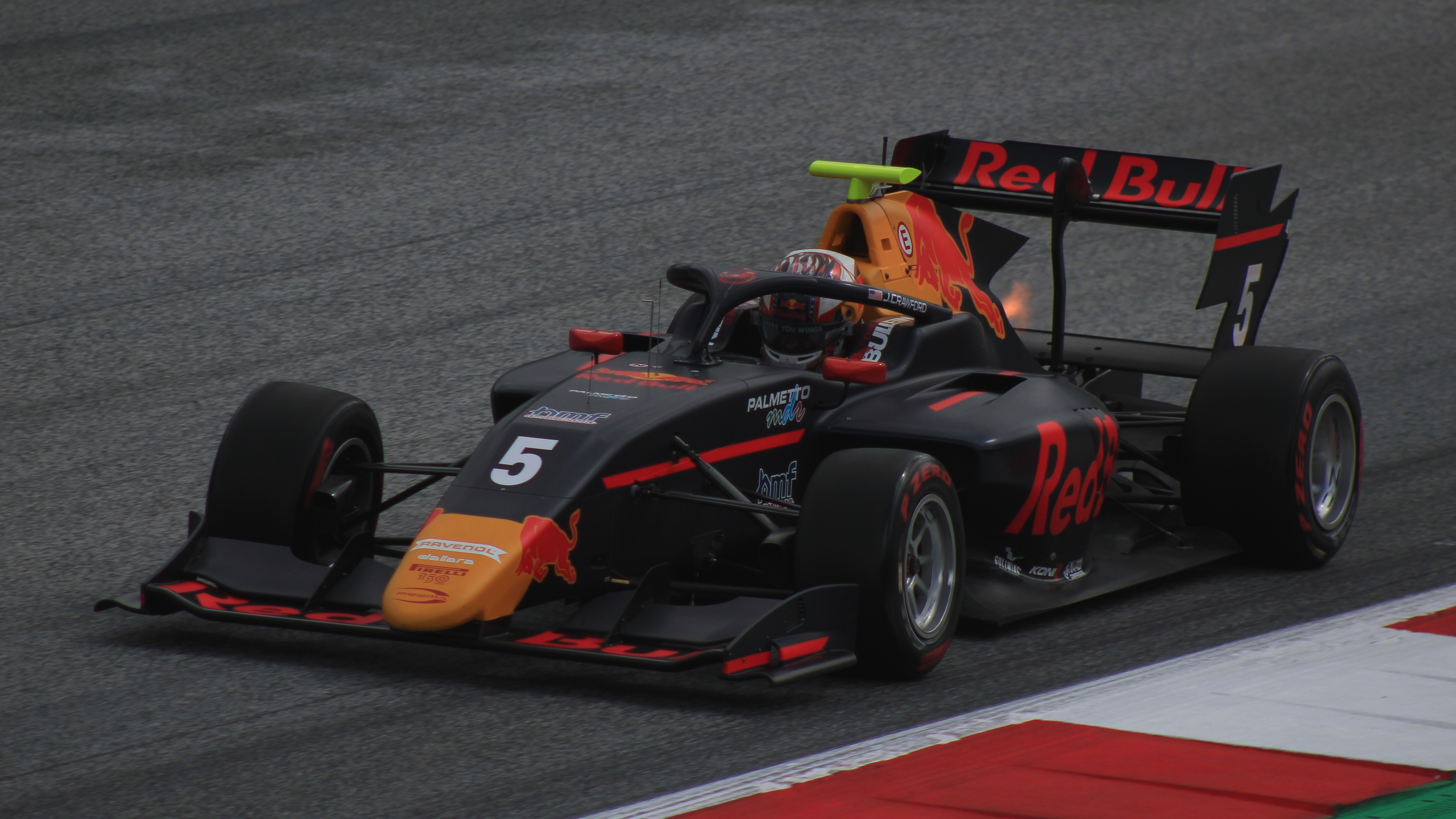
Crawford driving for Prema Racing during the 2022 Spielberg Formula 3 round

In November, Crawford joined Prema Racing, which had taken fellow Red Bull junior Dennis Hauger to that year's title, for the post-season test. In January 2022, Crawford was confirmed with the Italian outfit for that year's championship. An engine issue confined Crawford to 20th in qualifying for the opening Bahrain round. After his sprint race was compromised by front wing damage, Crawford went on a charge on Sunday, making up thirteen places in the feature race to finish in seventh. Crawford qualified a personal best third in Imola, and took his first podium of the season the next day, inheriting two positions from a collision between Isack Hadjar and Caio Collet ahead on the last lap. In the feature race, Crawford rounded the weekend with another podium in second place, having passed teammate Oliver Bearman on the penultimate lap for the position. He repeated this feat in the Barcelona sprint race with another second place as he was unable to get through David Vidales for the victory. He finished sixth in the feature race, a result that moved him into title battle.

After scoring more points in Silverstone, Crawford earned his big break in the Austrian sprint race, overtaking Caio Collet on lap 14 for the lead to secure his first F3 victory. His fortunes were reverse the next day however, as he was hit and tagged into a spin from Jonny Edgar behind during the closing laps. His poor luck continued in the Budapest sprint race, as his was tipped into a spin on the last lap by teammate Arthur Leclerc from fourth place, causing both to drop out of the points. He finished fifth in the feature race, losing a place to Zak O'Sullivan on the final lap. In qualifying for Spa-Francorchamps, Crawford spun out which confined him to last. Despite making up 32 positions in both races, he was forced to cope with his first non-scoring weekend of the campaign. He qualified third in Zandvoort, and finished ninth in the sprint race, after a near-miss on the opening lap. In the feature race, a lock-up from Crawford after a safety car restart caused him to lose positions; he recovered to sixth but was left at an outside chance for the title. Qualifying eighth in Monza, Crawford ended his season positively amidst battles; finishing seventh in the sprint before taking a third place rostrum on Sunday due to penalties.

Crawford finished the year seventh in the standings with one win, five podiums and 109 points.

=== FIA Formula 2 Championship ===
==== 2023 ====
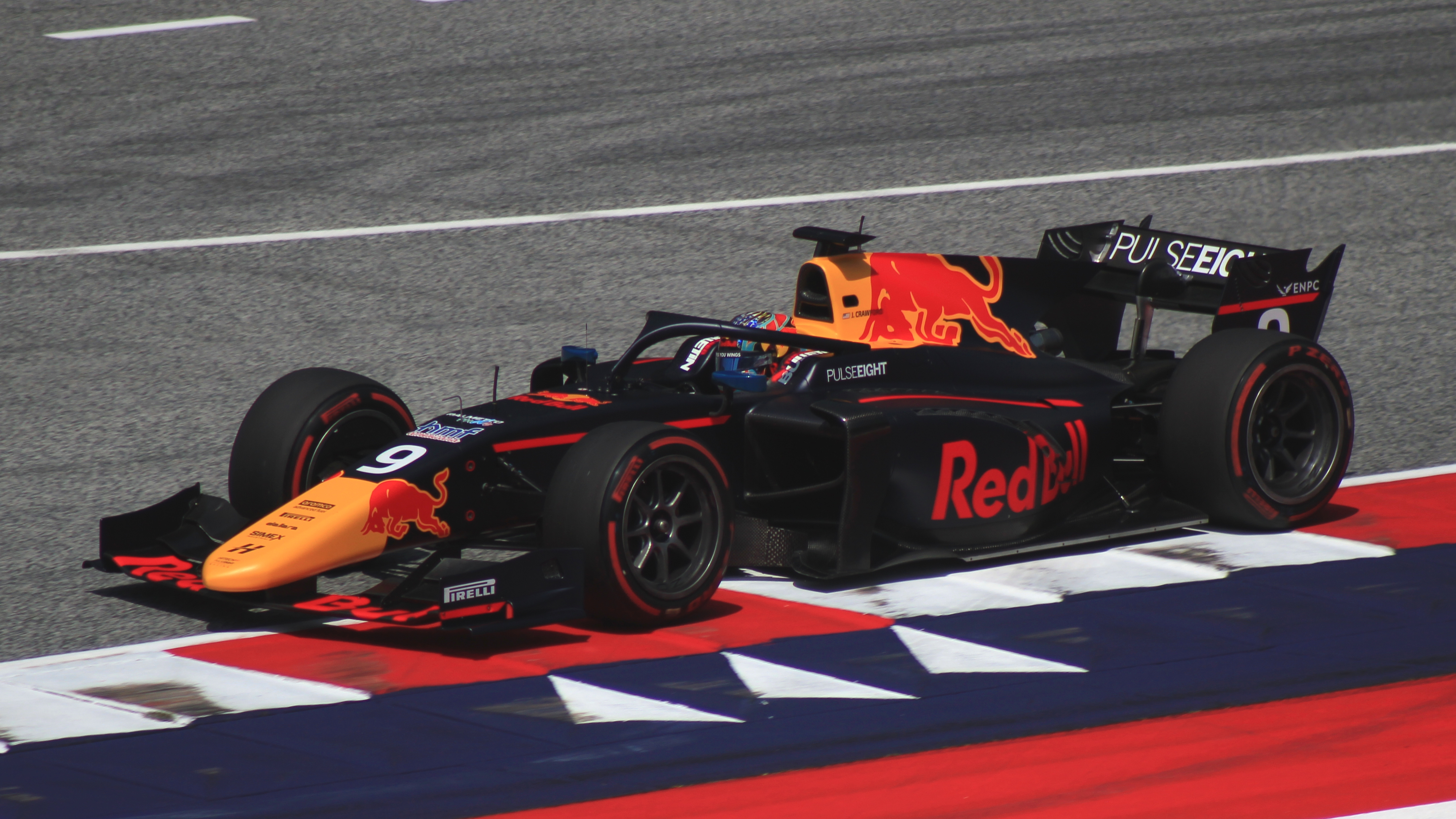
Crawford driving the Dallara F2 2018 during the 2023 Spielberg Formula 2 round

In January 2023, it was announced that Crawford would be reuniting with Hitech for the 2023 Formula 2 Championship, partnering Red Bull junior Isack Hadjar. Crawford endured a difficult opening phase to the season, failing to score points in the first two rounds. Despite starting on reverse pole in Jeddah, he lacked pace in the sprint race and fell out of the points on the final lap. His season began to turn around in Melbourne, where he took his first podium in the sprint race after having challenged eventual winner Dennis Hauger on the opening lap. His feature race however, ended on lap 6 following contact with Jack Doohan that forced him into the wall. He finished on the podium again during the Baku sprint race after multiple frontrunners ahead crashed out during a late safety car restart, and finished ninth in the feature race to secure his first double points finish weekend. Another third place followed in the Monaco sprint, benefitting from teammate and race leader Hadjar’s mechanical issue. As in Baku, he finished ninth in the feature race. A potential fourth consecutive sprint podium slipped away in the Barcelona sprint when first-lap contact with Frederik Vesti broke his suspension and caused his retirement.

In the Austria sprint race, Crawford started on reverse grid pole on slick tyres in changeable conditions; this proved to be the right gamble, as despite losing places on the opening lap, returned to the front on lap 6 which secured his first Formula 2 victory. Despite dropping several positions on the opening lap of the feature race, a late safety car played into Crawford's hands, pitting for new tyres which allowed him to move up and finish in eighth place. The following rounds proved more challenging, yielding only a single point, including a retirement in the Spa-Francorchamps feature race when he was taken out by Juan Manuel Correa while in the hunt for points.

After the summer break, Crawford took his maiden pole position at Zandvoort. He was eliminated in a heavy opening-lap collision with both Campos cars in the wet sprint, but escaped uninjured. On Sunday, Crawford led the opening few laps but was jumped in the pit stops by Clément Novalak due to a safety car. He then lost another place to Zane Maloney during the safety car restart, nevertheless he secured his first feature race podium with third place. He had a disappointing weekend in Monza despite qualifying seventh; a penalty for track limits dropped him out of the points-paying positions in the sprint, while he broke his front wing after contact with Kush Maini on lap 23, and was given a grid penalty for the incident. He ended his rookie campaign with a strong recovery drive in the Yas Marina feature race, gaining nine positions from 19th on an alternative strategy to finish tenth.

Crawford finished the season thirteenth in the drivers' championship with one win, one pole, five podiums and 57 points; he also finished two points ahead of teammate Hadjar.

==== 2024 ====
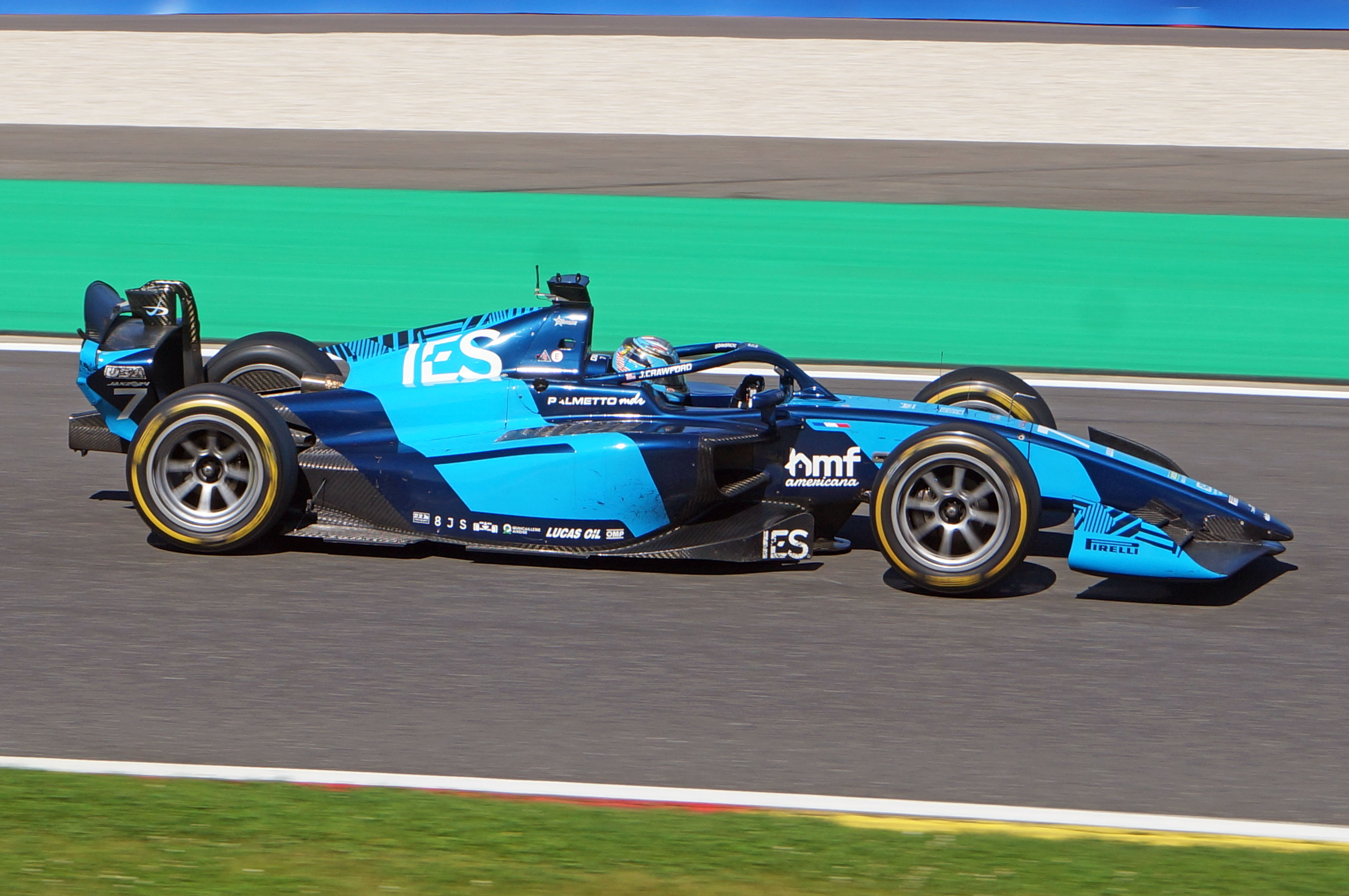
Crawford driving for DAMS Lucas Oil during the 2024 Spa-Francorchamps Formula 2 round

For the 2024 season, Crawford made the transition to DAMS Lucas Oil, partnering Juan Manuel Correa. Ahead of the season, Crawford had targeted to be in the "top three in the championship". His year began strongly in Bahrain; starting from reverse-grid pole in the sprint, he led the opening laps before being passed by Zane Maloney, ultimately securing second place. He was fighting at the front in the feature race, but he retired mid-race after stalling in the pits. Qualifying third in Jeddah, Crawford made up positions in the sprint by finishing fifth despite being hit by Andrea Kimi Antonelli behind at the start. In the feature race, he narrowly missed the podium, finishing fourth after being edged out by Dennis Hauger by less than a tenth of a second. Melbourne proved more challenging; technical issues in qualifying left him on the back row, and he salvaged only a single point in the feature race. Mechanical issues again hindered Crawford in qualifying for Imola as he lined up 21st, but charged through the field in the feature race, bringing home points in seventh place. Crawford was forced to cope with his first non-scoring round of the campaign in Monaco, qualifying down in 18th before being taken out on the opening lap of the feature race by Kush Maini.

He banished previous qualifying woes with a front row start in Barcelona. After managing his tyres well in the sprint and gaining positions from penalties, Crawford placed fourth in the sprint. The seas parted for Crawford on Sunday, as he jumped polesitter Paul Aron in the pit stops and controlled the remainder of the race to claim his maiden feature race victory. A steady run of points continued into the next two rounds. From 14th on the sprint in Austria, he climbed to sixth, though a stall on the formation lap forced a pit lane start in the feature race; he recovered to tenth. In Silverstone, he claimed sixth in the sprint and initially fought for victory on Sunday before a time penalty for an unsafe release dropped him to third. Hungary proved more difficult as he qualified last and failed to score, but he returned to the podium in Spa-Francorchamps feature race, inheriting third place on the final lap following Paul Aron's late engine failure. He added further points in Monza despite starting outside the top-ten. Starting on the reverse front row during the Baku sprint race, he had a slow start and lost two places, but recovered those positions to finish in second place. He added eighth in the feature race.

In Qatar, he secured a second consecutive sprint podium, finishing third after spending much of the race behind Victor Martins and benefitting from Hadjar’s spin. His feature race ended prematurely after a collision with Rafael Villagómez following a safety car restart. Yas Marina concluded the season on a sour note; Crawford scored just one point across the weekend and retired from the feature race after further contact with Villagómez. Crawford finished fifth in the championship with 125 points, taking one win and six podiums.

==== 2025 ====
Crawford would remain with DAMS Lucas Oil for the 2025 FIA Formula 2 season. He took pole position for round three in Jeddah, but lost the lead of the feature race to Richard Verschoor in the final lap. Nevertheless, he bounced back in the next round at Imola to take his first win of the season in the sprint race, having passed Ritomo Miyata for the lead on lap one. He won again in Monaco, this time in the feature race; he avoided the large multi-car incident at the start of the race, and took advantage of a well-timed pitstop under safety car to take the lead of the race.

=== Formula One ===
In January 2020, Crawford was named as a new signing for the Red Bull Junior Team. He departed the junior squad after four years. Despite that, his involvement in Formula One remained as he signed with the Aston Martin Driver Development Programme for 2024.

On 5 June 2024, Crawford made his debut in a Formula One car for the first time, driving the Aston Martin AMR22 at the Red Bull Ring. He tested the AMR22 again a month later, at the Red Bull Ring. Crawford also drove the AMR24 during the Young Driver Test at the Yas Marina Circuit following the Abu Dhabi Grand Prix, where he completed 109 laps.

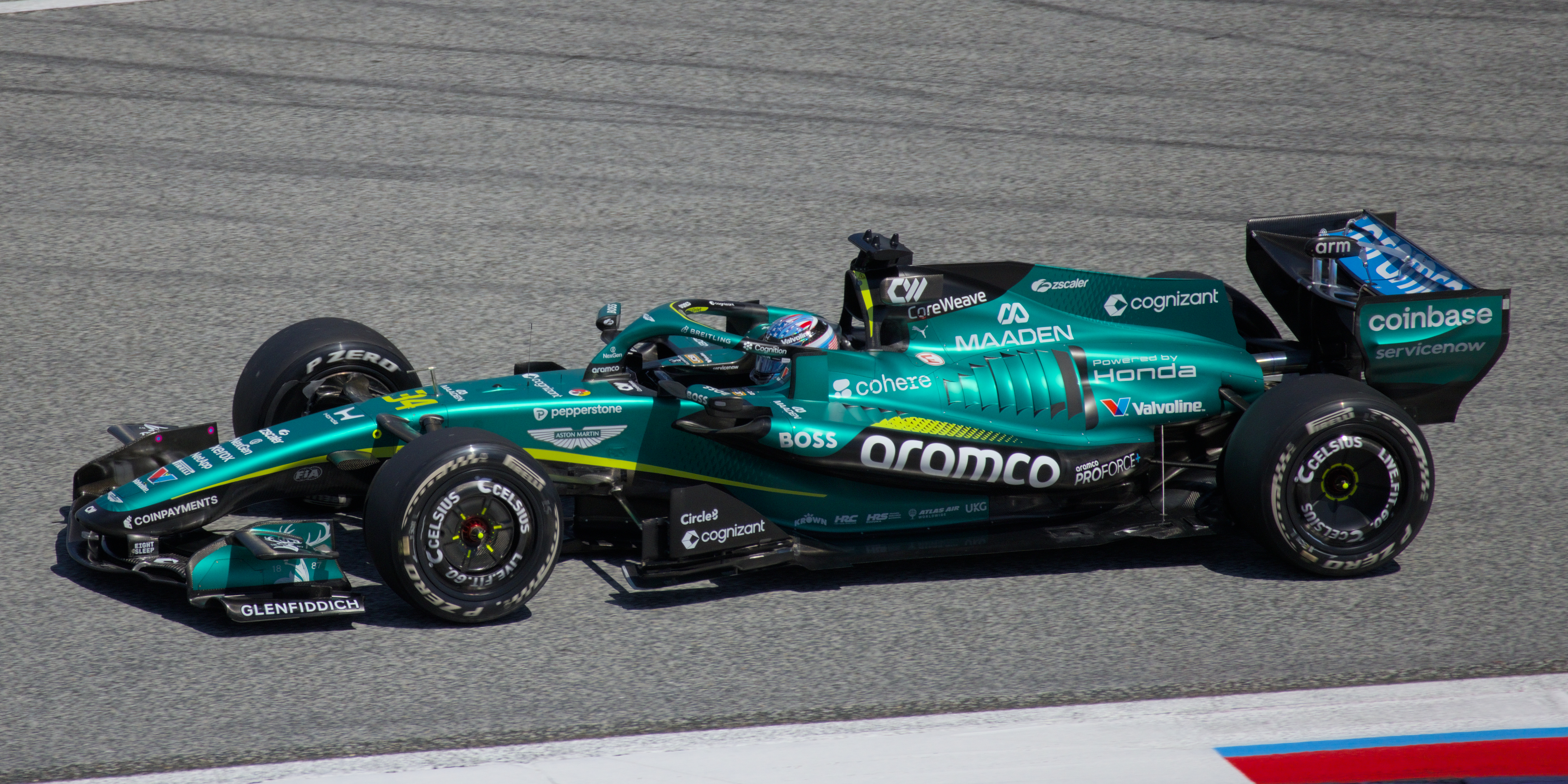
Crawford testing the Aston Martin AMR26 during the FP1 of the 2026 Austrian Grand Prix

In May 2025, Crawford returned to the wheel of a Formula One car, driving the AMR23 in Zandvoort. Following the Belgian Grand Prix, Crawford confirmed he was in talks with Cadillac for a drive in the 2026 season, but Valtteri Bottas and Sergio Pérez were given the seats. At the Mexico City Grand Prix, Crawford made his free practice debut with Aston Martin, taking Lance Stroll's seat. He once again drove the AMR25 during the season-ending Abu Dhabi Grand Prix as well as the Yas Marina young drivers' test, where he set the fastest time in the latter.

In October 2025, Crawford was confirmed as Aston Martin's third and reserve driver for the 2026 season. He made his first free practice appearance of the year at the Japanese Grand Prix. He made further free practice outings at the Austrian Grand Prix, Belgian Grand Prix, and Mexico City Grand Prix.

=== Other racing ===
==== Formula E ====
In May 2024, Andretti Formula E announced Crawford to be taking part in the Berlin rookie test for them. Later that year, Crawford was announced to be the reserve driver for Andretti for the 2024–25 season. He returned to the Formula E cockpit during the Jeddah ePrix for the rookie free practice session. He drove for Andretti again during the Berlin rookie test alongside Frederik Vesti, ending the session sixth in the timesheets.

== Karting record ==
=== Karting career summary ===
Season	Series	Team	Position
2013	SKUSA SuperNationals — TaG Cadet	3G Kart Racing	NC
2014	Florida Winter Tour — TaG Cadet	3G Kart Racing	29th
2014	Florida Winter Tour — Rotax Micro Max	CMW	6th
2014	SKUSA Pro Tour — TaG Cadet		10th
2015	Florida Winter Tour — Rotax Micro Max		4th
2015	Florida Winter Tour — Mini ROK		6th
2015	SKUSA SuperNationals — TaG Cadet	Nash Motorsportz	**3rd**
2015	SKUSA Pro Tour — TaG Cadet		**3rd**
2015	Challenge of the Americas — Mini Max		**3rd**
2015	Rotax Max Challenge Grand Finals — Mini Max		27th
2016	Florida Winter Tour — Rotax Mini Max		14th
2016	Florida Winter Tour — Mini ROK		**1st**
2016	Challenge of the Americas — Mini Max		14th
2016	ROK Cup International Final — Mini ROK	Energy Corse	5th
2016	Canadian National Karting Championships — Rotax Mini Max		**2nd**
2017	Challenge of the Americas — Junior Rotax		**1st**
2017	SKUSA SuperNationals — X30 Junior	Nash Motorsportz	**1st**
2017	Rotax Max Challenge Grand Finals — Junior	SRA Karting	6th
2018	ROK the Rio — Junior ROK		6th
2018	CIK-FIA Karting Academy Trophy	Crawford, Timothy	10th
2018	WSK Super Master Series — OKJ	Energy Corse	30th
2018	CIK-FIA European Championship — OKJ	Kosmic Racing Department	17th
2018	German Karting Championship — Junior	Kosmic Racing Department	9th
2018	SKUSA SuperNationals — X30 Junior	Nash Motorsportz	**3rd**
2019	SKUSA SuperNationals — X30 Senior	Nash Motorsportz	**3rd**

=== Complete CIK-FIA Karting European Championship results ===
(key) (Races in bold indicate pole position) (Races in italics indicate fastest lap)

Year	Team	Class	1	2	3	4	5	6	7	8	DC	Points
2018	Kosmic Racing Department	OKJ	SAR; QH; 8	SAR; R 7	PFI; QH; 26	PFI; R 22	AMP; QH; 34	AMP; R 31	LEM; QH; 35	LEM; R DNQ	17th	12

== Racing record ==
=== Racing career summary ===
Season	Series	Team	Races	Wins	Poles	F/Laps	Podiums	Points	Position
2018–19	NACAM Formula 4 Championship	Scuderia Martiga EG	20	6	3	12	14	322	**2nd**
2019	U.S. F2000 National Championship	DEForce Racing	7	0	0	0	0	183	7th
2019	U.S. F2000 National Championship	Cape Motorsports	6	0	0	0	0	183	7th
2020	ADAC Formula 4 Championship	Van Amersfoort Racing	21	5	4	5	12	298	**2nd**
2020	Italian F4 Championship	Van Amersfoort Racing	14	2	1	0	7	150	6th
2021	FIA Formula 3 Championship	Hitech Grand Prix	20	0	0	0	1	45	13th
2021	Euroformula Open Championship	Team Motopark	16	8	4	12	10	304	**3rd**
2021	SCCA Super Tour - FA	N/A	2	0	1	0	0	7	42nd
2022	Formula Regional Asian Championship	Abu Dhabi Racing by Prema	15	0	0	1	3	113	6th
2022	FIA Formula 3 Championship	Prema Racing	18	1	0	2	5	109	7th
2023	Formula Regional Middle East Championship	Hitech Grand Prix	3	0	0	0	0	4	28th
2023	FIA Formula 2 Championship	Hitech Pulse-Eight	26	1	1	0	5	57	13th
2024	FIA Formula 2 Championship	DAMS Lucas Oil	28	1	0	1	6	125	5th
2024–25	Formula E	Andretti Formula E	Reserve driver						
2025	FIA Formula 2 Championship	DAMS Lucas Oil	26	4	2	1	8	175	**2nd**
2025	Formula One	Aston Martin Aramco F1 Team	Test driver						
2026	Formula One	Aston Martin Aramco F1 Team	Reserve driver						

* Season still in progress.

=== Complete NACAM Formula 4 Championship results ===
(key) (Races in bold indicate pole position) (Races in italics indicate fastest lap)

Year	Team	1	2	3	4	5	6	7	8	9	10	11	12	13	14	15	16	17	18	19	20	Pos	Points
2018–19	Scuderia Martiga EG	AHR1; 1; 5	AHR1; 2; 3	PUE1; 1; 3	PUE1; 2; 1	PUE1; 3; 2	SLP; 1; 2	SLP; 2; 1	SLP; 3; 4	MTY; 1 Ret	MTY; 2; 2	MTY; 3; 6	AGS; 1; 2	AGS; 2; 4	AGS; 3 Ret	**PUE2**; **1**; 1	PUE2; 2; 3	**PUE2**; **3**; 1	**AHR2**; **1**; 1	AHR2; 2; 1	AHR2; 3; 2	2nd	322

=== Complete U.S. F2000 National Championship results ===
Year	Team	1	2	3	4	5	6	7	8	9	10	11	12	13	14	15	Rank	Points
2019	DEForce Racing	STP	STP	IMS; 18	IMS; 4	LOR; 4	ROA; 14	ROA; 6	TOR; 12	TOR; 5							7th	183
2019	Cape Motorsports										MOH; 7	MOH; 5	POR; 6	POR; 6	LAG; 5	LAG; 15	7th	183

=== Complete ADAC Formula 4 Championship results ===
(key) (Races in bold indicate pole position) (Races in italics indicate fastest lap)

Year	Team	1	2	3	4	5	6	7	8	9	10	11	12	13	14	15	16	17	18	19	20	21	Pos	Points
2020	Van Amersfoort Racing	**LAU1**; **1**; 4	**LAU1**; **2**; 2	LAU1; 3; 10	NÜR1; 1; 10	NÜR1; 2; 4	NÜR1; 3; 2	HOC; 1; 2	HOC; 2; 8	HOC; 3; 2	**NÜR2**; **1**; 1	NÜR2; 2; 4	NÜR2; 3; 3	RBR; 1; 3	RBR; 2; 2	RBR; 3; 1	LAU2; 1; 8	LAU2; 2; 1	LAU2; 3 Ret	OSC; 1; 1	**OSC**; **2**; 1	OSC; 3; 6	2nd	298

=== Complete Italian F4 Championship results ===
(key) (Races in bold indicate pole position) (Races in italics indicate fastest lap)

Year	Team	1	2	3	4	5	6	7	8	9	10	11	12	13	14	15	16	17	18	19	20	21	Pos	Points
2020	Van Amersfoort Racing	MIS; 1	MIS; 2	MIS; 3	IMO1; 1; 3	IMO1; 2; 2	**IMO1**; **3** Ret	RBR; 1; 4	RBR; 2; 1	RBR; 3; 3	MUG; 1; 24	MUG; 2; 11	MUG; 3; 18	MNZ; 1	MNZ; 2	MNZ; 3	IMO2; 1; 3	IMO2; 2; 3	IMO2; 3; 1	VLL; 1 Ret	VLL; 2 C	VLL; 3; 5	6th	150

=== Complete Euroformula Open Championship results ===
(key) (Races in bold indicate pole position; races in italics indicate points for the fastest lap of top ten finishers)

Year	Entrant	1	2	3	4	5	6	7	8	9	10	11	12	13	14	15	16	17	18	19	20	21	22	23	24	DC	Points
2021	Team Motopark	POR; 1 DNP	POR; 2 DNP	POR; 3; 7	**LEC**; **1**; 1	LEC; 2; 1	LEC; 3; 2	SPA; 1	SPA; 2	SPA; 3	**HUN**; **1**; 12	HUN; 2; 6	HUN; 3; 4	**IMO**; **1**; 1	IMO; 2; 2	IMO; 3; 1	**RBR**; **1**; 1	RBR; 2; 5	RBR; 3; 1	MNZ; 1	MNZ; 2	MNZ; 3	CAT; 1; 6	CAT; 2; 1	CAT; 3; 1	3rd	304

=== Complete FIA Formula 3 Championship results ===
(key) (Races in bold indicate pole position; races in italics indicate fastest lap)

Year	Entrant	1	2	3	4	5	6	7	8	9	10	11	12	13	14	15	16	17	18	19	20	21	DC	Points
2021	Hitech Grand Prix	CAT; 1; 13	CAT; 2; 9	CAT; 3; 18	LEC; 1; 11	LEC; 2; 14	LEC; 3; 10	RBR; 1; 8	RBR; 2 Ret	RBR; 3; 26	HUN; 1; 26	HUN; 2; 20	HUN; 3; 15	SPA; 1; 2	SPA; 2; 12	SPA; 3; 12	ZAN; 1; 4	ZAN; 2; 8	ZAN; 3; 7	SOC; 1; 11	SOC; 2 C	SOC; 3; 5	13th	45
2022	Prema Racing	BHR; SPR; 27	BHR; FEA; 7	IMO; SPR; 3	IMO; FEA; 2	CAT; SPR; 2	CAT; FEA; 6	SIL; SPR; 10	SIL; FEA; 6	RBR; SPR; 1	RBR; FEA; 22	HUN; SPR; 20	HUN; FEA; 5	SPA; SPR; 11	SPA; FEA; 17	ZAN; SPR; 9	ZAN; FEA; 6	MNZ; SPR; 7	MNZ; FEA; 3				7th	109

=== Complete Formula Regional Asian Championship results ===
(key) (Races in bold indicate pole position) (Races in italics indicate the fastest lap of top ten finishers)

Year	Entrant	1	2	3	4	5	6	7	8	9	10	11	12	13	14	15	DC	Points
2022	Abu Dhabi Racing by Prema	ABU; 1; 11	ABU; 2; 7	ABU; 3; 2	DUB; 1; 4	DUB; 2; 9	DUB; 3; 6	DUB; 1; 12	DUB; 2; 7	DUB; 3; 12	DUB; 1; 6	DUB; 2; 2	DUB; 3; 6	ABU; 1; 3	ABU; 2 Ret	ABU; 3; 4	6th	113

=== Complete Formula Regional Middle East Championship results ===
(key) (Races in bold indicate pole position) (Races in italics indicate fastest lap)

Year	Entrant	1	2	3	4	5	6	7	8	9	10	11	12	13	14	15	DC	Points
2023	Hitech Grand Prix	DUB1; 1; 19	DUB1; 2; 16	DUB1; 3; 8	KUW1; 1	KUW1; 2	KUW1; 3	KUW2; 1	KUW2; 2	KUW2; 3	DUB2; 1	DUB2; 2	DUB2; 3	ABU; 1	ABU; 2	ABU; 3	28th	4

=== Complete FIA Formula 2 Championship results ===
(key) (Races in bold indicate pole position) (Races in italics indicate points for the fastest lap of top ten finishers)

Year	Entrant	1	2	3	4	5	6	7	8	9	10	11	12	13	14	15	16	17	18	19	20	21	22	23	24	25	26	27	28	DC	Points
2023	Hitech Pulse-Eight	BHR; SPR; 14	BHR; FEA; 12	JED; SPR; 9	JED; FEA; 15	MEL; SPR; 2	MEL; FEA; Ret	BAK; SPR; 3	BAK; FEA; 9	MCO; SPR; 3	MCO; FEA; 9	CAT; SPR; Ret	CAT; FEA; 13	RBR; SPR; 1	RBR; FEA; 8	SIL; SPR; 14	SIL; FEA; 10	HUN; SPR; 14	HUN; FEA; 17	SPA; SPR; 14	SPA; FEA; Ret	ZAN; SPR; Ret	**ZAN**; **FEA**; 3	MNZ; SPR; 13	MNZ; FEA; 16†	YMC; SPR; 12	YMC; FEA; 10			13th	57
2024	DAMS Lucas Oil	BHR; SPR; 2	BHR; FEA; Ret	JED; SPR; 5	JED; FEA; 4	MEL; SPR; 9	MEL; FEA; 10	IMO; SPR; 14	IMO; FEA; 7	MON; SPR; 13	MON; FEA; Ret	CAT; SPR; 4	CAT; FEA; 1	RBR; SPR; 6	RBR; FEA; 10	SIL; SPR; 6	SIL; FEA; 3	HUN; SPR; 9	HUN; FEA; 17	SPA; SPR; 5	SPA; FEA; 3	MNZ; SPR; 6	MNZ; FEA; 9	BAK; SPR; 2	BAK; FEA; 8	LSL; SPR; 2	LSL; FEA; Ret	YMC; SPR; 8	YMC; FEA; Ret	5th	125
2025	DAMS Lucas Oil	MEL; SPR; Ret	MEL; FEA; C	BHR; SPR; 12	BHR; FEA; 16	JED; SPR; Ret	**JED**; **FEA**; 2	IMO; SPR; 1	IMO; FEA; 6	MON; SPR; 4	MON; FEA; 1	CAT; SPR; 4	CAT; FEA; 4	RBR; SPR; DNS	RBR; FEA; 3	SIL; SPR; 6	SIL; FEA; 1	SPA; SPR; 10	SPA; FEA; 17	HUN; SPR; 3	HUN; FEA; 3	MNZ; SPR; 16	MNZ; FEA; 11	BAK; SPR; 4	**BAK**; **FEA**; 1	LSL; SPR; 8	LSL; FEA; 11	YMC; SPR; 6	YMC; FEA; 10	2nd	175

=== Complete Formula One participations ===
(key) (Races in bold indicate pole position) (Races in italics indicate fastest lap)

Year	Entrant	Chassis	Engine	1	2	3	4	5	6	7	8	9	10	11	12	13	14	15	16	17	18	19	20	21	22	23	24	WDC	Points
2025	Aston Martin Aramco F1 Team	Aston Martin AMR25	Mercedes AMG F1 M16 E Performance V6 t	AUS	CHN	JPN	BHR	SAU	MIA	EMI	MON	ESP	CAN	AUT	GBR	BEL	HUN	NED	ITA	AZE	SIN	USA	MXC; TD	SAP	LVG	QAT	ABU; TD	–	–
2026	Aston Martin Aramco F1 Team	Aston Martin AMR26	Honda RA626H V6 t	AUS	CHN	JPN; TD	MIA	CAN	MON	BCN	AUT; TD	GBR	BEL; TD	HUN	NED	ITA	ESP	AZE	BHR	SIN	USA	MXC; TD	SAP	LVG; TD	QAT	ABU		–	–
