= Aston Martin AMR23 =

2023 Formula One car

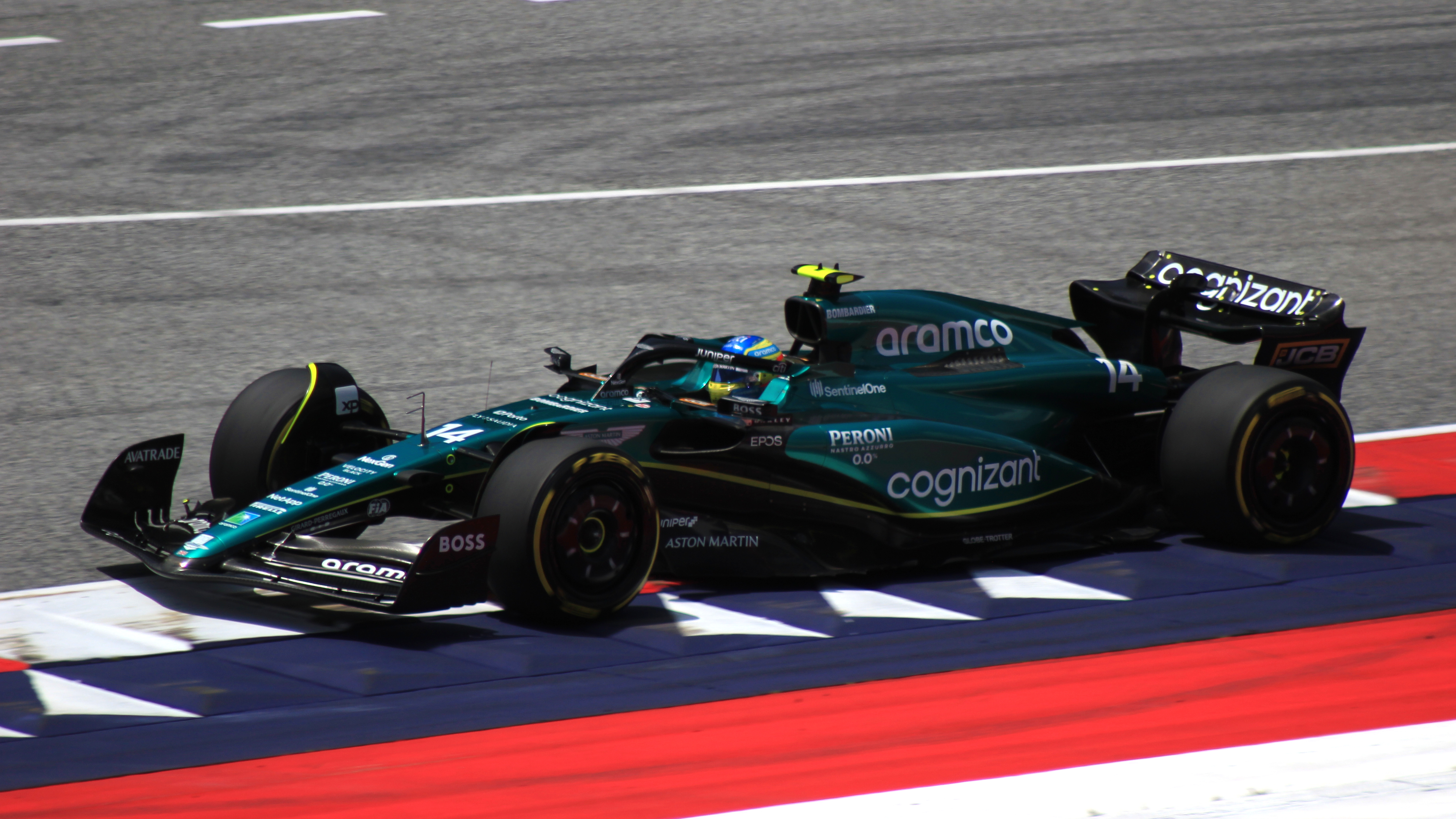
- Fernando Alonso driving an AMR23 during the Austrian Grand Prix
- Category: Formula One
- Designers: Andrew Green (Chief Technical Officer); Dan Fallows (Technical Director); Eric Blandin (Deputy Technical Director); Luca Furbatto (Engineering Director); Tom McCullough (Performance Director); Akio Haga (Chief Designer); Ian Hall (Chief Designer - Future Car); Bruce Eddington (Deputy Chief Designer, Composites); Daniel Carpenter (Deputy Chief Designer, Mechanical); Craig Gardiner (Head of Vehicle Performance); William Worrall (Chief Engineer - Performance Optimisation and Analytics); Ian Greig (Head of Aerodynamic Development); Guru Johl (Chief Aerodynamicist); Mark Robinson (Deputy Chief Aerodynamicist); Mark Gardiner (Deputy Chief Aerodynamicist)
- Predecessor: Aston Martin AMR22
- Successor: Aston Martin AMR24

Technical specifications
- Chassis: AMR23
- Fuel: Aramco
- Lubricants: Aramco
- Tyres: Pirelli P Zero (Dry/Slick); Pirelli Cinturato (Wet/Treaded)

Competition history
- Notable entrants: Aston Martin Aramco Cognizant F1 Team
- Notable drivers: 14. (Spain) Fernando Alonso; 18. (Canada) Lance Stroll
- Debut: 2023 Bahrain Grand Prix
- Last event: 2023 Abu Dhabi Grand Prix
Races	Wins	Podiums	Poles	F/Laps
22	0	8	0	1

The Aston Martin AMR23 is a Formula One racing car designed and developed by the Aston Martin F1 team that competed in the 2023 Formula One World Championship. It is the third Formula One car entered by Aston Martin in the 21st century, and was driven by Lance Stroll and Fernando Alonso. Aston Martin reserve driver Felipe Drugovich temporarily replaced Stroll for all three days of the pre-season test in Bahrain, after the latter had a cycling incident that forced him to withdraw from the test. An immediate improvement on the AMR22, the AMR23 scored six podiums throughout the first half of the season, all through new Aston Martin signing Alonso. However, its performance began to deteriorate as the season went on, and Aston Martin would score no further podiums, bar two at the Dutch and São Paulo Grands Prix; its highest Grand Prix finish was three second places at the Monaco, Canadian and Dutch Grands Prix.

The AMR23 is among the first Mercedes-AMG powered F1 car to utilize non Petronas-branded fuel and lubricants since 2016 along with the Williams FW45.

== Design and development ==
An interactive 3D model (click on it to interact)

On 16 December 2022, Aston Martin announced that they would launch the AMR23 on 13 February 2023 making them the first constructor to announce their launch date.

== Competition history ==
The AMR23 immediately proved to be far more competitive than its predecessor, as the Aston Martin team were able to pick up 23 points from the opening round in Bahrain, with Fernando Alonso scoring the team's second ever podium finish in third place, and Lance Stroll finishing in sixth place, despite the two teammates colliding at turn four on the first lap. In the closing stages of the race, Alonso was running in sixth position, but he managed to overtake Lewis Hamilton and Carlos Sainz Jr. on-track, and combined with Charles Leclerc's retirement on lap 41, this allowed Alonso to secure third place. The following race at the 2023 Saudi Arabian Grand Prix marked Aston Martin's first retirement with Lance Stroll retiring on lap 16 due to engine issues; however, Alonso, having served a penalty earlier on for lining up on the wrong grid position after the formation lap, remained competitive, placing third once again behind the Red Bulls of Max Verstappen and Sergio Pérez and taking his 100th podium in his Formula One career - being the sixth driver in the sport's history to do so.

As the season continued, however, as cars introduced more upgrades, the team's performance had stagnated. While Alonso had scored a podium against tricky conditions at the Dutch Grand Prix, he found himself finishing outside of the podium, finishing the Singapore Grand Prix in a season-low fifteenth; he had run over debris after a lap-one incident and found the car "undrivable" as a result. Meanwhile, his teammate Stroll found himself being knocked out of Q1 more frequently during the latter half of the season, and in Singapore, withdrew due to a serious crash in qualifying. After the Japanese Grand Prix, the team had dropped to fourth in the Constructors' Championship behind Mercedes and Ferrari, and Alonso dropped down to fourth with Lewis Hamilton taking his position in the Drivers' Championship after Singapore. Despite a performance drop late-season, Alonso was able to claim a closely-contested third in Brazil, winning out against Pérez with his last lap overtake earning him the FIA Action Of The Year Award. By the end of the season the team finished fifth in the constructors' championship, 22 points behind McLaren. Alonso finished fourth place in the drivers' championship with 206 points and 8 podiums. This marked his highest championship finish since 2013. Stroll finished tenth in the drivers' championship with 74 points, his best ever season finish.

== Sponsorship and livery ==
The livery was largely identical to the previous year's design with subtle changes to the green tone. For the Saudi Arabian Grand Prix, the Peroni logo was replaced with "ITALIA 0.0" due to regulations regarding alcohol sponsorship in the country.

== Complete Formula One results ==
Key

Key
Colour	Result
Gold	Winner
Silver	Second place
Bronze	Third place
Green	Other points position
Blue	Other classified position
Blue	Not classified, finished (NC)
Purple	Not classified, retired (Ret)
Red	Did not qualify (DNQ)
Black	Disqualified (DSQ)
White	Did not start (DNS)
White	Race cancelled (C)
Blank	Did not practice (DNP)
Blank	Excluded (EX)
Blank	Did not arrive (DNA)
Blank	Withdrawn (WD)
Blank	Did not enter (empty cell)
Annotation	Meaning
P	Pole position
F	Fastest lap
Superscript number	Points-scoring position in sprint

Year	Entrant	Power unit	Tyres	Driver name	Grands Prix																						Points	WCC pos.
Year	Entrant	Power unit	Tyres	Driver name	BHR	SAU	AUS	AZE	MIA	MON	ESP	CAN	AUT	GBR	HUN	BEL	NED	ITA	SIN	JPN	QAT	USA	MXC	SAP	LVG	ABU	Points	WCC pos.
2023	Aston Martin Aramco Cognizant F1 Team	Mercedes-AMG F1 M14	P	Fernando Alonso	3	3	3	4^{6}	3	2	7	2	5^{5}	7	9	5	2^{F}	9	15	8	6^{8}	Ret	Ret	3	9	7	280	5th
2023	Aston Martin Aramco Cognizant F1 Team	Mercedes-AMG F1 M14	P	Lance Stroll	6	Ret	4	7^{8}	12	Ret	6	9	9^{4}	14	10	9	11	16	WD	Ret	11	7	17†	5	5	10	280	5th
