= Aston Martin AMR22 =

2022 Formula One racing car by Aston Martin

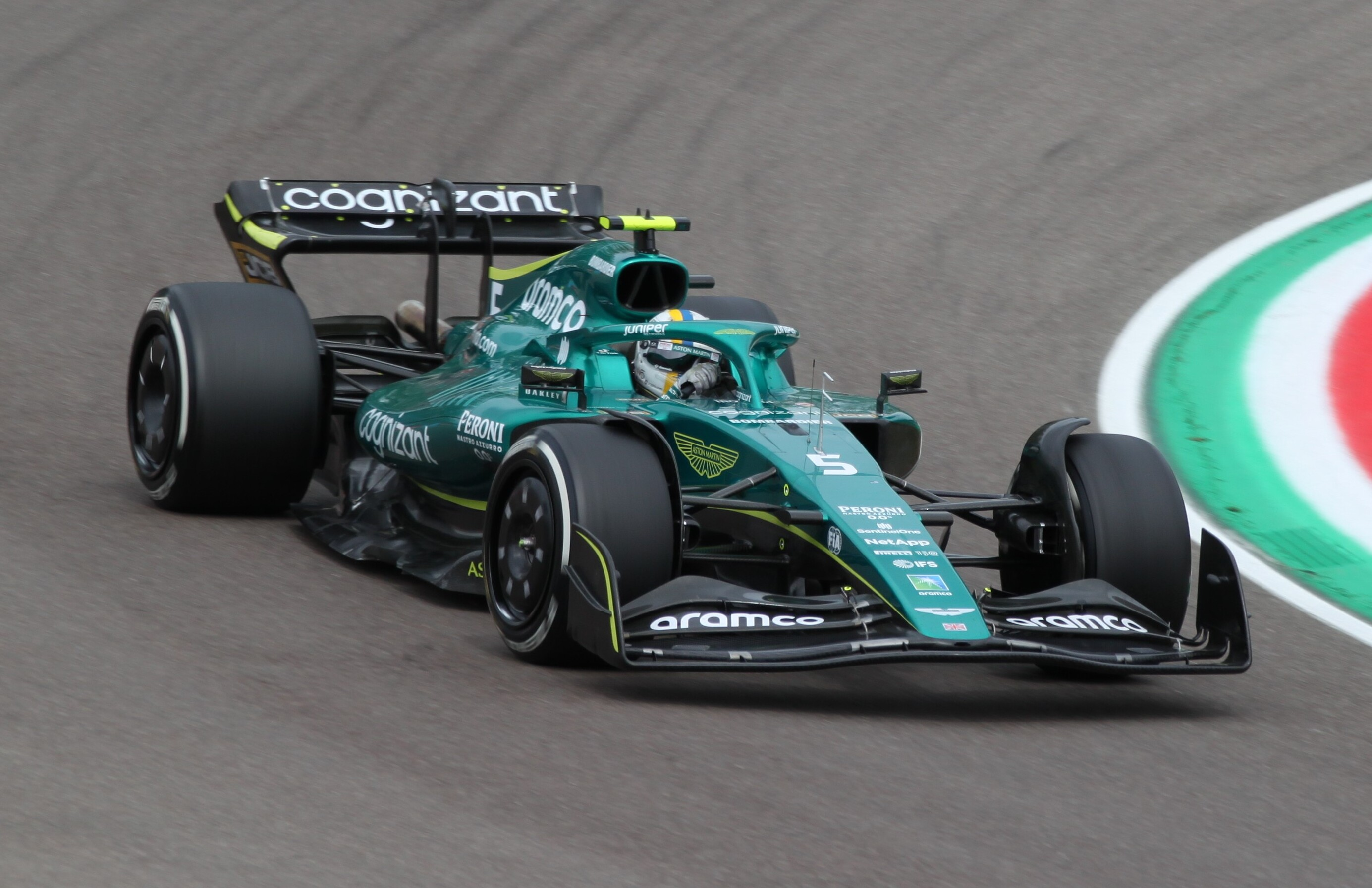
- Sebastian Vettel drives the AMR22 during the Emilia Romagna Grand Prix
- Category: Formula One
- Constructor: Aston Martin
- Designers: Andrew Green (Chief Technical Officer); Tom McCullough (Performance Director); Luca Furbatto (Engineering Director); Akio Haga (Chief Designer); Ian Hall (Chief Designer - Future Car); Bruce Eddington (Deputy Chief Designer, Composites); Daniel Carpenter (Deputy Chief Designer, Mechanical); Andrew Brown (Head of R&D); Craig Gardiner (Head of Vehicle Performance); Jonathan Marshall (Head of Vehicle Science); Robin Gearing (Chief Performance Engineer); William Worrall (Chief Engineer - Performance Optimisation and Analytics); Ian Grieg (Head of Aerodynamic Development); Guru Johl (Chief Aerodynamicist); Mark Gardiner (Deputy Chief Aerodynamicist)
- Predecessor: Aston Martin AMR21
- Successor: Aston Martin AMR23

Technical specifications
- Suspension (front): Carbon fibre wishbone and pushrod suspension elements operating inboard torsion bar and damper system
- Suspension (rear): Carbon fibre wishbone and pullrod suspension elements operating inboard torsion bar and damper system
- Engine: Mercedes-AMG F1 M13 E Performance 1.6 L (98 cu in) V6 (90°) turbocharged, 15,000 RPM limited Mid mounted
- Electric motor: Mercedes-AMG Kinetic and thermal energy recovery systems
- Transmission: 8-speed + 1 reverse
- Fuel: Petronas E10 (Note: Despite with Aramco branding, the car uses Petronas fuel before supplied by Aramco from 2023)
- Tyres: Pirelli P Zero (Dry/Slick); Pirelli Cinturato (Wet/Treaded)

Competition history
- Notable entrants: Aston Martin Aramco Cognizant F1 Team
- Notable drivers: 5. (Germany) Sebastian Vettel; 18. (Canada) Lance Stroll; 27. (Germany) Nico Hülkenberg
- Debut: 2022 Bahrain Grand Prix
- Last event: 2022 Abu Dhabi Grand Prix
Races	Wins	Podiums	Poles	F/Laps
22	0	0	0	0

The Aston Martin AMR22 is a Formula One racing car designed and developed by the Aston Martin F1 team to compete in the 2022 Formula One World Championship.

== Drivers ==
For 2022, Sebastian Vettel and Lance Stroll were both retained as race team drivers. Nico Hülkenberg was announced as reserve driver.

Ordinarily, Vettel names his Formula One cars. However, with the AMR22 this is not the case.

== Design and development ==
The AMR22 is the first car that has been overseen by new team principal, Mike Krack formerly of BMW Motorsport who replaced Otmar Szafnauer who joined Alpine. Dan Fallows joined the development team in April 2022, leaving Red Bull Racing to become Aston Martin's technical director. The AMR22 was first fired up on 4 February ahead of a launch on 10 February at the Aston Martin headquarters in Gaydon, United Kingdom. The following day, drivers Sebastian Vettel and Lance Stroll completed a shakedown at Silverstone Circuit.

Upon launch, it was noted that the AMR22 was a wide body, using the full width of the available floor. The sidepod radiators had a deep cut, and the AMR22 featured a double floor design. The engine was mounted towards the back, as noted by the plenum blister, which suggested the AMR22 had a small gearbox. The AMR22 had cooling vents along the entirety of the upper sidepod, the front openings of which were small boxes compared to previous cars. The AMR22 was part of the official pre season test in Bahrain, where 339 laps were completed at a fastest time of 1.33.821 (Vettel). At the second test in Barcelona both Vettel and Stroll performed the testing duties again, and managed a combined total of 296 laps.

At the Spanish Grand Prix, the AMR22 was significantly updated and changed. It was similar in design to the Red Bull, which was investigated by the FIA who confirmed the upgrades were legitimate. In a later interview, Andrew Green confirmed that the team had been working on two differing designs for the AMR22 over a six-month period. In June, driver Lance Stroll confirmed that there were further developments planned for the AMR22.

== Racing performance ==
Prior to the opening round of the season, Sebastian Vettel was replaced for the race by Nico Hülkenberg due his contraction of COVID-19. At the first race, neither car finished in the points scoring positions. At the second round in Saudi Arabia, both cars finished the race but again, neither scored points. Vettel returned for the Australian Grand Prix, but retired from the race.

Stroll at the French Grand Prix

The AMR22 scored its first points at the 2022 Emilia Romagna Grand Prix with an 8th and 10th-place finish. Stroll scored 10th place and a single point at the Miami Grand Prix and his home race in Canada, whilst Vettel secured three points finishes at Monaco, Azerbaijan and Britain. To celebrate Aston Martin's 100 years in motor racing, the AMR22 featured the marque's historic badge on its nosecone for the French Grand Prix. In the race, Stroll scored the team's first point since Silverstone, after a close last lap battle with teammate Vettel. The team secured its second double points score at the Singapore Grand Prix, with Stroll in 6th and Vettel in 8th. Vettel and Stroll's 6th-place finishes in Baku, Singapore and Japan are the AMR22's best results to date. Unfortunately, the team would finish in 7th place in the constructors' standings with Alfa Romeo finishing 6th on countback.

In late July, Vettel announced he would be retiring from Formula One at the end of the season. This means the AMR22 would be the final car driven competitively by the four time world champion.

== Sponsorship and livery ==
The AMR22 once again featured title sponsorship and branding from Cognizant. Aramco and Crypto.com both joined the team as senior partners with branding across the vehicle, and Aramco joining the team's official name. Prior to the BWT sponsorship being switched to Alpine, the pink stripe was replaced with a light lime stripe.

For the Saudi Arabian Grand Prix, the Peroni logo was replaced with "ITALIA 0.0" due to regulations regarding alcohol sponsorship in the country.

== Complete Formula One results ==
Key

Key
Colour	Result
Gold	Winner
Silver	Second place
Bronze	Third place
Green	Other points position
Blue	Other classified position
Blue	Not classified, finished (NC)
Purple	Not classified, retired (Ret)
Red	Did not qualify (DNQ)
Black	Disqualified (DSQ)
White	Did not start (DNS)
White	Race cancelled (C)
Blank	Did not practice (DNP)
Blank	Excluded (EX)
Blank	Did not arrive (DNA)
Blank	Withdrawn (WD)
Blank	Did not enter (empty cell)
Annotation	Meaning
P	Pole position
F	Fastest lap
Superscript number	Points-scoring position in sprint

Year	Entrant	Power unit	Tyres	Driver name	Grands Prix																						Points	WCC pos.
Year	Entrant	Power unit	Tyres	Driver name	BHR	SAU	AUS	EMI	MIA	ESP	MON	AZE	CAN	GBR	AUT	FRA	HUN	BEL	NED	ITA	SIN	JPN	USA	MXC	SAP	ABU	Points	WCC pos.
2022	Aston Martin Aramco Cognizant F1 Team	Mercedes-AMG F1 M13	P	(Canada) Lance Stroll	12	13	12	10	10	15	14	16†	10	11	13	10	11	11	10	Ret	6	12	Ret	15	10	8	55	7th
2022	Aston Martin Aramco Cognizant F1 Team	Mercedes-AMG F1 M13	P	(Germany) Sebastian Vettel			Ret	8	17†	11	10	6	12	9	17	11	10	8	14	Ret	8	6	8	14	11	10	55	7th
2022	Aston Martin Aramco Cognizant F1 Team	Mercedes-AMG F1 M13	P	(Germany) Nico Hülkenberg	17	12																					55	7th
