= Aston Martin AMR24 =

2024 Formula One car

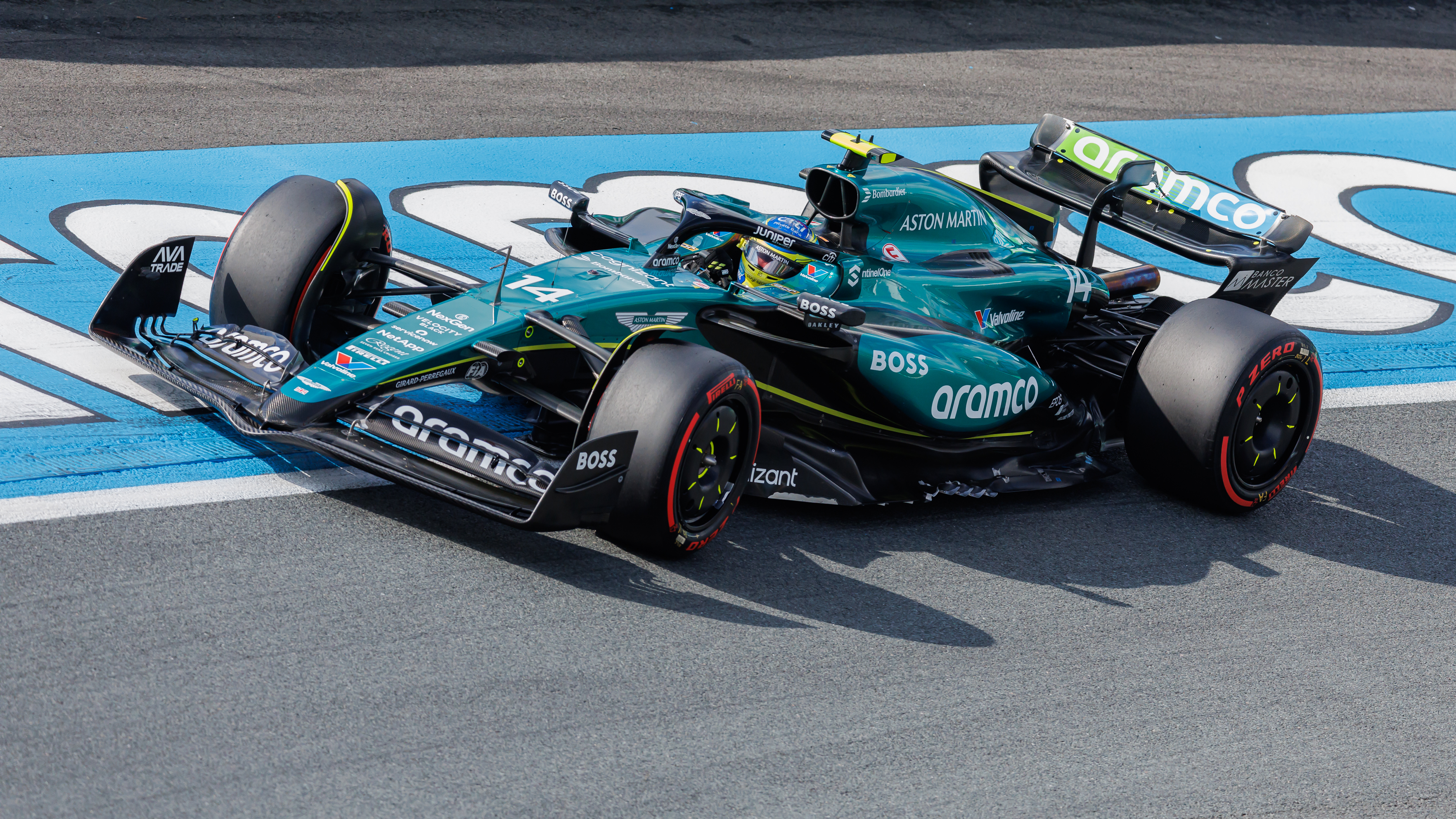
- Fernando Alonso driving an AMR24 during the Dutch Grand Prix
- Category: Formula One
- Designers: Dan Fallows (Technical Director); Eric Blandin (Deputy Technical Director); Luca Furbatto (Engineering Director); Tom McCullough (Performance Director); Tim Wright (Deputy Performance Director); Akio Haga (Chief Designer); Ian Hall (Chief Designer - Future Car); Bruce Eddington (Deputy Chief Designer, Composites); Daniel Carpenter (Deputy Chief Designer, Mechanical); William Worrall (Chief Engineer - Performance Optimisation & Analytics; Craig Gardiner (Deputy Chief Engineer, Vehicle Performance); Ian Greig (Head of Aerodynamics); Mark Robinson (Chief Aerodynamicist); Michael Hart (Deputy Chief Aerodynamicist)
- Predecessor: Aston Martin AMR23
- Successor: Aston Martin AMR25

Technical specifications
- Fuel: Aramco
- Lubricants: Valvoline
- Tyres: Pirelli P Zero (Dry/Slick); Pirelli Cinturato (Wet/Treaded)

Competition history
- Notable entrants: Aston Martin Aramco F1 Team
- Notable drivers: 14. (Spain) Fernando Alonso; 18. (Canada) Lance Stroll
- Debut: 2024 Bahrain Grand Prix
- Last event: 2024 Abu Dhabi Grand Prix
Races	Wins	Podiums	Poles
24	0	0	0

The Aston Martin AMR24 is a Formula One racing car designed and developed by the Aston Martin Aramco F1 Team which competed in the 2024 Formula One World Championship. It was the fourth Formula One car entered by Aston Martin since rejoining the sport in 2021, and was driven by two-time world champion Fernando Alonso and Lance Stroll with reserve driver duties handled by Felipe Drugovich and Stoffel Vandoorne, the former making the team's two mandatory rookie free practice stand-ins in the Mexico City and Abu Dhabi Grands Prix. Compared to its predecessor, the AMR23 which clinched 8 podiums across the 2023 season, the AMR24 sported worse performance and did not score a podium during the entire season, despite the team retaining their 5th place in the Constructors' Championship from the previous season.

== History ==
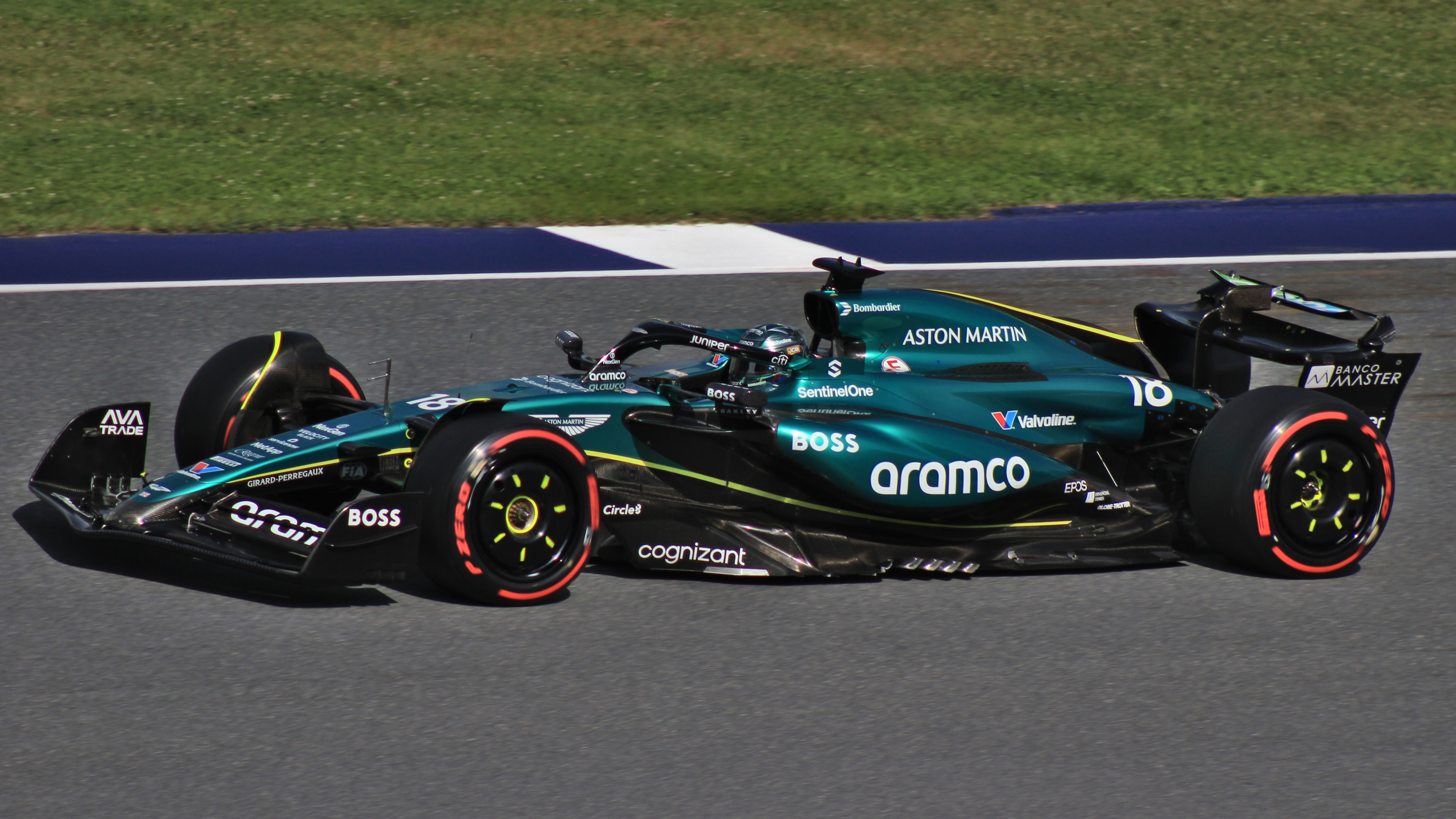
Stroll at the Austrian Grand Prix

The AMR24 was revealed on 12 February 2024. It featured a livery largely similar to the AMR22 and AMR23, although title sponsor Aramco had greater presence on the car, along the sidepods, front wing and rear wing. The livery featured more bare carbon fibre, to save weight, a trend seen across the grid in 2024.

== Complete Formula One results ==
Key

Key
Colour	Result
Gold	Winner
Silver	Second place
Bronze	Third place
Green	Other points position
Blue	Other classified position
Blue	Not classified, finished (NC)
Purple	Not classified, retired (Ret)
Red	Did not qualify (DNQ)
Black	Disqualified (DSQ)
White	Did not start (DNS)
White	Race cancelled (C)
Blank	Did not practice (DNP)
Blank	Excluded (EX)
Blank	Did not arrive (DNA)
Blank	Withdrawn (WD)
Blank	Did not enter (empty cell)
Annotation	Meaning
P	Pole position
F	Fastest lap
Superscript number	Points-scoring position in sprint

Year	Entrant	Power unit	Tyres	Driver name	Grands Prix																								Points	WCC pos.
Year	Entrant	Power unit	Tyres	Driver name	BHR	SAU	AUS	JPN	CHN	MIA	EMI	MON	CAN	ESP	AUT	GBR	HUN	BEL	NED	ITA	AZE	SIN	USA	MXC	SAP	LVG	QAT	ABU	Points	WCC pos.
2024	Aston Martin Aramco F1 Team	Mercedes-AMG F1 M15	P	Fernando Alonso	9	5	8	6	7^{F}	9	19	11	6	12	18^{F}	8	11	8	10	11	6	8	13	Ret	14	11	7	9	94	5th
2024	Aston Martin Aramco F1 Team	Mercedes-AMG F1 M15	P	Lance Stroll	10	Ret	6	12	15	17	9	14	7	14	13	7	10	11	13	19	19†	14	15	11	DNS	15	Ret	14	94	5th
