= Eric Blandin =

French aerodynamicist

- Born: France
- Education: Pierre and Marie Curie University (BS, MS, MAS)
- Occupation: Aerodynamicist
- Years active: 1998–present
- Employer: Cadillac

Eric Blandin is a French aerodynamicist who currently serves as the Head of Aerodynamics at Cadillac; having previously served as Aerodynamics Director and Deputy Technical Director at Aston Martin Formula One Team and Chief Aerodynamicist at Mercedes.

== Career ==
In 1998, after finishing his master's degree in fluid mechanics at Pierre and Marie Curie University, Blandin began his career as an aerodynamicist at Fondmetal Technologies, working in the production of wind tunnels. In 2002, he transferred to the Jaguar Formula 1 team, working in the aerodynamics field. Blandin remained with the Milton Keynes-based team following its transformation to Red Bull Racing, becoming a team leader in the aerodynamics department before departing at the end of 2009. During this period, he worked alongside Dan Fallows.

In January 2010, Blandin moved to Ferrari, serving as an Aerodynamic Team Leader before joining Mercedes as principal aerodynamicist the following year. In 2017, he was promoted to the position of chief aerodynamicist.

On November 24, 2021, it was announced that Blandin would leave Mercedes and join the Aston Martin team in early 2022. The team did not specify what role Blandin will fill. However, it was later disclosed that Blandin will commence work at Aston Martin in July 2022, after a period of gardening leave.

From July 2022 to December 2024, Blandin served as the Deputy to Technical Director Dan Fallows. During his time as Deputy Technical Director, Blandin contributed to the development of the AMR23, AMR24 and AMR25. In January 2025, Blandin was appointed as Aerodynamics Director, following the removal of Dan Fallows as Technical Director and the discontinuation of both the Technical Director and Deputy Technical Director roles with the impending arrival of Managing Technical Partner Adrian Newey and Chief Technical Officer Enrico Cardile.

In May 2026, Blandin departed Aston Martin and established his own consultancy firm, EB Enginnering Consulting, similar to a path taken by his former colleague, Dan Fallows following his own removal as Technical Director.

On September 24, 2026, he was announced to be joining Cadillac as Head of Aerodynamics, replacing Jon Tomlinson.
