= Aston Martin AMR25 =

2025 Formula One car

- An AMR25 driven by Fernando Alonso during the Austrian Grand Prix
- Category: Formula One
- Designers: Bob Bell (Executive Director, Technical); Dan Fallows (Technical Director); Eric Blandin (Deputy Technical Director); Luca Furbatto (Engineering Director); Tom McCullough (Performance Director); Tim Wright (Deputy Performance Director); Akio Haga (Chief Designer); Bruce Eddington (Deputy Chief Designer, Composites); Daniel Carpenter (Deputy Chief Designer, Mechanical); William Worrall (Chief Engineer - Performance Optimisation & Analytics; Craig Gardiner (Deputy Chief Engineer, Vehicle Performance; Ian Greig (Head of Aerodynamics); Mark Robinson (Chief Aerodynamicist); Michael Hart (Deputy Chief Aerodynamicist)
- Predecessor: Aston Martin AMR24
- Successor: Aston Martin AMR26

Technical specifications
- Weight: 800 kg (including driver, excluding fuel)
- Fuel: Aramco
- Lubricants: Valvoline
- Tyres: Pirelli P Zero (Dry/Slick); Pirelli Cinturato (Wet/Treaded)

Competition history
- Notable entrants: Aston Martin Aramco F1 Team
- Notable drivers: 14. (Spain) Fernando Alonso; 18. (Canada) Lance Stroll
- Debut: 2025 Australian Grand Prix
- Last event: 2025 Abu Dhabi Grand Prix
Races	Wins	Podiums	Poles	F/Laps
24	0	0	0	0

The Aston Martin AMR25 is a Formula One racing car designed and developed by the Aston Martin Aramco F1 Team which competed in the 2025 Formula One World Championship. It is the fifth Formula One car entered by Aston Martin since rejoining the sport in 2021, and was driven by two-time world champion Fernando Alonso and teammate Lance Stroll. Reserve driver duties were handled by Felipe Drugovich and Stoffel Vandoorne.

== Background ==
=== Livery ===
All ten teams, including Aston Martin, unveiled their livery on 18 February 2025 at a dedicated event.

At the Chinese Grand Prix, the team paid tribute to Eddie Jordan (the founder of Jordan Grand Prix, the team's ancestor), who died right before the race weekend. His name and team logo with a red leaf that represents heart were present on the side of the car and a side of the rear wing. Aston Martin ran the season with minimal changes, with the team introducing a science-themed livery for the United States Grand Prix.

=== Development ===
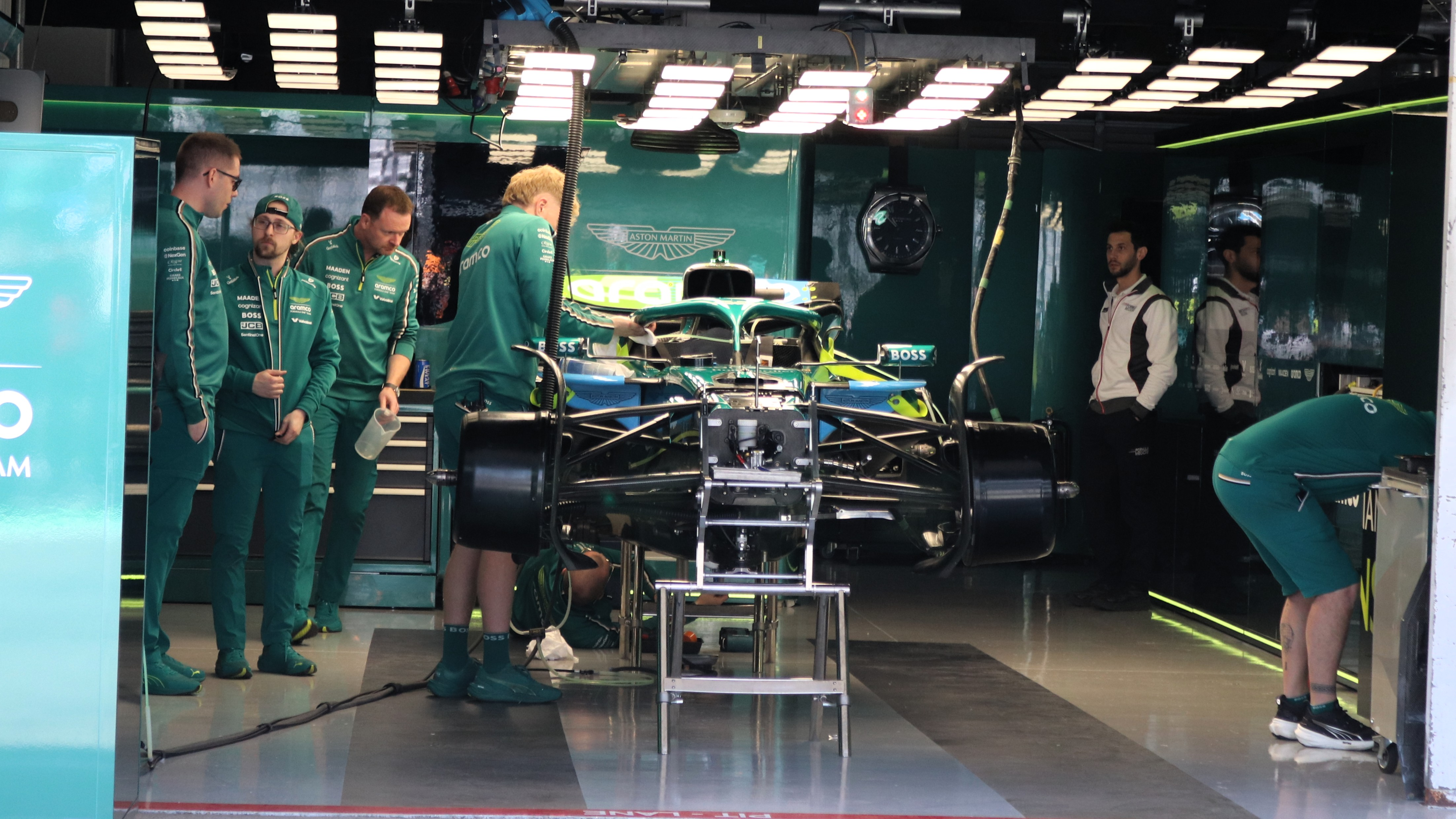
The AMR25 made several iterations on its predecessor as the last Mercedes-powered Aston Martin.

The AMR25 differentiates itself from the AMR24 with a new front wing, new side pods, and a detached upper wing plane. The new sidepod and bodywork design complement this, allowing better management of airflow under the car and over the rear wing. The AMR25 has push-rod suspension at both the front and rear; the suspension is connected to the chassis by a diagonal structure with a higher point on the car's bodywork. The floor design has been revised to improve airflow under the car. The AMR25 was the last Aston Martin car to utilise Mercedes power units, as the team signed a deal with Honda to utilise their engines from the 2026 season.

== Complete Formula One results ==
Key

Key
Colour	Result
Gold	Winner
Silver	Second place
Bronze	Third place
Green	Other points position
Blue	Other classified position
Blue	Not classified, finished (NC)
Purple	Not classified, retired (Ret)
Red	Did not qualify (DNQ)
Black	Disqualified (DSQ)
White	Did not start (DNS)
White	Race cancelled (C)
Blank	Did not practice (DNP)
Blank	Excluded (EX)
Blank	Did not arrive (DNA)
Blank	Withdrawn (WD)
Blank	Did not enter (empty cell)
Annotation	Meaning
P	Pole position
F	Fastest lap
Superscript number	Points-scoring position in sprint

Year	Entrant	Power unit	Tyres	Driver name	Grands Prix																								Points	WCC pos.
Year	Entrant	Power unit	Tyres	Driver name	AUS	CHN	JPN	BHR	SAU	MIA	EMI	MON	ESP	CAN	AUT	GBR	BEL	HUN	NED	ITA	AZE	SIN	USA	MXC	SAP	LVG	QAT	ABU	Points	WCC pos.
2025	Aston Martin Aramco F1 Team	Mercedes-AMG F1 M16 E Performance 1.6 V6 t	P	(Spain) Fernando Alonso	Ret	Ret	11	15	11	15	11	Ret	9	7	7	9	17	5	8	Ret	15	7	10	Ret	14^{6}	11	7^{7}	6	89	7th
2025	Aston Martin Aramco F1 Team	Mercedes-AMG F1 M16 E Performance 1.6 V6 t	P	(Canada) Lance Stroll	6	9	20	17	16	16^{5}	15	15	WD	17	14	7	14	7	7	18	17	13	12	14	16	Ret	17†	10	89	7th
