= Aston Martin AMR26 =

2026 Formula One car

- Fernando Alonso driving the Aston Martin AMR26 at the Austrian Grand Prix
- Category: Formula One
- Designers: Adrian Newey (Team Principal); Enrico Cardile (Chief Technical Officer); Bob Bell (Executive Director, Technical); Luca Furbatto (Engineering Director); Marco Fainello (Performance Director); Tim Wright (Deputy Performance Director); Eric Blandin (Aerodynamics Director); Giles Wood (Simulation and Vehicle Modelling Director); Duncan Elliott (Chief Designer); Andy Cowell (Chief Strategy Officer); Tetsushi Kakuda (Large Project Leader - Honda)
- Predecessor: Aston Martin AMR25

Technical specifications
- Chassis: Carbon fibre composite with survival cell and honeycomb structure
- Engine: Honda RA626H 1.6 L (98 cu in) Turbo Rear-mid mounted
- Electric motor: Honda Kinetic energy recovery system
- Transmission: Aston Martin 8-speed + 1 reverse sequential seamless semi-automatic transmission operated via paddle shifters
- Battery: Honda lithium-ion battery
- Weight: 770 kg (including driver, excluding fuel)
- Fuel: Aramco ProForce+
- Lubricants: Valvoline SynPower
- Tyres: Pirelli P Zero (Dry/Slick); Pirelli Cinturato (Wet/Treaded); with Fondmetal forged magnesium wheels: 18"

Competition history
- Notable entrants: Aston Martin Aramco F1 Team
- Notable drivers: 14. (Spain) Fernando Alonso; 18. (Canada) Lance Stroll
- Debut: 2026 Australian Grand Prix
- Last event: 2026 São Paulo Grand Prix
Races	Wins	Podiums	Poles	F/Laps
20	0	0	0	0

The Aston Martin AMR26 is a Formula One car designed and built by Aston Martin to compete in the 2026 Formula One World Championship. It is the sixth Formula One car entered by Aston Martin since rejoining the sport in 2021 and the first designed by Adrian Newey. It is currently being driven by two-time world champion Fernando Alonso and teammate Lance Stroll, in their fourth and sixth season with Aston Martin, respectively.

== Background ==
=== Development ===
Significant changes to the technical regulations were introduced for 2026, affecting both the chassis and engine. Therefore, the AMR26 features significant changes from its predecessor, the AMR25.

==== Engine ====
The AMR26 is powered by the Honda RA626H power unit, Honda's first since the manufacturer's return to the sport as a fully fledged engine builder in 2026 and the first in an Aston Martin. The AMR26 is the first Silverstone-built Formula One car to utilise a power unit from a Japanese manufacturer since the customer Toyota-engined Midland M16 in 2006 as well as the first one with a Honda power unit since the Jordan EJ12 in 2002. It is also the first Aston Martin to be designed by Adrian Newey and Enrico Cardile following their departures from Red Bull Racing and Ferrari, respectively. The AMR26 is also the first Formula One car to utilise works Honda engines since the Red Bull Racing RB16B and Scuderia AlphaTauri AT02 in the 2021 season, also the first Silverstone-built car to utilise an engine supplier other than Mercedes since the Ferrari-powered Force India VJM01 in the 2008 season and also the first-Honda powered Formula One car to utilize a fuel and lubricant supplier other than ExxonMobil since the McLaren MCL32 in the 2017 season when it used BP fuel and Castrol lubricant products due to Aston Martin's existing partnerships with Aramco and Valvoline. The AMR26, and by extension the RA626H, debuted on track at a private pre-season shakedown at Circuit de Barcelona-Catalunya on 27 January.

==== Development deficits ====
During the shakedown and subsequent test at Bahrain International Circuit, the Honda engine showcased numerous deficits; not only did the team observe lower mileage than other teams, but the team recorded three breakdowns over all the tests, and during the latter test, its recorded fastest time was four seconds slower than rival power units. Honda confirmed that vibrations in the engine were damaging the battery system.

The poor performance and unreliability of the Honda engine was so noticeable that Honda used up most of their spare parts during the Bahrain test alone, leaving them unprepared for the Australian Grand Prix to the point that they considered skipping the round by qualifying within the 107% rule and retiring early to conserve parts. Furthermore, Honda admitted that the engine vibrations were strong enough that driving the car for an extended period of time could cause nerve damage. The vibrations also disallowed Honda from running the car at its full potential.

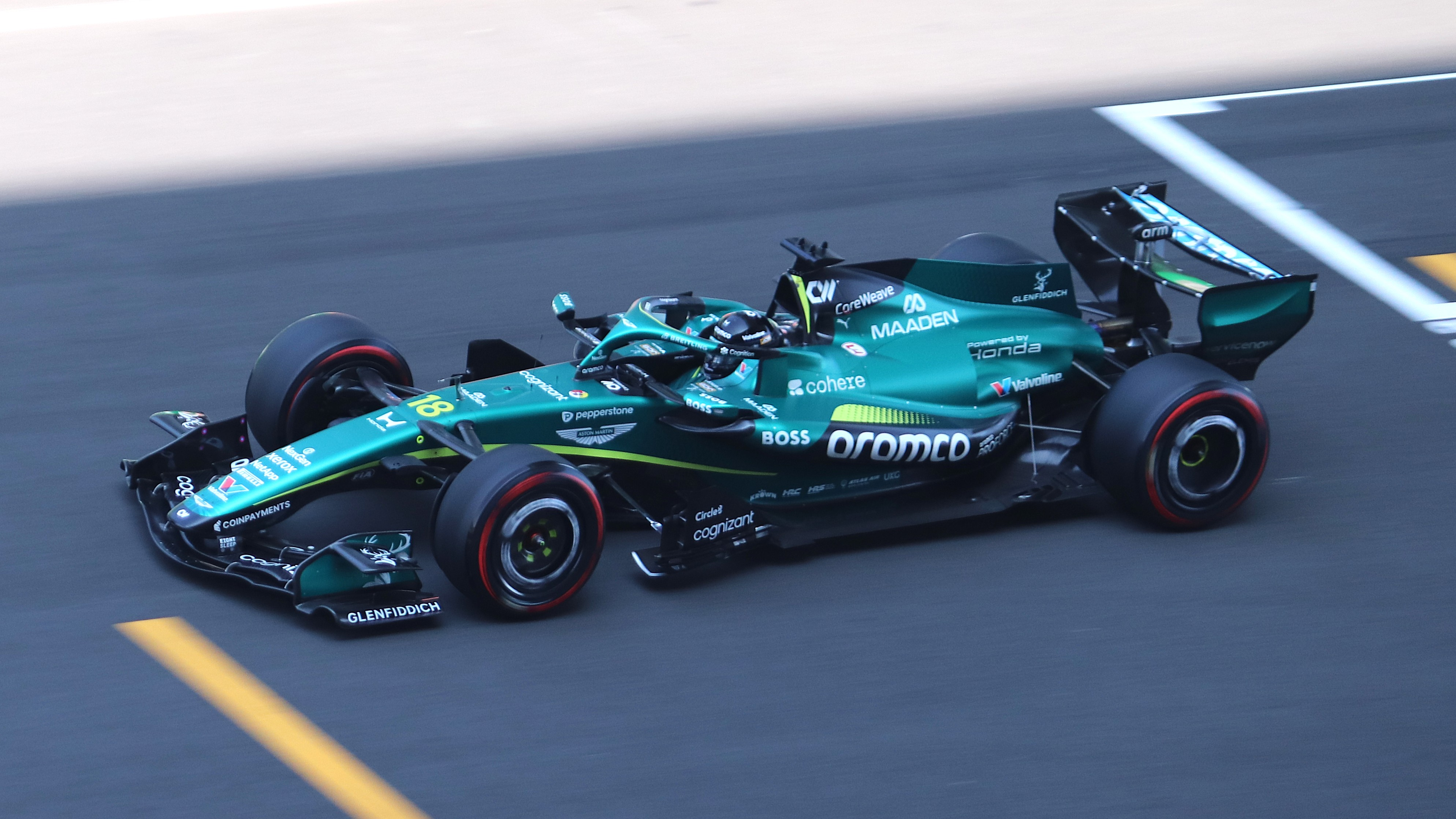
Stroll at the Chinese Grand Prix, a race where both cars failed to finish the race.

For the first race, the team was considering a run limit of 25 laps before retiring both cars. While Stroll was able to participate in the first practice, power unit issues forced Alonso out of participating. Stroll completed three laps before suffering similar issues. Due to these issues, the team used up all of their spare battery supplies, with the remaining two batteries left running in the cars themselves. Stroll was forced out of third practice due to an ICE issue. Despite a great start, passing seven cars on the first half of the opening lap, Alonso failed to finish the race after suffering an engine issue, but became the first driver to be sent back out into the race after retiring since Sergio Pérez in the 2023 Japanese Grand Prix, before then retiring for a second time. Stroll was also sent back into the race after retiring, and was able to finish but was not classified, finishing 15 laps down. A similar thing was observed at the Chinese Grand Prix, with Alonso retiring due to the vibrations.

The vibrations were reportedly resolved by the Japanese Grand Prix, Honda's home race, after Aston Martin tested a part on the Friday practice sessions that attempted to mitigate the issue. Alonso finished the race in 18th, marking Aston Martin's first finish of the year.

While resolving the vibration issue, Aston Martin's car remained the worst on pace, usually bringing up the back of the field and either retiring or finishing behind a Cadillac. The team scored its first point at the Monaco Grand Prix. The Hungarian Grand Prix saw the team roll out an extensive upgrade package. Alonso finished the first practice session in thirteenth, which was Aston Martin's best session to date. Alonso would secure more points for the team; first by finishing ninth at the Dutch Grand Prix and then eighth at the Bahrain Grand Prix, which was Aston Martin's best finish to date. The São Paulo Grand Prix saw the team achieve their best qualifying result of the season, with Alonso qualifying 8th during a wet session, achieving the team's first Q3 appearance of the year. In the race, Alonso tangled with Ollie Bearman in turn 3 and finished the race 12th with nosecone damage, meanwhile Stroll retired once again.

=== Livery ===
The livery was revealed during a live event on 9 February 2026. While similar to its predecessor, the AMR26 featured a satin finish compared to the traditional metallic finish, as well as featuring a darker airbox and light blue rear wing.

== Complete Formula One results ==
Key

Key
Colour	Result
Gold	Winner
Silver	Second place
Bronze	Third place
Green	Other points position
Blue	Other classified position
Blue	Not classified, finished (NC)
Purple	Not classified, retired (Ret)
Red	Did not qualify (DNQ)
Black	Disqualified (DSQ)
White	Did not start (DNS)
White	Race cancelled (C)
Blank	Did not practice (DNP)
Blank	Excluded (EX)
Blank	Did not arrive (DNA)
Blank	Withdrawn (WD)
Blank	Did not enter (empty cell)
Annotation	Meaning
P	Pole position
F	Fastest lap
Superscript number	Points-scoring position in sprint

Year	Entrant	Engine	Tyres	Drivers	Grands Prix																							Points	WCC
Year	Entrant	Engine	Tyres	Drivers	AUS	CHN	JPN	MIA	CAN	MON	BCN	AUT	GBR	BEL	HUN	NED	ITA	ESP	AZE	BHR	SIN	USA	MXC	SAP	LVG	QAT	ABU	Points	WCC
2026	Aston Martin Aramco F1 Team	Honda RA626H	P	(Spain) Fernando Alonso	Ret	Ret	18	15	Ret	10	Ret	18	18	19	14	9	Ret	17	Ret	8	16	16	Ret	12				7*	10th*
2026	Aston Martin Aramco F1 Team	Honda RA626H	P	(Canada) Lance Stroll	NC	Ret	Ret	17	15	Ret	Ret	Ret	19	Ret	13	Ret	Ret	Ret	Ret	12	Ret	15	Ret	Ret				7*	10th*

* Season still in progress.
