= Andrew Green (Formula One) =

British engineer (born 1965)

- Born: 14 June 1965 (age 61)
- Citizenship: British
- Occupation: Engineer
- Years active: 1990-2023
- Employer: Aston Martin Performance Technology
- Known for: Formula One engineer
- Title: Chief Technical Officer
- Successor: Enrico Cardile

Andrew Green (born 14 June 1965) is a former British Formula One engineer. He currently serves as the Chief Technical Officer at Aston Martin Performance Technology; he previously served as the former Chief Technical Officer at the Aston Martin Formula 1 Team.

== Biography ==
Green began his career in motorsport when he was involved in the newly formed Jordan Grand Prix team in 1990.

Spending many years as a Race Engineer with Jordan in the mid-1990s, he joined British American Racing in 1998 where he was Head of Mechanical Design, later joining Red Bull Technology as the Head of R&D in 2004.

By 2010, Green was back at Silverstone, with the team now called Force India, after taking over the technical reins of the teams operation, initially working as Director of Engineering. In 2011 Green was appointed Technical Director, a role in which he remained until June 2021.

In 2021, Racing Point was renamed to Aston Martin, which marked Aston Martin's return to Formula 1 after a 61 year absence following their departure in the 1950s. Green was promoted to Chief Technical Officer as part of a reshuffle in the technical team with Dan Fallows taking his place as technical director.

In February 2023, Green was announced to have departed as Chief Technical Officer of the team ahead of the 2023 season as he was moved to the team's Advanced Technology company - Aston Martin Performance Technology as Chief Technical Officer. Technical Director Dan Fallows took over as head of the technical team, though Fallows would later be removed from the position at the end of 2024.

The position of Chief Technical Officer remained vacant following Andrew's departure until the announcement by Aston Martin in 2024 that Technical Director Enrico Cardile of Ferrari will join the team in 2025 as Chief Technical Officer.
