= Ian Hall (engineer) =

British engineer

- Occupation: Engineer
- Employer: Aston Martin Performance Technologies
- Known for: Formula One Engineer
- Title: Chief Designer

Ian Hall is a British Formula One engineer. He is currently chief designer at Aston Martin Performance Technologies, and was previously chief designer for ten years at the Silverstone-based Formula One team.

== Career ==
Hall began his engineering career in 1994 as a design engineer at Hewland, working on transmission and mechanical component design. In 1996, he joined Jordan Grand Prix as Head of Transmissions, overseeing gearbox and drivetrain development for the team’s Formula One cars.

In 2005, Hall moved to the Toyota Racing as Deputy Head of Advanced Projects, contributing to future car development programmes and advanced engineering concepts. He returned to the Silverstone-based team in 2008, when it was competing as Force India F1 Team, where he was appointed chief designer.

From 2008 onwards, Hall served as chief designer through multiple team iterations, including Force India, Racing Point F1 Team and Aston Martin Formula One Team. During this period, the role of chief designer alternated between Hall and Akio Haga, with Hall responsible for the odd-numbered chassis projects beginning with the VJM02, while Haga led development of the even-numbered cars. As Chief Designer, Hall oversaw overall chassis design, technical integration and structural development of the team’s Formula One cars. In 2021 his role slightly shifted with Hall permanently being responsible for the future car and Haga the performance development on the current car.

Following his tenure with the Formula One operation, Hall joined Aston Martin Performance Technologies in 2023 as chief designer, continuing to lead vehicle design and engineering projects across the company’s advanced performance programmes.
