= Dan Fallows =

British aerodynamicist (born 1973)

- Born: Daniel Fallows; 13 November 1973 (age 52); United Kingdom
- Occupation: Engineer
- Years active: 2002–present
- Employer: Racing Bulls
- Known for: Formula One aerodynamicist
- Title: Technical Director
- Predecessor: Jody Egginton

Daniel Fallows (born 13 November 1973) is a British Formula One aerodynamicist who is the Technical Director of Racing Bulls since April 2026. He previously served as the technical director of the Aston Martin Formula One Team from 2022 to 2024, and was also previously Chief Engineer and Head of Aerodynamics at Red Bull Racing.

== Career ==
Fallows started his career in Formula One when he was recruited in 2002 by Jaguar Racing as a senior aerodynamicist. When Ford announced its decision to stop its involvement in Formula One, he moved to Italian chassis builder Dallara.

=== Red Bull Racing (2006–2021) ===
In 2006, Fallows returned to the Milton Keynes outfit, which had now become Red Bull Racing, where he took on the role of team leader in the aerodynamics department, helping the team to its first podiums, victories and ultimately to a combination eight world titles in four years between 2010 and 2013. In 2014, he stepped up to become Chief Engineer for Aerodynamics and subsequently helped shape the team's progress through Formula One's hybrid era from the Red Bull RB11 to the Red Bull RB16. The RB18 for the new ground effect era from 2022 was the final Red Bull Challenger Fallows had contributed in the development before his gardening leave and subsequent departure for Aston Martin.

=== Aston Martin (2022–2025) ===
In June 2021, it was announced that Fallows would join the Aston Martin team from April 2022 as Technical Director, after a period of gardening leave. Following former Chief Technical Officer Andrew Green's departure as Chief Technical Officer ahead of the 2023 Formula One season, Fallows became the head of the technical team and subsequently led the design of the AMR24 and AMR25. Fallows was subsequently removed from his position as Technical Director in November 2024, with Aston Martin's slump in performance in the 2024 season as the reason cited for his departure. He would subsequently be succeeded by his former boss at Red Bull Racing, Adrian Newey, who joined in March 2025 as Managing Technical Partner, and former Scuderia Ferrari Technical Director for Chassis Enrico Cardile, who commenced work at Aston Martin from 4 August as Chief Technical Officer. Fallows subsequently served as Chief Engineer for Aston Martin Performance Technologies from November 2024 to April 2025, where he subsequently departed from Aston Martin entirely.

=== Hiperformant (2025–2026) ===
Following his departure from Aston Martin, Fallows founded his own management consultancy firm, Hiperformant, which is where his extensive Formula One expertise is applied to "high performance engineering and business development projects".

=== Racing Bulls (2026–present) ===
On 23 January, it was announced that Fallows would be returning to the Red Bull Family, this time at Red Bull's sister team Racing Bulls, as Technical Director, succeeding former Technical Director Jody Egginton who left for Red Bull Advanced Technologies. Fallows will commence work in his new role at the team in April, reporting to Chief Technical Officer Tim Goss.
