= Tom McCullough =

British engineer

- Born: 22 September 1975 (age 51)
- Citizenship: British
- Occupation: Engineer
- Years active: 2002–present
- Employer: Aston Martin Performance Technologies
- Known for: Formula One engineer

Tom McCullough (born 22 September 1975) is a British Formula One engineer who currently serves as the Performance Director of Aston Martin Performance Technologies and was most recently the Performance Director at the Aston Martin F1 Team. He is set to join Red Bull Racing as the new 'Head of Racing' from 2027.

== Career ==
McCullough spent his time at University competing in amateur motorsport, participating in some Formula Ford 2000 events. Following three years in Formula Ford, McCullough decided that he was more cut out to be an engineer rather than a driver and therefore he began his motorsport engineering career at Reynard Motorsport working on Le Mans projects for Panoz and Cadillac. This gave McCullough hands-on experience to complement his Automotive Engineering studies. He then focussed on Reynard's IndyCar projects in the late 1990s, joining the research and development department.

When Reynard ceased to exist in 2002, McCullough joined Formula One working for Williams Racing, originally working as a data engineer before moving on to become a race engineer. He spent several seasons with the team, working with the likes of Nico Hülkenberg, Rubens Barrichello and Bruno Senna, before leaving Williams at the end of 2012. Following a brief spell at Sauber as head of track engineering in 2013, he returned to the UK from Switzerland, heading up the trackside engineering office at the Force India team. Under McCullough's oversight, the Silverstone-based team has had immense success, including Force India's historic fourth-place finishes in 2016 and 2017 and a victory for Racing Point in 2020 in which the team also finished in fourth.

McCullough's role as Performance Director at the newly renamed Aston Martin Team, consisted of extracting the maximum performance out of both cars on any given weekend. He worked closely with the engineering teams on both sides of the Aston Martin garage and the performance groups back in the factory to ensure that both cars benefit from the best available information at a race weekend.

In January 2025, an organisational restructuring was announced, with former Team Principal Mike Krack demoted and Group CEO Andy Cowell absorbing Krack's Team Principal duties while Krack assuming the role of Chief Trackside Officer and absorbing McCullough's responsibilities. McCullough was moved to a leadership position in the Group where he would play a role in the "expansion of the team's broader range of racing categories" due to his responsibilities being taken over by Krack. According to his LinkedIn, he moved to the team's technology company, Aston Martin Performance Technologies, as Performance Director.

On 1 September 2026, Red Bull Racing announced McCullough will assume the role of head of racing from 2027.
