= Aston Martin in Formula One =

Formula One activities of Aston Martin

(United Kingdom) Aston Martin Aramco-Honda
- Full name: Aston Martin Aramco Formula One Team
- Base: Newport Pagnell, Buckinghamshire, England (1959–1960); Silverstone, Northamptonshire, England (2021–present)
- Team principal(s): Lawrence Stroll (Chairman); Adrian Newey (Team Principal and Managing Technical Partner)
- Chief Technical Officer: Enrico Cardile
- Website: astonmartinf1.com
- Previous name: Racing Point F1 Team

2026 Formula One World Championship
- Race drivers: 14. (Spain) Fernando Alonso; 18. (Canada) Lance Stroll
- Test driver(s): (United States) Jak Crawford (Belgium) Stoffel Vandoorne
- Chassis: AMR26
- Engine: Honda RA626H
- Tyres: Pirelli

Formula One World Championship career
- First entry: 1959 Dutch Grand Prix
- Last entry: 2026 São Paulo Grand Prix
- Races entered: 140 (139 starts)
- Engines: Aston Martin, Mercedes, Honda
- Constructors' Championships: 0
- Drivers' Championships: 0
- Race victories: 0
- Podiums: 9
- Points: 602
- Pole positions: 0
- Fastest laps: 3
- 2025 position: 7th (89 pts)

Aston Martin as a Formula One engine manufacturer
Formula One World Championship career
- First entry: 1959 Dutch Grand Prix
- Last entry: 1960 British Grand Prix
- Races entered: 6 (5 starts)
- Chassis: Aston Martin
- Constructors' Championships: 0
- Drivers' Championships: 0
- Race victories: 0
- Podiums: 0
- Points: 0
- Pole positions: 0
- Fastest laps: 0

Aston Martin is a British car manufacturer that has participated in Formula One in various iterations. The current team is represented by AMR GP Limited and is competing as Aston Martin Aramco Formula One Team.

The company first participated in Formula One during the 1959 season, where they debuted the DBR4 chassis using their own engine, but it failed to score any points. They continued to perform poorly through the 1960 season, once again failing to score any points. As a result, Aston Martin decided to leave after 1960.

A commercial rebranding of the Racing Point F1 Team, owned by Lawrence Stroll through AMR GP Limited (who is also a shareholder of Aston Martin Lagonda), resulted in the constructor's return in 2021 as a Mercedes power units customer. In 2026, the team began using Honda power units as part of a works partnership with the Japanese manufacturer. The team has two-time World Drivers' Champion Fernando Alonso and Lance Stroll as the drivers pairing since the 2023 season. The team is headquartered in Silverstone and has previously raced under various different names, starting as Jordan Grand Prix in 1991.

== History ==
=== David Brown Corporation (1959–1960) ===
Aston Martin first entered Formula One with the DBR4, their first open-wheel racing car. The DBR4 was first built and tested in 1957 but did not make its Formula One debut until 1959. This delay was caused by the company prioritising the development of the DBR1 sports car, which went on to win the 1959 24 Hours of Le Mans. By the DBR4's world championship debut at the Dutch Grand Prix, it had become outdated and struggled for pace against its competitors, with Carroll Shelby and Roy Salvadori qualifying 10th and 13th respectively out of 15. Salvadori retired from the race in the early laps with an engine failure, with Shelby's car suffering the same fate later in the race.

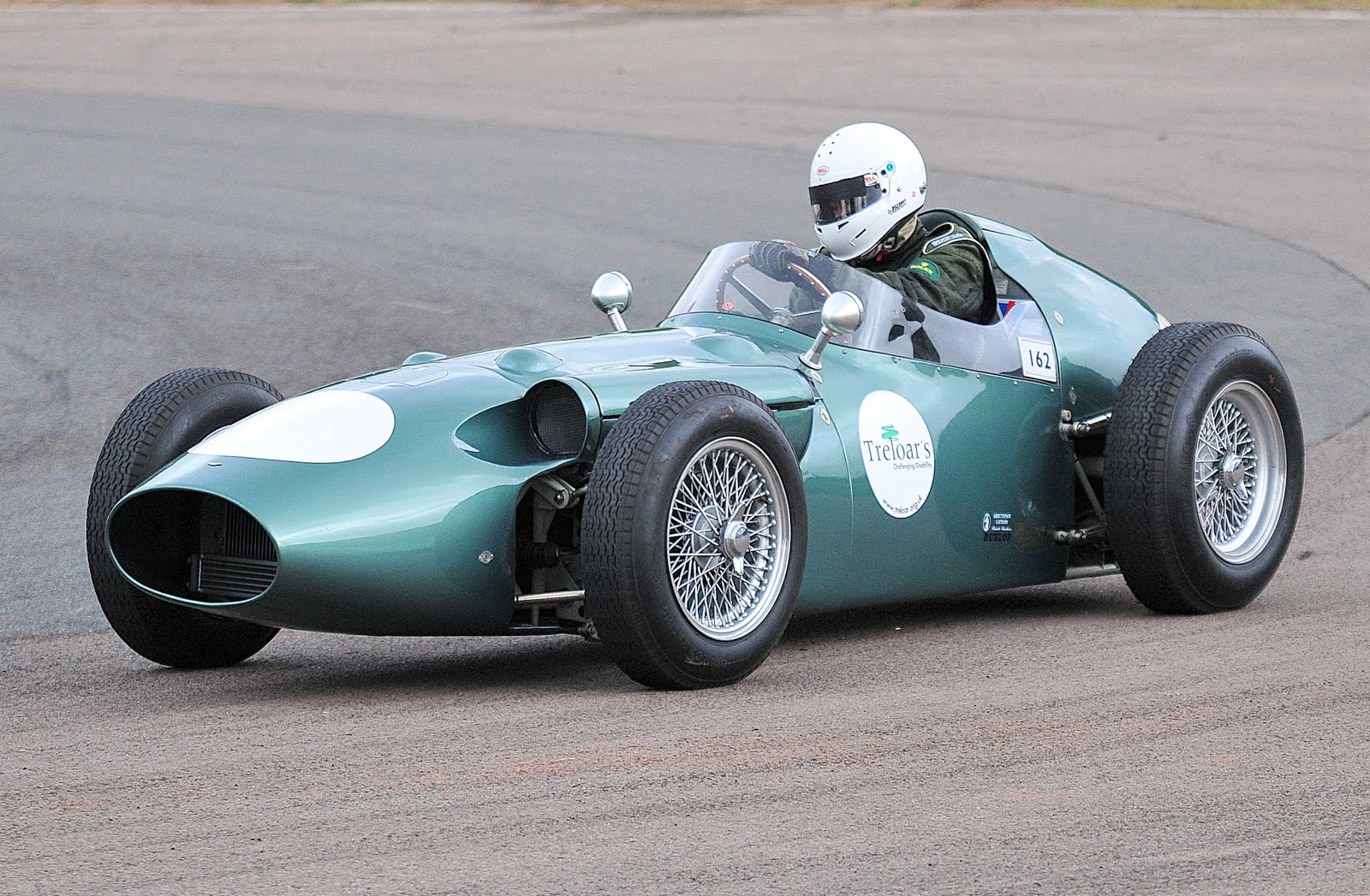
The Aston Martin DBR4 which was driven by Roy Salvadori and Carroll Shelby

The team's next entry came at the British Grand Prix where Salvadori surprised by qualifying in 2nd place. Early in the race, one of Shelby's ignition magnetos failed, harming his car's pace. The second magneto failed late in the race, causing his retirement. Salvadori could only hold on to 6th place, narrowly missing out on a points finish. At the Portuguese Grand Prix, both cars avoided issues to finish 6th and 8th but still failed to score points. Aston Martin's final entry of the season was the Italian Grand Prix where both cars continued to struggle, qualifying only 17th and 19th. During the race, Salvadori had run as high as 7th before suffering an engine failure whilst Shelby came home to finish 10th. The car was significantly outdated by its rivals and failed to score any points.

Aston Martin built the DBR5 to compete in the 1960 season. The DBR5 was based on its predecessor but was lighter and featured an independent suspension. However, the car had a heavy engine in the front and was regularly outclassed by the more commonplace rear-engined cars. The team's first entry of the season came at the Dutch Grand Prix, but the DBR5 was not yet ready to compete. As a result, only Salvadori entered the race, driving the spare DBR4. He could only qualify 18th. Despite being allowed to start the race, Aston Martin were told by the race organisers that they would not be paid. The team, therefore, refused to start the race. The DBR5s were ready for the team's next race in Britain, with Salvadori and Maurice Trintignant taking part. Salvadori retired from the race with steering problems, and Trintignant could only finish 11th, five laps behind the leader.

Because of the poor results, Aston Martin abandoned Formula One entirely after the British Grand Prix to focus on sports car racing.

=== Potential return and sponsorship (2008, 2010, 2016–2020) ===
In 2006, David Richards, who leads the consortium that owns Aston Martin, and his tech firm Prodrive were granted a spot as a potential entrant for the 2008 Formula One World Championship. Upon speculation of an Aston Martin F1 return, Richards made it clear that Aston Martin had a long way to go until it was ready for an F1 team. He believed the route to being competitive was to partner with an existing team, rather than setting up a new team with Aston Martin and Prodrive. In 2009, Richards again announced his intent to return to Formula One in 2010 with the possibility of using the Aston Martin name, however, this did not come to fruition. Between 2016 and 2020 Aston Martin served as a sponsor for Red Bull Racing, and as title sponsor of the team between 2018 and 2020.

=== Aston Martin F1 Team (2021–present) ===
==== Customer Mercedes power units (2021–2025) ====
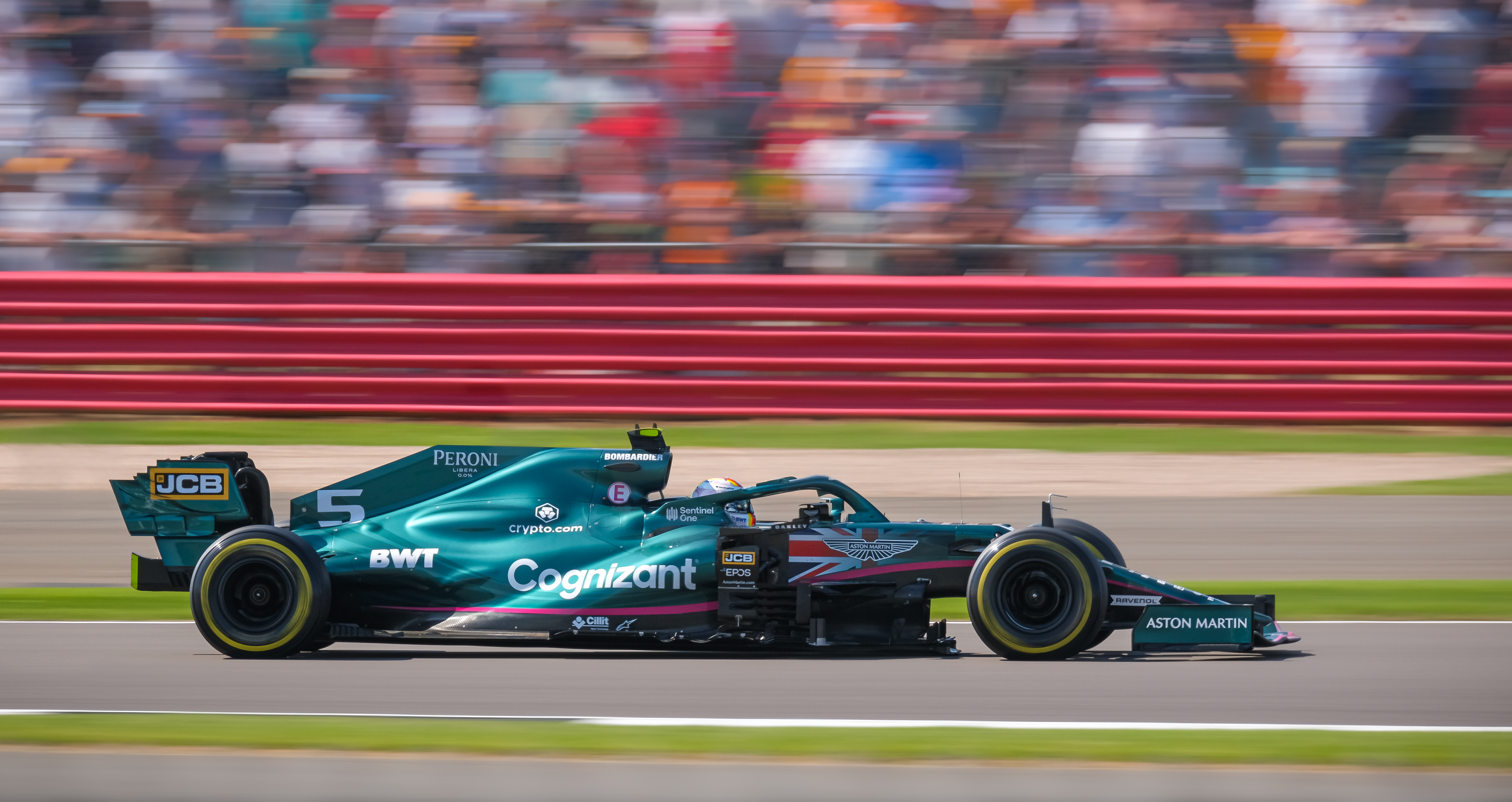
The AMR21 during the 2021 British Grand Prix, driven by Sebastian Vettel

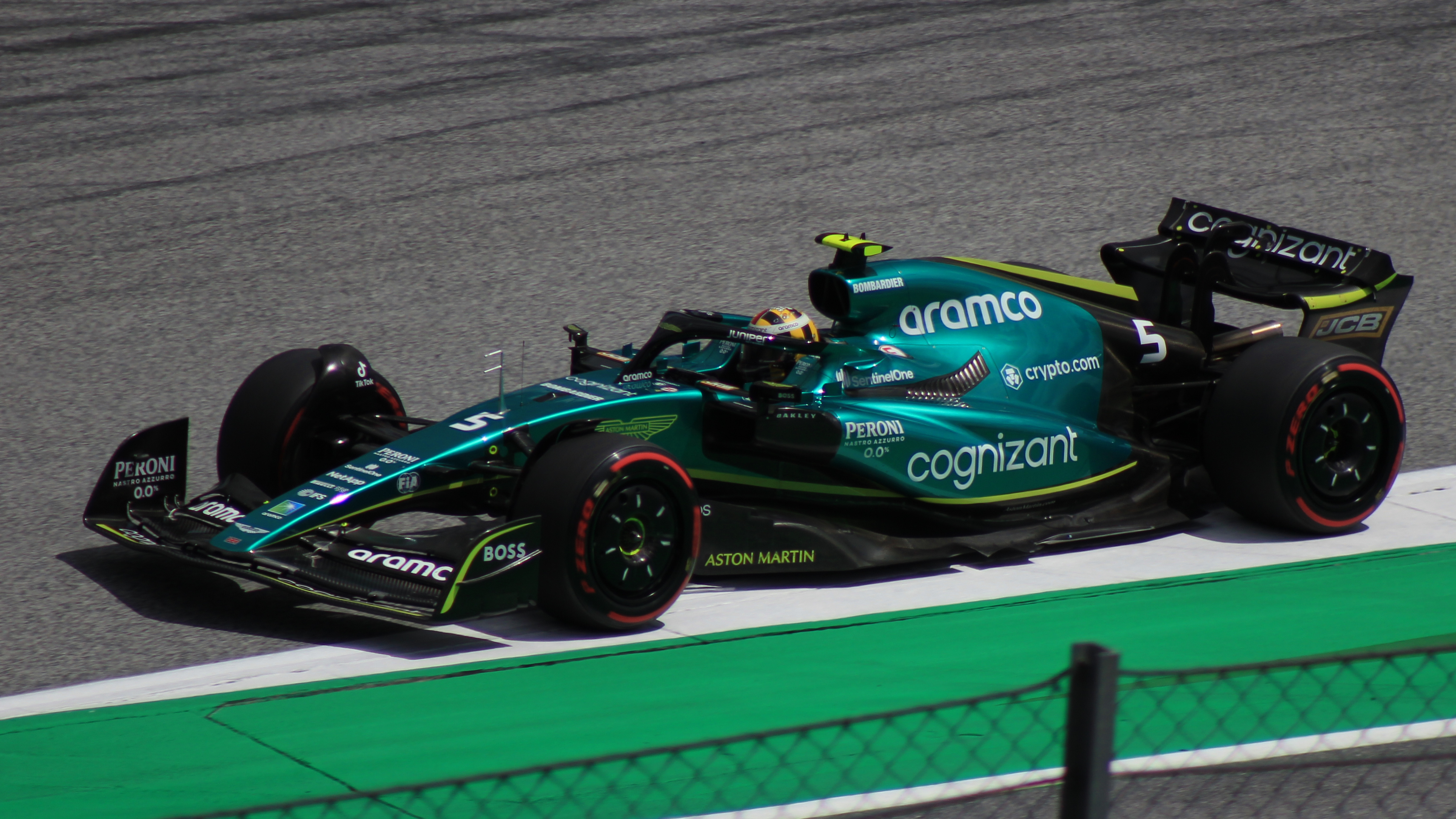
Sebastian Vettel driving the AMR22 during the 2022 Austrian Grand Prix

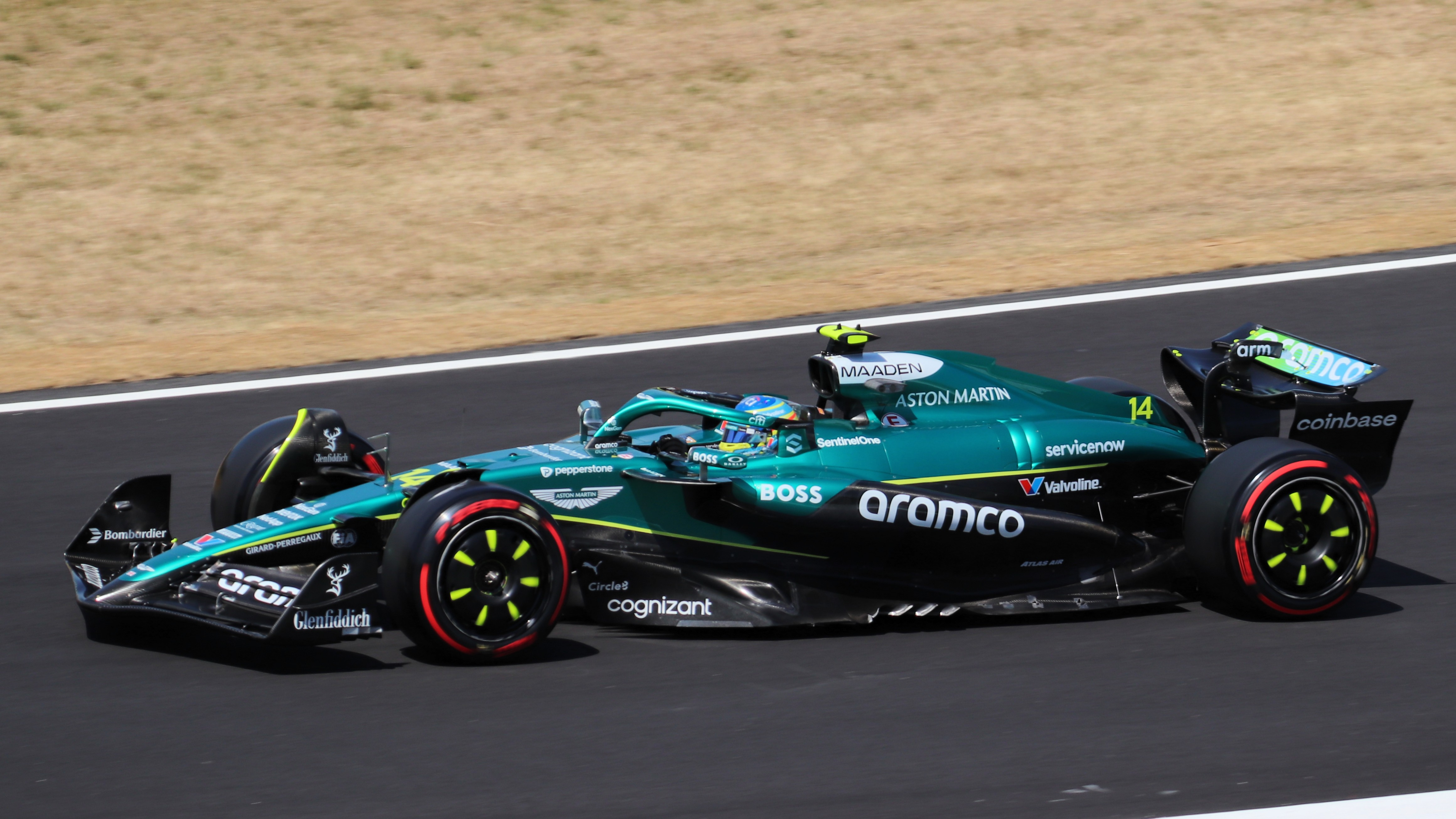
The AMR25 during the 2025 Japanese Grand Prix, driven by Fernando Alonso

An interactive 3D model of the Aston Martin AMR23 (click on it to interact).

In January 2020, a funding investment from Racing Point owner Lawrence Stroll into Aston Martin saw him take a 16.7% stake in the company. This resulted in the commercial rebranding of Racing Point UK's Racing Point F1 Team into Aston Martin F1 Team for the 2021 season. As part of the rebrand, the team switched their racing colour of BWT pink to a modern iteration of Aston Martin's British racing green. Cognizant was also announced as the team's new title sponsor in January 2021. The Aston Martin AMR21 was unveiled in March 2021 and became the first Aston Martin-branded Formula One car after a 61-year absence. The team competes with Mercedes power units, which it has done under its various names since 2009.

Sergio Pérez was under contract to drive for them until 2022, but he was replaced by four-time World Drivers' Champion Sebastian Vettel, who previously drove at Ferrari, for the 2021 championship. He teamed up with Lance Stroll, son of owner Lawrence Stroll, to complete the driver lineup. The team had also signed Nico Hülkenberg as their reserve and development driver.

Vettel earned Aston Martin's first podium by finishing second in the Azerbaijan Grand Prix. Vettel finished second again in the Hungarian Grand Prix, but was disqualified due to a fuel sample issue. In June 2021, Team Principal Otmar Szafnauer confirmed that the team will expand its workforce from 535 to 800 employees.

Also in June, they announced a partnership with the organisation Racing Pride, an NGO (non-governmental organization) dedicated to promoting LGBTQ+ inclusivity throughout the motorsport world. During the 2021 French Grand Prix, their logo was displayed on both cars. In September 2021, Aston Martin confirmed they would compete in 2022 with an unchanged driver lineup. In January 2022, Team Principal Otmar Szafnauer left after having spent 12 years with the team. Mike Krack, who had previously worked on BMW and Porsche motorsport teams, was announced as his replacement in the same month. In February 2022, Aramco was announced as the team's joint title sponsor after having secured a long-term partnership deal. In December 2023, Aramco signed a new five-year agreement to become an exclusive title sponsor for the team, while Cognizant would remain as a strategic partner.

Vettel missed the opening two races of 2022 after testing positive for COVID-19. He returned on the third race of the season at the 2022 Australian Grand Prix. Vettel retired following the conclusion of the 2022 season. Fernando Alonso, a two-time World Champion, is his replacement for 2023 on a multi-year contract. Stoffel Vandoorne joined the team as their new test and reserve driver, a role he shares with Felipe Drugovich. Hülkenberg left Aston Martin, returning as a full-time F1 driver for the Haas F1 Team in 2023.

Construction on a new 37,000 m^{2} (400,000 sq ft) factory at Aston Martin's Silverstone base began in September 2021. The factory features three interconnected buildings and is based in a 40-acre (16 ha) site directly opposite the Silverstone Circuit. Building One will serve as the main building housing the team's design, manufacturing, and marketing resources. Building Two will redevelop and repurpose the original factory premises as a central hub with staff amenities and will also serve as a logistics centre. Building Two is set to house the team's wellness centre, auditorium, simulator and heritage facility, while Building Three will contain the new wind tunnel. Building One was completed in July 2023 followed by Building Two a year later and Building Three was completed in the first week of November 2024. The original Jordan factory, which had housed the team under all its names since 1991, was demolished in the summer of 2023 to make way for the new campus. In 2026 Newey said that working methods carried over from that building had contributed to the team's poor start to the season. Commissioning of the wind tunnel was completed by January 2025, and it became operational mid-March before the start of the 2025 season. Aston Martin is the sixth different constructor to operate from the Silverstone base since 1991.

Aston Martin retained Fernando Alonso and Lance Stroll as their drivers for 2025. Drugovich departed the team after signing with Andretti Global's Formula E team, where he competes from the 2025–26 season. In January 2025, Andy Cowell replaced Krack as team principal.

After the death of Eddie Jordan in March 2025, the team ran a shamrock decal with his name on its cars at the 2025 Chinese Grand Prix, a reference to the logo of Jordan Grand Prix in 1991.

==== Works Honda power units (2026–present) ====
In 2026, Aston Martin began a works partnership with Japanese power unit manufacturer Honda, whose F1 programme was run by its motorsport subsidiary Honda Racing Corporation (HRC). Honda previously powered the two Red Bull-owned teams, Red Bull Racing and Scuderia Toro Rosso, the latter also taking on the Scuderia AlphaTauri and Racing Bulls names. The partnership meant that the team received full factory support from Honda, including bespoke power units designed specifically for their chassis, and the two partners could work together to integrate the chassis and power unit without unwanted compromises. The works team status is often seen as necessary for a team to become a genuine title contender. The Silverstone-based team used customer Mercedes engines for seventeen seasons from 2009 to 2025. (Note: Across this time, the team was known as Force India (2009–July 2018), Racing Point Force India (August–December 2018) and Racing Point (2019–2020) before being renamed Aston Martin.) The team previously ran Mugen-Honda engines between 1998 and 2000 and full Honda units in 2001 and 2002, when it was known as Jordan. The team had also previously ran with a Japanese-licensed engine manufacturer when Toyota supplied its customer engines to Jordan in 2005, and in 2006 when the team was rebranded as Midland. In addition, the Silverstone-based team will produce its own transmission gearbox package for the first time.

Adrian Newey, who left Red Bull Racing in May 2024, signed a deal with Aston Martin in September 2024 and joined the team the following March, in time for the 2026 regulations. Newey also became a major shareholder of Aston Martin. Enrico Cardile, who was announced as the new Chief Technical Officer in July 2024, commenced work in his new position officially the following August. Going into 2026, Cowell was moved to the role of chief strategy officer, with Newey becoming team principal. In February 2026, AMR GP secured the perpetual rights to use the name "Aston Martin F1 Team" in Formula One in a £50 million agreement with Aston Martin Lagonda. In August 2026, former United States ambassador to the United Kingdom and New York Jets owner Woody Johnson acquired a minority stake in the team.

The first season of the Honda partnership began with serious reliability problems. Vibrations from the Honda power unit were damaging the batteries of its hybrid system during pre-season testing, and Aston Martin completed the lowest mileage of any team. Before the 2026 Australian Grand Prix, Newey said that the vibrations transmitted through the chassis meant Alonso could not drive more than 25 consecutive laps, and Stroll more than 15, without risking permanent nerve damage to their hands. He also said the car was behind schedule after a condensed development period, as the team had not been able to test a model in its new wind tunnel until mid-April 2025.

In late September 2026, with the team tenth in the Constructors' Championship, Aston Martin confirmed that Alonso and Stroll would stay for 2027, their fifth season as team-mates.

At the following race, the Bahrain Grand Prix held at Sepang, Alonso finished eighth in wet conditions and gained the team's first points since August.

== Formula One World Championship results ==
=== 1959–1960 ===
(key)

Year	Chassis	Engine	Tyres	Driver	1	2	3	4	5	6	7	8	9	10	Points	WCC
1959	DBR4	Aston Martin RB6 2.5 L6	A		MON	500	NED	FRA	GBR	GER	POR	ITA	USA		0	NC
1959	DBR4	Aston Martin RB6 2.5 L6	A	(United Kingdom) Roy Salvadori			Ret		6		6	Ret			0	NC
1959	DBR4	Aston Martin RB6 2.5 L6	A	(United States) Carroll Shelby			Ret		Ret		8	10			0	NC
1960	DBR4	Aston Martin RB6 2.5 L6	D		ARG	MON	500	NED	BEL	FRA	GBR	POR	ITA	USA	0	NC
1960	DBR4	Aston Martin RB6 2.5 L6	D	(United Kingdom) Roy Salvadori				DNS							0	NC
1960	DBR5	Aston Martin RB6 2.5 L6	D	(United Kingdom) Roy Salvadori							Ret				0	NC
1960	DBR5	Aston Martin RB6 2.5 L6	D	(France) Maurice Trintignant							11				0	NC

=== 2021–present ===
(key)

Year	Chassis	Engine	Tyres	Driver	1	2	3	4	5	6	7	8	9	10	11	12	13	14	15	16	17	18	19	20	21	22	23	24	Points	WCC
2021	AMR21	Mercedes M12 E Performance 1.6 V6 t	P		BHR	EMI	POR	ESP	MON	AZE	FRA	STY	AUT	GBR	HUN	BEL	NED	ITA	RUS	TUR	USA	MXC	SAP	QAT	SAU	ABU			77	7th
2021	AMR21	Mercedes M12 E Performance 1.6 V6 t	P	(Canada) Lance Stroll	10	8	14	11	8	Ret	10	8	13	8	Ret	20	12	7	11	9	12	14	Ret	6	11	13			77	7th
2021	AMR21	Mercedes M12 E Performance 1.6 V6 t	P	(Germany) Sebastian Vettel	15	15†	13	13	5	2	9	12	17†	Ret	DSQ	5‡	13	12	12	18	10	7	11	10	Ret	11			77	7th
2022	AMR22	Mercedes M13 E Performance 1.6 V6 t	P		BHR	SAU	AUS	EMI	MIA	ESP	MON	AZE	CAN	GBR	AUT	FRA	HUN	BEL	NED	ITA	SIN	JPN	USA	MXC	SAP	ABU			55	7th
2022	AMR22	Mercedes M13 E Performance 1.6 V6 t	P	(Canada) Lance Stroll	12	13	12	10	10	15	14	16†	10	11	13	10	11	11	10	Ret	6	12	Ret	15	10	8			55	7th
2022	AMR22	Mercedes M13 E Performance 1.6 V6 t	P	(Germany) Sebastian Vettel			Ret	8	17†	11	10	6	12	9	17	11	10	8	14	Ret	8	6	8	14	11	10			55	7th
2022	AMR22	Mercedes M13 E Performance 1.6 V6 t	P	(Germany) Nico Hülkenberg	17	12																							55	7th
2023	AMR23	Mercedes M14 E Performance 1.6 V6 t	P		BHR	SAU	AUS	AZE	MIA	MON	ESP	CAN	AUT	GBR	HUN	BEL	NED	ITA	SIN	JPN	QAT	USA	MXC	SAP	LVG	ABU			280	5th
2023	AMR23	Mercedes M14 E Performance 1.6 V6 t	P	(Spain) Fernando Alonso	3	3	3	4^{6}	3	2	7	2	5^{5}	7	9	5	2^{F}	9	15	8	6^{8}	Ret	Ret	3	9	7			280	5th
2023	AMR23	Mercedes M14 E Performance 1.6 V6 t	P	(Canada) Lance Stroll	6	Ret	4	7^{8}	12	Ret	6	9	9^{4}	14	10	9	11	16	WD	Ret	11	7	17†	5	5	10			280	5th
2024	AMR24	Mercedes M15 E Performance 1.6 V6 t	P		BHR	SAU	AUS	JPN	CHN	MIA	EMI	MON	CAN	ESP	AUT	GBR	HUN	BEL	NED	ITA	AZE	SIN	USA	MXC	SAP	LVG	QAT	ABU	94	5th
2024	AMR24	Mercedes M15 E Performance 1.6 V6 t	P	(Spain) Fernando Alonso	9	5	8	6	7^{F}	9	19	11	6	12	18^{F}	8	11	8	10	11	6	8	13	Ret	14	11	7	9	94	5th
2024	AMR24	Mercedes M15 E Performance 1.6 V6 t	P	(Canada) Lance Stroll	10	Ret	6	12	15	17	9	14	7	14	13	7	10	11	13	19	19†	14	15	11	DNS	15	Ret	14	94	5th
2025	AMR25	Mercedes M16 E Performance 1.6 V6 t	P		AUS	CHN	JPN	BHR	SAU	MIA	EMI	MON	ESP	CAN	AUT	GBR	BEL	HUN	NED	ITA	AZE	SIN	USA	MXC	SAP	LVG	QAT	ABU	89	7th
2025	AMR25	Mercedes M16 E Performance 1.6 V6 t	P	(Spain) Fernando Alonso	Ret	Ret	11	15	11	15	11	Ret	9	7	7	9	17	5	8	Ret	15	7	10	Ret	14^{6}	11	7^{7}	6	89	7th
2025	AMR25	Mercedes M16 E Performance 1.6 V6 t	P	(Canada) Lance Stroll	6	9	20	17	16	16^{5}	15	15	WD	17	14	7	14	7	7	18	17	13	12	14	16	Ret	17†	10	89	7th
2026	AMR26	Honda RA626H 1.6 V6 t	P		AUS	CHN	JPN	MIA	CAN	MON	BCN	AUT	GBR	BEL	HUN	NED	ITA	ESP	AZE	BHR	SIN	USA	MXC	SAP	LVG	QAT	ABU		7*	10th*
2026	AMR26	Honda RA626H 1.6 V6 t	P	(Spain) Fernando Alonso	Ret	Ret	18	15	Ret	10	Ret	18	18	19	14	9	Ret	17	Ret	8	16	16	Ret	12					7*	10th*
2026	AMR26	Honda RA626H 1.6 V6 t	P	(Canada) Lance Stroll	NC	Ret	Ret	17	15	Ret	Ret	Ret	19	Ret	13	Ret	Ret	Ret	Ret	12	Ret	15	Ret	Ret					7*	10th*

Notes

- * – Season still in progress.
- ^{†} – Driver did not finish the Grand Prix but was classified as they completed over 90% of the race distance.
- ^{‡} – Half points awarded as less than 75% of the race distance was completed.

=== Non-championship Formula One results ===
(key)

Year	Chassis	Engine	Driver	1	2	3	4	5
1959	DBR4	Aston Martin RB6 2.5 L6		GLV	AIN	INT	OUL	SIL
1959	DBR4	Aston Martin RB6 2.5 L6	(United Kingdom) Roy Salvadori			2		
1959	DBR4	Aston Martin RB6 2.5 L6	(United States) Carroll Shelby			6		
1960	DBR4	Aston Martin RB6 2.5 L6		GLV	INT	SIL	LOM	OUL
1960	DBR4	Aston Martin RB6 2.5 L6	(United Kingdom) Roy Salvadori		Ret			

== Driver development programme ==
=== Current drivers ===
Since the team's return to Formula One in 2021, several drivers have been affiliated with Aston Martin F1.

Driver	Years	Current Series	Titles as AMF1 driver
(United States) Jak Crawford	2024–	TBA	None
(Spain) Mari Boya	2025–	FIA Formula 2 Championship; GT World Challenge Europe Endurance Cup	None
(Germany) Mathilda Paatz	2026–	F1 Academy; Formula Winter Series; Formula 4 CEZ Championship	None
(China) Zhenrui Chi	2026–	Formula Regional European Championship	None
(Australia) Ava Lawrence	2026–	Karting (OK-J)	None
(Hungary) Roland Nagy	2026–	Karting (OK-J)	None
(Austria) Niklas Schaufler	2026–	Karting (OK)	None

=== Former drivers ===
Driver	Years	Series competed
(Brazil) Felipe Drugovich	2022–2025	FIA Formula 2 Championship (2022); European Le Mans Series (2024); IMSA SportsCar Championship (2025); Formula E (2024–25)
(Switzerland) Tina Hausmann	2024–2025	Formula 4 UAE Championship (2024); F1 Academy (2024–2025)

Additionally, former W Series driver Jessica Hawkins has served as a driver ambassador for the team since 2021. Hawkins drove the AMR21 during a test session in 2023.
