= Force India VJM10 =

2017 Formula One racing car

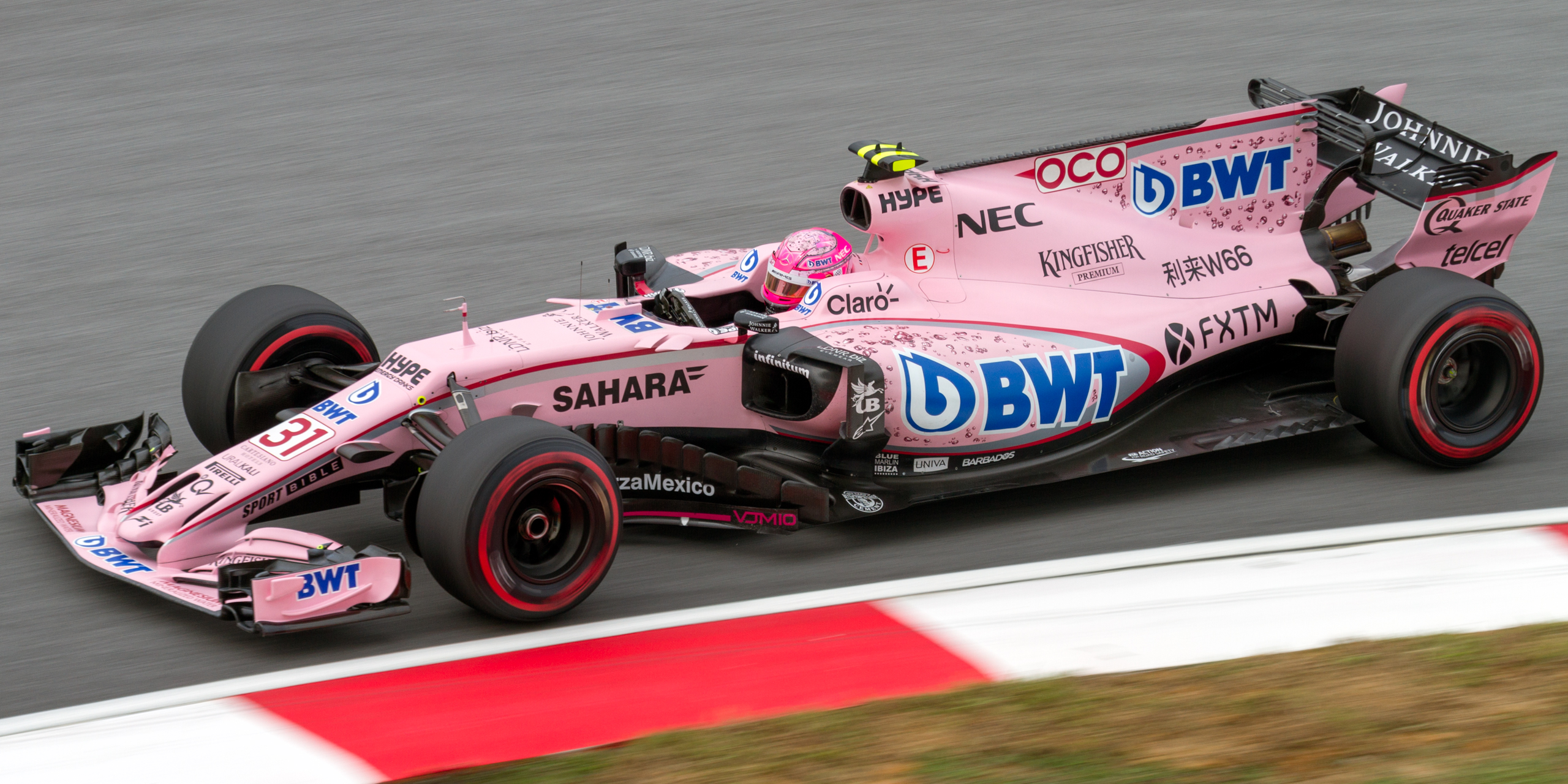
- Esteban Ocon driving the VJM10 at the Malaysian Grand Prix
- Category: Formula One
- Constructor: Force India
- Designers: Andrew Green (Technical Director); Simon Phillips (Aerodynamics Director); Ian Hall (Chief Designer); Bruce Eddington (Head of Design, Composites); Daniel Carpenter (Head of Design, Mechanical); Andrew Brown (Head of R&D); Jonathan Marshall (Head of Vehicle Science); William Worrall (Head of Aerodynamic Performance); Guru Johl (Chief Aerodynamicist)
- Predecessor: Force India VJM09
- Successor: Force India VJM11

Technical specifications
- Chassis: Carbon fibre and honeycomb composite monocoque with Zylon side anti-intrusion panels
- Suspension (front): Aluminium alloy uprights with carbon fibre composite wishbones, trackrod and pushrod inboard chassis mounted torsion springs and anti-roll bar assembly
- Suspension (rear): Aluminium alloy uprights with carbon fibre composite wishbones, trackrod and pullrod hydro-mechanical springs, dampers and anti-roll bar assembly
- Engine: Mercedes-AMG F1 M08 EQ Power+, 1.6 L (98 cu in) direct injection V6 turbocharged engine, limited to 15,000 rpm in a mid-mounted, rear-wheel drive layout
- Electric motor: Kinetic and thermal energy recovery systems
- Transmission: Mercedes semi-automatic sequential gearbox with eight forward and one reverse gear
- Fuel: Petronas Primax
- Lubricants: Petronas Syntium & Tutela (Note: Quaker State branding appeared on the VJM10, but the car used Petronas lubricants.)
- Brakes: AP Racing - 920E (Brakes System); Carbon Industries Carbon brake discs, pads and calipers
- Tyres: Pirelli P Zero (dry) tyres; Pirelli Cinturato (wet) tyres

Competition history
- Notable entrants: Sahara Force India F1 Team
- Notable drivers: 11. (Mexico) Sergio Pérez; 31. (France) Esteban Ocon
- Debut: 2017 Australian Grand Prix
- Last event: 2017 Abu Dhabi Grand Prix
Races	Wins	Podiums	Poles	F/Laps
20	0	0	0	1

The Force India VJM10 is a Formula One racing car designed and constructed by Force India to compete during the 2017 Formula One season. The car was driven by Sergio Pérez and Esteban Ocon, who joined the team after Nico Hülkenberg left the team at the end of the 2016 season. The car made its competitive début at the 2017 Australian Grand Prix.

== Competition history ==
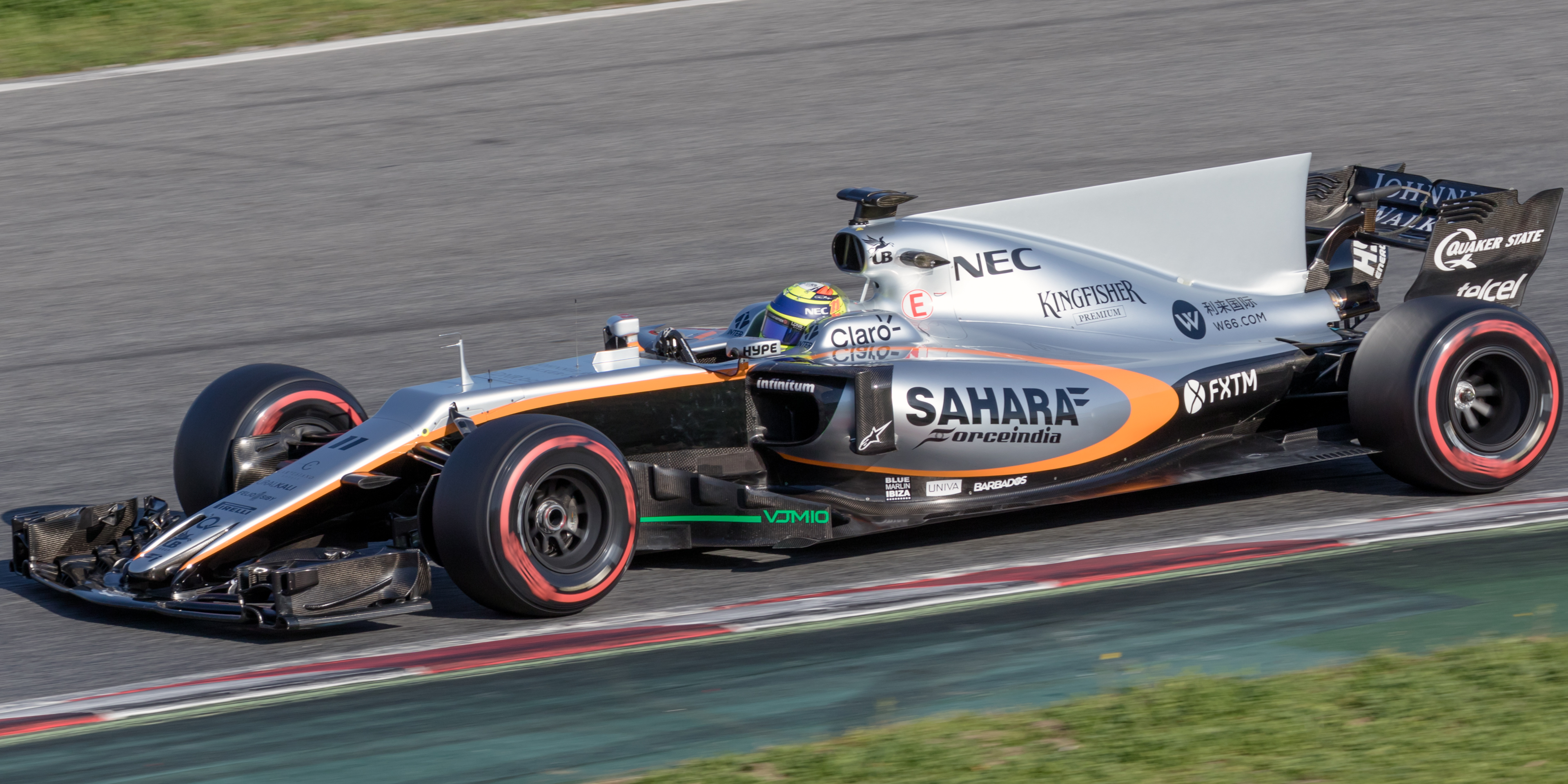
The VJM10 sporting the original livery during pre-season testing

Initially, during pre-season testing the team struggled due to an overweight car and was mired in a very tight midfield battle which included Toro Rosso, Haas, Renault and the Williams team.

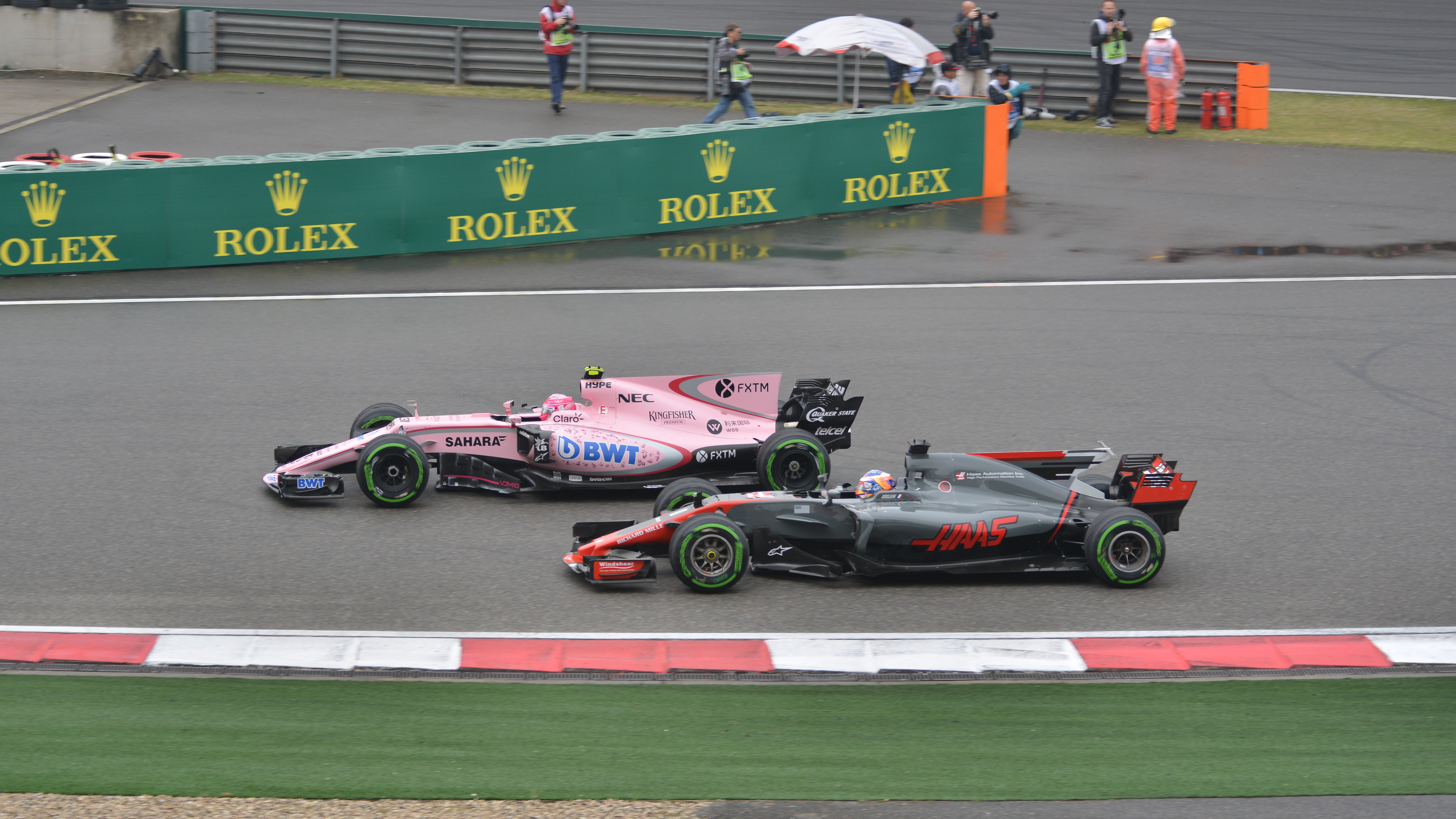
Ocon battling against Haas' Romain Grosjean at the Chinese Grand Prix

The first 5 races saw both drivers record double points finishes, the only team to do so in 2017. This included a hugely impressive 22 points haul at the Spanish GP where Pérez and Ocon finished 4th and 5th respectively. However, the next race at Monaco GP brought the team's points streak to an abrupt end after Pérez had contact with Carlos Sainz Jr. and Ocon picked up a puncture, though Pérez managed to set the fastest lap of the race to salvage something from the poor weekend. At the next race in Canada, they managed to return to their trend of double points finish.

However, at Azerbaijan, both drivers collided with each other whilst fighting for a possible win. This caused Pérez to damage his front left suspension and lose his front wing and eventually retire from the race for the first time in 37 races due to the damage sustained, while Ocon survived with a puncture to recover to 6th after a red flag.

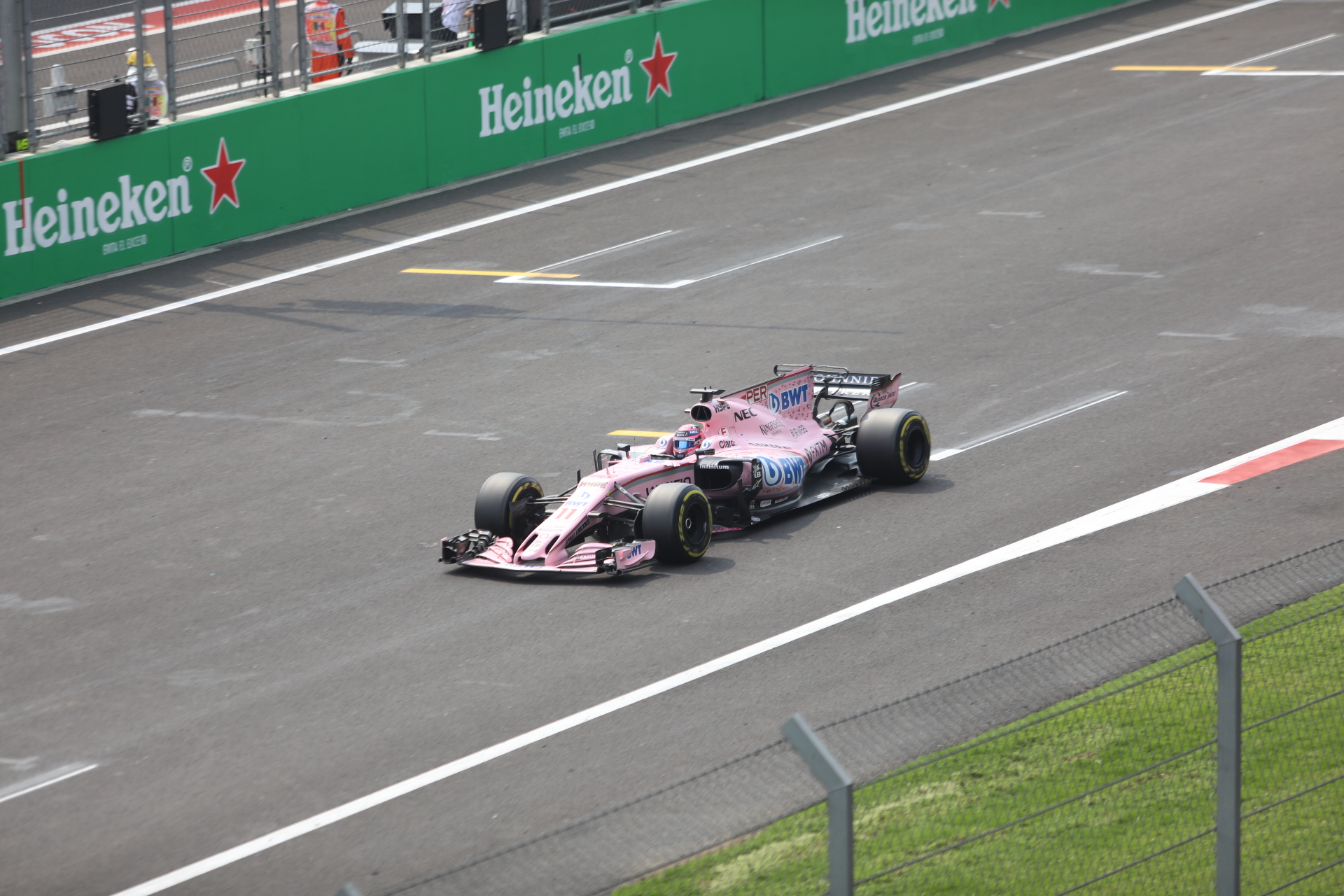
Pérez competing at his home race, the Mexican Grand Prix

Ocon scored points at the next 10 races, with his retirement at the Brazilian Grand Prix halting his 12 consecutive points scoring streak. After his only retirement of the season in Azerbaijan, Pérez finished in the points for every race, barring the Belgian Grand Prix. Although Force India finished 4th in the constructors' standings for the second year in a row, they did score more points than in 2016, with 187, making the 2017 season points tally the highest in the team's history.

== Livery ==
The VJM10 was originally painted in greyish silver livery during the pre-season testing. When the car was launched, it was drastically changed into pink, courtesy from the water treatment company BWT. The team also had a support from Johnnie Walker on the rear wing, however alcohol laws meant Force India could not use the logo in Abu Dhabi, instead by just removing it.

The team supported the breast cancer awareness at the United States Grand Prix because the car itself was already pink.

== Complete Formula One results ==
(key) (results in bold indicate pole position; results in italics indicate fastest lap)

Year	Entrant	Engine	Tyres	Drivers	Grands Prix																				Points	WCC
Year	Entrant	Engine	Tyres	Drivers	AUS	CHN	BHR	RUS	ESP	MON	CAN	AZE	AUT	GBR	HUN	BEL	ITA	SIN	MAL	JPN	USA	MEX	BRA	ABU	Points	WCC
2017	Force India	Mercedes M08 EQ Power+	**P**																							
2017	Force India	Mercedes M08 EQ Power+	**P**	Esteban Ocon	10	10	10	7	5	12	6	6	8	8	9	9	6	10	10	6	6	5	Ret	8	187	4th
2017	Force India	Mercedes M08 EQ Power+	**P**	Sergio Pérez	7	9	7	6	4	13	5	Ret	7	9	8	17†	9	5	6	7	8	7	9	7	187	4th

- † – Driver failed to finish the race, but was classified as they had completed over 90% of the winner's race distance.
