= Force India VJM09 =

Force India Formula One racing car

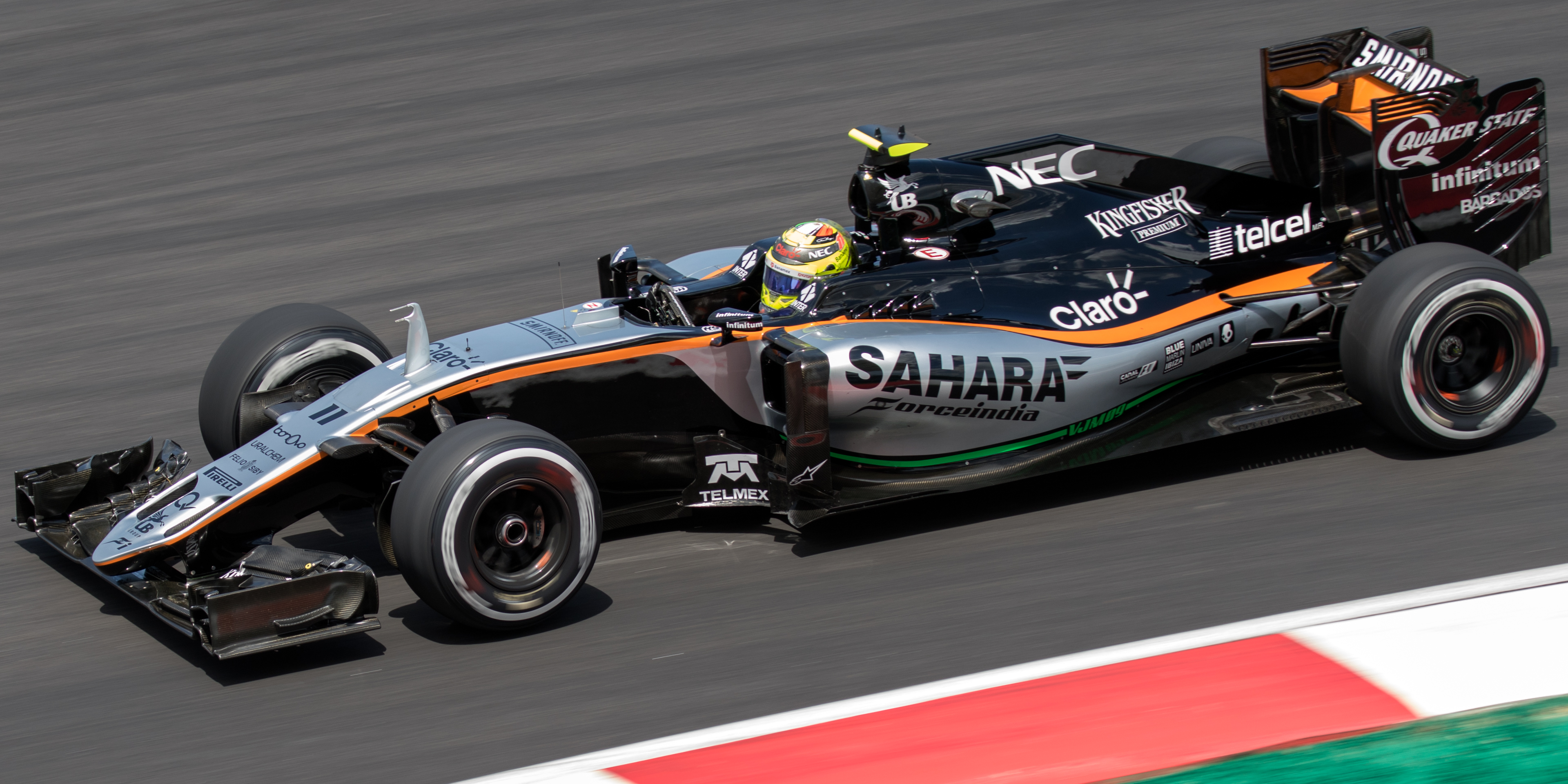
- The Force India VJM09 driven by Sergio Pérez, during the Malaysian Grand Prix
- Category: Formula One
- Constructor: Force India
- Designers: Andrew Green (Technical Director); Simon Phillips (Aerodynamics Director); Akio Haga (Chief Designer); Bruce Eddington (Head of Design, Composites); Daniel Carpenter (Head of Design, Mechanical); Andrew Brown (Head of R&D); Jonathan Marshall (Head of Vehicle Science); William Worrall (Head of Aerodynamic Performance); Guru Johl (Chief Aerodynamicist)
- Predecessor: Force India VJM08
- Successor: Force India VJM10

Technical specifications
- Chassis: Carbon-fibre composite survival cell
- Engine: Mercedes PU106C Hybrid 1.6 L (98 cu in) direct injection V6 turbocharged engine, limited to 15,000 rpm in a mid-mounted, rear-wheel drive layout
- Electric motor: Mercedes PU106C Hybrid Motor Generator Unit–Kinetic (MGU-K) Mercedes PU106C Hybrid Motor Generator Unit–Heat (MGU-H)
- Transmission: Sequential shift gearbox with eight forward and one reverse gears
- Battery: Lithium-ion batteries
- Brakes: Carbon discs with steel calipers
- Tyres: Pirelli P Zero (dry) tyres Pirelli Cinturato (wet) tyres

Competition history
- Notable entrants: Sahara Force India
- Notable drivers: 11. (Mexico) Sergio Pérez; 27. (Germany) Nico Hülkenberg
- Debut: 2016 Australian Grand Prix
- Last event: 2016 Abu Dhabi Grand Prix
Races	Wins	Podiums	Poles	F/Laps
21	0	2	0	1

The Force India VJM09 is a Formula One racing car designed by Force India to compete in the 2016 Formula One season. The car was driven by Le Mans winner Nico Hülkenberg and Sergio Pérez, and used the Mercedes PU106C Hybrid power unit.

== Season summary ==
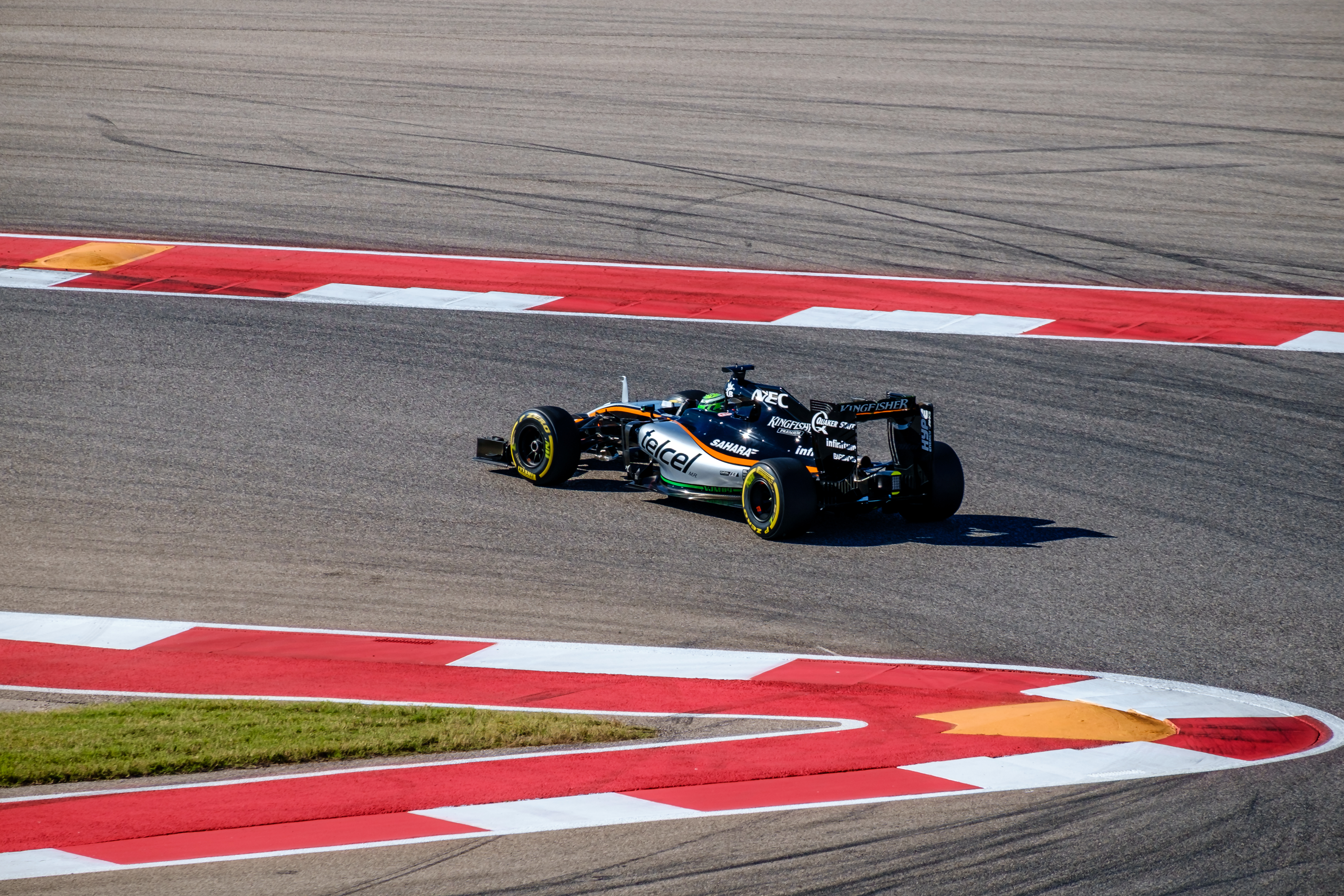
Hülkenberg at the United States Grand Prix

The VJM09 scored a notable podium at the Monaco Grand Prix where Pérez finished third and Hülkenberg sixth. It was the first time the team had scored a podium at Monaco in any guise (i.e. Jordan, Midland, Spyker or Force India). Pérez finished third again two races later in Baku at the European Grand Prix. At the Belgian Grand Prix the team managed to get their first double-finish within the top-five since the 2014 Bahrain Grand Prix with Hülkenberg finishing fourth and Pérez finishing in fifth. As a result, the team took fourth place in the Constructors' Championship from Williams, their highest ever finishing position in the team's history.

== Complete Formula One results ==
(key) (results in bold indicate pole position; results in italics indicate fastest lap)

Year	Entrant	Engine	Tyres	Drivers	Grands Prix																					Points	WCC
Year	Entrant	Engine	Tyres	Drivers	AUS	BHR	CHN	RUS	ESP	MON	CAN	EUR	AUT	GBR	HUN	GER	BEL	ITA	SIN	MAL	JPN	USA	MEX	BRA	ABU	Points	WCC
2016	Sahara; Force India	Mercedes; PU106C; Hybrid	**P**	Sergio Pérez	13	16	11	9	7	3	10	3	17†	6	11	10	5	8	8	6	7	8	10	4	8	**173**	**4th**
2016	Sahara; Force India	Mercedes; PU106C; Hybrid	**P**	Nico Hülkenberg	7	15	15	Ret	Ret	6	8	9	19†	7	10	7	4	10	Ret	8	8	Ret	7	7	7	**173**	**4th**

† Driver failed to finish the race, but was classified as they had completed greater than 90% of the race distance.
