= 2017 Canadian Grand Prix =

Race 7 of 20 in the 2017 Formula One World Championship
| ← Previous race | Next race → |
- Layout of the Circuit Gilles Villeneuve

Race details
- Date: 11 June 2017
- Official name: Formula 1 Grand Prix du Canada 2017
- Location: Circuit Gilles Villeneuve; Montreal, Quebec, Canada
- Course: Street circuit
- Course length: 4.361 km (2.710 miles)
- Distance: 70 laps, 305.270 km (189.686 miles)
- Weather: Sunny and hot with temperatures reaching up to 29 °C (84 °F); wind speeds reaching 12.9 kilometres per hour (8.0 mph)
- Attendance: 360,000

Pole position
| Driver | (United Kingdom) Lewis Hamilton | Mercedes |
- Time: 1:11.459

Fastest lap
| Driver | (United Kingdom) Lewis Hamilton | Mercedes |
- Time: 1:14.551 on lap 64

Podium
| First | (United Kingdom) Lewis Hamilton | Mercedes |
| Second | (Finland) Valtteri Bottas | Mercedes |
| Third | (Australia) Daniel Ricciardo | Red Bull Racing-TAG Heuer |

The 2017 Canadian Grand Prix (formally known as the Formula 1 Grand Prix du Canada 2017) was a Formula One motor race that took place on 11 June 2017 at the Circuit Gilles Villeneuve in Montreal, Quebec, Canada. The race was the seventh round of the 2017 FIA Formula One World Championship. It was the fifty-fourth running of the Canadian Grand Prix, and the forty-eighth time the event had been included as a round of the Formula One World Championship since the inception of the series in 1950, and the thirty-eighth time that a World Championship round had been held at Circuit Gilles Villeneuve.

The race was won by Mercedes driver Lewis Hamilton who took pole, led every lap of the race and set the fastest lap. His teammate Valtteri Bottas finished second to allow Mercedes earn their first 1-2 finish of the season. Daniel Ricciardo, driving for Red Bull, finished the race in 3rd place to complete the podium positions. Mercedes dominated the weekend after a bad weekend at Monaco. Lance Stroll finished in 9th place, earning him his first career points in F1 and became the first Canadian Formula One driver to score a point since Jacques Villeneuve in the 2006 British Grand Prix.

== Report ==
=== Background ===
Fernando Alonso returned to racing for McLaren, after missing the previous round in Monaco to participate in the Indianapolis 500.

Tyre supplier Pirelli made the soft, supersoft and ultrasoft tyres available to teams for the race.

=== Free practice ===
Mercedes' Lewis Hamilton went fastest in first practice, setting a time of 1.13:809. He was followed by the Ferrari of Sebastian Vettel and his teammate Valtteri Bottas in second and third. Fernando Alonso's McLaren continued to suffer from reliability issues as he broke down and retired from the session. In second practice the Ferrari of Kimi Räikkönen was fastest followed by Hamilton and Vettel. Saturday's third and final practice was topped by Vettel, with Raikkonen second and Hamilton third. Vettel set the quickest time of all three practices with a 1.12:572.

=== Qualifying ===
Q1 ended with Pascal Wehrlein crashing his Sauber at turn one after touching the grass border of the track. Damage sustained in the accident meant he would start the race from the pit lane.

In Q3 Lewis Hamilton secured pole position with a 1:11.459 matching Ayrton Senna's second all-time highest pole record, 0.330 seconds quicker than Ferrari's Vettel in second. Third spot on the grid went to Valtteri Bottas with Raikkonen and Verstappen starting fourth and fifth.

=== Race ===
At the start, Max Verstappen advanced three positions to head into turn two right behind Hamilton who was in the lead. Third and fourth were Bottas and Vettel, the latter had sustained slight front wing damage from contact with Verstappen heading into turn 2. Daniel Ricciardo moved into 5th when he passed Kimi Räikkönen on the first lap. Räikkönen would eventually finish 7th after falling behind the Force Indias and struggling with brake problems in the late stages of the race. Also on the first lap, an incident occurred causing the retirement of Carlos Sainz and Felipe Massa, and a pit stop front wing change for Romain Grosjean. The safety car was brought out to allow marshals to clear the track. At the restart Vettel's damaged wing partially collapsed as he accelerated back to racing speed. He pitted on lap 5 to repair the damage and dropped to 18th (last) position. On lap 11, Verstappen's Red Bull lost electrical power and forced his retirement from 2nd position. As the race continued, Canadian Lance Stroll worked his way up into 9th position for what would be his first points in F1. On lap 66 Fernando Alonso's McLaren suffered an engine failure preventing him from scoring his team's first points of the season. Hamilton finished the race 20 seconds ahead of teammate Bottas with Ricciardo in third. Sebastian Vettel overtook Sergio Pérez on the penultimate lap to finish in 4th position close behind Ricciardo, following a race-long charge from the back and an alternate two-stop strategy. Earlier Pérez had ignored requests from his team to allow his faster teammate Esteban Ocon past in order to challenge Ricciardo for the last podium place.

== Classification ==
=== Qualifying ===
| Pos. | Car no. | Driver | Constructor | Qualifying times | | | Final grid |
| Pos. | Car no. | Driver | Constructor | Q1 | Q2 | Q3 | Final grid |
|---|---|---|---|---|---|---|---|
| 1 | 44 | (United Kingdom) Lewis Hamilton | Mercedes | 1:12.692 | 1:12.496 | 1:11.459 | 1 |
| 2 | 5 | (Germany) Sebastian Vettel | Ferrari | 1:13.046 | 1:12.749 | 1:11.789 | 2 |
| 3 | 77 | (Finland) Valtteri Bottas | Mercedes | 1:12.685 | 1:12.563 | 1:12.177 | 3 |
| 4 | 7 | (Finland) Kimi Räikkönen | Ferrari | 1:13.548 | 1:12.580 | 1:12.252 | 4 |
| 5 | 33 | (Netherlands) Max Verstappen | Red Bull Racing-TAG Heuer | 1:13.177 | 1:12.751 | 1:12.403 | 5 |
| 6 | 3 | (Australia) Daniel Ricciardo | Red Bull Racing-TAG Heuer | 1:13.543 | 1:12.810 | 1:12.557 | 6 |
| 7 | 19 | (Brazil) Felipe Massa | Williams-Mercedes | 1:13.435 | 1:13.012 | 1:12.858 | 7 |
| 8 | 11 | (Mexico) Sergio Pérez | Force India-Mercedes | 1:13.470 | 1:13.262 | 1:13.018 | 8 |
| 9 | 31 | (France) Esteban Ocon | Force India-Mercedes | 1:13.520 | 1:13.320 | 1:13.135 | 9 |
| 10 | 27 | (Germany) Nico Hülkenberg | Renault | 1:13.804 | 1:13.406 | 1:13.271 | 10 |
| 11 | 26 | (Russia) Daniil Kvyat | Toro Rosso | 1:13.802 | 1:13.690 | | 11 |
| 12 | 14 | (Spain) Fernando Alonso | McLaren-Honda | 1:13.669 | 1:13.693 | | 12 |
| 13 | 55 | (Spain) Carlos Sainz Jr. | Toro Rosso | 1:14.051 | 1:13.756 | | 13 |
| 14 | 8 | (France) Romain Grosjean | Haas-Ferrari | 1:13.780 | 1:13.839 | | 14 |
| 15 | 30 | (United Kingdom) Jolyon Palmer | Renault | 1:13.990 | 1:14.293 | | 15 |
| 16 | 2 | (Belgium) Stoffel Vandoorne | McLaren-Honda | 1:14.182 | | | 16 |
| 17 | 18 | (Canada) Lance Stroll | Williams-Mercedes | 1:14.209 | | | 17 |
| 18 | 20 | (Denmark) Kevin Magnussen | Haas-Ferrari | 1:14.318 | | | 18 |
| 19 | 9 | (Sweden) Marcus Ericsson | Sauber-Ferrari | 1:14.495 | | | 19 |
| 20 | 94 | (Germany) Pascal Wehrlein | Sauber-Ferrari | 1:14.810 | | | PL^{1} |
107% time: 1:17.772

Notes

- ^1 – Pascal Wehrlein penalised five grid places for an unscheduled gearbox change and required to start from the pit lane for changing to a new specification of rear wing assembly.

=== Race ===
| Pos. | No. | Driver | Constructor | Laps | Time/Retired | Grid | Points |
|---|---|---|---|---|---|---|---|
| 1 | 44 | (United Kingdom) Lewis Hamilton | Mercedes | 70 | 1:33:05.154 | 1 | 25 |
| 2 | 77 | (Finland) Valtteri Bottas | Mercedes | 70 | +19.783 | 3 | 18 |
| 3 | 3 | (Australia) Daniel Ricciardo | Red Bull Racing-TAG Heuer | 70 | +35.297 | 6 | 15 |
| 4 | 5 | (Germany) Sebastian Vettel | Ferrari | 70 | +35.907 | 2 | 12 |
| 5 | 11 | (Mexico) Sergio Pérez | Force India-Mercedes | 70 | +40.476 | 8 | 10 |
| 6 | 31 | (France) Esteban Ocon | Force India-Mercedes | 70 | +40.716 | 9 | 8 |
| 7 | 7 | (Finland) Kimi Räikkönen | Ferrari | 70 | +58.632 | 4 | 6 |
| 8 | 27 | (Germany) Nico Hülkenberg | Renault | 70 | +1:00.374 | 10 | 4 |
| 9 | 18 | (Canada) Lance Stroll | Williams-Mercedes | 69 | +1 Lap | 17 | 2 |
| 10 | 8 | (France) Romain Grosjean | Haas-Ferrari | 69 | +1 Lap | 14 | 1 |
| 11 | 30 | (United Kingdom) Jolyon Palmer | Renault | 69 | +1 Lap | 15 | |
| 12 | 20 | (Denmark) Kevin Magnussen | Haas-Ferrari | 69 | +1 Lap | 18 | |
| 13 | 9 | (Sweden) Marcus Ericsson | Sauber-Ferrari | 69 | +1 Lap | 19 | |
| 14 | 2 | (Belgium) Stoffel Vandoorne | McLaren-Honda | 69 | +1 Lap | 16 | |
| 15 | 94 | (Germany) Pascal Wehrlein | Sauber-Ferrari | 68 | +2 Laps | PL | |
| 16^{1} | 14 | (Spain) Fernando Alonso | McLaren-Honda | 66 | Power unit | 12 | |
| Ret | 26 | (Russia) Daniil Kvyat | Toro Rosso | 54 | Power unit | 11 | |
| Ret | 33 | (Netherlands) Max Verstappen | Red Bull Racing-TAG Heuer | 10 | Electrical | 5 | |
| Ret | 19 | (Brazil) Felipe Massa | Williams-Mercedes | 0 | Collision | 7 | |
| Ret | 55 | (Spain) Carlos Sainz Jr. | Toro Rosso | 0 | Collision | 13 | |

Notes

- ^1 – Fernando Alonso was classified as he had completed 90% of the winner's race distance.

== Championship standings after the race ==
Drivers' Championship standings

| Pos. | Driver | Points |
|---|---|---|
| 1 | (Germany) Sebastian Vettel | 141 |
| 2 | (United Kingdom) Lewis Hamilton | 129 |
| 3 | (Finland) Valtteri Bottas | 93 |
| 4 | (Finland) Kimi Räikkönen | 73 |
| 5 | (Australia) Daniel Ricciardo | 67 |

Constructors' Championship standings

| | Pos. | Constructor | Points |
|---|---|---|---|
| 1 | 1 | (Germany) Mercedes | 222 |
| 1 | 2 | (Italy) Ferrari | 214 |
| | 3 | (Austria) Red Bull Racing-TAG Heuer | 112 |
| | 4 | Force India-Mercedes | 71 |
| | 5 | (Italy) Toro Rosso | 29 |

- Note: Only the top five positions are included for both sets of standings.

| Previous race: 2017 Monaco Grand Prix | FIA Formula One World Championship; 2017 season | Next race: 2017 Azerbaijan Grand Prix |
| Previous race: 2016 Canadian Grand Prix | Canadian Grand Prix | Next race: 2018 Canadian Grand Prix |
