= Force India VJM11 =

Formula One racing car

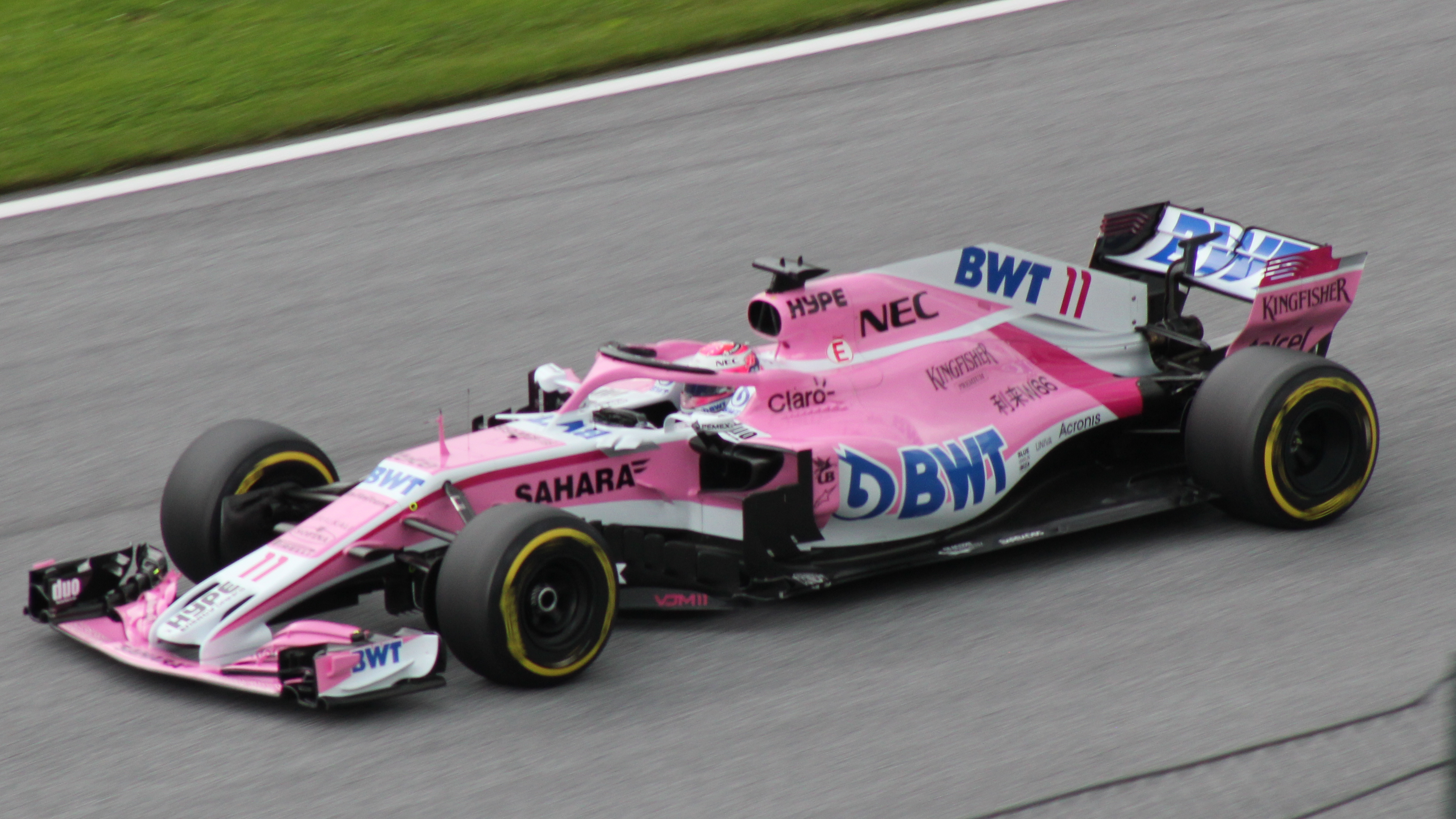
- The VJM11, driven by Sergio Pérez, during the Austrian Grand Prix
- Category: Formula One
- Constructor: Force India
- Designers: Andrew Green (Technical Director); Simon Phillips (Aerodynamics Director); Akio Haga (Chief Designer); Bruce Eddington (Head of Design, Composites); Dan Carpenter (Head of Design, Mechanical); Andrew Brown (Head of R&D); Jonathan Marshall (Head of Vehicle Science); William Worrall (Head of Aerodynamic Performance); Guru Johl (Chief Aerodynamicist)
- Predecessor: Force India VJM10
- Successor: Racing Point RP19 (as Racing Point)

Technical specifications
- Chassis: Carbon fibre composite monocoque with Zylon side anti-intrusion panels
- Suspension (front): Aluminium alloy uprights with carbon fibre composite wishbones, trackrod and pushrod
- Suspension (rear): Aluminium alloy uprights with carbon fibre composite wishbones, trackrod and pullrod
- Engine: Mercedes M09 EQ Power+ 1.6 L (98 cu in) direct injection V6 turbocharged engine limited to 15,000 RPM in a mid-mounted, rear-wheel drive layout
- Electric motor: Mercedes kinetic and thermal energy recovery systems
- Transmission: Mercedes AMG F1 eight-speed gearbox with semi-automatic seamless shift
- Fuel: Petronas Primax, Pemex
- Lubricants: Ravenol
- Brakes: Carbon Industries 920E Brake system
- Tyres: Pirelli P Zero (dry); Pirelli Cinturato (wet); BBS wheels

Competition history
- Notable entrants: Sahara Force India F1 Team (Rounds 1-12); (United Kingdom) Racing Point Force India F1 Team (Rounds 13-21)
- Notable drivers: 11. (Mexico) Sergio Pérez; 31. (France) Esteban Ocon; TD. (Canada) Nicholas Latifi
- Debut: 2018 Australian Grand Prix
- Last event: 2018 Abu Dhabi Grand Prix
Races	Wins	Podiums	Poles	F/Laps
21	0	1	0	0

The Force India VJM11 is a Formula One racing car designed and constructed by Force India to compete during the 2018 FIA Formula One World Championship. The car was driven by Sergio Pérez and Esteban Ocon, and made its competitive début at the 2018 Australian Grand Prix. Following the bankruptcy of the Force India team, the Force India assets were purchased—including the VJM11 design and built cars—by a new team, Racing Point Force India, who continued to enter the VJM11 under the Force India name.

== Season summary ==
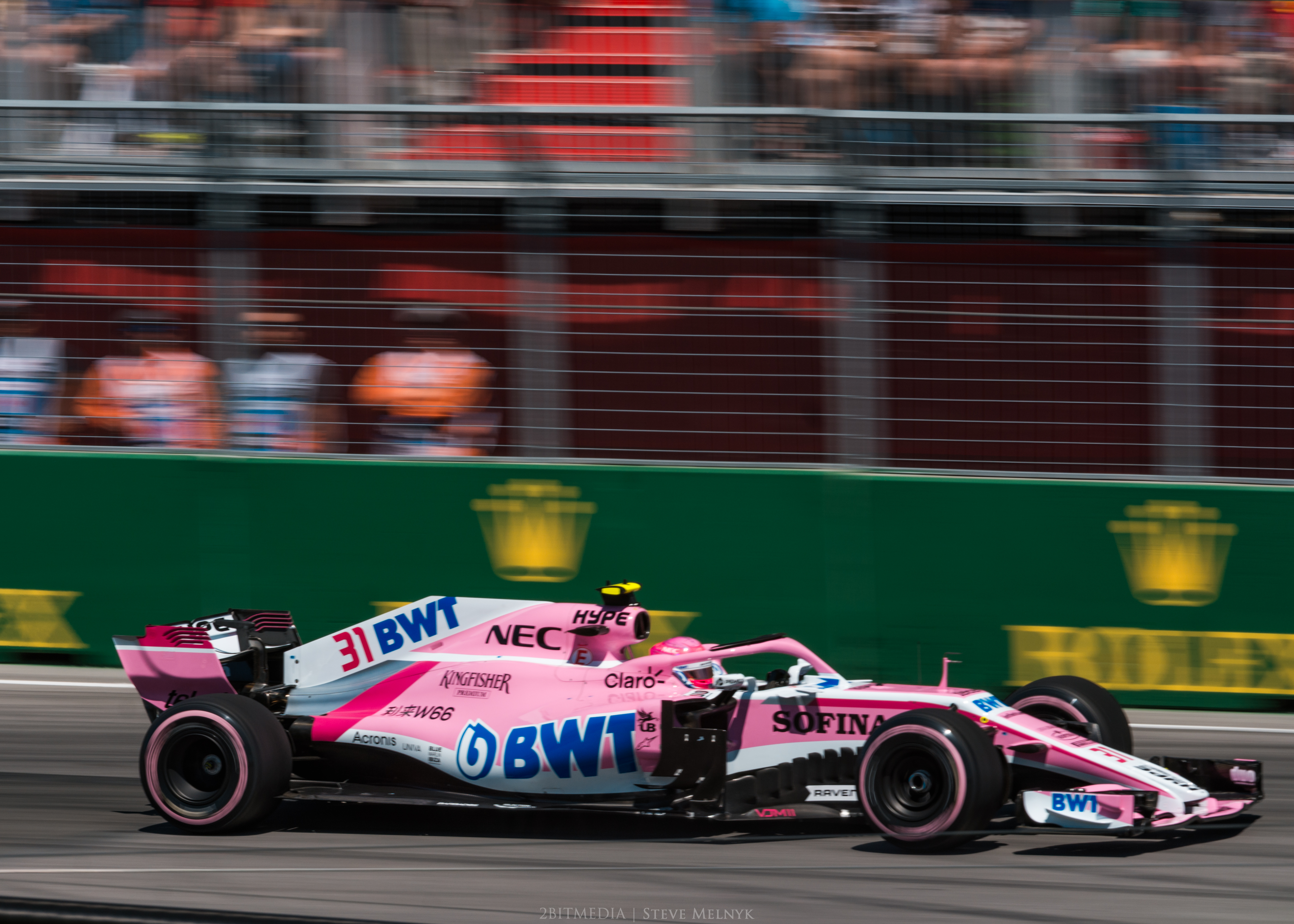
Ocon took ninth at the Canadian Grand Prix

The VJM11 originally scored 59 points up until the Belgian Grand Prix before the team's championship points were voided following the bankruptcy of Force India and the subsequent purchase by Racing Point Force India. Prior to the purchase, Pérez's best result was third at the Azerbaijan Grand Prix, while Ocon had a pair of sixth place finishes at the Monaco Grand Prix and the Austrian Grand Prix.

After the summer break, the VJM11, debuting under the Racing Point Force India banner, took a surprising third and fourth in their first qualifying with Ocon starting ahead of his teammate. Ocon ultimately finished sixth and Pérez in fifth. By the end of the season, the VJM11 accumulated 52 points and finished 7th in the constructors' championship.

== Sponsorship and livery ==
The VJM11 was painted with a white base colour and pink livery; the pink tone was brighter than previously. Despite the team being taken over by a new ownership, no changes were made to the livery itself. However, both Sahara India Pariwar and Kingfisher sponsorships were terminated starting from the Belgian Grand Prix onwards. BWT, Hype Energy, Uralkali and Sofina were retained until the end of the season.

== Complete Formula One results ==
(key) (results in bold indicate pole position; results in italics indicate fastest lap)

Year	Entrant	Engine	Tyres	Drivers	Grands Prix																					Points	WCC
Year	Entrant	Engine	Tyres	Drivers	AUS	BHR	CHN	AZE	ESP	MON	CAN	FRA	AUT	GBR	GER	HUN	BEL	ITA	SIN	RUS	JPN	USA	MEX	BRA	ABU	Points	WCC
2018	Sahara Force India F1 Team	Mercedes	P																								
2018	Sahara Force India F1 Team	Mercedes	P	Ocon	12	10	11	Ret	Ret	6	9	Ret	6	7	8	13										0 (Note: Sahara Force India F1 Team drivers scored 59 points prior the constructor points were voided)	EX
2018	Sahara Force India F1 Team	Mercedes	P	Pérez	11	16	12	3	9	12	14	Ret	7	10	7	14										0	EX
2018	Sahara Force India F1 Team	Mercedes	P	Latifi							TD				TD											0	EX
2018	Racing Point Force India F1 Team	Mercedes	P	Ocon													6	6	Ret	9	9	DSQ	11	14	Ret	52	7th
2018	Racing Point Force India F1 Team	Mercedes	P	Pérez													5	7	16	10	7	8	Ret	10	8	52	7th
2018	Racing Point Force India F1 Team	Mercedes	P	Latifi																TD		TD	TD	TD		52	7th
