= Force India =

Former Indian Formula One racing team

Coordinates: 52°04′33″N 1°01′46″W

- Full name: Force India; Formula One Team (2008–2011); Sahara Force India; Formula One Team (2012–2018)
- Base: Silverstone, United Kingdom
- Founder(s): Vijay Mallya & Michiel Mol
- Noted staff: Steve Curnow; Bob Fernley; Mike Gascoyne; Andrew Green; James Key; Colin Kolles; Subrata Roy; Otmar Szafnauer
- Noted drivers: (Mexico) Sergio Pérez (France) Esteban Ocon (Italy) Giancarlo Fisichella (Germany) Nico Hülkenberg (Italy) Vitantonio Liuzzi (United Kingdom) Paul di Resta (Germany) Adrian Sutil
- Previous name: Spyker F1 Team
- Next name: Racing Point Force India

Formula One World Championship career
- First entry: 2008 Australian Grand Prix
- Races entered: 203
- Engines: Ferrari, Mercedes
- Constructors' Championships: 0 (best finish: 4th, 2016 and 2017)
- Drivers' Championships: 0
- Race victories: 0 (best finish: 2nd, 2009 Belgian Grand Prix)
- Podiums: 6
- Points: 987
- Pole positions: 1
- Fastest laps: 5
- Final entry: 2018 Hungarian Grand Prix

Force India Formula One Team Limited, commonly known as Force India and later Sahara Force India, was a Formula One racing team and constructor based in Silverstone, United Kingdom, with an Indian licence. The team was formed in October 2007 when a consortium led by Indian businessman Vijay Mallya and Dutch businessman Michiel Mol bought the Spyker F1 team for €88 million.

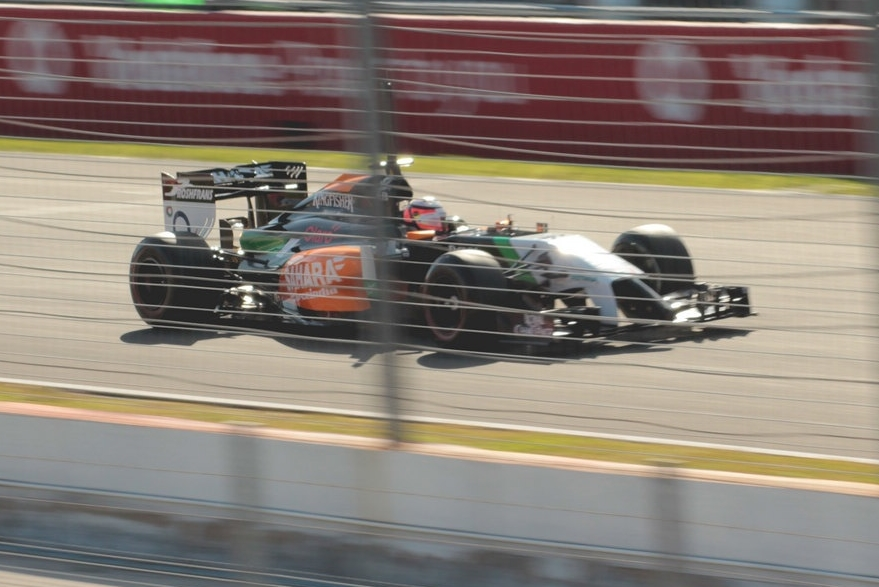
Force India VJM07 at pre-season test in Jerez

After going through 29 races without scoring points, Force India won their first Formula One world championship points and podium place when Giancarlo Fisichella finished second in the 2009 Belgian Grand Prix. Force India scored points again in the following race when Adrian Sutil finished fourth, and set the team's first fastest lap, at the Italian Grand Prix. The team's other podium finishes are five third-places, in the 2014 Bahrain Grand Prix, 2015 Russian Grand Prix, 2016 Monaco Grand Prix, 2016 European Grand Prix and the 2018 Azerbaijan Grand Prix, all achieved by Sergio Pérez.

In October 2011, Indian company Sahara India Pariwar, purchased 42.5% of Force India F1's shares at US$100 million.

In 2018, Vijay Mallya, accused of fraud and defaulting on loans, could not afford to continue to run Force India. By July 2018, ahead of the Hungarian Grand Prix, the team announced that they had been put into administration by the High Court in London. The team's assets were bought by a consortium of investors, named Racing Point UK, led by Lawrence Stroll, the father of then Williams driver Lance Stroll. The consortium used the assets to create a new entry into the sport named Racing Point Force India. The constructor that had been founded in 2008 ceased to exist prior to the 2019 Australian Grand Prix when the new team changed their constructor entry to "Racing Point".

== History ==
=== Background ===
The team's origins stemmed from the Jordan Grand Prix team, which entered Formula One racing in 1991 based at the Silverstone circuit. Jordan enjoyed many years in Formula One, winning four races and achieving third place in the 1999 Constructors' Championship. However, like many of the smaller teams in the 2000s, financial problems meant the team's performance dried up, and team owner Eddie Jordan sold the team to the Midland Group in early 2005.

The Midland owned team renamed Midland F1 Racing in 2006 spent two seasons at the back of grid, before owner Alex Shnaider sold the team to Spyker Cars midway through the 2006 season.

Spyker F1 scored a point in 2007 and briefly led the European Grand Prix; despite this, the team once again hit financing issues, and was sold on to Indian businessman Vijay Mallya, then chairman of the United Breweries Group and Michiel Mol, Spyker's Formula One Director. The team, bought for €88 million, was renamed as the Force India Formula One Team for the 2008 season, and retained team principal Colin Kolles, Chief Technology Officer Mike Gascoyne, and drivers were Adrian Sutil and Giancarlo Fisichella.

=== 2008 season ===
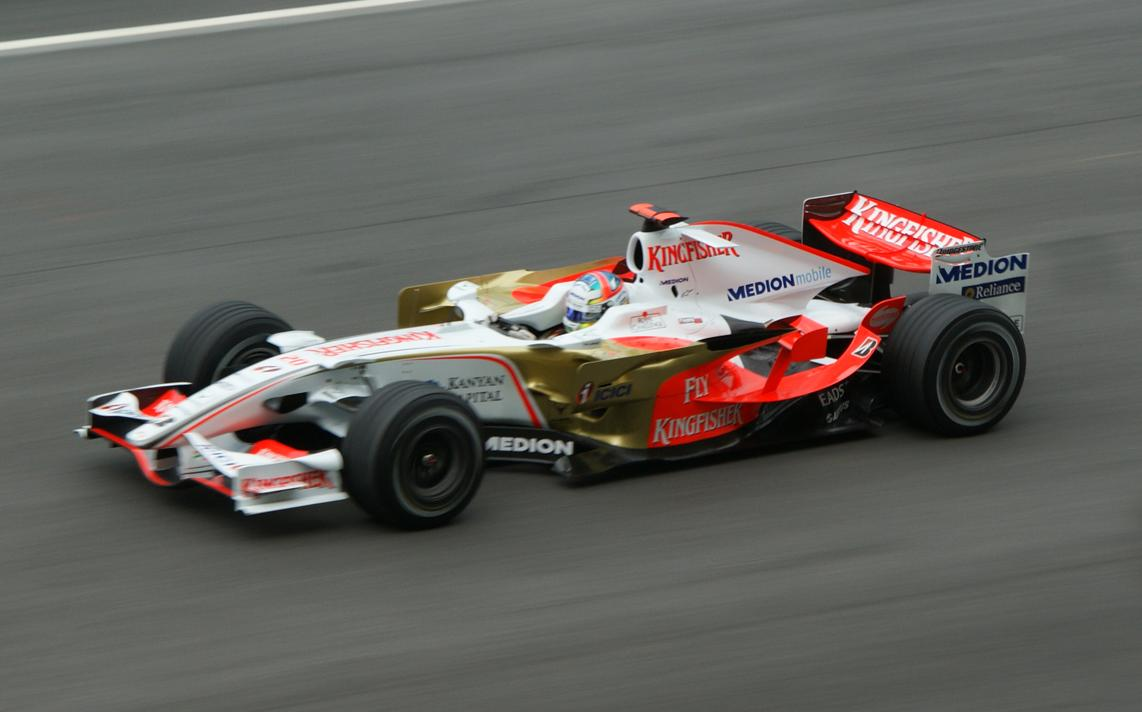
Adrian Sutil driving for Force India at the 2008 Malaysian Grand Prix.

After retaining Adrian Sutil for the team's first season, Force India conducted winter tests for the second driver and testing roles. Ex-Renault driver Giancarlo Fisichella was chosen for the race seat, and Vitantonio Liuzzi secured the reserve role; they were to drive an updated version of the Spyker F8-VIIB chassis with Ferrari engines, christened the Force India VJM01. Testing of the car begun in February, after the gold, tungsten and white liveried car was launched at the Gateway of India in Mumbai. With an increased budget and wind tunnels from defence company EADS, the team set itself the target of beating Super Aguri, a squad which spent the previous seasons contesting at the back with Force India's predecessors.

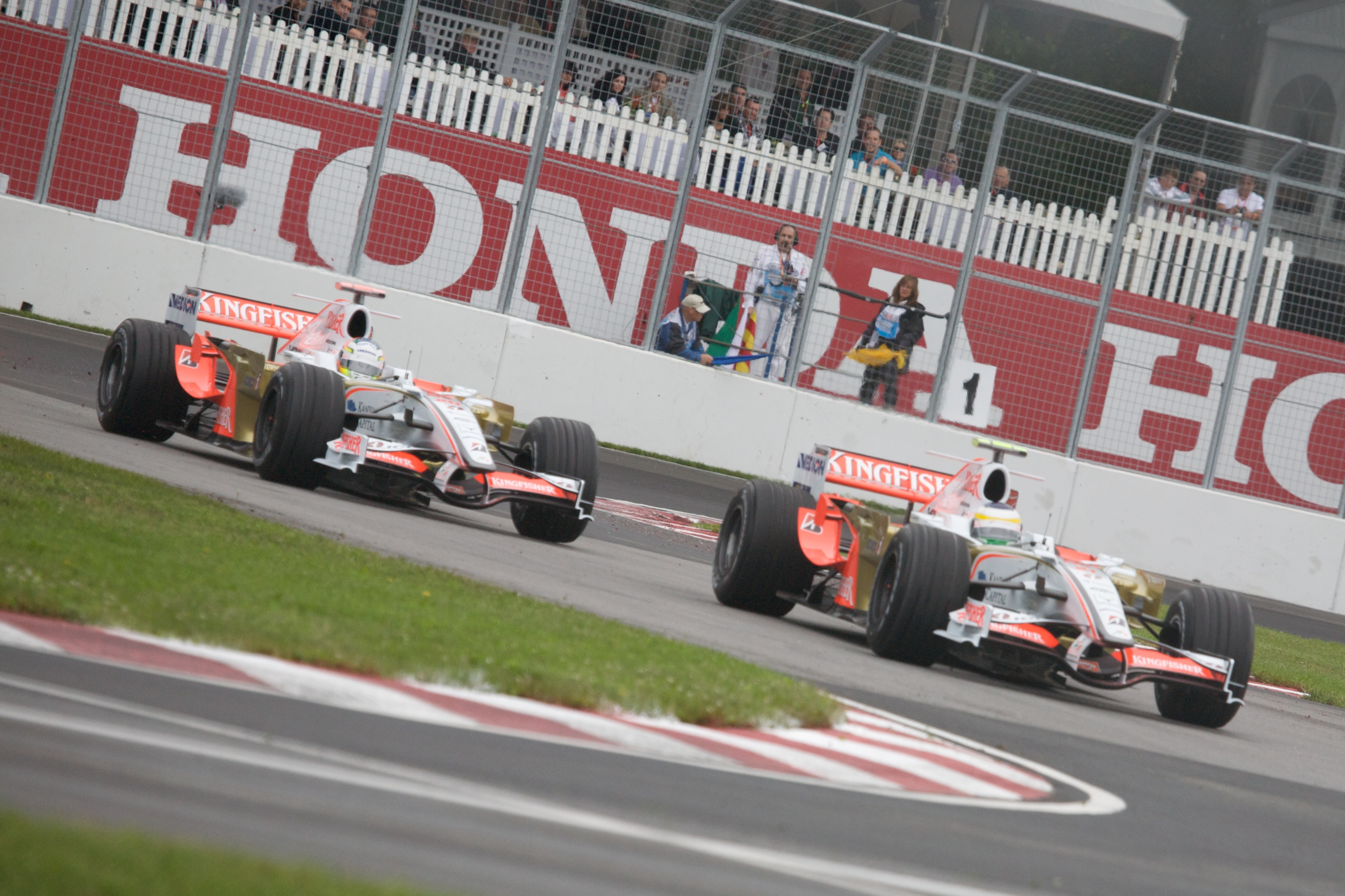
Giancarlo Fisichella leads Adrian Sutil at the 2008 Canadian Grand Prix.

Melbourne was the scene of Force India's first race, and although the Australian Grand Prix gave the team a poor start with both drivers retiring in the first few laps, the following race in Malaysia saw Fisichella's twelfth place earn the team's first finish. After disappointing results in the opening races, Sutil gave the team the chance to score its first points in the wet Monaco Grand Prix, but towards the end of the race Kimi Räikkönen's Ferrari lost control and hit Sutil's car causing immediate retirement. Although a furious Gascoyne called for Räikkönen to be penalised, overtakes under yellow flag conditions would have meant Sutil receiving a time penalty post-race, dropping him out of points. Continuous updates to improve reliability and performance allowed the team to close the gap to the fastest teams during the mid-season, despite Super Aguri's withdrawal meaning the two cars started from the rear of the grid for the majority of races. A seamless-shift transmission introduced at Valencia marked the end of development for the car; team owner Mallya had realised underinvestment and continued changes of ownership had led the team to fall behind. Force India had been focusing on 2009 since Mallya brought the team, believing that the new regulations would yield better results. Despite halting work on the VJM01, Fisichella put his car to a season-best 12th on the grid at the Italian Grand Prix during an extremely wet qualifying session; he was however to crash out during the race. Fisichella continued his good form by reaching second during the Singapore round and fifth at the season-ending Brazilian Grand Prix; a safety car before his pit stop prevented points in Singapore, while transmission issues in Brazil left him 18th and two laps down. Force India finished the season tenth place in the Constructors' Championship, and Fisichella achieved the best finish of tenth at the Spanish Grand Prix.

=== 2009 season ===
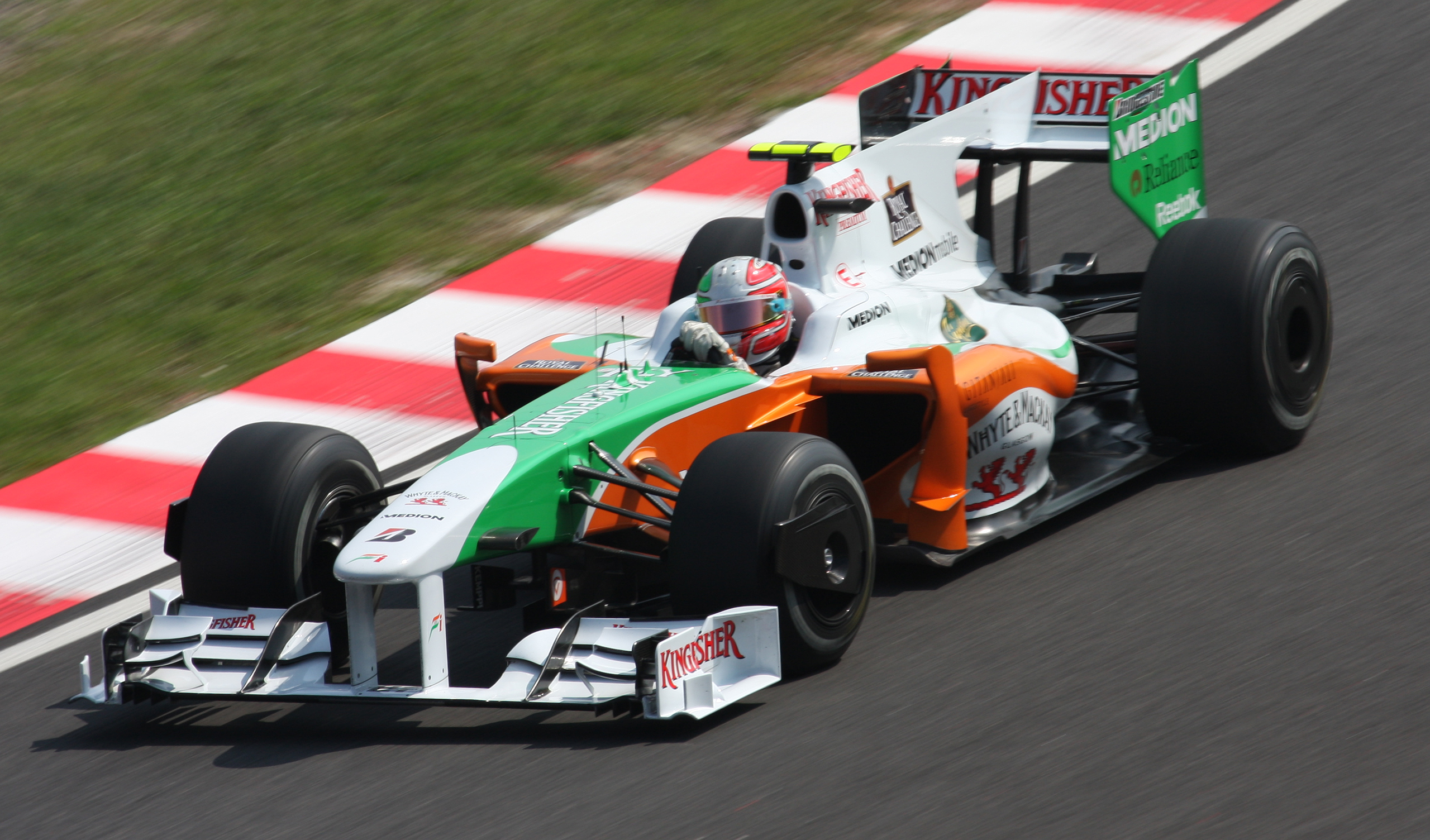
Vitantonio Liuzzi driving for Force India at the 2009 Japanese Grand Prix.

Force India retained the same drivers for the 2009 season. The VJM02 was powered by Mercedes-Benz engines, after the team signed a five-year deal on 10 November 2008. The deal also included a supply of McLaren-Mercedes gearboxes, hydraulic systems and the KERS feature. The car was revealed on 1 March 2009.

At the wet Chinese Grand Prix, Sutil almost secured Force India's first points, holding sixth place in front of Lewis Hamilton and Timo Glock with six laps remaining when aquaplaning led to the Force India car skidding off the road and crashing out of the race. At the German Grand Prix, Sutil qualified in seventh place and battled for the points, reaching second at one point, before colliding with Kimi Räikkönen after exiting the pit lane and being forced to pit again to change a broken front wing. He finished 15th.

Force India gained their first pole position in Formula One at the Belgian Grand Prix in Spa-Francorchamps, when Fisichella qualified fastest. He finished the race in second position, less than a second behind Kimi Räikkönen earning Force India's first ever points and podium position. Missing the win was partially blamed on the car's lack of KERS, a system present on the Ferrari.

On 3 September 2009, Force India announced that they were releasing Fisichella from his contract to allow him to race for Ferrari for the remainder of the season. It was announced four days later that test driver Vitantonio Liuzzi would replace Fisichella for the remaining races.

In qualifying for the Italian Grand Prix at Monza, Sutil qualified second and Liuzzi, on his race debut for the team, qualified seventh. On race day, Sutil finished fourth and clocked the fastest lap of the race. While running fourth in the race, Liuzzi had to retire due to a transmission failure. Force India finished the season ninth in front of Scuderia Toro Rosso with 13 points, however, this did not reflect the vast improvement Force India had made from the start of the season.

=== 2010 season ===
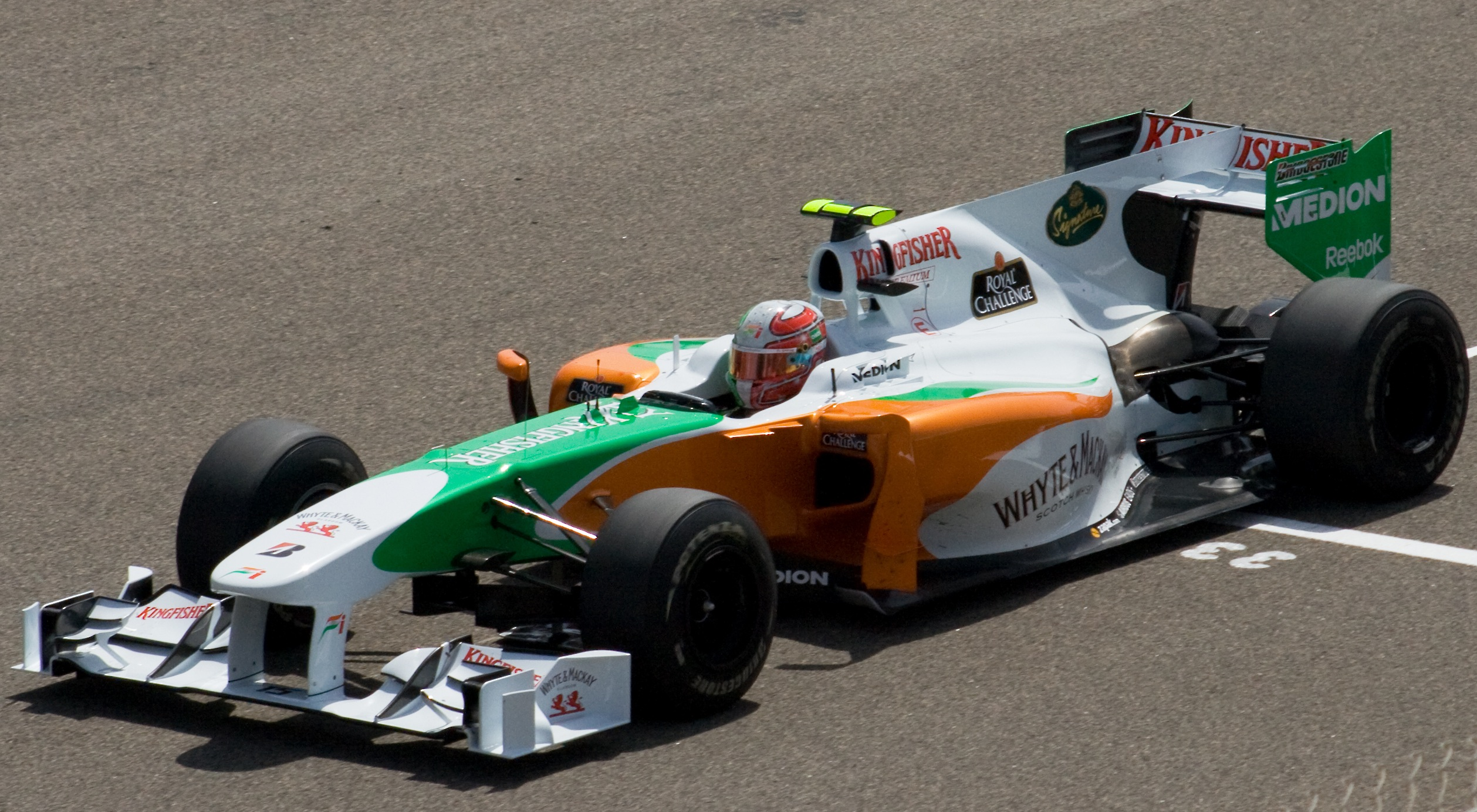
Vitantonio Liuzzi driving for Force India at the 2010 Bahrain Grand Prix.

The team announced on 27 November 2009, that it was to keep Adrian Sutil and Vitantonio Liuzzi for the 2010 season. The team tested Paul di Resta and J. R. Hildebrand at Jerez, with di Resta setting a much faster time. Di Resta was confirmed as the team's test driver on 2 February 2010. On 9 February 2010, Force India unveiled their new car, the VJM03, which was to be used in the 2010 season.

The 2010 season began with points in Bahrain, with Liuzzi finishing in ninth position. Sutil had qualified in tenth, but was involved in a first-lap incident with the Renault of Robert Kubica. He ultimately recovered to finish in twelfth position. In Australia, Sutil again qualified in the top ten, with Liuzzi qualifying thirteenth. Liuzzi finished the race in seventh, while Sutil retired with an engine problem. In Malaysia Sutil scored ten points with fifth and Liuzzi retired early due to a throttle problem, his first retirement of the season. In the next few races, apart from a retirement from Liuzzi, the Force Indias had quiet races in the midfield, staying mainly out of the action in front of and behind them, with Sutil scoring points in Spain. At Monaco both cars finished the race in eighth and ninth, avoiding the numerous incidents, giving the team their first double points finish. In Turkey, Sutil finished 9th scoring two points, while Liuzzi finished 13th. At the following race in Montreal, both cars finished in the points, with Liuzzi finishing 9th and Sutil in 10th.

A number of senior personnel left the team during the season, with technical director James Key being the highest-profile member, leaving to join Sauber in a similar role. Chief designer Lewis Butler, senior aerodynamicist Marianne Hinson, and commercial director Ian Phillips also left the outfit.

Force India finished the season in seventh place with 68 points, ahead of Sauber, but a point behind Williams.

=== 2011 season ===
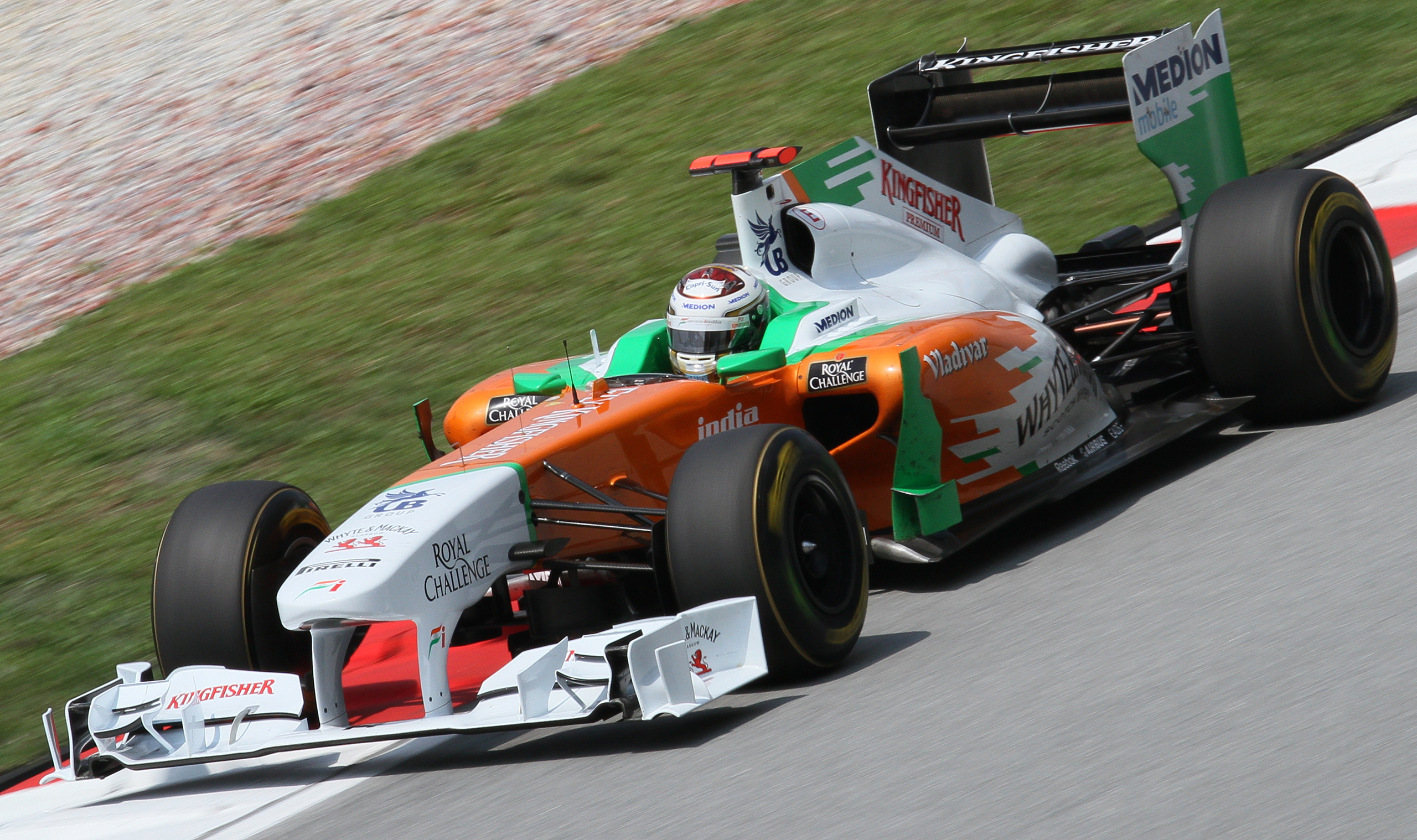
Adrian Sutil driving for Force India at the 2011 Malaysian Grand Prix.

On 26 January 2011, the team announced that reserve driver Paul di Resta would be promoted to a race seat for the 2011 season, to partner Adrian Sutil. The team launched their new car, the VJM04 on 8 February 2011 via an online launch. The VJM04 is the first car created under new technical director Andrew Green and developed using the resources from partners McLaren Applied Technologies and Mercedes-Benz HighPerformanceEngines. In the first race of the year in Australia, Sutil and di Resta finished the race in eleventh and twelfth places respectively but were later promoted to ninth and tenth after both Sauber cars were disqualified for a technical infringement relating to the rear wing of both their cars.

Di Resta scored more points in Malaysia but he had to retire in Turkey. Sutil finished seventh in Monaco, and ninth in Valencia. Di Resta was bound for points in Britain before a collision with Buemi, while Sutil finished sixth in Germany ahead of the Mercedes cars. Di Resta finished seventh in Hungary, eighth in Italy and took his best race result of sixth in Singapore, while Sutil added a seventh-place finish in Belgium and an eighth in Singapore. Di Resta scored another point in Korea, while at the Airtel Indian Grand Prix, Sutil scored two points with ninth place. At the final race in Brazil, Sutil matched his best finish of the season with sixth place, while di Resta finished eighth, to help the team finish sixth in the Constructors' Championship, four points in arrears of fifth-placed Renault.

=== 2012 season ===
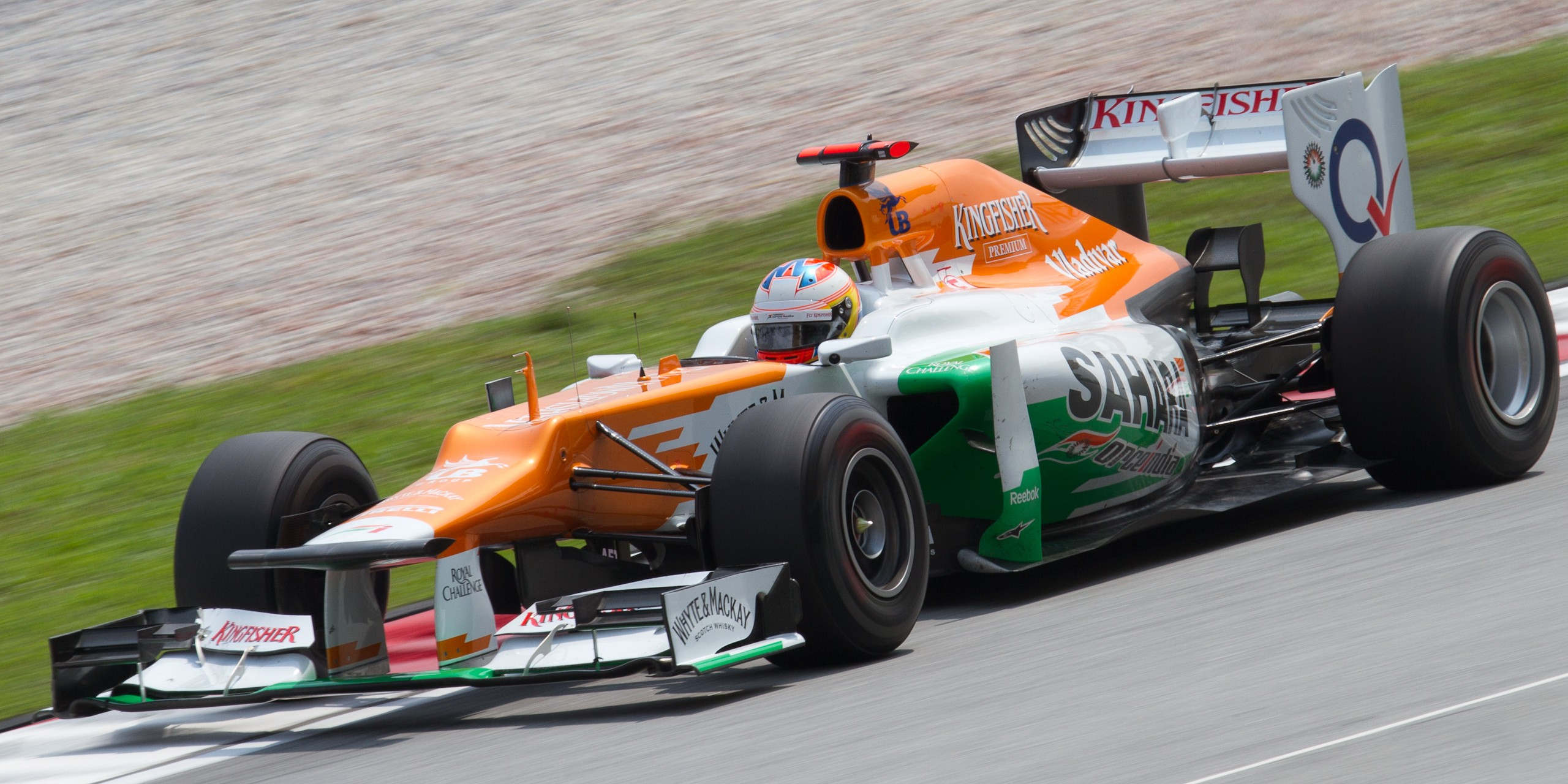
Paul di Resta driving for Force India at the 2012 Malaysian Grand Prix.

For their 2012 line-up, the team retained Paul di Resta and replaced Adrian Sutil with their 2011 reserve driver, Nico Hülkenberg. Jules Bianchi was later named as the team's reserve driver, and will also take part in Friday practice for the team during the season. The team's car, the VJM05, was launched at Silverstone on 3 February.

The Force India crew tried to pull out of the 2012 Bahrain Grand Prix due to a revolution against the regime and the death of a protester. However, after the team's refusal to take to the circuit, there was a confrontation between F1 chief Bernie Ecclestone and the Force India team.

In the last race of the season, the 2012 Brazilian Grand Prix, Hülkenberg qualified 7th but was promoted to 6th after Pastor Maldonado received a 10 place grid penalty. By lap three he had moved forward two places and on lap five he passed Fernando Alonso for third place. He moved into second position when McLaren's Lewis Hamilton pitted on lap 11. Hülkenberg then passed Jenson Button at the start of lap 19 to take the lead. He and Button built up a 45-second lead before the safety car was deployed because of debris on the track. He still led until he was passed by Hamilton, after sliding at the entry of Turn 8 on lap 49. On lap 55 he collided with Hamilton when the rear of Hülkenberg's car slid out while trying to pass him at Turn 1. After being given a drive-through penalty as a result of the incident, Hülkenberg finished fifth.

Force India finished their 2012 campaign in seventh place with 109 points.

=== 2013 season ===
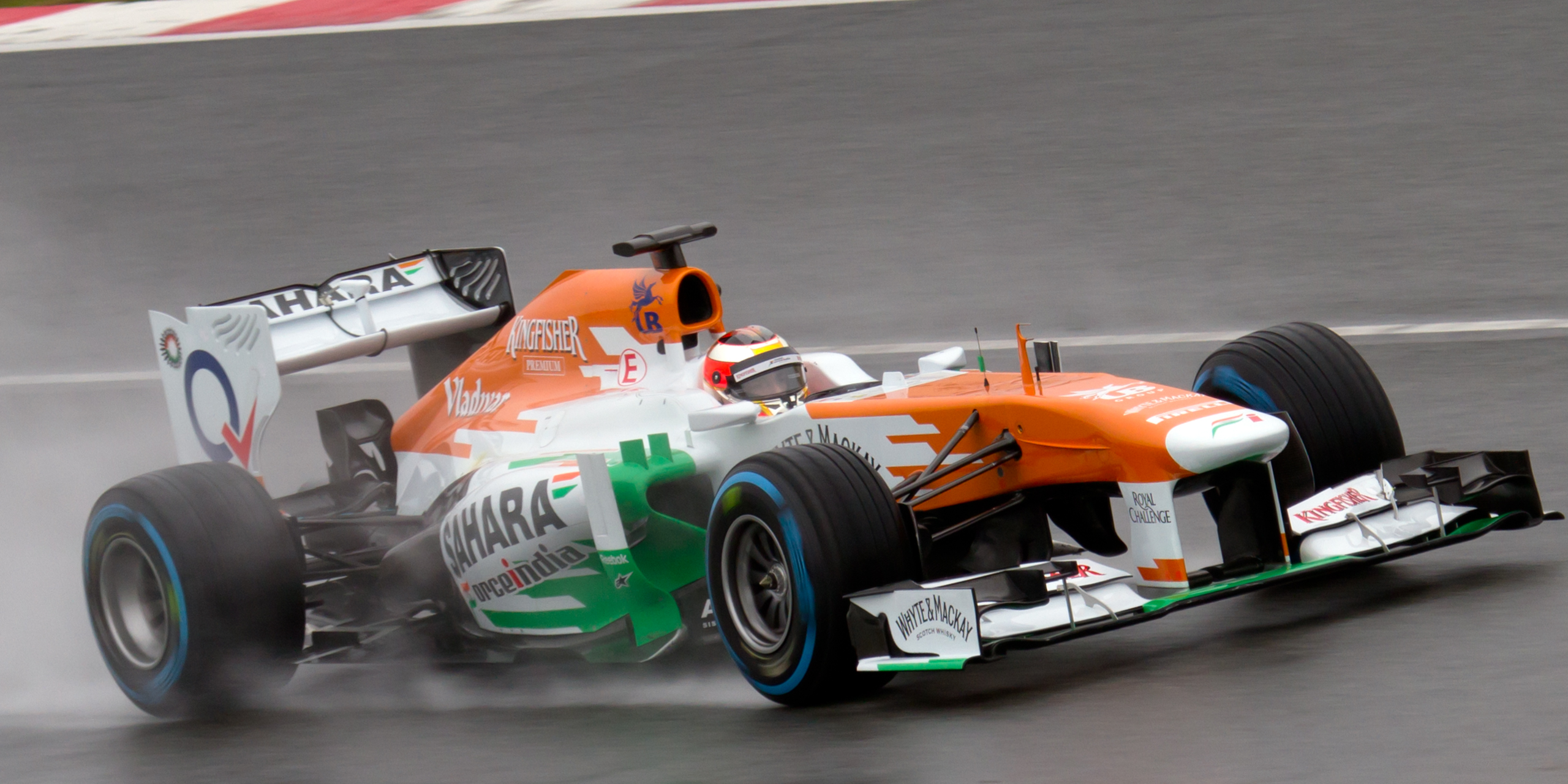
Jules Bianchi driving for Force India at the pre-season test.

The 2013 line-up featured Paul di Resta for the third successive year. The season also witnessed Adrian Sutil returning to the team line-up, replacing Nico Hülkenberg as the team's Second Driver. The team's new car, the VJM06 was launched on 1 February 2013 at the team's base near the Silverstone Circuit.

At the season-opening Australian Grand Prix, Sutil finished seventh, while di Resta finished eighth, giving the team their best ever start to a season. At the fourth round of the season in Bahrain, di Resta finished fourth, while Sutil finished thirteenth.

Force India finished their 2013 season in sixth place with 77 points.

=== 2014 season ===
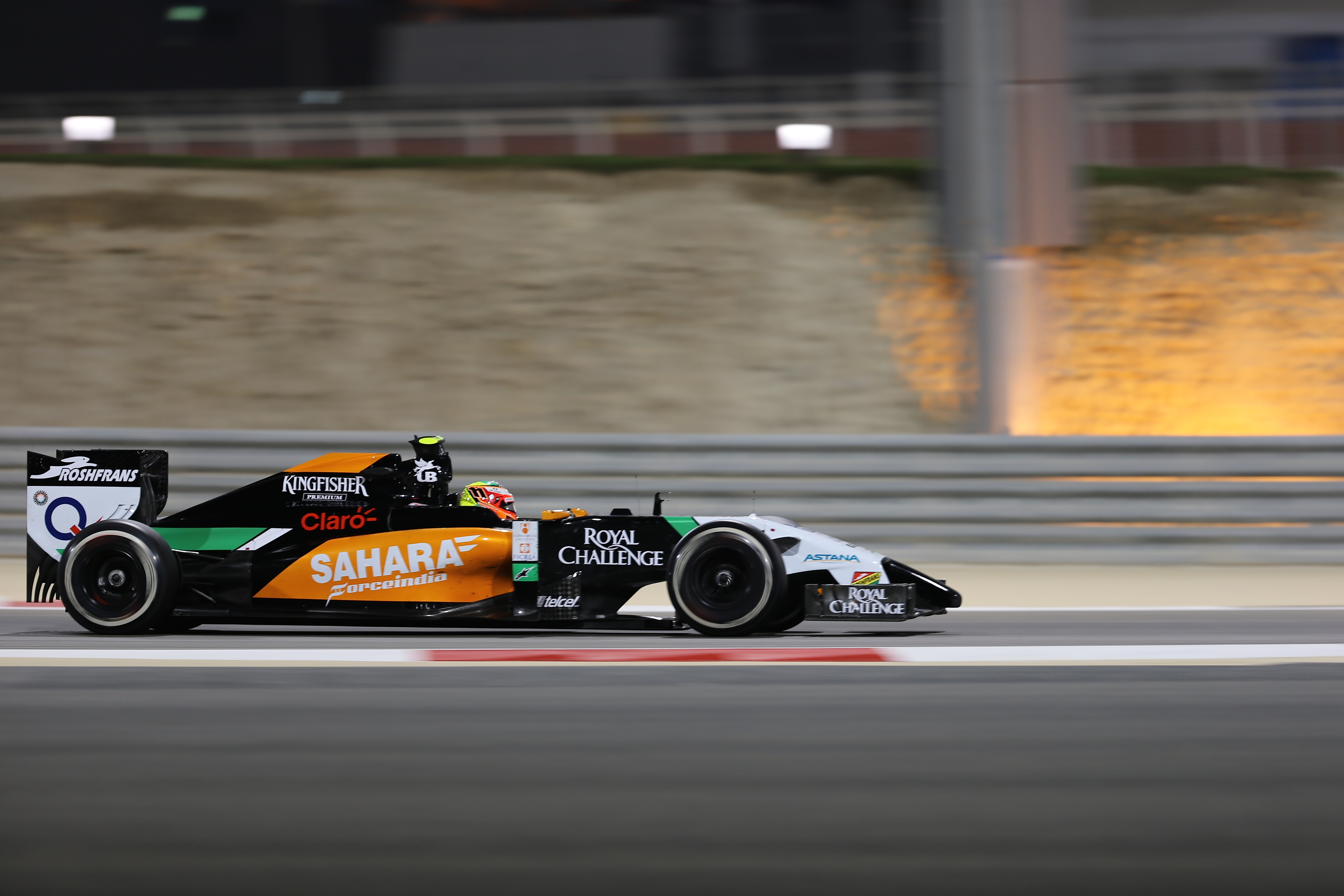
Sergio Pérez driving for Force India at the 2014 Bahrain Grand Prix.

Nico Hülkenberg returned to the team for 2014, while Paul di Resta was replaced by Sergio Pérez. Adrian Sutil moved to Sauber and was replaced by Nico Hülkenberg from Sauber. Daniel Juncadella was signed by the team as a reserve driver. The season opener in Australia saw Hülkenberg finish sixth while Pérez finished tenth after the disqualification of Daniel Ricciardo. This was also the first time Hülkenberg completed a lap at the Albert Park circuit. At the Bahrain Grand Prix, Pérez put Force India on the podium with a third-place finish, its first time on the podium since Belgium in 2009. In Austria, Pérez achieved the third fastest lap in Force India's history. Force India were good after the major regulation change of hybrid engines and turbocharged powertrains, as they finished in sixth place with 155 points; 125 points ahead of seventh-placed Toro Rosso.

=== 2015 season ===
On 19 October 2014, the team stated Hülkenberg had secured his seat for 2015. On 7 November 2014, before the Brazilian Grand Prix, Force India announced that Pérez would remain with the team for the 2015 season. Pérez stated that contract negotiations were "ongoing", in regards to a further contract extension. The deal was officially confirmed two weeks later at the Abu Dhabi Grand Prix, with Pérez signing a two-year contract, until the end of the 2016 season.

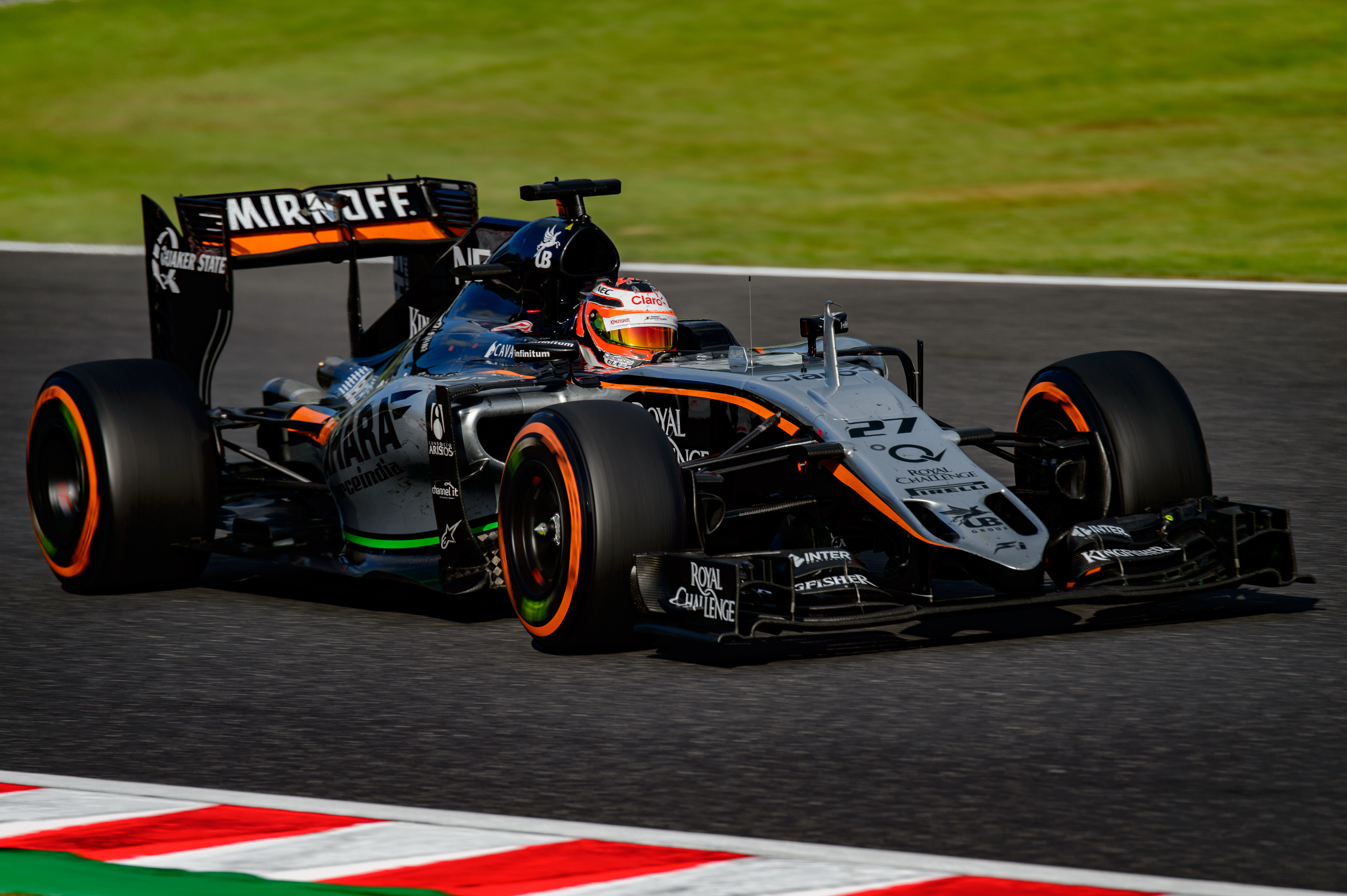
Nico Hülkenberg driving for Force India at the 2015 Japanese Grand Prix.

Force India missed the first pre-season test in Jerez, due to an unexplained setback in the development of the Force India VJM08. It was later revealed that Force India was, according to insider Ralf Bach, "facing financial collapse," and was "currently insolvent." He also suggested that the delays in the VJM08 were due to the fact that "important parts suppliers have not been paid". Robert Fernley, deputy Team Principal, later admitted that the team was likely to miss all three pre-season tests, though he said that they might use the 2014 car to do some "driver and tyre work." However, Force India's 2015 car finally broke cover when Hülkenberg hit the track on day two of the third and final test at Barcelona. The car was an updated version of last year's challenger and was immediately reliable. They had a good start to the season with Hülkenberg finishing in a strong seventh place in the Australian Grand Prix. However they struggled thereafter and did not score points until the Bahrain Grand Prix courtesy of an eighth-place finish by Pérez. Both drivers delivered strong results in Monaco and Austria. The team later introduced a highly modified B-spec car at the 2015 British Grand Prix, featuring two distinctive vents in the nose. The car was a significant step forward from its predecessor, particularly in high-speed corners. In Belgium, Pérez almost took the lead of the race on lap one and ultimately finished in a strong fifth place. He followed up this drive with a sixth-place finish in Monza and seventh in Singapore. In September Sahara Force India lodged a formal complaint to the European Union against Formula One for breaching competition laws. At the Russian Grand Prix, Pérez put Force India on the podium with a third-place finish, its first podium since the 2014 Bahrain Grand Prix. Hülkenberg and Pérez finished seventh and eighth in Pérez' home race in Mexico City. This upturn in form helped Force India achieve their best placing of 5th place with 136 points in the Constructors' Championship, although scoring 19 fewer points than its predecessor. This is a remarkable achievement considering the team's financial plight and their late preparations of the season by delaying the B spec version of their car. The Force India VJM08 for 2015 was suitable for the aerodynamic changes from the 2014 season.

=== 2016 season ===
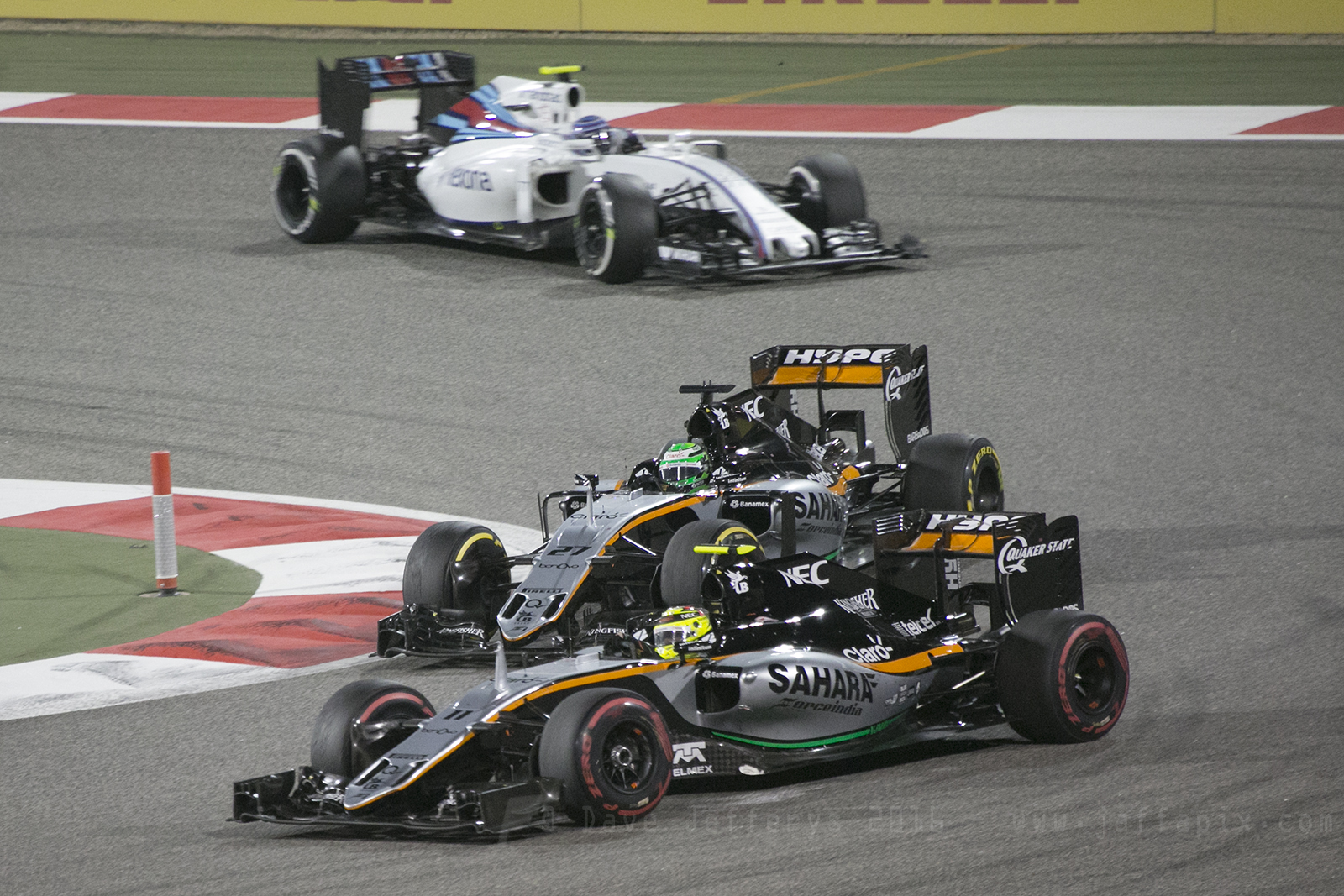
Pérez leads Hülkenberg in the 2016 Bahrain Grand Prix

Force India retained Hülkenberg and Pérez for a third successive season in 2016. It proved to be the most successful season in the team's history to that point, after finishing fourth in the Constructors' Championship with 173 points.

Pérez scored his first of two podium finishes at the Monaco Grand Prix, finishing third, which was also the first time that the team had scored a podium at Monaco in any of its guises – Jordan, Midland, Spyker or Force India. Pérez finished third again two races later at the European Grand Prix in Baku. At the Belgian Grand Prix the team managed to get their first double-finish within the top-five since the 2014 Bahrain Grand Prix with Hülkenberg finishing fourth and Pérez finishing in fifth. As a result, the team took fourth place in the Constructors' Championship from Williams, their highest ever finishing position in the team's history.

=== 2017 season ===
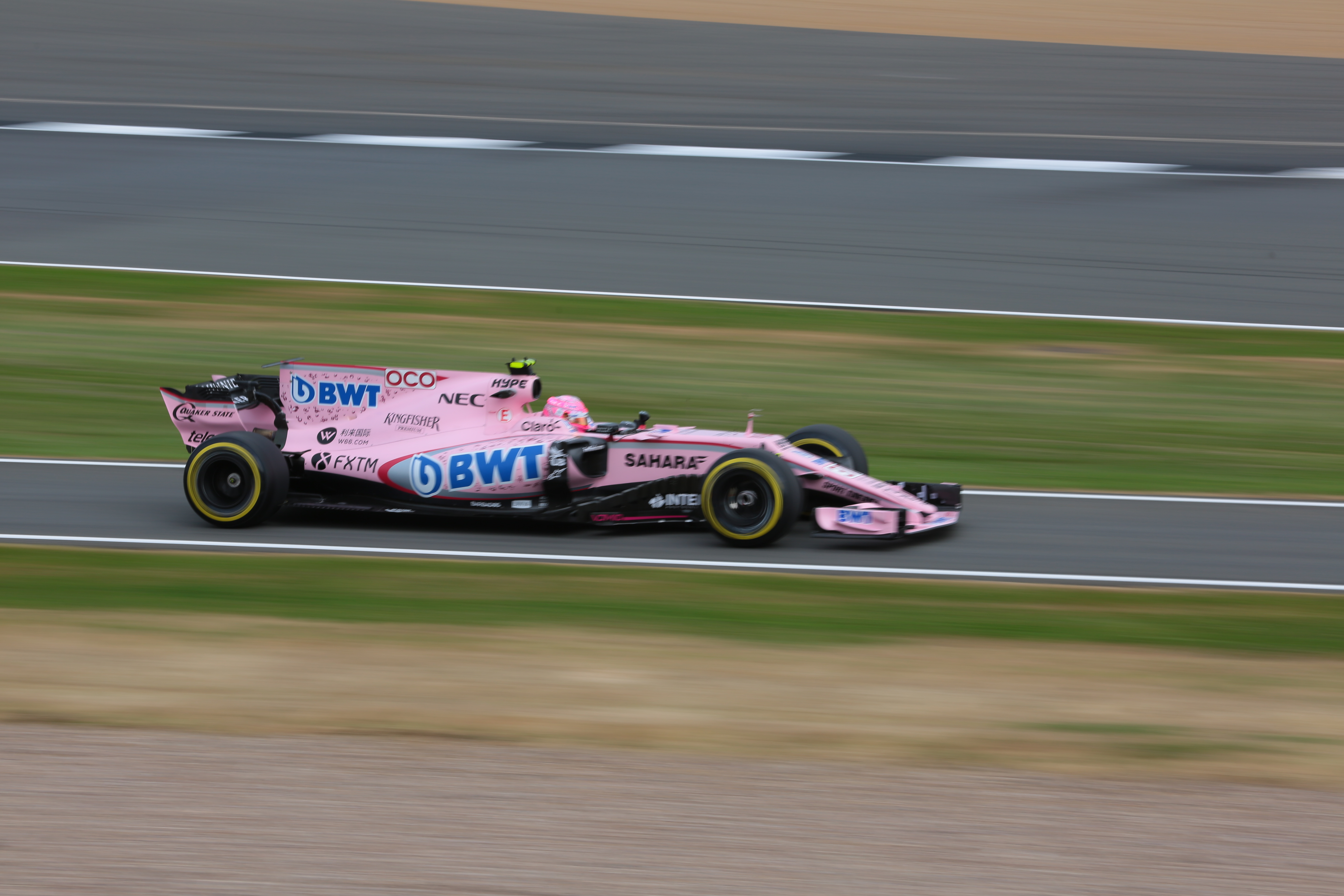
Esteban Ocon driving for Force India at the 2017 British Grand Prix.

In 2017, Hülkenberg left Force India to join Renault. Esteban Ocon was signed to replace him in his first full season in Formula One, having driven for Manor during the second half of the 2016 season. Pérez remained at Force India for a fourth season.

The VJM10 brought a change to a pink livery, following a new sponsorship deal with BWT.

Ocon and Pérez finished the first five races of the season in the points, notably at the Spanish Grand Prix with Pérez finishing fourth and Ocon a career-best fifth. This run of points finished ended at the Monaco Grand Prix with both cars finishing outside the points. The two have been involved in a number of collisions in subsequent races. At the Azerbaijan Grand Prix, both drivers collided with each other with Pérez damaging his front left suspension and losing his front wing, before eventually retiring from the race. Ocon recovered from a puncture to finish sixth. At the Belgian Grand Prix, the two collided again whilst battling for position with Ocon damaging his front wing and Pérez getting a puncture. Ocon finished ninth but Pérez retired from the damage caused by the puncture late in the race.

The team secured fourth place in the Constructors' Championship for a second successive season at the Mexican Grand Prix. The points total at the end of this season was 187, the team's best points tally ever.

=== 2018 season ===
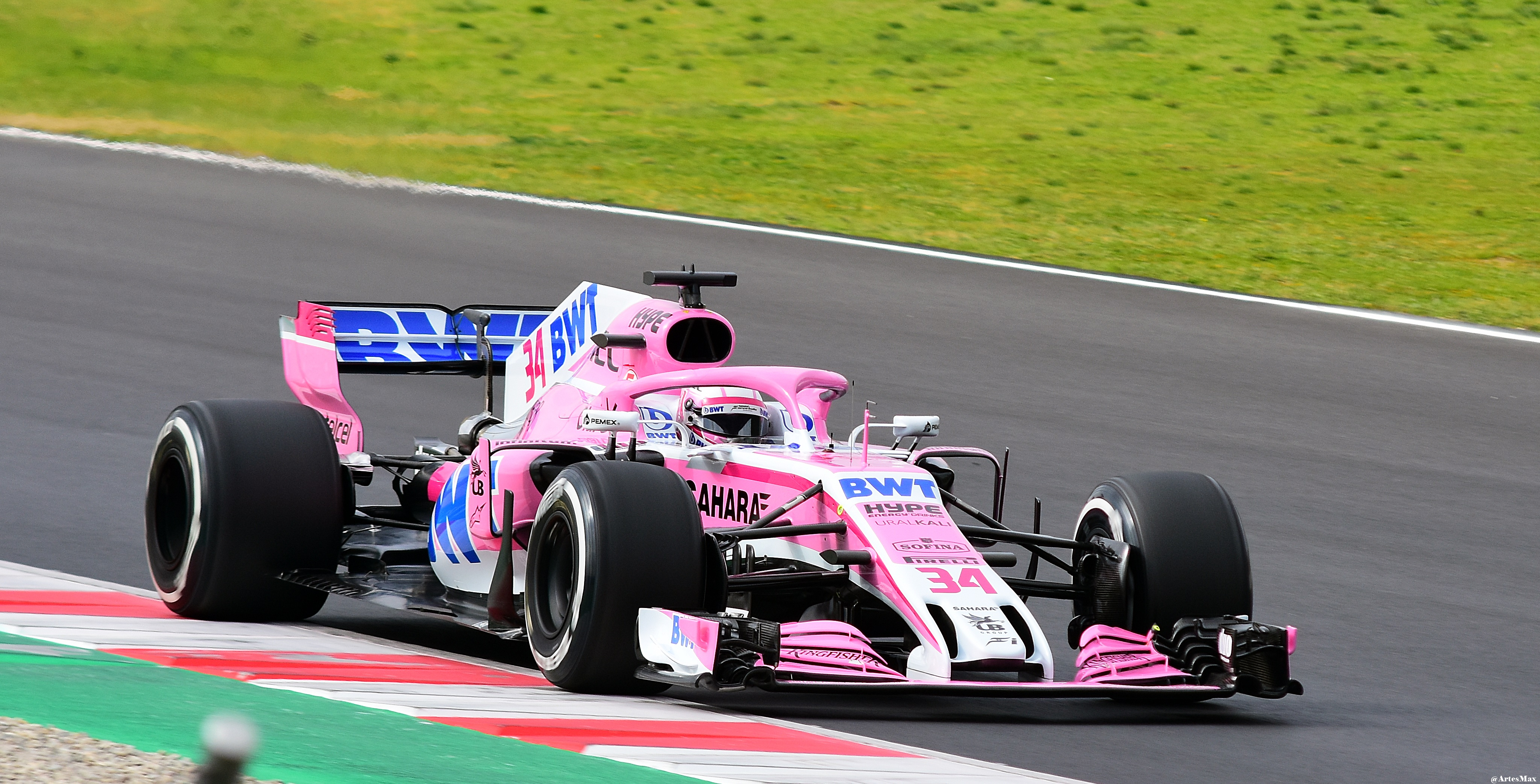
Nikita Mazepin testing the last Force India car the Force India VJM11 during pre-season testing in Barcelona.

For the 2018 season the team retained the 2017 line up of Sergio Pérez and Esteban Ocon. At the opening race in Australia, Sergio Pérez and Esteban Ocon finished 11th and 12th respectively.

The team was put into administration during the Hungarian Grand Prix. The legal action was instigated by a group of creditors, including Sergio Pérez, as a means of allowing the team to continue to operate while a new owner was sought. Pérez justified the action as a response to a winding-up petition filed by HMRC and supported by Formtech, a supplier, which would have resulted in an unmanaged insolvency of the company and almost certain collapse of the team. A consortium led by Lawrence Stroll ended up acquiring the team's assets.

Approaching the 2018 Belgian Grand Prix, the situation regarding the team's ability to compete remained unsure, as in order to buy the shares in the team, the consortium needed agreement with the creditors of the parent company - including 13 banks which held a freezing order over the assets of the parent. Agreement could not be reached in time, so the consortium was unable to buy the shares, and was limited to purchasing only the assets of the team. The team then had to participate in the F1 Championship under a new name, thus the adding of "Racing Point" to the team's name. The FIA excluded the former Force India entry from the championship "due to its inability to complete the season", and welcomed the new legal entity, Racing Point Force India F1 Team, that was allowed to race, but not to keep any points of the old team. This signaled the end of the constructor that had been founded for the 2008 season.

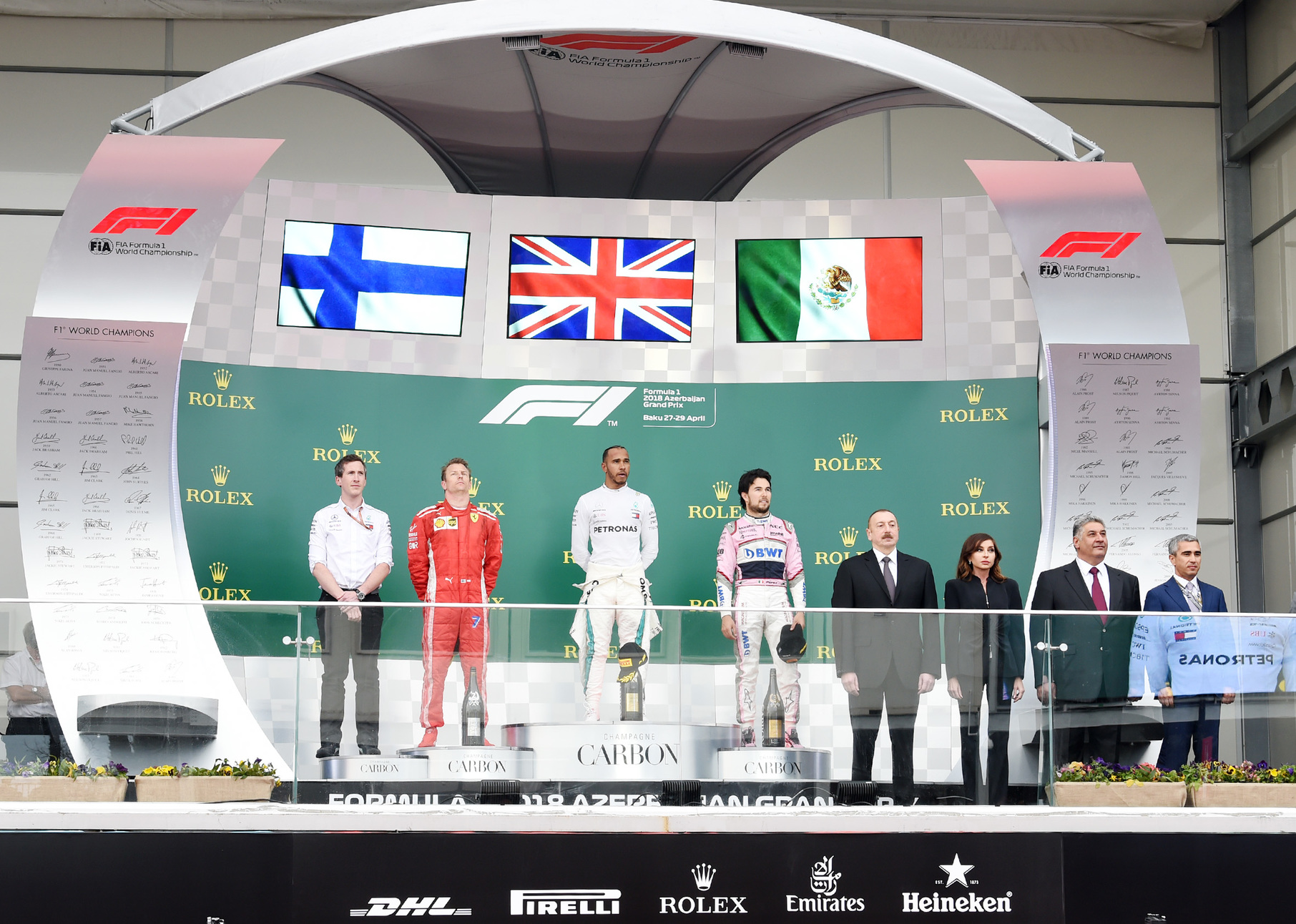
The last podium of the Indian team at the 2018 Azerbaijan Grand Prix: Lewis Hamilton, Kimi Räikkönen and Sergio Pérez.

== Sponsorship and partners ==
Kingfisher, a brand owned by Vijay Mallya, was the primary sponsor. Other sponsors for 2008 included ICICI Bank, Medion, Kanyan Capital, Reebok and Reliance Industries Limited. The above sponsors, except ICICI Bank and Kanyan Capital, continued to sponsor the team in 2009. New sponsors include AVG, Airbus and Whyte & Mackay.

In December 2009, Computational Research Laboratories (CRL), a wholly owned subsidiary of Tata Sons, and Force India Formula One Team announced an exclusive three-year multimillion-dollar partnership deal to offer a fully automated Computational Fluid Dynamics (CFD) solution to aid the design of the team's next generation race cars as well improve aerodynamic efficiency in the current racing models. Force India F1 has tied up with Airbus and EADS for technological support, and has a technical partnership with McLaren.

In October 2011, Indian company Sahara India Pariwar purchased 42.5% of the team's shares for $100 million. Mallya retained 42.5%, and the remaining 15% belonged to the Mol family. The team was renamed Sahara Force India as a result. The shares sold were newly issued; Mallya and Mol did not sell any of their existing shares.

Brazilian auto parts manufacturer Aethra joined the team as an official partner in 2012. Other sponsors include Kingfisher Airlines (former), Whyte and Mackay, United Breweries Group, Vladivar Vodka, AVG Technologies, Alpinestars, Reebok, Schroth Racing, Muc-Off, Hackett, Chatham-Marine, UPS Direct, STILL and STL. Smirnoff announced a partnership with the team in May 2014. Univa announced a partnership with the team in June 2014. Force India announced a partnership with the Japanese company NEC Corporation (Mexican Division) for the 2015 season. Force India supported Hilmer Motorsport in GP2 and GP3 in 2014. In 2015 Force India announced a partnership with Adaptavist. Since 2011, Force India have also provided backing to teenager Jehan Daruvala following his win of the team's 'One in a Billion' competition.

Hype Energy Drinks has been a Force India sponsor since the 2015 season, with their CEO, former Formula 1 driver Bertrand Gachot, having driven for predecessor team Jordan during the 1991 season. Force India have featured Hype Energy branding on the rear wing and side pods of the car for races where alcohol advertising is prohibited. Hype Energy also supply the drivers with personal drinks bottles for races.

On 14 March 2017, Force India announced a new sponsorship with BWT AG, which saw the VJM10 gain a striking pink livery, leading to the 'Pink Panther' nickname used for the cars by fans, commentators and the team themselves on social media. Another new sponsor for 2017 was whisky brand Johnnie Walker, with whom Force India struck a multi-year deal.

== Racing record ==
Year	Name	Car	Engine	Tyres	No.	Drivers	Points	WCC
2008	Force India Formula One Team	VJM01	Ferrari 056 2.4 V8	B	20; 21	(Germany) Adrian Sutil (Italy) Giancarlo Fisichella	0	10th
2009	Force India Formula One Team	VJM02	Mercedes FO 108W 2.4 V8	B	20; 21; 21	(Germany) Adrian Sutil (Italy) Giancarlo Fisichella (Italy) Vitantonio Liuzzi	13	9th
2010	Force India Formula One Team	VJM03	Mercedes FO 108X 2.4 V8	B	14; 15	(Germany) Adrian Sutil (Italy) Vitantonio Liuzzi	68	7th
2011	Force India Formula One Team (1–15); Sahara Force India Formula One Team (16–19)	VJM04	Mercedes FO 108Y 2.4 V8	P	14; 15	(Germany) Adrian Sutil (United Kingdom) Paul di Resta	69	6th
2012	Sahara Force India F1 Team	VJM05	Mercedes FO 108Z 2.4 V8	P	11; 12	(United Kingdom) Paul di Resta (Germany) Nico Hülkenberg	109	7th
2013	Sahara Force India F1 Team	VJM06	Mercedes FO 108F 2.4 V8	P	14; 15	(United Kingdom) Paul di Resta (Germany) Adrian Sutil	77	6th
2014	Sahara Force India F1 Team	VJM07	Mercedes PU106A Hybrid 1.6 V6t	P	11; 27	(Mexico) Sergio Pérez (Germany) Nico Hülkenberg	155	6th
2015	Sahara Force India F1 Team	VJM08; VJM08B	Mercedes PU106B Hybrid 1.6 V6t	P	11; 27	(Mexico) Sergio Pérez (Germany) Nico Hülkenberg	136	5th
2016	Sahara Force India F1 Team	VJM09	Mercedes PU106C Hybrid 1.6 V6t	P	11; 27	(Mexico) Sergio Pérez (Germany) Nico Hülkenberg	173	4th
2017	Sahara Force India F1 Team	VJM10	Mercedes M08 EQ Power+ 1.6 V6t	P	11; 31	(Mexico) Sergio Pérez (France) Esteban Ocon	187	4th
2018	Sahara Force India F1 Team	VJM11	Mercedes M09 EQ Power+ 1.6 V6t	P	11; 31	(Mexico) Sergio Pérez (France) Esteban Ocon	0 (Note: Sahara Force India F1 Team drivers scored 59 points prior to when the constructor points were voided)	Ex

== Driver development programme ==
During Force India's time in F1, the team supported multiple drivers on the FIA Global Pathway and gave them the opportunity to participate in Formula One test sessions. These drivers include:

=== Former drivers ===
Driver	Years	Current series
(India) Jehan Daruvala	2012–2018	None
(Colombia) Steven Goldstein	2015	None
(Mexico) Alfonso Celis Jr.	2015–2017	None
(Russia) Nikita Mazepin	2016–2018	None
(Austria) Lucas Auer	2017	Deutsche Tourenwagen Masters
(Canada) Nicholas Latifi	2018	None
