= 2017 Monaco Grand Prix =

6th round of the 2017 Formula One season

Race 6 of 20 in the 2017 Formula One World Championship
← Previous race	Next race →
- Layout of the Circuit de Monte Carlo, Monaco

Race details
- Date: 28 May 2017
- Official name: Formula 1 Grand Prix de Monaco 2017
- Location: Circuit de Monaco; La Condamine and Monte Carlo, Monaco
- Course: Street circuit
- Course length: 3.337 km (2.074 miles)
- Distance: 78 laps, 260.286 km (161.734 miles)
- Weather: Sunny
- Attendance: 200,000

Pole position
Driver	(Finland) Kimi Räikkönen	Ferrari
- Time: 1:12.178

Fastest lap
Driver	(Mexico) Sergio Pérez	Force India-Mercedes
- Time: 1:14.820 on lap 76

Podium
First	(Germany) Sebastian Vettel	Ferrari
Second	(Finland) Kimi Räikkönen	Ferrari
Third	(Australia) Daniel Ricciardo	Red Bull Racing-TAG Heuer

The 2017 Monaco Grand Prix (formally known as the Formula 1 Grand Prix de Monaco 2017) was a Formula One motor race held on 28 May 2017 at the Circuit de Monaco, a street circuit that runs through the Principality of Monaco. It was the sixth round of the 2017 FIA Formula One World Championship, the seventy-fifth time that the Monaco Grand Prix has been held, and the sixty-fourth time it has been a round of the Formula One World Championship since the inception of the series in 1950.

Ferrari driver Sebastian Vettel entered the round holding a six-point lead over Lewis Hamilton in the World Drivers' Championship, with Valtteri Bottas being third. In the World Constructors' Championship, Mercedes held an eight-point lead over Ferrari, with Red Bull Racing a further eighty-one points behind in third.

Kimi Räikkönen started the race from pole position, his first since the 2008 French Grand Prix. In doing so, he broke Giancarlo Fisichella's record for the most race starts between pole positions, with one hundred and twenty-nine starts since his last pole. Sebastian Vettel won the race, Ferrari's first win in Monaco since 2001. Räikkönen finished second as this was Ferrari's first 1–2 finish since 2010 German Grand Prix. Daniel Ricciardo finished third. With the result, Vettel extended his Drivers' Championship lead over Lewis Hamilton, while in the World Constructors' Championship, Ferrari reclaimed the points lead from Mercedes.

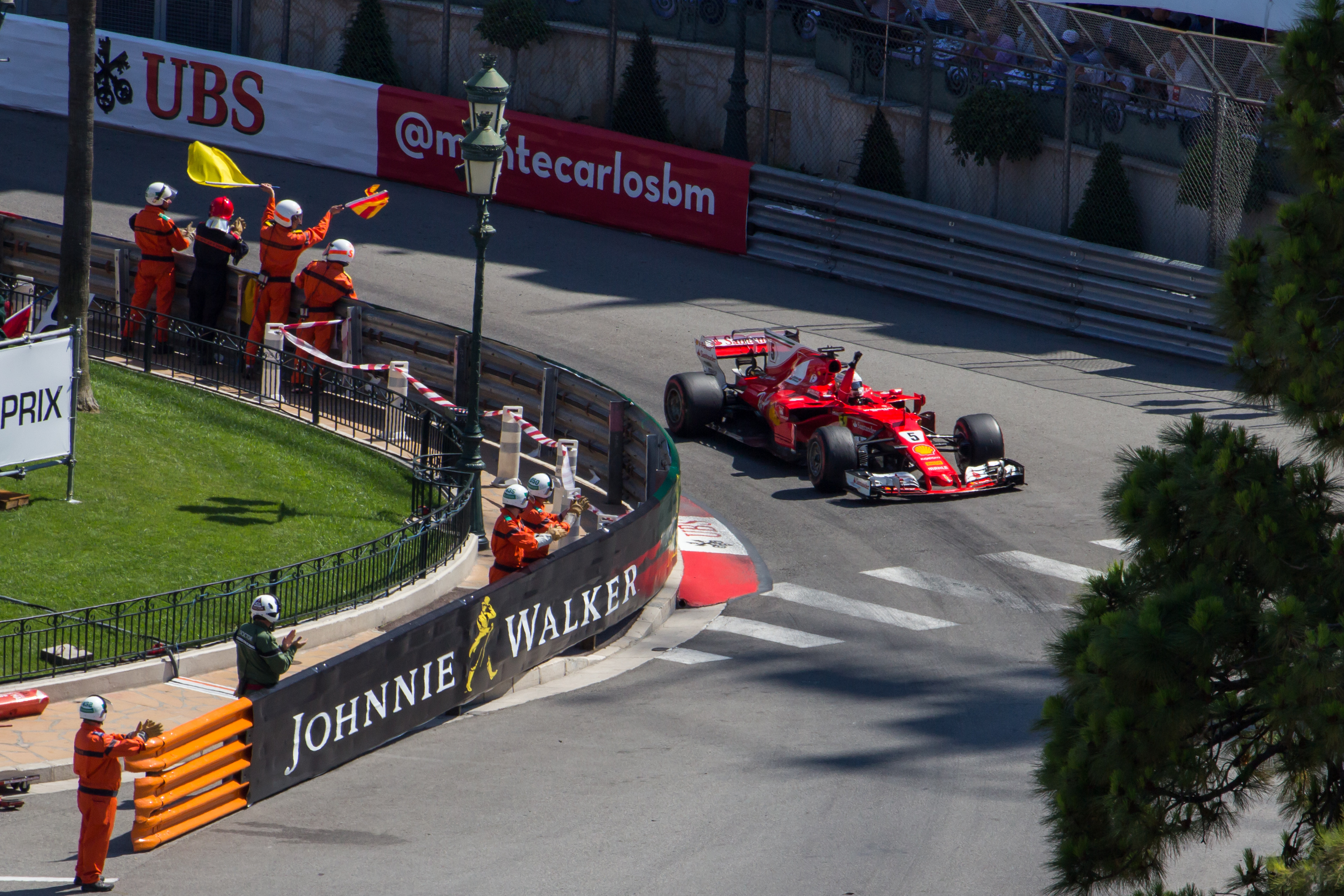
Sebastian Vettel wins the 2017 Monaco Grand Prix

This was also the 306th and final Grand Prix start for 2009 World Champion Jenson Button, who substituted for Fernando Alonso at McLaren while Alonso competed in the Indianapolis 500 that same day. Button retired from the race after a crash with Sauber's Pascal Wehrlein.

== Report ==
=== Background ===
McLaren driver Fernando Alonso missed the race in order to participate in the Indianapolis 500. Alonso became the first active Formula One driver to race at the Indy 500 since Teo Fabi in 1984. Jenson Button replaced Alonso for the race.

Prior to the national anthem, a minute's silence was observed on the grid before the race as a mark of respect to the victims of the Manchester Arena bombing earlier in the week.

=== Free practice ===
Thursday morning's first practice ended with Mercedes' Lewis Hamilton setting the quickest lap with 1:13.425, approximately 0.2 seconds quicker than his championship rival Sebastian Vettel. Max Verstappen was third quickest and Toro Rosso's Daniil Kvyat was the fastest driver not in one of the top three teams, setting the sixth fastest time. In second practice, Vettel was quickest with 1:12.720. Second through fourth were Daniel Ricciardo, Kimi Räikkönen, and Kvyat. The Mercedes team had a disappointing second practice as they finished eighth and tenth, off the pace of their championship rivals Ferrari. The session was stopped part way through for ten minutes due to a crash by Lance Stroll.

Saturday's Free Practice 3 ended with Ferrari's Sebastian Vettel setting the bar at 1:12.395, besting his own time set in FP2 by 0.3 seconds to set a new lap record, whilst nearest rival and teammate Kimi Räikkönen was 0.3 seconds behind with 1:12.740. The session was interrupted 8 minutes in by yellow flags when Esteban Ocon of Force India crashed in the swimming pool section, mimicking an incident Max Verstappen had during the 2016 qualifying session. Free practice eventually resumed with 4 minutes remaining. Daniel Ricciardo had a brake-by-wire failure and ended up retiring from the session, leaving him sixth with 1:13.392. McLaren driver Jenson Button ended the session in twelfth, but incurred a 15-place grid penalty for changing the MGU-H and turbocharger, which would be applied after qualifying.

=== Qualifying ===
Ferrari's Kimi Räikkönen qualified on pole position for the first time in 9 years; his last pole position came at the 2008 French Grand Prix, also for Ferrari. His teammate and championship leader Sebastian Vettel qualified second, followed by Valtteri Bottas and Max Verstappen. Vettel's closest rival, Lewis Hamilton, qualified in fourteenth; he struggled warming up the tyres and his final flying lap in Q2 was impeded by Stoffel Vandoorne who had crashed towards the end of the session. Despite Vandoorne's accident, both McLarens had made it into Q3 for the first time in 2017; Jenson Button qualified in ninth place on his return, but due to his fifteen-place grid penalty would start from the back of the grid, and eventually opted to start from the pit lane.

=== Race ===
Räikkönen led from the start until he pitted on lap 33. His teammate Vettel stayed out longer and when he eventually pitted, he came out ahead of Räikkönen and went on to win his 3rd race of the season and extended his championship lead to 25 points over Hamilton, who finished in 7th in a recovery drive after his poor qualifying. This win gave Ferrari their first 1-2 finish since the controversial 2010 German Grand Prix. Daniel Ricciardo finished in 3rd, despite lightly hitting the wall late in the race, jumping both Bottas and Verstappen by staying out longer on the ultra-softs in a strategy akin to Sebastian Vettel. Carlos Sainz had his best finish of the year so far with 6th for Toro Rosso. He was followed by Hamilton, Grosjean, Massa and Magnussen, who rounded off the points. It was the first time in Haas' history that they achieved a double points finish. It was also the first time in 2017 that both Force Indias finished out of the points with a late collision between Pérez and Kvyat, while running in the points, sent Pérez to last and Kvyat out of the race. Stoffel Vandoorne looked set to score McLaren's first points of the season before hitting the wall after being forced onto the breaking up asphalt by Sergio Pérez. Jenson Button, meanwhile, retired with suspension damage on his one-off return, much like his original retirement in the 2016 Abu Dhabi Grand Prix, after colliding with Sauber's Pascal Wehrlein, leaving Wehrlein perched up vertically on the wall. The other Sauber of Marcus Ericsson retired after hitting the wall at turn 1 under the safety car. The Renault of Nico Hülkenberg retired early on with a gearbox failure, while running in 10th. Lance Stroll was another retiree.

After the race Sergio Pérez and Jenson Button had two penalty points (each) added to their Super Licences, both for causing a collision.

== Classification ==
=== Qualifying ===
Pos.	Car no.	Driver	Constructor	Qualifying times			Final grid
Pos.	Car no.	Driver	Constructor	Q1	Q2	Q3	Final grid
1	7	(Finland) Kimi Räikkönen	Ferrari	1:13.117	1:12.231	1:12.178	1
2	5	(Germany) Sebastian Vettel	Ferrari	1:13.090	1:12.449	1:12.221	2
3	77	(Finland) Valtteri Bottas	Mercedes	1:13.325	1:12.901	1:12.223	3
4	33	(Netherlands) Max Verstappen	Red Bull Racing-TAG Heuer	1:13.078	1:12.697	1:12.496	4
5	3	(Australia) Daniel Ricciardo	Red Bull Racing-TAG Heuer	1:13.219	1:13.011	1:12.998	5
6	55	(Spain) Carlos Sainz Jr.	Toro Rosso	1:13.526	1:13.397	1:13.162	6
7	11	(Mexico) Sergio Pérez	Force India-Mercedes	1:13.530	1:13.430	1:13.329	7
8	8	(France) Romain Grosjean	Haas-Ferrari	1:13.786	1:13.203	1:13.349	8
9	22	(United Kingdom) Jenson Button	McLaren-Honda	1:13.723	1:13.453	1:13.613	PL^{1}
10	2	(Belgium) Stoffel Vandoorne	McLaren-Honda	1:13.476	1:13.249	No time	12^{2}
11	26	(Russia) Daniil Kvyat	Toro Rosso	1:13.899	1:13.516		9
12	27	(Germany) Nico Hülkenberg	Renault	1:13.787	1:13.628		10
13	20	(Denmark) Kevin Magnussen	Haas-Ferrari	1:13.531	1:13.959		11
14	44	(United Kingdom) Lewis Hamilton	Mercedes	1:13.640	1:14.106		13
15	19	(Brazil) Felipe Massa	Williams-Mercedes	1:13.796	1:20.529		14
16	31	(France) Esteban Ocon	Force India-Mercedes	1:14.101			15
17	30	(United Kingdom) Jolyon Palmer	Renault	1:14.696			16
18	18	(Canada) Lance Stroll	Williams-Mercedes	1:14.893			17
19	94	(Germany) Pascal Wehrlein	Sauber-Ferrari	1:15.159			18
20	9	(Sweden) Marcus Ericsson	Sauber-Ferrari	1:15.276			19^{3}
107% time: 1:18.193

Notes

- ^1 – Jenson Button received a fifteen-place grid penalty for exceeding the maximum quota of engine components. (Note: As Jenson Button replaced Fernando Alonso for the race, he was considered to be driving Alonso's car and thus using Alonso's engine components rather than his own.) In addition, he was required to start from the pit lane, as his car was modified while under Parc Fermé conditions.
- ^2 – Stoffel Vandoorne received a three-place grid penalty for causing an avoidable accident with Felipe Massa in the previous race.
- ^3 – Marcus Ericsson received a five-place grid penalty for an unscheduled gearbox change.

=== Race ===
Pos.	No.	Driver	Constructor	Laps	Time/Retired	Grid	Points
1	5	(Germany) Sebastian Vettel	Ferrari	78	1:44:44.340	2	25
2	7	(Finland) Kimi Räikkönen	Ferrari	78	+3.145	1	18
3	3	(Australia) Daniel Ricciardo	Red Bull Racing-TAG Heuer	78	+3.745	5	15
4	77	(Finland) Valtteri Bottas	Mercedes	78	+5.517	3	12
5	33	(Netherlands) Max Verstappen	Red Bull Racing-TAG Heuer	78	+6.199	4	10
6	55	(Spain) Carlos Sainz Jr.	Toro Rosso	78	+12.038	6	8
7	44	(United Kingdom) Lewis Hamilton	Mercedes	78	+15.801	13	6
8	8	(France) Romain Grosjean	Haas-Ferrari	78	+18.150	8	4
9	19	(Brazil) Felipe Massa	Williams-Mercedes	78	+19.445	14	2
10	20	(Denmark) Kevin Magnussen	Haas-Ferrari	78	+21.443	11	1
11	30	(United Kingdom) Jolyon Palmer	Renault	78	+22.737	16	
12	31	(France) Esteban Ocon	Force India-Mercedes	78	+23.725	15	
13^{1}	11	(Mexico) Sergio Pérez	Force India-Mercedes	78	+49.089	7	
14^{2}	26	(Russia) Daniil Kvyat	Toro Rosso	71	Collision damage	9	
15^{2}	18	(Canada) Lance Stroll	Williams-Mercedes	71	Oil pressure	17	
Ret	2	(Belgium) Stoffel Vandoorne	McLaren-Honda	66	Accident	12	
Ret	9	(Sweden) Marcus Ericsson	Sauber-Ferrari	63	Accident	19	
Ret	22	(United Kingdom) Jenson Button	McLaren-Honda	57	Collision damage	PL	
Ret^{3}	94	(Germany) Pascal Wehrlein	Sauber-Ferrari	57	Collision	18	
Ret	27	(Germany) Nico Hülkenberg	Renault	15	Gearbox	10	

Notes

- ^1 – Sergio Pérez received a ten-second time penalty for causing a collision with Daniil Kvyat.
- ^2 – Daniil Kvyat and Lance Stroll were classified as they had completed over 90% of the winner's race distance.
- ^3 – Pascal Wehrlein received a five-second time penalty for an unsafe release. The penalty made no difference as he had retired from the race.

== Championship standings after the race ==
Drivers' Championship standings

Pos.	Driver	Points
1	(Germany) Sebastian Vettel	129
2	(United Kingdom) Lewis Hamilton	104
3	(Finland) Valtteri Bottas	75
4	(Finland) Kimi Räikkönen	67
5	(Australia) Daniel Ricciardo	52

Constructors' Championship standings

	Pos.	Constructor	Points
1	1	(Italy) Ferrari	196
1	2	(Germany) Mercedes	179
	3	(Austria) Red Bull Racing-TAG Heuer	97
	4	Force India-Mercedes	53
	5	(Italy) Toro Rosso	29

- Note: Only the top five positions are included for both sets of standings.

== See also ==
- 2017 Monte Carlo Formula 2 round

== Notes ==
Previous race: 2017 Spanish Grand Prix	FIA Formula One World Championship; 2017 season	Next race: 2017 Canadian Grand Prix
Previous race: 2016 Monaco Grand Prix	Monaco Grand Prix	Next race: 2018 Monaco Grand Prix
