= Vladivar Vodka =

Brand of Scottish alcoholic drink

Vladivar
- Type: Vodka
- Manufacturer: Whyte and Mackay
- Origin: Scotland

Vladivar Vodka is a brand of vodka distilled in the UK. Originally made in Warrington by the G & J Greenall distillery, the brand was sold in 1990 to Whyte and Mackay and is made today in Scotland. Vladivar is a pure grain, triple-distilled vodka and is filtered with charcoal to achieve maximum purity.

The grain distillery is located at Invergordon, close to the Cromarty Firth in the Highland region of Scotland. The company's bottling plant and Earlsgate distribution centre are likewise located at Grangemouth in the Scottish central belt. Vladivar is marketed in two flavoured versions as well as the original; apple and pear, and sweet raspberry and vanilla.
