= Racing Point RP19 =

2019 Formula One racing car

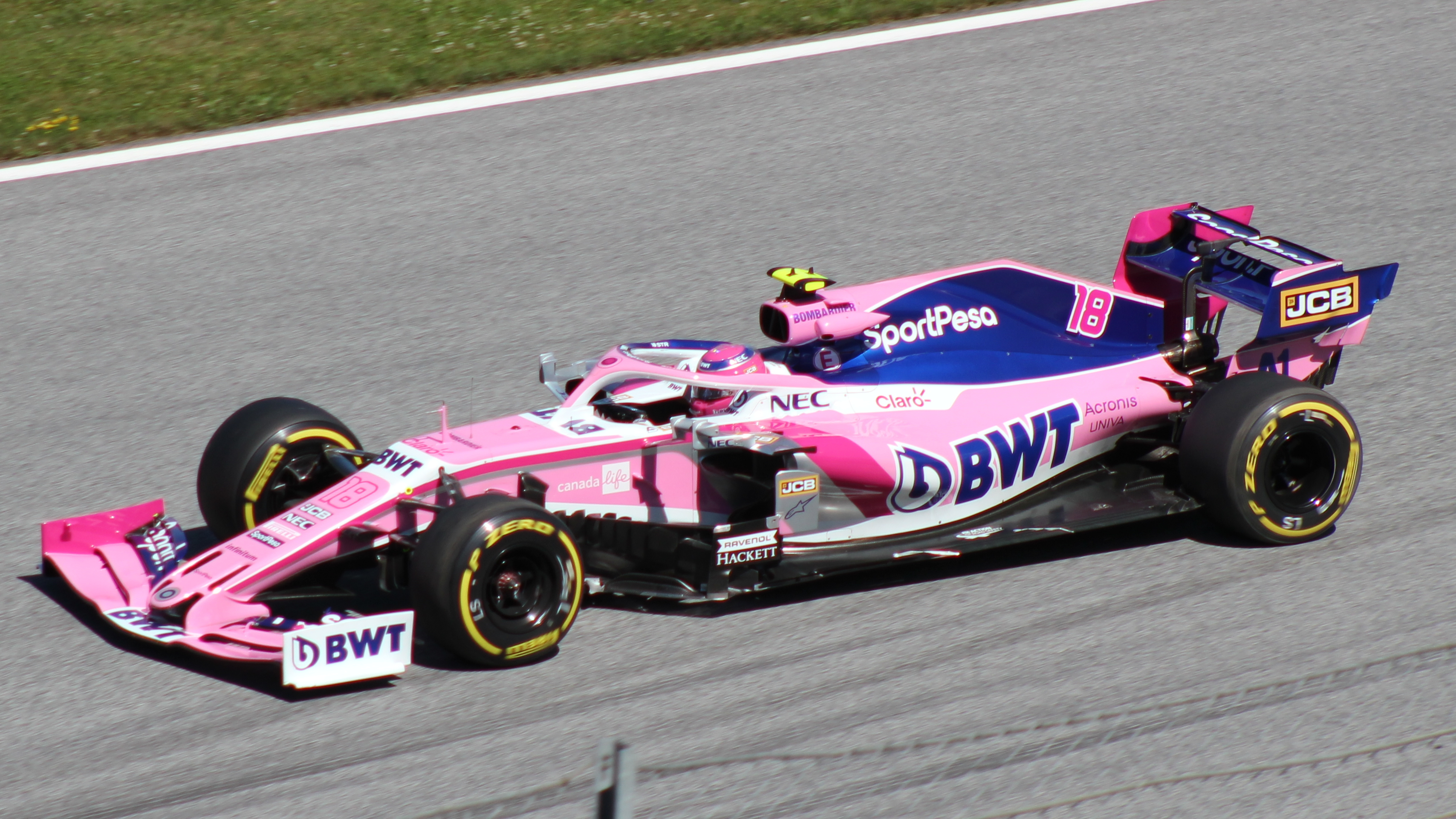
- Lance Stroll driving the RP19 during the Austrian Grand Prix
- Category: Formula One
- Constructor: Racing Point
- Designers: Andrew Green (Technical Director); Simon Phillips (Aerodynamics Director); Akio Haga (Chief Designer); Ian Hall (Chief Designer); Bruce Eddington (Head of Design, Composites); Daniel Carpenter (Head of Design, Mechanical); Andrew Brown (Head of R&D); Jonathan Marshall (Head of Vehicle Science); William Worrall (Head of Aerodynamic Performance); Guru Johl (Chief Aerodynamicist); Mark Gardiner (Deputy Chief Aerodynamicist)
- Predecessor: Force India VJM11
- Successor: Racing Point RP20

Technical specifications
- Chassis: Carbon fibre composite monocoque with Zylon legality side anti-intrusion panels.
- Suspension: Aluminium uprights with carbon fibre composite wishbones, trackrod and pushrod. Inboard chassis mounted torsion springs, dampers and anti-roll bar assembly.
- Length: 5,600 mm (220 in)
- Width: 2,000 mm (79 in)
- Engine: Mercedes M10 EQ Power+ (rebadged as BWT Mercedes) 1.6 L (98 cu in) direct injection V6 turbocharged engine limited to 15,000 RPM in a mid-mounted, rear-wheel drive layout
- Electric motor: Mercedes kinetic and thermal energy recovery systems
- Weight: 743 kg (1,638 lb)
- Fuel: Petronas
- Lubricants: Ravenol
- Brakes: 920E brake calipers and in house design brake by wire system with carbon fibre discs and pads
- Tyres: Pirelli P Zero (Dry/Slick); Pirelli Cinturato (Wet/Treaded)
- Clutch: AP Racing

Competition history
- Notable entrants: SportPesa Racing Point Formula One Team
- Notable drivers: 11. (Mexico) Sergio Pérez; 18. (Canada) Lance Stroll
- Debut: 2019 Australian Grand Prix
- Last event: 2019 Abu Dhabi Grand Prix
Races	Wins	Podiums	Poles	F/Laps
21	0	0	0	0

The Racing Point RP19 is a Formula One racing car designed and developed by the Racing Point F1 Team, to compete in the 2019 Formula One World Championship. It is the first car built by Racing Point after their purchase of the Force India Formula One Team assets in August 2018. The RP19 was driven by Sergio Pérez and Lance Stroll and made its competitive debut at the 2019 Australian Grand Prix.

== Design ==
The RP19 was initially run with the radical "nostril" nosecone design that had been used since the Force India VJM08B in mid-2015 but was later updated into the more conventional design in Belgium to provide better aerodynamics.

== Season summary ==
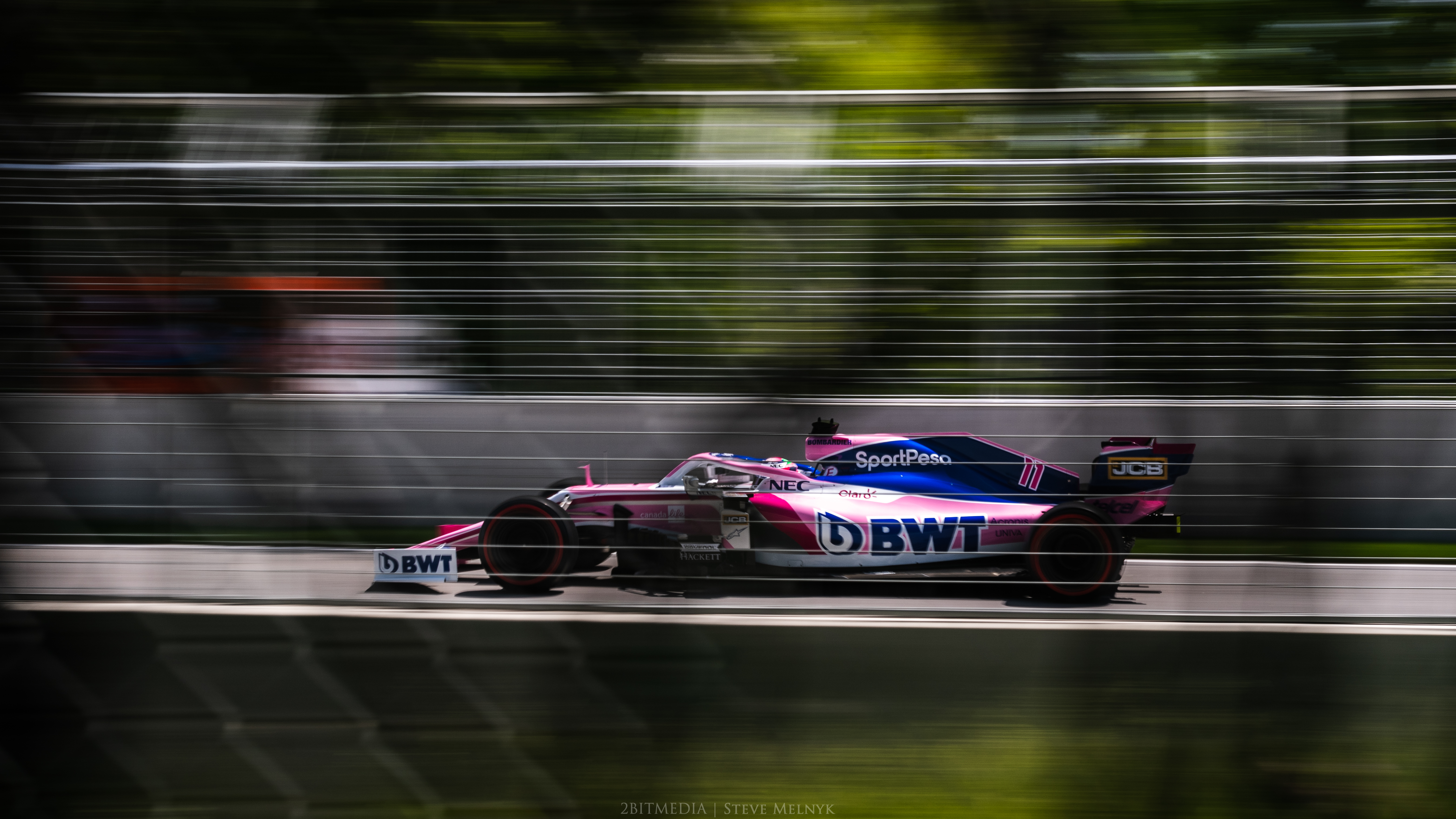
Pérez at the Canadian Grand Prix

Racing Point finished the season in 7th at the World Constructors' Championship. Pérez endured a scoreless streak between the Spanish Grand Prix to the Hungarian Grand Prix, but achieved his highest finishing position with sixth-places in the Azerbaijan Grand Prix and the Belgian Grand Prix. Additionally, he would go on to score points in the last six races of the season. Teammate Stroll achieved highest finish position with a fourth-place finish in the soaked German Grand Prix.

== Livery ==
The RP19 featured a similar white and pink livery with an additional of purple scheme, reflecting with their title sponsor SportPesa, an online gambling company. However, it was replaced with "SpScore.com" in video games due to gambling branding being outlawed. BWT remained as one of their main sponsors.

At the Monaco Grand Prix, the team paid tribute to Niki Lauda, his helmet presented on the halo device.

== Complete Formula One results ==
(key)

Year	Entrant	Engine	Tyres	Drivers	Grands Prix																					Points	WCC
Year	Entrant	Engine	Tyres	Drivers	AUS	BHR	CHN	AZE	ESP	MON	CAN	FRA	AUT	GBR	GER	HUN	BEL	ITA	SIN	RUS	JPN	MEX	USA	BRA	ABU	Points	WCC
2019	SportPesa Racing Point Formula One Team	BWT Mercedes	P	Pérez	13	10	8	6	15	12	12	12	11	17	Ret	11	6	7	Ret	7	8	7	10	9	7	73	7th
2019	SportPesa Racing Point Formula One Team	BWT Mercedes	P	Stroll	9	14	12	9	Ret	16	9	13	14	13	4	17	10	12	13	11	9	12	13	19^{†}	Ret	73	7th

^{†} Driver failed to finish the race, but was classified as they had completed over 90% of the winner's race distance.
