= Racing Point (disambiguation) =

Racing Point was the Racing Point F1 Team, the Formula One team that competed in Formula One in the 2019 and 2020 seasons.

Racing Point may also refer to:

- Racing Point Force India, the Formula One team that raced the second half of the 2018 season
- Racing Point UK, the company that owns the Racing Point and Racing Point Force India teams

== See also ==
- Force India, the team whose car and facilities Racing Point Force India used
- Racing (disambiguation)
- Point (disambiguation)
