= Aston Martin AMR21 =

2021 Formula One racing car by Aston Martin

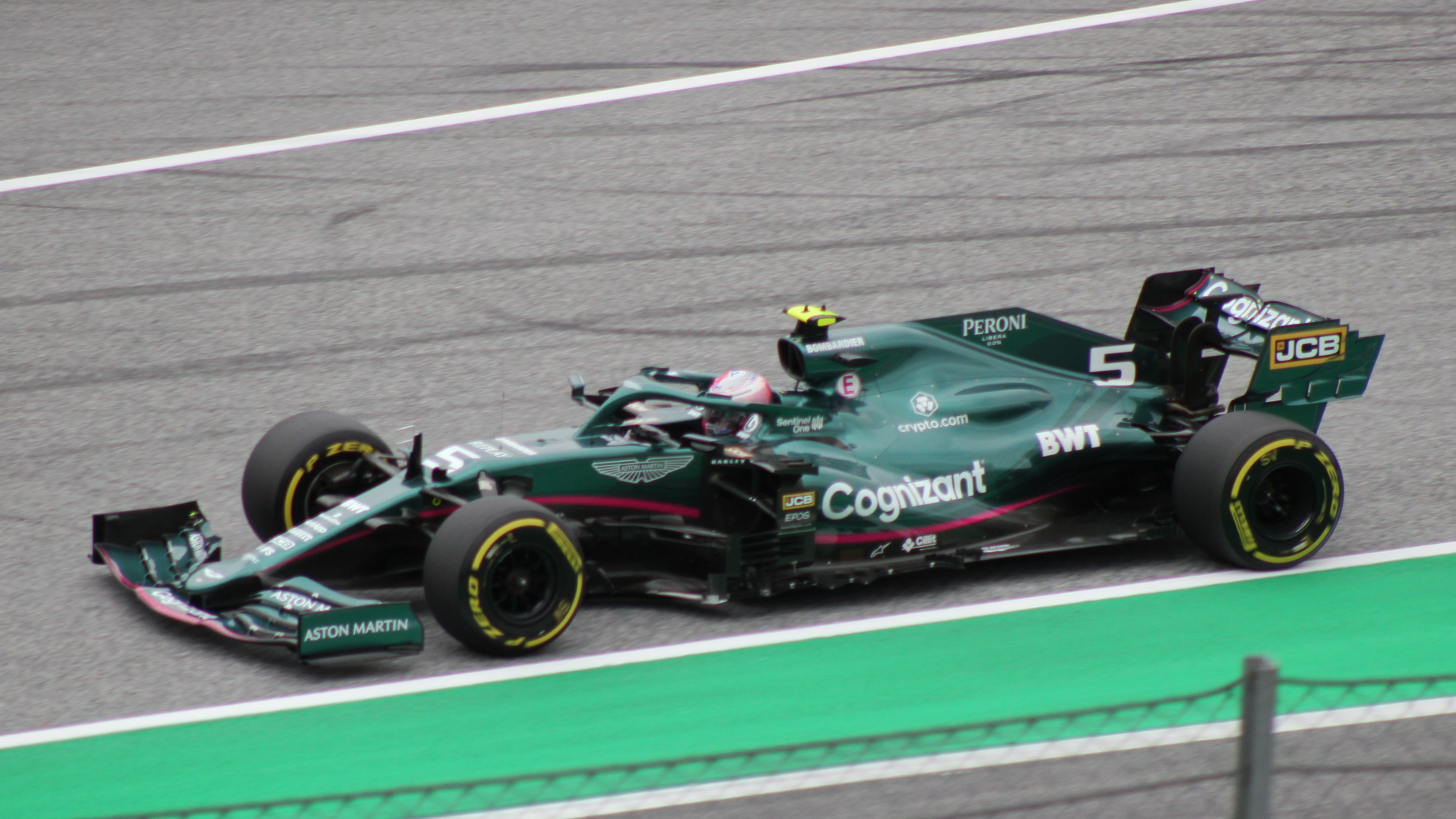
- Sebastian Vettel driving his AMR21 at the Austrian Grand Prix
- Category: Formula One
- Constructor: Aston Martin
- Designers: Andrew Green (Technical Director); Tom McCullough (Performance Director); Akio Haga (Chief Designer); Ian Hall (Chief Designer); Bruce Eddington (Head of Design, Composites); Daniel Carpenter (Head of Design, Mechanical); Andrew Brown (Head of R&D); Craig Gardiner (Head of Vehicle Performance); Jonathan Marshall (Head of Vehicle Science; Robin Gearing (Chief Performance Engineer); William Worrall (Head of Aerodynamic Performance); Guru Johl (Chief Aerodynamicist); Mark Gardiner (Deputy Chief Aerodynamicist)
- Predecessor: Aston Martin DBR5 (as Aston Martin); Racing Point RP20 (as Racing Point)
- Successor: Aston Martin AMR22

Technical specifications
- Length: 5,600 mm (220.5 in)
- Width: 2,000 mm (78.7 in)
- Height: 1,500 mm (59.1 in)
- Engine: Mercedes-AMG F1 M12 E Performance 1.6 L (98 cu in) Turbo Rear-mid mounted
- Weight: 752 kg (1,658 lb)
- Fuel: Petronas
- Tyres: Pirelli P Zero (Dry/Slick); Pirelli Cinturato (Wet/Treaded)

Competition history
- Notable entrants: Aston Martin Cognizant F1 Team
- Notable drivers: 5. (Germany) Sebastian Vettel; 18. (Canada) Lance Stroll
- Debut: 2021 Bahrain Grand Prix
- Last event: 2021 Abu Dhabi Grand Prix
Races	Wins	Podiums	Poles	F/Laps
22	0	1	0	0

The Aston Martin AMR21 is a Formula One racing car designed and developed by the Aston Martin Formula One team, that competed in the 2021 Formula One World Championship. This was the first car to be entered by the returning Aston Martin team. The car was driven by Sebastian Vettel and Lance Stroll. Vettel scored the team's first podium as Aston Martin at the 2021 Azerbaijan Grand Prix. Vettel, who has made a habit of naming his cars since his days at Toro Rosso, named his car "Honey Ryder" in reference to Ursula Andress' character in the 1962 James Bond movie Dr. No. Vettel did not name the AMR21's successor, making this the last car he named prior to his retirement in 2022.

== Initial design and development ==
The car is an evolution of the Racing Point RP20, used by Aston Martin's predecessor team Racing Point during the 2020 championship.

== Season summary ==
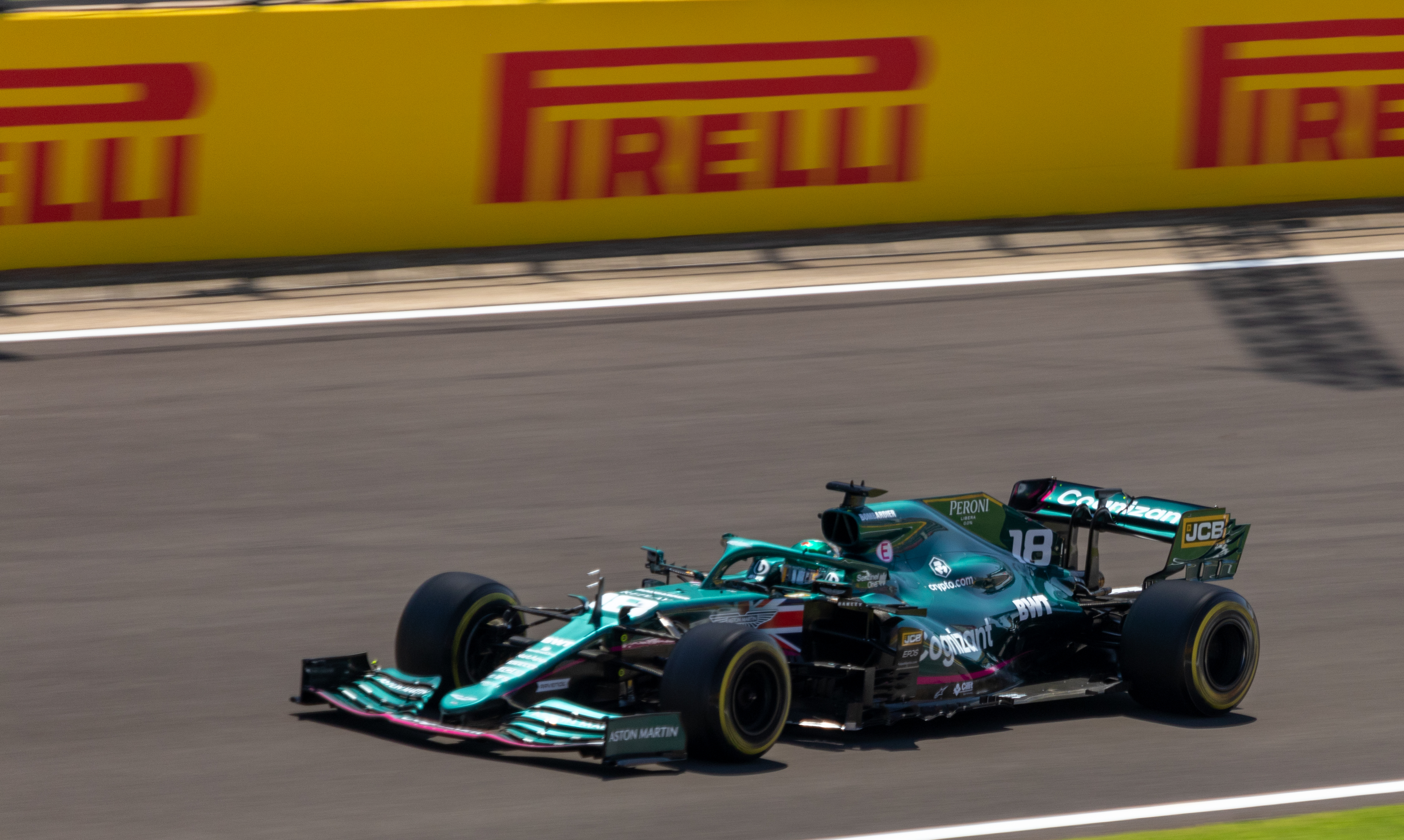
Stroll at the British Grand Prix

At the season-opening Bahrain Grand Prix, Stroll qualified in tenth place. Vettel initially qualified in eighteenth place but prior to the race, he received a five-place grid penalty for failing to respect double yellow flags during qualifying, dropping him to last. Stroll went on to finish tenth place, while Vettel managed to gain six positions from his starting position to fourteenth place before receiving a 10-second penalty due to a collision with Ocon on lap 45, he eventually finished in fifteenth place. At the 2021 Emilia Romagna Grand Prix, Stroll qualified in tenth place with Vettel in thirteenth place. Despite qualifying in thirteenth place, Vettel started from the pit lane due to brake issues. He eventually retired at lap 61 due to gearbox issues. Stroll initially finish in seventh place, however he was given a five-second time penalty post-race for cutting the Tamburello chicane, dropping him to eighth place. At the Azerbaijan Grand Prix, Vettel claimed Aston Martin's first podium in Formula One by finishing 2nd. It would be his final career podium to date; he also finished in second at the Hungarian Grand Prix, but he ended up being disqualified after the race as the stewards were unable to extract sufficient fuel from his car.

== Livery ==
As a British car manufacturer, it was painted in traditional British racing green, tracing their roots from the early involvement in Formula One in 1959 and 1960. The team retained the BWT sponsorship, identified by its pink stripe.

The car ran in a special livery with a Union Jack at their home Grand Prix. The team promoted the movie, No Time to Die at the Italian Grand Prix.

== Racing Pride ==
In June 2021, Racing Pride announced a series of initiatives with Aston Martin promoting LGBTQ+ diversity and inclusion. Coinciding with Pride Month 2021, the collaboration also saw Racing Pride logos appear on the Aston Martin cars at the 2021 French Grand Prix.

Four time F1 Champion, and Aston Martin F1 driver Sebastian Vettel said of the partnership: "I want to help highlight the positivity around the message of inclusion and acceptance. I congratulate the people who have pushed the discussion that has led to wider inclusion; but, equally, I'm aware that more needs to be done to change attitudes and remove much of the remaining negativity. It is great to see Aston Martin Cognizant Formula One team giving this issue support - there is a long road ahead, but I'm really pleased we can play a positive role".

== Later use ==
A modified AMR21 was used during testing of the 2022 tyre compounds after the Abu Dhabi Grand Prix.

The AMR21 was run at the Hungaroring in September 2023 in a private test for Felipe Drugovich and Jessica Hawkins. In October, it was run in a private test at Silverstone Circuit for Luke Browning, as part of Browning's prize for winning the Autosport BRDC Award.

== Complete Formula One results ==
(key)

Year	Entrant	Power unit	Tyres	Driver name	Grands Prix																						Points	WCC pos.
Year	Entrant	Power unit	Tyres	Driver name	BHR	EMI	POR	ESP	MON	AZE	FRA	STY	AUT	GBR	HUN	BEL^{‡}	NED	ITA	RUS	TUR	USA	MXC	SAP	QAT	SAU	ABU	Points	WCC pos.
2021	Aston Martin Cognizant F1 Team	Mercedes-AMG F1 M12	P	(Canada) Lance Stroll	10	8	14	11	8	Ret	10	8	13	8	Ret	20	12	7	11	9	12	14	Ret	6	11	13	77	7th
2021	Aston Martin Cognizant F1 Team	Mercedes-AMG F1 M12	P	(Germany) Sebastian Vettel	15	15†	13	13	5	2	9	12	17†	Ret	DSQ	5	13	12	12	18	10	7	11	10	Ret	11	77	7th

Notes

^{†} Driver failed to finish the race, but was classified as they had completed over 90% of the winner's race distance.
^{‡} Half points awarded as less than 75% of race distance completed.
