= Racing Point RP20 =

Formula One racing car

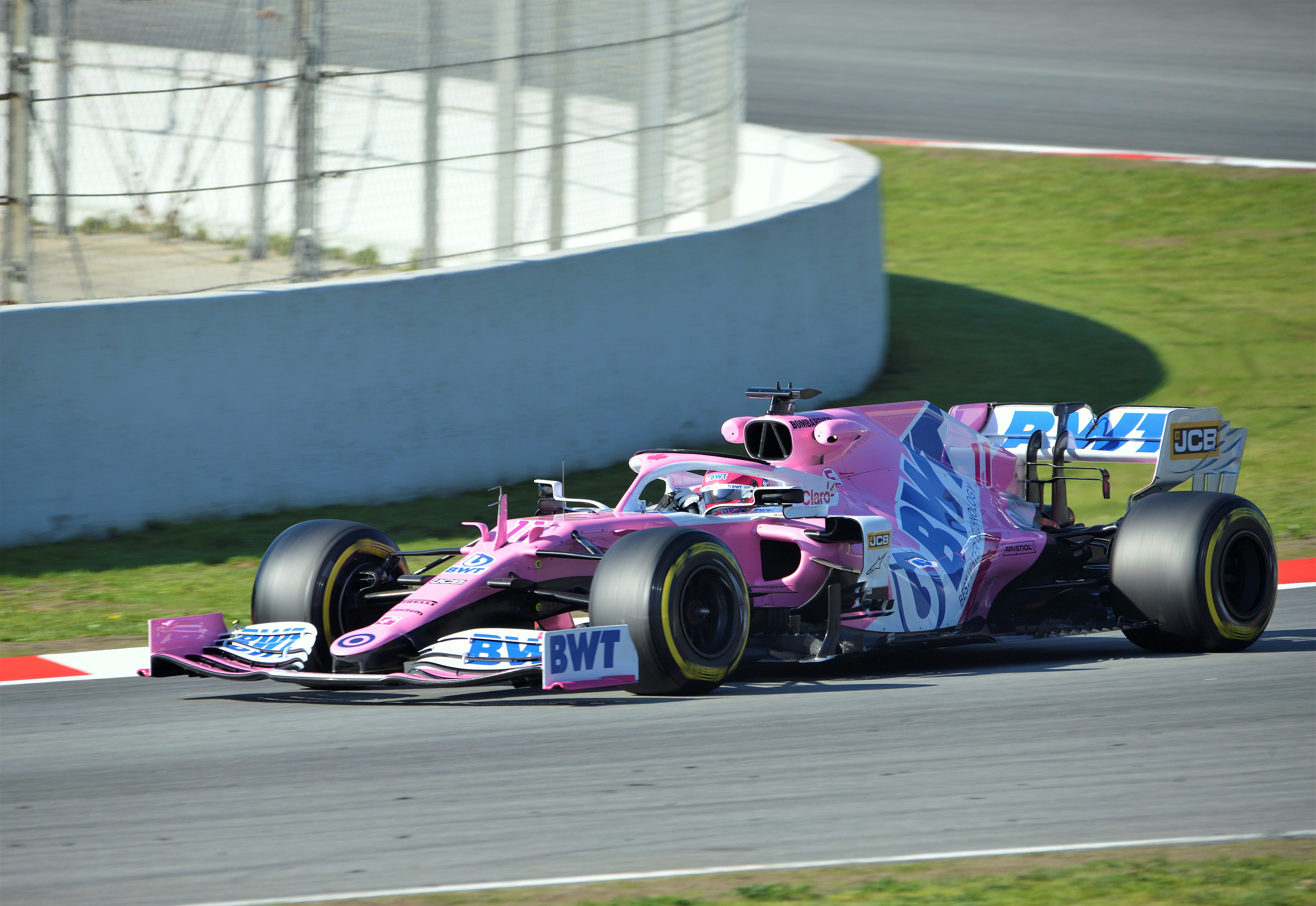
- An RP20 driven by Sergio Pérez during the 2020 Formula One pre-season testing.
- Category: Formula One
- Constructor: Racing Point
- Designers: Andrew Green (Technical Director); Simon Phillips (Director of Aerodynamic Operations & Software); Akio Haga (Chief Designer); Ian Hall (Chief Designer); Bruce Eddington (Head of Design, Composites); Daniel Carpenter (Head of Design, Mechanical); Andrew Brown (Head of R&D); Jonathan Marshall (Head of Vehicle Science); William Worrall (Head of Aerodynamic Performance); Guru Johl (Chief Aerodynamicist); Mark Gardiner (Deputy Chief Aerodynamicist)
- Predecessor: Racing Point RP19
- Successor: Aston Martin AMR21 (as Aston Martin)

Technical specifications
- Engine: Mercedes-AMG F1 M11 EQ Performance (rebadged as BWT Mercedes) 1.6 L (98 cu in) direct injection V6 turbocharged engine limited to 15,000 RPM in a mid-mounted, rear-wheel drive layout
- Fuel: Petronas
- Lubricants: Ravenol
- Tyres: Pirelli P Zero (Dry/Slick); Pirelli Cinturato (Wet/Treaded)

Competition history
- Notable entrants: BWT Racing Point Formula One Team
- Notable drivers: 11. (Mexico) Sergio Pérez; 18. (Canada) Lance Stroll; 27. (Germany) Nico Hülkenberg
- Debut: 2020 Austrian Grand Prix
- First win: 2020 Sakhir Grand Prix
- Last win: 2020 Sakhir Grand Prix
- Last event: 2020 Abu Dhabi Grand Prix
Races	Wins	Podiums	Poles	F/Laps
17	1	4	1	0

The Racing Point RP20 is a Formula One racing car designed and developed by the Racing Point F1 Team, to compete in the 2020 Formula One World Championship. It is the second car built by the team, and was the team's last car to be launched under the Racing Point name, as the team rebranded as Aston Martin for the 2021 Formula One World Championship. The RP20 was driven by Sergio Pérez, Lance Stroll, and Nico Hülkenberg.

The car was planned to make its competitive debut at the 2020 Australian Grand Prix, but this was delayed when most of the races originally planned for 2020 were cancelled or postponed in response to the COVID-19 pandemic.

The RP20 made its debut at the 2020 Austrian Grand Prix. Stroll took the team's first and only pole position under the Racing Point name at the 2020 Turkish Grand Prix, while Pérez secured his maiden race victory and the team's first and only win under the Racing Point name at the 2020 Sakhir Grand Prix. The car faced criticism and was investigated due to its close resemblance to the championship-winning Mercedes W10 run by Mercedes in 2019.

== Background ==
The car passed its crash test in January 2020, which was conducted at Cranfield Impact Centre in Bedfordshire, England, and allowed its homologation with the FIA. Racing Point team principal Otmar Szafnauer described the car as an evolution of its previous contender, owing to the relative lack of change in the regulations for the 2020 season, and that the team had begun work on the car in July 2019, ahead of the mid-season summer break.

== Similarities to the Mercedes W10 ==
=== Pre-season criticism ===
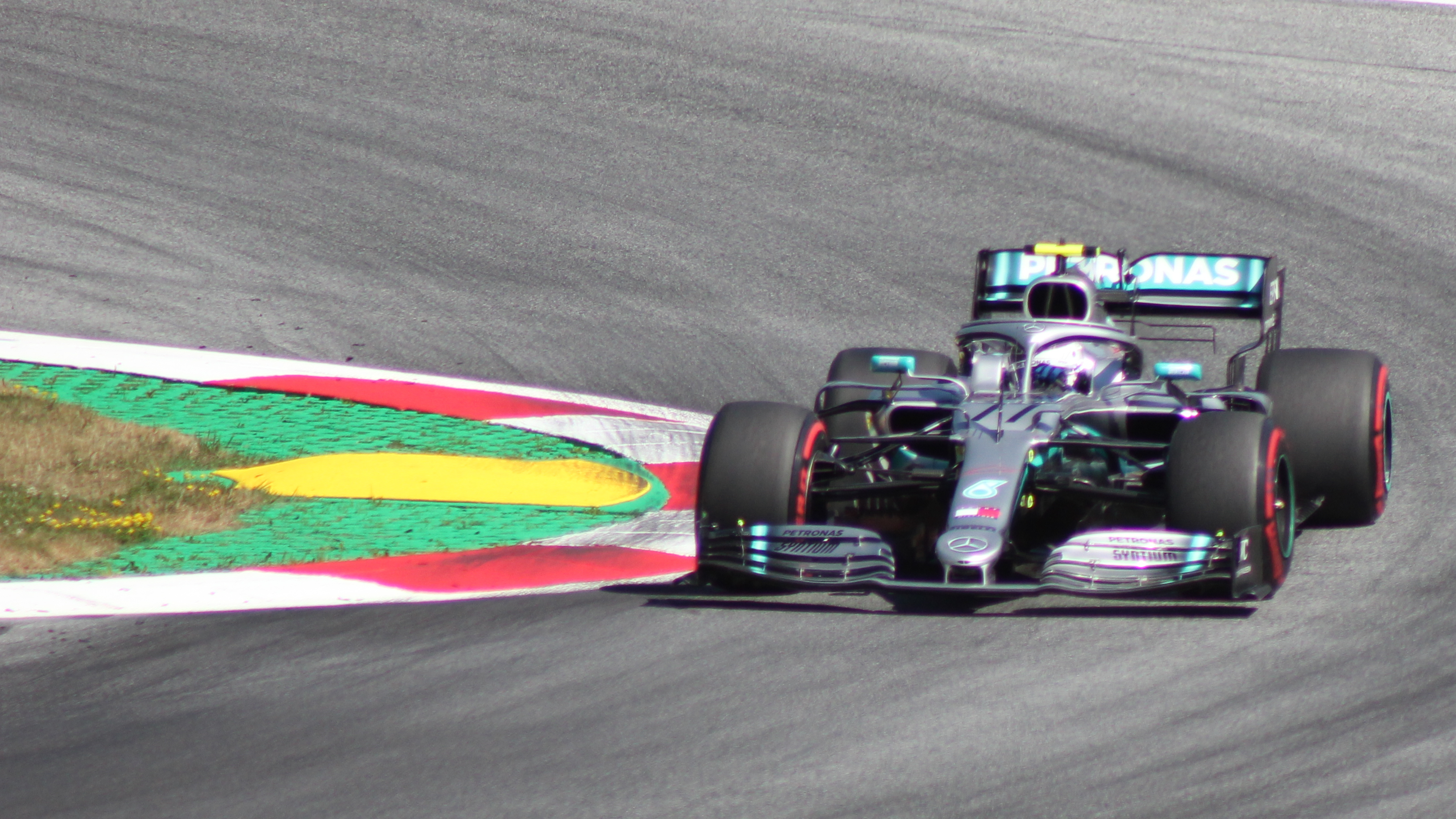
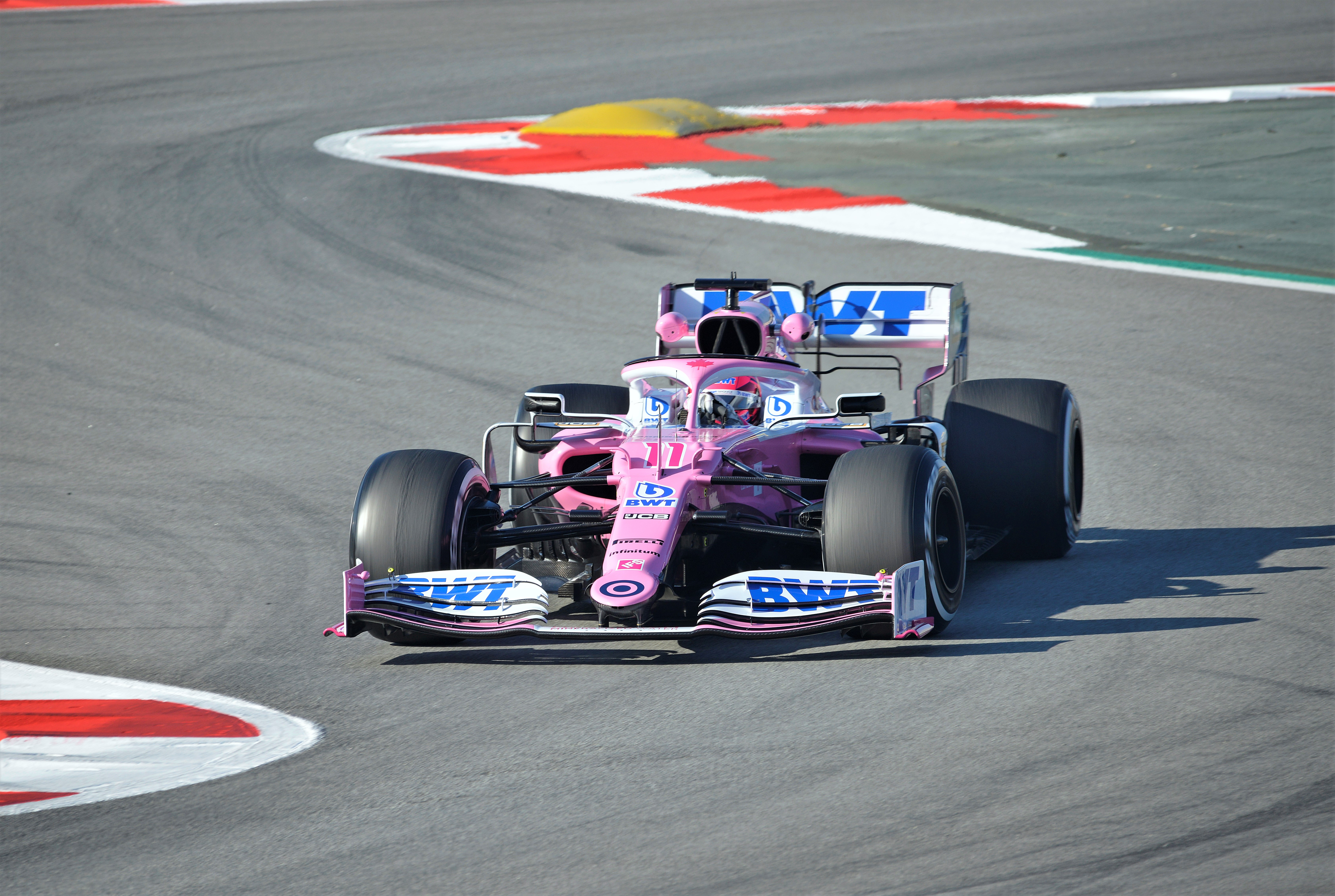
The comparison between Mercedes' W10 from 2019 (left) and the RP20 (right)

During 2020 Formula One pre-season testing the car was nicknamed the "Pink Mercedes" and the team "Tracing Point" due to the RP20's apparent resemblance to the championship-winning Mercedes AMG F1 W10 EQ Power+ used by Mercedes during 2019. Racing Point's technical director Andrew Green stated that the car "shares some resemblances in some areas" but denied that there had been a transfer of designs between the teams. The design caused controversy amongst other teams, with McLaren CEO Zak Brown referring to the RP20 as "what appears to be last year's Mercedes" prior to the season opening Austrian Grand Prix.

=== Protests ===
After the Styrian Grand Prix, Renault lodged a formal protest against the legality of the RP20, suggesting its brake ducts (a part teams must design themselves) may be too similar to the Mercedes W10's. Brake ducts of the RP20 were impounded and stewards requested Mercedes provide brake ducts from the W10 for comparison. Renault also made an identical protest to the results of the Hungarian Grand Prix regarding the RP20's legality. The same protest was repeated by Renault at Silverstone following the British Grand Prix. Ferrari submitted a request for clarification by the FIA on the same grounds as the Renault protest. The FIA upheld the Renault protests, fining Racing Point €400,000 and deducting 15 points from the Constructors' Championship. It stated that while the car complied with the technical regulations, the design process of the rear brake ducts constituted a breach of the sporting regulations. Because Racing Point had based the design of the part on CAD drawings supplied by Mercedes, the FIA viewed Mercedes, not Racing Point, as the designers of the rear brake ducts. However, the design process of the front brake ducts was deemed legal, as the team had used a similar design in 2019, when teams were not required to design brake ducts themselves. The 15-point deduction was ultimately vital in their battle for third place in the Constructors' Championship. Although Racing Point scored the third-highest number of points, the point deduction demoted them to fourth place behind McLaren.

== Season summary ==
Three days before the British Grand Prix, Pérez tested positive for COVID-19. Due to this Pérez was unable to participate in both the British Grand Prix and the 70th Anniversary Grand Prix. Nico Hülkenberg served as a substitute driver for both events.

At the Italian Grand Prix, Stroll finished third and took the team's first ever podium. At the Eifel Grand Prix, Lance Stroll was unable to participate in qualifying and the race due to having tested positive for coronavirus. Hülkenberg would serve as his substitute for the next two sessions, finishing 8th after starting 20th.

At the Turkish Grand Prix, Stroll achieved the team's first ever pole position, with teammate Pérez qualifying third. In the race, Stroll led early into the race but eventually dropped to ninth, while Pérez achieved second place, taking the team's second podium finish. Pérez came close to taking the team's third podium finish in the Bahrain Grand Prix, but a late engine failure in lap 54 forced him to retire. Earlier in the race, Stroll's car was flipped upside down due to a collision with Daniil Kvyat, which meant Bahrain was the first race in which both cars did not score a point in the 2020 season. At the Sakhir Grand Prix, Pérez gave Racing Point their first and only win as a constructor and as a legal entity while Stroll also finished on the podium with his 3rd-place finish. This was the first time any incarnation of the team had won a race since Jordan won the 2003 Brazilian Grand Prix. It was the fifth Grand Prix victory for any incarnation of the team.

== Complete Formula One results ==
(key)

Year	Entrant	Power unit	Tyres	Driver name	Grands Prix																	Points	WCC
2020	BWT Racing Point; F1 Team	BWT Mercedes	P		AUT	STY	HUN	GBR	70A	ESP	BEL	ITA	TUS	RUS	EIF	POR	EMI	TUR	BHR	SKH	ABU	195 (Note: Racing Point were docked 15 points in the constructors championship after a protest held by Renault against the design of their brake ducts being too similar to those on the Mercedes W10.)	4th
2020	BWT Racing Point; F1 Team	BWT Mercedes	P	Sergio Pérez	6	6	7	WD		5	10	10	5	4	4	7	6	2	18†	1	Ret	195	4th
2020	BWT Racing Point; F1 Team	BWT Mercedes	P	Lance Stroll	Ret	7	4	9	6	4	9	3	Ret	Ret	WD	Ret	13	9^{P}	Ret	3	10	195	4th
2020	BWT Racing Point; F1 Team	BWT Mercedes	P	Nico Hülkenberg				DNS	7						8							195	4th

- ^{†} Driver failed to finish the race, but was classified as he had completed over 90% of the winner's race distance.
