= AMR GP =

British motor racing company

Aston Martin Racing GP Limited
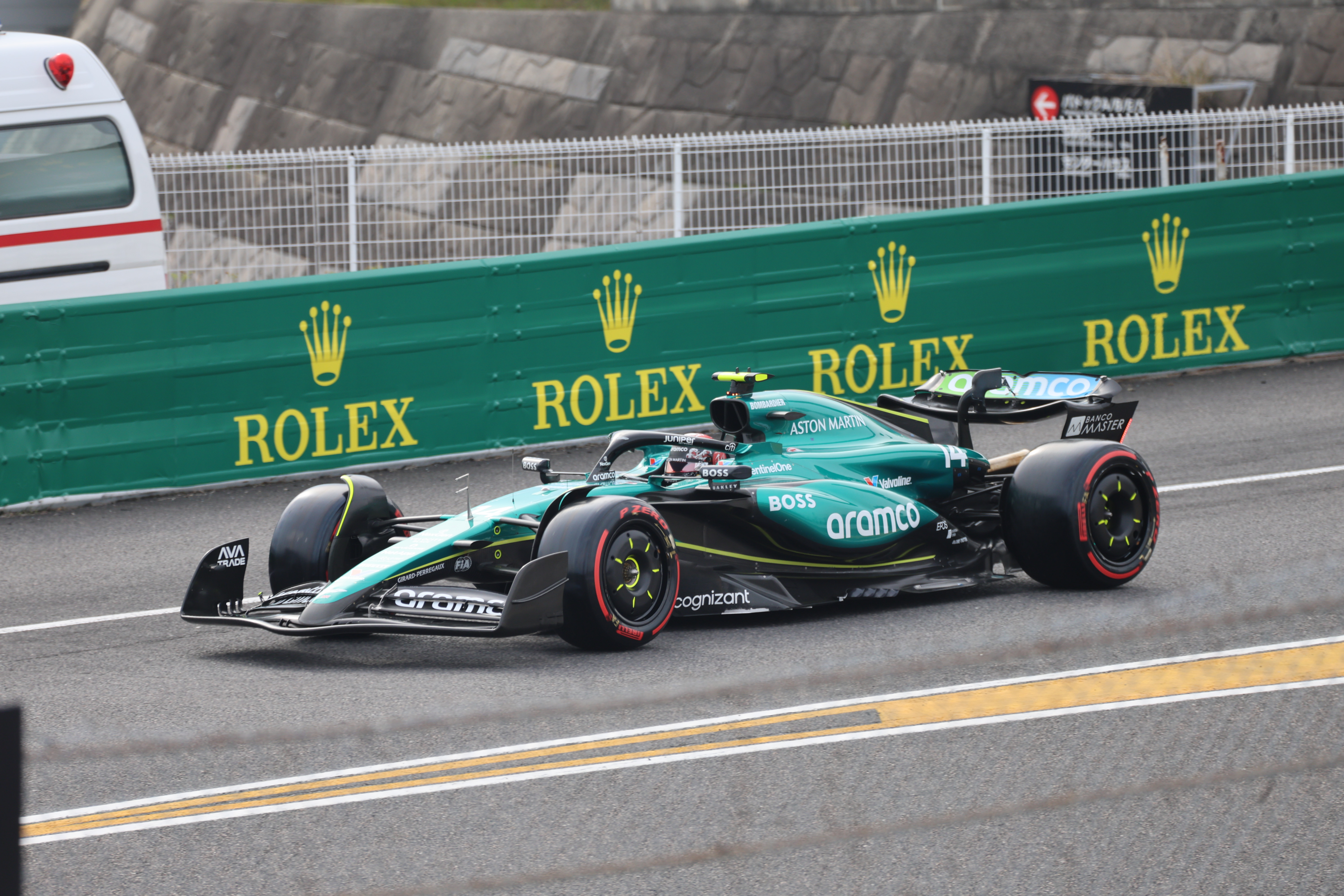
- Trade name: AMR GP Limited
- Formerly: Racing Point UK Limited (2018–2021)
- Type: Private
- Industry: Motor racing
- Founded: 2 August 2018; 8 years ago in the United Kingdom
- Founder: Lawrence Stroll
- Headquarters: Silverstone, England, UK
- Number of employees: 1,000
- Subsidiaries: Racing Point Force India; Racing Point F1 Team; Aston Martin F1 Team

Formula One World Championship career
- First entry: 2018 Belgian Grand Prix
- Last entry: 2026 São Paulo Grand Prix
- Races entered: 181
- Engines: BWT Mercedes, Mercedes, Honda
- Constructors' Championships: 0
- Drivers' Championships: 0
- Race victories: 1
- Podiums: 13
- Points: 922
- Pole positions: 1
- Fastest laps: 3

AMR GP Limited (formerly Racing Point UK Limited from 2018–2021) is a British company that owns and operates the Aston Martin F1 Team, a Formula One racing team based in Silverstone, England.

The company was established on 2 August 2018 to buy the Formula One racing assets of the financially stricken Force India Formula One Team. Following its acquisition of the team assets just before the 2018 Belgian Grand Prix, it competed in that race, and for the rest of the 2018 season, as the Racing Point Force India Formula One Team. For the 2019 season the team was renamed to Racing Point F1 Team until the rebranding of the team into Aston Martin F1 Team in 2021.

== History ==
=== Background ===
On 27 July 2018, the Formula One entrant Force India was placed into administration following team owner Vijay Mallya's legal issues. The Silverstone-based team can trace their origins back to Jordan Grand Prix, founded in 1991. By 2 August, an investment consortium led by Lawrence Stroll, the father of then-Williams driver Lance Stroll, and which included André Desmarais, Jonathan Dudman, John D. Idol, John McCaw Jr., Michael de Picciotto, and Silas Chou, and supported by the team's senior management personnel, had set up a new company, Racing Point UK Limited, to use as a vehicle to save the team. By 23 August, the new company had reached an agreement with the administrators to buy the team's motor racing assets and to secure the jobs of the 400 employees who worked in the team. The new company created a new constructor with the assets and entered the sport prior to the 2018 Belgian Grand Prix, taking the vacated entry of the original Force India team.

The personnel roles remained largely unchanged in the new team, other than that of Bob Fernley, who stood down from his Force India role of deputy team principal, and Otmar Szafnauer who became team principal and CEO after having been chief operating officer with Force India since 2010.

=== Racing Point Force India F1 Team (2018) ===
On 23 August 2018, the F1 governing body, the Fédération Internationale de l'Automobile (FIA) reached an agreement with Racing Point UK that they could take over the Force India 2018 season championship entry, but they would not inherit any of Force India's 59 points or the prize money that they had accrued so far in the season. So, as the Racing Point Force India Formula One Team and using the constructor name Force India, the team entered its first Grand Prix, the 2018 Belgian Grand Prix which took place on 26 August 2018, with zero points.

The original Force India's two drivers, Sergio Pérez and Esteban Ocon, remained with the team and were able to continue their challenge for the drivers' championship, keeping all the points that they had already won in the season.

Racing Point Force India Formula One Team competed in the last nine Grands Prix of the season, amassing 52 points, and finishing seventh overall in the 2018 constructors' championship.

=== Racing Point F1 Team (2019–2020) ===
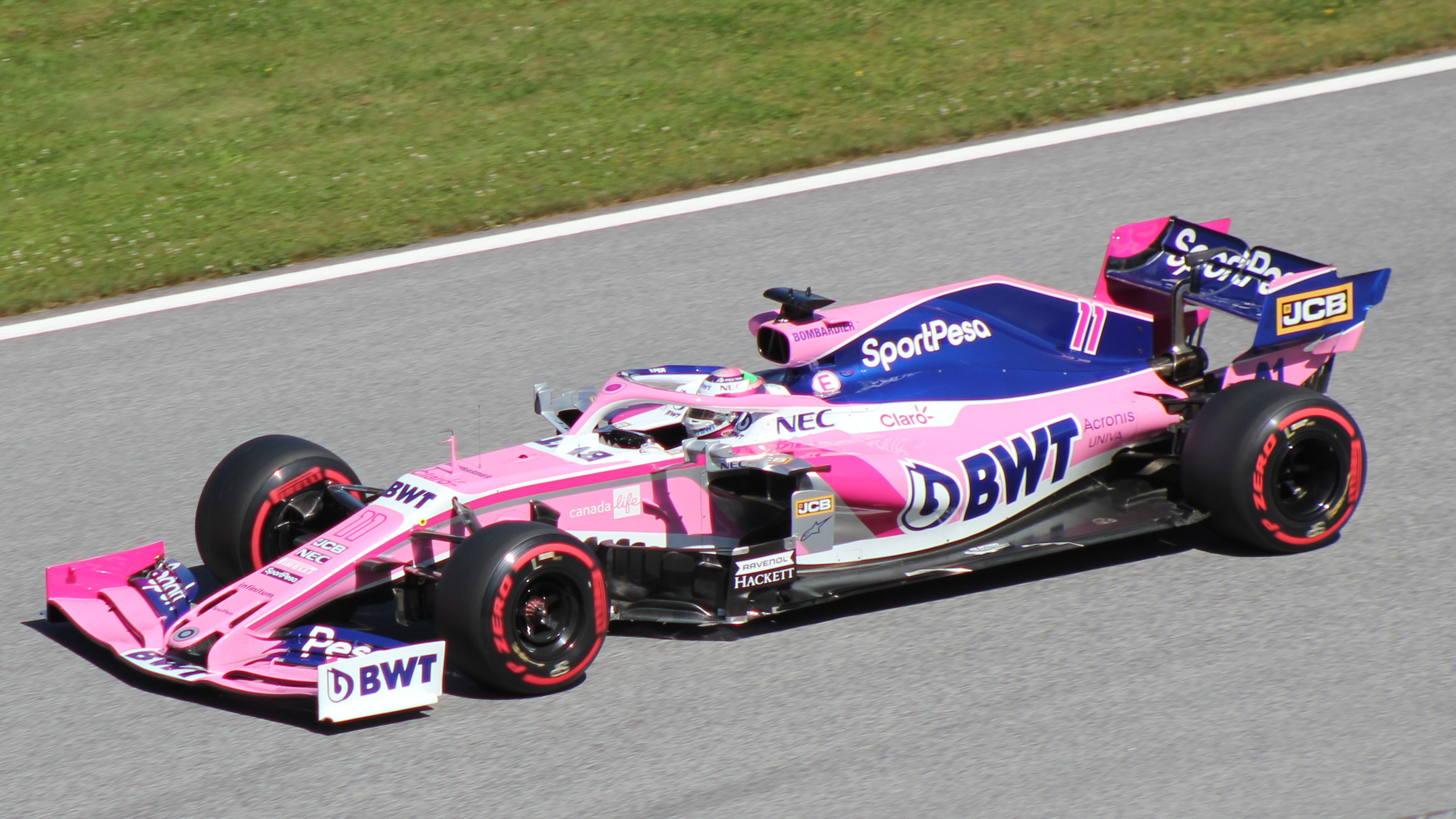
Sergio Pérez at the 2019 Austrian Grand Prix

In November 2018, the company changed the name of its team to Racing Point F1 Team and the constructor name to Racing Point when it registered its 2019 entries with the FIA. SportPesa became the team's title sponsor, and Esteban Ocon was replaced by Lance Stroll in the team's driver lineup. In 2020, BWT became the new title sponsor of the team. At the 2020 Sakhir Grand Prix, Pérez gave Racing Point their first win as a constructor and as a legal entity while Stroll also finished on the podium with his 3rd-place finish. This was the first time any incarnation of the team had won a race since Jordan won the 2003 Brazilian Grand Prix. It was the fifth Grand Prix victory for any incarnation of the team.

=== Aston Martin F1 Team (2021–present) ===
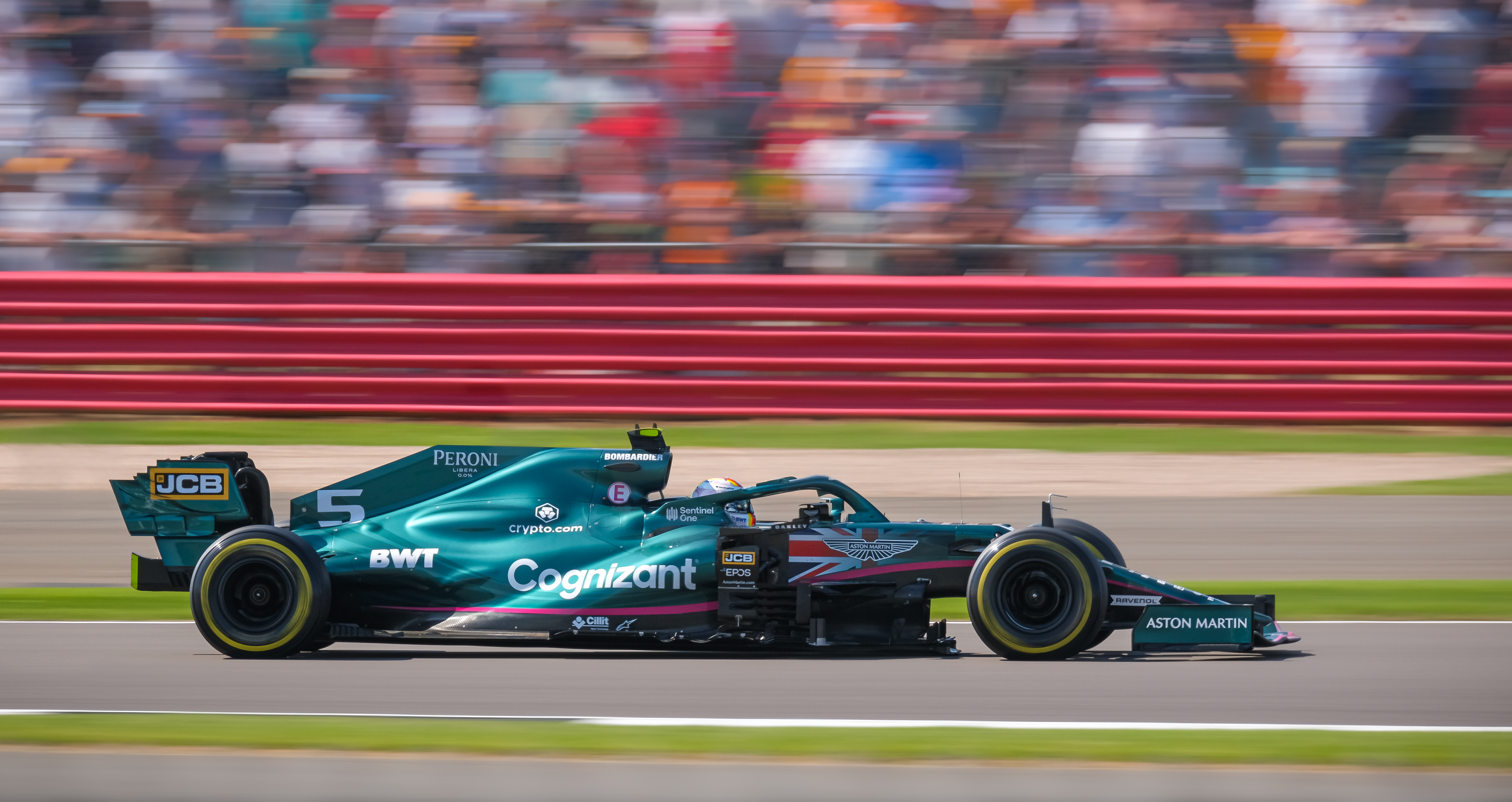
The AMR21 during the 2021 British Grand Prix, driven by Sebastian Vettel

Racing Point UK was renamed AMR GP and entered into the 2021 F1 season through its operation of Aston Martin's Formula One team with Sebastian Vettel and Lance Stroll as their drivers. Vettel replaced Sergio Pérez in the team's driver lineup. As part of the rebrand, the team switched their racing colour of BWT pink to a modern iteration of Aston Martin's British racing green. The Aston Martin AMR21 was unveiled in March 2021 and became Aston Martin's first Formula One car after a 61-year absence from the sport. Vettel earned Aston Martin's first podium by finishing second in the 2021 Azerbaijan Grand Prix.

In January 2022, Team Principal Otmar Szafnauer left after having spent 12 years with the team. Mike Krack, who had previously worked on BMW and Porsche motorsport teams, was announced as his replacement in the same month. Vettel retired following the conclusion of the 2022 season. Fernando Alonso, a former two-time World Champion, is his replacement for 2023 on a multi-year contract. Cognizant became the team's title sponsor in 2021, and Aramco became a joint title sponsor in 2022. In December 2023, Aramco signed a new five-year agreement to become an exclusive title sponsor for the team, while Cognizant would remain as a strategic partner.

Construction on a new 37,000 m^{2} (400,000 sq ft) factory at Aston Martin's Silverstone base began in September 2021. The factory features three interconnected buildings and is based in a 40-acre (16 ha) site directly opposite the Silverstone Circuit. Building One serves as the main building housing the team's design, manufacturing, and marketing resources. Building Two redevelops and repurposes the original factory premises as a central hub with staff amenities and also serves as a logistics centre. Building Two houses the team's wellness centre, auditorium, simulator and heritage facility, while Building Three contains the new wind tunnel. Building One was completed in July 2023 followed by Building Two a year later and Building Three was completed in the first week of November 2024. Commissioning of the wind tunnel was completed by January 2025, and it became operational mid-March before the start of the 2025 season. Aston Martin is the sixth different constructor to operate from the Silverstone base since 1991.

By 2023, the number of staff had grown to 800 employees. In November 2023, private equity firm Arctos Partners acquired a minority stake, based on a valuation of about £1 billion. Adrian Newey, who left Red Bull Racing in May 2024, signed a deal with Aston Martin in September 2024 and joined the team the following March, in time for the 2026 regulations. Newey also became a major shareholder of Aston Martin. In January 2025, Andy Cowell replaced Krack as team principal. Going into 2026, Cowell was moved to the role of chief strategy officer, with Newey becoming team principal. In February 2026, AMR GP secured the perpetual rights to use the name "Aston Martin F1 Team" in Formula One in a £50 million agreement with Aston Martin Lagonda. In August 2026, former United States ambassador to the United Kingdom and New York Jets owner Woody Johnson acquired a minority stake in the team.

== Results ==
=== Formula One ===
Year	Name	Car	Engine	Tyres	No.	Drivers	Points	WCC
Force India
2018	(United Kingdom) Racing Point Force India F1 Team	VJM11	Mercedes-AMG F1 M09 EQ Power+ 1.6 V6 t	P	11. 31.	(Mexico) Sergio Pérez (France) Esteban Ocon	52	7th
Racing Point
2019	(United Kingdom) SportPesa Racing Point F1 Team	RP19	BWT Mercedes 1.6 V6 t	P	11. 18.	(Mexico) Sergio Pérez (Canada) Lance Stroll	73	7th
2020	(United Kingdom) BWT Racing Point F1 Team	RP20	BWT Mercedes 1.6 V6 t	P	11. 18. 27.	(Mexico) Sergio Pérez (Canada) Lance Stroll (Germany) Nico Hülkenberg	195	4th
Aston Martin
2021	(United Kingdom) Aston Martin Cognizant F1 Team	AMR21	Mercedes-AMG F1 M12 E Performance 1.6 V6 t	P	5. 18.	(Germany) Sebastian Vettel (Canada) Lance Stroll	77	7th
2022	(United Kingdom) Aston Martin Aramco Cognizant F1 Team	AMR22	Mercedes-AMG F1 M13 E Performance 1.6 V6 t	P	5. 18. 27.	(Germany) Sebastian Vettel (Canada) Lance Stroll (Germany) Nico Hülkenberg	55	7th
2023	(United Kingdom) Aston Martin Aramco Cognizant F1 Team	AMR23	Mercedes-AMG F1 M14 E Performance 1.6 V6 t	P	14. 18.	(Spain) Fernando Alonso (Canada) Lance Stroll	280	5th
2024	(United Kingdom) Aston Martin Aramco F1 Team	AMR24	Mercedes F1 M15 E Performance 1.6 V6 t	P	14. 18.	(Spain) Fernando Alonso (Canada) Lance Stroll	94	5th
2025	(United Kingdom) Aston Martin Aramco F1 Team	AMR25	Mercedes F1 M16 E Performance 1.6 V6 t	P	14. 18.	(Spain) Fernando Alonso (Canada) Lance Stroll	89	7th
2026	(United Kingdom) Aston Martin Aramco F1 Team	AMR26	Honda RA626H 1.6 V6 t	P	14. 18.	(Spain) Fernando Alonso (Canada) Lance Stroll	7*	10th*

* Season still in progress.
