= 2019 French Grand Prix =

Race 8 of 21 in the 2019 Formula One World Championship
← Previous race	Next race →
- Layout of the Circuit Paul Ricard

Race details
- Date: 23 June 2019
- Official name: Formula 1 Pirelli Grand Prix de France 2019
- Location: Circuit Paul Ricard; Le Castellet, Provence-Alpes-Côte d'Azur, France
- Course: Permanent racing circuit
- Course length: 5.842 km (3.630 miles)
- Distance: 53 laps, 309.690 km (192.432 miles)
- Weather: Clear

Pole position
Driver	(United Kingdom) Lewis Hamilton	Mercedes
- Time: 1:28.319

Fastest lap
Driver	(Germany) Sebastian Vettel	Ferrari
- Time: 1:32.740 on lap 53 (lap record)

Podium
First	(United Kingdom) Lewis Hamilton	Mercedes
Second	(Finland) Valtteri Bottas	Mercedes
Third	(Monaco) Charles Leclerc	Ferrari

The 2019 French Grand Prix (formally known as the Formula 1 Pirelli Grand Prix de France 2019) was a Formula One motor race on 23 June 2019 at the Circuit Paul Ricard in Le Castellet, France. The race was the 8th round of the 2019 FIA Formula One World Championship. It was the 88th running of the French Grand Prix, and the 60th time the event had been included as a round of the Formula One World Championship since the inception of the series in 1950.

The race was won by Mercedes driver Lewis Hamilton ahead of teammate Valtteri Bottas and Ferrari's Charles Leclerc.

== Background ==
=== Entrants ===
The drivers and teams were the same as the season entry list with no additional stand-in drivers for the race. However, Nicholas Latifi drove in the first practice session for Williams.

=== Championship standings before the race ===
Before the race Lewis Hamilton had 162 points and held a 29-point lead over teammate Valtteri Bottas, with Sebastian Vettel third with 100 points, followed by Max Verstappen with 88 points, and then by Vettel's teammate Charles Leclerc in fifth place with 72 points.

In the Constructors' Championship standings, Mercedes led Ferrari with 295 points and had a 123-point lead having won all the previous races in the season so far. Red Bull was third with 124 points and McLaren was fourth with 30 points, just 2 points ahead of Renault with 28 points.

=== Penalties ===
Daniil Kvyat was required to start from the back of the grid as he exceeded his quota of power unit components, using a 4th Internal Combustion Unit (ICE), 3rd Motor Generator Unit-Kinetic (MGU-K), 3rd Energy Store (ES), 3rd Control Electronics (CE), 4th Turbocharger (TC) and 4th Motor Generator Unit-Heat (MGU-H). George Russell was required to start from the back of the grid as he exceeded his quota of power unit components, using a 3rd Energy Store (ES) and 3rd Control Electronics (CE).

=== Circuit changes ===
Following the 2018 race, teams and drivers expressed concerns about the pit lane entry which saw cars enter the lane aimed directly at the Mercedes garage. In response the FIA announced that the pit lane entry would be moved to somewhere between turns 14 and 15 and also announced that the track would be resurfaced.

The FIA also announced that they had moved to clamp down any potential corner cutting ahead of the French Grand Prix weekend at the Circuit Paul Ricard. The nature of the track, which had prominently been used as a test venue in preceding years, meant that there was a lot of runoff for the drivers if they made a mistake. However, there had been bollards and signs placed around the circuit in order to stop the drivers taking advantage of the runoff area, ensuring they would lose time and rejoin the circuit safely. At turn 2, two yellow bollards had appeared along with some red and white signage to indicate where a driver should rejoin the circuit. The event notes state: "Any driver who fails to negotiate Turn 2 by using the track, and who passes completely to the right of the first fluorescent yellow bollard on the apex of the corner, must keep completely to the right of the fluorescent yellow bollard and re-join the track by driving through the two arrays of blocks in the run-off by passing to the right of the first and to the left of the second." A similar system had been enforced further on in the first sector, at turns 3, 4, and 5.

The rules would not strictly apply to free practice sessions, and each case was supposed to be handled and analysed differently depending on the circumstance.

== Free practice ==
Lewis Hamilton set the fastest time in FP1 followed by Valtteri Bottas. The Ferrari drivers were third and fourth, with Charles Leclerc ahead of Sebastian Vettel.

In FP2 it was another Mercedes 1–2 with Bottas leading Hamilton, and then Leclerc leading Vettel in 3–4. Early in the session Hamilton went off the track and joined unsafely, forcing Max Verstappen off the track when he rejoined. Hamilton was later summoned by the stewards but he received no penalty.

== Qualifying ==
=== Qualifying classification ===
Pos.	No.	Driver	Constructor	Qualifying times			Final grid
Pos.	No.	Driver	Constructor	Q1	Q2	Q3	Final grid
1	44	(United Kingdom) Lewis Hamilton	Mercedes	1:30.609	1:29.520	1:28.319	1
2	77	(Finland) Valtteri Bottas	Mercedes	1:30.550	1:29.437	1:28.605	2
3	16	(Monaco) Charles Leclerc	Ferrari	1:30.647	1:29.699	1:28.965	3
4	33	(Netherlands) Max Verstappen	Red Bull Racing-Honda	1:31.327	1:30.099	1:29.409	4
5	4	(United Kingdom) Lando Norris	McLaren-Renault	1:30.989	1:30.019	1:29.418	5
6	55	(Spain) Carlos Sainz Jr.	McLaren-Renault	1:31.073	1:30.319	1:29.522	6
7	5	(Germany) Sebastian Vettel	Ferrari	1:31.075	1:29.506	1:29.799	7
8	3	(Australia) Daniel Ricciardo	Renault	1:30.954	1:30.369	1:29.918	8
9	10	(France) Pierre Gasly	Red Bull Racing-Honda	1:31.152	1:30.421	1:30.184	9
10	99	(Italy) Antonio Giovinazzi	Alfa Romeo Racing-Ferrari	1:31.180	1:30.408	1:33.420	10
11	23	(Thailand) Alexander Albon	Scuderia Toro Rosso-Honda	1:31.445	1:30.461	N/A	11
12	7	(Finland) Kimi Räikkönen	Alfa Romeo Racing-Ferrari	1:30.972	1:30.533	N/A	12
13	27	(Germany) Nico Hülkenberg	Renault	1:30.865	1:30.544	N/A	13
14	11	(Mexico) Sergio Pérez	Racing Point-BWT Mercedes	1:30.964	1:30.738	N/A	14
15	20	(Denmark) Kevin Magnussen	Haas-Ferrari	1:31.166	1:31.440	N/A	15
16	26	(Russia) Daniil Kvyat	Scuderia Toro Rosso-Honda	1:31.564	N/A	N/A	19^{1}
17	8	(France) Romain Grosjean	Haas-Ferrari	1:31.626	N/A	N/A	16
18	18	(Canada) Lance Stroll	Racing Point-BWT Mercedes	1:31.726	N/A	N/A	17
19	63	(United Kingdom) George Russell	Williams-Mercedes	1:32.789	N/A	N/A	20^{1}
20	88	(Poland) Robert Kubica	Williams-Mercedes	1:33.205	N/A	N/A	18
107% time: 1:36.888

Notes

- ^1 – Daniil Kvyat and George Russell were required to start from back of grid for exceeding their quotas of power unit components.

== Race ==
=== Race summary ===
The race began cleanly, with Carlos Sainz Jr. unsuccessfully attempting to overtake Max Verstappen and the two Mercedes cars maintaining their lead. On lap 6, George Russell attempted an overtake on teammate Robert Kubica around the outside of turn 10, but was pushed off-track, destroying a polystyrene distance marker. By the following lap, Sebastian Vettel had overtaken both McLarens to take fifth place.

Antonio Giovinazzi was the first driver to pit, on lap 8, after struggling with degrading soft-compound tyres. On lap 10, Sergio Pérez was handed a 5-second time penalty for leaving the track and gaining an advantage on lap 1. The decision was controversial, since Pérez had correctly passed around the penalty bollard after cutting turn 4 as specified by the race director, but had still overtaken Alexander Albon and Kevin Magnussen to claim 13th place as a result.

Verstappen was the first of the leading pack to pit, on lap 21. Charles Leclerc pitted on the following lap, as did Valtteri Bottas on lap 24, and Lewis Hamilton from the lead on lap 25. Vettel, who was yet to pit, had been far enough behind Hamilton that the Mercedes driver maintained the lead of the race. Vettel pitted on the following lap, emerging behind Verstappen and restoring the order of the top five. Lance Stroll was the final driver to make their first pit-stop; he did so on lap 40.

Romain Grosjean became the first and only retirement of the Grand Prix on lap 45 with an unspecified problem. A virtual safety car was briefly implemented on lap 50 after a bollard had rolled onto the track. Vettel pitted for soft-compound tyres on the penultimate lap in an attempt to claim the fastest lap point, which he did on the final lap of the race.

On the final lap, Lando Norris, who had been suffering from hydraulic problems, was passed by Daniel Ricciardo before turn 8. Ricciardo ran deep into the corner, and forced Norris off the track whilst rejoining it in turn 9. This allowed Kimi Räikkönen and Nico Hülkenberg through, with Räikkönen also getting past Ricciardo. Ricciardo then went off-track on the following straight to overtake the Alfa Romeo for seventh place. Ricciardo was later handed two 5-second penalties after the race, one for rejoining the track unsafely, and one for leaving the track and gaining an advantage. This demoted him to 11th place, outside of the points. The stewards also handed him two penalty points on his Super Licence for "Unsafe rejoining of track" and one point for "Gaining advantage off track".

Lewis Hamilton won the race from pole position ahead of teammate Valtteri Bottas and Charles Leclerc.

=== Race classification ===
Pos.	No.	Driver	Constructor	Laps	Time/Retired	Grid	Points
1	44	(United Kingdom) Lewis Hamilton	Mercedes	53	1:24:31.198	1	25
2	77	(Finland) Valtteri Bottas	Mercedes	53	+18.056	2	18
3	16	(Monaco) Charles Leclerc	Ferrari	53	+18.985	3	15
4	33	(Netherlands) Max Verstappen	Red Bull Racing-Honda	53	+34.905	4	12
5	5	(Germany) Sebastian Vettel	Ferrari	53	+1:02.796	7	11^{1}
6	55	(Spain) Carlos Sainz Jr.	McLaren-Renault	53	+1:35.462	6	8
7	7	(Finland) Kimi Räikkönen	Alfa Romeo Racing-Ferrari	52	+1 lap	12	6
8	27	(Germany) Nico Hülkenberg	Renault	52	+1 lap	13	4
9	4	(United Kingdom) Lando Norris	McLaren-Renault	52	+1 lap	5	2
10	10	(France) Pierre Gasly	Red Bull Racing-Honda	52	+1 lap	9	1
11	3	(Australia) Daniel Ricciardo	Renault	52	+1 lap^{2}	8	
12	11	(Mexico) Sergio Pérez	Racing Point-BWT Mercedes	52	+1 lap	14	
13	18	(Canada) Lance Stroll	Racing Point-BWT Mercedes	52	+1 lap	17	
14	26	(Russia) Daniil Kvyat	Scuderia Toro Rosso-Honda	52	+1 lap	19	
15	23	(Thailand) Alexander Albon	Scuderia Toro Rosso-Honda	52	+1 lap	11	
16	99	(Italy) Antonio Giovinazzi	Alfa Romeo Racing-Ferrari	52	+1 lap	10	
17	20	(Denmark) Kevin Magnussen	Haas-Ferrari	52	+1 lap	15	
18	88	(Poland) Robert Kubica	Williams-Mercedes	51	+2 laps	18	
19	63	(United Kingdom) George Russell	Williams-Mercedes	51	+2 laps	20	
Ret	8	(France) Romain Grosjean	Haas-Ferrari	44	Retired	16	
Fastest lap: (Germany) Sebastian Vettel (Ferrari) – 1:32.740 (lap 53)

Notes

- ^1 – Includes one point for fastest lap.
- ^2 – Daniel Ricciardo finished 7th, but received two 5-second time penalties, the first for gaining an advantage by leaving the track limits and the second for failing to rejoin the track safely.

== Championship standings after the race ==
Drivers' Championship standings

Pos.	Driver	Points
1	(United Kingdom) Lewis Hamilton	187
2	(Finland) Valtteri Bottas	151
3	(Germany) Sebastian Vettel	111
4	(Netherlands) Max Verstappen	100
5	(Monaco) Charles Leclerc	87

Constructors' Championship standings

Pos.	Constructor	Points
1	(Germany) Mercedes	338
2	(Italy) Ferrari	198
3	(Austria) Red Bull Racing-Honda	137
4	(United Kingdom) McLaren-Renault	40
5	(France) Renault	32

- Note: Only the top five positions are included for both sets of standings.

== See also ==
- 2019 Le Castellet Formula 2 round
- 2019 Le Castellet Formula 3 round

Previous race: 2019 Canadian Grand Prix	FIA Formula One World Championship; 2019 season	Next race: 2019 Austrian Grand Prix
Previous race: 2018 French Grand Prix	French Grand Prix	Next race: 2021 French Grand Prix; 2020 edition cancelled
