= 2019 Spanish Grand Prix =

Race 5 of 21 in the 2019 Formula One World Championship
| ← Previous race | Next race → |
- Layout of the Circuit de Barcelona-Catalunya

Race details
- Date: 12 May 2019
- Official name: Formula 1 Emirates Gran Premio de España 2019
- Location: Circuit de Barcelona-Catalunya; Montmeló, Spain
- Course: Permanent racing facility
- Course length: 4.655 km (2.892 miles)
- Distance: 66 laps, 307.104 km (190.825 miles)
- Weather: Sunny
- Attendance: 160,428

Pole position
| Driver | (Finland) Valtteri Bottas | Mercedes |
- Time: 1:15.406

Fastest lap
| Driver | (United Kingdom) Lewis Hamilton | Mercedes |
- Time: 1:18.492 on lap 54

Podium
| First | (United Kingdom) Lewis Hamilton | Mercedes |
| Second | (Finland) Valtteri Bottas | Mercedes |
| Third | (Netherlands) Max Verstappen | Red Bull Racing-Honda |

The 2019 Spanish Grand Prix (formally known as the Formula 1 Emirates Gran Premio de España 2019) was a Formula One motor race that took place on 12 May 2019 at the Circuit de Barcelona-Catalunya in Montmeló, Spain. The race was the 5th round of the 2019 Formula One World Championship and marked the 49th running of the Spanish Grand Prix as a World Championship event since the inaugural season in 1950, and the 29th time that a World Championship round had been held at the Barcelona-Catalunya circuit.

Valtteri Bottas took pole position for the race, ahead of Mercedes teammate Lewis Hamilton and Sebastian Vettel. Hamilton would take the lead on lap one, and would remain there to win the Grand Prix ahead of Bottas, and Max Verstappen. It was Hamilton's third consecutive Spanish Grand Prix victory (and fourth in total), and the fifth consecutive Mercedes 1-2 finish.

== Background ==
=== Entrants ===
The drivers and teams were the same as the season entry list with no additional stand-in drivers for either the race or practice.

=== Penalties ===
Daniel Ricciardo carried forward a three-place grid penalty from the previous race for causing a collision with Daniil Kvyat.

== Qualifying ==
Valtteri Bottas set the fastest time in all three parts of qualifying to take his third consecutive pole of the season.

=== Qualifying classification ===
| Pos. | No. | Driver | Constructor | Qualifying times | | | Final grid |
| Pos. | No. | Driver | Constructor | Q1 | Q2 | Q3 | Final grid |
|---|---|---|---|---|---|---|---|
| 1 | 77 | (Finland) Valtteri Bottas | Mercedes | 1:16.979 | 1:15.924 | 1:15.406 | 1 |
| 2 | 44 | (United Kingdom) Lewis Hamilton | Mercedes | 1:17.292 | 1:16.038 | 1:16.040 | 2 |
| 3 | 5 | (Germany) Sebastian Vettel | Ferrari | 1:17.425 | 1:16.667 | 1:16.272 | 3 |
| 4 | 33 | (Netherlands) Max Verstappen | Red Bull Racing-Honda | 1:17.244 | 1:16.726 | 1:16.357 | 4 |
| 5 | 16 | (Monaco) Charles Leclerc | Ferrari | 1:17.388 | 1:16.714 | 1:16.588 | 5 |
| 6 | 10 | (France) Pierre Gasly | Red Bull Racing-Honda | 1:17.862 | 1:16.932 | 1:16.708 | 6 |
| 7 | 8 | (France) Romain Grosjean | Haas-Ferrari | 1:18.042 | 1:17.066 | 1:16.911 | 7 |
| 8 | 20 | (Denmark) Kevin Magnussen | Haas-Ferrari | 1:17.669 | 1:17.272 | 1:16.922 | 8 |
| 9 | 26 | (Russia) Daniil Kvyat | Scuderia Toro Rosso-Honda | 1:17.914 | 1:17.243 | 1:17.573 | 9 |
| 10 | 3 | (Australia) Daniel Ricciardo | Renault | 1:18.385 | 1:17.299 | 1:18.106 | 13^{a} |
| 11 | 4 | (United Kingdom) Lando Norris | McLaren-Renault | 1:17.611 | 1:17.338 | N/A | 10 |
| 12 | 23 | (Thailand) Alexander Albon | Scuderia Toro Rosso-Honda | 1:17.796 | 1:17.445 | N/A | 11 |
| 13 | 55 | (Spain) Carlos Sainz Jr. | McLaren-Renault | 1:17.760 | 1:17.599 | N/A | 12 |
| 14 | 7 | (Finland) Kimi Räikkönen | Alfa Romeo Racing-Ferrari | 1:18.132 | 1:17.788 | N/A | 14 |
| 15 | 11 | (Mexico) Sergio Pérez | Racing Point-BWT Mercedes | 1:18.286 | 1:17.886 | N/A | 15 |
| 16 | 27 | (Germany) Nico Hülkenberg | Renault | 1:18.404 | N/A | N/A | PL^{b} |
| 17 | 18 | (Canada) Lance Stroll | Racing Point-BWT Mercedes | 1:18.471 | N/A | N/A | 16 |
| 18 | 99 | (Italy) Antonio Giovinazzi | Alfa Romeo Racing-Ferrari | 1:18.664 | N/A | N/A | 18^{c} |
| 19 | 63 | (United Kingdom) George Russell | Williams-Mercedes | 1:19.072 | N/A | N/A | 19^{d} |
| 20 | 88 | (Poland) Robert Kubica | Williams-Mercedes | 1:20.254 | N/A | N/A | 17 |
107% time: 1:22.367

Notes

- ^a – Daniel Ricciardo received a three-place grid penalty for causing a collision at the previous round.
- ^b – Nico Hülkenberg was required to start from the pit lane after changing the specification of his front wing during qualifying and changing brake map parameters. He also was required to start from the rear of the starting grid for changing multiple power unit components.
- ^c – Antonio Giovinazzi received a five-place grid penalty for an unscheduled gearbox change.
- ^d – George Russell received a five-place grid penalty for an unscheduled gearbox change.

== Race ==
Valtteri Bottas started the race from pole position, but his teammate Lewis Hamilton made a slightly better start from second on the grid to take the lead into the first corner. Sebastian Vettel briefly pulled his Ferrari into second around the outside of Turn 1 as Bottas, stuck between Vettel and Hamilton, was forced to yield. However, Vettel promptly ran wide in Turn 1 and allowed Bottas back into second place. Red Bull's Max Verstappen took advantage of the Ferraris' squabbling through the first two turns to move into third place with an overtake around the outside of Vettel in Turn 3, and comfortably held on to the last podium position for the remainder of the race.

While Vettel was ordered by the Ferrari pitwall to allow teammate Charles Leclerc into fourth place in the early running, the two would later switch positions back and Vettel would eventually lead home a Ferrari 4-5 finish. On lap 44, the safety car was brought out by the only retirements of the day, as Racing Point's Lance Stroll and McLaren's Lando Norris collided in Turn 2. The safety car bunched up the field with 22 laps remaining but ultimately did not change the running order among the top 6 drivers, with the most notable result of the safety car being the subsequent battle between the two Haas drivers that saw Kevin Magnussen overtake teammate Romain Grosjean, who subsequently slipped back to 10th place by the end of the race.

Haas would ultimately be the only team outside of the top 3 to score a double points finish, and were joined by 8th placed Carlos Sainz Jr. and 9th placed Daniil Kvyat in the bottom half of the points. Hamilton led his teammate home by just over four seconds, taking his third straight victory in Spain. He also claimed the fastest lap of the race on Lap 54, only missing out on a grand slam by virtue of not starting from pole position. Valtteri Bottas finished in second place, securing Mercedes's fifth consecutive 1–2 finish in 2019 with Max Verstappen finishing in third. The podium of the race was exactly the same as the previous year. Both Ferrari drivers Sebastian Vettel and Charles Leclerc finished in fourth and fifth place respectively.

Dieter Zetche, Mercedes's team managing director for which the race was his last, joined the podium to receive the winning manufacturer's award.

=== Race classification ===
| Pos. | No. | Driver | Constructor | Laps | Time/Retired | Grid | Points |
|---|---|---|---|---|---|---|---|
| 1 | 44 | (United Kingdom) Lewis Hamilton | Mercedes | 66 | 1:35:50.443 | 2 | 26^{1} |
| 2 | 77 | (Finland) Valtteri Bottas | Mercedes | 66 | +4.074 | 1 | 18 |
| 3 | 33 | (Netherlands) Max Verstappen | Red Bull Racing-Honda | 66 | +7.679 | 4 | 15 |
| 4 | 5 | (Germany) Sebastian Vettel | Ferrari | 66 | +9.167 | 3 | 12 |
| 5 | 16 | (Monaco) Charles Leclerc | Ferrari | 66 | +13.361 | 5 | 10 |
| 6 | 10 | (France) Pierre Gasly | Red Bull Racing-Honda | 66 | +19.576 | 6 | 8 |
| 7 | 20 | (Denmark) Kevin Magnussen | Haas-Ferrari | 66 | +28.159 | 8 | 6 |
| 8 | 55 | (Spain) Carlos Sainz Jr. | McLaren-Renault | 66 | +32.342 | 12 | 4 |
| 9 | 26 | (Russia) Daniil Kvyat | Scuderia Toro Rosso-Honda | 66 | +33.056 | 9 | 2 |
| 10 | 8 | (France) Romain Grosjean | Haas-Ferrari | 66 | +34.641 | 7 | 1 |
| 11 | 23 | (Thailand) Alexander Albon | Scuderia Toro Rosso-Honda | 66 | +35.455 | 11 | |
| 12 | 3 | (Australia) Daniel Ricciardo | Renault | 66 | +36.758 | 13 | |
| 13 | 27 | (Germany) Nico Hülkenberg | Renault | 66 | +39.241 | PL | |
| 14 | 7 | (Finland) Kimi Räikkönen | Alfa Romeo Racing-Ferrari | 66 | +41.803 | 14 | |
| 15 | 11 | (Mexico) Sergio Pérez | Racing Point-BWT Mercedes | 66 | +46.877 | 15 | |
| 16 | 99 | (Italy) Antonio Giovinazzi | Alfa Romeo Racing-Ferrari | 66 | +47.691 | 18 | |
| 17 | 63 | (United Kingdom) George Russell | Williams-Mercedes | 65 | +1 lap | 19 | |
| 18 | 88 | (Poland) Robert Kubica | Williams-Mercedes | 65 | +1 lap | 17 | |
| Ret | 18 | (Canada) Lance Stroll | Racing Point-BWT Mercedes | 44 | Collision | 16 | |
| Ret | 4 | (United Kingdom) Lando Norris | McLaren-Renault | 44 | Collision | 10 | |
Fastest lap: (United Kingdom) Lewis Hamilton (Mercedes) – 1:18.492 (lap 54)

Notes

- ^1 – Includes one point for the fastest lap.

== Championship standings after the race ==
Drivers' Championship standings

| | Pos. | Driver | Points |
|---|---|---|---|
| 1 | 1 | (United Kingdom) Lewis Hamilton | 112 |
| 1 | 2 | (Finland) Valtteri Bottas | 105 |
| 1 | 3 | (Netherlands) Max Verstappen | 66 |
| 1 | 4 | (Germany) Sebastian Vettel | 64 |
| | 5 | (Monaco) Charles Leclerc | 57 |

Constructors' Championship standings

| Pos. | Constructor | Points |
|---|---|---|
| 1 | (Germany) Mercedes | 217 |
| 2 | (Italy) Ferrari | 121 |
| 3 | (Austria) Red Bull Racing-Honda | 87 |
| 4 | (United Kingdom) McLaren-Renault | 22 |
| 5 | (United Kingdom) Racing Point-BWT Mercedes | 17 |

- Note: Only the top five positions are included for both sets of standings.

== See also ==
- 2019 Barcelona Formula 2 round
- 2019 Barcelona Formula 3 round

| Previous race: 2019 Azerbaijan Grand Prix | FIA Formula One World Championship; 2019 season | Next race: 2019 Monaco Grand Prix |
| Previous race: 2018 Spanish Grand Prix | Spanish Grand Prix | Next race: 2020 Spanish Grand Prix |
