= 2019 Azerbaijan Grand Prix =

Formula One motor race in Baku, Azerbaijan

Race 4 of 21 in the 2019 Formula One World Championship
← Previous race	Next race →
- Layout of the Baku City Circuit

Race details
- Date: 28 April 2019
- Official name: Formula 1 SOCAR Azerbaijan Grand Prix 2019
- Location: Baku City Circuit; Baku, Azerbaijan
- Course: Temporary street circuit
- Course length: 6.003 km (3.730 miles)
- Distance: 51 laps, 306.049 km (190.170 miles)
- Weather: Mostly sunny
- Attendance: 85,000

Pole position
Driver	(Finland) Valtteri Bottas	Mercedes
- Time: 1:40.495

Fastest lap
Driver	(Monaco) Charles Leclerc	Ferrari
- Time: 1:43.009 on lap 50 (lap record)

Podium
First	(Finland) Valtteri Bottas	Mercedes
Second	(United Kingdom) Lewis Hamilton	Mercedes
Third	(Germany) Sebastian Vettel	Ferrari

The 2019 Azerbaijan Grand Prix (formally known as the Formula 1 SOCAR Azerbaijan Grand Prix 2019) was a Formula One motor race that took place on 28 April 2019 at the Baku City Circuit in Baku, Azerbaijan. The race was the 4th round of the 2019 Formula One World Championship, marked the 3rd time that the Azerbaijan Grand Prix had been run as a World Championship round, and the 4th time that the Baku circuit has been part of the Formula One World Championship (the 2016 race was run as the European Grand Prix).

After setting the pace early in the weekend, Ferrari were beaten to pole position by Mercedes' Valtteri Bottas, who converted it to a win ahead of teammate Lewis Hamilton to retake a one-point lead in the Drivers' Championship.

== Background ==
=== Championship standings before the race ===
Heading into the race Lewis Hamilton held a 6-point advantage in the Drivers' Championship over Valtteri Bottas with Mercedes holding a 57-point advantage over Ferrari in the Constructors' Championship.

=== Entrants ===
The drivers and teams were the same as the season entry list with no additional stand in drivers for either the race or practice.

=== Penalties ===
In the lead up to the weekend it was announced that Alfa Romeo driver Antonio Giovinazzi would be receiving new control electronics for the Grand Prix. As this was his third set of control electronics he was given a 10 place grid penalty.

== Free practice ==
The first practice session ended after only 12 minutes (the session was scheduled for 90) after the Williams car driven by George Russell was badly damaged when it hit a loose drain cover. The cover, between turns two and three, appeared to be loosened when Charles Leclerc's Ferrari passed over it earlier. The truck towing Russell's car back to the pit lane then hit a pedestrian bridge, leaking hydraulic fluid onto the track and Russell's car. As a result of these two incidents, race director Michael Masi cancelled the session, in order to check the other manholes on the circuit and to check the damage to the pedestrian bridge. Williams determined Russell's chassis needed replacing meaning he would not be allowed to run in the second practice session. The session therefore ended with only the two Ferraris setting lap times with Charles Leclerc ahead of Sebastian Vettel.

The first major incident of second practice was Lance Stroll crashing 15 minutes into the session at turn 2. Daniil Kvyat also crashed at turn 7 with 25 minutes to go. At the end of the session Pierre Gasly was instructed visually to bring the car to be weighed, however he missed the visual cue and continued to his garage where the mechanics performed work on the car, changing the tyres in a practice pit-stop. This was against the rules and as a result Gasly was forced to start the race from the pit lane. The session ended with the Ferrari of Charles Leclerc fastest followed by his teammate Sebastian Vettel.

Third practice passed without incident with Charles Leclerc finishing the session fastest ahead of Sebastian Vettel.

== Qualifying ==
The first qualifying session ended when Robert Kubica's Williams crashed into the wall. During the session, Pierre Gasly had set the fastest lap ahead of Charles Leclerc and Lewis Hamilton. Nico Hülkenberg, Romain Grosjean, Lance Stroll, George Russell, and Robert Kubica were eliminated.

In the second qualifying session, Charles Leclerc crashed exactly into the same wall Kubica had crashed earlier, ending his session and leading him to quote "I am stupid." During the session, Max Verstappen had set the fastest lap, followed by Valtteri Bottas and Lewis Hamilton. Carlos Sainz, Daniel Ricciardo, Alexander Albon, Kevin Magnussen, and Pierre Gasly were eliminated in Q2.

The third qualifying session ended without any incidents, Valtteri Bottas took pole position after setting a lap time of 1:40.495, beating his teammate Lewis Hamilton by 59 thousandths of a second. Sebastian Vettel qualified third, 0.243 seconds behind Hamilton. The remaining drivers consisted of, in qualifying order, Max Verstappen, Sergio Pérez, Daniil Kvyat, Lando Norris, Antonio Giovinazzi, and Charles Leclerc who did not set a time due to his crash in the previous session.

Robert Kubica, Kimi Räikkönen, and Pierre Gasly were required to start from the pitlane due to suspension changes, a failed front wing deflection test, and for exceeding the 100 kg/h fuel flow limit.

=== Qualifying classification ===
Pos.	No.	Driver	Constructor	Qualifying times			Final grid
Pos.	No.	Driver	Constructor	Q1	Q2	Q3	Final grid
1	77	(Finland) Valtteri Bottas	Mercedes	1:42.026	1:41.500	1:40.495	1
2	44	(United Kingdom) Lewis Hamilton	Mercedes	1:41.614	1:41.580	1:40.554	2
3	5	(Germany) Sebastian Vettel	Ferrari	1:42.042	1:41.889	1:40.797	3
4	33	(Netherlands) Max Verstappen	Red Bull Racing-Honda	1:41.727	1:41.388	1:41.069	4
5	11	(Mexico) Sergio Pérez	Racing Point-BWT Mercedes	1:42.249	1:41.870	1:41.593	5
6	26	(Russia) Daniil Kvyat	Scuderia Toro Rosso-Honda	1:42.324	1:42.221	1:41.681	6
7	4	(United Kingdom) Lando Norris	McLaren-Renault	1:42.371	1:42.084	1:41.886	7
8	99	(Italy) Antonio Giovinazzi	Alfa Romeo Racing-Ferrari	1:42.140	1:42.381	1:42.424	17^{1}
9	16	(Monaco) Charles Leclerc	Ferrari	1:41.426	1:41.995	No time	8
10	55	(Spain) Carlos Sainz Jr.	McLaren-Renault	1:41.936	1:42.398	N/A	9
11	3	(Australia) Daniel Ricciardo	Renault	1:42.486	1:42.477	N/A	10
12	23	(Thailand) Alexander Albon	Scuderia Toro Rosso-Honda	1:42.154	1:42.494	N/A	11
13	20	(Denmark) Kevin Magnussen	Haas-Ferrari	1:42.382	1:42.699	N/A	12
14	18	(Canada) Lance Stroll	Racing Point-BWT Mercedes	1:42.630	N/A	N/A	13
15	8	(France) Romain Grosjean	Haas-Ferrari	1:43.407	N/A	N/A	14
16	27	(Germany) Nico Hülkenberg	Renault	1:43.427	N/A	N/A	15
17	63	(United Kingdom) George Russell	Williams-Mercedes	1:45.062	N/A	N/A	16
18	88	(Poland) Robert Kubica	Williams-Mercedes	1:45.455	N/A	N/A	PL^{2}
107% time: 1:48.428
EX^{3}	7	(Finland) Kimi Räikkönen	Alfa Romeo Racing-Ferrari	1:42.059	1:42.082	1:43.068	PL
EX^{4}	10	(France) Pierre Gasly	Red Bull Racing-Honda	1:41.335	No time	N/A	PL

Notes

- ^1 – Antonio Giovinazzi received a ten-place grid penalty for using a third control electronics in his power unit.
- ^2 – Robert Kubica was required to start from the pit lane after making suspension changes to his car.
- ^3 – Kimi Räikkönen was excluded from qualifying after his car failed a front wing deflection test. He was permitted to race at the stewards' discretion and was required to start from the pit lane after adjusting his front wing.
- ^4 – Pierre Gasly was excluded from qualifying for exceeding the 100 kg/h fuel flow limit during qualifying. He was permitted to race at the stewards' discretion and was required to start the race from the pit lane after failing to appear at the weighbridge when summoned during Free Practice 2 and changing standard electronic control unit parameters before the race. He also received a five-place grid penalty for an unscheduled gearbox change.

== Race ==
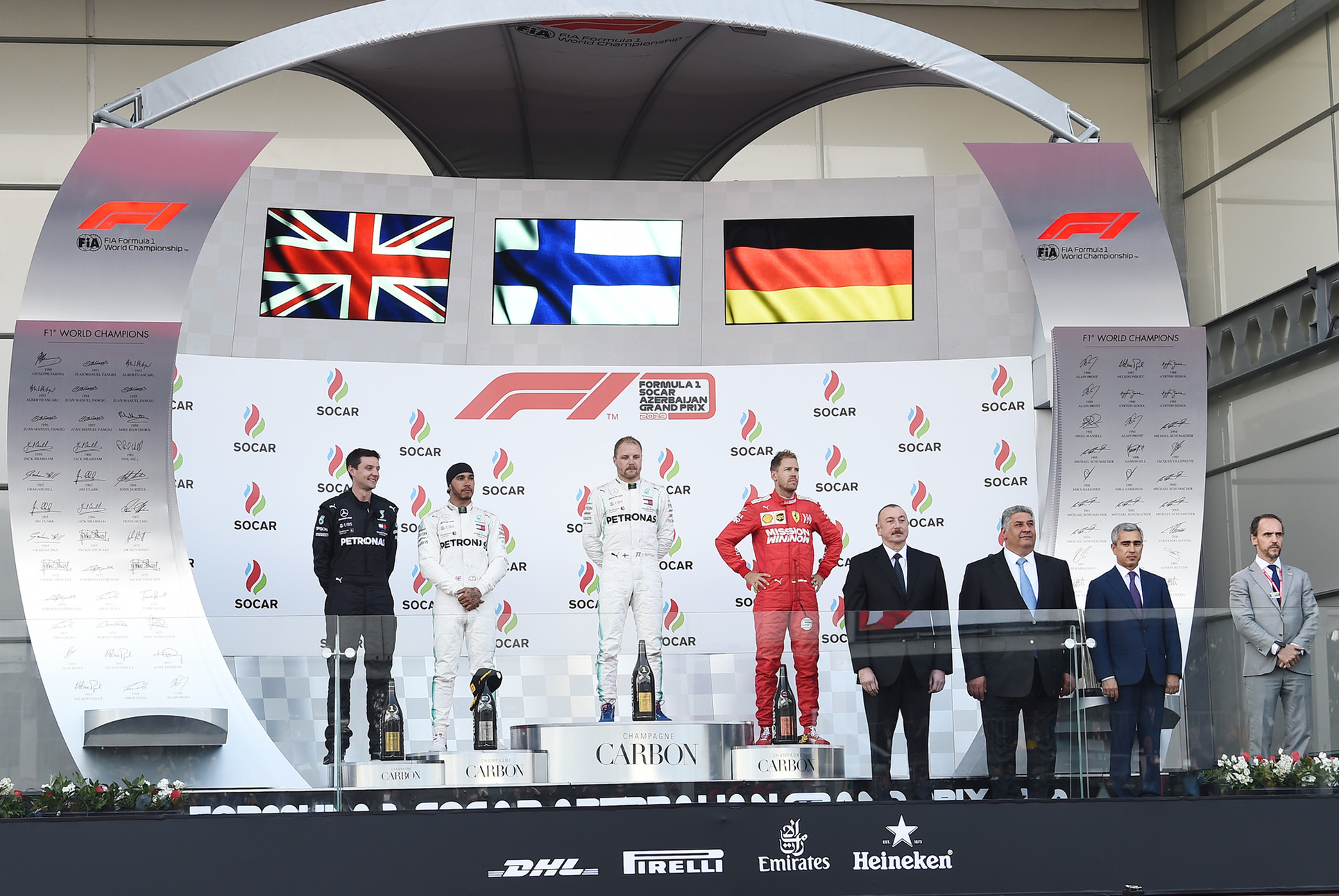
The podium ceremony

The opening lap occurred without any accidents or incidents. Lewis Hamilton initially challenged Valtteri Bottas for the lead taking the inside line from his teammate into turns 1 and 2. Bottas retained his lead on the outside of both corners and had extended it by the end of the lap. Max Verstappen lost 4th place to Sergio Pérez whilst Charles Leclerc fell from 8th to 10th after being overtaken by Carlos Sainz Jr. and Daniel Ricciardo.

Verstappen recovered 4th place on lap 6 and Leclerc passed Pérez to take 5th on the following lap. Leclerc then overtook Verstappen on the pit straight at the end of lap 9. Sebastian Vettel was the first of the front-runners to make a pit stop at the end of lap 11 entering in 3rd place and emerging in 5th. Race leader Bottas made his stop on the following lap exiting the pits in 4th place ahead of Vettel. Hamilton, who had inherited the lead, made his pit stop a lap later emerging in 4th place behind his teammate and handing the race lead to Leclerc.

On lap 14 Robert Kubica was issued with a drive-through penalty. The stewards found that Williams had released Kubica into the pit lane nine minutes earlier than permitted before the start of the race, a rule the team were not aware of. Verstappen made his pit stop from 2nd place at the end of the same lap emerging from the pits in 6th behind teammate Pierre Gasly who was yet to stop. Verstappen later passed Gasly on lap 17. On lap 25 Romain Grosjean locked up his brakes at turn 15 and went up the escape road before rejoining the track dropping him from 11th down to 15th place. On lap 31 Bottas retook the lead of the race from Leclerc who was still yet to make his pit stop.

Shortly afterwards an incident occurred between Daniil Kvyat and Daniel Ricciardo, who were running in 10th and 11th respectively, at turn 3. Ricciardo attempted an overtake on Kvyat on the inside of the corner but locked up his brakes sending him down the escape road. Kvyat was forced to miss the corner to avoid turning into the Renault and came to a stop before his car hit the wall. Ricciardo then reversed into Kvyat whilst attempting to rejoin the track causing damage to both cars which was sufficient to retire them from the race. Both cars were able to return to the pits avoiding the need for a safety car.

By lap 34 Leclerc had been passed by Hamilton and Vettel as his tyres degraded. He made his pit stop at the end of the lap emerging in 6th place behind Pierre Gasly and almost 20 seconds behind Verstappen after having been ahead of both Red Bulls before Verstappen's first stop. A lap later Leclerc made it past Gasly to take 5th. The order of the top five was now Bottas, Hamilton, Vettel, Verstappen and Leclerc. Lap 39 saw both Gasly and Grosjean retire from the race with driveshaft and brake issues respectively, this marked Grosjean's third retirement in four races. Grosjean made it back to the pits but Gasly pulled into an escape road causing a brief virtual safety car whilst his Red Bull was recovered.

Valtteri Bottas crossed the line to take his fifth career victory. Lewis Hamilton finished in second place securing Mercedes' fourth consecutive one-two finish of the season with Sebastian Vettel taking third place. Charles Leclerc set the fastest lap and was awarded Driver of the Day. After the race Ricciardo was issued with a three-place grid penalty for the following race in Spain for causing the accident with Kvyat. Ricciardo stated that his reversing manoeuvre was "just a sense of urgency and a bit of panic" and that he was not aware of the Toro Rosso behind him. Kvyat responded by saying "These things happen, it's racing" and that he would "buy [Ricciardo] a rear view mirror for the next race!"

=== Race classification ===
Pos.	No.	Driver	Constructor	Laps	Time/Retired	Grid	Points
1	77	(Finland) Valtteri Bottas	Mercedes	51	1:31:52.942	1	25
2	44	(United Kingdom) Lewis Hamilton	Mercedes	51	+1.524	2	18
3	5	(Germany) Sebastian Vettel	Ferrari	51	+11.739	3	15
4	33	(Netherlands) Max Verstappen	Red Bull Racing-Honda	51	+17.493	4	12
5	16	(Monaco) Charles Leclerc	Ferrari	51	+1:09.107	8	11^{1}
6	11	(Mexico) Sergio Pérez	Racing Point-BWT Mercedes	51	+1:16.416	5	8
7	55	(Spain) Carlos Sainz Jr.	McLaren-Renault	51	+1:23.826	9	6
8	4	(United Kingdom) Lando Norris	McLaren-Renault	51	+1:40.268	7	4
9	18	(Canada) Lance Stroll	Racing Point-BWT Mercedes	51	+1:43.816	13	2
10	7	(Finland) Kimi Räikkönen	Alfa Romeo Racing-Ferrari	50	+1 lap	PL	1
11	23	(Thailand) Alexander Albon	Scuderia Toro Rosso-Honda	50	+1 lap	11	
12	99	(Italy) Antonio Giovinazzi	Alfa Romeo Racing-Ferrari	50	+1 lap	17	
13	20	(Denmark) Kevin Magnussen	Haas-Ferrari	50	+1 lap	12	
14	27	(Germany) Nico Hülkenberg	Renault	50	+1 lap	15	
15	63	(United Kingdom) George Russell	Williams-Mercedes	49	+2 laps	16	
16	88	(Poland) Robert Kubica	Williams-Mercedes	49	+2 laps	PL	
Ret	10	(France) Pierre Gasly	Red Bull Racing-Honda	38	Driveshaft	PL	
Ret	8	(France) Romain Grosjean	Haas-Ferrari	38	Brakes	14	
Ret	26	(Russia) Daniil Kvyat	Scuderia Toro Rosso-Honda	33	Collision damage	6	
Ret	3	(Australia) Daniel Ricciardo	Renault	31	Collision damage	10	
Fastest lap: (Monaco) Charles Leclerc (Ferrari) — 1:43.009 (lap 50)

Notes

- ^1 – Includes one point for the fastest lap.

== Championship standings after the race ==
Drivers' Championship standings

	Pos.	Driver	Points
1	1	(Finland) Valtteri Bottas	87
1	2	(United Kingdom) Lewis Hamilton	86
1	3	(Germany) Sebastian Vettel	52
1	4	(Netherlands) Max Verstappen	51
	5	(Monaco) Charles Leclerc	47

Constructors' Championship standings

	Pos.	Constructor	Points
	1	(Germany) Mercedes	173
	2	(Italy) Ferrari	99
	3	(Austria) Red Bull Racing-Honda	64
3	4	(United Kingdom) McLaren-Renault	18
3	5	(United Kingdom) Racing Point-BWT Mercedes	17

- Note: Only the top five positions are included for both sets of standings.

== See also ==
- 2019 Baku Formula 2 round

Previous race: 2019 Chinese Grand Prix	FIA Formula One World Championship; 2019 season	Next race: 2019 Spanish Grand Prix
Previous race: 2018 Azerbaijan Grand Prix	Azerbaijan Grand Prix	Next race: 2021 Azerbaijan Grand Prix
