= Racing Point Force India =

Former British Formula One team

Force India
- Full name: Racing Point Force India Formula One Team
- Base: Silverstone, United Kingdom
- Founder(s): Lawrence Stroll
- Noted staff: Steve Curnow; Andrew Green; Andy Stevenson; Otmar Szafnauer
- Noted drivers: (France) Esteban Ocon (Mexico) Sergio Pérez
- Previous name: Sahara Force India
- Next name: Racing Point F1 Team

Formula One World Championship career
- First entry: 2018 Belgian Grand Prix
- Races entered: 9
- Engines: BWT Mercedes
- Constructors' Championships: 0 (best finish: 7th)
- Drivers' Championships: 0 (best finish: 8th, by Sergio Pérez)
- Race victories: 0 (best finish: 5th, 2018 Belgian Grand Prix)
- Podiums: 0
- Points: 52
- Pole positions: 0 (best grid position: 3rd, 2018 Belgian Grand Prix)
- Fastest laps: 0
- 2018 position: 7th
- Final entry: 2018 Abu Dhabi Grand Prix

Racing Point Force India Formula One Team was the title under which Racing Point UK made a late entry into the 2018 Formula One World Championship. The team used the constructor name "Force India", competed under a British licence and was based in Silverstone, United Kingdom.

The team was formed in August 2018 when investors purchased the assets of Sahara Force India F1 team, which was operating under administration. The consortium of investors included André Desmarais, Jonathan Dudman, John D. Idol, John McCaw Jr., Michael de Picciotto and Silas Chou named Racing Point UK Ltd. and were led by Lawrence Stroll, the father of then-Williams F1 driver Lance Stroll. The team made its competitive debut at the 2018 Belgian Grand Prix.

The team was renamed in February 2019 as Racing Point F1 Team.

== History ==
=== Background ===
On 27 July 2018, Force India Formula One Team Limited, the operator of Force India Formula One Team for eleven seasons, was put into administration. By 2 August 2018 its assets were purchased by Racing Point UK Limited, a company created by a group of investors led by Lawrence Stroll. The new company created a new constructor with the assets and entered the sport prior to the 2018 Belgian Grand Prix, taking the vacated entry of the original Force India team.

In December 2018, the FIA's first release of the 2019 Formula One World Championship entry list confirmed that Racing Point intended to drop the Force India name, and would contest the 2019 championship as a new constructor named Racing Point F1 Team.

=== 2018 season ===
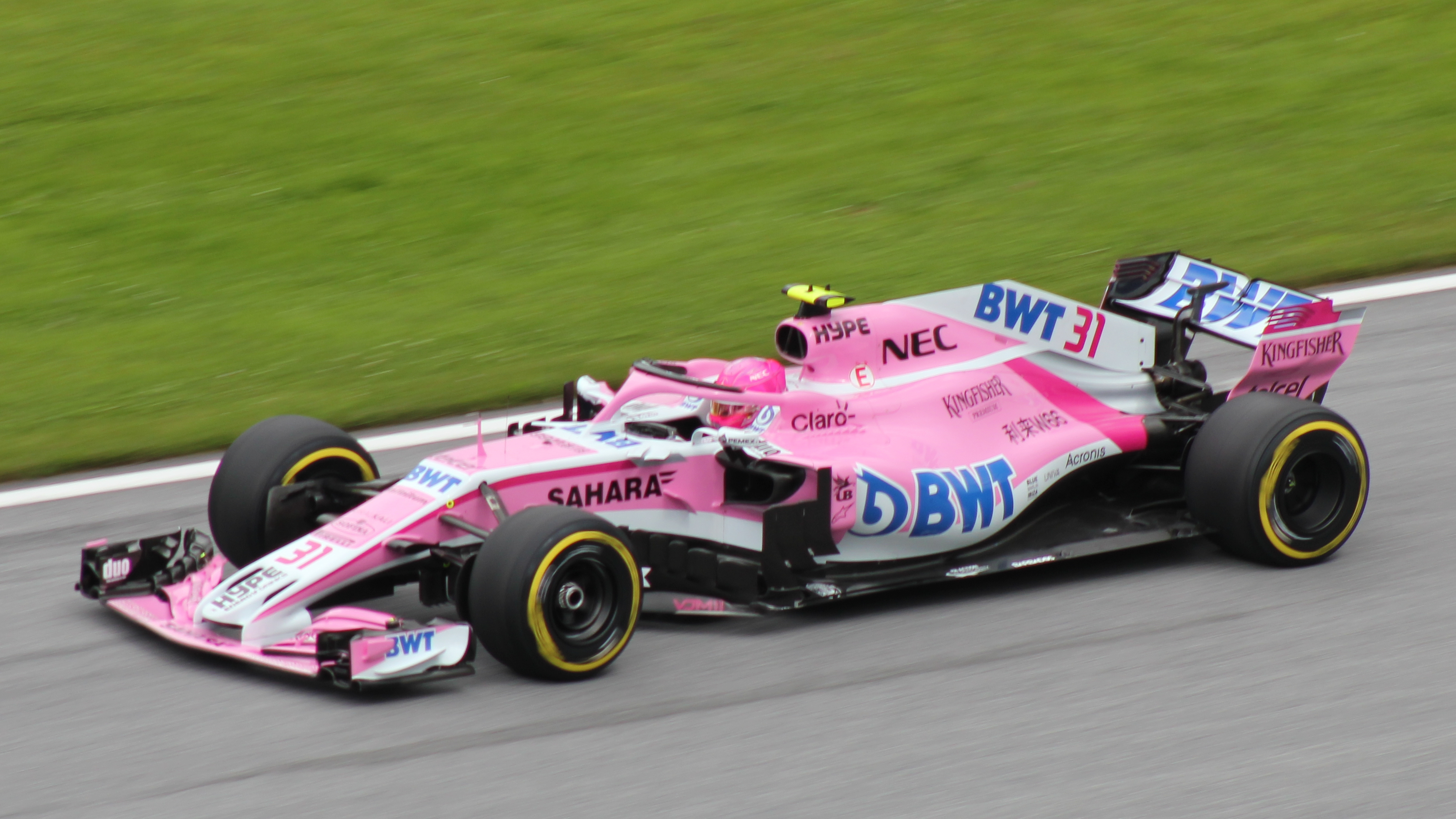
Esteban Ocon driving the car

In the build-up to the 2018 Belgian Grand Prix, the team was unsure if they would be able to race as the consortium that won the bid to buy Force India team had to get the approval of 13 Indian banks that had financial claims on the team. The full approval arrived after the deadline, so the consortium purchased the old team's assets rather than buy the team itself. The newly-formed team then had to apply for participation in the Formula One World Championship under a new name while retaining the chassis name as part of the new constructor name – thus resulting in the adding of "Racing Point" to the "Force India" chassis constructor's name. The FIA excluded the former Force India entry from the championship "due to its inability to complete the season", and welcomed the new entity (Racing Point Force India F1 Team) that was able to race in the Belgian Grand Prix, but was not allowed to retain any points of the old team. The drivers, however, were able to keep their points in the Drivers' Championship. Under a special agreement, and with unanimous approval of the nine other teams, the new team was allowed to keep the prize money the old team had earned in the preceding years under the Sahara Force India name.

At the Belgian Grand Prix, Force India achieved 3rd and 4th place during a qualifying which was hit by rain during the final part. In the race they managed 5th and 6th place, thereby collecting 18 points allowing them to take the 9th place in the Constructors' Championship at the conclusion of their first Grand Prix. They finished the next race in Italy in 6th and 7th, therefore jumping to 7th in the Constructors' Championship, ahead of Sauber, Toro Rosso and Williams. The Singapore Grand Prix was a disaster for the team with no points finishing as Sergio Pérez collided with his teammate Esteban Ocon on the opening lap. Ocon retired instantly before Pérez collided with Sergey Sirotkin and finished the race 16th. Racing Point Force India collected 52 points in total in the 2018 season and finished the season in 7th, 4 points ahead of Sauber and 7 points behind McLaren.

== Complete Formula One results ==
(key) (results in bold indicate pole position; races in italics indicate fastest lap)

Year	Chassis	Engine	Tyres	Drivers	1	2	3	4	5	6	7	8	9	10	11	12	13	14	15	16	17	18	19	20	21	Points	WCC
2018	VJM11	Mercedes M09 EQ Power+ 1.6 V6 t	**P**		AUS	BHR	CHN	AZE	ESP	MON	CAN	FRA	AUT	GBR	GER	HUN	BEL	ITA	SIN	RUS	JPN	USA	MEX	BRA	ABU	52	7th
2018	VJM11	Mercedes M09 EQ Power+ 1.6 V6 t	**P**	(Mexico) Sergio Pérez													5	7	16	10	7	8	Ret	10	8	52	7th
2018	VJM11	Mercedes M09 EQ Power+ 1.6 V6 t	**P**	(France) Esteban Ocon													6	6	Ret	9	9	DSQ	11	14	Ret	52	7th
