= 2019 Canadian Grand Prix =

7th round of the 2019 Formula One season

Race 7 of 21 in the 2019 Formula One World Championship
← Previous race	Next race →
- Layout of the Circuit Gilles Villeneuve

Race details
- Date: 9 June 2019
- Official name: Formula 1 Pirelli Grand Prix du Canada 2019
- Location: Circuit Gilles Villeneuve; Montreal, Quebec, Canada
- Course: Street circuit
- Course length: 4.361 km (2.710 miles)
- Distance: 70 laps, 305.270 km (189.686 miles)
- Weather: Temperatures reaching up to 29.6 °C (85.3 °F); wind speeds negligible
- Attendance: 307,000

Pole position
Driver	(Germany) Sebastian Vettel	Ferrari
- Time: 1:10.240

Fastest lap
Driver	(Finland) Valtteri Bottas	Mercedes
- Time: 1:13.078 on lap 69 (lap record)

Podium
First	(United Kingdom) Lewis Hamilton	Mercedes
Second	(Germany) Sebastian Vettel	Ferrari
Third	(Monaco) Charles Leclerc	Ferrari
- Lap leaders: Sebastian Vettel penalised with five seconds, losing victory.

The 2019 Canadian Grand Prix (formally known as the Formula 1 Pirelli Grand Prix du Canada 2019) was a Formula One motor race held on 9 June 2019 at the Circuit Gilles Villeneuve in Montreal, Quebec, Canada. It was the 7th round of the 2019 FIA Formula One World Championship. It was the 56th running of the Canadian Grand Prix, the 50th time the event had been included as a round of the Formula One World Championship since the inception of the series in 1950, and the 40th time that a World Championship had been held at Circuit Gilles Villeneuve. The race was won by Lewis Hamilton after a controversial penalty was given to race leader Sebastian Vettel.

== Background ==
=== Championship standings before the race ===
Heading into the race Lewis Hamilton had a 17-point advantage over teammate Valtteri Bottas in the Drivers' Championship. In the Constructors' Championship it was Mercedes who held a 118-point advantage over Ferrari.

=== Entrants ===
The drivers and teams were the same as the season entry list with no additional stand-in drivers for the race. However, Nicholas Latifi drove in the first practice session for Williams.

Mission Winnow, the title sponsor of Ferrari, was banned from this race as it did not comply with local laws governing tobacco sponsorship.

== Qualifying ==
Sebastian Vettel won pole position ahead of Lewis Hamilton and Vettel's teammate Charles Leclerc. Max Verstappen could only finish 11th in Q2 following a crash at the final corner from Kevin Magnussen, who therefore failed to set a lap time in Q3, and started the race from the pit lane. Daniel Ricciardo qualified in 4th place for Renault, the team's highest qualifying position since Robert Kubica qualified 4th at the 2010 Japanese Grand Prix.

=== Qualifying classification ===
Pos.	No.	Driver	Constructor	Qualifying times			Grid
Pos.	No.	Driver	Constructor	Q1	Q2	Q3	Grid
1	5	(Germany) Sebastian Vettel	Ferrari	1:11.200	1:11.142	1:10.240	1
2	44	(United Kingdom) Lewis Hamilton	Mercedes	1:11.518	1:11.010	1:10.446	2
3	16	(Monaco) Charles Leclerc	Ferrari	1:11.214	1:11.205	1:10.920	3
4	3	(Australia) Daniel Ricciardo	Renault	1:11.837	1:11.532	1:11.071	4
5	10	(France) Pierre Gasly	Red Bull Racing-Honda	1:12.023	1:11.196	1:11.079	5
6	77	(Finland) Valtteri Bottas	Mercedes	1:11.229	1:11.095	1:11.101	6
7	27	(Germany) Nico Hülkenberg	Renault	1:11.720	1:11.553	1:11.324	7
8	4	(United Kingdom) Lando Norris	McLaren-Renault	1:11.780	1:11.735	1:11.863	8
9	55	(Spain) Carlos Sainz Jr.	McLaren-Renault	1:11.750	1:11.572	1:13.981	11^{a}
10	20	(Denmark) Kevin Magnussen	Haas-Ferrari	1:12.107	1:11.786	No time	PL^{b}
11	33	(Netherlands) Max Verstappen	Red Bull Racing-Honda	1:11.619	1:11.800	N/A	9
12	26	(Russia) Daniil Kvyat	Scuderia Toro Rosso-Honda	1:11.965	1:11.921	N/A	10
13	99	(Italy) Antonio Giovinazzi	Alfa Romeo Racing-Ferrari	1:12.122	1:12.136	N/A	12
14	23	(Thailand) Alexander Albon	Scuderia Toro Rosso-Honda	1:12.020	1:12.193	N/A	13
15	8	(France) Romain Grosjean	Haas-Ferrari	1:12.109	No time	N/A	14
16	11	(Mexico) Sergio Pérez	Racing Point-BWT Mercedes	1:12.197	N/A	N/A	15
17	7	(Finland) Kimi Räikkönen	Alfa Romeo Racing-Ferrari	1:12.230	N/A	N/A	16
18	18	(Canada) Lance Stroll	Racing Point-BWT Mercedes	1:12.266	N/A	N/A	17
19	63	(United Kingdom) George Russell	Williams-Mercedes	1:13.617	N/A	N/A	18
20	88	(Poland) Robert Kubica	Williams-Mercedes	1:14.393	N/A	N/A	19
107% time: 1:16.184

Notes

- ^a – Carlos Sainz Jr. received a three-place grid penalty for impeding Alexander Albon during qualifying.
- ^b – Kevin Magnussen was required to start from the pit lane after having his chassis replaced due to a crash in qualifying. He also received a 15-place grid penalty: 10 places for his third Control Electronics (CE) and 5 places for an unscheduled gearbox change.

== Race ==
Sebastian Vettel started on pole and maintained the lead from Lewis Hamilton, who started in second place. The opening lap saw Valtteri Bottas lose sixth place to Nico Hülkenberg, and saw Alexander Albon squeezed between Sergio Pérez and Antonio Giovinazzi at turn one, making contact with Giovinazzi and causing Albon to lose his front wing. Debris from Albon was blown back into the cockpit of Romain Grosjean's Haas, catching on the car's halo and causing Grosjean to go straight on at turn two whilst he removed the debris with his hand, losing positions. Albon pitted at the end of the lap for a replacement, having fallen to last place. His pace suffered for the rest of the race, and the team eventually opted to retire his damaged car on lap 60. Carlos Sainz Jr. was forced to pit at the end of the third lap after his brake calipers began to overheat due to a duct blockage. The problem was cleared and Sainz emerged from the pits in 19th place.

On lap nine, Lando Norris, who was running in eighth place, pulled over to the side of the pit exit after suffering a broken right-rear suspension. It later emerged that the McLaren's brakes had overheated and set on fire, burning through the suspension. This was unconnected to the problem encountered earlier by his teammate, which was caused by a helmet visor tear-off. No safety car was deployed, since Norris' car had stopped away from the track.

Hülkenberg made his first pit stop at the end of lap 16, allowing Bottas and Max Verstappen to take fourth and fifth place respectively. Vettel pitted at the end of lap 26, with Hamilton inheriting the race lead. Vettel emerged in third place ahead of Bottas and Verstappen. On the following lap, Giovinazzi spun at turn two, coming to a stop on the grass and avoiding the barriers. He was able to recover and continue racing. Hamilton pitted at the end of lap 28, coming out behind Vettel and handing the lead to Charles Leclerc. Bottas pitted on lap 30, emerging in sixth place behind the Renault of Daniel Ricciardo. Leclerc pitted on lap 33, resulting in Vettel re-taking the lead. Bottas made it past Ricciardo on lap 38 after struggling to overtake the Renault since his pit stop.

Hamilton had been closely following Vettel until turn three of lap 48, when Vettel went straight on over the grass, missing turn four. As the Ferrari re-joined the track, Hamilton was squeezed towards the outside wall and was forced to slow down to avoid a collision. A lap later, Verstappen was the last of the front-runners to make a pit stop, emerging in seventh place behind both Renaults. By lap 52 the Red Bull had made it up to fifth place.

On lap 57, Vettel was handed a five-second time penalty for the lap 48 incident, for re-entering the track unsafely and forcing another driver off the track. Over the next thirteen laps, Vettel attempted to build a five-second gap to Hamilton in second. Vettel ultimately crossed the finish line in first place, but was only 1.3 seconds ahead, meaning the victory was awarded to Hamilton. At the conclusion of the race, rather than park his car in parc ferme, Vettel pulled over much earlier in the pit lane and had to be collected by an official to attend the podium. On the way, Vettel removed the #1 sign from in front of Hamilton's car and moved it to the empty space where his car should have been parked. Ferrari announced it would appeal the penalty. On 21 June the FIA denied the appeal, stating that Ferrari had supplied "...no significant and relevant new elements which were unavailable to the parties at the time [the penalty was given],..." The incident has been described as controversial.

=== Race classification ===
Pos.	No.	Driver	Constructor	Laps	Time/Retired	Grid	Points
1	44	(United Kingdom) Lewis Hamilton	Mercedes	70	1:29:07.084	2	25
2	5	(Germany) Sebastian Vettel	Ferrari	70	+3.658^{1}	1	18
3	16	(Monaco) Charles Leclerc	Ferrari	70	+4.696	3	15
4	77	(Finland) Valtteri Bottas	Mercedes	70	+51.043	6	13^{2}
5	33	(Netherlands) Max Verstappen	Red Bull Racing-Honda	70	+57.655	9	10
6	3	(Australia) Daniel Ricciardo	Renault	69	+1 lap	4	8
7	27	(Germany) Nico Hülkenberg	Renault	69	+1 lap	7	6
8	10	(France) Pierre Gasly	Red Bull Racing-Honda	69	+1 lap	5	4
9	18	(Canada) Lance Stroll	Racing Point-BWT Mercedes	69	+1 lap	17	2
10	26	(Russia) Daniil Kvyat	Scuderia Toro Rosso-Honda	69	+1 lap	10	1
11	55	(Spain) Carlos Sainz Jr.	McLaren-Renault	69	+1 lap	11	
12	11	(Mexico) Sergio Pérez	Racing Point-BWT Mercedes	69	+1 lap	15	
13	99	(Italy) Antonio Giovinazzi	Alfa Romeo Racing-Ferrari	69	+1 lap	12	
14	8	(France) Romain Grosjean	Haas-Ferrari	69	+1 lap	14	
15	7	(Finland) Kimi Räikkönen	Alfa Romeo Racing-Ferrari	69	+1 lap	16	
16	63	(United Kingdom) George Russell	Williams-Mercedes	68	+2 laps	18	
17	20	(Denmark) Kevin Magnussen	Haas-Ferrari	68	+2 laps	PL	
18	88	(Poland) Robert Kubica	Williams-Mercedes	67	+3 laps	19	
Ret	23	(Thailand) Alexander Albon	Scuderia Toro Rosso-Honda	59	Collision damage	13	
Ret	4	(United Kingdom) Lando Norris	McLaren-Renault	8	Suspension	8	
Fastest lap: (Finland) Valtteri Bottas (Mercedes) – 1:13.078 (lap 69)

Notes

- ^1 – Sebastian Vettel completed the race first but received a 5-second penalty for re-joining the track unsafely and forcing Lewis Hamilton off the track.
- ^2 – Includes one point for fastest lap.

== Championship standings after the race ==
Drivers' Championship standings

Pos.	Driver	Points
1	(United Kingdom) Lewis Hamilton	162
2	(Finland) Valtteri Bottas	133
3	(Germany) Sebastian Vettel	100
4	(Netherlands) Max Verstappen	88
5	(Monaco) Charles Leclerc	72

Constructors' Championship standings

	Pos.	Constructor	Points
	1	(Germany) Mercedes	295
	2	(Italy) Ferrari	172
	3	(Austria) Red Bull Racing-Honda	124
	4	(United Kingdom) McLaren-Renault	30
3	5	(France) Renault	28

- Note: Only the top five positions are included for both sets of standings.

Previous race: 2019 Monaco Grand Prix	FIA Formula One World Championship; 2019 season	Next race: 2019 French Grand Prix
Previous race: 2018 Canadian Grand Prix	Canadian Grand Prix	Next race: 2022 Canadian Grand Prix
