= Akio Haga =

Japanese engineer

- 羽下 晃生
- Born: 7 August 1966 (age 60); Shizuoka, Japan
- Education: Tokyo Gakugei University
- Occupation: Engineer
- Employer: Aston Martin Performance Technologies
- Known for: Formula One Engineer
- Title: Chief Designer

Akio Haga (Japanese: 羽下 晃生, Hepburn: Haga Akio) is a Japanese Formula One engineer. He is currently the chief engineer at Aston Martin Performance Technologies.

== Career ==
Haga studied at the Tokyo Gakugei University. He began his engineering career in 1991 with TOM'S Racing in Japan, working as a design engineer and race engineer in the Japanese Formula 3 Championship. He later moved to the United Kingdom in 1995 to continue working with TOM’S GB Ltd., supporting the British Formula 3 International Series as both a design and race engineer.

In 1998, Haga joined Jordan Grand Prix as a mechanical designer, before being promoted to Rear Suspension Design Group leader in 2000, overseeing rear suspension architecture and mechanical integration. In 2005 he was promoted to head of mechanical design, sticking with the team as it transitioned into Midland and Spyker F1, leading on suspension and power unit integration.

Haga became chief designer for Force India in 2008. During this period the role of chief designer alternated between Haga and Ian Hall, with Haga being responsible for the even-numbered chassis projects beginning with the Force India VJM01. As chief designer, Haga oversaw overall vehicle architecture, mechanical system integration, power unit packaging and detailed chassis design.

Haga remained in the chief designer role through Force India’s rebranding as Racing Point F1 Team and Aston Martin, continuing to lead chassis design and technical integration. He further gained responsibilities deputising for engineering director Luca Furbatto. In July 2025 Haga took on a new role as head of trackside liaison and then moved over to Aston Martin's non-F1 activities at the end of the season – becoming a chief engineer for Aston Martin Performance Technologies.
