= Jonathan Marshall (engineer) =

British Formula One engineer

- Education: University of Birmingham, Imperial College London
- Occupation: Engineer
- Employer: McLaren
- Known for: Formula One engineer
- Title: Vehicle Performance Director

Jonathan Marshall is a British Formula One and motorsport engineer. He is currently the Vehicle Performance Director for the McLaren Formula One team.

== Career ==
Marshall studied Mechanical Engineering, Manufacturing and Management at the University of Birmingham before completing an MSc in Control Systems at Imperial College London. He began his Formula One career in 2002 with Minardi as a vehicle dynamics engineer, where he helped commission a seven-post rig and develop associated analysis tools. He then moved to Jordan Grand Prix in 2003, continuing in vehicle dynamics and providing both factory and trackside performance support. In 2005 he joined Red Bull Racing as a trackside vehicle dynamics engineer, acting as a liaison between the race engineering and vehicle dynamics groups while developing modelling tools to support setup optimisation. During this period he also undertook a short secondment to Arden International as race engineer to Sébastien Buemi in the GP2 Asia Series.

Marshall moved to the Renault F1 Team in 2008, initially working as a test team engineer. He was promoted to performance engineer for the 2010 Formula One season, working with Robert Kubica and focusing on car performance optimisation and set-up management across race weekends, contributing to Kubica's three podium finishes that year. In 2011 he supported Nick Heidfeld and Bruno Senna in a similar role. Following the team's transition into the Lotus F1 Team, Marshall moved into simulator engineering, where he oversaw the development and operation of the team's driver-in-the-loop simulator and supported young driver testing programmes.

In 2014 Marshall joined Force India as Head of Vehicle Science, leading a group responsible for vehicle dynamics, simulator operation, ride development and correlation between simulation and track performance. He remained with the Silverstone team through its transition to Racing Point F1 Team in 2018 and Aston Martin F1 Team in 2021, continuing to oversee vehicle-science activities and long-term capability planning. In 2022 he moved to McLaren Racing as Director of Vehicle Performance, taking responsibility for performance methodology, simulation correlation and the integration of vehicle dynamics tools into race-weekend operations.
