= Guru Johl =

British aerodynamicist

- Occupation: Aerodynamicist
- Employer: Racing Bulls
- Title: Head of aerodynamics

Guru Johl is a British Formula One aerodynamicist. He is the Head of Aerodynamics at the Racing Bulls Formula One team.

== Career ==
Johl began his Formula One career in 2004 with Red Bull Racing as a wind tunnel designer, working on aerodynamic testing infrastructure and model development. He later became an aerodynamicist within the team, contributing to car development during Red Bull’s formative competitive years, and was promoted to Aerodynamics Team Leader in 2013.

In 2015, Johl joined the Silverstone-based team then known as Force India, where he served as Chief Aerodynamicist. In this role he oversaw aerodynamic development programmes across multiple regulatory cycles, contributing to the team’s consistent midfield competitiveness. He remained in this role as the Silverstone outfit transitioned into Racing Point F1 Team and Aston Martin F1 Team.

He moved to Scuderia AlphaTauri in 2023 as Department Head of Aerodynamics, before being appointed Head of Aerodynamics when the team changed name to Racing Bulls in 2024, leading the aerodynamic design and development group responsible for wind tunnel, CFD, and on-car performance evolution.
