= Racing Point F1 Team =

Former British Formula One constructor

Racing Point
- Full name: BWT Racing Point F1 Team
- Base: Silverstone, Northamptonshire, England, UK
- Founder(s): Lawrence Stroll
- Noted staff: Otmar Szafnauer; Andrew Green; Steve Curnow; Andy Stevenson
- Noted drivers: (Mexico) Sergio Pérez; (Canada) Lance Stroll; (Germany) Nico Hülkenberg
- Previous name: Racing Point Force India
- Next name: Aston Martin F1 Team

Formula One World Championship career
- First entry: 2019 Australian Grand Prix
- Last entry: 2020 Abu Dhabi Grand Prix
- Races entered: 38
- Engines: BWT Mercedes (Note: Racing Point used Mercedes engines. For sponsorship purposes, these engines were rebadged as "BWT Mercedes".)
- Constructors' Championships: 0
- Drivers' Championships: 0
- Race victories: 1
- Podiums: 4
- Points: 268
- Pole positions: 1
- Fastest laps: 0

Racing Point F1 Team, which competed as BWT Racing Point F1 Team and commonly known as Racing Point, was a British motor racing team and constructor that Racing Point UK entered into the Formula One World Championship. The team was based in Silverstone, England and competed under a British licence.

The team was renamed in February 2019 from Racing Point Force India F1 Team, which used the constructor name of Force India for the latter half of the 2018 season. Racing Point made their racing debut at the 2019 Australian Grand Prix. The team's drivers for the 2020 season were Sergio Pérez and Lance Stroll. The team rebranded to Aston Martin for the 2021 Formula One season.

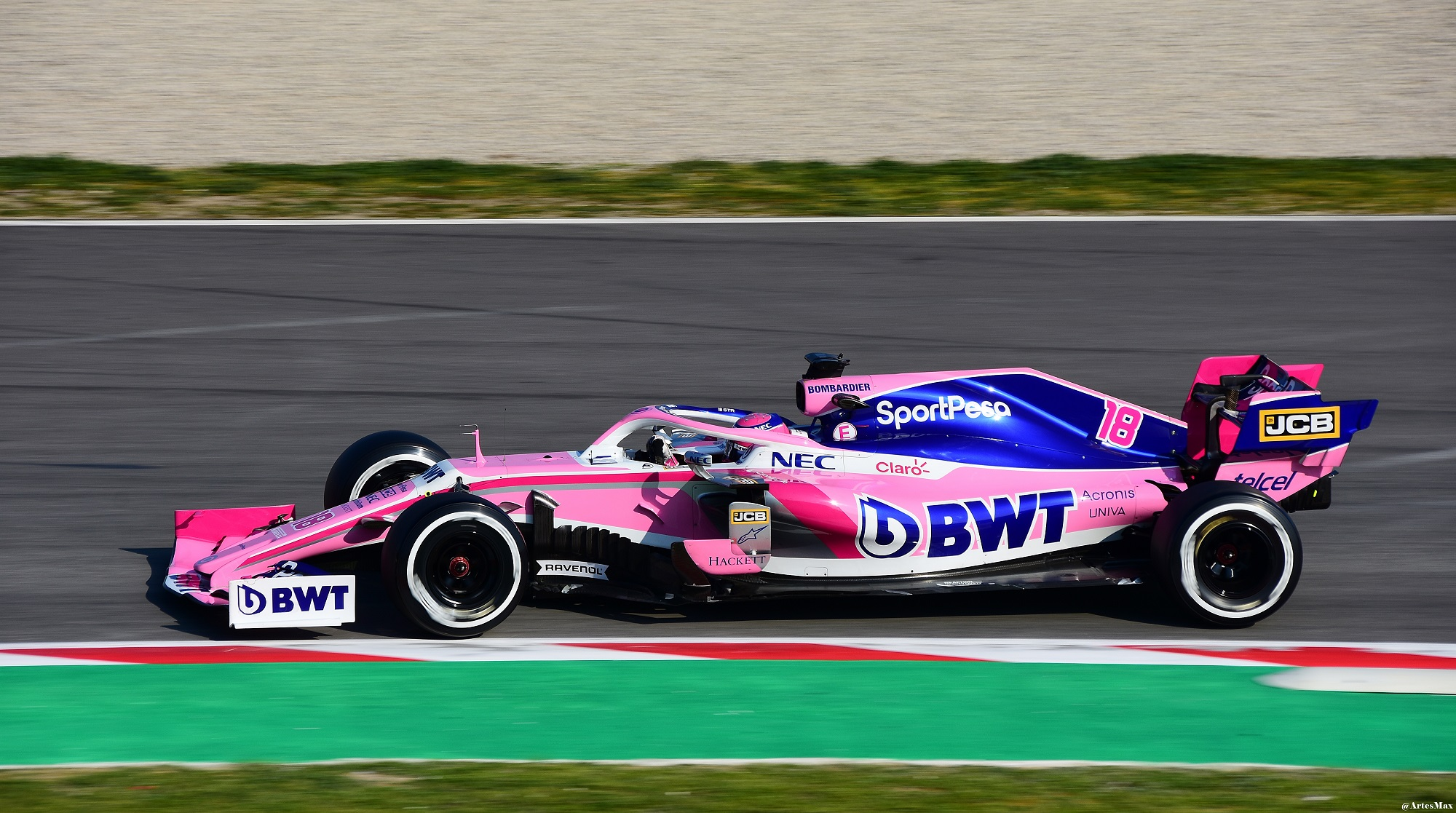
The Racing Point RP19, the car Racing Point used during the 2019 Formula One World Championship, pictured here during pre-season testing.

== Origins ==
Racing Point's origins lie in the Jordan Grand Prix team, which first raced in 1991. Jordan saw moderate success in the late 1990s and early 2000s, particularly in 1999 when the team achieved two race victories and finished 3rd in the World Constructors' Championship. A decline in performance followed, culminating in the team being sold to the Midland Group in 2005 and being renamed Midland F1 Racing for the 2006 season. The team remained unsuccessful, failing to score any points. Midland F1 was sold to Dutch sports car marque Spyker Cars late in the season, before becoming Spyker F1 in 2007. After another season with little improvement, albeit with the team scoring its first point in over two years at the 2007 Japanese Grand Prix, the team was sold to Indian businessman Vijay Mallya.

The Silverstone-based team was renamed Force India for the 2008 season, its fourth identity in as many years. Force India saw moderate success across its ten and a half years in Formula One, achieving a pole position at the 2009 Belgian Grand Prix, six podium places and finishing 4th in the World Constructors' Championship in both 2016 and 2017. During the 2018 season, the team was put into administration as a result of financial and legal troubles encountered by team owner Mallya. Force India's assets were purchased by Racing Point UK, a consortium led by Canadian businessman Lawrence Stroll. However, the team's Formula One entry was not transferable, marking the official end of the entry originating in 1991. The team was renamed Racing Point Force India for the remainder of the 2018 season before becoming Racing Point for the 2019 season.

== Racing history ==
=== 2019 season ===
Racing Point confirmed in November 2018 that Lance Stroll and Sergio Pérez would be the two drivers for the 2019 season. The 2019 season also saw the team branded as "SportPesa Racing Point F1 Team", acknowledging lead sponsor SportPesa, a sports betting company based in Kenya. The team's car for the 2019 season, the Racing Point RP19, was announced in Toronto, Canada. The team scored points at each of the first four races of the season, including a double points finish in Azerbaijan as Pérez and Stroll finished 6th and 9th respectively. Despite this early success, Racing Point went on to struggle during the middle part of the season, with Stroll's 9th place in Canada being the team's only points finish in the following six races. Their best result of the season came at the German Grand Prix, where Stroll briefly led the race as a result of tyre strategy in the wet weather before eventually finishing 4th.

Racing Point's fortunes improved in the second half of the season after the team brought significant upgrades ahead of the Belgian Grand Prix. Over the next nine races, Pérez scored points in all but one—retiring from the Singapore Grand Prix with an oil leak. This points streak brought Racing Point ahead of Alfa Romeo in the standings, finishing the season in 7th place with 73 points.

=== 2020 season ===
At the 2019 Belgian Grand Prix, it was confirmed that Stroll had been re-signed for 2020 and Pérez had been signed until the end of 2022. Pérez was set to spend at least nine consecutive seasons with the team in total since joining in 2014, albeit across four different names. SportPesa ended their title sponsorship arrangement with Racing Point, with Austrian water technology company BWT becoming the team's new title sponsor. During pre-season testing Racing Point's car, the RP20 caused controversy due to its resemblance to the Mercedes AMG F1 W10 EQ Power+, which won the 2019 Formula One World Championship. Following the Styrian Grand Prix a formal protest was launched against the RP20 specifically surrounding the brake ducts which the rules dictate must be designed by the team. Officials have impounded the brake ducts from both the RP20 and the W10 to investigate the protest. Three days before the British Grand Prix, Pérez tested positive for COVID-19. Due to this Pérez was unable to participate in both the British Grand Prix and the 70th Anniversary Grand Prix. Nico Hülkenberg served as a substitute driver for both events. Between the British and 70th Anniversary Grands Prix, Racing Point was fined €400,000 and had 15 constructors points deducted after the protest lodged by Renault F1 Team was upheld.

At the Italian Grand Prix, Stroll finished third and took the team's first ever podium. At the Eifel Grand Prix, Lance Stroll was unable to participate in qualifying and the race due to having tested positive for coronavirus. Hülkenberg would serve as his substitute for the next two sessions, finishing 8th after starting 20th.

At the Turkish Grand Prix, Stroll achieved the team's first-ever pole position, with teammate Pérez qualifying third. In the race, Stroll led early into the race but eventually dropped to ninth, while Pérez achieved second place, taking the team's second podium finish. Pérez came close to taking the team's third podium finish in the Bahrain Grand Prix, but a late engine failure in lap 54 forced him to retire. Earlier in the race, Stroll's car was flipped upside down due to a collision with Daniil Kvyat, which meant Bahrain was the first race in which both cars did not score a point in the 2020 season. At the Sakhir Grand Prix, Pérez gave Racing Point their first win as a constructor and as a legal entity while Stroll also finished on the podium with his 3rd-place finish. This was the first time any incarnation of the team had won a race since Jordan won the 2003 Brazilian Grand Prix. It was the fifth Grand Prix victory for any incarnation of the team.

After Lawrence Stroll bought a 16.7% stake in Aston Martin, the team rebranded to Aston Martin F1 Team.

== Complete Formula One results ==
(key)

Year	Chassis	Engine	Tyres	Drivers	1	2	3	4	5	6	7	8	9	10	11	12	13	14	15	16	17	18	19	20	21	Points	WCC
2019	RP19	BWT Mercedes 1.6 V6 t	P		AUS	BHR	CHN	AZE	ESP	MON	CAN	FRA	AUT	GBR	GER	HUN	BEL	ITA	SIN	RUS	JPN	MEX	USA	BRA	ABU	73	7th
2019	RP19	BWT Mercedes 1.6 V6 t	P	(Mexico) Sergio Pérez	13	10	8	6	15	12	12	12	11	17	Ret	11	6	7	Ret	7	8	7	10	9	7	73	7th
2019	RP19	BWT Mercedes 1.6 V6 t	P	(Canada) Lance Stroll	9	14	12	9	Ret	16	9	13	14	13	4	17	10	12	13	11	9	12	13	19^{†}	Ret	73	7th
2020	RP20	BWT Mercedes 1.6 V6 t	P		AUT	STY	HUN	GBR	70A	ESP	BEL	ITA	TUS	RUS	EIF	POR	EMI	TUR	BHR	SKH	ABU					195 (Note: Racing Point drivers scored 210 points, but the constructor was deducted 15 points after a protest from Renault was upheld regarding the legality of their car.)	4th
2020	RP20	BWT Mercedes 1.6 V6 t	P	(Mexico) Sergio Pérez	6	6	7	WD		5	10	10	5	4	4	7	6	2	18†	1	Ret					195	4th
2020	RP20	BWT Mercedes 1.6 V6 t	P	(Canada) Lance Stroll	Ret	7	4	9	6	4	9	3	Ret	Ret	WD	Ret	13	9^{P}	Ret	3	10					195	4th
2020	RP20	BWT Mercedes 1.6 V6 t	P	(Germany) Nico Hülkenberg				DNS	7						8											195	4th

Notes

- ^{†} – The driver did not finish the Grand Prix, but was classified as he completed over 90% of the race distance.
