= Red Bull Racing RB15 =

2019 Formula One racing car

Red Bull RB15
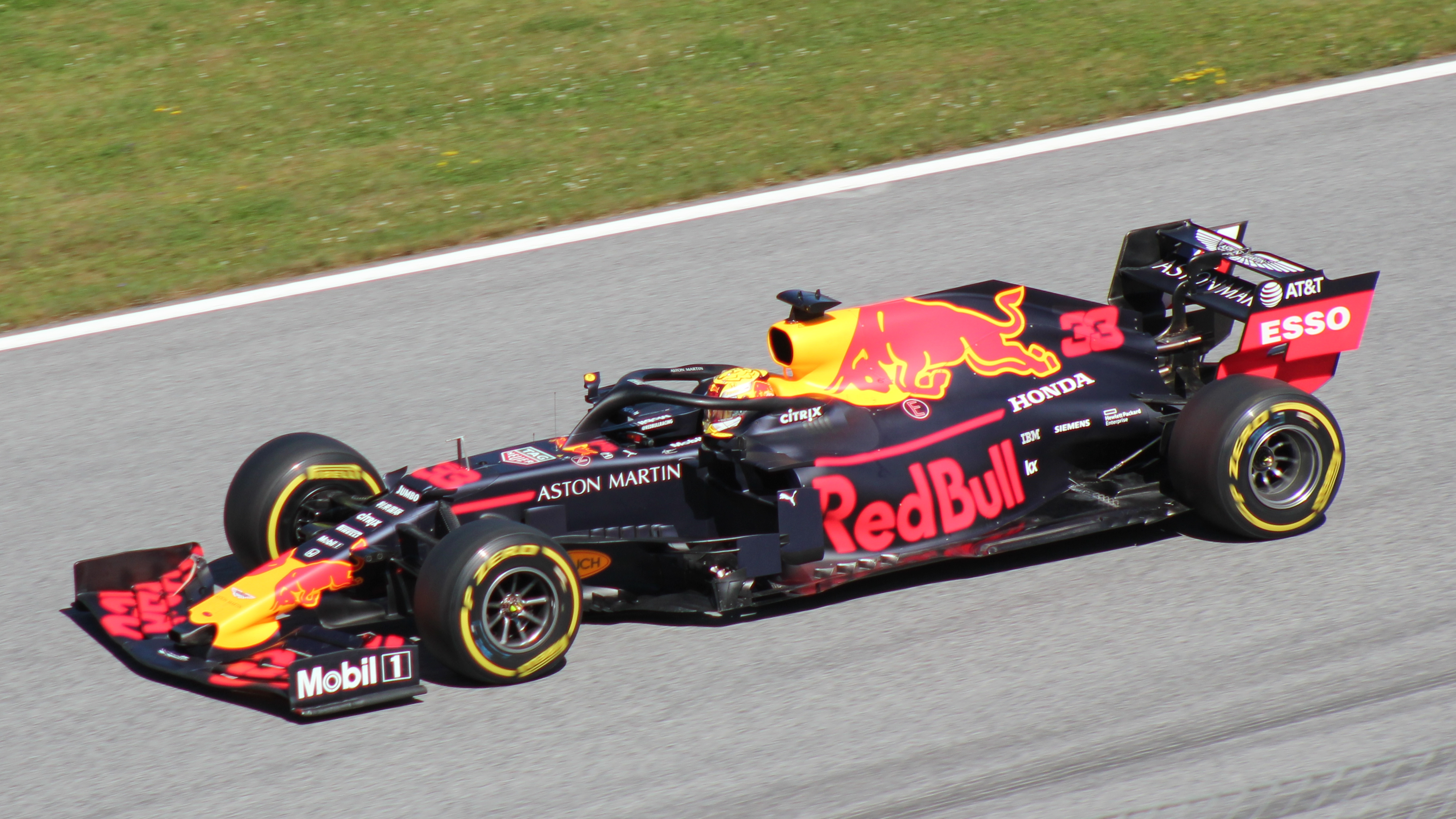
- Max Verstappen driving the RB15 during the Austrian Grand Prix
- Category: Formula One
- Constructor: Red Bull Racing (chassis); Honda Racing Development Sakura (power unit)
- Designers: Adrian Newey (Chief Technical Officer); Pierre Waché (Technical Director); Rob Marshall (Chief Engineering Officer); Rob Gray (Chief Designer); Steve Winstanley (Deputy Chief Designer, Composites and Structures); David Worner (Deputy Chief Designer, Mechanics and Suspension); Ben Waterhouse (Head of Performance Engineering); Dan Fallows (Head of Aerodynamics); Craig Skinner (Chief Aerodynamicist); Toyoharu Tanabe (Power Unit Technical Director - Honda)
- Predecessor: Red Bull RB14
- Successor: Red Bull RB16

Technical specifications
- Chassis: Carbon-epoxy composite structure designed by regulation and built in-house
- Suspension (front): Aluminium alloy uprights, carbon fibre composite double wishbones with pushrods, springs, anti-roll bar and dampers
- Suspension (rear): Aluminium alloy uprights, carbon fibre composite double wishbones with pullrods, springs, anti-roll bar and dampers
- Length: 5,400 mm (213 in)
- Width: 2,000 mm (79 in)
- Height: 950 mm (37 in) (excluding roll-hoop onboard T-camera)
- Engine: Honda RA619H 1.6 L (98 cu in) direct injection V6 turbocharged engine limited to 15,000 rpm in a mid-mounted, rear-wheel drive layout
- Electric motor: Kinetic and thermal energy recovery systems
- Transmission: Red Bull Technology 8-speed + 1 reverse sequential semi-automatic paddle shift with limited-slip differential
- Battery: Honda lithium-ion batteries
- Power: 900 hp (671 kW)
- Weight: 743 kg (1,638 lb) including driver and fuel
- Fuel: Exxon/Esso (Exxon for US race only) Synergy and Mobil High Performance Unleaded (Mexican race only) 94.25% gasoline + 5.75% bio fuel
- Lubricants: Mobil 1 0W-40 fully-synthetic motor oil
- Brakes: Brembo carbon discs, Brembo 6-piston calipers and pads
- Tyres: Pirelli P Zero (dry); Pirelli Cinturato (wet)

Competition history
- Notable entrants: Aston Martin Red Bull Racing
- Notable drivers: 10. (France) Pierre Gasly; 23. (Thailand) Alexander Albon; 33. (Netherlands) Max Verstappen
- Debut: 2019 Australian Grand Prix
- First win: 2019 Austrian Grand Prix
- Last win: 2019 Brazilian Grand Prix
- Last event: 2019 Abu Dhabi Grand Prix
Races	Wins	Podiums	Poles	F/Laps
21	3	9	2	5

The Red Bull RB15 is a Formula One racing car designed and constructed by Red Bull Racing to compete during the 2019 FIA Formula One World Championship and the first to be powered by a Honda engine, in the form of the RA619H. The car was driven by Max Verstappen, Pierre Gasly and Alexander Albon. Pierre Gasly was originally meant to be driving the car for the entire season after moving from Toro Rosso to replace Daniel Ricciardo. However, after the 2019 Hungarian Grand Prix it was announced that Alexander Albon would be replacing Gasly for the remainder of the season. The car made its competitive début at the 2019 Australian Grand Prix. Max Verstappen's win at the 2019 Austrian Grand Prix made the RB15 the first Honda-powered car to achieve victory since Jenson Button won for Honda at the 2006 Hungarian Grand Prix in the Honda RA106.

== Development ==
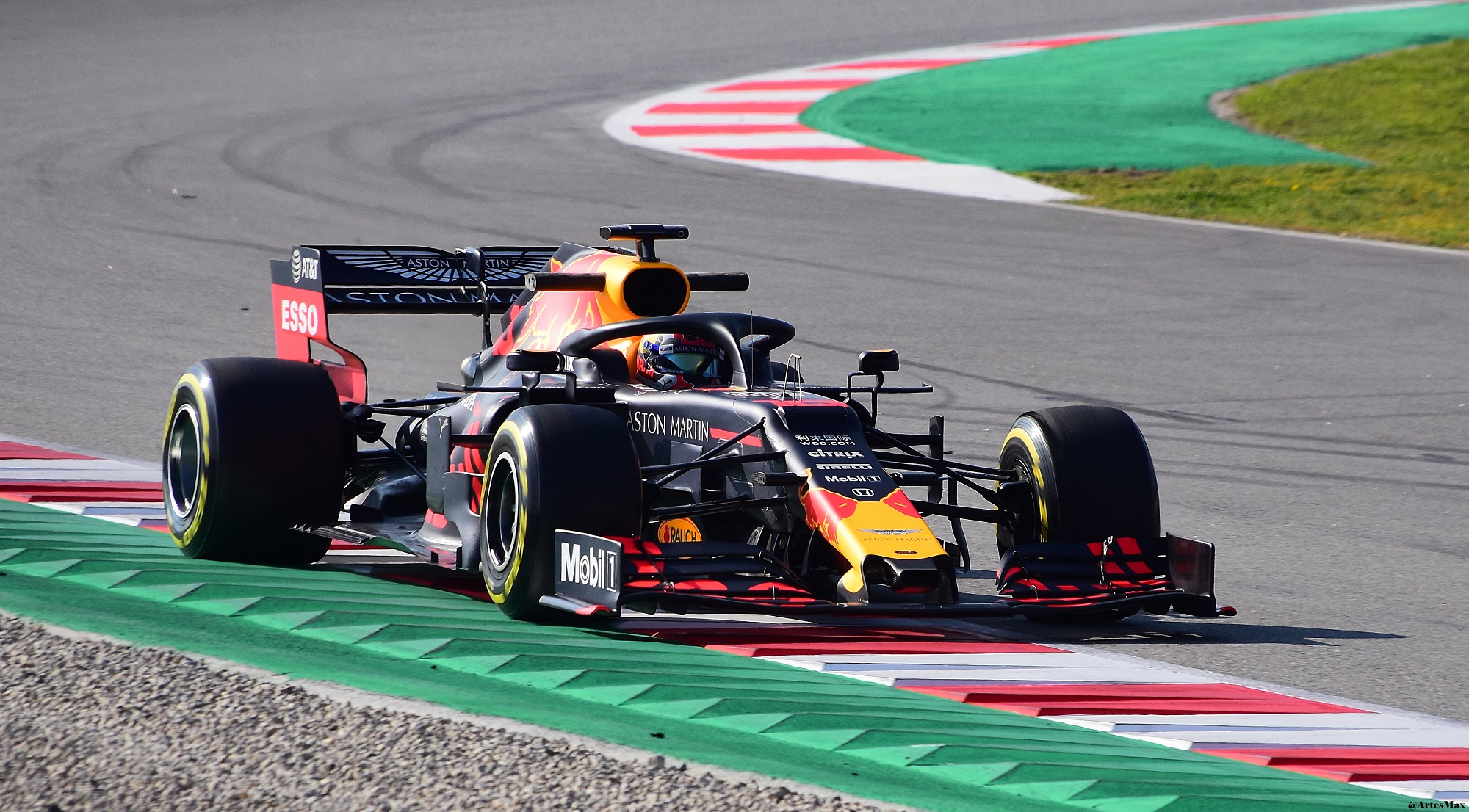
Gasly during pre-season testing

Development of the RB15 marked a big transition due to the switch from Renault to Honda power units. This change required a complete redesign of the car's rear end in order to accommodate the new engine. The Honda engine has a unique design; it has a split turbo system similar to Mercedes. There were also changes to the cooling system, new aerodynamic adjustments such as the wing design, an improves airflow, optimized bargeboards to maximize the chassis performance.

== Competition history ==
=== Opening rounds ===
In Australia, the team showed good pace during the free practice sessions. However, Gasly was knocked out in Q1 after a strategy error by the team, while team-mate Verstappen qualified fourth, behind the Ferrari of Sebastian Vettel. In the race, Verstappen finished third, giving Honda their first podium finish since 2008. Gasly recovered from seventeenth to finish eleventh, just outside the points. Team principal Christian Horner praised Gasly for his effort over the radio during the cool-down lap.

In Bahrain, Ferrari dominated the timing sheets of the practice sessions. Verstappen qualified in 5th, while Gasly qualified in 13th. In the race, Verstappen narrowly missed out on the podium as he finished in 4th, while Gasly finished in 8th.

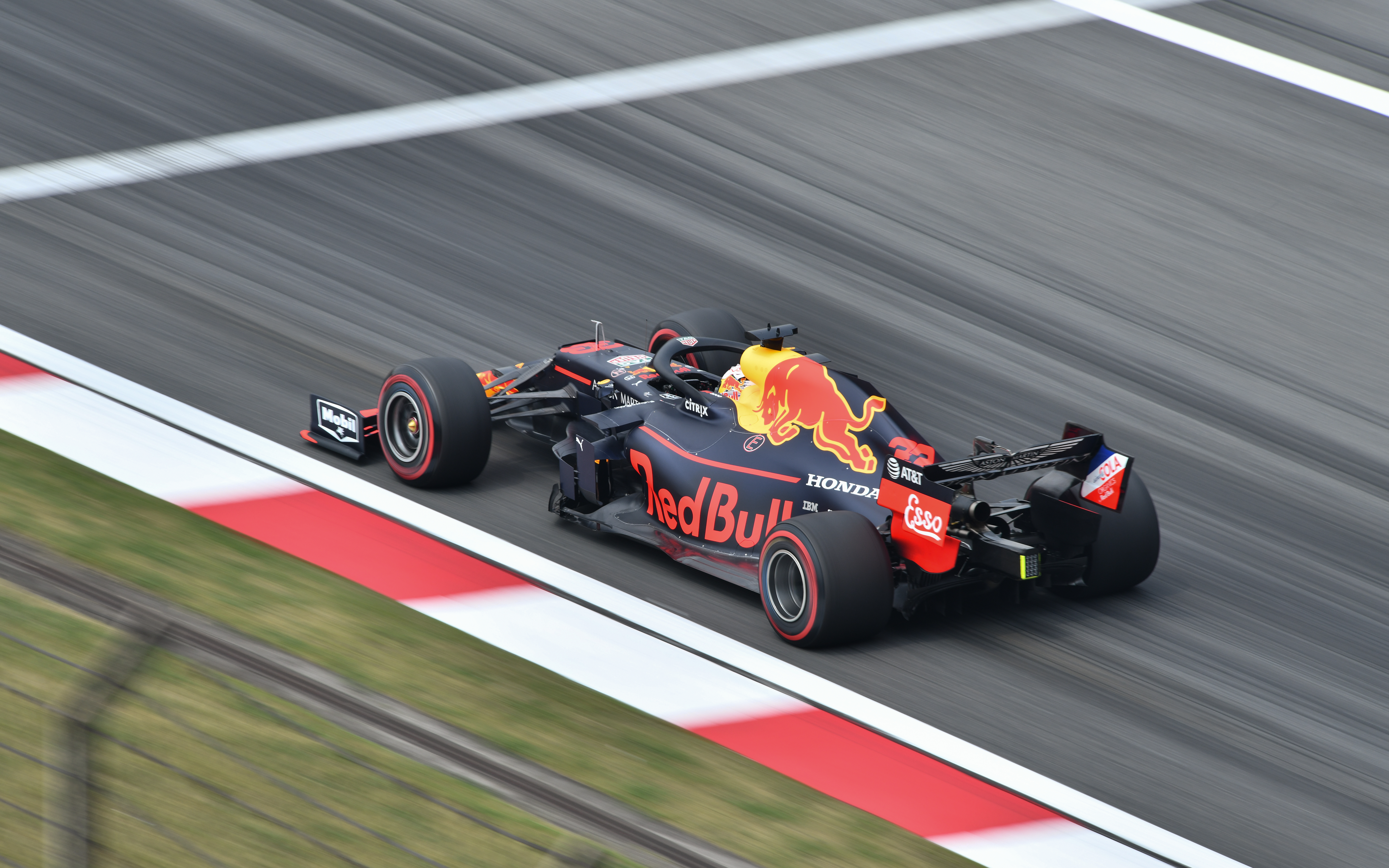
Verstappen during the Chinese Grand Prix

In China, both Red Bull cars secured third-row lockout with Verstappen and Gasly qualifying 5th and 6th respectively, giving the latter his first Q3 appearance this season. In the race, Verstappen finished in fourth, while Gasly finished in sixth place whilst setting the fastest lap to secure an additional point.

In Azerbaijan, Verstappen finished fourth, while Gasly retired from the race with a mechanical issue. After the race, Verstappen dropped into fourth in the Drivers' Championship, trailing by a point from third-placed Sebastian Vettel who had 52 points.

=== European and Canadian rounds ===
In Spain, Verstappen and Gasly qualified 4th and 6th respectively. Verstappen went on to finish 3rd after a move on Sebastian Vettel on Lap 1 (replicating his result from the previous year), whilst Gasly finished where he started, in 6th place.

In Monaco, Verstappen qualified 3rd, with Gasly 5th (but he took a 3-place grid penalty for impeding Romain Grosjean in Q1, and would therefore start 8th). Verstappen would cross the line in 2nd but was demoted to 4th after a 5-second penalty for an unsafe release, whilst Gasly was 5th (setting the fastest lap in the process).

In Canada, Verstappen was caught out by red flags for Kevin Magnussen crashing at the end of Q2 and would only qualify 11th, with Gasly 5th. In the race, Verstappen came back through to finish in 5th, with Gasly falling to 8th.

In France, Verstappen qualified 4th with Gasly in a disappointing 9th. The race would be worse for the Frenchman as he fell to 11th, before being promoted back up into 10th following a 5-second penalty for Daniel Ricciardo. Verstappen finished 4th.

In Austria, Verstappen qualified 3rd, before being promoted to the front row following a 3-place grid penalty for Lewis Hamilton; Gasly was 9th for the second weekend in a row. In the race, despite going into anti-stall at the start and falling to 8th, Verstappen came back through to win, to give Honda their first win since 2006, as well as his first win since Mexico the previous year, and the first non-Mercedes win of 2019. Gasly finished down in 7th and was lapped by Verstappen, putting his Red Bull seat further into question.

In Britain, Verstappen qualified 4th, with Gasly 5th. On Lap 37, the Dutchman overtook Sebastian Vettel into Stowe, before being rear-ended by the German; he went on to finish 5th, with Gasly in 4th. (Also, on Lap 12, Red Bull broke the record for the fastest pitstop with Gasly, with 1.91 seconds - this beat the previous time of 1.92 seconds, jointly held by Red Bull and Williams and had stood since 2013).

In Germany, the two Red Bulls took advantage of power unit problems for both Ferraris to qualify 3rd (Verstappen) and 4th (Gasly). In a chaotic wet-to-dry race, Verstappen came through to win the race (despite spinning on Lap 27) for the 7th race win of his career, and 2nd of the season. Gasly had a miserable race; after dropping a number of places on Lap 1, he was stuck in the midfield for the most part, eventually retiring after a collision with Alex Albon on Lap 62 (after running into the back of the Toro Rosso approaching Turn 7).

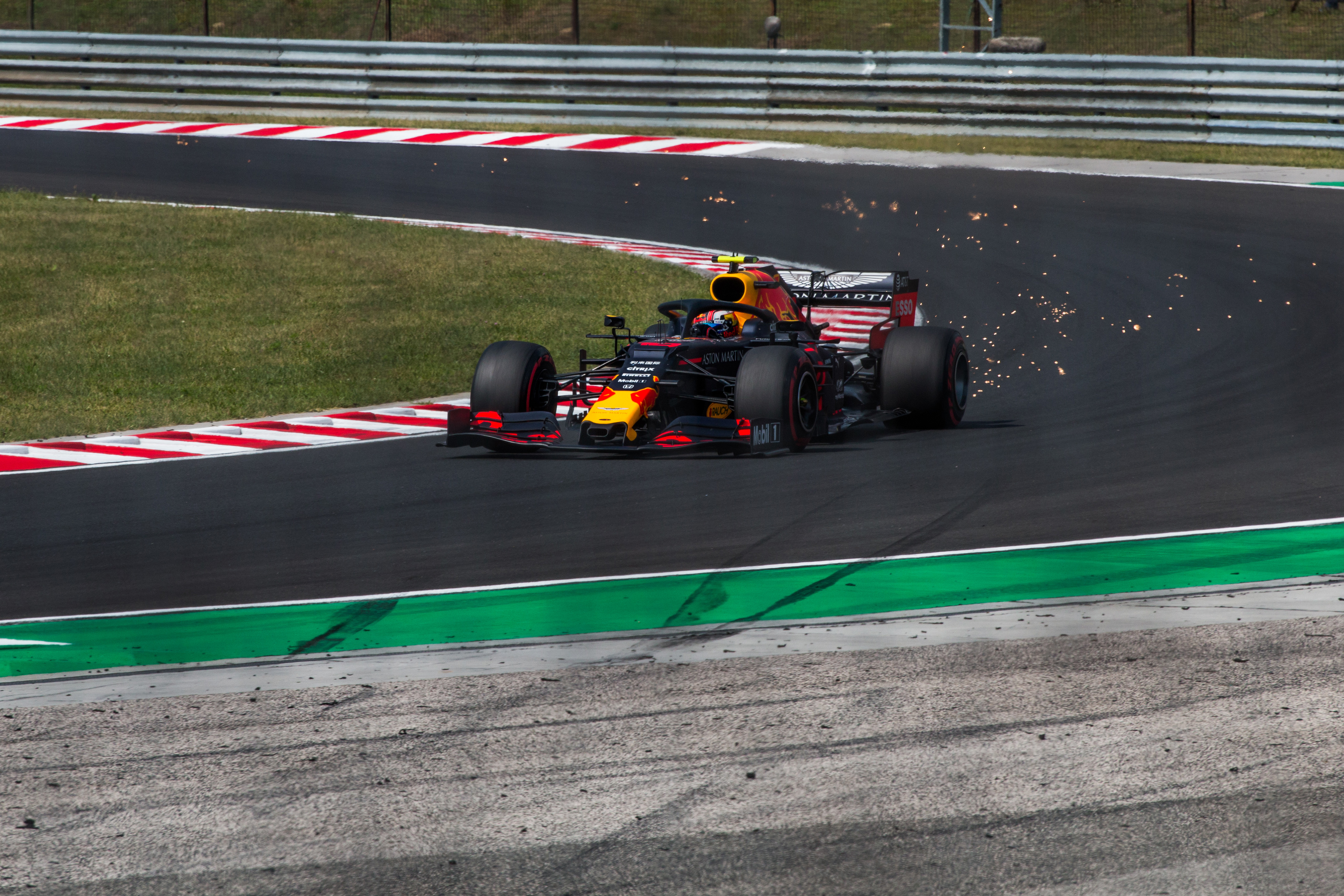
Gasly qualifying for the Hungarian Grand Prix

In Hungary, Verstappen took the first pole position of his F1 career (in turn becoming, at the time, the 5th-youngest pole sitter in F1 history, the first Dutchman to take an F1 pole position, and the 100th different polesitter in F1 since 1950), as well as Honda's first pole since 2006. Gasly was down in 6th. In the race, Red Bull were outdone by Mercedes strategy that saw Lewis Hamilton pass Verstappen on fresher mediums on Lap 67 - the Dutchman still finished 2nd with the fastest lap. Gasly finished a disappointing 6th, stuck behind Carlos Sainz's McLaren for most of the race, and ended up being lapped by Verstappen.

=== Post-summer break (Belgium to Japan) ===
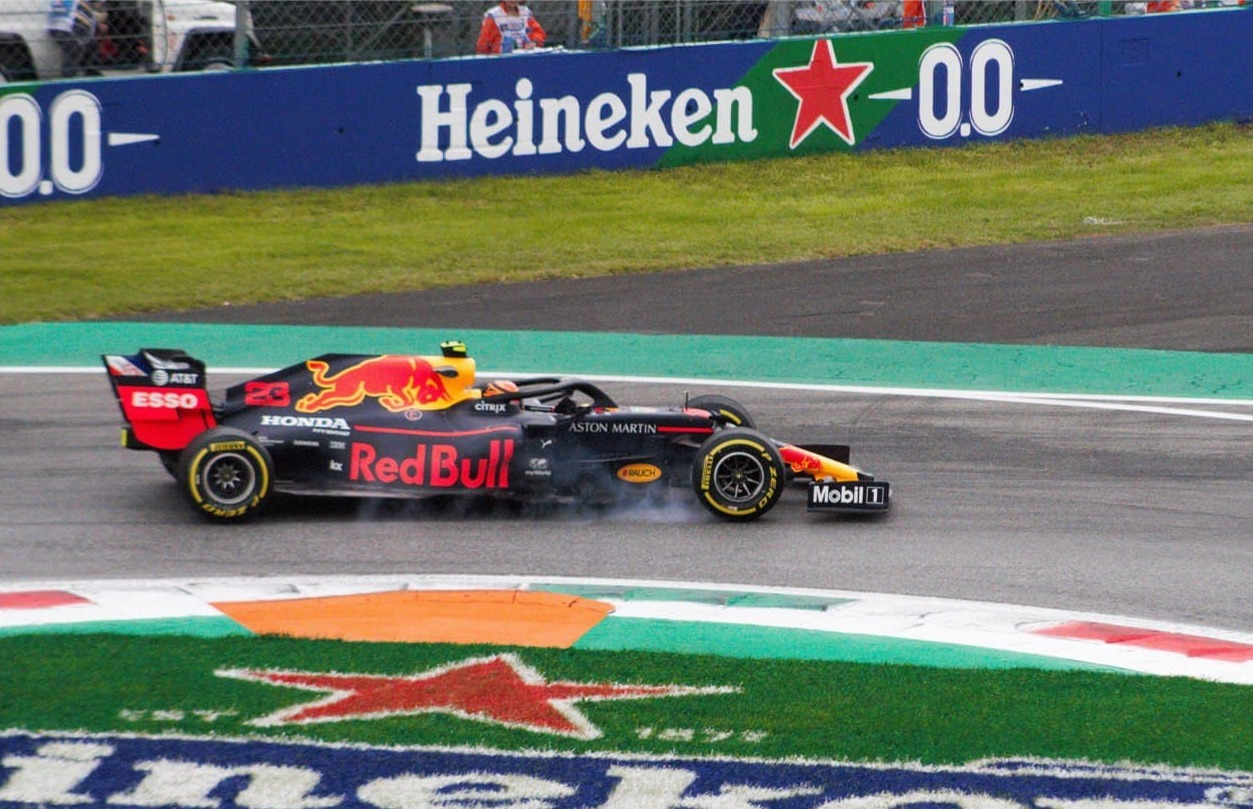
Albon on his second outing with Red Bull at the Italian Grand Prix

On 12 August, Red Bull announced that Alexander Albon would be promoted to the team for the remainder of the season, with Gasly taking Albon's seat at Toro Rosso. The change took place with immediate effect starting with the Belgian Grand Prix.

In Belgium, Verstappen qualified 5th, with Albon in 14th (he started 17th after grid penalties were applied). Verstappen retired from the race on the first lap, after colliding with Kimi Räikkönen at La Source (Turn 1) and; following a suspension failure from clipping Räikkönen again, hitting the wall at Radillion (Turn 5). Albon went on to finish 5th on his Red Bull debut.

In Italy, Verstappen was due to start at the back of the grid after taking new engine components, but suffered power unit issues in qualifying and didn't set a time. Albon, meanwhile, got through to Q3, but failed to set a time after getting caught out by every driver moving rather slowly in order to avoid the slipstream effect, and qualified in 8th. In the race, after getting caught behind slow-moving cars at Turn 1, Verstappen damaged his front wing and had to pit at the end of Lap 1 - he eventually finished in 8th. Albon was 6th, despite losing positions after a collision with Carlos Sainz Jr. at the first Lesmo corner on Lap 3 which saw Albon run into the gravel.

In Singapore, Verstappen and Albon qualified 4th and 6th respectively, and went on to finish in 3rd (Verstappen), and 6th (Albon).

In Russia, both cars were due to take 5-place grid penalties for new engine components. Verstappen qualified 4th (so started 9th), whilst Albon crashed in Q1 (he eventually started from the pit lane after he had his floor changed). They went on to finish 4th and 5th respectively.

In Japan (Honda's home race), Verstappen and Albon qualified 5th and 6th respectively (with the pair setting the exact same time; Verstappen qualified in front as he set his time first). Albon finished in 4th (his best F1 result), while Verstappen retired after colliding with Charles Leclerc at Turn 2 on Lap 1 and suffering from damage the team deemed too great to continue with on Lap 13.

=== Closing rounds ===
In Mexico, Verstappen took pole, only for a crash for Valtteri Bottas to bring out the yellow flags, forcing all other drivers to slow down. As Verstappen failed to slow down for the yellow flag zone, he received a three-place grid penalty, dropping him to 4th on the grid. Albon, meanwhile, qualified 5th. In the race, Verstappen made slight contact with the Mercedes of Lewis Hamilton at the start and fell behind Albon and the McLarens of Carlos Sainz and Lando Norris, before suffering a puncture as a result of contact with Bottas. Both drivers would go on to finish 5th (Albon) and 6th (Verstappen) respectively.

At Austin, Verstappen and Albon qualified 3rd and 6th respectively, and went on to finish 3rd (Verstappen) and 5th (Albon).

In Brazil, Verstappen took pole and Albon qualified 6th. In the race, Verstappen took his 3rd win of the season, while Albon had been on course for 2nd until being hit by Lewis Hamilton on the penultimate lap, dropping him to 15th (he would be promoted to 14th after a time penalty for Nico Hülkenberg).

For the season finale in Abu Dhabi, Verstappen qualified 3rd while Albon was 6th again. In the race, Verstappen passed Charles Leclerc late on to finish 2nd, while Albon finished where he started.

== Sponsorship and livery ==
At the Monaco Grand Prix, the team paid tribute to Niki Lauda with his image and text reading "Danke Niki" on the sidepods. At the Chinese Grand Prix, they ran with a retro-inspired Esso logo on the rear wing and Mobil logo on the front wing. At the British Grand Prix, the "007" logo was featured on the front side and front rear wing, commemorating the 1007th World Championship race. The license plate featured on both cars; Verstappen's rear wing was "BMT 216A" (1964 Aston Martin DB5 from Goldfinger) while for Gasly's rear wing was "B549 WUU" (1977 Aston Martin V8 Vantage from The Living Daylights). The drivers worn the race suit in likeness of James Bond's suit.

== Later use ==
A modified RB15 was used during testing of the 2022 tyre compounds after the 2021 Abu Dhabi Grand Prix.

== Complete Formula One results ==
(key)

Year	Entrant	Engine	Tyres	Drivers	Grands Prix																					Points	WCC
Year	Entrant	Engine	Tyres	Drivers	AUS	BHR	CHN	AZE	ESP	MON	CAN	FRA	AUT	GBR	GER	HUN	BEL	ITA	SIN	RUS	JPN	MEX	USA	BRA	ABU	Points	WCC
2019	Aston Martin Red Bull Racing	Honda RA619H	P	(France) Pierre Gasly	11	8	6^{F}	Ret	6	5^{F}	8	10	7	4	14†	6										417	3rd
2019	Aston Martin Red Bull Racing	Honda RA619H	P	(Thailand) Alexander Albon													5	6	6	5	4	5	5	14	6	417	3rd
2019	Aston Martin Red Bull Racing	Honda RA619H	P	(Netherlands) Max Verstappen	3	4	4	4	3	4	5	4	1^{F}	5	1^{F}	2^{P}^{F}	Ret	8	3	4	Ret	6	3	1^{P}	2	417	3rd

^{†} Driver failed to finish the race, but was classified as they had completed over 90% of the winner's race distance.
