= 2019 Austrian Grand Prix =

Race 9 of 21 in the 2019 Formula One World Championship
← Previous race	Next race →
- Layout of the Red Bull Ring

Race details
- Date: 30 June 2019
- Official name: Formula 1 myWorld Grosser Preis von Österreich 2019
- Location: Red Bull Ring; Spielberg, Styria, Austria
- Course: Permanent racing facility
- Course length: 4.318 km (2.683 miles)
- Distance: 71 laps, 306.452 km (190.420 miles)
- Weather: Sunny, 36C (97F)
- Attendance: 203,000

Pole position
Driver	(Monaco) Charles Leclerc	Ferrari
- Time: 1:03.003

Fastest lap
Driver	(Netherlands) Max Verstappen	Red Bull Racing-Honda
- Time: 1:07.475 on lap 60

Podium
First	(Netherlands) Max Verstappen	Red Bull Racing-Honda
Second	(Monaco) Charles Leclerc	Ferrari
Third	(Finland) Valtteri Bottas	Mercedes

The 2019 Austrian Grand Prix (formally known as the Formula 1 myWorld Großer Preis von Österreich 2019) was a Formula One motor race held on 30 June 2019 at the Red Bull Ring in Spielberg, Austria. The race was the ninth round of the 2019 Formula One World Championship. The race marked the 33rd running of the Austrian Grand Prix and the 32nd time it had been held as a round of the Formula One World Championship since the series inception in 1950. The victory of Max Verstappen in the Red Bull Racing RB15 was the first win for a Honda-powered F1 car since Jenson Button in the 2006 Hungarian Grand Prix and he also became the first non-Mercedes driver to win a race in 2019. The race marked the first time that Red Bull made it back-to-back wins at their home Grand Prix.

== Background ==
=== Championship standings before the race ===
Heading into the race Lewis Hamilton had a 36-point advantage over teammate Valtteri Bottas in the Drivers' Championship. In the Constructors' Championship Mercedes held a 140-point advantage over Ferrari.

=== Entrants ===
The drivers and teams entered were the same as those on the season entry list with no additional stand-in drivers for either the race or practice.

=== Penalties ===
Prior to the start of the weekend Carlos Sainz Jr. and Alexander Albon exceeded their quotas for power unit components and were required to start from the back of the grid. Nico Hülkenberg and Kevin Magnussen received five-place grid penalties for exceeding their quota for power unit components and for a gearbox change, respectively.

== Free practice ==
Lewis Hamilton set the fastest time in first practice with Sebastian Vettel second. Valtteri Bottas was third ahead of Ferrari’s Charles Leclerc in fourth. Second practice was eventful as Vettel spun and both Bottas and Max Verstappen crashed. Leclerc was fastest ahead of Bottas, Pierre Gasly and Hamilton. In third practice Leclerc was fastest again ahead of Hamilton, Bottas and Vettel.

== Qualifying ==
=== Qualifying classification ===
Pos.	No.	Driver	Constructor	Qualifying times			Final grid
Pos.	No.	Driver	Constructor	Q1	Q2	Q3	Final grid
1	16	(Monaco) Charles Leclerc	Ferrari	1:04.138	1:03.378	1:03.003	1
2	44	(United Kingdom) Lewis Hamilton	Mercedes	1:03.818	1:03.803	1:03.262	4^{a}
3	33	(Netherlands) Max Verstappen	Red Bull Racing-Honda	1:03.807	1:03.835	1:03.439	2
4	77	(Finland) Valtteri Bottas	Mercedes	1:04.084	1:03.863	1:03.537	3
5	20	(Denmark) Kevin Magnussen	Haas-Ferrari	1:04.778	1:04.466	1:04.072	10^{b}
6	4	(United Kingdom) Lando Norris	McLaren-Renault	1:04.361	1:04.211	1:04.099	5
7	7	(Finland) Kimi Räikkönen	Alfa Romeo Racing-Ferrari	1:04.615	1:04.056	1:04.166	6
8	99	(Italy) Antonio Giovinazzi	Alfa Romeo Racing-Ferrari	1:04.450	1:04.194	1:04.179	7
9	10	(France) Pierre Gasly	Red Bull Racing-Honda	1:04.412	1:03.988	1:04.199	8
10	5	(Germany) Sebastian Vettel	Ferrari	1:04.340	1:03.667	No time	9
11	8	(France) Romain Grosjean	Haas-Ferrari	1:04.552	1:04.490	N/A	11
12	27	(Germany) Nico Hülkenberg	Renault	1:04.733	1:04.516	N/A	15^{c}
13	23	(Thailand) Alexander Albon	Scuderia Toro Rosso-Honda	1:04.708	1:04.665	N/A	18^{d}
14	3	(Australia) Daniel Ricciardo	Renault	1:04.647	1:04.790	N/A	12
15	55	(Spain) Carlos Sainz Jr.	McLaren-Renault	1:04.453	1:13.601	N/A	19^{d}
16	11	(Mexico) Sergio Pérez	Racing Point-BWT Mercedes	1:04.789	N/A	N/A	13
17	18	(Canada) Lance Stroll	Racing Point-BWT Mercedes	1:04.832	N/A	N/A	14
18	26	(Russia) Daniil Kvyat	Scuderia Toro Rosso-Honda	1:05.324	N/A	N/A	16
19	63	(United Kingdom) George Russell	Williams-Mercedes	1:05.904	N/A	N/A	PL^{e}
20	88	(Poland) Robert Kubica	Williams-Mercedes	1:06.206	N/A	N/A	17
107% time: 1:08.273

Notes

- ^a – Lewis Hamilton received a three-place grid penalty for impeding Kimi Räikkönen during qualifying. However, because of the way the penalties were applied, Hamilton dropped two places instead of three and he would start fourth.
- ^b – Kevin Magnussen received a five-place grid penalty for an unscheduled gearbox change.
- ^c – Nico Hülkenberg received a five-place grid penalty for exceeding his quota for power unit components. However, because of the way the penalties were applied, Hülkenberg dropped three places instead of five and he would start fifteenth.
- ^d – Alexander Albon and Carlos Sainz Jr. were required to start from the back of the grid for exceeding their quotas for power unit components.
- ^e – George Russell received a three-place grid penalty for impeding Daniil Kvyat during qualifying. Additionally, he was required to start from the pit lane for changing his front wing under parc fermé conditions.

== Race ==
=== Race summary ===
Whilst Charles Leclerc started the race well from pole position, Max Verstappen encountered an issue with his anti-stall, dropping from second down to eighth place by turn 2. Lando Norris briefly battled Lewis Hamilton for third place, and Kimi Räikkönen ran as high as fourth. Räikkönen held the position until lap 7, when he was passed by Sebastian Vettel, who had started ninth. By lap 9, Verstappen had recovered after his poor start, passing Räikkönen and Norris. Kevin Magnussen pitted on lap 12, dropping him to the back, but was handed a drive-through penalty soon afterwards after the stewards found he had over-stepped his grid line at the beginning of the race and started too far forward. He would only recover one place during the race, and eventually crossed the finish line in nineteenth.

Valtteri Bottas and Sebastian Vettel pitted on lap 22, with Bottas emerging in clear air in fourth, but with Vettel stuck behind Norris, Räikkönen and Pierre Gasly in eighth after a communication issue saw his pit-stop take longer than expected. Leclerc pitted on the following lap, handing the lead of the race to Hamilton. At this stage of the race, the Mercedes cars were suffering from the high air and track temperatures. Hamilton repeatedly ran wide at turn 1, driving over the sausage kerb. This eventually caused damage to his front wing, forcing him to pit for a replacement on lap 31 and dropping him to fifth place. Verstappen inherited the lead, but pitted on the following lap; Leclerc thus regained first place.

Verstappen emerged from the pits in fourth place, and began his charge towards the front. He passed Vettel on Lap 50, on the straight after turn 2. Vettel subsequently pitted on the following lap. Verstappen then passed Bottas into turn 2 on lap 56. Finally, he caught up with Leclerc at the front, passing him into turn 2 with three laps to go. On lap 69, Verstappen took a wide line through the corner on the inside of Leclerc, making contact and resulting in Leclerc leaving the track and driving over the kerb. Verstappen held on to his lead until the chequered flag, and the stewards later deemed his overtake legal. Vettel passed Hamilton on the final lap to take fourth place.

Verstappen's victory marked the first win for a Honda-powered F1 car since Jenson Button in the 2006 Hungarian Grand Prix. The race was also the first race in the season not to be won by a Mercedes driver, as Valtteri Bottas finished in third and Lewis Hamilton fifth. Antonio Giovinazzi scored his first ever career points in Formula One by finishing tenth place. This also marked the first race in which every driver saw the chequered flag since the 2016 Japanese Grand Prix.

=== Race classification ===
Pos.	No.	Driver	Constructor	Laps	Time/Retired	Grid	Points
1	33	(Netherlands) Max Verstappen	Red Bull Racing-Honda	71	1:22:01.822	2	26^{1}
2	16	(Monaco) Charles Leclerc	Ferrari	71	+2.724	1	18
3	77	(Finland) Valtteri Bottas	Mercedes	71	+18.960	3	15
4	5	(Germany) Sebastian Vettel	Ferrari	71	+19.610	9	12
5	44	(United Kingdom) Lewis Hamilton	Mercedes	71	+22.805	4	10
6	4	(United Kingdom) Lando Norris	McLaren-Renault	70	+1 lap	5	8
7	10	(France) Pierre Gasly	Red Bull Racing-Honda	70	+1 lap	8	6
8	55	(Spain) Carlos Sainz Jr.	McLaren-Renault	70	+1 lap	19	4
9	7	(Finland) Kimi Räikkönen	Alfa Romeo Racing-Ferrari	70	+1 lap	6	2
10	99	(Italy) Antonio Giovinazzi	Alfa Romeo Racing-Ferrari	70	+1 lap	7	1
11	11	(Mexico) Sergio Pérez	Racing Point-BWT Mercedes	70	+1 lap	13	
12	3	(Australia) Daniel Ricciardo	Renault	70	+1 lap	12	
13	27	(Germany) Nico Hülkenberg	Renault	70	+1 lap	15	
14	18	(Canada) Lance Stroll	Racing Point-BWT Mercedes	70	+1 lap	14	
15	23	(Thailand) Alexander Albon	Scuderia Toro Rosso-Honda	70	+1 lap	18	
16	8	(France) Romain Grosjean	Haas-Ferrari	70	+1 lap	11	
17	26	(Russia) Daniil Kvyat	Scuderia Toro Rosso-Honda	70	+1 lap	16	
18	63	(United Kingdom) George Russell	Williams-Mercedes	69	+2 laps	PL	
19	20	(Denmark) Kevin Magnussen	Haas-Ferrari	69	+2 laps	10	
20	88	(Poland) Robert Kubica	Williams-Mercedes	68	+3 laps	17	
Fastest lap: (Netherlands) Max Verstappen (Red Bull Racing-Honda) - 1:07.475 (lap 60)

Notes

- ^1 – Includes one point for fastest lap.

== Championship standings after the race ==
Drivers' Championship standings

	Pos.	Driver	Points
	1	(United Kingdom) Lewis Hamilton	197
	2	(Finland) Valtteri Bottas	166
1	3	(Netherlands) Max Verstappen	126
1	4	(Germany) Sebastian Vettel	123
	5	(Monaco) Charles Leclerc	105

Constructors' Championship standings

Pos.	Constructor	Points
1	(Germany) Mercedes	363
2	(Italy) Ferrari	228
3	(Austria) Red Bull Racing-Honda	169
4	(United Kingdom) McLaren-Renault	52
5	(France) Renault	32

- Note: Only the top five positions are included for both sets of standings.

== See also ==
- 2019 Spielberg Formula 2 round
- 2019 Spielberg Formula 3 round

Previous race: 2019 French Grand Prix	FIA Formula One World Championship; 2019 season	Next race: 2019 British Grand Prix
Previous race: 2018 Austrian Grand Prix	Austrian Grand Prix	Next race: 2020 Austrian Grand Prix
