= 2018 Azerbaijan Grand Prix =

Race 4 of 21 in the 2018 Formula One World Championship
← Previous race	Next race →
- Layout of the Baku City Circuit

Race details
- Date: 29 April 2018
- Official name: Formula 1 Rolex Azerbaijan Grand Prix
- Location: Baku City Circuit; Baku, Azerbaijan
- Course: Temporary street circuit
- Course length: 6.003 km (3.730 miles)
- Distance: 51 laps, 306.049 km (190.170 miles)
- Weather: Cloudy

Pole position
Driver	(Germany) Sebastian Vettel	Ferrari
- Time: 1:41.498

Fastest lap
Driver	(Finland) Valtteri Bottas	Mercedes
- Time: 1:45.149 on lap 37

Podium
First	(United Kingdom) Lewis Hamilton	Mercedes
Second	(Finland) Kimi Räikkönen	Ferrari
Third	(Mexico) Sergio Pérez	Force India-Mercedes

The 2018 Azerbaijan Grand Prix (formally known as the Formula 1 2018 Azerbaijan Grand Prix) was a Formula One motor race held on 29 April 2018 at the Baku City Circuit in Baku, Azerbaijan. The race was the 4th round of the 2018 Formula One World Championship, the 2nd running of the Azerbaijan Grand Prix as a round of the Formula One World Championship and the 3rd time the Baku City Circuit was being used to host a Formula One race.

Red Bull Racing driver Daniel Ricciardo was the defending race winner. Ferrari's Sebastian Vettel entered the round with a nine-point lead over Lewis Hamilton in the World Drivers' Championship. In the World Constructors' Championship, Mercedes started the round with a one-point lead over Ferrari.

Charles Leclerc finished 6th and became the first Monégasque driver to score a point since Louis Chiron in the 1950 Monaco Grand Prix. Brendon Hartley finished 10th and became the first driver from New Zealand to score a point since Chris Amon in the 1976 Spanish Grand Prix. Sergio Pérez finished 3rd; this would prove to be the final podium for Force India.

== Background ==
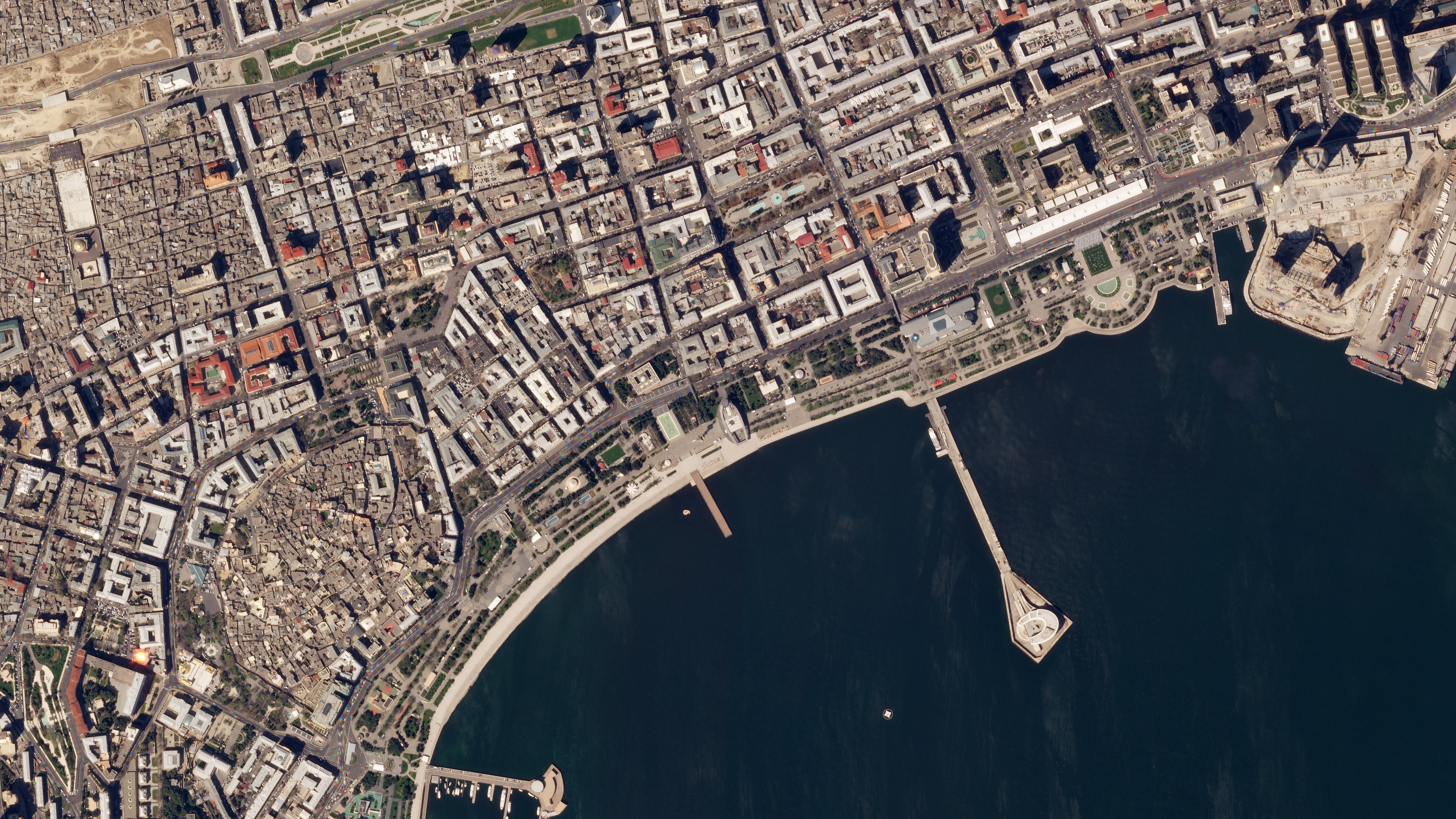
The Baku City Circuit in 2018

The race was brought forward from its June date to avoid clashing with celebrations for the centenary of the Azerbaijan republic. The race filled the berth taken by the Russian Grand Prix, which was moved to a September date. The vacancy created in June was filled by the newly revived French Grand Prix.

The Pirelli tyre compounds selected for the 2018 Azerbaijan Grand Prix were, in order of most hard to least, the soft (yellow), super-soft (red), and ultra-soft (purple).

== Qualifying ==
In the last minute of Q3 shootout, Kimi Räikkönen almost claimed pole position but he made a mistake on the exit of the final corner, instead settling for P6. That mistake allowed Sebastian Vettel to keep his pole position.

=== Qualifying classification ===
Pos.	No.	Driver	Constructor	Qualifying times			Final grid
Pos.	No.	Driver	Constructor	Q1	Q2	Q3	Final grid
1	5	(Germany) Sebastian Vettel	Ferrari	1:42.762	1:43.015	1:41.498	1
2	44	(United Kingdom) Lewis Hamilton	Mercedes	1:42.693	1:42.676	1:41.677	2
3	77	(Finland) Valtteri Bottas	Mercedes	1:43.355	1:42.679	1:41.837	3
4	3	(Australia) Daniel Ricciardo	Red Bull Racing-TAG Heuer	1:42.857	1:43.482	1:41.911	4
5	33	(Netherlands) Max Verstappen	Red Bull Racing-TAG Heuer	1:42.642	1:42.901	1:41.994	5
6	7	(Finland) Kimi Räikkönen	Ferrari	1:42.538	1:42.510	1:42.490	6
7	31	(France) Esteban Ocon	Force India-Mercedes	1:43.021	1:42.967	1:42.523	7
8	11	(Mexico) Sergio Pérez	Force India-Mercedes	1:43.992	1:43.366	1:42.547	8
9	27	(Germany) Nico Hülkenberg	Renault	1:43.746	1:43.232	1:43.066	14^{a}
10	55	(Spain) Carlos Sainz Jr.	Renault	1:43.426	1:43.464	1:43.351	9
11	18	(Canada) Lance Stroll	Williams-Mercedes	1:44.359	1:43.585		10
12	35	(Russia) Sergey Sirotkin	Williams-Mercedes	1:44.261	1:43.886		11
13	14	(Spain) Fernando Alonso	McLaren-Renault	1:44.010	1:44.019		12
14	16	(Monaco) Charles Leclerc	Sauber-Ferrari	1:43.752	1:44.074		13
15	20	(Denmark) Kevin Magnussen	Haas-Ferrari	1:43.674	1:44.759		15
16	2	(Belgium) Stoffel Vandoorne	McLaren-Renault	1:44.489			16
17	10	(France) Pierre Gasly	Scuderia Toro Rosso-Honda	1:44.496			17
18	9	(Sweden) Marcus Ericsson	Sauber-Ferrari	1:45.541			18
107% time: 1:49.715
—	28	(New Zealand) Brendon Hartley	Scuderia Toro Rosso-Honda	1:57.354			19^{b}
—	8	(France) Romain Grosjean	Haas-Ferrari	No time			20^{b}

Notes

- ^a – Nico Hülkenberg received a five-place grid penalty for an unscheduled gearbox change.
- ^b – Brendon Hartley and Romain Grosjean failed to set a Q1 time within the 107% requirement and raced at the stewards' discretion. Grosjean also received a five-place grid penalty for an unscheduled gearbox change.

== Race ==
=== Race report ===
==== Start ====
All drivers got off the line from the standing start without incident. A minor racing incident which led to contact between Kimi Räikkönen and Esteban Ocon occurred as both navigated turn 2. On the straight after turn 2, Sirotkin's car made contact with Fernando Alonso's McLaren and Nico Hulkenberg's Renault, and caused a double tyre puncture (to Alonso's front right and rear right tyres), and puncture to Sirotkin's front left tyre as well as suspension damage. In the chaos, Force India's Sergio Pérez struck the back of Räikkönen's car, causing him to make a pit stop. The first major contact in the race was again between Kimi Räikkönen and Esteban Ocon at turn 3, Ocon suffered damage sufficient to force his immediate retirement from the race. Sergey Sirotkin's tyre puncture caused him to stop near the turn 3 Räikkönen–Ocon incident. Ocon and Sirotkin's positions on the track caused a first lap safety car. During the safety car, numerous drivers pitted due to damage, including Räikkönen (front wing change) Pérez (front wing change), Alonso (two tyre punctures, front wing change), and Kevin Magnussen (two tyre punctures). Several safety car laps were needed to clear retired cars and carbon fibre debris from the track. Pérez received a five-second penalty for the contact with Räikkönen, which he served at his first pit stop.

The top five drivers restarted in qualifying order, at the lap 6 restart. Carlos Sainz's Renault, which qualified 10th, showed notable early race strength and was in 5th by lap 7. 4th place Red Bull driver Max Verstappen reported issues with his KERS battery after the restart, allowing the top three runners to pull away while a long queue of cars built behind him. The two factory Renaults of Sainz and Nico Hülkenberg soon passed Verstappen to take 4th and 5th. On lap 11, Hülkenberg's rear end came out and struck the wall at turn 4, forcing him to retire.

==== Mid-race ====
After Hulkenberg's retirement, the race approached a more typical Formula One race rhythm. Sainz pitted from 4th with worn ultrasoft tyres, and the Red Bulls of Daniel Ricciardo and Max Verstappen raced 4th and 5th for several laps, occasionally exchanging positions. Carlos dropped to 9th after his pitstop, he proceeded to fit the soft tyre but this turned out to be a blunder of a strategy because the tyres would not heat meaning that he had been overcut by both Red Bulls and was fighting for low points. The top three drivers (Sebastian Vettel, Ferrari; Lewis Hamilton, Mercedes; and Valtteri Bottas, Mercedes) raced within 10 seconds of each other, 4th place Red Bull Verstappen, meanwhile, was 30 seconds behind race leader Vettel by lap 18. Hamilton switched out worn supersoft tyres for softs on lap 23. Bottas, meanwhile stayed out for a long stint on supersoft tyres. Race leader Vettel pitted for soft tyres on lap 31, intending to finish the race on them, leaving Bottas in the race lead (but still needing to pit). At this point, the main question for the race leaders was whether Bottas could build enough of a gap to pit for ultrasoft tyres and then threaten Vettel for the race win. Red Bull teammates Verstappen and Ricciardo continued close racing, with more position changes and overtaking one another in laps 27 and 28, then again as Ricciardo passed Verstappen to retake 4th place on lap 35. Both Red Bull drivers pitted shortly after the lap 35 pass for fresh ultrasoft tyres.

==== Lap 40 ====
The tempo of the race was completely changed on lap 40, when Red Bull teammates Verstappen and Ricciardo (then in 4th and 5th place, respectively), made major contact. Verstappen, who had just passed Ricciardo due to an overcut during a tyre change pitstop, made a late defensive move to cover an attempted overtake by Ricciardo which caused a collision between the pair. The collision was sufficient to retire both drivers, leave them both disabled on track, and force the race's second safety car. Several drivers in the top 10 took advantage of the situation; before the safety car bunched the drivers together, race leader Bottas made his long-awaited single pit stop for new ultrasoft tyres on which to finish the race, and second place Vettel, third place Hamilton, and fourth place Raikkonen also all pitted for new ultrasofts. Fifth place Force India driver Sergio Pérez chose fresh supersoft tyres. On lap 43, while still under the safety car, 6th place Haas driver Romain Grosjean lost traction and hit the wall, forcing his retirement and extending the length of the safety car stint.

The safety car could not pull in until lap 48, and Bottas kept the race lead as the lap began. 2nd placed Vettel attempted an aggressive move to pass Bottas, locked his wheels up and overshot the turn, ultimately leaving him in 4th place with flat-spotted tyres behind Bottas, Hamilton, and Raikkonen. Just as lap 49 began, Bottas, leading the race by more than one second over Hamilton, suffered a tyre puncture and was forced to retire. At the same time, Force India's Pérez passed Vettel to gain a 3rd place podium position as Bottas dropped out.

==== Finish ====
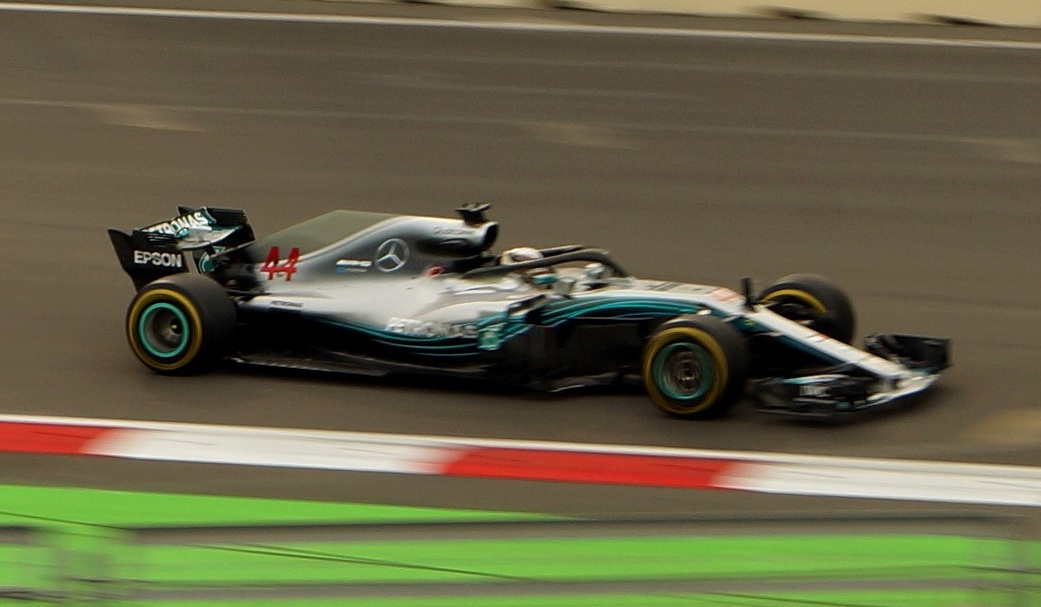
Hamilton passed Bottas near the end of the race to take his first victory of the season.

Bottas's sudden retirement was the last incident that affected the podium order. Hamilton won, Raikkonen was second, and Pérez third. Other notable points finishers included Renault's Sainz in fifth, Sauber's Charles Leclerc, and Toro Rosso's Brendon Hartley (who both earned the first Formula One championship points of their careers). McLaren drivers Fernando Alonso and Stoffel Vandoorne also both managed to earn points: Alonso finished seventh despite the double puncture he suffered early in the race; while Vandoorne used the safety car situation to his advantage. After having raced almost the entire afternoon in one of the last few places following an unscheduled extra pit stop due to damaged tyres, while all drivers were suffering with dropping tyre temperatures, Vandoorne opted to make a fourth pit stop from 13th place the lap before the safety car returned to the pits. With his heated tyres. he was able to move from 14th to ninth after the restart.

=== Post-race ===
From this Grand Prix onwards, the FIA switched to conducting interviews in the parc fermé area immediately after weigh-in. Drivers are interviewed in order of arrival, not necessarily in order of finish.

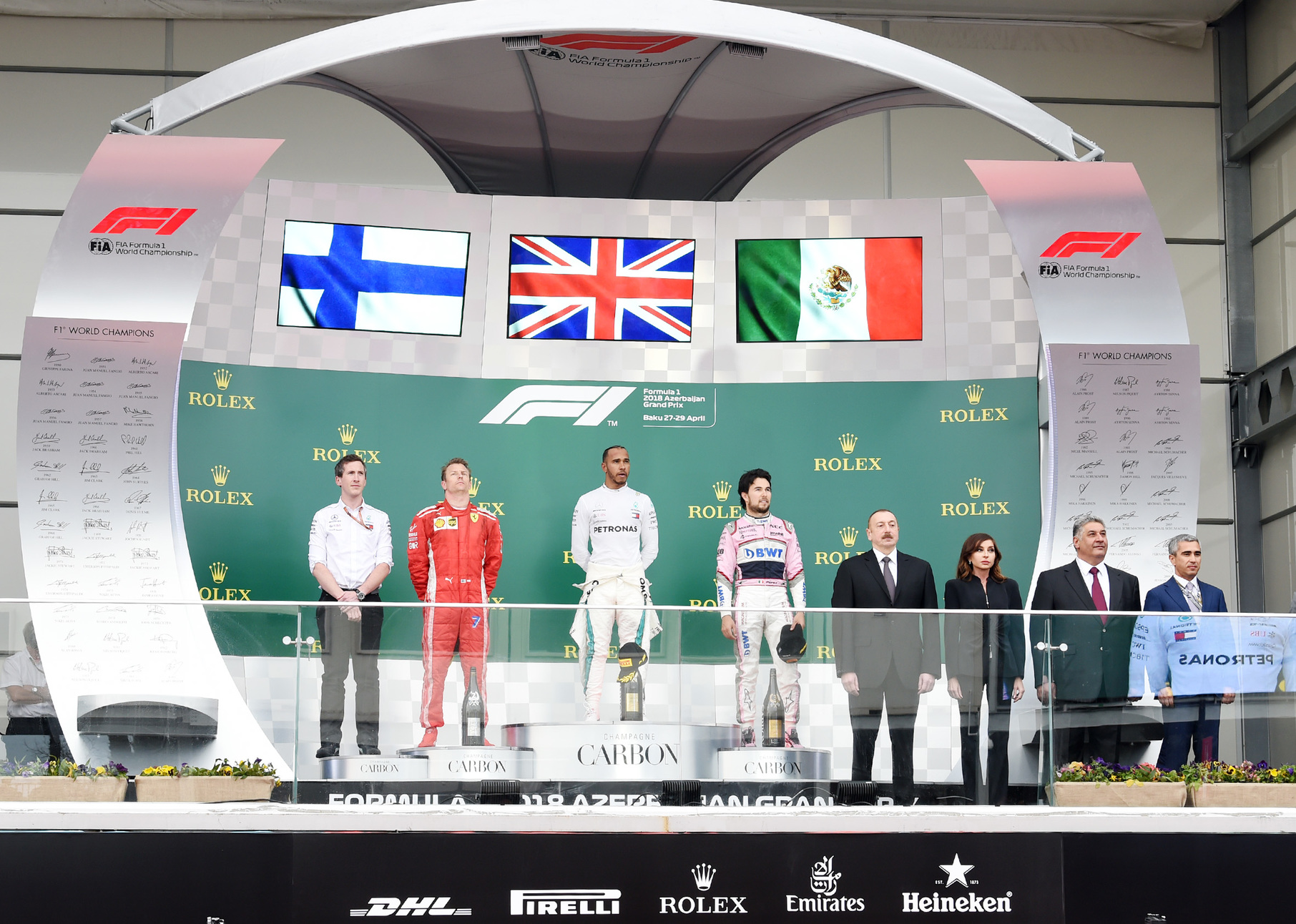
The podium ceremony

Race winner Lewis Hamilton expressed surprise at his race win, and gave high praise to his teammate's performance. "Valtteri (Bottas) deserved to win, he did an exceptional job and had a faultless drive. ... I would not have got by him in the remaining laps if he hadn't had his tyre blow."

Red Bull team boss Christian Horner was reported to have been very angry after the lap 40 crash that forced the retirement of both his drivers, and called the contact "unacceptable". Horner required both Verstappen and Ricciardo to apologize to all members of the Red Bull staff for the incident. Both drivers received an official reprimand from the FIA for the crash in Baku. Verstappen and Ricciardo's crash drew comparisons to the 2010 Turkish Grand Prix, where then-teammates Mark Webber and Sebastian Vettel made contact with each other. In that race, Vettel was forced to retire immediately with a tyre puncture, and Webber managed only 3rd place in a race Red Bull had dominated up to that point.

=== Race classification ===
Pos.	No.	Driver	Constructor	Laps	Time/Retired	Grid	Points
1	44	(United Kingdom) Lewis Hamilton	Mercedes	51	1:43:44.291	2	25
2	7	(Finland) Kimi Räikkönen	Ferrari	51	+2.460	6	18
3	11	(Mexico) Sergio Pérez	Force India-Mercedes	51	+4.024	8	15
4	5	(Germany) Sebastian Vettel	Ferrari	51	+5.329	1	12
5	55	(Spain) Carlos Sainz Jr.	Renault	51	+7.515	9	10
6	16	(Monaco) Charles Leclerc	Sauber-Ferrari	51	+9.158	13	8
7	14	(Spain) Fernando Alonso	McLaren-Renault	51	+10.931	12	6
8	18	(Canada) Lance Stroll	Williams-Mercedes	51	+12.546	10	4
9	2	(Belgium) Stoffel Vandoorne	McLaren-Renault	51	+14.152	16	2
10	28	(New Zealand) Brendon Hartley	Scuderia Toro Rosso-Honda	51	+18.030	19	1
11	9	(Sweden) Marcus Ericsson	Sauber-Ferrari	51	+18.512	18	
12	10	(France) Pierre Gasly	Scuderia Toro Rosso-Honda	51	+24.720	17	
13	20	(Denmark) Kevin Magnussen	Haas-Ferrari	51	+40.663^{1}	15	
14^{2}	77	(Finland) Valtteri Bottas	Mercedes	48	Puncture	3	
Ret	8	(France) Romain Grosjean	Haas-Ferrari	42	Accident	20	
Ret	33	(Netherlands) Max Verstappen	Red Bull Racing-TAG Heuer	39	Collision	5	
Ret	3	(Australia) Daniel Ricciardo	Red Bull Racing-TAG Heuer	39	Collision	4	
Ret	27	(Germany) Nico Hülkenberg	Renault	10	Accident	14	
Ret	31	(France) Esteban Ocon	Force India-Mercedes	0	Collision	7	
Ret	35	(Russia) Sergey Sirotkin	Williams-Mercedes	0	Collision	11	

Notes

- ^1 – Kevin Magnussen had ten seconds added to his race time for causing an avoidable collision. His final grid place was not affected as he was classified in the last position anyway.
- ^2 – Valtteri Bottas did not finish the race but was classified as he completed 90% of the winner's race distance.

== Championship standings after the race ==
Drivers' Championship standings

	Pos.	Driver	Points
1	1	(United Kingdom) Lewis Hamilton	70
1	2	(Germany) Sebastian Vettel	66
2	3	(Finland) Kimi Räikkönen	48
1	4	(Finland) Valtteri Bottas	40
1	5	(Australia) Daniel Ricciardo	37

Constructors' Championship standings

	Pos.	Constructor	Points
1	1	(Italy) Ferrari	114
1	2	(Germany) Mercedes	110
	3	(Austria) Red Bull Racing-TAG Heuer	55
	4	(United Kingdom) McLaren-Renault	36
	5	(France) Renault	35

- Note: Only the top five positions are included for both sets of standings.

== See also ==
- 2018 Baku FIA Formula 2 round

Previous race: 2018 Chinese Grand Prix	FIA Formula One World Championship; 2018 season	Next race: 2018 Spanish Grand Prix
Previous race: 2017 Azerbaijan Grand Prix	Azerbaijan Grand Prix	Next race: 2019 Azerbaijan Grand Prix
