= Formula One drivers from Monaco =

List of Formula One drivers who competed as Monégasque

- Drivers: 5
- Grands Prix: 230
- Entries: 231
- Starts: 222
- Best season finish: 2nd (2022)
- Wins: 9
- Podiums: 57
- Pole positions: 27
- Fastest laps: 15
- Points: 1921
- First entry: 1950 British Grand Prix
- First win: 2019 Belgian Grand Prix
- Latest win: 2026 British Grand Prix
- Latest entry: 2026 Mexico City Grand Prix
- 2026 drivers: Charles Leclerc

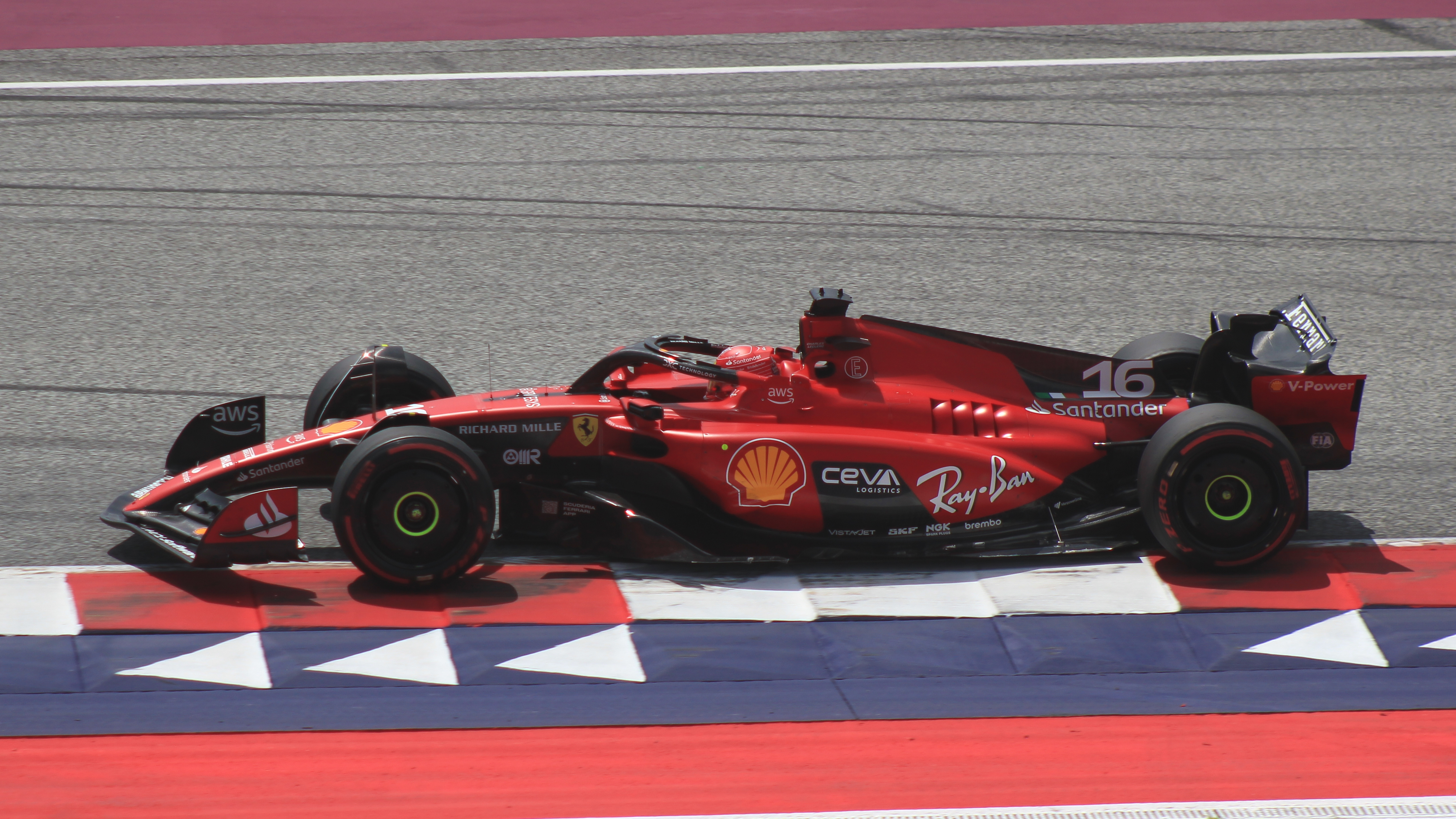
Charles Leclerc in a Ferrari at the 2023 Austrian Grand Prix

There have been five Formula One drivers from Monaco.

== Current drivers ==
Charles Leclerc currently competes for Scuderia Ferrari. He made his Formula One debut for Sauber at the 2018 Australian Grand Prix. In the 2018 season he finished a season high of sixth in Azerbaijan and finished the season on 39 points. He is the first Monégasque driver to win a Formula One race, which he achieved at the 2019 Belgian Grand Prix, the first Monégasque to win the Monaco Grand Prix in the Formula One era, and the first Monégasque driver to start a race from pole position, set a fastest lap, or lead the World Drivers' Championship standings. Leclerc signed a new long-term contract with Ferrari in June 2026.

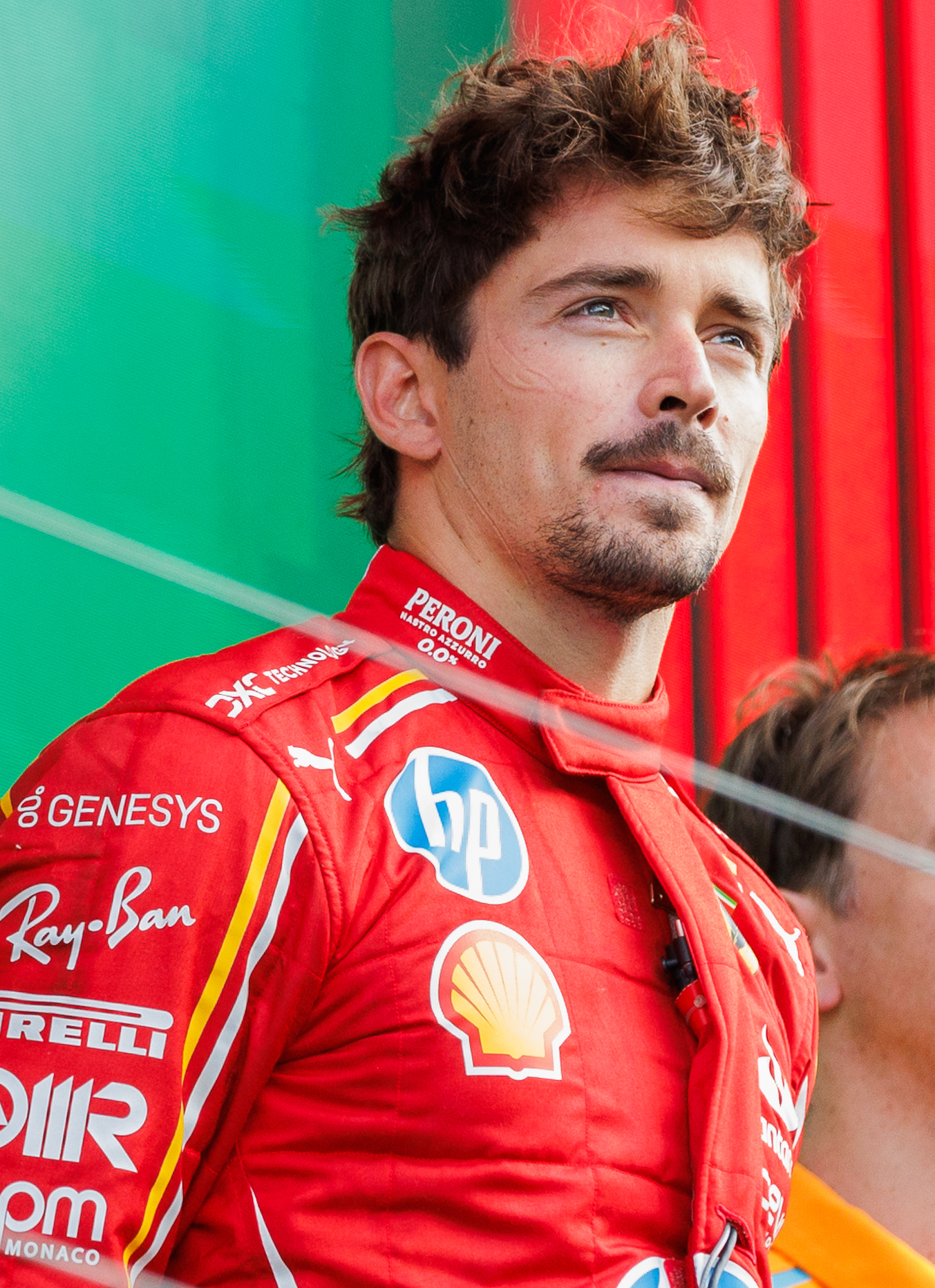
Charles Leclerc
2026 season position: 5th

== Former drivers ==
Louis Chiron was Monaco's first Formula One driver. He is better known for his pre-war efforts in motorsport, having won 21 Grands Prix (including the 1931 Monaco Grand Prix) before the World Championship began in 1950. He was 50 when the first World Championship Grand Prix came around. His only points finish was a 3rd at his home race in Monaco in 1950. He did the full 1951 season bar the Indy 500 and only made sporadic appearances after that. He is still the oldest person to take part in a grand prix being 55 years when he competed in the 1955 Monaco Grand Prix, he is also the oldest person to enter a race when he entered the 1958 Monaco Grand Prix.

André Testut entered in his home race on 2 occasions – 1958 and 1959. Both times he failed to qualify his privateer Maserati 250F.

35 years after Testut failed to make the grid in 1959, Olivier Beretta was signed by Larrousse for the 1994 season. He competed in 10 Grands Prix with a best result of 7th at the German Grand Prix before his sponsorship money ran out and was replaced with Philippe Alliot. He finished 8th in his only attempt at his home race. He later switched his focus to sports-cars.

Dutch-born Robert Doornbos competed under a Monegasque license due to FIA license regulation in 2005. He only competed in the last 8 races of the season with a highest finishing position of thirteenth meaning he finished last in the championship with no points. He would represent the Netherlands in 2006.

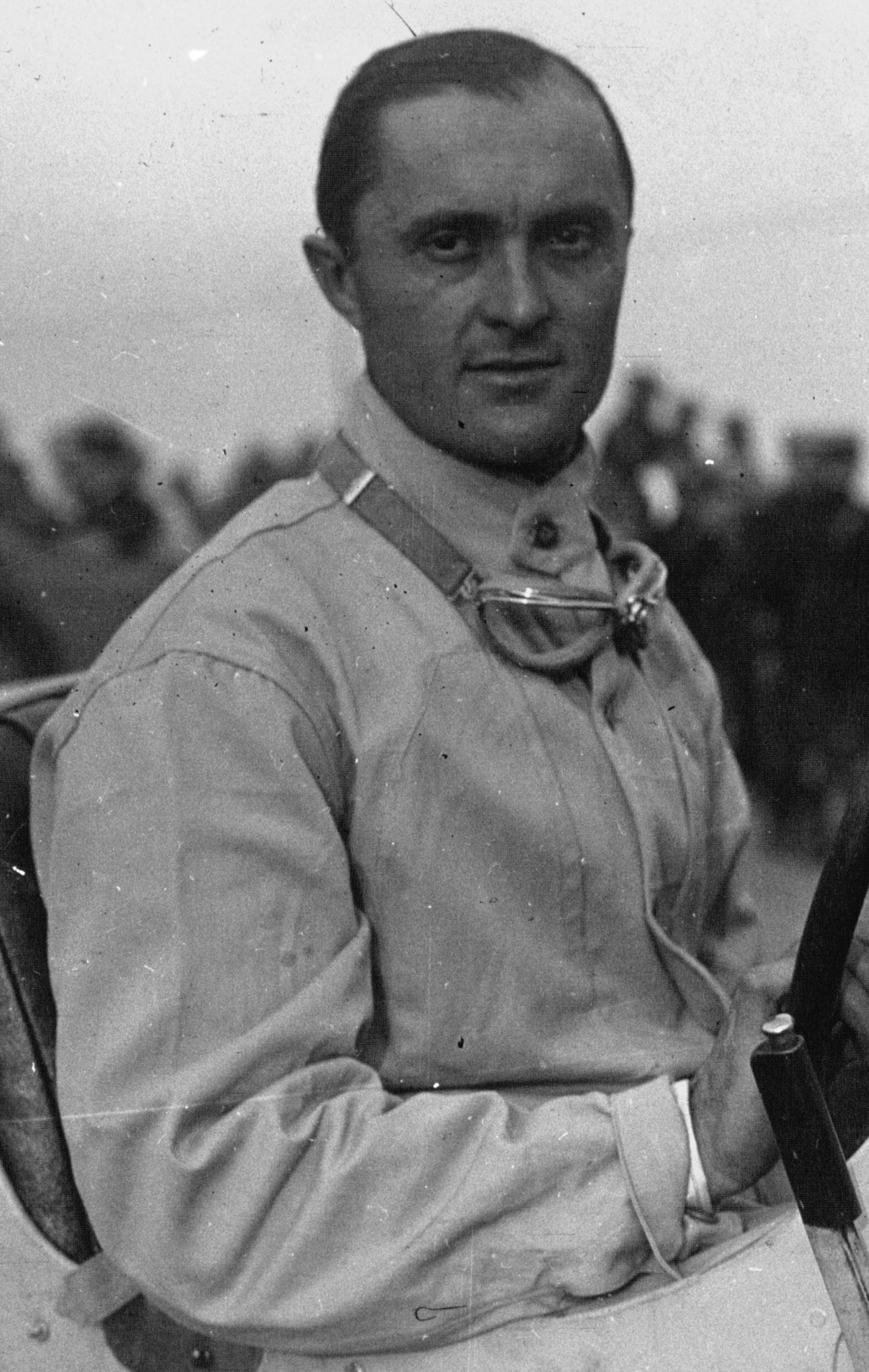
Louis Chiron

== Timeline ==
Drivers	Active Years	Entries	Wins	Podiums	Career Points	Poles	Fastest Laps
Louis Chiron	1950–1951, 1953, 1955–1956, 1958	19 (15 starts)	0	1	4	0	0
André Testut	1958–1959	2 (0 starts)	0	0	0	0	0
Olivier Beretta	1994	10 (9 starts)	0	0	0	0	0
Robert Doornbos	2005*	8	0	0	0	0	0
Charles Leclerc	2018–2026	192 (190 starts)	9	56	1917	27	15

* Doornbos competed under a Dutch racing license in 2006

== See also ==
- List of Formula One Grand Prix winners
- List of Formula One drivers
