= 2019 Hungarian Grand Prix =

Race 12 of 21 in the 2019 Formula One World Championship
← Previous race	Next race →
- Layout of the Hungaroring circuit

Race details
- Date: 4 August 2019
- Official name: Formula 1 Rolex Magyar Nagydíj 2019
- Location: Hungaroring; Mogyoród, Hungary
- Course: Permanent racing facility
- Course length: 4.381 km (2.722 miles)
- Distance: 70 laps, 306.630 km (190.531 miles)
- Weather: Sunny
- Attendance: 230,000

Pole position
Driver	(Netherlands) Max Verstappen	Red Bull Racing-Honda
- Time: 1:14.572

Fastest lap
Driver	(Netherlands) Max Verstappen	Red Bull Racing-Honda
- Time: 1:17.103 on lap 69

Podium
First	(United Kingdom) Lewis Hamilton	Mercedes
Second	(Netherlands) Max Verstappen	Red Bull Racing-Honda
Third	(Germany) Sebastian Vettel	Ferrari

The 2019 Hungarian Grand Prix (formally known as the Formula 1 Rolex Magyar Nagydíj 2019) was a Formula One race which was held on 4 August 2019 at the Hungaroring in Mogyoród, Hungary. The race was the 12th round of 21 of the 2019 Formula One World Championship and the 35th running of the Hungarian Grand Prix and the 34th time the race had been run as a World Championship event since the inaugural season in 1950.

The 70-lap race was won by Lewis Hamilton after opting for a two-stop strategy which allowed him to overtake Max Verstappen with four laps to go, despite Verstappen led the majority of the race and took pole position for the first time in his career. The podium was rounded up by Ferrari's Sebastian Vettel in third, just ahead of teammate Charles Leclerc. All cars apart from the top four drivers and retiree Romain Grosjean were lapped by Hamilton at least once.

This was also Pierre Gasly's final race for Red Bull Racing before being demoted to its sister team Toro Rosso following a driver swap with rookie Alexander Albon prior to the next round in Belgium.

== Background ==
=== Entrants ===
The drivers and teams entered were the same as those on the season entry list with no additional stand-in drivers for either the race or practice. Alexander Albon and Pierre Gasly contested their last races for Scuderia Toro Rosso and Red Bull Racing respectively before swapping teams from the next race onward.

=== Championship standings before the race ===
Heading into the weekend it was Lewis Hamilton and Mercedes who held a lead of 41 and 148 points in the drivers and constructors championships respectively. The size of their leads meant that both would still be leading their respective championships after the race regardless of the race result.

== Qualifying ==
Max Verstappen was fastest, becoming the first Dutch Formula 1 driver to be on pole and also the 100th different driver to be on pole in Formula 1 history. He was followed by Mercedes' drivers Valtteri Bottas and Lewis Hamilton.

=== Qualifying classification ===
Pos.	Car no.	Driver	Constructor	Qualifying times			Final grid
Pos.	Car no.	Driver	Constructor	Q1	Q2	Q3	Final grid
1	33	(Netherlands) Max Verstappen	Red Bull Racing-Honda	1:15.817	1:15.573	1:14.572	1
2	77	(Finland) Valtteri Bottas	Mercedes	1:16.078	1:15.669	1:14.590	2
3	44	(United Kingdom) Lewis Hamilton	Mercedes	1:16.068	1:15.548	1:14.769	3
4	16	(Monaco) Charles Leclerc	Ferrari	1:16.337	1:15.792	1:15.043	4
5	5	(Germany) Sebastian Vettel	Ferrari	1:16.452	1:15.885	1:15.071	5
6	10	(France) Pierre Gasly	Red Bull Racing-Honda	1:16.716	1:16.393	1:15.450	6
7	4	(United Kingdom) Lando Norris	McLaren-Renault	1:16.697	1:16.060	1:15.800	7
8	55	(Spain) Carlos Sainz Jr.	McLaren-Renault	1:16.493	1:16.308	1:15.852	8
9	8	(France) Romain Grosjean	Haas-Ferrari	1:16.978	1:16.319	1:16.013	9
10	7	(Finland) Kimi Räikkönen	Alfa Romeo Racing-Ferrari	1:16.506	1:16.518	1:16.041	10
11	27	(Germany) Nico Hülkenberg	Renault	1:16.790	1:16.565	N/A	11
12	23	(Thailand) Alexander Albon	Scuderia Toro Rosso-Honda	1:16.912	1:16.687	N/A	12
13	26	(Russia) Daniil Kvyat	Scuderia Toro Rosso-Honda	1:16.750	1:16.692	N/A	13
14	99	(Italy) Antonio Giovinazzi	Alfa Romeo Racing-Ferrari	1:16.894	1:16.804	N/A	17^{a}
15	20	(Denmark) Kevin Magnussen	Haas-Ferrari	1:16.122	1:17.081	N/A	14
16	63	(United Kingdom) George Russell	Williams-Mercedes	1:17.031	N/A	N/A	15
17	11	(Mexico) Sergio Pérez	Racing Point-BWT Mercedes	1:17.109	N/A	N/A	16
18	3	(Australia) Daniel Ricciardo	Renault	1:17.257	N/A	N/A	20^{b}
19	18	(Canada) Lance Stroll	Racing Point-BWT Mercedes	1:17.542	N/A	N/A	18
20	88	(Poland) Robert Kubica	Williams-Mercedes	1:18.324	N/A	N/A	19
107% time: 1:21.124

Notes

- ^a – Antonio Giovinazzi received a three-place grid penalty for impeding Lance Stroll during qualifying.
- ^b – Daniel Ricciardo was required to start from the back of the grid for exceeding his quota for power unit components.

== Race ==
=== Race report ===
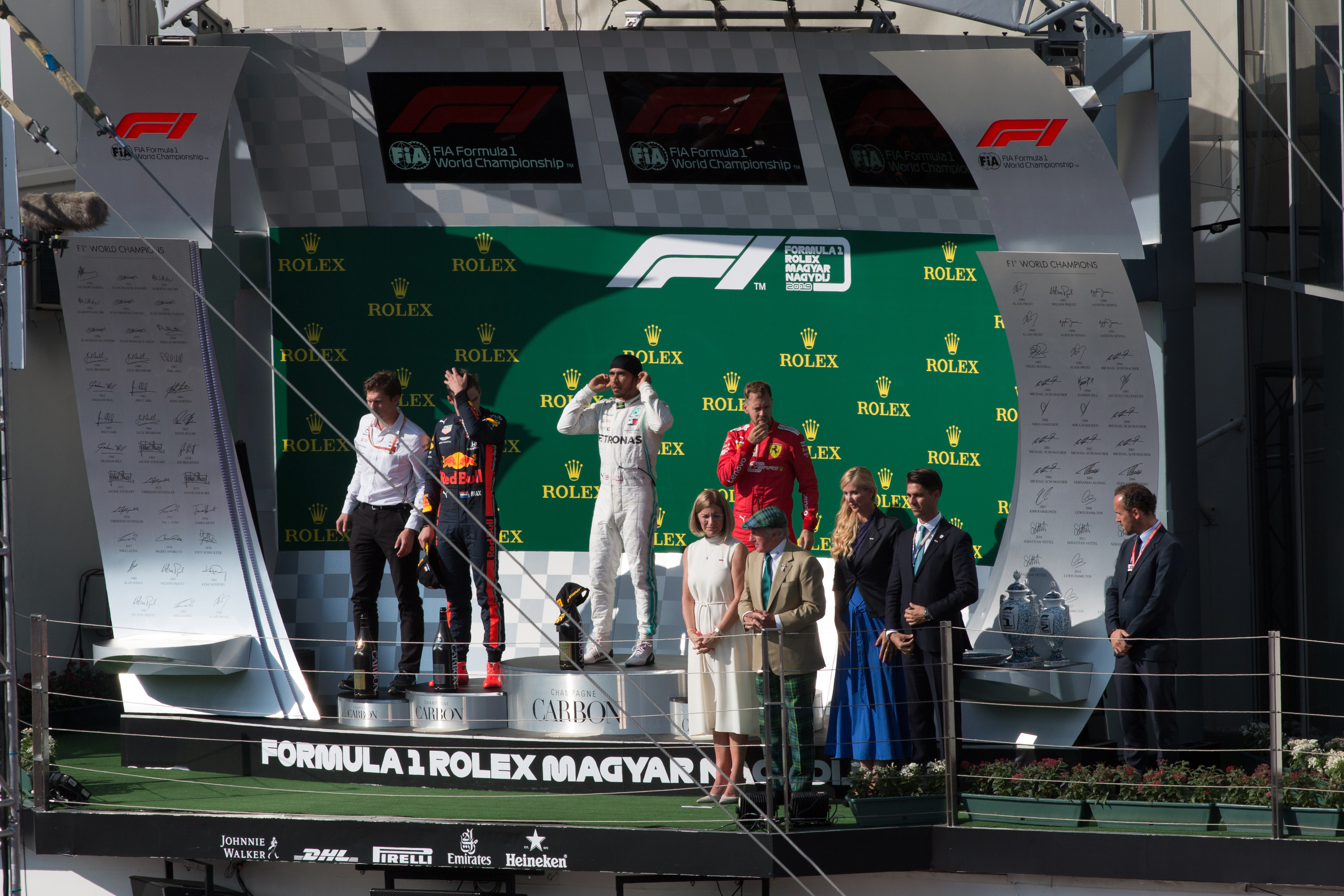
Lewis Hamilton, Max Verstappen, Sebastian Vettel and Mercedes team representative James Vowles on the podium.

Max Verstappen got a reasonable start from pole position but the Mercedes cars of Valtteri Bottas and Lewis Hamilton were both able to attack into turn one, forcing Verstappen to defend on the inside. However, Bottas locked his front right tyre forcing Hamilton to take a wider line through the corner and allowing Verstappen to pull away between turns one and two. Behind the front three cars, Charles Leclerc got a good start and maintained his lead over teammate Sebastian Vettel into turn one but Carlos Sainz managed to get ahead of both Pierre Gasly and Lando Norris to briefly threaten Vettel on the entry to the second corner.

Through turn two, Bottas once again locked his tyres allowing Hamilton to attack around the outside and eventually pass through turn three, albeit with a tap on Bottas's front wing on the exit. The overtaking move forced Bottas slightly wide and onto the kerbs which slowed him enough for Leclerc to challenge on the run up to turn four. As Leclerc passed Bottas, he drifted to the left hitting the same part of the wing that Hamilton had touched moments before, damaging it. The incident was investigated by the stewards but no action was taken.

The damage to his wing hindered Bottas's pace and Vettel was able to overtake on the start finish straight at the start of lap 2. Bottas stayed out for a few more laps but was eventually brought into the pits at the end of lap 6 for a change to the hard tyres and a new front wing, dropping him to last place. At the front, Verstappen and Hamilton began to pull away from the rest of the field. By lap 13 the gap between Hamilton, in second place, and Leclerc, in third, was more than 10 seconds. Whilst the two Ferraris of Leclerc and Vettel were running within a few seconds of each other in third and fourth with the rest of the field lagging a further 17 seconds behind.

By lap 15 Bottas had managed to start making progress through the field and was up to seventeenth place. Just ahead of him Daniel Ricciardo had captured fourteenth place and Sergio Pérez was running in eleventh from his starting position of sixteenth. At the start of lap 19, the two Toro Rosso cars of Daniil Kvyat and Alexander Albon battled side by side all the way through the first sector, running millimetres apart at the exit of turn two, before Kvyat forced Albon onto the run off area after turn four and took twelfth place.

At the front, Verstappen pitted at the end of lap 25 for hard tyres, giving Hamilton a temporary lead. Hamilton then tried to push to overcut Verstappen on pit stop strategy but failed to make ground and was pitted on lap 32 for hard tyres, emerging about 5 seconds behind Verstappen. Immediately Hamilton went on the attack, however the two leading cars had to pick their way through traffic as they lapped slower cars. Whilst this slowed both drivers' progress, the presence of the lapped cars also gave Verstappen DRS allowing him to stay ahead of Hamilton. At the end of lap 38, Verstappen was held up by Ricciardo and then made a small mistake on the exit of turn twelve allowing Hamilton to close to 0.3 seconds. Both had DRS as they started lap 39 but Hamilton managed to pull almost alongside into turn one as they lapped Ricciardo. Unable to make the move, Hamilton continued to fight through turns two and three before launching a brave sortie into turn four that saw him run wide and fall back behind Verstappen.

Throughout the race, Hamilton had been struggling with brake issues, and the prolonged assault on Verstappen had overheated his brakes, forcing the Mercedes to back off through the next few laps. Knowing that they had used the best of the current set of tyres, Mercedes opted to try a two-stop strategy and pitted Hamilton for medium tyres on at the end of lap 48. By now, the gap between second and third place was almost 40 seconds so, with an expected 20 seconds lost due to a pit stop, Hamilton could pit without dropping any positions. Red Bull chose not to respond, fearing that Verstappen would lose position to Hamilton via the undercut.

Both Verstappen and Hamilton had to fight through traffic but, despite some initial gains, Hamilton was 15 seconds behind with 14 laps remaining. On lap 60, Hamilton was 12 seconds behind but then began to reel in Verstappen. On lap 63, Verstappen reported over the team radio that his tyres were "dead" with the gap to Hamilton less than 6 seconds. By the end of lap 66, Hamilton had caught up to Verstappen, easily passed him round the outside through turn one, and pulled away; he maintained the lead to the end of the race. Behind the leaders, the Ferraris of Leclerc and Vettel battled over third place. Ferrari had put their drivers on a split strategy and pitted Vettel a second time for soft tyres which allowed him to pass Leclerc, who was on old hard tyres, at the start of lap 68. Having lost the race lead, Verstappen pitted for soft tyres and proceeded to set the fastest lap of the race, a 1:17.103 which was a new lap record at the time, and thus earned him an extra championship point.

Further down the field, Carlos Sainz came in fifth and Lando Norris managed ninth earning twelve points for McLaren. Kimi Räikkönen came in seventh for Alfa Romeo and Albon secured the last point scoring position of tenth for Toro Rosso. Romain Grosjean was the only retirement, on lap 51 due to a water pressure issue.

Bottas managed to recover to eighth place and Gasly finished sixth but both were scrutinised in the media due to their poor races in comparison to their teammates. Regarding Gasly, Red Bull team principal Christian Horner commented that Red Bull "desperately need him realising more of the potential of the car".

=== After the race ===
Following the Hungarian Grand Prix Red Bull Racing announced that Pierre Gasly would be replaced by Alexander Albon for the remainder of the season, with Gasly taking Albon's seat at Toro Rosso.

=== Race classification ===
Pos.	No.	Driver	Constructor	Laps	Time/Retired	Grid	Points
1	44	(United Kingdom) Lewis Hamilton	Mercedes	70	1:35:03.796	3	25
2	33	(Netherlands) Max Verstappen	Red Bull Racing-Honda	70	+17.796	1	19^{1}
3	5	(Germany) Sebastian Vettel	Ferrari	70	+1:01.433	5	15
4	16	(Monaco) Charles Leclerc	Ferrari	70	+1:05.250	4	12
5	55	(Spain) Carlos Sainz Jr.	McLaren-Renault	69	+1 lap	8	10
6	10	(France) Pierre Gasly	Red Bull Racing-Honda	69	+1 lap	6	8
7	7	(Finland) Kimi Räikkönen	Alfa Romeo Racing-Ferrari	69	+1 lap	10	6
8	77	(Finland) Valtteri Bottas	Mercedes	69	+1 lap	2	4
9	4	(United Kingdom) Lando Norris	McLaren-Renault	69	+1 lap	7	2
10	23	(Thailand) Alexander Albon	Scuderia Toro Rosso-Honda	69	+1 lap	12	1
11	11	(Mexico) Sergio Pérez	Racing Point-BWT Mercedes	69	+1 lap	16	
12	27	(Germany) Nico Hülkenberg	Renault	69	+1 lap	11	
13	20	(Denmark) Kevin Magnussen	Haas-Ferrari	69	+1 lap	14	
14	3	(Australia) Daniel Ricciardo	Renault	69	+1 lap	20	
15	26	(Russia) Daniil Kvyat	Scuderia Toro Rosso-Honda	68	+2 laps	13	
16	63	(United Kingdom) George Russell	Williams-Mercedes	68	+2 laps	15	
17	18	(Canada) Lance Stroll	Racing Point-BWT Mercedes	68	+2 laps	18	
18	99	(Italy) Antonio Giovinazzi	Alfa Romeo Racing-Ferrari	68	+2 laps	17	
19	88	(Poland) Robert Kubica	Williams-Mercedes	67	+3 laps	19	
Ret	8	(France) Romain Grosjean	Haas-Ferrari	49	Water pressure	9	
Fastest lap: (Netherlands) Max Verstappen (Red Bull Racing-Honda) – 1:17.103 (lap 69)

Notes

- ^1 – Includes one point for fastest lap.

== Championship standings after the race ==
Drivers' Championship standings

Pos.	Driver	Points
1	(United Kingdom) Lewis Hamilton	250
2	(Finland) Valtteri Bottas	188
3	(Netherlands) Max Verstappen	181
4	(Germany) Sebastian Vettel	156
5	(Monaco) Charles Leclerc	132

Constructors' Championship standings

Pos.	Constructor	Points
1	(Germany) Mercedes	438
2	(Italy) Ferrari	288
3	(Austria) Red Bull Racing-Honda	244
4	(United Kingdom) McLaren-Renault	82
5	(Italy) Scuderia Toro Rosso-Honda	43

Note

- Only the top five positions for each set of standings are shown

== See also ==
- 2019 Budapest Formula 2 round
- 2019 Budapest Formula 3 round

Previous race: 2019 German Grand Prix	FIA Formula One World Championship; 2019 season	Next race: 2019 Belgian Grand Prix
Previous race: 2018 Hungarian Grand Prix	Hungarian Grand Prix	Next race: 2020 Hungarian Grand Prix
