= 2019 Belgian Grand Prix =

Race 13 of 21 in the 2019 Formula One World Championship
← Previous race	Next race →
- Layout of the Spa-Francorchamps circuit

Race details
- Date: 1 September 2019
- Official name: Formula 1 Johnnie Walker Belgian Grand Prix 2019
- Location: Circuit de Spa-Francorchamps; Stavelot, Belgium
- Course: Permanent racing facility
- Course length: 7.004 km (4.352 miles)
- Distance: 44 laps, 308.052 km (191.415 miles)
- Weather: Partly cloudy
- Attendance: 251,864

Pole position
Driver	(Monaco) Charles Leclerc	Ferrari
- Time: 1:42.519

Fastest lap
Driver	(Germany) Sebastian Vettel	Ferrari
- Time: 1:46.409 on lap 36

Podium
First	(Monaco) Charles Leclerc	Ferrari
Second	(United Kingdom) Lewis Hamilton	Mercedes
Third	(Finland) Valtteri Bottas	Mercedes

The 2019 Belgian Grand Prix (formally known as the Formula 1 Johnnie Walker Belgian Grand Prix 2019) was a Formula One motor race that was held on 1 September 2019 at the Circuit de Spa-Francorchamps in Stavelot, Belgium. The race was the 13th round of the 2019 Formula One World Championship and marked the 75th running of the Belgian Grand Prix, the 52nd time as a round of the World Championship and the 62nd time the race had been held at Spa-Francorchamps.

Charles Leclerc won the race, becoming the first Monegasque driver to win a Formula One Grand Prix, followed by the Mercedes drivers of Lewis Hamilton and Valtteri Bottas. Before and during the race there were several tributes in memory of French driver Anthoine Hubert who had died the previous day during the Formula 2 feature race. Leclerc, a long-time friend of Hubert, dedicated the victory to him.

== Background ==
=== Entrants ===
Alexander Albon and Pierre Gasly swapped their seats for the race, with Albon taking Gasly's place at Red Bull Racing and Gasly returning to Scuderia Toro Rosso to fill the seat vacated by Albon. The rest of the entrants remained unchanged from the Hungarian Grand Prix although Nicholas Latifi drove in the first practice session for Williams, replacing George Russell. Marcus Ericsson did not attend the IndyCar Grand Prix of Portland and travelled to Belgium in case he was needed to stand in for Kimi Räikkönen who had suffered a leg injury over the summer break, but ultimately Räikkönen was able to race.

=== Championship standings before the race ===
Heading into the weekend Lewis Hamilton and his team Mercedes held a 62-point and 150-point leads in their respective championships.

== Qualifying ==
=== Qualifying classification ===
Pos.	Car no.	Driver	Constructor	Qualifying times			Final grid
Pos.	Car no.	Driver	Constructor	Q1	Q2	Q3	Final grid
1	16	(Monaco) Charles Leclerc	Ferrari	1:43.587	1:42.938	1:42.519	1
2	5	(Germany) Sebastian Vettel	Ferrari	1:44.109	1:43.037	1:43.267	2
3	44	(United Kingdom) Lewis Hamilton	Mercedes	1:45.260	1:43.592	1:43.282	3
4	77	(Finland) Valtteri Bottas	Mercedes	1:45.141	1:43.980	1:43.415	4
5	33	(Netherlands) Max Verstappen	Red Bull Racing-Honda	1:44.622	1:44.132	1:43.690	5
6	3	(Australia) Daniel Ricciardo	Renault	1:45.560	1:44.103	1:44.257	10^{a}
7	27	(Germany) Nico Hülkenberg	Renault	1:45.899	1:44.549	1:44.542	12^{a}
8	7	(Finland) Kimi Räikkönen	Alfa Romeo Racing-Ferrari	1:45.842	1:44.140	1:44.557	6
9	11	(Mexico) Sergio Pérez	Racing Point-BWT Mercedes	1:45.732	1:44.707	1:44.706	7
10	20	(Denmark) Kevin Magnussen	Haas-Ferrari	1:45.839	1:44.738	1:45.086	8
11	8	(France) Romain Grosjean	Haas-Ferrari	1:45.694	1:44.797	N/A	9
12	4	(United Kingdom) Lando Norris	McLaren-Renault	1:46.154	1:44.847	N/A	11
13	18	(Canada) Lance Stroll	Racing Point-BWT Mercedes	1:46.000	1:45.047	N/A	16^{b}
14	23	(Thailand) Alexander Albon	Red Bull Racing-Honda	1:45.528	1:45.799	N/A	17^{b}
15	99	(Italy) Antonio Giovinazzi	Alfa Romeo Racing-Ferrari	1:45.637	No time	N/A	18^{b}
16	10	(France) Pierre Gasly	Scuderia Toro Rosso-Honda	1:46.435	N/A	N/A	13
17	55	(Spain) Carlos Sainz Jr.	McLaren-Renault	1:46.507	N/A	N/A	15^{c}
18	26	(Russia) Daniil Kvyat	Scuderia Toro Rosso-Honda	1:46.518	N/A	N/A	19^{b}
19	63	(United Kingdom) George Russell	Williams-Mercedes	1:47.548	N/A	N/A	14
107% time: 1:50.838
—	88	(Poland) Robert Kubica	Williams-Mercedes	No time	N/A	N/A	PL^{d}

Notes

- ^a – Daniel Ricciardo and Nico Hülkenberg both received a five-place grid penalty for exceeding their quota for power unit components.
- ^b – Lance Stroll, Alexander Albon, Antonio Giovinazzi and Daniil Kvyat are required to start from the back of the grid for exceeding their quota for power unit components. Kvyat and Giovinazzi also both received an additional five-place grid penalty for an unscheduled gearbox change.
- ^c – Carlos Sainz Jr. had a 15-place grid penalty for exceeding his quota for power unit components.
- ^d – Robert Kubica failed to set a Q1 time within the 107% requirement. He raced at the stewards' discretion. He started the race from the pit lane for changing power unit components and his rear wing under parc fermé conditions and received an additional 5 place grid penalty for an unscheduled gearbox change. The penalty made no difference as he started from the pit lane.

== Race ==
=== Race report ===
The death of Anthoine Hubert in the Formula 2 feature race on Saturday loomed over the race. A minute of silence was held for Hubert before the start of the race and a standing ovation was organised for lap 19, the same number as his car.

At the start of the race Carlos Sainz suffered a power failure and did not get off the line. Whilst Charles Leclerc got away cleanly, third placed Lewis Hamilton was able to attack second placed Sebastian Vettel on the inside of turn one, pushing the Ferrari off the track, allowing Hamilton to take second place. However, a poor run through turn 5 and the higher top speed of the Ferrari meant that Vettel was able to recover the position on the straight that followed. Although he briefly threatened Vettel when the Ferrari was forced wide after turn 1, Valtteri Bottas settled into fourth behind Hamilton. Behind the first four, Kimi Räikkönen was on the outside of Sergio Pérez on the start-finish straight and did not see Max Verstappen, who had a poor start, on inside and turned into the Red Bull driver at the first corner. Both drivers suffered damage with Verstappen suffering suspension damage, causing him to crash into the barriers on the outside of turn 4. The collision caused the safety car to be released.

Due to the incident, the cars further back had to pick their way around the debris. Lando Norris, who had started eleventh, managed to move into fifth. Daniel Ricciardo was not so lucky as he was tagged on the rear right-hand side by Lance Stroll. The Verstappen-Räikkönen incident led to the safety car being deployed and Sainz, Räikkönen and Ricciardo all made pit stops. Sainz, suffering with a power issue, had a very slow stop, as did Räikkönen when his pit crew could not secure his new front wing. Räikkönen then stopped again at the end of lap 2. Sainz continued to drive slowly and did not catch up the pack after his pit stop, eventually pulling off in the run off area at the final chicane at end of his second lap. This caused the safety car, which was about to be brought back into the pits, to stay out.

The safety car came in for the start of lap 5 and the Ferraris managed to open a gap to Mercedes cars on the restart. Leclerc quickly managed to pull out of DRS range but Vettel stayed ahead of Hamilton who attacked several times before the first pit stops. Radio messages between Hamiton and his engineer revealed that Hamilton did not think Vettel was that quick. However, whilst the Mercedes cars were much stronger than the Ferraris in the second sector, they were not as fast in the first or third sectors, both of which contained the key overtaking spots of the turn 7 and turn 19 respectively.

With Norris running in fifth and Romain Grosjean in sixth, Kevin Magnussen became embroiled in a fight with Pérez over seventh place. The two drivers battled over several laps but eventually Pérez overtook Magnussen on the Kemmel straight on lap 10 and the Haas of Magnussen then quickly fell backwards. Pierre Gasly overtook Magnussen towards end of Kemmel straight on the next lap with Stroll doing the same one lap later.

Gasly pitted on lap 13 and was around a second faster than his new Toro Rosso teammate Daniil Kvyat, showing that undercut could be quite powerful. This led Ferrari to pit Vettel at end of lap 15 for medium tyres. There was a brief window for Mercedes to respond but they chose not to instead pushing on, as did Leclerc. Vettel then set a fastest lap on 17, which included an overtake on Norris, and started taking significant time out of Leclerc, Hamilton and Bottas who had still not pitted. The top three were all on one stop strategies so instead were stretching their tyres. Leclerc pitted at end of 21, Hamilton at end of 22, and Bottas at end of 23. Hamilton lost a second during his stop due to a slow left rear tyre and emerged several seconds behind Leclerc. All three had been jumped by Vettel on pit stop strategy however Leclerc then set a fastest lap on lap 23 and, along with the Mercedes cars, started catching Vettel as tyre degradation took its toll. It quickly became clear that Vettel would likely end up stopping a second time.

At the start of lap 27, Vettel allowed Leclerc to overtake. Hamilton quickly closed on Vettel but struggled to overtake due to the sector speed differences. Eventually, on lap 32, having closed up in sector three on the previous lap, Hamilton was able to make a move into turn seven and pass Vettel but Leclerc had opened a gap of more than six seconds. When Bottas caught up to Vettel as well, Vettel pitted at end of lap 33 for soft tyres, going for the extra point for fastest lap, which he gained on lap 36.

Behind the leaders Alexander Albon, on his debut for Red Bull, carried out a fine recovery race. Having taken a penalty for exceeding his quota for power unit components, he started seventeenth on the grid. When the fifteenth placed Sainz failed to get away, Albon had to take evasive action leading to a loss of position. This was rectified almost immediately in the aftermath of Verstappen-Räikkönen incident as he was able to overtake several slow and damaged cars. Pitting at end of lap 23 for soft tyres, Albon quietly gained places whilst the battle between the Mercedes and Ferraris unfolded. After passing Gasly for ninth place Albon tried to take Ricciardo on the outside of turn 10, on lap 34, but failed to overtake him. He then carried out a switch back move to pass the Renault driver the outside of turn 11. On lap 38, Albon then passed Kvyat at start of Kemmel straight to make it up to seventh leaving him more than ten seconds behind sixth placed Pérez.

Back with the leaders, Hamilton started making gains on Leclerc. The two drivers had to pick their way through traffic in the final laps, slowing both down. However, Hamilton managed to close to less than one second on final lap but was not close enough to make a move. As the leaders entered the second sector, Antonio Giovinazzi crashed and was buried in the wall at turn 12 bringing out yellow flags. Leclerc managed to survive the last few corners to become the first driver to claim a maiden win at Spa since Michael Schumacher at the 1992 Belgian Grand Prix. It was also Ferrari's first victory since Räikkönen at the 2018 United States Grand Prix, with Leclerc the Scuderia's 39th winner and Monaco the 23rd nation to win an F1 race. Bottas finished third with Vettel in fourth, claiming the last fastest lap of his career.

Lando Norris, who had run a quiet race after his first lap jump to fifth, stopped on the start line on his final lap and ended up classified eleventh. At the end of their penultimate lap, Albon had closed onto the back of Pérez at the final chicane which led to an unusual turn 1 as the two drivers slowed down excessively to try and get DRS for the Kemmel straight. Pérez stayed ahead so Albon was able to attack with DRS after Raidillon but had to go onto the grass partway down the Kemmel straight to pass the Racing Point car. The incident was investigated by the stewards after the race but no further action was taken. With Albon finishing fifth, Pérez was sixth, Kvyat seventh, Nico Hülkenberg eight, Gasly ninth and Stroll tenth.

Leclerc dedicated his win to Anthoine Hubert. The podium finishers carried out a notably muted celebration and did not spray champagne on the podium in respect to Hubert.

=== Race classification ===
Pos.	No.	Driver	Constructor	Laps	Time/Retired	Grid	Points
1	16	(Monaco) Charles Leclerc	Ferrari	44	1:23:45.710	1	25
2	44	(United Kingdom) Lewis Hamilton	Mercedes	44	+0.981	3	18
3	77	(Finland) Valtteri Bottas	Mercedes	44	+12.585	4	15
4	5	(Germany) Sebastian Vettel	Ferrari	44	+26.422	2	13^{1}
5	23	(Thailand) Alexander Albon	Red Bull Racing-Honda	44	+1:21.325	17	10
6	11	(Mexico) Sergio Pérez	Racing Point-BWT Mercedes	44	+1:24.448	7	8
7	26	(Russia) Daniil Kvyat	Scuderia Toro Rosso-Honda	44	+1:29.657	19	6
8	27	(Germany) Nico Hülkenberg	Renault	44	+1:46.639	12	4
9	10	(France) Pierre Gasly	Scuderia Toro Rosso-Honda	44	+1:49.168	13	2
10	18	(Canada) Lance Stroll	Racing Point-BWT Mercedes	44	+1:49.838	16	1
11^{2}	4	(United Kingdom) Lando Norris	McLaren-Renault	43	Power loss	11	
12	20	(Denmark) Kevin Magnussen	Haas-Ferrari	43	+1 lap	8	
13	8	(France) Romain Grosjean	Haas-Ferrari	43	+1 lap	9	
14	3	(Australia) Daniel Ricciardo	Renault	43	+1 lap	10	
15	63	(United Kingdom) George Russell	Williams-Mercedes	43	+1 lap	14	
16	7	(Finland) Kimi Räikkönen	Alfa Romeo Racing-Ferrari	43	+1 lap	6	
17	88	(Poland) Robert Kubica	Williams-Mercedes	43	+1 lap	PL	
18^{2}	99	(Italy) Antonio Giovinazzi	Alfa Romeo Racing-Ferrari	42	Accident	18	
Ret	55	(Spain) Carlos Sainz Jr.	McLaren-Renault	1	Power loss	15	
Ret	33	(Netherlands) Max Verstappen	Red Bull Racing-Honda	0	Accident	5	
Fastest lap: (Germany) Sebastian Vettel (Ferrari) – 1:46.409 (lap 36)

Notes

- ^1 – Includes one point for fastest lap.
- ^2 – Lando Norris and Antonio Giovinazzi were classified as they completed more than 90% of the race distance.

== Championship standings after the race ==
Drivers' Championship standings

Pos.	Driver	Points
1	(United Kingdom) Lewis Hamilton	268
2	(Finland) Valtteri Bottas	203
3	(Netherlands) Max Verstappen	181
4	(Germany) Sebastian Vettel	169
5	(Monaco) Charles Leclerc	157

Constructors' Championship standings

Pos.	Constructor	Points
1	(Germany) Mercedes	471
2	(Italy) Ferrari	326
3	(Austria) Red Bull Racing-Honda	254
4	(United Kingdom) McLaren-Renault	82
5	(Italy) Scuderia Toro Rosso-Honda	51

Note

- Only the top five positions for each set of standings are shown

== See also ==
- 2019 Spa-Francorchamps Formula 2 round
- 2019 Spa-Francorchamps Formula 3 round

Previous race: 2019 Hungarian Grand Prix	FIA Formula One World Championship; 2019 season	Next race: 2019 Italian Grand Prix
Previous race: 2018 Belgian Grand Prix	Belgian Grand Prix	Next race: 2020 Belgian Grand Prix
