= 2006 Hungarian Grand Prix =

Coordinates: 47°34′44″N 19°14′55″E

Race 13 of 18 in the 2006 Formula One World Championship
← Previous race	Next race →
- The Hungaroring after being modified in 2003.

Race details
- Date: 6 August 2006
- Official name: Formula 1 Magyar Nagydíj 2006
- Location: Hungaroring, Mogyoród, Pest, Hungary
- Course: Permanent racing facility
- Course length: 4.381 km (2.722 miles)
- Distance: 70 laps, 306.663 km (190.552 miles)
- Weather: Cool and rainy with temperatures reaching up to 20 °C (68 °F)

Pole position
Driver	(Finland) Kimi Räikkönen	McLaren-Mercedes
- Time: 1:19.599

Fastest lap
Driver	(Brazil) Felipe Massa	Ferrari
- Time: 1:23.516 on lap 65

Podium
First	(United Kingdom) Jenson Button	Honda
Second	(Spain) Pedro de la Rosa	McLaren-Mercedes
Third	(Germany) Nick Heidfeld	BMW Sauber

The 2006 Hungarian Grand Prix (officially the Formula 1 Magyar Nagydíj 2006) was a Formula One motor race held on 6 August 2006 at the Hungaroring, Mogyoród, Pest, Hungary. It was the 13th race of the 2006 Formula One season.

Jenson Button won the race driving a Honda, the first victory of his career, the first race win for a British driver since David Coulthard won the Australian Grand Prix three years previously, and the first by an Englishman since Johnny Herbert won the 1999 European Grand Prix nearly seven years previously, in similarly changeable weather circumstances. Pedro de la Rosa finished second for McLaren-Mercedes, the only podium finish of his career, and Nick Heidfeld finished third, giving BMW Sauber their first podium.

It was the first win for Honda as a constructor since John Surtees' victory in the 1967 Italian Grand Prix 39 years prior, the first win for a Honda engine since Gerhard Berger's full-works Honda-powered McLaren triumphed in the 1992 Australian Grand Prix, 14 years and 231 races earlier and the first win for a non-European constructor since Jody Scheckter won with Canadian team Wolf in the 1977 Canadian Grand Prix. The race would also prove to be Honda's only win in their second stint in Formula One as a full constructor, ending in late 2008 after Honda decided to pull out of F1 due to the Great Recession.

It was the last victory for a Honda engine in Formula One until Max Verstappen won the 2019 Austrian Grand Prix for Red Bull. It was also the last victory for Honda as a full constructor entry in Formula One to date. It was also the last all-Michelin podium to date. This was the only race of the season in which neither Renault nor Ferrari took a win or a podium finish. Meanwhile, Robert Kubica became the first Polish driver to enter Formula One.

== Report ==
=== Friday drivers ===
The bottom 6 teams in the 2005 Constructors' Championship and Super Aguri were entitled to run a third car in free practice on Friday. These drivers drove on Friday but did not compete in qualifying or the race. Fabrizio del Monte was originally announced as Midland's third driver.

Constructor	Nat	Driver
Williams-Cosworth	(Austria)	Alexander Wurz
Honda	(United Kingdom)	Anthony Davidson
Red Bull-Ferrari	(Netherlands)	Robert Doornbos
BMW Sauber		-
MF1-Toyota	(Germany)	Markus Winkelhock
Toro Rosso-Cosworth	(Switzerland)	Neel Jani
Super Aguri-Honda		-

=== Practice ===
During Friday practice Fernando Alonso was given a two-second qualifying penalty by the stewards for dangerous driving and overtaking under a yellow flag condition. This meant that two seconds would be added to his times in each part of qualifying. Christijan Albers was given a ten-place grid penalty for an engine change, his second in as many weekends. Jenson Button received the same penalty after having an engine change when his let go in the final practice session.

In a similar situation to Alonso's penalty, Michael Schumacher was given a two-second penalty for overtaking Robert Kubica and Alonso under "red flag" conditions at the end of Saturday's last free practice session. The decision left Schumacher "fuming," with him saying "I blame myself partly for what did happen, but I didn't expect this kind of penalty."

=== Qualifying ===
In qualifying, Kimi Räikkönen achieved pole position with a time of 1:19.599 seconds. Felipe Massa qualified second, with Rubens Barrichello starting the race in third.

=== Race ===
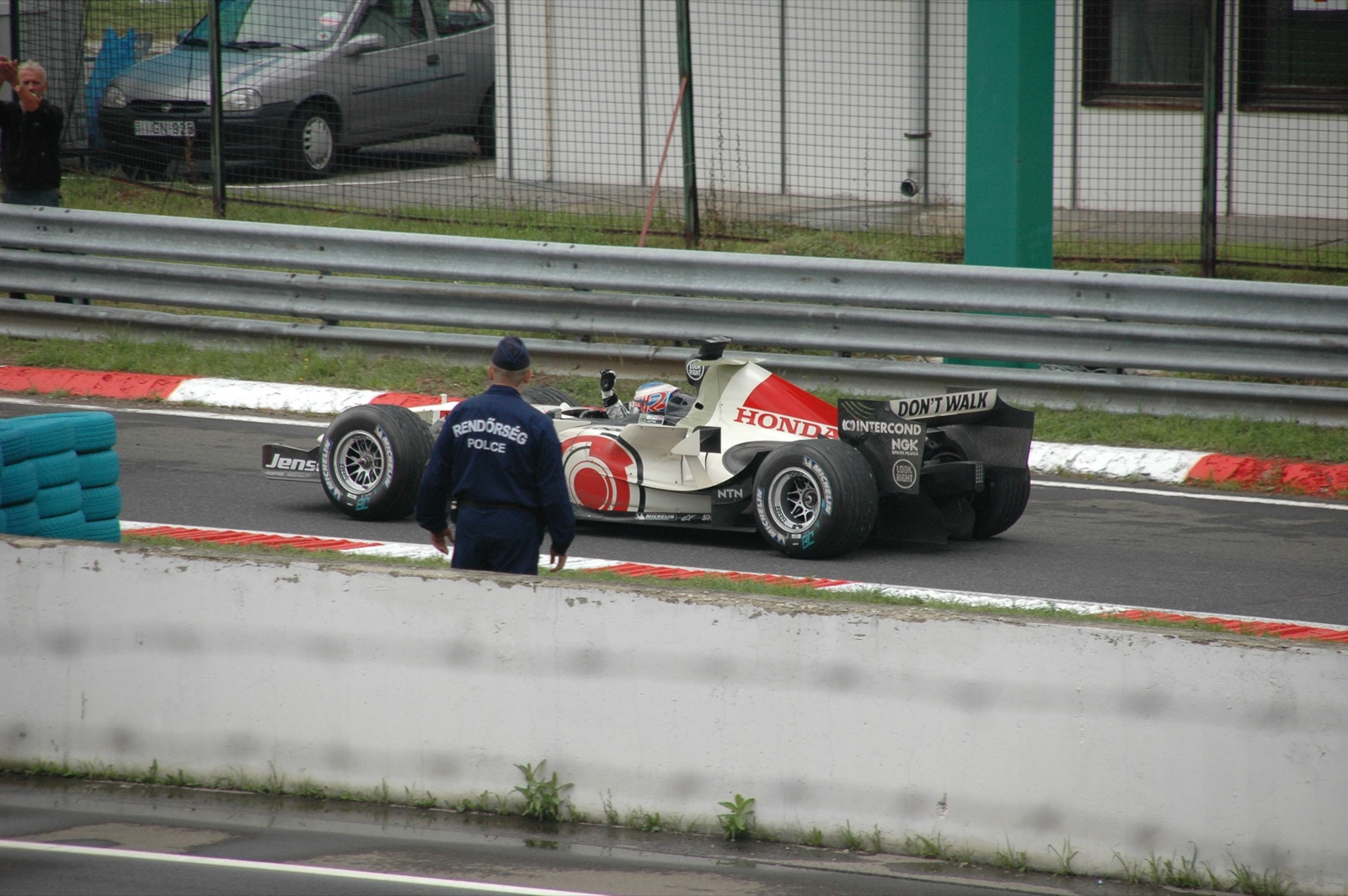
Button returns to the pit lane having won the race.

The track was wet at the start of the race, making it the first wet Hungarian Grand Prix. All drivers started the race on intermediate tyres with the exception of Barrichello, who was on wets. Polesitter Kimi Räikkönen took the lead early on. Alonso and Schumacher made their way through the field with Schumacher up into 6th place from 11th into the first corner, and Alonso climbing from 15th place with a spectacular first hard-fought lap. He went on to pass Schumacher on the outside of turn 5 after a straight fight for several laps and reached 3rd place. He then took the lead after the McLarens of Pedro de la Rosa and Räikkönen pitted. Bridgestone wet-tyres used to dictate the field in non-dry conditions but today it seemed a one-off for the Japanese rubber. All Bridgestone-drivers, including the Ferraris, were seen struggling and seriously down on pace compared to their competitors. Schumacher fell right back in the clutches of Giancarlo Fisichella and lost his front wing battling for 5th place, hitting the Italian mid-corner fighting off snap-oversteer. This forced the German to pit, going a lap down. Soon after Jenson Button overtook Massa, Fisichella and Schumacher in just under the space of 2 laps. Räikkönen struggled on his second set of tyres and ended up crashing into the back of Vitantonio Liuzzi's Toro Rosso, vaulting the car and bringing out the safety car. Alonso then pitted, allowing Schumacher to get back on the lead lap. Another beneficiary of the safety car was Jenson Button, who decided not to pit during the safety car period and climbed up to 2nd place behind Alonso. After the period was over Button began to challenge Alonso, but soon had to pit for fuel. Alonso led, but after a pitstop for dry tyres his right-rear wheel nut detached, causing the Spaniard to lose control and crash. Button inherited the lead and was never challenged from then on. Schumacher made his way up to 2nd by staying on intermediate tyres as others around him pitted for dry weather ones, but this gamble backfired as the cars on drys caught him in the final laps. Schumacher defended his position, including controversially cutting a chicane on consecutive laps without penalty, but Pedro de la Rosa and Nick Heidfeld both ultimately passed him. Whilst he was being overtaken Schumacher banged wheels with Heidfeld, damaging his Ferrari's suspension and forcing him out of the race three laps short of the finish.

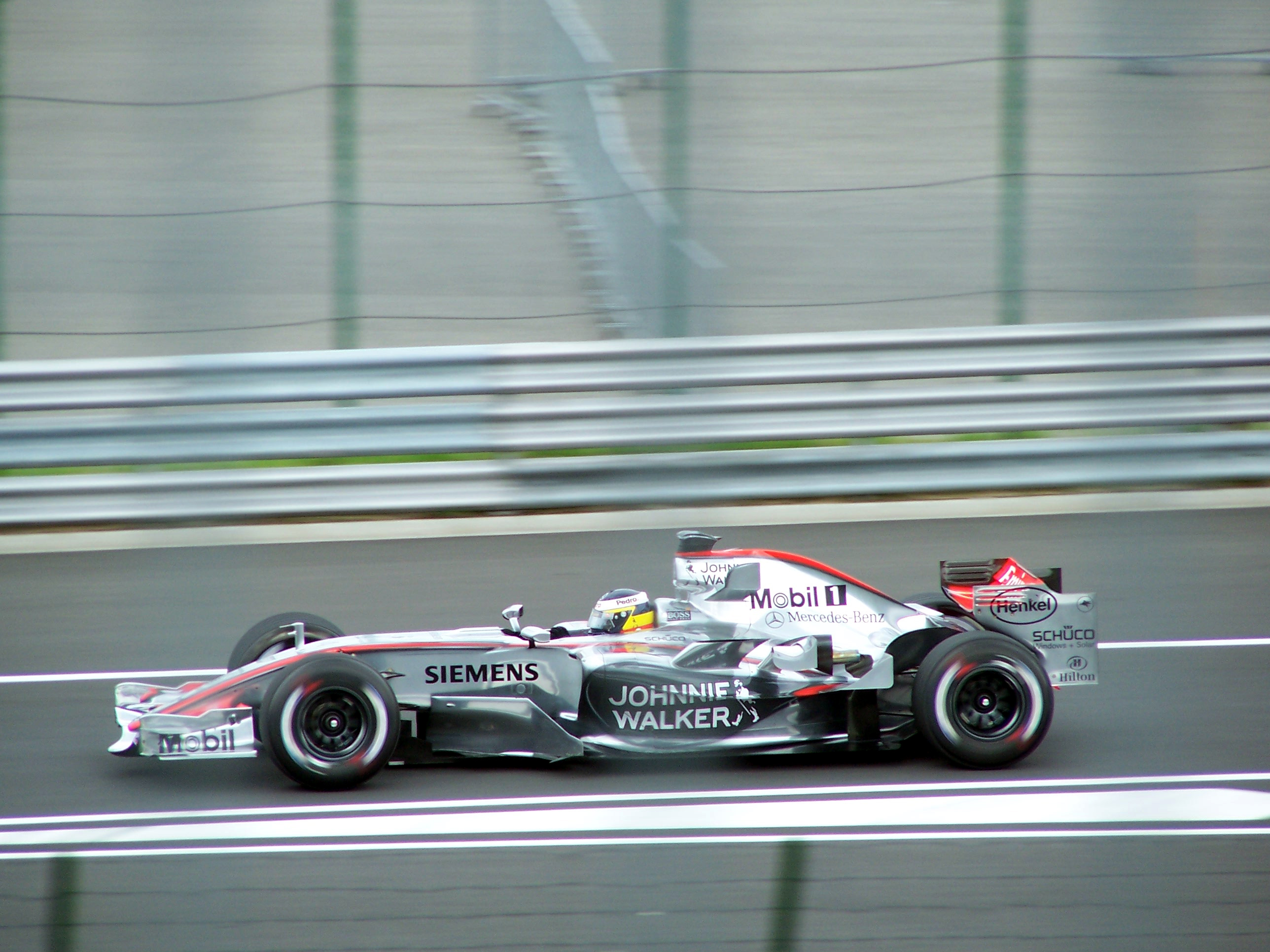
Pedro de la Rosa scored the only podium finish of his career in second position.

Button won the race despite beginning in 14th place through relentless driving with de la Rosa scoring his only career's podium with second place, and Heidfeld getting BMW Sauber's first podium with 3rd. Debutant driver Robert Kubica finished in seventh place and would have scored two points, but was later disqualified as his car was found to be underweight due to excessive tyre wear. This coincidentally meant that Michael Schumacher earned a point despite not finishing, as he was elevated to 8th place in the final results.

=== Post-race ===
In a 2020 watch along of the race on Sky Sports F1 with Jenson Button, Anthony Davidson, Andrew Shovlin and then BBC Radio 5 Live Formula One commentator David Croft said "In the BBC 5 live commentary box in my first season in Formula One after starting the day doing a piece on our breakfast show where they said has Jenson Button got any chance of winning and I said no, no chance what so ever. At this stage (15 laps to go) I'm getting irked because they keep asking me to get a score flash for the football or the rugby or the cricket as used to do on 5 Live and I'm like no we got to stick with this Jenson Button can win this race and they finally came over into the talkback, my producer saying no more interruptions Crofty, take it to the chequered flag, bring him home."

== Classification ==
=== Qualifying ===
Pos.	No.	Driver	Constructor	Q1	Q2	Q3	Grid
1	3	(Finland) Kimi Räikkönen	McLaren-Mercedes	1:20.080	1:19.704	1:19.599	1
2	6	(Brazil) Felipe Massa	Ferrari	1:19.742	1:19.504	1:19.886	2
3	11	(Brazil) Rubens Barrichello	Honda	1:21.141	1:19.783	1:20.085	3
4	12	(United Kingdom) Jenson Button	Honda	1:20.820	1:19.943	1:20.092	14^{1}
5	4	(Spain) Pedro de la Rosa	McLaren-Mercedes	1:21.288	1:19.991	1:20.117	4
6	9	(Australia) Mark Webber	Williams-Cosworth	1:21.335	1:20.047	1:20.266	5
7	7	(Germany) Ralf Schumacher	Toyota	1:21.112	1:20.243	1:20.759	6
8	2	(Italy) Giancarlo Fisichella	Renault	1:21.370	1:20.154	1:20.924	7
9	8	(Italy) Jarno Trulli	Toyota	1:21.434	1:20.231	1:21.132	8
10	17	(Poland) Robert Kubica	BMW Sauber	1:20.891	1:20.256	1:22.049	9
11	16	(Germany) Nick Heidfeld	BMW Sauber	1:21.437	1:20.623		10
12	5	(Germany) Michael Schumacher	Ferrari	1:21.440^{3}	1:20.875^{3}		11
13	14	(United Kingdom) David Coulthard	Red Bull-Ferrari	1:21.163	1:20.890		12
14	15	(Austria) Christian Klien	Red Bull-Ferrari	1:22.027	1:21.207		13
15	1	(Spain) Fernando Alonso	Renault	1:21.792^{3}	1:21.364^{3}		15
16	18	(Portugal) Tiago Monteiro	MF1-Toyota	1:22.009	1:23.767		16
17	20	(Italy) Vitantonio Liuzzi	Toro Rosso-Cosworth	1:22.068			17
18	10	(Germany) Nico Rosberg	Williams-Cosworth	1:22.084			18
19	21	(United States) Scott Speed	Toro Rosso-Cosworth	1:22.317			20^{2}
20	22	(Japan) Takuma Sato	Super Aguri-Honda	1:22.967			19
21	19	(Netherlands) Christijan Albers	MF1-Toyota	1:23.146			22^{1}
22	23	(Japan) Sakon Yamamoto	Super Aguri-Honda	1:24.016			21

Notes

- ^1 – Jenson Button and Christijan Albers both received a ten-place grid penalty because of earlier engine changes.
- ^2 – The Grand Prix stewards declared that Scott Speed had impeded another driver during the qualifying session, and penalised him by deleting his three fastest qualifying times. His qualifying time became 1:23.005 instead of 1:22.317, setting him one position back on the grid.
- ^3 – Fernando Alonso and Michael Schumacher both had two seconds added to their lap times for each part of qualifying; the times shown here include the two-second penalties.

=== Race ===
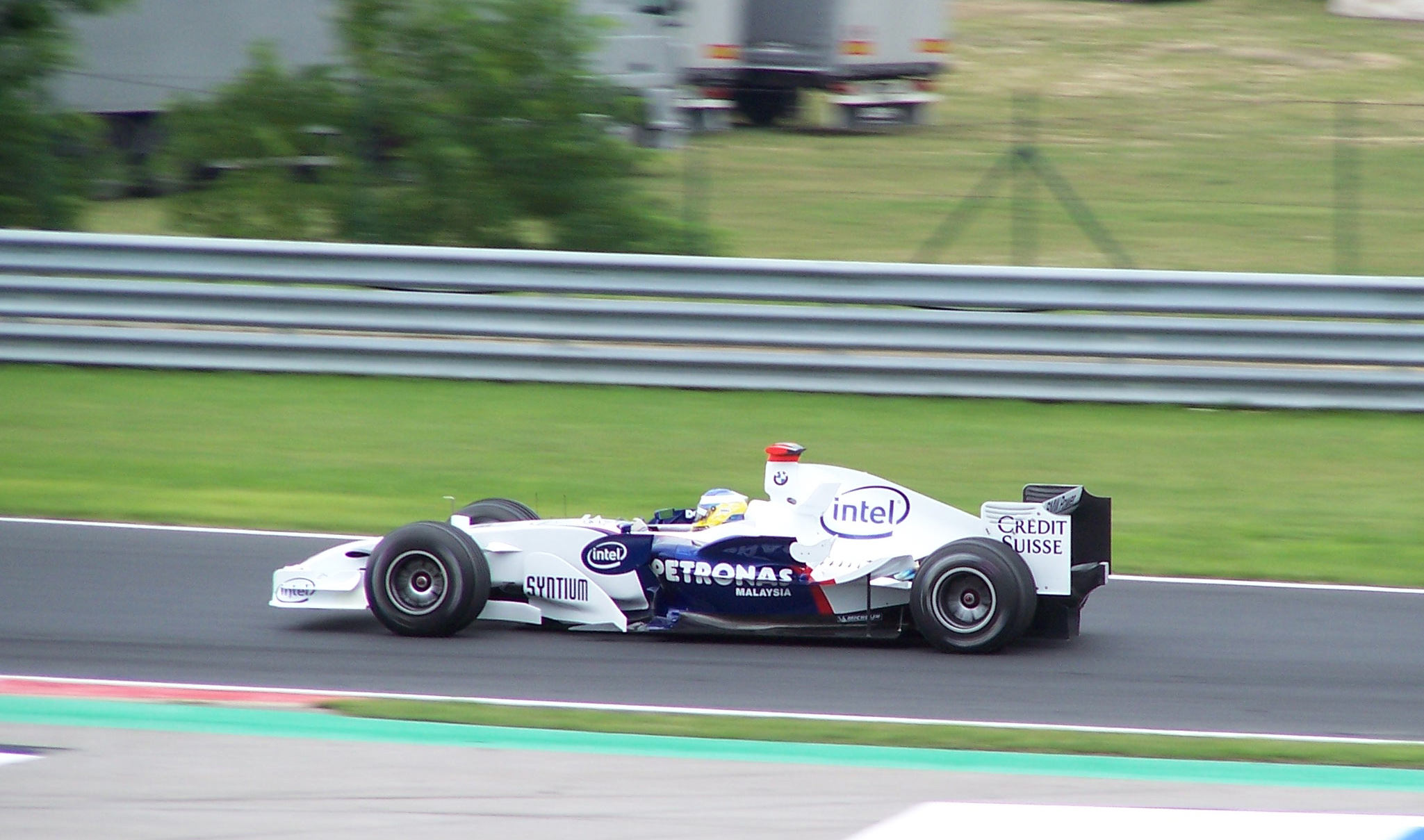
Nick Heidfeld scored the BMW Sauber team's first podium finish in third position.

Pos.	No.	Driver	Constructor	Tyre	Laps	Time/Retired	Grid	Points
1	12	(United Kingdom) Jenson Button	Honda	M	70	1:52:20.941	14	10
2	4	(Spain) Pedro de la Rosa	McLaren-Mercedes	M	70	+30.837	4	8
3	16	(Germany) Nick Heidfeld	BMW Sauber	M	70	+43.822	10	6
4	11	(Brazil) Rubens Barrichello	Honda	M	70	+45.205	3	5
5	14	(United Kingdom) David Coulthard	Red Bull-Ferrari	M	69	+1 lap	12	4
6	7	(Germany) Ralf Schumacher	Toyota	B	69	+1 lap	6	3
7	6	(Brazil) Felipe Massa	Ferrari	B	69	+1 lap	2	2
8	5	(Germany) Michael Schumacher	Ferrari	B	67	Collision damage	11	1
9	18	(Portugal) Tiago Monteiro	MF1-Toyota	B	67	+3 laps	16	
10	19	(Netherlands) Christijan Albers	MF1-Toyota	B	67	+3 laps	22	
11	21	(United States) Scott Speed	Toro Rosso-Cosworth	M	66	+4 laps	20	
12	8	(Italy) Jarno Trulli	Toyota	B	65	Engine	8	
13	22	(Japan) Takuma Sato	Super Aguri-Honda	B	65	+5 laps	19	
Ret	1	(Spain) Fernando Alonso	Renault	M	51	Wheel nut/driveshaft	15	
Ret	3	(Finland) Kimi Räikkönen	McLaren-Mercedes	M	25	Collision	1	
Ret	20	(Italy) Vitantonio Liuzzi	Toro Rosso-Cosworth	M	25	Collision damage	17	
Ret	10	(Germany) Nico Rosberg	Williams-Cosworth	B	19	Electrical/Accident	18	
Ret	2	(Italy) Giancarlo Fisichella	Renault	M	18	Accident damage	7	
Ret	15	(Austria) Christian Klien	Red Bull-Ferrari	M	6	Spun off	13	
Ret	9	(Australia) Mark Webber	Williams-Cosworth	B	1	Spun off	5	
Ret	23	(Japan) Sakon Yamamoto	Super Aguri-Honda	B	0	Engine	21	
DSQ	17	(Poland) Robert Kubica	BMW Sauber	M	69	Underweight (+1 lap)^{4}	9	

Notes

- ^4 – Robert Kubica originally finished seventh, but was disqualified after the race, as his car was 2 kg underweight at the end of the race due to excessive tyre wear.

== Championship standings after the race ==
Drivers' Championship standings

Pos.	Driver	Points
1	(Spain) Fernando Alonso*	100
2	(Germany) Michael Schumacher*	90
3	(Brazil) Felipe Massa*	52
4	(Italy) Giancarlo Fisichella	49
5	(Finland) Kimi Räikkönen	49

Constructors' Championship standings

	Pos.	Constructor	Points
	1	(France) Renault*	149
	2	(Italy) Ferrari*	142
	3	(United Kingdom) McLaren-Mercedes*	85
	4	(Japan) Honda	52
1	5	(Germany) BMW Sauber	26

- Note: Only the top five positions are included for both sets of standings.
- Bold text and an asterisk indicates competitors who still had a theoretical chance of becoming World Champion.

== Awards ==
ITV's coverage of this race won a BAFTA in 2006, in the category "Best Sport". The awards took place May 20, 2007.

== See also ==
- 2006 Hungaroring GP2 Series round

Previous race: 2006 German Grand Prix	FIA Formula One World Championship; 2006 season	Next race: 2006 Turkish Grand Prix
Previous race: 2005 Hungarian Grand Prix	Hungarian Grand Prix	Next race: 2007 Hungarian Grand Prix
