= List of career achievements by Lewis Hamilton =

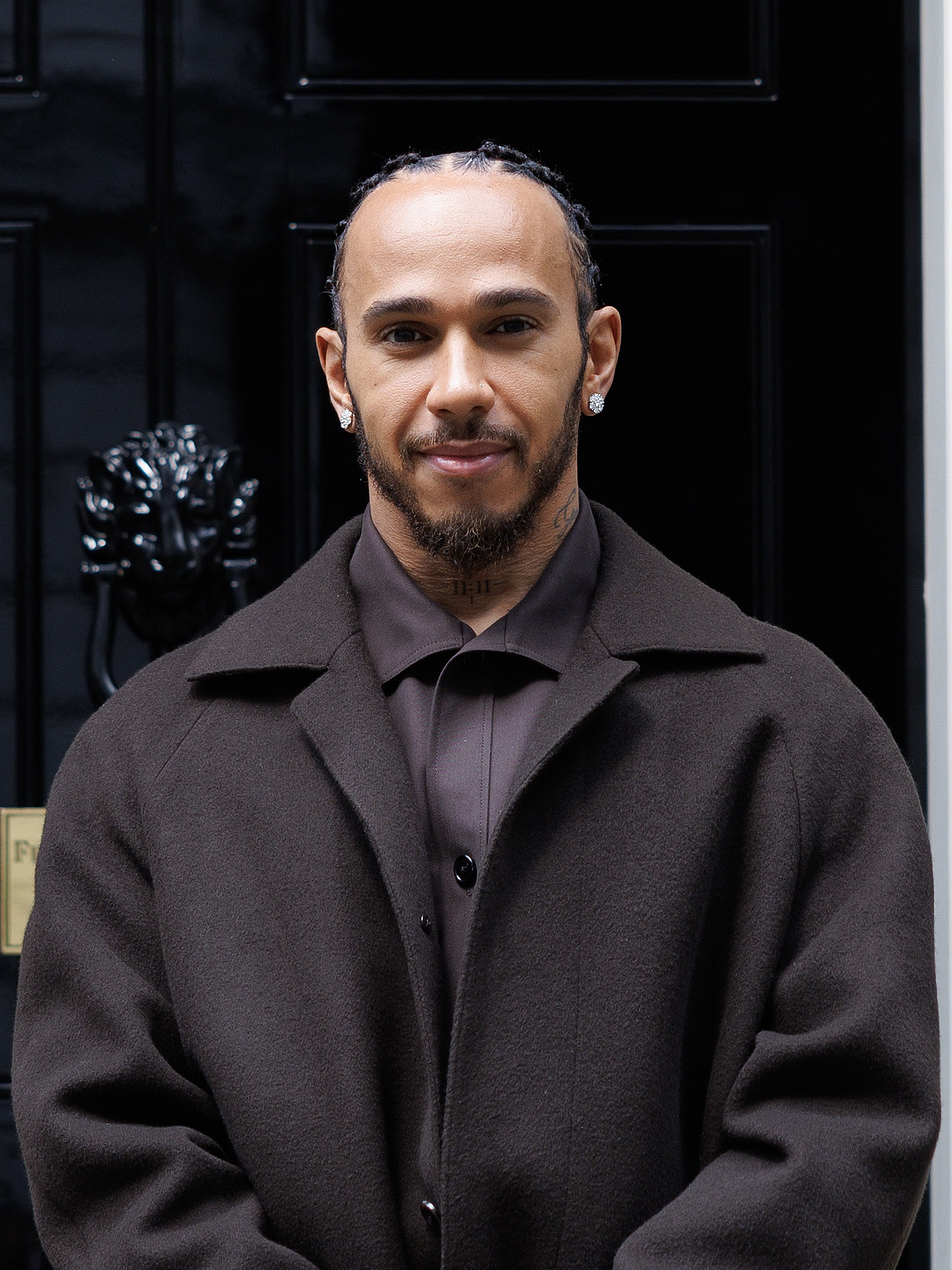
Hamilton in 2025

Lewis Hamilton is a British racing driver. Throughout his career in the grassroots categories, he won the Formula Renault 2.0 UK Championship (2003), Bahrain Superprix (2004), Formula 3 Euro Series Championship (2005), the Masters of Formula 3 Race (2005) and GP2 Series Championship (2006). In his Formula One career, Hamilton has won seven world titles, a record shared with German driver Michael Schumacher.

== Formula One ==
As of the 2026 São Paulo Grand Prix

=== World titles ===
No.	Season	Team	Wins	Podiums	Pole positions	Retirements	Points	Ref.
1	2008	McLaren	5	10	7	1	98	
2	2014	Mercedes	11	16	7	3	384	
3	2015	Mercedes	10	17	11	1	381	
4	2017	Mercedes	9	13	11	0	363	
5	2018	Mercedes	11	17	11	1	408	
6	2019	Mercedes	11	17	5	0	413	
7	2020	Mercedes	11	14	10	0	347	

=== Wins ===
Key:

- No. – Victory number; for example, "1" signifies Hamilton's first race win.
- Race – Race number in Hamilton's Formula One career; for example "15" signifies Hamilton's 15th Formula One race.
- Grid – The position on the grid from which Hamilton started the race
- Margin – Margin of victory, given in the format of minutes:seconds.milliseconds
- † – Driver's Championship winning season.

Grand Prix victories
No.	Race	Date	Season	Grand Prix	Circuit	Grid	Margin	Team	Engine	Chassis	Ref
1	6	10 June 2007	2007	Canadian	Circuit Gilles Villeneuve	1	0:04.343	McLaren	Mercedes	MP4-22	
2	7	17 June 2007	2007	United States	Indianapolis Motor Speedway	1	0:01.518	McLaren	Mercedes	MP4-22	
3	11	5 August 2007	2007	Hungarian	Hungaroring	1	0:00.715	McLaren	Mercedes	MP4-22	
4	15	30 September 2007	2007	Japanese	Fuji Speedway	1	0:08.377	McLaren	Mercedes	MP4-22	
5	18	16 March 2008	2008^{†}	Australian	Albert Park Circuit	1	0:05.478	McLaren	Mercedes	MP4-23	
6	23	25 May 2008	2008^{†}	Monaco	Circuit de Monaco	3	0:03.064	McLaren	Mercedes	MP4-23	
7	26	6 July 2008	2008^{†}	British	Silverstone Circuit	4	1:08.577	McLaren	Mercedes	MP4-23	
8	27	20 July 2008	2008^{†}	German	Hockenheimring	1	0:05.586	McLaren	Mercedes	MP4-23	
9	34	19 October 2008	2008^{†}	Chinese	Shanghai International Circuit	1	0:14.925	McLaren	Mercedes	MP4-23	
10	45	26 July 2009	2009	Hungarian	Hungaroring	4	0:11.529	McLaren	Mercedes	MP4-24	
11	49	27 September 2009	2009	Singapore	Marina Bay Street Circuit	1	0:09.634	McLaren	Mercedes	MP4-24	
12	59	30 May 2010	2010	Turkish	Istanbul Park	2	0:02.645	McLaren	Mercedes	MP4-25	
13	60	13 June 2010	2010	Canadian	Circuit Gilles Villeneuve	1	0:02.254	McLaren	Mercedes	MP4-25	
14	65	29 August 2010	2010	Belgian	Circuit de Spa-Francorchamps	2	0:01.571	McLaren	Mercedes	MP4-25	
15	74	17 April 2011	2011	Chinese	Shanghai International Circuit	3	0:05.198	McLaren	Mercedes	MP4-26	
16	81	24 July 2011	2011	German	Nürburgring	2	0:03.980	McLaren	Mercedes	MP4-26	
17	89	13 November 2011	2011	Abu Dhabi	Yas Marina Circuit	2	0:08.457	McLaren	Mercedes	MP4-26	
18	97	10 June 2012	2012	Canadian	Circuit Gilles Villeneuve	2	0:02.513	McLaren	Mercedes	MP4-27	
19	101	29 July 2012	2012	Hungarian	Hungaroring	1	0:01.032	McLaren	Mercedes	MP4-27	
20	103	9 September 2012	2012	Italian	Autodromo Nazionale di Monza	1	0:04.356	McLaren	Mercedes	MP4-27	
21	109	18 November 2012	2012	United States	Circuit of the Americas	2	0:00.675	McLaren	Mercedes	MP4-27	
22	120	28 July 2013	2013	Hungarian	Hungaroring	1	0:10.938	Mercedes	Mercedes	F1 W04	
23	131	30 March 2014	2014^{†}	Malaysian	Sepang International Circuit	1	0:17.313	Mercedes	Mercedes	F1 W05 Hybrid	
24	132	6 April 2014	2014^{†}	Bahrain	Bahrain International Circuit	2	0:01.085	Mercedes	Mercedes	F1 W05 Hybrid	
25	133	20 April 2014	2014^{†}	Chinese	Shanghai International Circuit	1	0:18.062	Mercedes	Mercedes	F1 W05 Hybrid	
26	134	11 May 2014	2014^{†}	Spanish	Circuit de Barcelona-Catalunya	1	0:00.636	Mercedes	Mercedes	F1 W05 Hybrid	
27	138	6 July 2014	2014^{†}	British	Silverstone Circuit	6	0:30.135	Mercedes	Mercedes	F1 W05 Hybrid	
28	142	7 September 2014	2014^{†}	Italian	Autodromo Nazionale di Monza	1	0:03.175	Mercedes	Mercedes	F1 W05 Hybrid	
29	143	21 September 2014	2014^{†}	Singapore	Marina Bay Street Circuit	1	0:13.534	Mercedes	Mercedes	F1 W05 Hybrid	
30	144	5 October 2014	2014^{†}	Japanese	Suzuka International Racing Course	2	0:09.180	Mercedes	Mercedes	F1 W05 Hybrid	
31	145	12 October 2014	2014^{†}	Russian	Sochi Autodrom	1	0:13.657	Mercedes	Mercedes	F1 W05 Hybrid	
32	146	2 November 2014	2014^{†}	United States	Circuit of the Americas	2	0:04.314	Mercedes	Mercedes	F1 W05 Hybrid	
33	148	23 November 2014	2014^{†}	Abu Dhabi	Yas Marina Circuit	2	0:02.576	Mercedes	Mercedes	F1 W05 Hybrid	
34	149	15 March 2015	2015^{†}	Australian	Albert Park Circuit	1	0:01.360	Mercedes	Mercedes	F1 W06 Hybrid	
35	151	12 April 2015	2015^{†}	Chinese	Shanghai International Circuit	1	0:00.714	Mercedes	Mercedes	F1 W06 Hybrid	
36	152	19 April 2015	2015^{†}	Bahrain	Bahrain International Circuit	1	0:03.380	Mercedes	Mercedes	F1 W06 Hybrid	
37	155	7 June 2015	2015^{†}	Canadian	Circuit Gilles Villeneuve	1	0:02.285	Mercedes	Mercedes	F1 W06 Hybrid	
38	157	5 July 2015	2015^{†}	British	Silverstone Circuit	1	0:10.956	Mercedes	Mercedes	F1 W06 Hybrid	
39	159	23 August 2015	2015^{†}	Belgian	Circuit de Spa-Francorchamps	1	0:02.058	Mercedes	Mercedes	F1 W06 Hybrid	
40	160	6 September 2015	2015^{†}	Italian	Autodromo Nazionale di Monza	1	0:25.042	Mercedes	Mercedes	F1 W06 Hybrid	
41	162	27 September 2015	2015^{†}	Japanese	Suzuka International Racing Course	2	0:18.964	Mercedes	Mercedes	F1 W06 Hybrid	
42	163	11 October 2015	2015^{†}	Russian	Sochi Autodrom	2	0:05.953	Mercedes	Mercedes	F1 W06 Hybrid	
43	164	25 October 2015	2015^{†}	United States	Circuit of the Americas	2	0:02.850	Mercedes	Mercedes	F1 W06 Hybrid	
44	173	29 May 2016	2016	Monaco	Circuit de Monaco	3	0:07.252	Mercedes	Mercedes	F1 W07 Hybrid	
45	174	12 June 2016	2016	Canadian	Circuit Gilles Villeneuve	1	0:05.011	Mercedes	Mercedes	F1 W07 Hybrid	
46	176	3 July 2016	2016	Austrian	Red Bull Ring	1	0:05.719	Mercedes	Mercedes	F1 W07 Hybrid	
47	177	10 July 2016	2016	British	Silverstone Circuit	1	0:08.250	Mercedes	Mercedes	F1 W07 Hybrid	
48	178	24 July 2016	2016	Hungarian	Hungaroring	2	0:01.977	Mercedes	Mercedes	F1 W07 Hybrid	
49	179	31 July 2016	2016	German	Hockenheimring	2	0:06.996	Mercedes	Mercedes	F1 W07 Hybrid	
50	185	23 October 2016	2016	United States	Circuit of the Americas	1	0:04.520	Mercedes	Mercedes	F1 W07 Hybrid	
51	186	30 October 2016	2016	Mexican	Autódromo Hermanos Rodríguez	1	0:08.354	Mercedes	Mercedes	F1 W07 Hybrid	
52	187	13 November 2016	2016	Brazilian	Autódromo José Carlos Pace	1	0:11.455	Mercedes	Mercedes	F1 W07 Hybrid	
53	188	27 November 2016	2016	Abu Dhabi	Yas Marina Circuit	1	0:00.439	Mercedes	Mercedes	F1 W07 Hybrid	
54	190	9 April 2017	2017^{†}	Chinese	Shanghai International Circuit	1	0:06.250	Mercedes	Mercedes	F1 W08 EQ Power+	
55	193	14 May 2017	2017^{†}	Spanish	Circuit de Barcelona-Catalunya	1	0:03.490	Mercedes	Mercedes	F1 W08 EQ Power+	
56	195	11 June 2017	2017^{†}	Canadian	Circuit Gilles Villeneuve	1	0:19.783	Mercedes	Mercedes	F1 W08 EQ Power+	
57	198	16 July 2017	2017^{†}	British	Silverstone Circuit	1	0:14.063	Mercedes	Mercedes	F1 W08 EQ Power+	
58	200	27 August 2017	2017^{†}	Belgian	Circuit de Spa-Francorchamps	1	0:02.358	Mercedes	Mercedes	F1 W08 EQ Power+	
59	201	3 September 2017	2017^{†}	Italian	Autodromo Nazionale di Monza	1	0:04.471	Mercedes	Mercedes	F1 W08 EQ Power+	
60	202	17 September 2017	2017^{†}	Singapore	Marina Bay Street Circuit	5	0:04.507	Mercedes	Mercedes	F1 W08 EQ Power+	
61	204	8 October 2017	2017^{†}	Japanese	Suzuka International Racing Course	1	0:01.211	Mercedes	Mercedes	F1 W08 EQ Power+	
62	205	22 October 2017	2017^{†}	United States	Circuit of the Americas	1	0:10.143	Mercedes	Mercedes	F1 W08 EQ Power+	
63	212	29 April 2018	2018^{†}	Azerbaijan	Baku City Circuit	2	0:02.460	Mercedes	Mercedes	F1 W09 EQ Power+	
64	213	13 May 2018	2018^{†}	Spanish	Circuit de Barcelona-Catalunya	1	0:20.593	Mercedes	Mercedes	F1 W09 EQ Power+	
65	216	24 June 2018	2018^{†}	French	Circuit Paul Ricard	1	0:07.090	Mercedes	Mercedes	F1 W09 EQ Power+	
66	219	22 July 2018	2018^{†}	German	Hockenheimring	14	0:04.535	Mercedes	Mercedes	F1 W09 EQ Power+	
67	220	29 July 2018	2018^{†}	Hungarian	Hungaroring	1	0:17.123	Mercedes	Mercedes	F1 W09 EQ Power+	
68	222	2 September 2018	2018^{†}	Italian	Autodromo Nazionale di Monza	3	0:08.705	Mercedes	Mercedes	F1 W09 EQ Power+	
69	223	16 September 2018	2018^{†}	Singapore	Marina Bay Street Circuit	1	0:08.961	Mercedes	Mercedes	F1 W09 EQ Power+	
70	224	30 September 2018	2018^{†}	Russian	Sochi Autodrom	2	0:02.545	Mercedes	Mercedes	F1 W09 EQ Power+	
71	225	7 October 2018	2018^{†}	Japanese	Suzuka International Racing Course	1	0:12.919	Mercedes	Mercedes	F1 W09 EQ Power+	
72	228	11 November 2018	2018^{†}	Brazilian	Autódromo José Carlos Pace	1	0:01.469	Mercedes	Mercedes	F1 W09 EQ Power+	
73	229	25 November 2018	2018^{†}	Abu Dhabi	Yas Marina Circuit	1	0:02.581	Mercedes	Mercedes	F1 W09 EQ Power+	
74	231	31 March 2019	2019^{†}	Bahrain	Bahrain International Circuit	3	0:02.980	Mercedes	Mercedes	F1 W10 EQ Power+	
75	232	14 April 2019	2019^{†}	Chinese	Shanghai International Circuit	2	0:06.552	Mercedes	Mercedes	F1 W10 EQ Power+	
76	234	12 May 2019	2019^{†}	Spanish	Circuit de Barcelona-Catalunya	2	0:04.074	Mercedes	Mercedes	F1 W10 EQ Power+	
77	235	26 May 2019	2019^{†}	Monaco	Circuit de Monaco	1	0:02.602	Mercedes	Mercedes	F1 W10 EQ Power+	
78	236	9 June 2019	2019^{†}	Canadian	Circuit Gilles Villeneuve	2	0:03.658	Mercedes	Mercedes	F1 W10 EQ Power+	
79	237	23 June 2019	2019^{†}	French	Circuit Paul Ricard	1	0:18.056	Mercedes	Mercedes	F1 W10 EQ Power+	
80	239	14 July 2019	2019^{†}	British	Silverstone Circuit	2	0:24.928	Mercedes	Mercedes	F1 W10 EQ Power+	
81	241	4 August 2019	2019^{†}	Hungarian	Hungaroring	3	0:17.796	Mercedes	Mercedes	F1 W10 EQ Power+	
82	245	29 September 2019	2019^{†}	Russian	Sochi Autodrom	2	0:03.829	Mercedes	Mercedes	F1 W10 EQ Power+	
83	247	27 October 2019	2019^{†}	Mexican	Autódromo Hermanos Rodríguez	3	0:01.766	Mercedes	Mercedes	F1 W10 EQ Power+	
84	250	1 December 2019	2019^{†}	Abu Dhabi	Yas Marina Circuit	1	0:16.772	Mercedes	Mercedes	F1 W10 EQ Power+	
85	252	12 July 2020	2020^{†}	Styrian	Red Bull Ring	1	0:13.719	Mercedes	Mercedes	F1 W11 EQ Performance	
86	253	19 July 2020	2020^{†}	Hungarian	Hungaroring	1	0:08.702	Mercedes	Mercedes	F1 W11 EQ Performance	
87	254	2 August 2020	2020^{†}	British	Silverstone Circuit	1	0:05.856	Mercedes	Mercedes	F1 W11 EQ Performance	
88	256	16 August 2020	2020^{†}	Spanish	Circuit de Barcelona-Catalunya	1	0:24.177	Mercedes	Mercedes	F1 W11 EQ Performance	
89	257	30 August 2020	2020^{†}	Belgian	Circuit de Spa-Francorchamps	1	0:08.448	Mercedes	Mercedes	F1 W11 EQ Performance	
90	259	13 September 2020	2020^{†}	Tuscan	Mugello Circuit	1	0:04.880	Mercedes	Mercedes	F1 W11 EQ Performance	
91	261	11 October 2020	2020^{†}	Eifel	Nürburgring	2	0:04.470	Mercedes	Mercedes	F1 W11 EQ Performance	
92	262	25 October 2020	2020^{†}	Portuguese	Algarve International Circuit	1	0:25.592	Mercedes	Mercedes	F1 W11 EQ Performance	
93	263	1 November 2020	2020^{†}	Emilia Romagna	Autodromo Internazionale Enzo e Dino Ferrari	2	0:05.783	Mercedes	Mercedes	F1 W11 EQ Performance	
94	264	15 November 2020	2020^{†}	Turkish	Istanbul Park	6	0:31.633	Mercedes	Mercedes	F1 W11 EQ Performance	
95	265	29 November 2020	2020^{†}	Bahrain	Bahrain International Circuit	1	0:01.254	Mercedes	Mercedes	F1 W11 EQ Performance	
96	267	28 March 2021	2021	Bahrain	Bahrain International Circuit	2	0:00.745	Mercedes	Mercedes	F1 W12 E Performance	
97	269	2 May 2021	2021	Portuguese	Algarve International Circuit	2	0:29.148	Mercedes	Mercedes	F1 W12 E Performance	
98	270	9 May 2021	2021	Spanish	Circuit de Barcelona-Catalunya	1	0:15.841	Mercedes	Mercedes	F1 W12 E Performance	
99	276	18 July 2021	2021	British	Silverstone Circuit	2	0:03.871	Mercedes	Mercedes	F1 W12 E Performance	
100	281	26 September 2021	2021	Russian	Sochi Autodrom	4	0:53.271	Mercedes	Mercedes	F1 W12 E Performance	
101	285	14 November 2021	2021	São Paulo	Autódromo José Carlos Pace	10	0:10.496	Mercedes	Mercedes	F1 W12 E Performance	
102	286	21 November 2021	2021	Qatar	Losail International Circuit	1	0:25.743	Mercedes	Mercedes	F1 W12 E Performance	
103	287	5 December 2021	2021	Saudi Arabian	Jeddah Corniche Circuit	1	0:21.825	Mercedes	Mercedes	F1 W12 E Performance	
104	344	7 July 2024	2024	British	Silverstone Circuit	2	0:01.465	Mercedes	Mercedes	F1 W15 E Performance	
105	346	28 July 2024	2024	Belgian	Circuit de Spa-Francorchamps	3	0:00.647	Mercedes	Mercedes	F1 W15 E Performance	
106	387	14 June 2026	2026	Barcelona-Catalunya	Circuit de Barcelona-Catalunya	2	0:19.561	Ferrari	Ferrari	SF-26	

=== Podiums ===
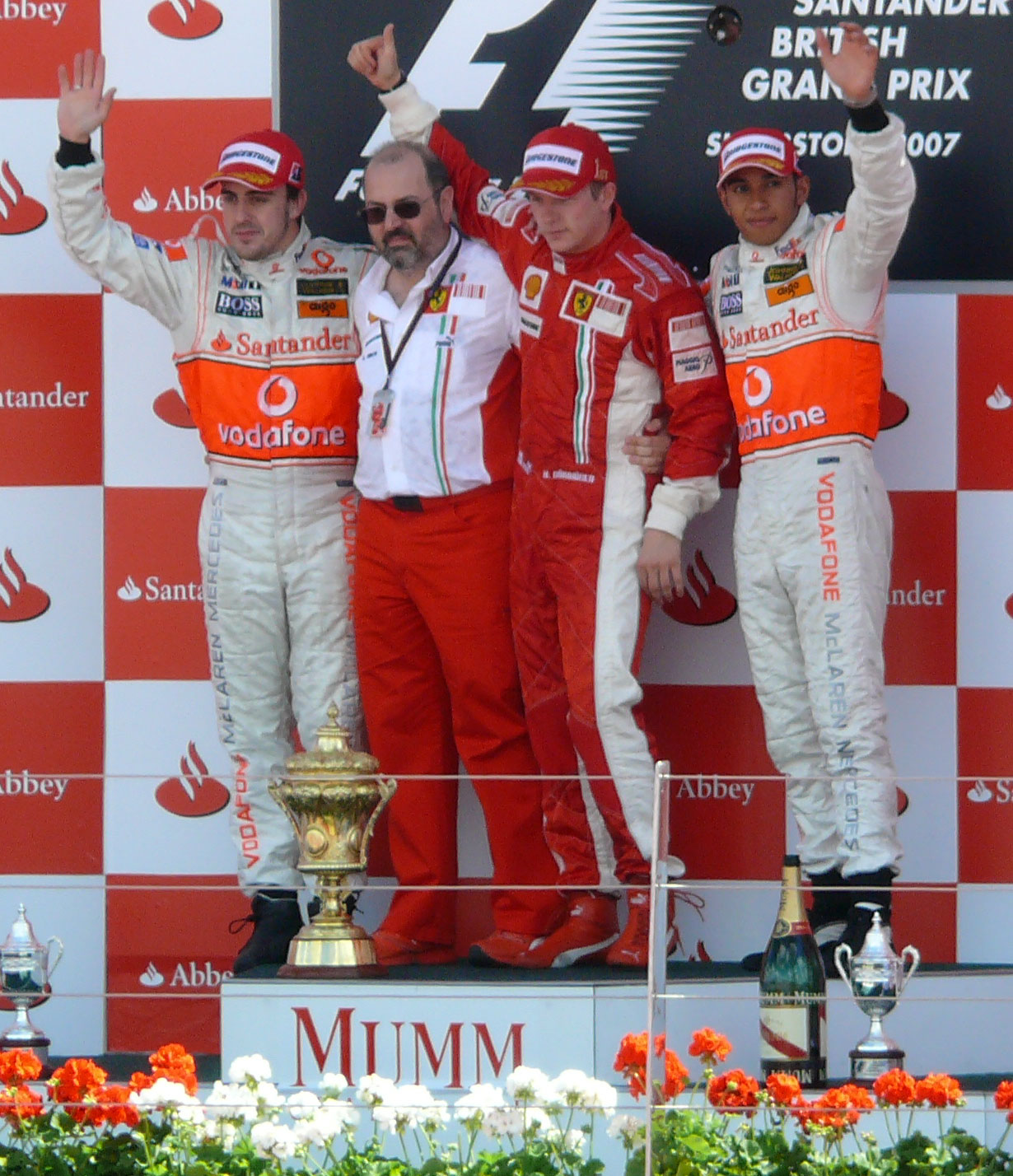
Hamilton finished 3rd in the 2007 British Grand Prix

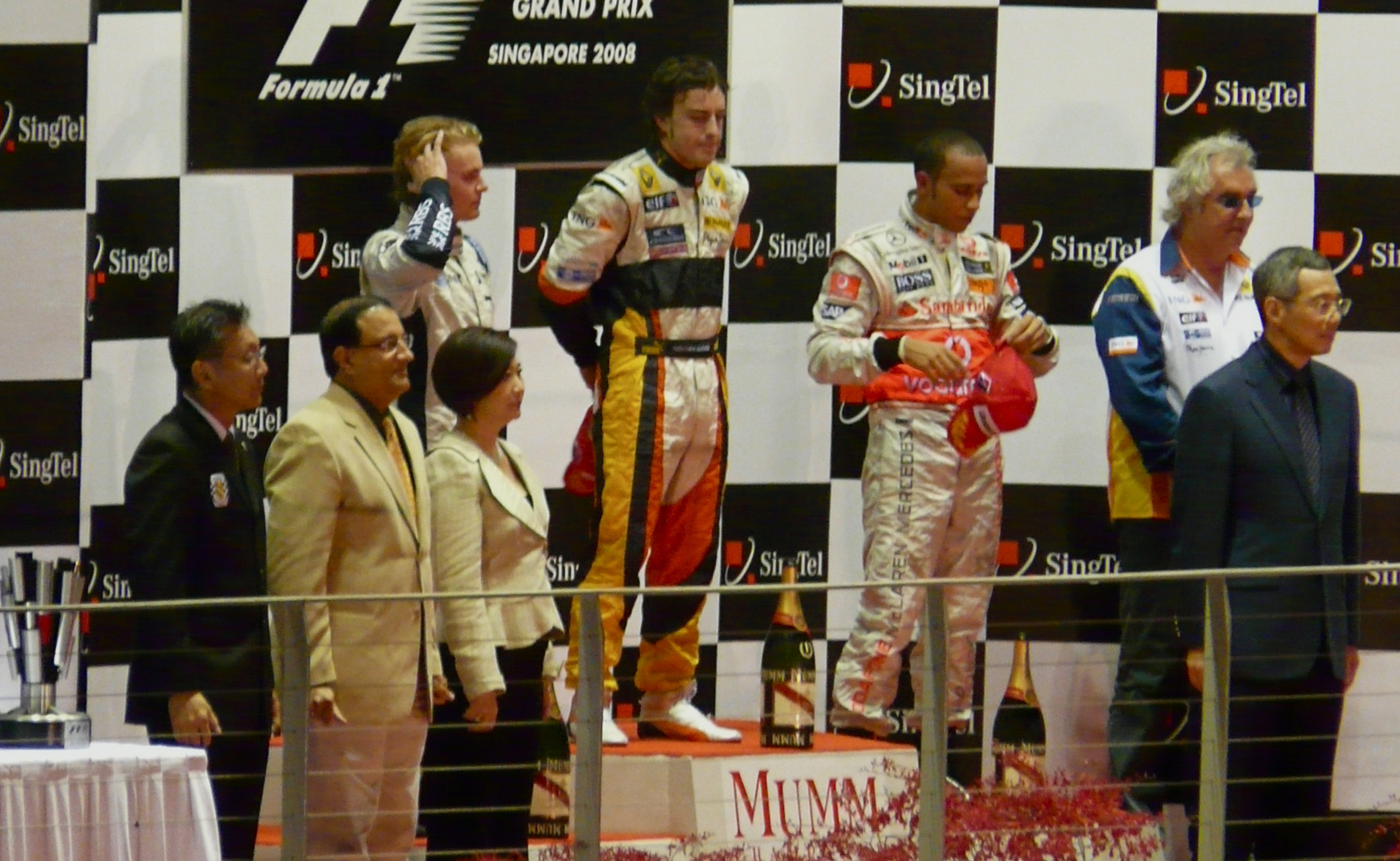
2008 Singapore Grand Prix podium

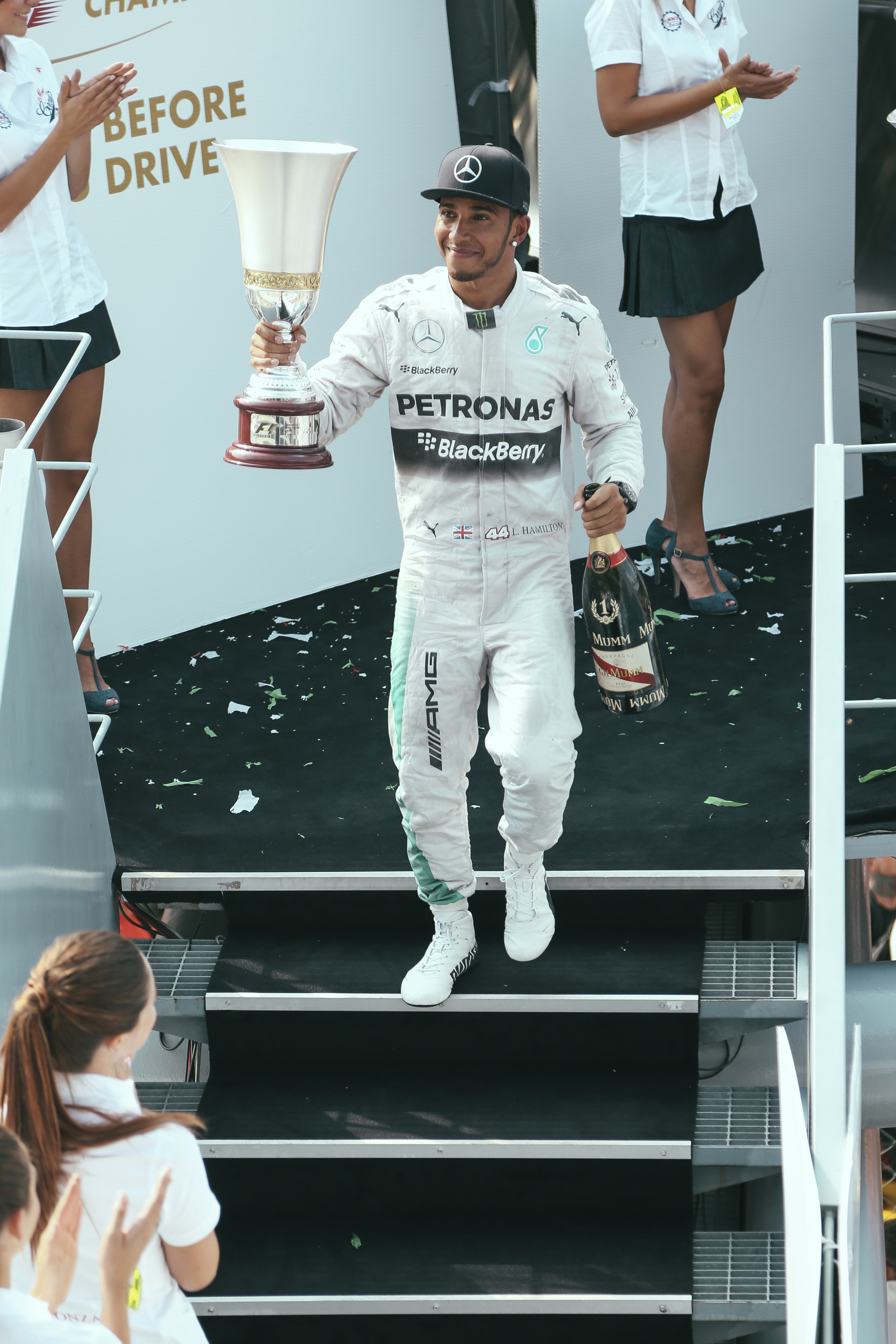
2014 Italian Grand Prix podium

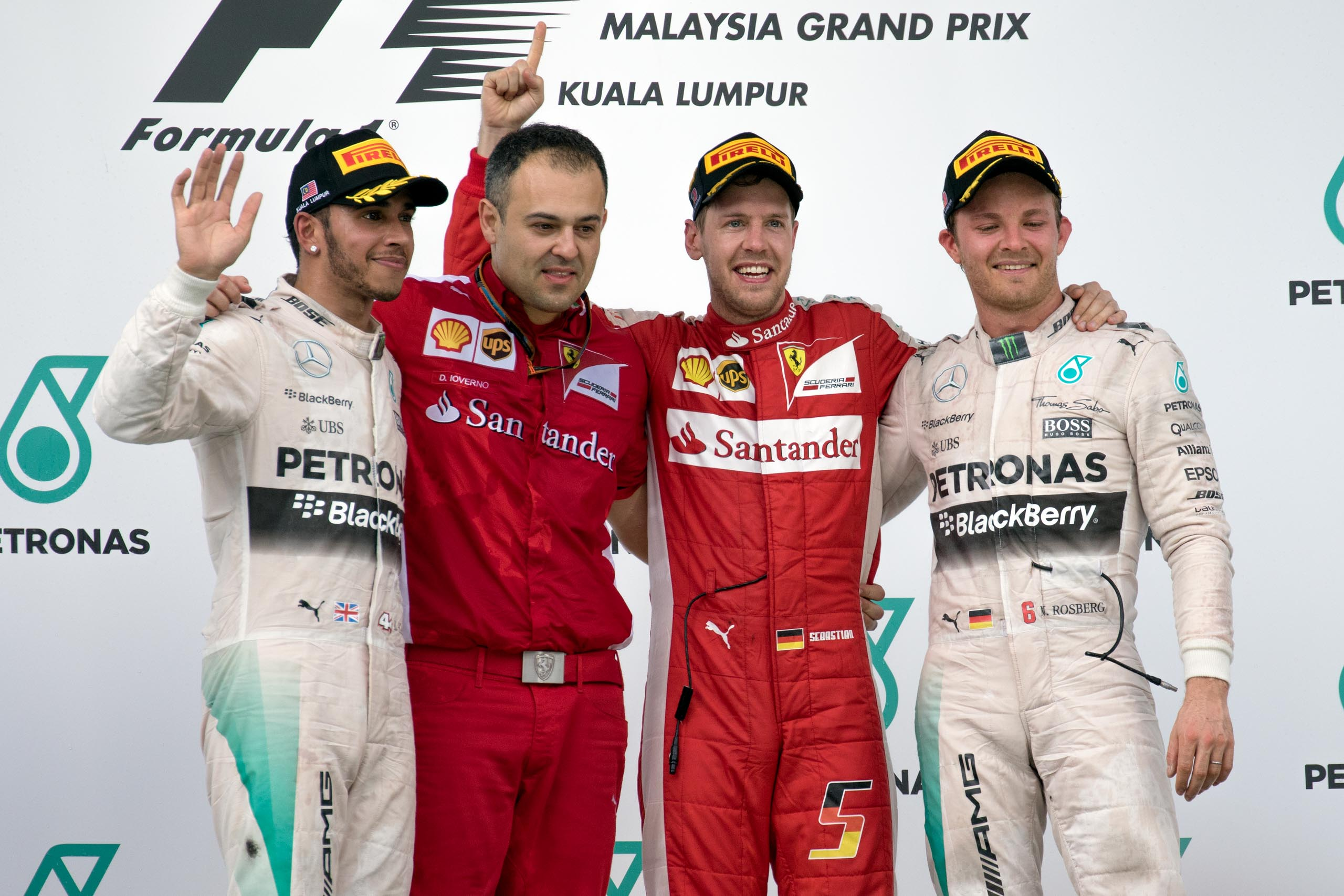
2nd place at the 2015 Malaysian Grand Prix.

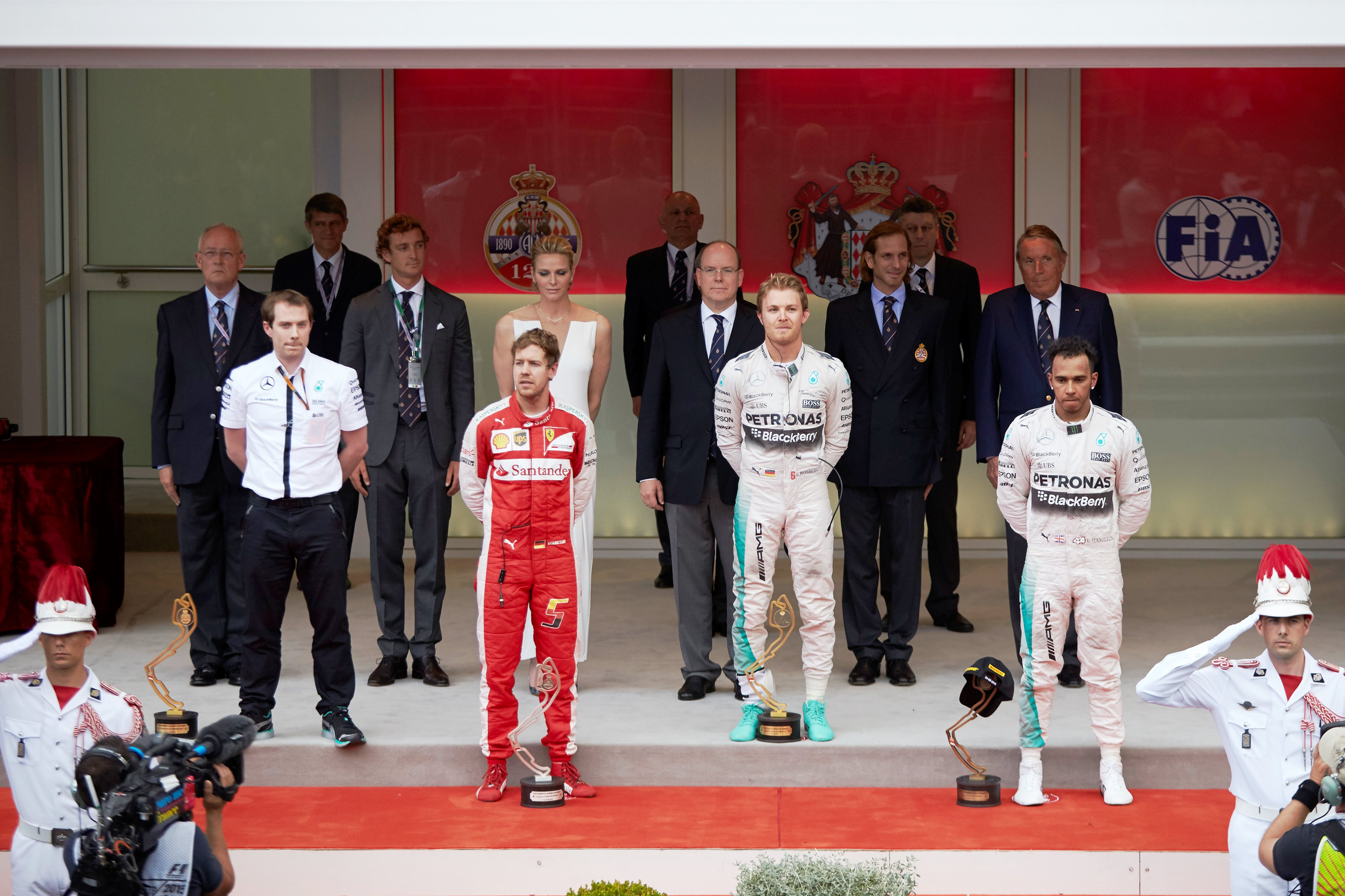
2015 Monaco Grand Prix podium

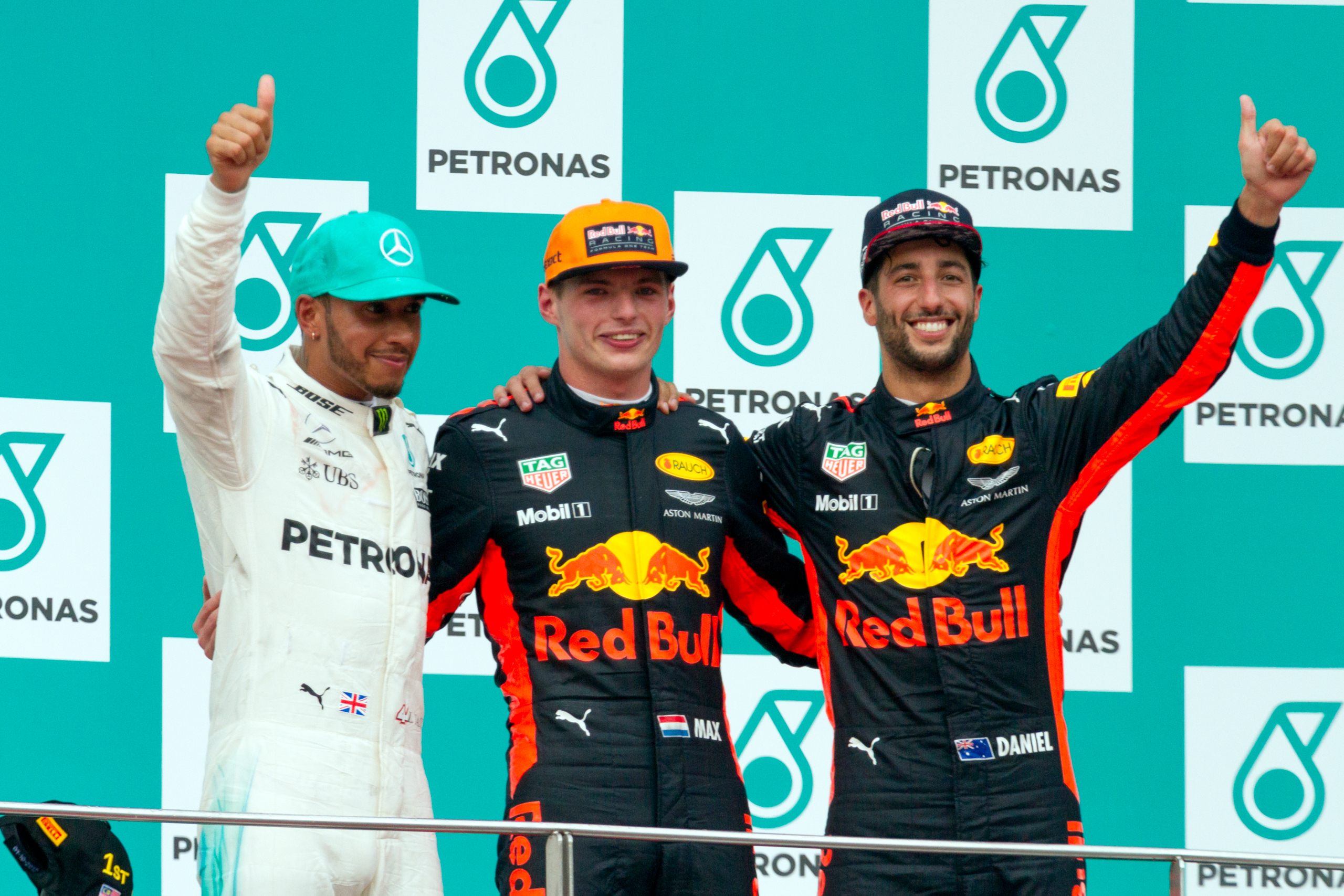
2017 Malaysian Grand Prix podium

No.	Season	Grand Prix	Circuit	Grid	Final	Constructor	Ref.
1	2007	Australian	Albert Park Circuit	4	3	McLaren-Mercedes	
2	2007	Malaysian	Sepang International Circuit	4	2	McLaren-Mercedes	
3	2007	Bahrain	Bahrain International Circuit	2	2	McLaren-Mercedes	
4	2007	Spanish	Circuit de Barcelona-Catalunya	4	2	McLaren-Mercedes	
5	2007	Monaco	Circuit de Monaco	2	2	McLaren-Mercedes	
6	2007	Canadian	Circuit Gilles Villeneuve	1	1	McLaren-Mercedes	
7	2007	United States	Indianapolis Motor Speedway	1	1	McLaren-Mercedes	
8	2007	French	Circuit de Nevers Magny-Cours	2	3	McLaren-Mercedes	
9	2007	British	Silverstone Circuit	1	3	McLaren-Mercedes	
10	2007	Hungarian	Hungaroring	1	1	McLaren-Mercedes	
11	2007	Italian	Autodromo Nazionale di Monza	2	2	McLaren-Mercedes	
12	2007	Japanese	Fuji Speedway	1	1	McLaren-Mercedes	
13	2008	Australian	Albert Park Circuit	1	1	McLaren-Mercedes	
14	2008	Spanish	Circuit de Barcelona-Catalunya	5	3	McLaren-Mercedes	
15	2008	Turkish	Istanbul Park	3	2	McLaren-Mercedes	
16	2008	Monaco	Circuit de Monaco	3	1	McLaren-Mercedes	
17	2008	British	Silverstone Circuit	4	1	McLaren-Mercedes	
18	2008	German	Hockenheimring	1	1	McLaren-Mercedes	
19	2008	European	Valencia Street Circuit	2	2	McLaren-Mercedes	
20	2008	Belgian	Circuit de Spa-Francorchamps	1	3	McLaren-Mercedes	
21	2008	Singapore	Marina Bay Street Circuit	2	3	McLaren-Mercedes	
22	2008	Chinese	Shanghai International Circuit	1	1	McLaren-Mercedes	
23	2009	Hungarian	Hungaroring	4	1	McLaren-Mercedes	
24	2009	European	Valencia Street Circuit	1	2	McLaren-Mercedes	
25	2009	Singapore	Marina Bay Street Circuit	1	1	McLaren-Mercedes	
26	2009	Japanese	Suzuka International Racing Course	3	3	McLaren-Mercedes	
27	2009	Brazilian	Interlagos Circuit	17	3	McLaren-Mercedes	
28	2010	Bahrain	Bahrain International Circuit	4	3	McLaren-Mercedes	
29	2010	Chinese	Shanghai International Circuit	6	2	McLaren-Mercedes	
30	2010	Turkish	Istanbul Park	2	1	McLaren-Mercedes	
31	2010	Canadian	Circuit Gilles Villeneuve	1	1	McLaren-Mercedes	
32	2010	European	Valencia Street Circuit	3	2	McLaren-Mercedes	
33	2010	British	Silverstone Circuit	4	2	McLaren-Mercedes	
34	2010	Belgian	Circuit de Spa-Francorchamps	2	1	McLaren-Mercedes	
35	2010	Korean	Korea International Circuit	4	3	McLaren-Mercedes	
36	2010	Abu Dhabi	Yas Marina Circuit	2	2	McLaren-Mercedes	
37	2011	Australian	Albert Park Circuit	2	2	McLaren-Mercedes	
38	2011	Chinese	Shanghai International Circuit	3	1	McLaren-Mercedes	
39	2011	Spanish	Circuit de Barcelona-Catalunya	3	2	McLaren-Mercedes	
40	2011	German	Nürburgring	2	1	McLaren-Mercedes	
41	2011	Korean	Korea International Circuit	1	2	McLaren-Mercedes	
42	2011	Abu Dhabi	Yas Marina Circuit	2	1	McLaren-Mercedes	
43	2012	Australian	Albert Park Circuit	1	3	McLaren-Mercedes	
44	2012	Malaysian	Sepang International Circuit	1	3	McLaren-Mercedes	
45	2012	Chinese	Shanghai International Circuit	7	3	McLaren-Mercedes	
46	2012	Canadian	Circuit Gilles Villeneuve	2	1	McLaren-Mercedes	
47	2012	Hungarian	Hungaroring	1	1	McLaren-Mercedes	
48	2012	Italian	Autodromo Nazionale di Monza	1	1	McLaren-Mercedes	
49	2012	United States	Circuit of the Americas	2	1	McLaren-Mercedes	
50	2013	Malaysian	Sepang International Circuit	4	3	Mercedes	
51	2013	Chinese	Shanghai International Circuit	1	3	Mercedes	
52	2013	Canadian	Circuit Gilles Villeneuve	2	3	Mercedes	
53	2013	Hungarian	Hungaroring	1	1	Mercedes	
54	2013	Belgian	Circuit de Spa-Francorchamps	1	2	Mercedes	
55	2014	Malaysian	Sepang International Circuit	1	1	Mercedes	
56	2014	Bahrain	Bahrain International Circuit	2	1	Mercedes	
57	2014	Chinese	Shanghai International Circuit	1	1	Mercedes	
58	2014	Spanish	Circuit de Barcelona-Catalunya	1	1	Mercedes	
59	2014	Monaco	Circuit de Monaco	2	2	Mercedes	
60	2014	Austrian	Red Bull Ring	9	2	Mercedes	
61	2014	British	Silverstone Circuit	6	1	Mercedes	
62	2014	German	Hockenheimring	20	3	Mercedes	
63	2014	Hungarian	Hungaroring	22	3	Mercedes	
64	2014	Italian	Autodromo Nazionale di Monza	1	1	Mercedes	
65	2014	Singapore	Marina Bay Street Circuit	1	1	Mercedes	
66	2014	Japanese	Suzuka International Racing Course	2	1	Mercedes	
67	2014	Russian	Sochi Autodrom	1	1	Mercedes	
68	2014	United States	Circuit of the Americas	2	1	Mercedes	
69	2014	Brazilian	Interlagos Circuit	2	2	Mercedes	
70	2014	Abu Dhabi	Yas Marina Circuit	2	1	Mercedes	
71	2015	Australian	Albert Park Circuit	1	1	Mercedes	
72	2015	Malaysian	Sepang International Circuit	1	2	Mercedes	
73	2015	Chinese	Shanghai International Circuit	1	1	Mercedes	
74	2015	Bahrain	Bahrain International Circuit	1	1	Mercedes	
75	2015	Spanish	Circuit de Barcelona-Catalunya	2	2	Mercedes	
76	2015	Monaco	Circuit de Monaco	1	3	Mercedes	
77	2015	Canadian	Circuit Gilles Villeneuve	1	1	Mercedes	
78	2015	Austrian	Red Bull Ring	1	2	Mercedes	
79	2015	British	Silverstone Circuit	1	1	Mercedes	
80	2015	Belgian	Circuit de Spa-Francorchamps	1	1	Mercedes	
81	2015	Italian	Autodromo Nazionale di Monza	1	1	Mercedes	
82	2015	Japanese	Suzuka International Racing Course	2	1	Mercedes	
83	2015	Russian	Sochi Autodrom	2	1	Mercedes	
84	2015	United States	Circuit of the Americas	2	1	Mercedes	
85	2015	Mexican	Autódromo Hermanos Rodríguez	2	2	Mercedes	
86	2015	Brazilian	Interlagos Circuit	2	2	Mercedes	
87	2015	Abu Dhabi	Yas Marina Circuit	2	2	Mercedes	
88	2016	Australian	Albert Park Circuit	1	2	Mercedes	
89	2016	Bahrain	Bahrain International Circuit	1	3	Mercedes	
90	2016	Russian	Sochi Autodrom	10	2	Mercedes	
91	2016	Monaco	Circuit de Monaco	3	1	Mercedes	
92	2016	Canadian	Circuit Gilles Villeneuve	1	1	Mercedes	
93	2016	Austrian	Red Bull Ring	1	1	Mercedes	
94	2016	British	Silverstone Circuit	1	1	Mercedes	
95	2016	Hungarian	Hungaroring	2	1	Mercedes	
96	2016	German	Hockenheimring	2	1	Mercedes	
97	2016	Belgian	Circuit de Spa-Francorchamps	21	3	Mercedes	
98	2016	Italian	Autodromo Nazionale di Monza	1	2	Mercedes	
99	2016	Singapore	Marina Bay Street Circuit	3	3	Mercedes	
100	2016	Japanese	Suzuka International Racing Course	2	3	Mercedes	
101	2016	United States	Circuit of the Americas	1	1	Mercedes	
102	2016	Mexican	Autódromo Hermanos Rodríguez	1	1	Mercedes	
103	2016	Brazilian	Interlagos Circuit	1	1	Mercedes	
104	2016	Abu Dhabi	Yas Marina Circuit	1	1	Mercedes	
105	2017	Australian	Albert Park Circuit	1	2	Mercedes	
106	2017	Chinese	Shanghai International Circuit	1	1	Mercedes	
107	2017	Bahrain	Bahrain International Circuit	2	2	Mercedes	
108	2017	Spanish	Circuit de Barcelona-Catalunya	1	1	Mercedes	
109	2017	Canadian	Circuit Gilles Villeneuve	1	1	Mercedes	
110	2017	British	Silverstone Circuit	1	1	Mercedes	
111	2017	Belgian	Circuit de Spa-Francorchamps	1	1	Mercedes	
112	2017	Italian	Autodromo Nazionale di Monza	1	1	Mercedes	
113	2017	Singapore	Marina Bay Street Circuit	5	1	Mercedes	
114	2017	Malaysian	Sepang International Circuit	1	2	Mercedes	
115	2017	Japanese	Suzuka International Racing Course	1	1	Mercedes	
116	2017	United States	Circuit of the Americas	1	1	Mercedes	
117	2017	Abu Dhabi	Yas Marina Circuit	2	2	Mercedes	
118	2018	Australian	Albert Park Circuit	1	2	Mercedes	
119	2018	Bahrain	Bahrain International Circuit	9	3	Mercedes	
120	2018	Azerbaijan	Baku City Circuit	2	1	Mercedes	
121	2018	Spanish	Circuit de Barcelona-Catalunya	1	1	Mercedes	
122	2018	Monaco	Circuit de Monaco	3	3	Mercedes	
123	2018	French	Circuit Paul Ricard	1	1	Mercedes	
124	2018	British	Silverstone Circuit	1	2	Mercedes	
125	2018	German	Hockenheimring	14	1	Mercedes	
126	2018	Hungarian	Hungaroring	1	1	Mercedes	
127	2018	Belgian	Circuit de Spa-Francorchamps	1	2	Mercedes	
128	2018	Italian	Autodromo Nazionale di Monza	3	1	Mercedes	
129	2018	Singapore	Marina Bay Street Circuit	1	1	Mercedes	
130	2018	Russian	Sochi Autodrom	2	1	Mercedes	
131	2018	Japanese	Suzuka International Racing Course	1	1	Mercedes	
132	2018	United States	Circuit of the Americas	1	3	Mercedes	
133	2018	Brazil	Interlagos Circuit	1	1	Mercedes	
134	2018	Abu Dhabi	Yas Marina Circuit	1	1	Mercedes	
135	2019	Australian	Albert Park Circuit	1	2	Mercedes	
136	2019	Bahrain	Bahrain International Circuit	3	1	Mercedes	
137	2019	Chinese	Shanghai International Circuit	2	1	Mercedes	
138	2019	Azerbaijan	Baku City Circuit	2	2	Mercedes	
139	2019	Spanish	Circuit de Barcelona-Catalunya	2	1	Mercedes	
140	2019	Monaco	Circuit de Monaco	1	1	Mercedes	
141	2019	Canadian	Circuit Gilles Villeneuve	2	1	Mercedes	
142	2019	French	Circuit Paul Ricard	1	1	Mercedes	
143	2019	British	Silverstone Circuit	2	1	Mercedes	
144	2019	Hungarian	Hungaroring	3	1	Mercedes	
145	2019	Belgian	Circuit de Spa-Francorchamps	3	2	Mercedes	
146	2019	Italian	Autodromo Nazionale di Monza	2	3	Mercedes	
147	2019	Russian	Sochi Autodrom	2	1	Mercedes	
148	2019	Japanese	Suzuka International Racing Course	4	3	Mercedes	
149	2019	Mexican	Autódromo Hermanos Rodríguez	3	1	Mercedes	
150	2019	United States	Circuit of the Americas	5	2	Mercedes	
151	2019	Abu Dhabi	Yas Marina Circuit	1	1	Mercedes	
152	2020	Styrian	Red Bull Ring	1	1	Mercedes	
153	2020	Hungarian	Hungaroring	1	1	Mercedes	
154	2020	British	Silverstone Circuit	1	1	Mercedes	
155	2020	70th Anniversary	Silverstone Circuit	4	2	Mercedes	
156	2020	Spanish	Circuit de Barcelona-Catalunya	1	1	Mercedes	
157	2020	Belgian	Circuit de Spa-Francorchamps	1	1	Mercedes	
158	2020	Tuscan	Mugello Circuit	1	1	Mercedes	
159	2020	Russian	Sochi Autodrom	1	3	Mercedes	
160	2020	Eifel	Nürburgring	2	1	Mercedes	
161	2020	Portuguese	Algarve International Circuit	1	1	Mercedes	
162	2020	Emilia Romagna	Imola Circuit	2	1	Mercedes	
163	2020	Turkish	Istanbul Park	6	1	Mercedes	
164	2020	Bahrain	Bahrain International Circuit	1	1	Mercedes	
165	2020	Abu Dhabi	Yas Marina Circuit	3	3	Mercedes	
166	2021	Bahrain	Bahrain International Circuit	2	1	Mercedes	
167	2021	Emilia Romagna	Imola Circuit	1	2	Mercedes	
168	2021	Portuguese	Algarve International Circuit	2	1	Mercedes	
169	2021	Spanish	Circuit de Barcelona-Catalunya	1	1	Mercedes	
170	2021	French	Circuit Paul Ricard	2	2	Mercedes	
171	2021	Styrian	Red Bull Ring	2	2	Mercedes	
172	2021	British	Silverstone Circuit	2	1	Mercedes	
173	2021	Hungarian	Hungaroring	1	2	Mercedes	
174	2021	Belgian	Circuit de Spa-Francorchamps	3	3	Mercedes	
175	2021	Dutch	Circuit Zandvoort	2	2	Mercedes	
176	2021	Russian	Sochi Autodrom	4	1	Mercedes	
177	2021	United States	Circuit of the Americas	2	2	Mercedes	
178	2021	Mexico City	Autódromo Hermanos Rodríguez	2	2	Mercedes	
179	2021	São Paulo	Interlagos Circuit	10	1	Mercedes	
180	2021	Qatar	Losail International Circuit	1	1	Mercedes	
181	2021	Saudi Arabian	Jeddah Corniche Circuit	1	1	Mercedes	
182	2021	Abu Dhabi	Yas Marina Circuit	2	2	Mercedes	
183	2022	Bahrain	Bahrain International Circuit	5	3	Mercedes	
184	2022	Canadian	Circuit Gilles Villeneuve	4	3	Mercedes	
185	2022	British	Silverstone Circuit	5	3	Mercedes	
186	2022	Austrian	Red Bull Ring	8	3	Mercedes	
187	2022	French	Circuit Paul Ricard	4	2	Mercedes	
188	2022	Hungarian	Hungaroring	7	2	Mercedes	
189	2022	United States	Circuit of the Americas	3	2	Mercedes	
190	2022	Mexico City	Autódromo Hermanos Rodríguez	3	2	Mercedes	
191	2022	São Paulo	Interlagos Circuit	2	2	Mercedes	
192	2023	Australian	Albert Park Circuit	3	2	Mercedes	
193	2023	Spanish	Circuit de Barcelona-Catalunya	4	2	Mercedes	
194	2023	Canadian	Circuit Gilles Villeneuve	3	3	Mercedes	
195	2023	British	Silverstone Circuit	7	3	Mercedes	
196	2023	Singapore	Marina Bay Circuit	5	3	Mercedes	
197	2023	Mexico City	Autódromo Hermanos Rodríguez	6	2	Mercedes	
198	2024	Spanish	Circuit de Barcelona-Catalunya	3	3	Mercedes	
199	2024	British	Silverstone Circuit	2	1	Mercedes	
200	2024	Hungarian	Hungaroring	5	3	Mercedes	
201	2024	Belgian	Circuit de Spa-Francorchamps	3	1	Mercedes	
202	2024	Las Vegas	Las Vegas Strip Circuit	10	2	Mercedes	
203	2026	Chinese	Shanghai International Circuit	3	3	Ferrari	
204	2026	Canadian	Circuit Gilles Villeneuve	5	2	Ferrari	
205	2026	Monaco	Circuit de Monaco	3	2	Ferrari	
206	2026	Barcelona-Catalunya	Circuit de Barcelona-Catalunya	2	1	Ferrari	
207	2026	British	Silverstone Circuit	3	3	Ferrari	
208	2026	Bahrain	Sepang International Circuit	2	3	Ferrari	
209	2026	Mexico City	Autódromo Hermanos Rodríguez	1	2	Ferrari	

=== Pole positions ===
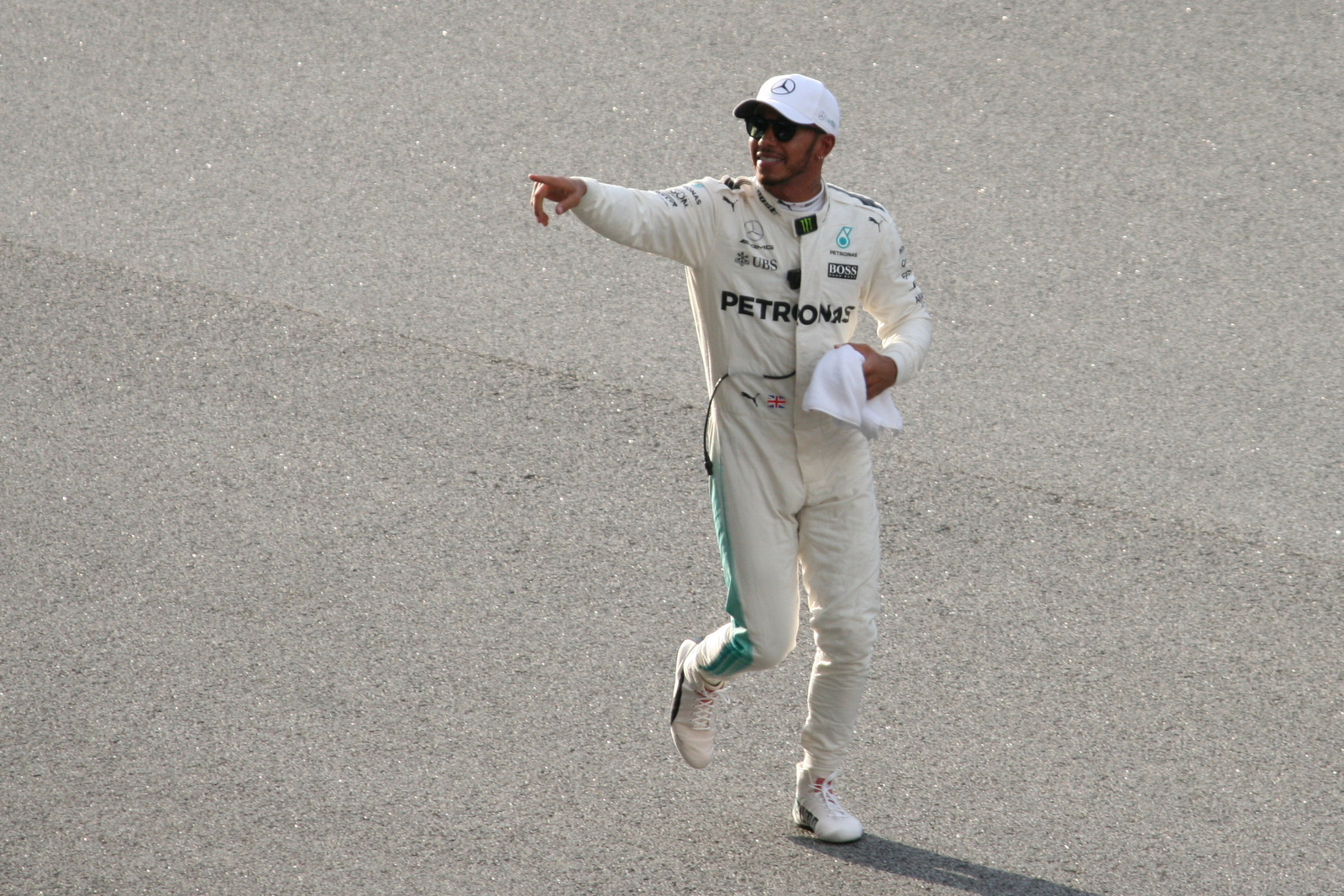
Hamilton celebrating 2017 Malaysian Grand Prix pole position

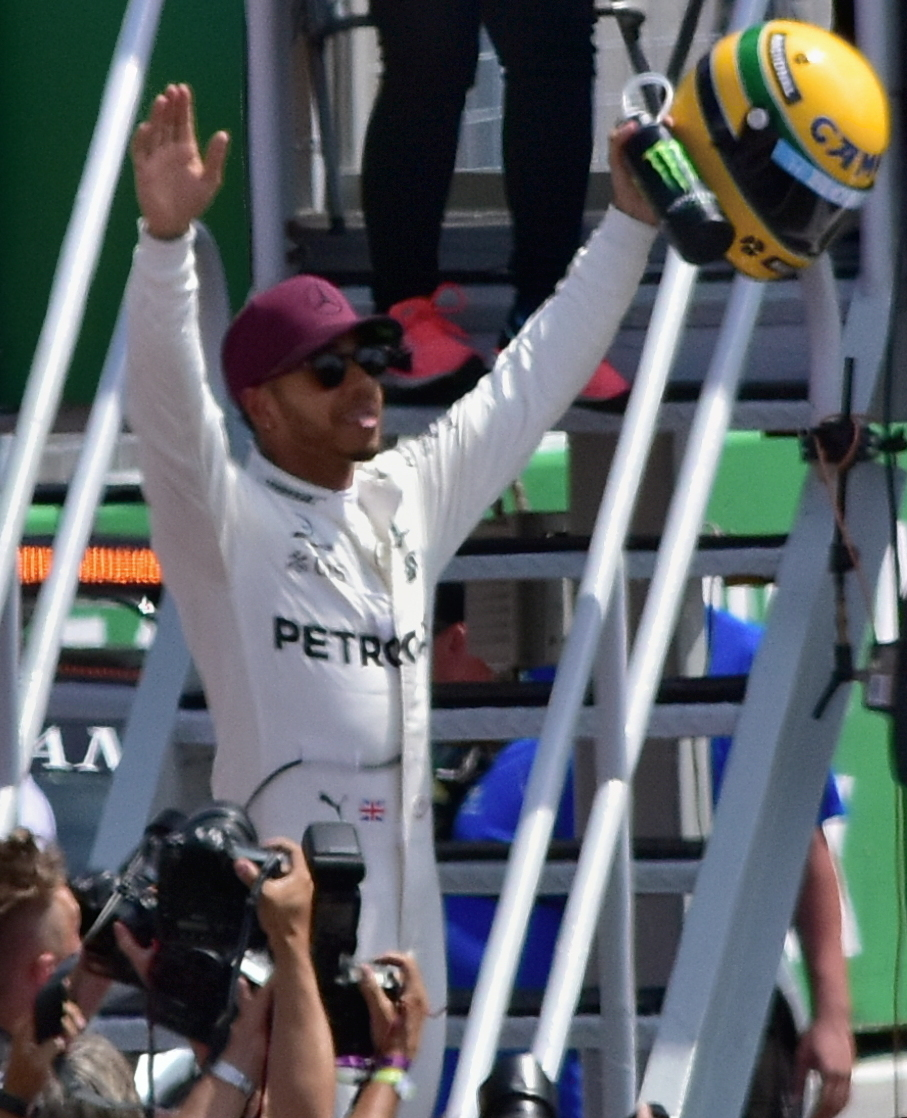
Hamilton celebrating 2017 Canadian Grand Prix pole position

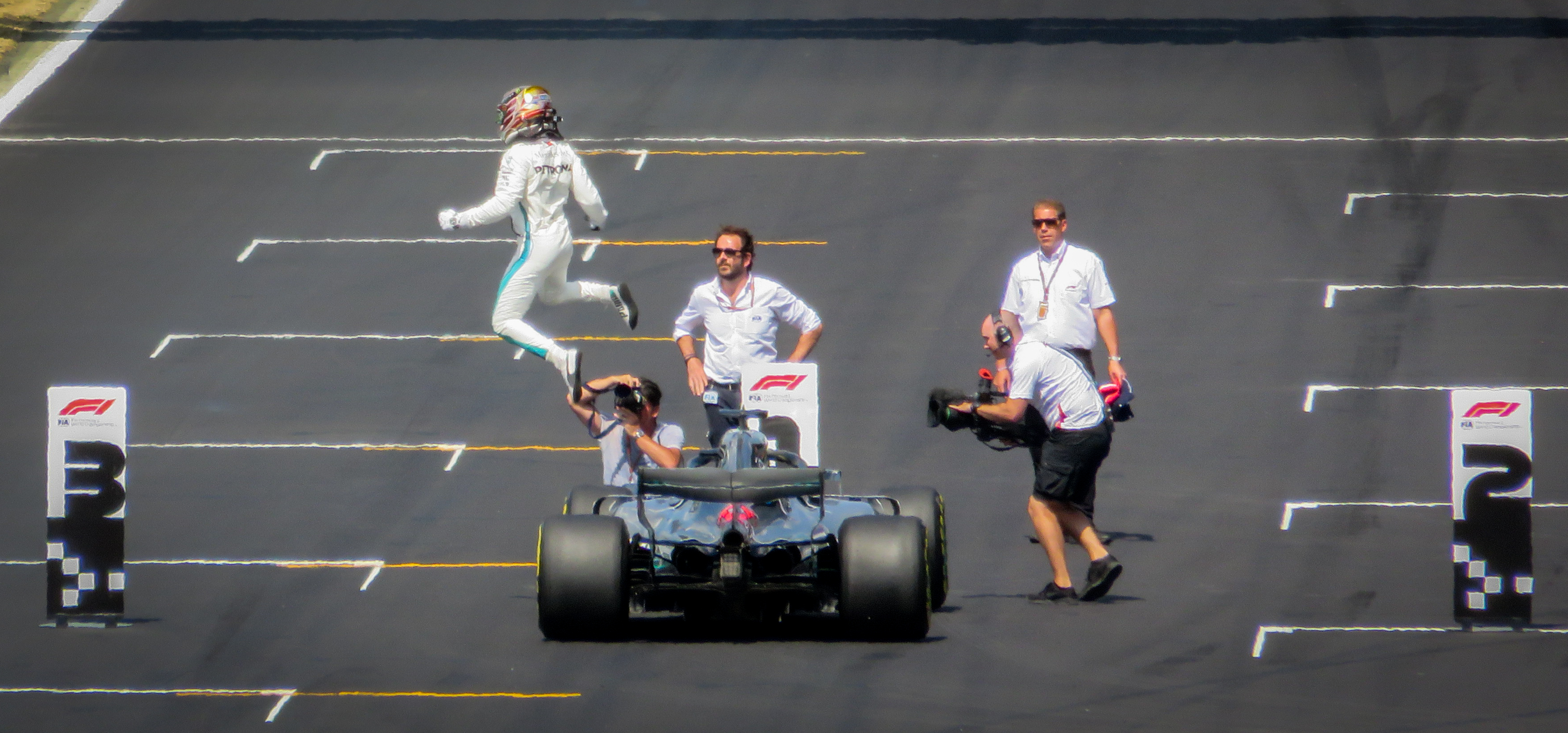
Hamilton celebrating 2018 British Grand Prix pole position

No.	Season	Grand Prix	Circuit	Time	Final	Constructor	Ref.
1	2007	Canadian	Circuit Gilles Villeneuve	1:15:707	1	McLaren-Mercedes	
2	2007	United States	Indianapolis Motor Speedway	1:12.331	1	McLaren-Mercedes	
3	2007	British	Silverstone Circuit	1:19.997	3	McLaren-Mercedes	
4	2007	Hungarian	Hungaroring	1:19.781	1	McLaren-Mercedes	
5	2007	Japanese	Fuji Speedway	1:25.368	1	McLaren-Mercedes	
6	2007	Chinese	Shanghai International Circuit	1:35.908	Ret	McLaren-Mercedes	
7	2008	Australian	Albert Park Circuit	1:26.714	1	McLaren-Mercedes	
8	2008	Canadian	Circuit Gilles Villeneuve	1:17.886	Ret	McLaren-Mercedes	
9	2008	German	Hockenheimring	1:15.666	1	McLaren-Mercedes	
10	2008	Hungarian	Hungaroring	1:20.899	5	McLaren-Mercedes	
11	2008	Belgian	Circuit de Spa-Francorchamps	1:47.338	3	McLaren-Mercedes	
12	2008	Japanese	Fuji Speedway	1:18.404	12	McLaren-Mercedes	
13	2008	Chinese	Shanghai International Circuit	1:36.303	1	McLaren-Mercedes	
14	2009	European	Valencia Street Circuit	1:39.489	2	McLaren-Mercedes	
15	2009	Italian	Autodromo Nazionale di Monza	1:24.066	12	McLaren-Mercedes	
16	2009	Singapore	Marina Bay Street Circuit	1:47.891	1	McLaren-Mercedes	
17	2009	Abu Dhabi	Yas Marina Circuit	1:40.948	Ret	McLaren-Mercedes	
18	2010	Canadian	Circuit Gilles Villeneuve	1:15.105	1	McLaren-Mercedes	
19	2011	Korean	Korea International Circuit	1:35.820	2	McLaren-Mercedes	
20	2012	Australian	Albert Park Circuit	1:24.922	3	McLaren-Mercedes	
21	2012	Malaysian	Sepang International Circuit	1:36.219	3	McLaren-Mercedes	
22	2012	Hungarian	Hungaroring	1:20.953	1	McLaren-Mercedes	
23	2012	Italian	Autodromo Nazionale di Monza	1:24.010	1	McLaren-Mercedes	
24	2012	Singapore	Marina Bay Street Circuit	1:46.362	Ret	McLaren-Mercedes	
25	2012	Abu Dhabi	Yas Marina Circuit	1:40.630	Ret	McLaren-Mercedes	
26	2012	Brazilian	Interlagos Circuit	1:12:458	Ret	McLaren-Mercedes	
27	2013	Chinese	Shanghai International Circuit	1:34.484	3	Mercedes	
28	2013	British	Silverstone Circuit	1:29.607	4	Mercedes	
29	2013	German	Nürburgring	1:29.398	5	Mercedes	
30	2013	Hungarian	Hungaroring	1:19.388	1	Mercedes	
31	2013	Belgian	Circuit de Spa-Francorchamps	2:01.012	3	Mercedes	
32	2014	Australian	Albert Park Circuit	1:44.231	Ret	Mercedes	
33	2014	Malaysian	Sepang International Circuit	1:59.431	1	Mercedes	
34	2014	Chinese	Shanghai International Circuit	1:53.860	1	Mercedes	
35	2014	Spanish	Circuit de Barcelona-Catalunya	1:25.232	1	Mercedes	
36	2014	Italian	Autodromo Nazionale di Monza	1:24.109	1	Mercedes	
37	2014	Singapore	Marina Bay Street Circuit	1:45.681	1	Mercedes	
38	2014	Russian	Sochi Autodrom	1:38.513	1	Mercedes	
39	2015	Australian	Albert Park Circuit	1:26.327	1	Mercedes	
40	2015	Malaysian	Sepang International Circuit	1:49.834	2	Mercedes	
41	2015	Chinese	Shanghai International Circuit	1:35.782	1	Mercedes	
42	2015	Bahrain	Bahrain International Circuit	1:32.571	1	Mercedes	
43	2015	Monaco	Circuit de Monaco	1:15.098	3	Mercedes	
44	2015	Canadian	Circuit Gilles Villeneuve	1:14.393	1	Mercedes	
45	2015	Austrian	Red Bull Ring	1:08.455	2	Mercedes	
46	2015	British	Silverstone Circuit	1:32.248	1	Mercedes	
47	2015	Hungarian	Hungaroring	1:22.020	6	Mercedes	
48	2015	Belgian	Circuit de Spa-Francorchamps	1:47.197	1	Mercedes	
49	2015	Italian	Autodromo Nazionale di Monza	1:23.397	1	Mercedes	
50	2016	Australian	Albert Park Circuit	1:23.837	2	Mercedes	
51	2016	Bahrain	Bahrain International Circuit	1:29.493	3	Mercedes	
52	2016	Spanish	Circuit de Barcelona-Catalunya	1:22.000	Ret	Mercedes	
53	2016	Canadian	Circuit Gilles Villeneuve	1:12.812	1	Mercedes	
54	2016	Austrian	Red Bull Ring	1:07.922	1	Mercedes	
55	2016	British	Silverstone Circuit	1:29.287	1	Mercedes	
56	2016	Italian	Autodromo Nazionale di Monza	1:21.135	2	Mercedes	
57	2016	Malaysian	Sepang International Circuit	1:32.850	Ret	Mercedes	
58	2016	United States	Circuit of the Americas	1:34.999	1	Mercedes	
59	2016	Mexican	Autódromo Hermanos Rodríguez	1:18.704	1	Mercedes	
60	2016	Brazilian	Interlagos Circuit	1:10.736	1	Mercedes	
61	2016	Abu Dhabi	Yas Marina Circuit	1:38.755	1	Mercedes	
62	2017	Australian	Albert Park Circuit	1:22.188	2	Mercedes	
63	2017	Chinese	Shanghai International Circuit	1:31.678	1	Mercedes	
64	2017	Spanish	Circuit de Barcelona-Catalunya	1:19.149	1	Mercedes	
65	2017	Canadian	Circuit Gilles Villeneuve	1:11.459	1	Mercedes	
66	2017	Azerbaijan	Baku City Circuit	1:40.593	5	Mercedes	
67	2017	British	Silverstone Circuit	1:26.600	1	Mercedes	
68	2017	Belgian	Circuit de Spa-Francorchamps	1:42.553	1	Mercedes	
69	2017	Italian	Autodromo Nazionale di Monza	1:35.554	1	Mercedes	
70	2017	Malaysian	Sepang International Circuit	1:30.076	2	Mercedes	
71	2017	Japanese	Suzuka International Racing Course	1:27.319	1	Mercedes	
72	2017	United States	Circuit of the Americas	1:33.108	1	Mercedes	
73	2018	Australian	Albert Park Circuit	1:21.164	2	Mercedes	
74	2018	Spanish	Circuit de Barcelona-Catalunya	1:16.173	1	Mercedes	
75	2018	French	Circuit Paul Ricard	1:30.029	1	Mercedes	
76	2018	British	Silverstone Circuit	1:25.892	2	Mercedes	
77	2018	Hungarian	Hungaroring	1:35.658	1	Mercedes	
78	2018	Belgian	Circuit de Spa-Francorchamps	1:58.179	2	Mercedes	
79	2018	Singapore	Marina Bay Street Circuit	1:36.015	1	Mercedes	
80	2018	Japanese	Suzuka International Racing Course	1:27.760	1	Mercedes	
81	2018	United States	Circuit of the Americas	1:32.237	3	Mercedes	
82	2018	Brazilian	Interlagos Circuit	1:07.281	1	Mercedes	
83	2018	Abu Dhabi	Yas Marina Circuit	1:34.794	1	Mercedes	
84	2019	Australian	Albert Park Circuit	1:20.486	2	Mercedes	
85	2019	Monaco	Circuit de Monaco	1:10.166	1	Mercedes	
86	2019	French	Circuit Paul Ricard	1:28.319	1	Mercedes	
87	2019	German	Hockenheimring	1:11.767	9	Mercedes	
88	2019	Abu Dhabi	Yas Marina Circuit	1:34.779	1	Mercedes	
89	2020	Styrian	Red Bull Ring	1:19.273	1	Mercedes	
90	2020	Hungarian	Hungaroring	1:13.447	1	Mercedes	
91	2020	British	Silverstone Circuit	1:24.303	1	Mercedes	
92	2020	Spanish	Circuit de Barcelona-Catalunya	1:15.584	1	Mercedes	
93	2020	Belgian	Circuit de Spa-Francorchamps	1:41:252	1	Mercedes	
94	2020	Italian	Autodromo Nazionale di Monza	1:18:887	7	Mercedes	
95	2020	Tuscan	Mugello Circuit	1:15.144	1	Mercedes	
96	2020	Russian	Sochi Autodrom	1:31.304	3	Mercedes	
97	2020	Portuguese	Algarve International Circuit	1:16.652	1	Mercedes	
98	2020	Bahrain	Bahrain International Circuit	1:27.264	1	Mercedes	
99	2021	Emilia Romagna	Autodromo Internazionale Enzo e Dino Ferrari	1:14.672	2	Mercedes	
100	2021	Spanish	Circuit de Barcelona-Catalunya	1:16.741	1	Mercedes	
101	2021	Hungarian	Hungaroring	1:15.419	2	Mercedes	
102	2021	Qatar	Losail International Circuit	1:20.827	1	Mercedes	
103	2021	Saudi Arabian	Jeddah Corniche Circuit	1:27.511	1	Mercedes	
104	2023	Hungarian	Hungaroring	1:16.609	4	Mercedes	
105	2026	Mexico City	Autódromo Hermanos Rodríguez	1:16.514	2	Ferrari	

=== Records ===
Description	Record	Details	Ref.
Championships
Most World Championships	7 (Note: Record shared with Michael Schumacher.)	Record jointly-held since the 2020 season	
Longest time between first and last World Championship titles	12 years	Between 2008 and 2020	
Most races as championship leader	126	Record held since the 2021 Portuguese Grand Prix	
Most championships with one team	6 championships	Record held since the 2020 Turkish Grand Prix	
Winning World Championships across three decades	2000s, 2010s, 2020s	Record held since 2020 Turkish Grand Prix	
Wins
Most career wins	106	Record held since the 2020 Portuguese Grand Prix	
Most wins in a debut season	4 (Note: Record shared with Jacques Villeneuve in 1996.)	During the 2007 season	
Most wins with the same team	84	Record held since the 2020 Turkish Grand Prix	
Most wins at the same Grand Prix	9	British Grand Prix (2008, 2014–2017, 2019–2021, 2024)	
Most consecutive wins at the same Grand Prix	5 (Note: Record shared with Ayrton Senna (Monaco Grand Prix 1989-1993))	Spanish Grand Prix (2017–2021)	
Most wins at the same circuit	9	Silverstone (2008, 2014–2017, 2019–2021, 2024)	
Wins at most different circuits	31	Record held since the 2016 Brazilian Grand Prix	
Wins at most different Grands Prix	32	Record held since the 2018 French Grand Prix	
Most wins at a driver's national Grand Prix	9	British Grand Prix (2008, 2014–2017, 2019–2021, 2024)	
Most wins in a driver's home country	9	British Grand Prix (2008, 2014–2017, 2019–2021, 2024)	
Most wins from pole position	61	Record held since the 2017 United States Grand Prix	
Most wins in a season without winning the World Championship	10	During the 2016 season	
Most seasons with a win	17	2007–2021, 2024, 2026	
Most consecutive seasons with a win	15	From 2007–2021	
Most consecutive seasons with a win from debut season	15	From 2007–2021	
Most wins in one calendar month	4 (Note: Record shared with Max Verstappen.)	July 2016 (2016 Austrian Grand Prix – 2016 German Grand Prix)	
Longest time between first and last wins	19 years, 4 days	(2007 Canadian Grand Prix – 2026 Barcelona-Catalunya Grand Prix)	
Most wins with the same engine	105	Record held since the 2018 Abu Dhabi Grand Prix	
First driver to win a race in their 20s, 30s and 40s	Won a race in their 20s, 30s, 40s	Record held since the 2026 Barcelona-Catalunya Grand Prix	
Pole positions
Most pole positions	105	Record held since the 2017 Italian Grand Prix	
Most pole positions in a debut season	6	During the 2007 season	
Pole positions at most different Grands Prix	30	Record held since the 2017 Azerbaijan Grand Prix	
Pole positions at most different circuits	32	Record held since the 2018 French Grand Prix	
Most pole positions at the same Grand Prix	9	Hungarian Grand Prix (2007–2008, 2012–2013, 2015, 2018, 2020–2021, 2023)	
Most pole positions at the same circuit	9	Hungaroring (2007–2008, 2012–2013, 2015, 2018, 2020–2021, 2023)	
Most pole positions at a driver's national Grand Prix	7	British Grand Prix (2007, 2013, 2015–2018, 2020)	
Most seasons with a pole position	17	2007–2021, 2023, 2026	
Most consecutive seasons with a pole position	15	From 2007–2021	
Longest time between first and last pole positions	7,084 days	2007 Canadian Grand Prix – 2026 Mexico City Grand Prix)	
Most pole positions with the same engine	104	Record held since the 2019 Monaco Grand Prix	
Most pole positions with the same team	78	Record held since the 2019 Monaco Grand Prix	
Most pole positions without win	44	Record held since the 2019 Australian Grand Prix	
Points
Most career points	5279.5	Record held since the 2016 Austrian Grand Prix	
Most consecutive seasons with points finishes	20	From 2007–2026. Record held since the 2023 Bahrain Grand Prix	
Most consecutive points finishes from a debut race	9	2007 Australian Grand Prix – 2007 British Grand Prix	
Most seasons with points scored in every race	2	2017 and 2019	
Fewest races before scoring points	1 (Note: Record shared with 81 other drivers)	Record jointly-held since the 2007 Australian Grand Prix	
Most races finished in the points	353	Record held since the 2020 Tuscan Grand Prix	
Most consecutive points finishes	48	2018 British Grand Prix – 2020 Bahrain Grand Prix	
Most consecutive points finishes (without sprints)	48	2018 British Grand Prix – 2020 Bahrain Grand Prix	
Highest percentage of points-scoring races	88.25%		
Most points with one team	3949.5		
Most points with the same engine	4862.5		
Podium finishes
Most podium finishes	209	Record held since the 2020 Spanish Grand Prix	
Most consecutive podium finishes from debut	9	2007 Australian Grand Prix – 2007 British Grand Prix	
Most podiums in a debut season	12	Record held since the 2007 Japanese Grand Prix	
Most podium finishes with the same team	153	Record held since the 2021 Bahrain Grand Prix	
Most podium finishes at a driver's national Grand Prix	15	British Grand Prix (2007–2008, 2010, 2014–2024, 2026)	
Podiums at most different Grands Prix	38	Record held since the 70th Anniversary Grand Prix	
Podiums at most different circuits	36	Record held since the 2020 Portuguese Grand Prix	
Most podiums at the same Grand Prix	15	British Grand Prix (2007–2008, 2010, 2014–2024, 2026)	
Most consecutive podiums at the same Grand Prix	11	British Grand Prix (2014–2024)	
Most podiums at the same circuit	16	Silverstone (2007–2008, 2010, 2014–2024, 2026)	
Most consecutive podiums at the same circuit	12	Silverstone (2014–2024)	
Most seasons with a podium finish	19	2007–2024, 2026	
Most consecutive seasons with a podium finish	18	From 2007–2024. Record held since the 2022 Bahrain Grand Prix	
Fewest races before first podium	1 (Note: Record shared with 22 other drivers)	Record jointly-held since the 2007 Australian Grand Prix	
Most 2nd positions	60	Record held since the 2021 Hungarian Grand Prix	
Most 2nd and 3rd positions	103		
Most podiums with the same engine	202	Record held since the 2017 Abu Dhabi Grand Prix	
Entries and starts
Most consecutive race starts	265	Record held since the 2017 Brazilian Grand Prix	
Most front row starts	179	Record held since the 2017 United States Grand Prix	
Most front row starts in a debut season	12	During the 2007 season	
Most races with a single engine manufacturer	356	With Mercedes. Record held since the 2017 Monaco Grand Prix	
Most races with a single constructor	246	With Mercedes. Record held since the 2022 Australian Grand Prix	
Lead
Most races led	195	Record held since the 2019 Russian Grand Prix	
Most races led from start to finish	23	Record held since the 2020 British Grand Prix	
Most consecutive races with at least one lap in the lead	18	2014 Hungarian Grand Prix – 2015 British Grand Prix	
Most consecutive races with at least one lap in the lead from debut race	7	2007 Australia Grand Prix – 2007 USA Grand Prix	
Most laps led	5,530	Record held since the 2021 Bahrain Grand Prix	
Most laps led at the same Grand Prix	487	Hungarian Grand Prix	
Most laps led at the same circuit	487	Hungaroring	
Longest distance led (km)	28,169	Record held since the 2020 Belgian Grand Prix	
Longest distance led at the same Grand Prix (km)	2,134	Hungarian Grand Prix	
Longest distance led at the same circuit (km)	2,134	Hungaroring	
Fewest races before leading	1 (Note: Record shared with 11 other drivers)	Record jointly-held since the 2007 Australian Grand Prix	
Most seasons with at least one lap in the lead	20	2007 – 2026	
Most consecutive seasons with at least one lap in the lead	20	2007 – 2026	
Fastest laps
Fastest laps at most different Grands Prix	28	Record held since the 2021 Styrian Grand Prix	
Fastest laps at most different circuits	27	Record held since the 2020 Emilia Romagna Grand Prix	
Most fastest laps at the same Grand Prix	7 (Note: Record shared with Nigel Mansell at the British Grand Prix and Michael Schumacher at the Spanish Grand Prix)	Italian Grand Prix (2011, 2013–2015, 2018–2020)	
Most fastest laps at the same circuit	7 (Note: Record shared with Michael Schumacher at Circuit de Catalunya)	Monza (2011, 2013–2015, 2018–2020)	
Most seasons with a fastest lap	19	2007–2008, 2010–2026	
Most consecutive seasons with a fastest lap	17	2010–2026	
Most fastest laps with the same engine	67	Record held since the 2021 Emilia Romagna Grand Prix	
Most fastest laps for a single constructor	55	Record held since the 2024 Monaco Grand Prix	
Other
Total career race finishes	362	Record held since the 2025 Monaco Grand Prix	
Most classified finishes	366 (Note: Record shared with Fernando Alonso.)	Record held since the 2026 Mexico City Grand Prix	
Most consecutive race finishes	48	2018 British Grand Prix – 2020 Bahrain Grand Prix	
Most consecutive race classifications	48	2018 British Grand Prix – 2020 Bahrain Grand Prix	
Most seasons finishing every Grand Prix	2	2017 and 2019	
Most grand slams in a season	3 (Note: Record shared with Alberto Ascari in 1952, Jim Clark in 1963 and 1965, Nigel Mansell in 1992.)	Record jointly-held since the 2017 British Grand Prix	

== GP2 Series ==
=== Wins ===
No.	Season	Race	Circuit	Grid	Team	Ref.
1	2006	European Feature race	Nürburgring	3	ART Grand Prix	
2	2006	European Sprint race	Nürburgring	8	ART Grand Prix	
3	2006	Monaco Feature race	Circuit de Monaco	1	ART Grand Prix	
4	2006	Silverstone Feature race	Silverstone Circuit	2	ART Grand Prix	
5	2006	Silverstone Sprint race	Silverstone Circuit	8	ART Grand Prix	

=== Podiums ===
No.	Season	Race	Circuit	Grid	Final	Team	Ref.
1	2006	Valencia Feature race	Circuit Ricardo Tormo	3	2	ART Grand Prix	
2	2006	European Feature race	Nürburgring	3	1	ART Grand Prix	
3	2006	European Sprint race	Nürburgring	8	1	ART Grand Prix	
4	2006	Catalunya Feature race	Circuit de Barcelona-Catalunya	4	2	ART Grand Prix	
5	2006	Monaco Feature race	Circuit de Monaco	1	1	ART Grand Prix	
6	2006	Silverstone Feature race	Silverstone Circuit	2	1	ART Grand Prix	
7	2006	Silverstone Sprint race	Silverstone Circuit	8	1	ART Grand Prix	
8	2006	Hockenheim Feature race	Hockenheimring	8	2	ART Grand Prix	
9	2006	Hockenheim Sprint race	Hockenheimring	7	3	ART Grand Prix	
10	2006	Hungaroring Sprint race	Hungaroring	10	2	ART Grand Prix	
11	2006	Istanbul Feature race	Istanbul Park	5	2	ART Grand Prix	
12	2006	Istanbul Sprint race	Istanbul Park	7	2	ART Grand Prix	
13	2006	Monza Feature race	Autodromo Nazionale di Monza	3	3	ART Grand Prix	
14	2006	Monza Sprint race	Autodromo Nazionale di Monza	6	2	ART Grand Prix	

== Awards ==
- Autosport British Club Driver of the Year: 2003
- Autosport Rookie of the Year: 2006, 2007
- Autosport International Racing Driver Award: 2007, 2008, 2014, 2015, 2017, 2018, 2019, 2020
- Autosport British Competition Driver of the Year: 2007, 2013, 2014, 2015, 2016, 2017, 2018, 2022
- GQ Sportsman of the Year: 2007, 2014, 2015
- Segrave Trophy for Unprecedented Achievements in Debut Season in the FIA Formula One World Championship: 2007
- BRDC Gold Star Award, Era Club Trophy, Graham Hill Trophy, Richard Seaman Trophy: 2007
- Bild am Sonntag Golden Steering Wheel for Outstanding Achievement: 2007
- Square Mile Sports Awards ICAP Sportsperson of the Year: 2007
- SJA British Sports Awards Best International Newcomer: 2007
- SJA British Sports Awards Sportsman of the Year: 2007, 2020
- BBC East Sports Personality of the Year: 2007
- Confartigianato Motori Best Driver Award: 2007
- Autocar Motorsport Award: 2007, 2021
- Pride of Britain Award: 2007
- Bambi Award (Special Jury Prize): 2008
- Laureus World Sports Award for Breakthrough of the Year: 2008
- BRDC Gold Star Award, Era Club Trophy, Graham Hill Trophy, Richard Seaman Trophy, John Cobb Trophy: 2008
- BRDC John Cobb Trophy: 2009
- BRDC Chris Bristow Trophy, Graham Hill Trophy: 2010
- Confartigianato Motori Best Driver Award: 2011
- BRDC Era Club Trophy: 2012
- BRDC Gold Star Award, Richard Seaman Trophy: 2013
- BRDC Gold Star Award, Graham Hill Trophy, Richard Seaman Trophy, Johnny Wakefield Trophy: 2014
- PAP European Sportsperson of the Year: 2014, 2019
- BBC Sports Personality of the Year: 2014, 2020
- BRDC Gold Star Award, Graham Hill Trophy, Johnny Wakefield Trophy: 2015
- British Ethnic Diversity Sports Awards Lycamobile Sportsman of the Year: 2016
- Confartigianato Motori Best Driver Award: 2016
- BRDC Gold Star Award: 2016
- BRDC Gold Star Award, Johnny Wakefield Trophy: 2017
- FIA Hall of Fame induction: 2017
- Best Driver ESPY Award: 2017, 2021
- Gazzetta World Sportsman of the Year: 2018, 2020
- SJA British Sports Awards Chairman's Award: 2018
- BRDC Special Gold Star Award, Gold Star Award, Graham Hill Trophy: 2018
- PETA Person of the Year: 2018
- BRDC Special Gold Star Award, Gold Star Award, Graham Hill Trophy, Johnny Wakefield Trophy: 2019
- Honorary Fellow of the Royal Academy of Engineering: 2019
- GQ Germany Creativity & Design Award: 2019
- PETA Menswear Collaboration Award: 2019
- PETA Libby Award: 2019
- Laureus World Sportsman of the Year: 2020
- L'Équipe Champion of Champions: 2020
- British GQ Game Changer of the Year: 2020
- GQ India International Man of the Year: 2020
- Automobile Club d'Italia Trophy: 2020
- Sport Bild Star of the Year: 2020
- FIA President Award: 2020
- FIA Personality of the Year: 2014, 2018, 2020, 2021
- Laureus Athlete Advocate of the Year: 2021
- WSJ. Magazine Innovators Award: 2021
- BRDC Gold Star Award, Gold Medal, Graham Hill Trophy: 2021
- BRDC Gold Star Award, Johnny Wakefield Trophy: 2022
- Honorary Citizenship of Brazil: 2022
- FIA Action of the Year: 2022
- ESPN's Greatest British Athlete of the 21st Century: 2024
- Met Gala co-chair in 2025

== See also ==
- Hamilton–Rosberg rivalry
- List of Formula One driver records
