= 2021 Hungarian Grand Prix =

Eleventh round of the 2021 Formula One season

Race 11 of 22 (Note: At the time of the event Formula One planned to hold twenty-three Grands Prix.) in the 2021 Formula One World Championship
← Previous race	Next race →
- Layout of the Hungaroring

Race details
- Date: 1 August 2021
- Official name: Formula 1 Rolex Magyar Nagydíj 2021
- Location: Hungaroring; Mogyoród, Hungary
- Course: Permanent racing facility
- Course length: 4.381 km (2.722 miles)
- Distance: 70 laps, 306.630 km (190.531 miles)
- Weather: Rain and sunny. Ambient: 26 to 29 °C (79 to 84 °F); Surface: 31 to 52 °C (88 to 126 °F).
- Attendance: 130,000

Pole position
Driver	(United Kingdom) Lewis Hamilton	Mercedes
- Time: 1:15.419

Fastest lap
Driver	(France) Pierre Gasly	AlphaTauri-Honda
- Time: 1:18.394 on lap 70

Podium
First	(France) Esteban Ocon	Alpine-Renault
Second	(United Kingdom) Lewis Hamilton	Mercedes
Third	(Spain) Carlos Sainz Jr.	Ferrari

The 2021 Hungarian Grand Prix (officially known as the Formula 1 Rolex Magyar Nagydíj 2021) was a Formula One motor race, held on 1 August 2021 at the Hungaroring in Mogyoród, Hungary. It was the eleventh round of the 2021 Formula One World Championship, and it was won by Esteban Ocon for Alpine-Renault. The win was Ocon's first in Formula One, the first win for the Enstone-based team since the 2013 Australian Grand Prix, and the first win for a Renault-badged engine since the 2014 Belgian Grand Prix, with Hamilton and Carlos Sainz Jr. completing the podium after Sebastian Vettel was disqualified from second. Pierre Gasly earned the fastest lap, while Williams scored their first double points finish since the 2018 Italian Grand Prix and their first points of any kind since the 2019 German Grand Prix.

As of the 2026 Mexico City Grand Prix, Ocon's win remains his only, as well as the most recent achieved by a French driver in Formula One. It was also the last win achieved by a Renault-badged car in Formula One, as they would leave the sport at the end of 2025.

== Background ==
The event, which was held over the weekend of 30 July – 1 August at the Hungaroring, was the eleventh round of the 2021 World Championship, marking the thirty-sixth time the Hungarian Grand Prix has appeared on the World Championship calendar. Additional debris fencing was installed at the thirteenth corner before the event, while minor modifications were made to the pit lane entrance and exit.

=== Championship standings before the race ===
After title contenders Max Verstappen (Red Bull Racing) and Lewis Hamilton (Mercedes) collided on the first lap of the British Grand Prix, Verstappen's lead in the World Drivers' Championship was reduced to eight points. They were followed by McLaren driver Lando Norris a further sixty-four points back, and Hamilton's teammate Valtteri Bottas five points behind Norris.

Further, Mercedes had closed the gap between themselves and Red Bull in the World Constructors' Championship to four points. McLaren occupied third, 122 points behind Mercedes, but fifteen points ahead of Scuderia Ferrari.

=== Entrants ===
The drivers and teams were the same as the season entry list, with no additional stand-in drivers for the race. Robert Kubica drove in the first practice session for Alfa Romeo Racing in place of Kimi Räikkönen.

=== Tyre choices ===
Sole tyre supplier Pirelli allocated the C2, C3, and C4 compounds of tyre to be used in the race.

== Practice ==
Free Practice 1 and 2 took place on 30 July at 11:30 CEST and 15:00 CEST respectively. Free Practice 3 was held on 31 July at 12:00 CEST.

== Qualifying ==
The first qualifying session took place on 31 July at 15:00 CEST. Hamilton qualified in pole position ahead of Bottas and Verstappen. Verstappen would start on the soft tyres after using them in the second segment, while Hamilton and Bottas would both start on the medium tyre compound. Pérez qualified fourth, ahead of Gasly. The second part of qualifying was stopped after a crash by Sainz, caused by a wind gust making the car unstable. Russell failed to progress past the first segment for the first time in 2021. Schumacher did not take part in the session because his car was damaged in a crash during free practice.

=== Qualifying classification ===
Pos.	No.	Driver	Constructor	Qualifying times			Final grid
Pos.	No.	Driver	Constructor	Q1	Q2	Q3	Final grid
1	44	(United Kingdom) Lewis Hamilton	Mercedes	1:16.424	1:16.553	1:15.419	1
2	77	(Finland) Valtteri Bottas	Mercedes	1:16.569	1:16.702	1:15.734	2
3	33	(Netherlands) Max Verstappen	Red Bull Racing-Honda	1:16.214	1:15.650	1:15.840	3
4	11	(Mexico) Sergio Pérez	Red Bull Racing-Honda	1:17.233	1:16.443	1:16.421	4
5	10	(France) Pierre Gasly	AlphaTauri-Honda	1:16.874	1:16.394	1:16.483	5
6	4	(United Kingdom) Lando Norris	McLaren-Mercedes	1:17.081	1:16.385	1:16.489	6
7	16	(Monaco) Charles Leclerc	Ferrari	1:17.084	1:16.574	1:16.496	7
8	31	(France) Esteban Ocon	Alpine-Renault	1:17.367	1:16.766	1:16.653	8
9	14	(Spain) Fernando Alonso	Alpine-Renault	1:17.123	1:16.541	1:16.715	9
10	5	(Germany) Sebastian Vettel	Aston Martin-Mercedes	1:17.105	1:16.794	1:16.750	10
11	3	(Australia) Daniel Ricciardo	McLaren-Mercedes	1:17.664	1:16.871	N/A	11
12	18	(Canada) Lance Stroll	Aston Martin-Mercedes	1:17.038	1:16.893	N/A	12
13	7	(Finland) Kimi Räikkönen	Alfa Romeo Racing-Ferrari	1:17.553	1:17.564	N/A	13
14	99	(Italy) Antonio Giovinazzi	Alfa Romeo Racing-Ferrari	1:17.776	1:17.583	N/A	14
15	55	(Spain) Carlos Sainz Jr.	Ferrari	1:16.649	No time	N/A	15
16	22	(Japan) Yuki Tsunoda	AlphaTauri-Honda	1:17.919	N/A	N/A	16
17	63	(United Kingdom) George Russell	Williams-Mercedes	1:17.944	N/A	N/A	17
18	6	(Canada) Nicholas Latifi	Williams-Mercedes	1:18.036	N/A	N/A	18
19	9	(Russian Automobile Federation) Nikita Mazepin (Note: Nikita Mazepin is Russian, but he competed as a neutral competitor using the designation RAF (Russian Automobile Federation), as the Court of Arbitration for Sport upheld a ban on Russia competing at World Championships. The ban was implemented by the World Anti-Doping Agency in response to the state-sponsored doping program of Russian athletes.)	Haas-Ferrari	1:18.922	N/A	N/A	19
107% time: 1:21.548
—	47	(Germany) Mick Schumacher	Haas-Ferrari	No time	N/A	N/A	20^{1}

==== Notes ====
- ^1 – Mick Schumacher did not take part in qualifying due to an accident that occurred during the third practice session. He was permitted to race at the stewards' discretion. He also received a five-place grid penalty for an unscheduled gearbox change. This made no difference as he was already due to start the race from last place.

== Race ==
=== Report ===
The race started at 15:00 CEST on 1 August. It was held for seventy laps at the Hungaroring with Lewis Hamilton starting on pole position. Rain before and during the first lap led to all cars starting on intermediate tyres, Antonio Giovinazzi pitted for dry tyres at the end of the formation lap and subsequently started from the pit lane. The race began with major incidents at the first turn on the first lap; Valtteri Bottas braked late, causing him to hit the back of the McLaren of Lando Norris, sending Norris into Verstappen, who suffered damage but was able to continue. After hitting Norris, Bottas slid into the other Red Bull of Sergio Pérez, taking him out of the race. Lance Stroll also left his braking too late, and attempted to avoid a collision by taking to the grass on the inside, but collided with the Ferrari of Charles Leclerc, who then forced Daniel Ricciardo to spin as a result. When the safety car was called out, Pérez retired. After following two laps under the safety car, the race was red-flagged. Norris then retired under the red flag. The engine in Leclerc's car was written off as it was found to be damaged beyond repair. Verstappen's car had significant damage, greatly hampering his performance. As the cars came into the pit lane to change tyres and come out for the restart, an unsafe release from Alfa Romeo caused Kimi Räikkönen to collide with Nikita Mazepin, taking the Haas driver out of the race. Räikkönen was subsequently given a ten-second time penalty.

On the restart, only race leader Hamilton started from the grid on intermediate tyres; the rest of the grid started from the pits having changed to slick tyres. Hamilton pitted after the fourth lap, putting the Alpine of Ocon into the lead with Vettel chasing close behind. Hamilton made a pit stop for hard tyres on the nineteenth lap, allowing him to undercut Verstappen and Ricciardo when they stopped the following lap. Sainz overcut Latifi and Tsunoda, putting him into third behind Ocon and Vettel. Verstappen overtook Räikkönen to move up into eleventh place. Vettel and Ocon made pit stops for new tyres on the thirty-sixth and thirty-seventh laps, respectively. Hamilton fought his way up to fourth, then pitted on the forty-eighth lap, coming out behind Alonso. Alonso held him back for twelve laps after the fifty-third lap until the Spaniard locked up and Hamilton passed at the first turn. Hamilton overtook the Ferrari of Sainz on the sixty-seventh lap and moved into third. Gasly pitted on the sixty-eighth lap for fresh tyres and got the fastest lap on the last lap of the race. Ocon won the race from Vettel and Hamilton.

This was Ocon and Alpine's first victory, the first Grand Prix win for Team Enstone since the 2013 Australian Grand Prix, when they were known as Lotus F1, (Note: Alpine is the fourth incarnation of Team Enstone to win a Formula One World Championship Grand Prix, following Benetton Formula, Renault, and Lotus F1. This was the fiftieth win for the organisation under any name.) and Ocon's first win in any motor race since the 2015 GP3 Series. Ocon credited teammate Alonso for preventing Hamilton from catching him by the end of the race. It also marked the first victory for a French driver driving for a French team since Olivier Panis' triumph at the 1996 Monaco Grand Prix driving for the Ligier team as well as the first victory for a French driver driving a French car powered by a French engine since Alain Prost's triumph at the 1983 Austrian Grand Prix driving a Renault car.

The result allowed Mercedes to pass Red Bull for the lead of the Constructors' Championship. Williams moved up to eighth in the championship, ahead of Alfa Romeo, after both their drivers scored for the first time since 2018.

As a result of their roles in causing multiple-car collisions at the first turn of the opening lap, Bottas and Stroll were each given five-place grid penalties for the Belgian Grand Prix.

==== Post-race ====
During post-race scrutineering, stewards were unable to extract sufficient fuel from Sebastian Vettel's Aston Martin for a one-litre (0.22 imp gal; 0.26 US gal) sample requested by the rules. Vettel was therefore disqualified. This promoted Mercedes’ Hamilton to second and Ferrari's Sainz to third. Aston Martin initially appealed the disqualification, but later withdrew the appeal.

=== Race classification ===
Pos.	No.	Driver	Constructor	Laps	Time/Retired	Grid	Points
1	31	(France) Esteban Ocon	Alpine-Renault	70	2:04:43.199	8	25
2	44	(United Kingdom) Lewis Hamilton	Mercedes	70	+2.736	1	18
3	55	(Spain) Carlos Sainz Jr.	Ferrari	70	+15.018	15	15
4	14	(Spain) Fernando Alonso	Alpine-Renault	70	+15.651	9	12
5	10	(France) Pierre Gasly	AlphaTauri-Honda	70	+1:03.614	5	11^{1}
6	22	(Japan) Yuki Tsunoda	AlphaTauri-Honda	70	+1:15.803	16	8
7	6	(Canada) Nicholas Latifi	Williams-Mercedes	70	+1:17.910	18	6
8	63	(United Kingdom) George Russell	Williams-Mercedes	70	+1:19.094	17	4
9	33	(Netherlands) Max Verstappen	Red Bull Racing-Honda	70	+1:20.244	3	2
10	7	(Finland) Kimi Räikkönen	Alfa Romeo Racing-Ferrari	69	+1 lap	13	1
11	3	(Australia) Daniel Ricciardo	McLaren-Mercedes	69	+1 lap	11	
12	47	(Germany) Mick Schumacher	Haas-Ferrari	69	+1 lap	20	
13	99	(Italy) Antonio Giovinazzi	Alfa Romeo Racing-Ferrari	69	+1 lap	PL^{2}	
Ret	9	(Russian Automobile Federation) Nikita Mazepin	Haas-Ferrari	3	Collision	19	
Ret	4	(United Kingdom) Lando Norris	McLaren-Mercedes	2	Collision damage	6	
Ret	77	(Finland) Valtteri Bottas	Mercedes	0	Collision	2	
Ret	11	(Mexico) Sergio Pérez	Red Bull Racing-Honda	0	Collision	4	
Ret	16	(Monaco) Charles Leclerc	Ferrari	0	Collision	7	
Ret	18	(Canada) Lance Stroll	Aston Martin-Mercedes	0	Collision	12	
DSQ	5	(Germany) Sebastian Vettel	Aston Martin-Mercedes	70	Fuel sample^{3} (+1.918)	10	
Fastest lap: (France) Pierre Gasly (AlphaTauri-Honda) – 1:18.394 (lap 70)

==== Notes ====
- ^1 – Includes one point for fastest lap.
- ^2 – Antonio Giovinazzi qualified 14th, but his place on the grid was left vacant as he came into the pit during the formation lap.
- ^3 – Sebastian Vettel finished second on track, but was later disqualified because the required one-litre (0.22 imp gal; 0.26 US gal) fuel sample could not be extracted from his car during post-race scrutineering.

== Championship standings after the race ==
Drivers' Championship standings

	Pos.	Driver	Points
1	1	(United Kingdom) Lewis Hamilton	195
1	2	(Netherlands) Max Verstappen	187
Unchanged	3	(United Kingdom) Lando Norris	113
Unchanged	4	(Finland) Valtteri Bottas	108
Unchanged	5	(Mexico) Sergio Pérez	104

Constructors' Championship standings

	Pos.	Constructor	Points
1	1	(Germany) Mercedes	303
1	2	(Austria) Red Bull Racing-Honda	291
1	3	(Italy) Ferrari	163
1	4	(United Kingdom) McLaren-Mercedes	163
2	5	(France) Alpine-Renault	77

- Note: Only the top five positions are included for both sets of standings.

== See also ==
- 2021 Budapest Formula 3 round
- 2021 W Series Budapest round

== Notes ==
Previous race: 2021 British Grand Prix	FIA Formula One World Championship; 2021 season	Next race: 2021 Belgian Grand Prix
Previous race: 2020 Hungarian Grand Prix	Hungarian Grand Prix	Next race: 2022 Hungarian Grand Prix
