= 2020 British Grand Prix =

Formula One motor race held in 2020

Race 4 of 17 (Note: The outbreak of the COVID-19 pandemic saw several Grands Prix cancelled or rescheduled. The revised calendar consisted of seventeen races.) in the 2020 Formula One World Championship
← Previous race	Next race →
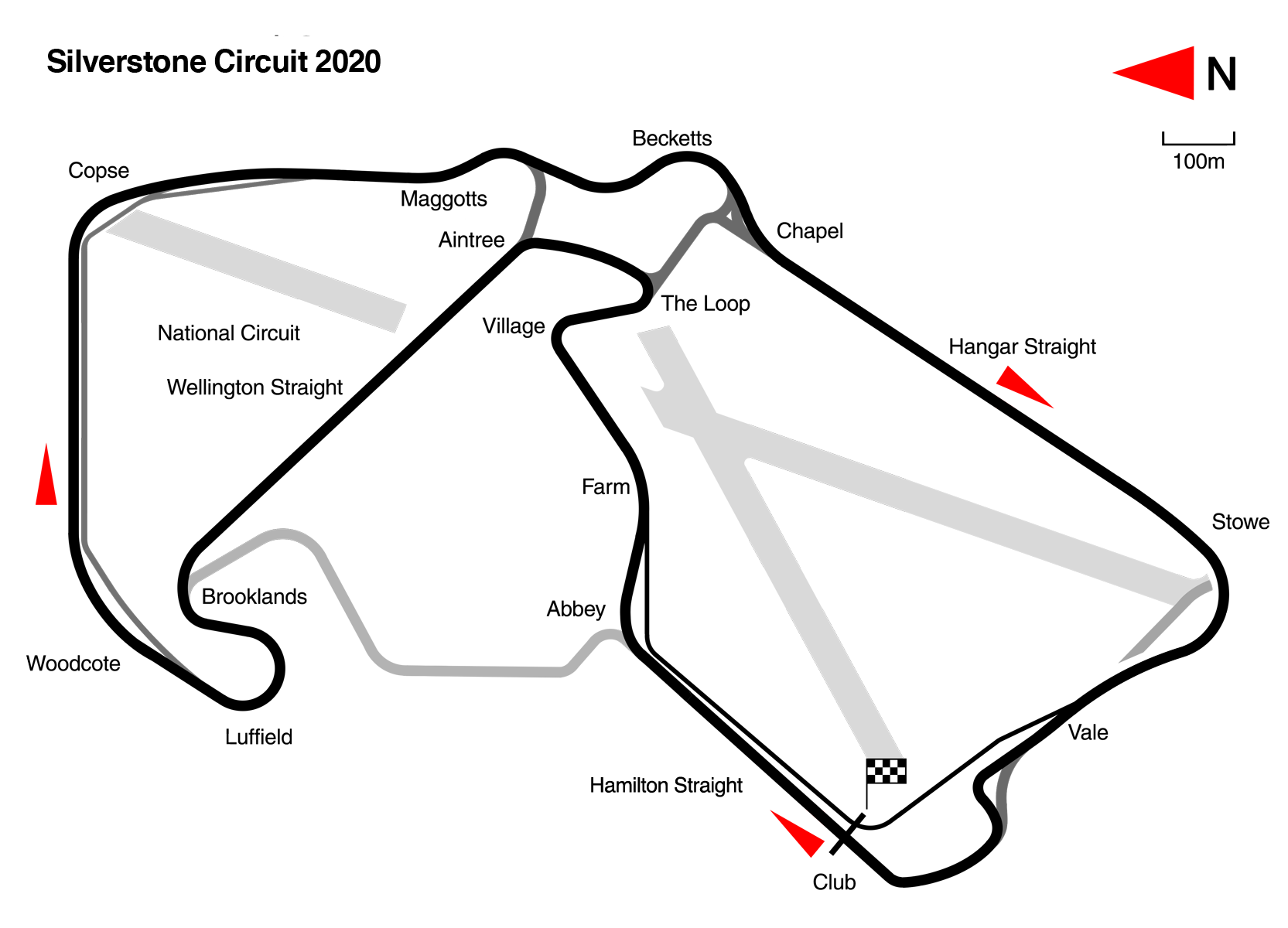
- Layout of the Silverstone Circuit

Race details
- Date: 2 August 2020
- Official name: Formula 1 Pirelli British Grand Prix 2020
- Location: Silverstone Circuit; Silverstone, United Kingdom
- Course: Permanent racing facility
- Course length: 5.891 km (3.660 miles)
- Distance: 52 laps, 306.198 km (190.263 miles)
- Weather: Partly cloudy
- Attendance: 0 (Note: The Grand Prix was held behind closed doors due to the COVID-19 pandemic in the United Kingdom.)

Pole position
Driver	(United Kingdom) Lewis Hamilton	Mercedes
- Time: 1:24.303

Fastest lap
Driver	(Netherlands) Max Verstappen	Red Bull Racing-Honda
- Time: 1:27.097 on lap 52 (lap record)

Podium
First	(United Kingdom) Lewis Hamilton	Mercedes
Second	(Netherlands) Max Verstappen	Red Bull Racing-Honda
Third	(Monaco) Charles Leclerc	Ferrari

The 2020 British Grand Prix (officially known as the Formula 1 Pirelli British Grand Prix 2020) was a Formula One motor race held on 2 August 2020 at the Silverstone Circuit in Silverstone, United Kingdom. It was the fourth round of the 2020 Formula One World Championship. The event was the seventy-first running of the British Grand Prix as part of the World Championship since 1950. The race was the first of two consecutive Formula One races at Silverstone with the 70th Anniversary Grand Prix following a week later. The defending race winner from the 2019 event, Lewis Hamilton, won the Grand Prix, his third consecutive win of the 2020 season, and Mercedes's fourth.

== Background ==
=== Impact of the COVID-19 pandemic ===
The opening rounds of the 2020 championship were heavily affected by the COVID-19 pandemic. Several Grands Prix were cancelled or postponed after the planned opening round in Australia was called off two days before the race was due to take place; prompting the FIA to draft a new calendar. The British Grand Prix was originally intended to be held on 19 July. When the calendar was redrafted following the pandemic the Hungarian Grand Prix and British Grand Prix had swapped dates with Hungary moving to 19 July and Silverstone taking the 2 August date, the originally planned date of the Hungarian race.

Although there had been doubts over whether Silverstone would be able to host Formula One races due to quarantine measures proposed by the British government; Boris Johnson, the Prime Minister, said in a statement that he believed Formula One should be given an exemption. In the end, the British Government did give approval for Formula One to be held at Silverstone. Before the races took place Northamptonshire Police reiterated the importance of fans staying away from Silverstone for public health reasons during the two racing weekends, and warned that strict measures would be in place to stop unauthorised persons from entering the circuit.

The addition to the calendar of the 70th Anniversary Grand Prix on 9 August, also at Silverstone, marked the first time in twenty-seven years the United Kingdom had hosted two Formula One races in the same season. The last season to have two British races in a season prior to this was the 1993 season, when Donington Park hosted the European Grand Prix and Silverstone hosted the British Grand Prix. It was later revealed that Silverstone offered to hold as many as 12 races in total during the season. Both the British Grand Prix and the 70th Anniversary Grand Prix were held behind closed doors.

=== Championship standings before the race ===
After the third round at the 2020 Hungarian Grand Prix, defending champion Lewis Hamilton, on 63 points, led the championship by five points over his teammate Valtteri Bottas, with Max Verstappen a further 25 points behind. Defending Constructors' Champion Mercedes, with 121 points, led the championship from Red Bull, who had 55. McLaren sat 14 points behind Red Bull in third, and were only one point ahead of fourth-placed Racing Point, who had 40 points, while Ferrari sat 5th on 27 points. Williams were the only team without a point, heading into the race.

=== Entrants ===
The initial driver and team race entry list was identical to the season entry list with no additional stand-in drivers for practice. However, this changed following a positive COVID-19 test for Racing Point driver Sergio Pérez who was ruled out of the Grand Prix. He was replaced by Nico Hülkenberg.

=== Tyre choices ===
Pirelli brought the C1, C2, C3 compound tyres for use in the race, the hardest three compounds available. However, the 70th Anniversary Grand Prix, which was also held at Silverstone the following weekend, used the C2, C3 and C4 selection instead. This aimed to not only create strategic differences between the two races, but also to force the teams to fully make use of practice time on the second weekend, instead of relying on data from the previous week. The idea was instituted after the Mercedes team rejected an alternate plan, for a reverse starting grid to be run on the second weekend.

== Practice ==
Red Bull's Max Verstappen set the fastest time of the first practice session on Friday, followed by the Mercedes of Lewis Hamilton and the Racing Point of Lance Stroll. Nico Hülkenberg, in his first practice session on his return to the sport, set the ninth fastest time. During the session, Alfa Romeo's Antonio Giovinazzi spun at turn 13 and scattered gravel and tyre debris onto the track, causing the session to be red-flagged for 12 minutes whilst the track was cleared. He was investigated and later issued a warning by the race stewards for failing to safely return to the pit lane. Sebastian Vettel was unable to complete any timed laps after his Ferrari suffered an intercooler issue early in the session.

Stroll set the fastest time of the second Friday practice session, followed by the Red Bull of Alexander Albon and the Mercedes of Valtteri Bottas. This session was also red-flagged after Albon spun at turn 15 and collided with the barriers. He was taken to the circuit's medical centre but was later declared fit. Vettel was again forced to miss practice time when a pedal issue restricted his running.

Bottas set the fastest time of Saturday morning practice, followed by Hamilton and Verstappen. Albon was forced to miss most of the session with electrical issues, and Vettel continued to suffer brake pedal problems which curtailed his running on Friday.

== Qualifying ==
=== Q1 and Q2 ===
Although there was a 60% chance of rain before qualifying, all three parts would prove to be dry. In Q1 (the first part of qualifying), Nicholas Latifi spun on his last lap, exiting the slow turn 7 (Luffield); his earlier time was only good enough for last place. His Williams teammate George Russell was investigated by the stewards for not slowing down under the consequent yellow flags - he received a five-place grid penalty. In the end, the five drivers eliminated in Q1 were Kevin Magnussen, Antonio Giovinazzi, Kimi Räikkönen, Romain Grosjean, and Latifi - as both Giovinazzi and Raikkonen failed to make it out of Q1, Alfa Romeo remained the only team to not reach Q2 (the second part of qualifying) in 2020.

Two different strategies were used in Q2, with both the Mercedes, Red Bulls, Racing Points and one of the Ferraris – that of Charles Leclerc – trying to get into Q3 (the third part of qualifying) on the more race-suitable medium compound tyre, and the other teams using the soft compound due to the top ten qualifiers having to start on the tyre used in Q2. Early on in the session, world championship leader Lewis Hamilton spun at turn 7; red flags were soon waved, since Hamilton had brought gravel back onto the track with him. After the session resumed, Hamilton and his Mercedes teammate Valtteri Bottas set times a second clear of the rest of the field. Not all those using the medium tyres succeeded in reaching Q3 - Alexander Albon of Red Bull and Racing Point's replacement driver Nico Hülkenberg both failed to do so. Lance Stroll in 10th and Pierre Gasly in 11th set the same time, but since Stroll set it first, the latter in his AlphaTauri was consigned to going out in Q2. At the end of the session, the drivers eliminated were Gasly, Albon, Hulkenberg, Daniil Kvyat, and Russell.

=== Q3 ===
As the cars were being sent out, there was an incident in the pitlane between Leclerc, Stroll, and Daniel Ricciardo, with Stroll complaining that Ferrari had released their driver in an unsafe manner - the stewards, after investigating the matter, decided no further action was necessary. In the first set of laps, Hamilton set the fastest lap time with a 1:24.616, with his teammate 0.15 seconds adrift. Hamilton then improved this time a few minutes later, recording a 1:24:303 to secure pole position, and Bottas achieved second place, 0.3 seconds back. (Note that it is a fastest lap time, but not an official lap record, which can only be set during a race). Max Verstappen, one of the last to cross the line, was third fastest, over a second behind pole position. The rest of the top 10 were: Leclerc, Lando Norris, Stroll, Carlos Sainz Jr., Ricciardo, Esteban Ocon, and Sebastian Vettel.

The pole position was Hamilton's 91st overall, and his seventh around the Silverstone circuit.

=== Qualifying classification ===
Pos.	No.	Driver	Constructor	Qualifying times			Final grid
Pos.	No.	Driver	Constructor	Q1	Q2	Q3	Final grid
1	44	(United Kingdom) Lewis Hamilton	Mercedes	1:25.900	1:25.347	1:24.303	1
2	77	(Finland) Valtteri Bottas	Mercedes	1:25.801	1:25.015	1:24.616	2
3	33	(Netherlands) Max Verstappen	Red Bull Racing-Honda	1:26.115	1:26.144	1:25.325	3
4	16	(Monaco) Charles Leclerc	Ferrari	1:26.550	1:26.203	1:25.427	4
5	4	(United Kingdom) Lando Norris	McLaren-Renault	1:26.855	1:26.420	1:25.782	5
6	18	(Canada) Lance Stroll	Racing Point-BWT Mercedes	1:26.243	1:26.501	1:25.839	6
7	55	(Spain) Carlos Sainz Jr.	McLaren-Renault	1:26.715	1:26.149	1:25.965	7
8	3	(Australia) Daniel Ricciardo	Renault	1:26.677	1:26.339	1:26.009	8
9	31	(France) Esteban Ocon	Renault	1:26.396	1:26.252	1:26.209	9
10	5	(Germany) Sebastian Vettel	Ferrari	1:26.469	1:26.455	1:26.339	10
11	10	(France) Pierre Gasly	AlphaTauri-Honda	1:26.343	1:26.501	N/A	11
12	23	(Thailand) Alexander Albon	Red Bull Racing-Honda	1:26.565	1:26.545	N/A	12
13	27	(Germany) Nico Hülkenberg	Racing Point-BWT Mercedes	1:26.327	1:26.566	N/A	13
14	26	(Russia) Daniil Kvyat	AlphaTauri-Honda	1:26.774	1:26.744	N/A	19^{1}
15	63	(United Kingdom) George Russell	Williams-Mercedes	1:26.732	1:27.092	N/A	20^{2}
16	20	(Denmark) Kevin Magnussen	Haas-Ferrari	1:27.158	N/A	N/A	14
17	99	(Italy) Antonio Giovinazzi	Alfa Romeo Racing-Ferrari	1:27.164	N/A	N/A	15
18	7	(Finland) Kimi Räikkönen	Alfa Romeo Racing-Ferrari	1:27.366	N/A	N/A	16
19	8	(France) Romain Grosjean	Haas-Ferrari	1:27.643	N/A	N/A	17
20	6	(Canada) Nicholas Latifi	Williams-Mercedes	1:27.705	N/A	N/A	18
107% time: 1:31.807

Notes

- ^1 – Daniil Kvyat received a five-place grid penalty for an unscheduled gearbox change.
- ^2 – George Russell received a five-place grid penalty for failing to slow for double yellow flags.

== Race ==
=== Pre-race ceremonies ===
A 'fight against racism' ceremony was held on the track before the race. All 20 of the drivers were out in formation directly in front of the grid, all displaying anti-racism messages on their t-shirts, and with some taking the knee and others standing, as video messages of their support for the anti-racism message were played.

Following the singing of the national anthem ("God Save The Queen"), which was performed by the UK's foremost national anthem soprano, Emily Haig, there was a flyover by a Spitfire with the message "Thank you NHS" painted on the underside of its wings, and accompanied by applause from those present, in recognition of the work done by the UK's public health services in the fight against the COVID-19 epidemic.

=== Race report ===
==== Pre-race ====
The Racing Point team was unable to start Nico Hülkenberg’s power unit in the garage, forcing him out of the race prior to the formation lap. This was determined to have been caused by a clutch bolt having sheared off in the drivetrain and, where the bolt jammed, the engine was prevented from turning over.

==== Early laps ====
Lewis Hamilton led from pole position at the race start. On the opening lap, Carlos Sainz Jr. and Daniel Ricciardo, starting seventh and eighth respectively, both made up two places by passing Lando Norris and Lance Stroll. 12th-placed Kevin Magnussen hit a kerb at the inside of turn 17, running wide. Alexander Albon then attempted to overtake Magnussen at turn 18, the two cars collided and Magnussen was sent through the gravel and into the barriers. He was uninjured and the safety car was deployed in order to recover his Haas. Albon was later issued a five-second time penalty after the race stewards deemed him responsible for the collision.

Racing resumed on lap six. At the end of the lap, Albon became the first driver to make a pit stop to change from medium to hard-compound tyres. On lap 12, 12th-placed Daniil Kvyat spun at turn 10 as a result of a right-rear tyre failure and crashed heavily into the barriers on the outside of turn 11. Kvyat walked away from the accident and the safety car was deployed whilst his car was recovered. All drivers except Albon and Romain Grosjean made pit stops during the safety car period, allowing Grosjean to jump to fifth place. The order of the top 10 was now Hamilton, Valtteri Bottas, Max Verstappen, Charles Leclerc, Grosjean, Sainz, Ricciardo, Norris, Stroll and Sebastian Vettel, who had passed Esteban Ocon in the pits after the Renault suffered a slow pit stop.

==== Mid-race ====
The second safety car period ended on lap 19. Shortly after the restart, Vettel fell back behind Ocon, and Norris passed Ricciardo for seventh place. Grosjean was soon overtaken by both McLarens, and was shown the black-and-white flag for unsportsmanlike conduct after being judged to have defended too aggressively from Sainz. 14th-placed Albon made a second pit stop on lap 30, the first driver to do so, serving his time penalty and changing to soft-compound tyres. Antonio Giovinazzi was issued a five-second time penalty on lap 36 for speeding under safety car conditions. On the same lap, Grosjean fell to ninth place having been passed by Ricciardo and Stroll. He was again investigated for moving too aggressively whilst defending from Ricciardo, but no action was taken. He made his first pit stop at the end of the lap, falling to the back of the field. On lap 38, Vettel dropped out of the points positions after being passed for 10th place by Pierre Gasly. Ocon passed Stroll for eighth place on lap 46.

==== Closing laps ====
In the closing laps Bottas, who had been running closely behind teammate and race leader Hamilton for the entire race, began to fall back, complaining of poor visibility due to vibrations. Sainz also reported a similar issue over the radio. Kimi Räikkönen, last of the running cars in 17th place, suffered a front wing failure on lap 48 and returned to the pits for a replacement. On the following lap, Gasly passed Stroll for ninth place and Ricciardo overtook Norris for sixth. With three laps to go, Bottas' front-left tyre delaminated. After passing Bottas for second place, Verstappen made use of the gap to Leclerc in third and pitted for fresh tyres to safeguard against suffering a tyre failure himself and in an attempt to claim the fastest lap of the race. This time, 1:27.097, still stands as the lap record as of 2025 (even though Hamilton was quicker in Q3). Bottas slowly completed his lap to return to the pits, changed tyres and emerged in 12th place.

With two laps to go, Albon, who had worked his way up from the back of the field and was promoted to 10th place by Bottas' pit stop, passed Stroll for ninth place. At the same time, fourth-placed Sainz suffered a front-left tyre failure. He returned to the pits and eventually fell to 14th place by the finish line. After Bottas' puncture, race leader Hamilton was warned over the radio to preserve his tyres. However this proved to be too late as, at turn eight on the final lap, Hamilton became the third driver to suffer a front-left failure. At this point, Hamilton had gained a lead of over 30 seconds after Verstappen's precautionary pit stop, although this gap rapidly fell as Hamilton slowly completed the lap.

Verstappen could only close the gap to six seconds by the finish line, and Hamilton took the chequered flag to claim his third consecutive victory of the season, 87th career win and his seventh at the British Grand Prix. Verstappen finished second and succeeded in claiming the fastest lap, with Leclerc completing the podium. Ricciardo and Norris finished fourth and fifth, with Ocon claiming his best finish since the 2018 Italian Grand Prix in sixth. Gasly, Albon, Stroll and Vettel rounded out the points positions.

==== Post-race ====
On his lap 12 accident, Kvyat claimed that he was "very, very distract[ed]" as issues with his car required him to change settings on his steering wheel immediately prior to the crash. AlphaTauri team principal Franz Tost suggested that Kvyat's accident may have been down to a tyre puncture, while Pirelli later confirmed a right-rear tyre failure did cause the crash though not through a puncture by the wheel rim overheating causing the tyre to detach entirely. Red Bull defended their decision to pit Verstappen in the closing laps, raising the possibility that he could have suffered the same tyre failure as the Mercedes drivers.

The tyre failures near the end of the race were investigated by Pirelli (the tyre supplier) and the FIA (the governing body) after the race. The company stated that the tyre failures were generated by two different causes: firstly, the 'extremely long' stints the cars were running on the demanding Silverstone circuit; and secondly, the increased pace of the 2020 cars which maximised the forces on the tyres, with the most stress on the front-left.

Renault also protested the legality of the Racing Point RP20's brake ducts for a third race in succession. The protest was upheld with Racing Point being reprimanded but the team and drivers allowed to keep their results.

=== Race classification ===
Pos.	No.	Driver	Constructor	Laps	Time/Retired	Grid	Points
1	44	(United Kingdom) Lewis Hamilton	Mercedes	52	1:28:01.283	1	25
2	33	(Netherlands) Max Verstappen	Red Bull Racing-Honda	52	+5.856	3	19^{3}
3	16	(Monaco) Charles Leclerc	Ferrari	52	+18.474	4	15
4	3	(Australia) Daniel Ricciardo	Renault	52	+19.650	8	12
5	4	(United Kingdom) Lando Norris	McLaren-Renault	52	+22.277	5	10
6	31	(France) Esteban Ocon	Renault	52	+26.937	9	8
7	10	(France) Pierre Gasly	AlphaTauri-Honda	52	+31.188	11	6
8	23	(Thailand) Alexander Albon	Red Bull Racing-Honda	52	+32.670	12	4
9	18	(Canada) Lance Stroll	Racing Point-BWT Mercedes	52	+37.311	6	2
10	5	(Germany) Sebastian Vettel	Ferrari	52	+41.857	10	1
11	77	(Finland) Valtteri Bottas	Mercedes	52	+42.167	2	
12	63	(United Kingdom) George Russell	Williams-Mercedes	52	+52.004	20	
13	55	(Spain) Carlos Sainz Jr.	McLaren-Renault	52	+53.370	7	
14	99	(Italy) Antonio Giovinazzi	Alfa Romeo Racing-Ferrari	52	+54.205^{4}	15	
15	6	(Canada) Nicholas Latifi	Williams-Mercedes	52	+54.549	18	
16	8	(France) Romain Grosjean	Haas-Ferrari	52	+55.050	17	
17	7	(Finland) Kimi Räikkönen	Alfa Romeo Racing-Ferrari	51	+1 lap	16	
Ret	26	(Russia) Daniil Kvyat	AlphaTauri-Honda	11	Puncture/Accident	19	
Ret	20	(Denmark) Kevin Magnussen	Haas-Ferrari	1	Collision	14	
DNS	27	(Germany) Nico Hülkenberg	Racing Point-BWT Mercedes	0	Clutch	—^{5}	
Fastest lap: (Netherlands) Max Verstappen (Red Bull Racing-Honda) – 1:27.097 (lap 52)

Notes

- ^3 – Includes one point for fastest lap.
- ^4 – Antonio Giovinazzi finished 12th on the track, but received a five-second time penalty for speeding under safety car conditions.
- ^5 – Nico Hülkenberg qualified 13th, but his place on the grid was left vacant as he did not start the race.

== Championship standings after the race ==
Drivers' Championship standings

	Pos.	Driver	Points
	1	(United Kingdom) Lewis Hamilton	88
	2	(Finland) Valtteri Bottas	58
	3	(Netherlands) Max Verstappen	52
	4	(United Kingdom) Lando Norris	36
1	5	(Monaco) Charles Leclerc	33

Constructors' Championship standings

	Pos.	Constructor	Points
	1	(Germany) Mercedes	146
	2	(Austria) Red Bull Racing-Honda	78
	3	(United Kingdom) McLaren-Renault	51
1	4	(Italy) Ferrari	43
1	5	(United Kingdom) Racing Point-BWT Mercedes	42

- Note: Only the top five positions are included for both sets of standings, which are accurate as of final declaration of results.

== See also ==
- 2020 Silverstone Formula 2 round
- 2020 Silverstone Formula 3 round

== Notes ==
Previous race: 2020 Hungarian Grand Prix	FIA Formula One World Championship; 2020 season	Next race: 70th Anniversary Grand Prix
Previous race: 2019 British Grand Prix	British Grand Prix	Next race: 2021 British Grand Prix
