= 2020 Hungarian Grand Prix =

Formula One race

Race 3 of 17 (Note: The outbreak of the COVID-19 pandemic saw several Grands Prix cancelled or rescheduled. The revised calendar consisted of seventeen races.) in the 2020 Formula One World Championship
| ← Previous race | Next race → |
- Layout of the Hungaroring

Race details
- Date: 19 July 2020
- Official name: Formula 1 Aramco Magyar Nagydíj 2020
- Location: Hungaroring; Mogyoród, Hungary
- Course: Permanent racing facility
- Course length: 4.381 km (2.722 miles)
- Distance: 70 laps, 306.630 km (190.531 miles)
- Weather: Wet at start, partly cloudy
- Attendance: 0 (Note: The Grand Prix was held behind closed doors due to the COVID-19 pandemic in Hungary.)

Pole position
| Driver | (United Kingdom) Lewis Hamilton | Mercedes |
- Time: 1:13.447

Fastest lap
| Driver | (United Kingdom) Lewis Hamilton | Mercedes |
- Time: 1:16.627 on lap 70 (lap record)

Podium
| First | (United Kingdom) Lewis Hamilton | Mercedes |
| Second | (Netherlands) Max Verstappen | Red Bull Racing-Honda |
| Third | (Finland) Valtteri Bottas | Mercedes |

The 2020 Hungarian Grand Prix (officially known as the Formula 1 Aramco Magyar Nagydíj 2020) was a Formula One motor race held on 19 July 2020 at the Hungaroring in Mogyoród, Hungary. The race was the third round of the 2020 Formula One World Championship, the 36th running of the Hungarian Grand Prix and the 35th time the race had been run as a World Championship event since the inaugural season in 1950. Lewis Hamilton was the defending race winner and the eventual winner of this Grand Prix, Hamilton's second successive win of the 2020 season and his eighth at the Hungaroring.

== Background ==
=== Impact of the COVID-19 pandemic ===
On the provisional 2020 calendar, published in 2019, the Hungarian Grand Prix was pencilled in for 2 August. However, due to the COVID-19 pandemic, the FIA reshuffled the calendar. The Hungarian Grand Prix was moved to 19 July swapping places with the British Grand Prix.

Prior to the race, concerns were raised regarding Hungary's strict coronavirus restrictions, which include the threat of fines and imprisonment for personnel who do not comply. Further to this Scuderia Ferrari team principal Mattia Binotto revealed he had spoken about the need to follow the FIA's own COVID-19 safety protocols to both of his drivers after both were found to have breached the rules on separate occasions during the first two race weekends in Austria with the threat of sporting sanctions (including being removed from the event entry list) by race stewards a possibility for further breaches. Binotto stated he expects the drivers to pay closer attention to these rules going forward.

=== Championship standings before the race ===
After the second round, the Styrian Grand Prix, Valtteri Bottas led the championship by 6 points from his teammate and defending champion Lewis Hamilton, with Lando Norris of McLaren a further 11 points behind in third place. In the Constructors' Championship, defending champions Mercedes led the championship with 80 points, McLaren was in second with 39 points, with Red Bull Racing in third with 27 points. Racing Point was 4th with 22 points, with Scuderia Ferrari in 5th with 19 points following a double retirement for the team at the Styrian Grand Prix.

=== Entrants ===
The drivers and teams were the same as the season entry list with no additional stand-in drivers for the race. Robert Kubica took part in the first practice session for Alfa Romeo Racing in place of Kimi Räikkönen.

=== Tyre choices ===
The Hungarian Grand Prix used the C2, C3 and C4 combination of tyres, the second, third, and fourth hardest compounds available. The same compound selection as was used in the first two races of the season at the Red Bull Ring.

== Practice ==
The first practice session was topped by Lewis Hamilton and then Valtteri Bottas, both of Mercedes, followed by Sergio Pérez and then Lance Stroll, both of Racing Point. Pierre Gasly was unable to set a lap time due to issues with his power unit.

Second practice was run in the wet and ended with Sebastian Vettel fastest for Ferrari ahead of Bottas and McLaren's Carlos Sainz Jr., in a session where only 13 drivers set a time. The third practice session ended with Bottas fastest ahead of Hamilton and Pérez.

== Qualifying ==
The start of qualifying was marked by most of the cars immediately exiting the pit lane, as there was a chance of rain (as it happened, the rain was very light, and there was no need for non-slick tyres). Characteristically, the grip on the Hungaroring circuit increased dramatically over the session, especially in Q1. The five drivers knocked out in the session were Kevin Magnussen, Daniil Kvyat, Romain Grosjean, Antonio Giovinazzi and Kimi Raikkonen - the latter two both driving for Alfa Romeo and achieving the worst qualifying results this season for the team by locking out the back row of the grid with Giovianzzi qualifying 19th and Raikkonen 20th and last. The former world champion Raikkonen was also knocked out in Q1 for the fourth consecutive race, the first time in his career this had happened. Conversely, both Williams drivers (George Russell and Nicholas Latifi) managed to make it out of Q1, the first time the team had achieved this since the 2018 Italian Grand Prix.

In Q2, the five drivers knocked out were Daniel Ricciardo, Russell, Alexander Albon, Esteban Ocon and Latifi - for the latter, the highest grid placement at that time in his career. Albon, in his Red Bull Racing car, struggled with handling difficulties, and failed to reach Q3. Although Pierre Gasly's AlphaTauri ran out of power near the end of the session, his time set earlier would be enough to reach Q3, where he would not complete a flying lap.

Lewis Hamilton took pole by over one-tenth of a second from his Mercedes teammate Valtteri Bottas, achieving the team's first front-row lockout of the season. Racing Point managed to lock out the second row of the grid for the first time since their debut at the 2018 Belgian Grand Prix; the team was delighted with third for Lance Stroll and fourth for Sergio Pérez. Next came the two Ferraris of Sebastian Vettel and Charles Leclerc, with the team's highest qualifying result of the season, and continuing Vettel's record of qualifying fifth or higher at the circuit every year since 2008. Like his teammate, Max Verstappen struggled in his Red Bull, and having been forecast prior to the race to be a possible contender for the win, only managed seventh, ahead of Lando Norris and Carlos Sainz Jr, both driving for McLaren with Gasly in tenth.

=== Qualifying classification ===
| Pos. | No. | Driver | Constructor | Qualifying times | | | Final grid |
| Pos. | No. | Driver | Constructor | Q1 | Q2 | Q3 | Final grid |
|---|---|---|---|---|---|---|---|
| 1 | 44 | (United Kingdom) Lewis Hamilton | Mercedes | 1:14.907 | 1:14.261 | 1:13.447 | 1 |
| 2 | 77 | (Finland) Valtteri Bottas | Mercedes | 1:15.474 | 1:14.530 | 1:13.554 | 2 |
| 3 | 18 | (Canada) Lance Stroll | Racing Point-BWT Mercedes | 1:14.895 | 1:15.176 | 1:14.377 | 3 |
| 4 | 11 | (Mexico) Sergio Pérez | Racing Point-BWT Mercedes | 1:14.681 | 1:15.394 | 1:14.545 | 4 |
| 5 | 5 | (Germany) Sebastian Vettel | Ferrari | 1:15.455 | 1:15.131 | 1:14.774 | 5 |
| 6 | 16 | (Monaco) Charles Leclerc | Ferrari | 1:15.793 | 1:15.006 | 1:14.817 | 6 |
| 7 | 33 | (Netherlands) Max Verstappen | Red Bull Racing-Honda | 1:15.495 | 1:14.976 | 1:14.849 | 7 |
| 8 | 4 | (United Kingdom) Lando Norris | McLaren-Renault | 1:15.444 | 1:15.085 | 1:14.966 | 8 |
| 9 | 55 | (Spain) Carlos Sainz Jr. | McLaren-Renault | 1:15.281 | 1:15.267 | 1:15.027 | 9 |
| 10 | 10 | (France) Pierre Gasly | AlphaTauri-Honda | 1:15.767 | 1:15.508 | No time | 10 |
| 11 | 3 | (Australia) Daniel Ricciardo | Renault | 1:15.848 | 1:15.661 | N/A | 11 |
| 12 | 63 | (United Kingdom) George Russell | Williams-Mercedes | 1:15.585 | 1:15.698 | N/A | 12 |
| 13 | 23 | (Thailand) Alexander Albon | Red Bull Racing-Honda | 1:15.722 | 1:15.715 | N/A | 13 |
| 14 | 31 | (France) Esteban Ocon | Renault | 1:15.719 | 1:15.742 | N/A | 14 |
| 15 | 6 | (Canada) Nicholas Latifi | Williams-Mercedes | 1:16.105 | 1:16.544 | N/A | 15 |
| 16 | 20 | (Denmark) Kevin Magnussen | Haas-Ferrari | 1:16.152 | N/A | N/A | 16 |
| 17 | 26 | (Russia) Daniil Kvyat | AlphaTauri-Honda | 1:16.204 | N/A | N/A | 17 |
| 18 | 8 | (France) Romain Grosjean | Haas-Ferrari | 1:16.407 | N/A | N/A | 18 |
| 19 | 99 | (Italy) Antonio Giovinazzi | Alfa Romeo Racing-Ferrari | 1:16.506 | N/A | N/A | 19 |
| 20 | 7 | (Finland) Kimi Räikkönen | Alfa Romeo Racing-Ferrari | 1:16.614 | N/A | N/A | 20 |
107% time: 1:19.908

== Race ==
=== Pre-race ===
Max Verstappen crashed on the way to the grid, damaging his front wing and suspension. His car was repaired prior to the formation lap and he started from his original grid position.

At the start of the formation lap all drivers but one were on the intermediate tyres with Magnussen on full wets. During the formation lap, both Haas cars entered the pits and swapped from intermediate and wet tyres to slicks.

The race started in damp conditions with further rain forecast during the race.

=== Race report ===
At the start of the race, Valtteri Bottas, starting second in his Mercedes, moved slightly before all five lights went out; Bottas said afterwards that he had reacted to lights on his steering wheel rather than the actual lights. As the movement was so small, the sensors that determine a jumped start did not pick it up, and thus Bottas was not penalised by the stewards; however, he had damaged his own launch and consequently lost four places on the first lap. With the track drying swiftly, drivers quickly came into the pits for slick tyres - as both Haas cars were already on the medium compound, they did not have to pit, and were in third and fourth by lap 8. By lap 9, polesitter Lewis Hamilton had already gained seven seconds on second placed Verstappen. Having already spun at turn one on lap 5, Nicholas Latifi of Williams received a five-second time penalty for an unsafe release in the pits, where he almost collided with the McLaren of Carlos Sainz Jr.

On laps 9 and 10, Bottas duelled with Charles Leclerc's Ferrari for sixth place, eventually getting past at turn one, with Leclerc complaining about his soft compound tyres. On lap 13, Sebastian Vettel in the other Ferrari lost eighth place to Alexander Albon of Red Bull, after running wide at Turn 12. Pierre Gasly in his AlphaTauri retired on lap 15, due to an engine problem that had affected him throughout the weekend. By lap 25, the top 10 ran thus: Hamilton, Verstappen, Lance Stroll, Bottas, Kevin Magnussen, Romain Grosjean, Albon, Vettel, Sergio Pérez, and Daniel Ricciardo.

On lap 30, Ferrari, betting on there being no rain, had Vettel pit for hard tyres. This became the view of all the teams in the next few laps, and all of the drivers pitted for new slick tyres. Three laps later, Leclerc was involved in another close fight, this time with Lando Norris for 13th. After Hamilton's pit stop on lap 40, his lead over Verstappen stood at over 20 seconds. This was enough time for him to pit near the end of the race onto soft tyres, so he could set the fastest lap of the race, a 1:16:627. In the final few laps, Albon overtook Vettel for fifth place, and Sainz overtook the other Ferrari of Leclerc for tenth (Sainz would later be promoted to ninth following a penalty for Magnussen). On the final lap, Bottas had a chance to overtake Verstappen for second place; he was not, however, able to get past.

=== Post-race ===
Kevin Magnussen and Romain Grosjean each received a ten-second penalty for a breach of rules regarding formation lap radio messages instructing the drivers to pit and change tyres, which in turn contravened the rule that the driver "must drive the car alone and unaided". The penalty dropped Magnussen from ninth to tenth, and Grosjean from fifteenth to sixteenth. Alexander Albon was also investigated by the stewards as it was believed that his team was illegally drying the track around his grid spot prior to the race but was not punished as no evidence for the claims was found. Renault protested the results of the Racing Point team over the legality of their car (Racing Point RP20) for the second successive race. The FIA investigation into the matter continued.

=== Race classification ===
| Pos. | No. | Driver | Constructor | Laps | Time/Retired | Start | Points |
|---|---|---|---|---|---|---|---|
| 1 | 44 | (United Kingdom) Lewis Hamilton | Mercedes | 70 | 1:36:12.473 | 1 | 26^{1} |
| 2 | 33 | (Netherlands) Max Verstappen | Red Bull Racing-Honda | 70 | +8.702 | 7 | 18 |
| 3 | 77 | (Finland) Valtteri Bottas | Mercedes | 70 | +9.452 | 2 | 15 |
| 4 | 18 | (Canada) Lance Stroll | Racing Point-BWT Mercedes | 70 | +57.579 | 3 | 12 |
| 5 | 23 | (Thailand) Alexander Albon | Red Bull Racing-Honda | 70 | +1:18.316 | 13 | 10 |
| 6 | 5 | (Germany) Sebastian Vettel | Ferrari | 69 | +1 lap | 5 | 8 |
| 7 | 11 | (Mexico) Sergio Pérez | Racing Point-BWT Mercedes | 69 | +1 lap | 4 | 6 |
| 8 | 3 | (Australia) Daniel Ricciardo | Renault | 69 | +1 lap | 11 | 4 |
| 9 | 55 | (Spain) Carlos Sainz Jr. | McLaren-Renault | 69 | +1 lap | 9 | 2 |
| 10 | 20 | (Denmark) Kevin Magnussen | Haas-Ferrari | 69 | +1 lap^{2} | PL^{2} | 1 |
| 11 | 16 | (Monaco) Charles Leclerc | Ferrari | 69 | +1 lap | 6 | |
| 12 | 26 | (Russia) Daniil Kvyat | AlphaTauri-Honda | 69 | +1 lap | 17 | |
| 13 | 4 | (United Kingdom) Lando Norris | McLaren-Renault | 69 | +1 lap | 8 | |
| 14 | 31 | (France) Esteban Ocon | Renault | 69 | +1 lap | 14 | |
| 15 | 7 | (Finland) Kimi Räikkönen | Alfa Romeo Racing-Ferrari | 69 | +1 lap | 20 | |
| 16 | 8 | (France) Romain Grosjean | Haas-Ferrari | 69 | +1 lap^{3} | PL^{3} | |
| 17 | 99 | (Italy) Antonio Giovinazzi | Alfa Romeo Racing-Ferrari | 69 | +1 lap | 19 | |
| 18 | 63 | (United Kingdom) George Russell | Williams-Mercedes | 69 | +1 lap | 12 | |
| 19 | 6 | (Canada) Nicholas Latifi | Williams-Mercedes | 65 | +5 laps | 15 | |
| Ret | 10 | (France) Pierre Gasly | AlphaTauri-Honda | 15 | Gearbox | 10 | |
Fastest lap: (United Kingdom) Lewis Hamilton (Mercedes) – 1:16.627 (lap 70)

Notes

- ^1 – Includes one point for fastest lap.
- ^2 – Kevin Magnussen qualified 16th, but his place on the grid was left vacant as he came into the pits during the formation lap. He originally finished 9th, but received a ten-second time penalty for breaching rules regarding radio communications on the formation lap.
- ^3 – Romain Grosjean qualified 18th, but his place on the grid was left vacant as he came into the pits during the formation lap. He originally finished 15th, but received a ten-second time penalty for breaching rules regarding radio communications on the formation lap.

== Championship standings after the race ==
Drivers' Championship standings

| | Pos. | Driver | Points |
|---|---|---|---|
| 1 | 1 | (United Kingdom) Lewis Hamilton | 63 |
| 1 | 2 | (Finland) Valtteri Bottas | 58 |
| 3 | 3 | (Netherlands) Max Verstappen | 33 |
| 1 | 4 | (United Kingdom) Lando Norris | 26 |
| 3 | 5 | (Thailand) Alexander Albon | 22 |

Constructors' Championship standings

| | Pos. | Constructor | Points |
|---|---|---|---|
| | 1 | (Germany) Mercedes | 121 |
| 1 | 2 | (Austria) Red Bull Racing-Honda | 55 |
| 1 | 3 | (United Kingdom) McLaren-Renault | 41 |
| | 4 | (United Kingdom) Racing Point-BWT Mercedes | 40 |
| | 5 | (Italy) Ferrari | 27 |

- Note: Only the top five positions are included for both sets of standings, which are accurate as of final declaration of results.

== See also ==
- 2020 Budapest Formula 2 round
- 2020 Budapest Formula 3 round

== Notes ==
| Previous race: 2020 Styrian Grand Prix | FIA Formula One World Championship; 2020 season | Next race: 2020 British Grand Prix |
| Previous race: 2019 Hungarian Grand Prix | Hungarian Grand Prix | Next race: 2021 Hungarian Grand Prix |
