= 2020 Belgian Grand Prix =

Race 7 of 17 (Note: The outbreak of the COVID-19 pandemic saw several Grands Prix cancelled or rescheduled. The revised calendar consisted of seventeen races.) in the 2020 Formula One World Championship
← Previous race	Next race →
- Layout of the Spa-Francorchamps circuit

Race details
- Date: 30 August 2020
- Official name: Formula 1 Rolex Belgian Grand Prix 2020
- Location: Circuit de Spa-Francorchamps, Stavelot, Belgium
- Course: Permanent racing facility
- Course length: 7.004 km (4.352 miles)
- Distance: 44 laps, 308.052 km (191.415 miles)
- Weather: Partly cloudy
- Attendance: 0 (Note: The Grand Prix was held behind closed doors due to the COVID-19 pandemic in Belgium.)

Pole position
Driver	(United Kingdom) Lewis Hamilton	Mercedes
- Time: 1:41.252

Fastest lap
Driver	(Australia) Daniel Ricciardo	Renault
- Time: 1:47.483 on lap 44

Podium
First	(United Kingdom) Lewis Hamilton	Mercedes
Second	(Finland) Valtteri Bottas	Mercedes
Third	(Netherlands) Max Verstappen	Red Bull Racing-Honda

The 2020 Belgian Grand Prix (officially known as the Formula 1 Rolex Belgian Grand Prix 2020) was a Formula One motor race held on 30 August 2020 at the Circuit de Spa-Francorchamps in Stavelot, Belgium. The race was the seventh round in the 2020 Formula One World Championship.

== Background ==
A minute of silence was held before the race to mark the one year anniversary of Anthoine Hubert's death. Pierre Gasly, one of Hubert's closest friends wore a tribute helmet for Hubert and all teams and drivers sported a star sticker on their chassis and helmets in tribute to Hubert.

=== Impact of the COVID-19 pandemic ===
The opening rounds of the 2020 championship were heavily affected by the COVID-19 pandemic. Several Grands Prix were cancelled or postponed after the planned opening round in Australia was called off two days before the race was due to take place, prompting the FIA to draft a new calendar. However, the Belgian Grand Prix was not impacted by this change and kept its original date.

In April 2020, the Belgian government extended a ban on mass gatherings until 31 August 2020 in a bid to control the spread of the COVID-19 pandemic. However, the race later received permission to be held behind closed doors.

=== Entrants ===
The drivers and teams were the same as those on the season entry list with no additional stand-in drivers for either the race or practice.

=== Tyres ===
Pirelli brought forward the C2, C3 and C4 tyres for the race weekend, the second, third, and fourth hardest tyre compounds available.

== Practice ==
The first practice session took place without major incident and ended with Valtteri Bottas fastest for Mercedes ahead of teammate Lewis Hamilton and Red Bull driver Max Verstappen. Haas drivers Kevin Magnussen and Romain Grosjean and Alfa Romeo’s Antonio Giovinazzi were all unable to set a lap due to power unit issues for the Haas cars and unexplained issues for Giovinazzi's Alfa car. In the second practice session, Max Verstappen was fastest for Red Bull, ahead of Renault’s Daniel Ricciardo and Hamilton in the Mercedes. Daniel Ricciardo suffered a hydraulics issue on the Kemmel straight shortly after setting the second fastest time resulting in a virtual safety car. A short red flag period followed soon due to an advertising billboard coming loose and falling on the track at turn 1. In the third and final practice session, Hamilton was fastest followed by Esteban Ocon for Renault and Lando Norris for McLaren. Ferrari, who had won the previous Belgian Grand Prix struggled in third practice with Charles Leclerc 17th and Sebastian Vettel last.

== Qualifying ==
Lewis Hamilton took pole, 0.511 seconds ahead of teammate Valtteri Bottas in Q3 (the third part of qualifying) with Red Bull’s Max Verstappen only 0.015 seconds behind Bottas in third. Hamilton dedicated his pole position to Chadwick Boseman, who had died in the days preceding the race. Daniel Ricciardo finished fourth for Renault with Alexander Albon fifth and Esteban Ocon sixth. The rest of the top 10 were Carlos Sainz Jr. for McLaren, the Racing Point duo of Sergio Pérez and Lance Stroll followed by Lando Norris in the other McLaren. The AlphaTauri’s of Daniil Kvyat and Pierre Gasly were 11th and 12th, followed by the Ferrari’s of Charles Leclerc and Sebastian Vettel. This was the first time since the 2014 British Grand Prix that Ferrari took no part in Q3. George Russell impressed in 15th, getting through to Q2 (the second part of qualifying) for the fifth time this season for Williams. Out in Q1 (the first part of qualifying) were both Alfa Romeos, both Haas drivers and the Williams of Nicholas Latifi.

=== Qualifying classification ===
Pos.	No.	Driver	Constructor	Qualifying times			Final grid
Pos.	No.	Driver	Constructor	Q1	Q2	Q3	Final grid
1	44	(United Kingdom) Lewis Hamilton	Mercedes	1:42.323	1:42.014	1:41.252	1
2	77	(Finland) Valtteri Bottas	Mercedes	1:42.534	1:42.126	1:41.763	2
3	33	(Netherlands) Max Verstappen	Red Bull Racing-Honda	1:43.197	1:42.473	1:41.778	3
4	3	(Australia) Daniel Ricciardo	Renault	1:43.309	1:42.487	1:42.061	4
5	23	(Thailand) Alexander Albon	Red Bull Racing-Honda	1:43.418	1:42.193	1:42.264	5
6	31	(France) Esteban Ocon	Renault	1:43.505	1:42.534	1:42.396	6
7	55	(Spain) Carlos Sainz Jr.	McLaren-Renault	1:43.322	1:42.478	1:42.438	7
8	11	(Mexico) Sergio Pérez	Racing Point-BWT Mercedes	1:43.349	1:42.670	1:42.532	8
9	18	(Canada) Lance Stroll	Racing Point-BWT Mercedes	1:43.265	1:42.491	1:42.603	9
10	4	(United Kingdom) Lando Norris	McLaren-Renault	1:43.514	1:42.722	1:42.657	10
11	26	(Russia) Daniil Kvyat	AlphaTauri-Honda	1:43.267	1:42.730	N/A	11
12	10	(France) Pierre Gasly	AlphaTauri-Honda	1:43.262	1:42.745	N/A	12
13	16	(Monaco) Charles Leclerc	Ferrari	1:43.656	1:42.996	N/A	13
14	5	(Germany) Sebastian Vettel	Ferrari	1:43.567	1:43.261	N/A	14
15	63	(United Kingdom) George Russell	Williams-Mercedes	1:43.630	1:43.468	N/A	15
16	7	(Finland) Kimi Räikkönen	Alfa Romeo Racing-Ferrari	1:43.743	N/A	N/A	16
17	8	(France) Romain Grosjean	Haas-Ferrari	1:43.838	N/A	N/A	17
18	99	(Italy) Antonio Giovinazzi	Alfa Romeo Racing-Ferrari	1:43.950	N/A	N/A	18
19	6	(Canada) Nicholas Latifi	Williams-Mercedes	1:44.138	N/A	N/A	19
20	20	(Denmark) Kevin Magnussen	Haas-Ferrari	1:44.314	N/A	N/A	20
107% time: 1:49.485

== Race ==
McLaren’s Carlos Sainz Jr. suffered a power unit issue which also damaged his exhaust, meaning he was unable to start the race. On lap 10, Alfa Romeo's Antonio Giovinazzi lost control of his car coming out of turn 14 and crashed into the wall. One of his wheels detached from the car which subsequently hit the front right suspension of George Russell's Williams forcing both drivers to retire from the race.

This caused significant debris resulting in a safety car. All drivers except Pierre Gasly and Sergio Pérez pitted under safety car conditions. At the end of the safety car period the top 6 were Lewis Hamilton, Valtteri Bottas, Max Verstappen, Gasly, Pérez, and Daniel Ricciardo.

On older tyres and out of position due to not pitting under the safety car, Pérez and Gasly both began to fall down the field. Nonetheless, by the time Ricciardo had passed them a few laps later, he was over 10 seconds behind third placed Max Verstappen and despite a much praised race Ricciardo would be unable to challenge for third.

Sergio Pérez pitted at the end of lap 18 for new hard tyres dropping him to 17th, the last of the runners still on track, before starting to gradually make his way up the field using his newer tyres. On lap 26 Pierre Gasly pitted from 10th position and put on a set of medium tyres that were to see him to the end of the race. He came out in 16th position, behind every driver other than Charles Leclerc who had been forced to make a second pit stop due to a pneumatics issue. Similarly to Pérez before him Gasly used his newer tyres to start to make his way through the field, by lap 36 he was in 10th position behind Pérez in 9th. Gasly passed Pérez on lap 39 before closing the gap to Lance Stroll whom he passed on lap 42 to take 8th position where he finished.

Hamilton won the race, having led for every lap, followed by Bottas and Verstappen who had also held second and third respectively for the entire race. Ricciardo completed the fastest lap, a 1:47.483, on the final lap of the race for an extra championship point and closing the gap to Max Verstappen in third to just over three seconds. He finished in fourth, a position he had held the entire race other than briefly during and immediately after the safety car due to Gasly and Pérez not pitting. Ocon was able to overtake Albon on the last lap. The race was also notable for Kimi Räikkönen finishing ahead of both Ferraris, including his former teammate Vettel.

=== Race classification ===
Pos.	No.	Driver	Constructor	Laps	Time/Retired	Grid	Points
1	44	(United Kingdom) Lewis Hamilton	Mercedes	44	1:24:08.761	1	25
2	77	(Finland) Valtteri Bottas	Mercedes	44	+8.448	2	18
3	33	(Netherlands) Max Verstappen	Red Bull Racing-Honda	44	+15.455	3	15
4	3	(Australia) Daniel Ricciardo	Renault	44	+18.877	4	13^{1}
5	31	(France) Esteban Ocon	Renault	44	+40.650	6	10
6	23	(Thailand) Alexander Albon	Red Bull Racing-Honda	44	+42.712	5	8
7	4	(United Kingdom) Lando Norris	McLaren-Renault	44	+43.774	10	6
8	10	(France) Pierre Gasly	AlphaTauri-Honda	44	+47.371	12	4
9	18	(Canada) Lance Stroll	Racing Point-BWT Mercedes	44	+52.603	9	2
10	11	(Mexico) Sergio Pérez	Racing Point-BWT Mercedes	44	+53.179	8	1
11	26	(Russia) Daniil Kvyat	AlphaTauri-Honda	44	+1:10.200	11	
12	7	(Finland) Kimi Räikkönen	Alfa Romeo Racing-Ferrari	44	+1:11.504	16	
13	5	(Germany) Sebastian Vettel	Ferrari	44	+1:12.894	14	
14	16	(Monaco) Charles Leclerc	Ferrari	44	+1:14.920	13	
15	8	(France) Romain Grosjean	Haas-Ferrari	44	+1:16.793	17	
16	6	(Canada) Nicholas Latifi	Williams-Mercedes	44	+1:17.795	19	
17	20	(Denmark) Kevin Magnussen	Haas-Ferrari	44	+1:25.540	20	
Ret	99	(Italy) Antonio Giovinazzi	Alfa Romeo Racing-Ferrari	9	Accident	18	
Ret	63	(United Kingdom) George Russell	Williams-Mercedes	9	Debris/Collision	15	
DNS	55	(Spain) Carlos Sainz Jr.	McLaren-Renault	0	Power unit/Exhaust	—^{2}	
Fastest lap: (Australia) Daniel Ricciardo (Renault) – 1:47.483 (lap 44)

Notes

- ^1 – Includes one point for fastest lap.
- ^2 – Carlos Sainz Jr. did not start the race, and his place on the grid was left vacant.

== Championship standings after the race ==
Drivers' Championship standings

	Pos.	Driver	Points
	1	(United Kingdom) Lewis Hamilton	157
	2	(Netherlands) Max Verstappen	110
	3	(Finland) Valtteri Bottas	107
2	4	(Thailand) Alexander Albon	48
1	5	(Monaco) Charles Leclerc	45

Constructors' Championship standings

	Pos.	Constructor	Points
	1	(Germany) Mercedes	264
	2	(Austria) Red Bull Racing-Honda	158
1	3	(United Kingdom) McLaren-Renault	68
1	4	(United Kingdom) Racing Point-BWT Mercedes	66 (Note: Racing Point was deducted 15 points after a protest from Renault was upheld regarding the legality of their car.)
	5	(Italy) Ferrari	61

- Note: Only the top five positions are included for both sets of standings.

== See also ==
- 2020 Spa-Francorchamps Formula 2 round
- 2020 Spa-Francorchamps Formula 3 round

== Notes ==
Previous race: 2020 Spanish Grand Prix	FIA Formula One World Championship; 2020 season	Next race: 2020 Italian Grand Prix
Previous race: 2019 Belgian Grand Prix	Belgian Grand Prix	Next race: 2021 Belgian Grand Prix
