= 70th Anniversary Grand Prix =

5th round of the 2020 Formula One season

Race 5 of 17 (Note: The outbreak of the COVID-19 pandemic saw several Grands Prix cancelled or rescheduled. The revised calendar consisted of seventeen races.) in the 2020 Formula One World Championship
← Previous race	Next race →
- Layout of the Silverstone Circuit

Race details
- Date: 9 August 2020
- Official name: Emirates Formula 1 70th Anniversary Grand Prix 2020
- Location: Silverstone Circuit; Silverstone, United Kingdom
- Course: Permanent racing facility
- Course length: 5.891 km (3.660 miles)
- Distance: 52 laps, 306.198 km (190.263 miles)
- Weather: Sunny
- Attendance: 0 (Note: The Grand Prix was held behind closed doors due to the COVID-19 pandemic in the United Kingdom.)

Pole position
Driver	(Finland) Valtteri Bottas	Mercedes
- Time: 1:25.154

Fastest lap
Driver	(United Kingdom) Lewis Hamilton	Mercedes
- Time: 1:28.451 on lap 43

Podium
First	(Netherlands) Max Verstappen	Red Bull Racing-Honda
Second	(United Kingdom) Lewis Hamilton	Mercedes
Third	(Finland) Valtteri Bottas	Mercedes

Logo - 70 years Formula 1

The 70th Anniversary Grand Prix (officially known as the Emirates Formula 1 70th Anniversary Grand Prix 2020) was a one-off Formula One motor race held on 9 August 2020 at the Silverstone Circuit in Silverstone, United Kingdom, the second of two back to back races at the venue, after the 2020 British Grand Prix seven days earlier. The race was the fifth round of the rescheduled 2020 Formula One World Championship. It was held as a 70-year commemoration race of the first Formula One World Championship race which was held at the same circuit in 1950.

The race was won by Red Bull Racing driver Max Verstappen. This was the first non-Mercedes victory in 2020, the first victory for Red Bull at Silverstone in the 1.6 litre V6 turbo hybrid engine era and their first win at the venue since the 2012 British Grand Prix (won by Mark Webber), and the first Honda-powered win at the track since the 1989 British Grand Prix. At this race, runner-up Lewis Hamilton equalled the record for most Formula One podiums (155), previously accomplished by Michael Schumacher.

== Background ==
=== Impact of the COVID-19 pandemic ===
The opening rounds of the 2020 championship were heavily affected by the COVID-19 pandemic. Several Grands Prix were cancelled or postponed after the planned opening round in Australia was called off two days before the race was due to take place, prompting the FIA to draft a new calendar. When the calendar was redrafted following the pandemic the Hungarian and British Grands Prix had swapped dates with the Hungarian Grand Prix moving to 19 July and the British Grand Prix taking the 2 August date. The early cancellation and indefinite postponements prompted a series of double races. The 70th Anniversary Grand Prix was added to the calendar as a one-off event to ensure confirmation of new events.

There had been doubts over whether Silverstone would be able to host Formula One due to quarantine measures proposed by the British government; hopes were raised again by an apparent intervention by Prime Minister Boris Johnson encouraging his ministers to give Formula One an exemption for racing to go ahead. The British Government did give approval for Formula One at Silverstone.

The addition to the calendar of the 70th Anniversary Grand Prix on 9 August, also at Silverstone, meant that for the first time in twenty-seven years the United Kingdom hosted two Formula One races in the same season. The last season to have two British races in a season prior to this was the 1993 season when Donington Park hosted the European Grand Prix and Silverstone hosted the British Grand Prix. It was later revealed that Silverstone had offered to hold as many as 12 races in total during the season.

Similarly to the opening three rounds, both the British Grand Prix and the 70th Anniversary Grand Prix were held 'behind closed doors' without spectators. Northamptonshire Police reiterated the importance of fans staying away from Silverstone for public health reasons during the two Grand Prix weekends and that strict measures would be in place to stop unauthorised persons from entering the circuit.

=== Entrants ===
The drivers and teams were the same as the pre-season entry list with the only exception being Sergio Pérez, who was replaced by Nico Hülkenberg, as had also been the case at the British Grand Prix seven days earlier. Robert Kubica took part in the first practice session for Alfa Romeo Racing, replacing Antonio Giovinazzi.

It had been widely reported that Pérez would miss the Grand Prix as he tested positive for the coronavirus (which can cause COVID-19) three days before the British Grand Prix, which was in line with the British government COVID-19 requirements at the time of the race for those who have tested positive to self-isolate for ten days. United Kingdom COVID-19 quarantine rules prior to 30 July (the day of Pérez's positive test) stated that persons must self isolate for seven rather than ten days, meaning Pérez could race in the 70th Anniversary Grand Prix if he returned a negative test the Thursday before that race. However, it was reported following qualifying for the British Grand Prix that since Formula One was relying on the goodwill of the relevant authorities to host races, the FIA would demand that Pérez undergo a ten-day isolation period, although no formal announcement was made by Formula One or the FIA on the matter. On 6 August, Racing Point confirmed that this was not the case and that Pérez would be able to race provided he returned a negative coronavirus test. However, Pérez did test positive, and thus Nico Hülkenberg was confirmed to enter instead of him.

=== Tyre choices ===
Pirelli brought the medium hardness range of C2, C3 and C4 compound tyres for teams to use in the race, by contrast the 2020 British Grand Prix held on the same circuit layout the week before saw the hardest available C1, C2 and C3 selection used – the change was made to add strategic interest to the second race and to make sure the teams use the three practice sessions. This came after plans to have a reverse starting grid at the second event were opposed by Mercedes.

The previous race at Silverstone had seen three cars – those of Lewis Hamilton, Valtteri Bottas and Carlos Sainz Jr. – experiencing punctures in the closing stages. Following the race, proposals were made to retain the same tyre compounds for the 70th Anniversary Grand Prix, since the softer compounds planned to be used would be more susceptible to wear and degradation. Pirelli decided to stick to its original selection of the C2, C3, and C4 tyres, albeit with increased minimum tyre pressures stipulated, arguing that the tyre failures had occurred as a result of the drivers in question having made a sole tyre change very early in the race thereby subjecting the tyres to a too long stint. The drivers who had made more than one pitstop or simply made their sole stop later, did indeed not suffer tyre failures. Moreover, more pitstops were expected for the second Silverstone race anyway due to the softer compounds. Furthermore, the planned running of 2021 prototype tyres in the second practice session was scrapped in order to allow teams more time to optimise the running of their race packages (meaning car and tyres) with the new tyre pressure limits.

== Practice ==
The first practice session passed without incident and ended with Valtteri Bottas fastest ahead of Mercedes teammate Lewis Hamilton and Red Bull's Max Verstappen. The second session ended with Hamilton quickest followed by Bottas and the Renault of Daniel Ricciardo. Towards the end of the session, Sebastian Vettel's Ferrari and Antonio Giovinazzi's Alfa Romeo both suffered engine failures, with the latter bringing out the red flag and ending the session prematurely. The third practice session ran uninterrupted and ended with Hamilton fastest ahead of Bottas and McLaren driver Lando Norris.

== Qualifying ==
Valtteri Bottas took pole ahead of Lewis Hamilton only by 0.064 seconds in the third part of qualifying (Q3) with Nico Hülkenberg qualifying 3rd ahead of Max Verstappen in 4th and Daniel Ricciardo 5th. Both the Mercedes pair (Hamilton and Bottas) and Ricciardo did their best Q3 laps on the medium tyre as opposed to the soft tyre which, in theory, should have been faster. The rest of the top 10 on the grid was Lance Stroll in 6th, Pierre Gasly 7th, Charles Leclerc 8th, Alexander Albon 9th and Lando Norris 10th. Esteban Ocon originally qualified 11th but received a three-place grid penalty for impeding George Russell in the first part of qualifying (Q1). Sebastian Vettel struggled, failing to get through to Q3, only managing 12th fastest in his Ferrari, he was at a loss to explain his lack of performance. Carlos Sainz Jr. was 13th fastest ahead of Romain Grosjean in the Haas while Russell made a 4th successive Q2 appearance this season. Daniil Kvyat was 16th and knocked out after Q1 after having his best lap time deleted for breaching track limits in that session. Rounding out the grid were Kevin Magnussen in 17th, Nicholas Latifi in 18th, Antonio Giovinazzi in 19th and Kimi Räikkönen 20th and last.

Bottas set a new record for most consecutive Q3 appearances. This was the 67th consecutive race in which Bottas has qualified in the top ten, having done so at every race weekend since the 2017 Australian Grand Prix. He surpassed the previous record of 66 consecutive Q3 appearances, set by Hamilton between the 2010 Chinese Grand Prix and the 2013 Belgian Grand Prix.

=== Qualifying classification ===
Pos.	No.	Driver	Constructor	Qualifying times			Final grid
Pos.	No.	Driver	Constructor	Q1	Q2	Q3	Final grid
1	77	(Finland) Valtteri Bottas	Mercedes	1:26.738	1:25.785	1:25.154	1
2	44	(United Kingdom) Lewis Hamilton	Mercedes	1:26.818	1:26.266	1:25.217	2
3	27	(Germany) Nico Hülkenberg	Racing Point-BWT Mercedes	1:27.279	1:26.261	1:26.082	3
4	33	(Netherlands) Max Verstappen	Red Bull Racing-Honda	1:27.154	1:26.779	1:26.176	4
5	3	(Australia) Daniel Ricciardo	Renault	1:27.442	1:26.636	1:26.297	5
6	18	(Canada) Lance Stroll	Racing Point-BWT Mercedes	1:27.187	1:26.674	1:26.428	6
7	10	(France) Pierre Gasly	AlphaTauri-Honda	1:27.154	1:26.523	1:26.534	7
8	16	(Monaco) Charles Leclerc	Ferrari	1:27.427	1:26.709	1:26.614	8
9	23	(Thailand) Alexander Albon	Red Bull Racing-Honda	1:27.153	1:26.642	1:26.669	9
10	4	(United Kingdom) Lando Norris	McLaren-Renault	1:27.217	1:26.885	1:26.778	10
11	31	(France) Esteban Ocon	Renault	1:27.278	1:27.011	N/A	14^{a}
12	5	(Germany) Sebastian Vettel	Ferrari	1:27.612	1:27.078	N/A	11
13	55	(Spain) Carlos Sainz Jr.	McLaren-Renault	1:27.450	1:27.083	N/A	12
14	8	(France) Romain Grosjean	Haas-Ferrari	1:27.519	1:27.254	N/A	13
15	63	(United Kingdom) George Russell	Williams-Mercedes	1:27.757	1:27.455	N/A	15
16	26	(Russia) Daniil Kvyat	AlphaTauri-Honda	1:27.882	N/A	N/A	16
17	20	(Denmark) Kevin Magnussen	Haas-Ferrari	1:28.236	N/A	N/A	17
18	6	(Canada) Nicholas Latifi	Williams-Mercedes	1:28.430	N/A	N/A	18
19	99	(Italy) Antonio Giovinazzi	Alfa Romeo Racing-Ferrari	1:28.433	N/A	N/A	19
20	7	(Finland) Kimi Räikkönen	Alfa Romeo Racing-Ferrari	1:28.493	N/A	N/A	20
107% time: 1:32.809

Notes

- ^a – Esteban Ocon received a three-place grid penalty for impeding George Russell during qualifying.

== Race ==
=== Race report ===
In the race start, Valtteri Bottas and Lewis Hamilton got a clean getaway, with Max Verstappen almost immediately passing Nico Hülkenberg for third. At turn 1, Sebastian Vettel spun, dropping him to last place. Hamilton tried to close up to and overtake Bottas at Copse corner unsuccessfully. Pierre Gasly, who was using the soft compound tyres, pitted on lap 7. Over the next few laps, the drivers using the soft tyres pitted for hards or mediums compound tyres. A few laps later, Mercedes began struggling with their tyres, with the heat accelerating tyre wear and causing blisters. On lap 13, the race leader Bottas pitted, with Hamilton subsequently pitting on the next lap, allowing Verstappen to inherit the lead and race in clean air. Despite Mercedes now having newer tyres, they kept losing time to Verstappen due to heat degradation and blistering. On lap 26, Verstappen pitted for the medium compound tyres and came out just behind Bottas. However, Verstappen made quick work of him and retook the lead of the race.

On lap 31, Daniel Ricciardo spun while trying to race Carlos Sainz Jr. for 12th. Both Verstappen and Bottas made second pit stops for the hard tyres. Charles Leclerc inherited fifth place after Hülkenberg pitted, lapping around the same pace as the leaders. Hamilton pitted on lap 42, to avoid risk of a tyre failure (which happened in the previous race), ending up behind Leclerc. Kevin Magnussen was forced to retire due to a tyre shortage. Hamilton made quick work of passing Leclerc to take third place. Hülkenberg was forced to pit again due to vibrations in his car, dropping him to seventh. Meanwhile, Bottas struggled with pace, falling behind Verstappen, with Hamilton catching up to him. Hamilton got past Bottas on the DRS straight before Brooklands on lap 50. On lap 51, Alexander Albon got past Lance Stroll to take fifth. Verstappen won the race, around 11 seconds ahead of Hamilton.

=== Race classification ===
Pos.	No.	Driver	Constructor	Laps	Time/Retired	Grid	Points
1	33	(Netherlands) Max Verstappen	Red Bull Racing-Honda	52	1:19:41.993	4	25
2	44	(United Kingdom) Lewis Hamilton	Mercedes	52	+11.326	2	19^{1}
3	77	(Finland) Valtteri Bottas	Mercedes	52	+19.231	1	15
4	16	(Monaco) Charles Leclerc	Ferrari	52	+29.289	8	12
5	23	(Thailand) Alexander Albon	Red Bull Racing-Honda	52	+39.146	9	10
6	18	(Canada) Lance Stroll	Racing Point-BWT Mercedes	52	+42.538	6	8
7	27	(Germany) Nico Hülkenberg	Racing Point-BWT Mercedes	52	+55.951	3	6
8	31	(France) Esteban Ocon	Renault	52	+1:04.773	14	4
9	4	(United Kingdom) Lando Norris	McLaren-Renault	52	+1:05.544	10	2
10	26	(Russia) Daniil Kvyat	AlphaTauri-Honda	52	+1:09.669	16	1
11	10	(France) Pierre Gasly	AlphaTauri-Honda	52	+1:10.642	7	
12	5	(Germany) Sebastian Vettel	Ferrari	52	+1:13.370	11	
13	55	(Spain) Carlos Sainz Jr.	McLaren-Renault	52	+1:14.070	12	
14	3	(Australia) Daniel Ricciardo	Renault	51	+1 lap	5	
15	7	(Finland) Kimi Räikkönen	Alfa Romeo Racing-Ferrari	51	+1 lap	20	
16	8	(France) Romain Grosjean	Haas-Ferrari	51	+1 lap	13	
17	99	(Italy) Antonio Giovinazzi	Alfa Romeo Racing-Ferrari	51	+1 lap	19	
18	63	(United Kingdom) George Russell	Williams-Mercedes	51	+1 lap	15	
19	6	(Canada) Nicholas Latifi	Williams-Mercedes	51	+1 lap	18	
Ret	20	(Denmark) Kevin Magnussen	Haas-Ferrari	43	Tyre shortage^{2}	17	
Fastest lap: (United Kingdom) Lewis Hamilton (Mercedes) – 1:28.451 (lap 43)

Notes

- ^1 – Includes one point for fastest lap.
- ^2 – Kevin Magnussen received a five-second time penalty for leaving the track and rejoining unsafely, but it was unapplied as he retired from the race.

== Championship standings after the race ==
Drivers' Championship standings

	Pos.	Driver	Points
	1	(United Kingdom) Lewis Hamilton	107
1	2	(Netherlands) Max Verstappen	77
1	3	(Finland) Valtteri Bottas	73
1	4	(Monaco) Charles Leclerc	45
1	5	(United Kingdom) Lando Norris	38

Constructors' Championship standings

	Pos.	Constructor	Points
	1	(Germany) Mercedes	180
	2	(Austria) Red Bull Racing-Honda	113
1	3	(Italy) Ferrari	55
1	4	(United Kingdom) McLaren-Renault	53
	5	(United Kingdom) Racing Point-BWT Mercedes	41 (Note: Racing Point was deducted 15 points after a protest from Renault was upheld regarding the legality of their car.)

- Note: Only the top five positions are included for both sets of standings.

== See also ==
- 2020 2nd Silverstone Formula 2 round
- 2020 2nd Silverstone Formula 3 round

== Notes ==
Previous race: 2020 British Grand Prix	FIA Formula One World Championship; 2020 season	Next race: 2020 Spanish Grand Prix
Previous race: None	70th Anniversary Grand Prix	Next race: None; Next race at Silverstone Circuit: 2021 British Grand Prix
