= 2020 Spanish Grand Prix =

Race 6 of 17 (Note: The outbreak of the COVID-19 pandemic saw several Grands Prix cancelled or rescheduled. The revised calendar consisted of seventeen races.) in the 2020 Formula One World Championship
← Previous race	Next race →
- Layout of the Circuit de Barcelona-Catalunya

Race details
- Date: 16 August 2020
- Official name: Formula 1 Aramco Gran Premio de España 2020
- Location: Circuit de Barcelona-Catalunya; Montmeló, Spain
- Course: Permanent racing facility
- Course length: 4.655 km (2.892 miles)
- Distance: 66 laps, 307.104 km (190.825 miles)
- Weather: Partly cloudy
- Attendance: 0 (Note: The Grand Prix was held behind closed doors due to the COVID-19 pandemic in Spain.)

Pole position
Driver	(United Kingdom) Lewis Hamilton	Mercedes
- Time: 1:15.584

Fastest lap
Driver	(Finland) Valtteri Bottas	Mercedes
- Time: 1:18.183 on lap 66 (lap record)

Podium
First	(United Kingdom) Lewis Hamilton	Mercedes
Second	(Netherlands) Max Verstappen	Red Bull Racing-Honda
Third	(Finland) Valtteri Bottas	Mercedes

The 2020 Spanish Grand Prix (officially known as the Formula 1 Aramco Gran Premio de España 2020) was a Formula One motor race held on 16 August 2020 at the Circuit de Barcelona-Catalunya in Montmeló, Spain. The race was the sixth round in the 2020 Formula One World Championship, and took place one week after the previous round, the 70th Anniversary Grand Prix.

== Background ==
=== Impact of the COVID-19 pandemic ===
The opening rounds of the 2020 championship were heavily affected by the COVID-19 pandemic. Several Grands Prix were cancelled or postponed after the planned opening round in Australia was called off two days before the race was due to take place; prompting the FIA to draft a new calendar. The Spanish Grand Prix was originally intended to be held on 10 May.

=== Championship standings before the race ===
Mercedes driver Lewis Hamilton led the Drivers' Championship by 30 points from Red Bull-Honda driver Max Verstappen. Four points behind Verstappen was Hamilton's teammate Valtteri Bottas. In the Constructors' Championship, Mercedes led by 67 points from Red Bull Racing. In third place was Ferrari, who were 58 points behind Red Bull and 2 points ahead of fourth-placed McLaren.

=== Entrants ===
The drivers and teams were the same as those on the season entry list with no additional stand-in drivers for the race. Roy Nissany took part in the first practice session for Williams in place of George Russell.

=== Tyres ===
The C1, C2 and C3 tyre compounds were made available for teams to use by Pirelli, the hardest three tyre compounds available. These were the same compounds used at the 2019 event.

== Free practice ==
Bottas topped the first practice session ahead of teammate Hamilton. Hamilton went on to top the other two sessions, while Esteban Ocon (driving for the Renault team) spun into the wall during the final session while attempting to avoid a collision with the Haas of Kevin Magnussen.

== Qualifying ==
=== Qualifying report ===
Hamilton claimed his 92nd pole position in Formula One, beating Bottas, his teammate, by a less than a tenth of a second. It was the eighth consecutive year that a Mercedes driver had taken pole for the Spanish Grand Prix. Bottas said that Hamilton's speed advantage came in the final part of the lap. Verstappen was third ahead of the two Racing Points of Sergio Pérez and Lance Stroll. Alex Albon qualified in sixth, over seven-tenths of a second behind teammate Verstappen. McLaren teammates Carlos Sainz Jr and Lando Norris qualified in seventh and eighth while Charles Leclerc qualified ninth for Ferrari with a time less than a tenth of a second slower than Albon's time. Scuderia AlphaTauri driver Pierre Gasly qualified tenth after he could not match the pace he had had in the second part of qualifying during the top ten shootout. Ferrari's Sebastian Vettel and AlphaTauri's Daniil Kvyat were slower than their teammates and failed to make it out of the second segment. Vettel qualified eleventh and Kvyat twelfth. The Renault cars had looked fast in practice but Daniel Ricciardo could only manage thirteenth place while Ocon was fifteenth. Lap times were slower than those in qualifying for the 2019 Spanish Grand Prix because of the hot August weather.

=== Qualifying classification ===
Pos.	No.	Driver	Constructor	Qualifying times			Final grid
Pos.	No.	Driver	Constructor	Q1	Q2	Q3	Final grid
1	44	(United Kingdom) Lewis Hamilton	Mercedes	1:16.872	1:16.013	1:15.584	1
2	77	(Finland) Valtteri Bottas	Mercedes	1:17.243	1:16.152	1:15.643	2
3	33	(Netherlands) Max Verstappen	Red Bull Racing-Honda	1:17.213	1:16.518	1:16.292	3
4	11	(Mexico) Sergio Pérez	Racing Point-BWT Mercedes	1:17.117	1:16.936	1:16.482	4
5	18	(Canada) Lance Stroll	Racing Point-BWT Mercedes	1:17.316	1:16.666	1:16.589	5
6	23	(Thailand) Alexander Albon	Red Bull Racing-Honda	1:17.419	1:17.163	1:17.029	6
7	55	(Spain) Carlos Sainz Jr.	McLaren-Renault	1:17.438	1:16.876	1:17.044	7
8	4	(United Kingdom) Lando Norris	McLaren-Renault	1:17.577	1:17.166	1:17.084	8
9	16	(Monaco) Charles Leclerc	Ferrari	1:17.256	1:16.953	1:17.087	9
10	10	(France) Pierre Gasly	AlphaTauri-Honda	1:17.356	1:16.800	1:17.136	10
11	5	(Germany) Sebastian Vettel	Ferrari	1:17.573	1:17.168	N/A	11
12	26	(Russia) Daniil Kvyat	AlphaTauri-Honda	1:17.676	1:17.192	N/A	12
13	3	(Australia) Daniel Ricciardo	Renault	1:17.667	1:17.198	N/A	13
14	7	(Finland) Kimi Räikkönen	Alfa Romeo Racing-Ferrari	1:17.797	1:17.386	N/A	14
15	31	(France) Esteban Ocon	Renault	1:17.765	1:17.567	N/A	15
16	20	(Denmark) Kevin Magnussen	Haas-Ferrari	1:17.908	N/A	N/A	16
17	8	(France) Romain Grosjean	Haas-Ferrari	1:18.089	N/A	N/A	17
18	63	(United Kingdom) George Russell	Williams-Mercedes	1:18.099	N/A	N/A	18
19	6	(Canada) Nicholas Latifi	Williams-Mercedes	1:18.532	N/A	N/A	19
20	99	(Italy) Antonio Giovinazzi	Alfa Romeo Racing-Ferrari	1:18.697	N/A	N/A	20
107% time: 1:22.253

== Race ==
=== Race report ===
The race took place in dry conditions with track temperatures varying between 42 °C (108 °F) and 50 °C (122 °F). After starting in second, Bottas was overtaken by Verstappen and Stroll at the first corner. Bottas then used the drag reduction system on the fifth lap to pass Stroll and move back up into third place. Hamilton won the race by 24 seconds, lapping everyone except for Verstappen and Bottas, who completed the podium in second and third place. Ferrari driver Charles Leclerc retired from the race with a mechanical problem after he spun at the chicane. Leclerc's teammate Sebastian Vettel finished seventh after driving for more than half the race distance on one set of soft tyres.

=== Race classification ===
Pos.	No.	Driver	Constructor	Laps	Time/Retired	Grid	Points
1	44	(United Kingdom) Lewis Hamilton	Mercedes	66	1:31:45.279	1	25
2	33	(Netherlands) Max Verstappen	Red Bull Racing-Honda	66	+24.177	3	18
3	77	(Finland) Valtteri Bottas	Mercedes	66	+44.752	2	16^{1}
4	18	(Canada) Lance Stroll	Racing Point-BWT Mercedes	65	+1 lap	5	12
5	11	(Mexico) Sergio Pérez	Racing Point-BWT Mercedes	65	+1 lap^{2}	4	10
6	55	(Spain) Carlos Sainz Jr.	McLaren-Renault	65	+1 lap	7	8
7	5	(Germany) Sebastian Vettel	Ferrari	65	+1 lap	11	6
8	23	(Thailand) Alexander Albon	Red Bull Racing-Honda	65	+1 lap	6	4
9	10	(France) Pierre Gasly	AlphaTauri-Honda	65	+1 lap	10	2
10	4	(United Kingdom) Lando Norris	McLaren-Renault	65	+1 lap	8	1
11	3	(Australia) Daniel Ricciardo	Renault	65	+1 lap	13	
12	26	(Russia) Daniil Kvyat	AlphaTauri-Honda	65	+1 lap^{3}	12	
13	31	(France) Esteban Ocon	Renault	65	+1 lap	15	
14	7	(Finland) Kimi Räikkönen	Alfa Romeo Racing-Ferrari	65	+1 lap	14	
15	20	(Denmark) Kevin Magnussen	Haas-Ferrari	65	+1 lap	16	
16	99	(Italy) Antonio Giovinazzi	Alfa Romeo Racing-Ferrari	65	+1 lap	20	
17	63	(United Kingdom) George Russell	Williams-Mercedes	65	+1 lap	18	
18	6	(Canada) Nicholas Latifi	Williams-Mercedes	64	+2 laps	19	
19	8	(France) Romain Grosjean	Haas-Ferrari	64	+2 laps	17	
Ret	16	(Monaco) Charles Leclerc	Ferrari	38	Electrical	9	
Fastest lap: (Finland) Valtteri Bottas (Mercedes) – 1:18.183 (lap 66)

Notes

- ^1 – Includes one point for fastest lap.
- ^2 – Sergio Pérez finished fourth on the track, but received a five-second time penalty for ignoring blue flags.
- ^3 – Daniil Kvyat received a five-second time penalty for ignoring blue flags. His final position was not affected by the penalty.

== Championship standings after the race ==
Drivers' Championship standings

	Pos.	Driver	Points
	1	(United Kingdom) Lewis Hamilton	132
	2	(Netherlands) Max Verstappen	95
	3	(Finland) Valtteri Bottas	89
	4	(Monaco) Charles Leclerc	45
1	5	(Canada) Lance Stroll	40

Constructors' Championship standings

	Pos.	Constructor	Points
	1	(Germany) Mercedes	221
	2	(Austria) Red Bull Racing-Honda	135
2	3	(United Kingdom) Racing Point-BWT Mercedes	63 (Note: Racing Point was deducted 15 points after a protest from Renault was upheld regarding the legality of their car.)
	4	(United Kingdom) McLaren-Renault	62
2	5	(Italy) Ferrari	61

- Note: Only the top five positions are included for both sets of standings.

== See also ==
- 2020 Barcelona Formula 2 round
- 2020 Barcelona Formula 3 round

== Notes ==
Previous race: 70th Anniversary Grand Prix	FIA Formula One World Championship; 2020 season	Next race: 2020 Belgian Grand Prix
Previous race: 2019 Spanish Grand Prix	Spanish Grand Prix	Next race: 2021 Spanish Grand Prix
