= 2020 Italian Grand Prix =

Formula One race

Race 8 of 17 (Note: The outbreak of the COVID-19 pandemic saw several Grands Prix cancelled or rescheduled. The revised calendar consisted of seventeen races.) in the 2020 Formula One World Championship
← Previous race	Next race →
- Layout of the Monza circuit

Race details
- Date: 6 September 2020
- Official name: Formula 1 Gran Premio Heineken d'Italia 2020
- Location: Autodromo Nazionale di Monza; Monza, Italy
- Course: Permanent racing facility
- Course length: 5.793 km (3.600 miles)
- Distance: 53 laps, 306.720 km (190.587 miles)
- Weather: Sunny
- Attendance: 0 (Note: The Grand Prix was held behind closed doors due to the COVID-19 pandemic in Italy.)

Pole position
Driver	(United Kingdom) Lewis Hamilton	Mercedes
- Time: 1:18.887

Fastest lap
Driver	(United Kingdom) Lewis Hamilton	Mercedes
- Time: 1:22.746 on lap 34

Podium
First	(France) Pierre Gasly	AlphaTauri-Honda
Second	(Spain) Carlos Sainz Jr.	McLaren-Renault
Third	(Canada) Lance Stroll	Racing Point-BWT Mercedes

The 2020 Italian Grand Prix (officially known as the Formula 1 Gran Premio Heineken d'Italia 2020) was a Formula One motor race that was held on 6 September 2020 at the Autodromo Nazionale di Monza in Monza, Italy. The race was the eighth round in the 2020 Formula One World Championship.

The race was won by Pierre Gasly of AlphaTauri-Honda, who took his first Formula One win and became the first French Formula One driver to win a race since Olivier Panis won the 1996 Monaco Grand Prix. Gasly started the race in tenth, but gained positions due to a well-timed pit-stop prior to a safety car, sent to retrieve the broken car of Kevin Magnussen. Lewis Hamilton, who led the race until this point, was given a penalty for entering the pit lane when it was closed, passing the lead to Gasly, who defended from McLaren's Carlos Sainz Jr. in the closing stages of the race. Racing Point's Lance Stroll completed the podium. It turned out to be the organisation's only Grand Prix win under the Scuderia AlphaTauri name, as well as Gasly's only Grand Prix win, as of 2026.

Both Ferrari drivers retired from the race; Sebastian Vettel due to brake failure, and Charles Leclerc, the winner of the previous year's Grand Prix, due to an accident. This was the first race since the 2012 Hungarian Grand Prix to not have a Red Bull, Mercedes, or Ferrari driver on the podium, the first of those podiums to feature three different teams since the 2012 Canadian Grand Prix and the first to feature a red flag since the 2017 Azerbaijan Grand Prix. It was also the first race not to be won by a driver from Red Bull, Mercedes, or Ferrari since the 2013 Australian Grand Prix. Lance Stroll also scored his first podium since the 2017 Azerbaijan Grand Prix. It was the first instance of there being two standing starts since the 2001 Belgian Grand Prix, following a 2018 change in the regulations to allow for standing restarts after a red flag. This race was the last for both Claire Williams and Frank Williams, as they stepped down from their positions at Williams Racing.

== Background ==
=== Impact of the COVID-19 pandemic ===
The opening rounds of the 2020 championship were heavily affected by the COVID-19 pandemic. Several Grands Prix were cancelled or postponed after the planned opening round in Australia was called off two days before the race was due to take place; prompting the Fédération Internationale de l'Automobile to draft a new calendar. However, the Italian Grand Prix was not impacted by this change and kept its original date.

=== Entrants ===
The drivers and teams were the same as the season entry list with no additional stand-in drivers for the race. Roy Nissany drove for Williams in the first practice session, replacing George Russell.

=== Tyres ===
Pirelli brought the C2, C3 and C4 tyres for the race weekend, the second, third, and fourth hardest tyre compounds available.

=== Regulation changes ===
Prior to the race, the governing body, the Fédération Internationale de l'Automobile, issued a technical directive banning qualifying-specific engine modes from the Italian Grand Prix onwards. The ban was initially planned for the 2020 Belgian Grand Prix but it was delayed by one race.

== Practice ==
The first practice session was interrupted briefly when Max Verstappen crashed at the Ascari chicane. The session ended with Valtteri Bottas fastest ahead of Mercedes teammate Lewis Hamilton and Red Bull driver Alexander Albon third fastest. The second practice session ran without major incidents and concluded with Hamilton fastest, followed by Bottas and Lando Norris of McLaren.

Bottas was again fastest in third practice, followed by Carlos Sainz Jr. of McLaren and his teammate Norris. The session was briefly red flagged after Daniel Ricciardo stopped his Renault R.S.20 due to a mechanical failure.

== Qualifying ==
=== Qualifying report ===
Lewis Hamilton took pole, 0.069s ahead of Mercedes teammate Valtteri Bottas. Hamilton's lap time of 1:18.887 was the fastest Formula One lap in history at the time, with an average speed of 264.362 km/h (164.267 mph). It beat the lap record set by Kimi Räikkönen in 2018 by two tenths of a second. The final part of Q1 was marked by numerous cars starting their final flying lap at close distance, hampering each other's performance.

=== Qualifying classification ===
Pos.	No.	Driver	Constructor	Qualifying times			Final grid
Pos.	No.	Driver	Constructor	Q1	Q2	Q3	Final grid
1	44	(United Kingdom) Lewis Hamilton	Mercedes	1:19.514	1:19.092	1:18.887	1
2	77	(Finland) Valtteri Bottas	Mercedes	1:19.786	1:18.952	1:18.956	2
3	55	(Spain) Carlos Sainz Jr.	McLaren-Renault	1:20.099	1:19.705	1:19.695	3
4	11	(Mexico) Sergio Pérez	Racing Point-BWT Mercedes	1:20.048	1:19.718	1:19.720	4
5	33	(Netherlands) Max Verstappen	Red Bull Racing-Honda	1:20.193	1:19.780	1:19.795	5
6	4	(United Kingdom) Lando Norris	McLaren-Renault	1:20.344	1:19.962	1:19.820	6
7	3	(Australia) Daniel Ricciardo	Renault	1:20.548	1:20.031	1:19.864	7
8	18	(Canada) Lance Stroll	Racing Point-BWT Mercedes	1:20.400	1:19.924	1:20.049	8
9	23	(Thailand) Alexander Albon	Red Bull Racing-Honda	1:21.104	1:20.064	1:20.090	9
10	10	(France) Pierre Gasly	AlphaTauri-Honda	1:20.145	1:19.909	1:20.177	10
11	26	(Russia) Daniil Kvyat	AlphaTauri-Honda	1:20.307	1:20.169	N/A	11
12	31	(France) Esteban Ocon	Renault	1:20.747	1:20.234	N/A	12
13	16	(Monaco) Charles Leclerc	Ferrari	1:20.443	1:20.273	N/A	13
14	7	(Finland) Kimi Räikkönen	Alfa Romeo Racing-Ferrari	1:21.010	1:20.926	N/A	14
15	20	(Denmark) Kevin Magnussen	Haas-Ferrari	1:20.869	1:21.573	N/A	15
16	8	(France) Romain Grosjean	Haas-Ferrari	1:21.139	N/A	N/A	16
17	5	(Germany) Sebastian Vettel	Ferrari	1:21.151	N/A	N/A	17
18	99	(Italy) Antonio Giovinazzi	Alfa Romeo Racing-Ferrari	1:21.206	N/A	N/A	18
19	63	(United Kingdom) George Russell	Williams-Mercedes	1:21.587	N/A	N/A	19
20	6	(Canada) Nicholas Latifi	Williams-Mercedes	1:21.717	N/A	N/A	20
107% time: 1:25.079

== Race ==
=== Race report ===
Lewis Hamilton successfully retained the lead position on the start, while his teammate Valtteri Bottas gradually dropped to sixth place over the first two laps while reporting problems with his car. Carlos Sainz pulled away quickly to take Valtteri Bottas off the start claiming second. The McLaren driver went on to pull a gap to the cars behind. During lap six the left-rear brake on Sebastian Vettel's SF1000 overheated to the point that the brake assembly caught fire before disintegrating and flying off the car at the start of lap seven. This caused Vettel to miss a couple of corners (in the process he smashed through the polystyrene chicane direction indicator boxes at the first chicane) before limping to the pits to retire.

On lap 19, Kevin Magnussen's Haas suffered a power unit failure and his car stranded to the side of the pit lane entrance. At the end of the next lap, Pierre Gasly elected to make his pitstop. The safety car was deployed shortly afterwards and the pit lane was closed to allow marshals to safely remove the stranded Haas from the track. Both Hamilton and Antonio Giovinazzi made a pit stop shortly after the safety car had been deployed despite the pit lane being closed. They were both given 10-second stop-and-go penalties for this infraction (Hamilton was given two penalty points on his FIA Super Licence as a result). When the pit lane was re-opened two laps later, most of the field entered to make their pit stop. This allowed Gasly to move into third place behind Hamilton and Lance Stroll, the only driver who did not stop.

The safety car was withdrawn at the end of the next lap, allowing normal race conditions to resume on lap 23. Hamilton held on to the lead ahead of Stroll and Gasly. Charles Leclerc crashed heavily after the restart in the Parabolica corner as the car lost its rear end, entered the gravel trap and collided with the barrier, significantly damaging the tyre barriers and his car in the process. Leclerc experienced some pain in his back following the incident, but a medical examination showed he did not have any injuries. The safety car was deployed initially, but the red flags were brought out shortly afterwards to suspend the race to allow repairs to be made to the tyre barriers.

The race resumed later with a standing restart on lap 28. Stroll went wide at turn four dropping to fifth place in the process, with Gasly inheriting second place. Hamilton served his stop-and-go penalty at the end of the lap while Giovinazzi served his one lap later dropping them to the back of the field. This allowed Gasly to take the lead of the race ahead of Kimi Räikkönen and Carlos Sainz Jr. Over the next 25 laps Gasly held off Räikkönen, who gradually fell back to an eventual 13th-place finish, and Sainz to secure victory. Stroll meanwhile fought back to third place to complete the podium.

Gasly took his first Formula One victory and gave AlphaTauri their first win as a constructor and second win as a team, over 12 years since Vettel won the 2008 Italian Grand Prix when the team was known as Toro Rosso. Gasly's victory was the first for a French driver in Formula One since Olivier Panis at the 1996 Monaco Grand Prix, and the 80th F1 World Championship race win for a French driver overall. The win also made Honda the first engine manufacturer to win with two different teams in the sport's V6 turbo-hybrid era.

The result marked the first time that Ferrari, Mercedes and Red Bull all failed to score a podium finish since the 2012 Hungarian Grand Prix. It was also the first time since Räikkönen won the 2013 Australian Grand Prix driving for Lotus F1 that the race winner did not drive for Ferrari, Mercedes or Red Bull. The race contributed to discussions over potential future changes to Formula One race weekend formats.

As Claire and Frank Williams ceased their involvement with the Williams team after this Grand Prix, tributes were paid to the pair from around the paddock by drivers, including from George Russell and Nicholas Latifi, the Williams drivers, as they crossed the line.

=== Race classification ===
Pos.	No.	Driver	Constructor	Laps	Time/Retired	Grid	Points
1	10	(France) Pierre Gasly	AlphaTauri-Honda	53	1:47:06.056	10	25
2	55	(Spain) Carlos Sainz Jr.	McLaren-Renault	53	+0.415	3	18
3	18	(Canada) Lance Stroll	Racing Point-BWT Mercedes	53	+3.358	8	15
4	4	(United Kingdom) Lando Norris	McLaren-Renault	53	+6.000	6	12
5	77	(Finland) Valtteri Bottas	Mercedes	53	+7.108	2	10
6	3	(Australia) Daniel Ricciardo	Renault	53	+8.391	7	8
7	44	(United Kingdom) Lewis Hamilton	Mercedes	53	+17.245	1	7^{1}
8	31	(France) Esteban Ocon	Renault	53	+18.691	12	4
9	26	(Russia) Daniil Kvyat	AlphaTauri-Honda	53	+22.208	11	2
10	11	(Mexico) Sergio Pérez	Racing Point-BWT Mercedes	53	+23.224	4	1
11	6	(Canada) Nicholas Latifi	Williams-Mercedes	53	+32.876	20	
12	8	(France) Romain Grosjean	Haas-Ferrari	53	+35.164	16	
13	7	(Finland) Kimi Räikkönen	Alfa Romeo Racing-Ferrari	53	+36.312	14	
14	63	(United Kingdom) George Russell	Williams-Mercedes	53	+36.593	19	
15	23	(Thailand) Alexander Albon	Red Bull Racing-Honda	53	+37.533	9	
16	99	(Italy) Antonio Giovinazzi	Alfa Romeo Racing-Ferrari	53	+55.199	18	
Ret	33	(Netherlands) Max Verstappen	Red Bull Racing-Honda	30	Power unit	5	
Ret	16	(Monaco) Charles Leclerc	Ferrari	23	Accident	13	
Ret	20	(Denmark) Kevin Magnussen	Haas-Ferrari	17	Power unit	15	
Ret	5	(Germany) Sebastian Vettel	Ferrari	6	Brakes	17	
Fastest lap: (United Kingdom) Lewis Hamilton (Mercedes) – 1:22.746 (lap 34)

Notes

- ^1 – Includes one point for fastest lap.

== Championship standings after the race ==
Drivers' Championship standings

	Pos.	Driver	Points
	1	(United Kingdom) Lewis Hamilton	164
1	2	(Finland) Valtteri Bottas	117
1	3	(Netherlands) Max Verstappen	110
3	4	(Canada) Lance Stroll	57
1	5	(United Kingdom) Lando Norris	57

Constructors' Championship standings

	Pos.	Constructor	Points
	1	(Germany) Mercedes	281
	2	(Austria) Red Bull Racing-Honda	158
	3	(United Kingdom) McLaren-Renault	98
	4	(United Kingdom) Racing Point-BWT Mercedes	82 (Note: Racing Point was deducted 15 points after a protest from Renault was upheld regarding the legality of their car.)
1	5	(France) Renault	71

- Note: Only the top five positions are included for both sets of standings.

== See also ==
- 2020 Monza Formula 2 round
- 2020 Monza Formula 3 round

== Notes ==
Previous race: 2020 Belgian Grand Prix	FIA Formula One World Championship; 2020 season	Next race: 2020 Tuscan Grand Prix
Previous race: 2019 Italian Grand Prix	Italian Grand Prix	Next race: 2021 Italian Grand Prix
