= 2020 Formula One World Championship =

71st season of the Formula One World Championship

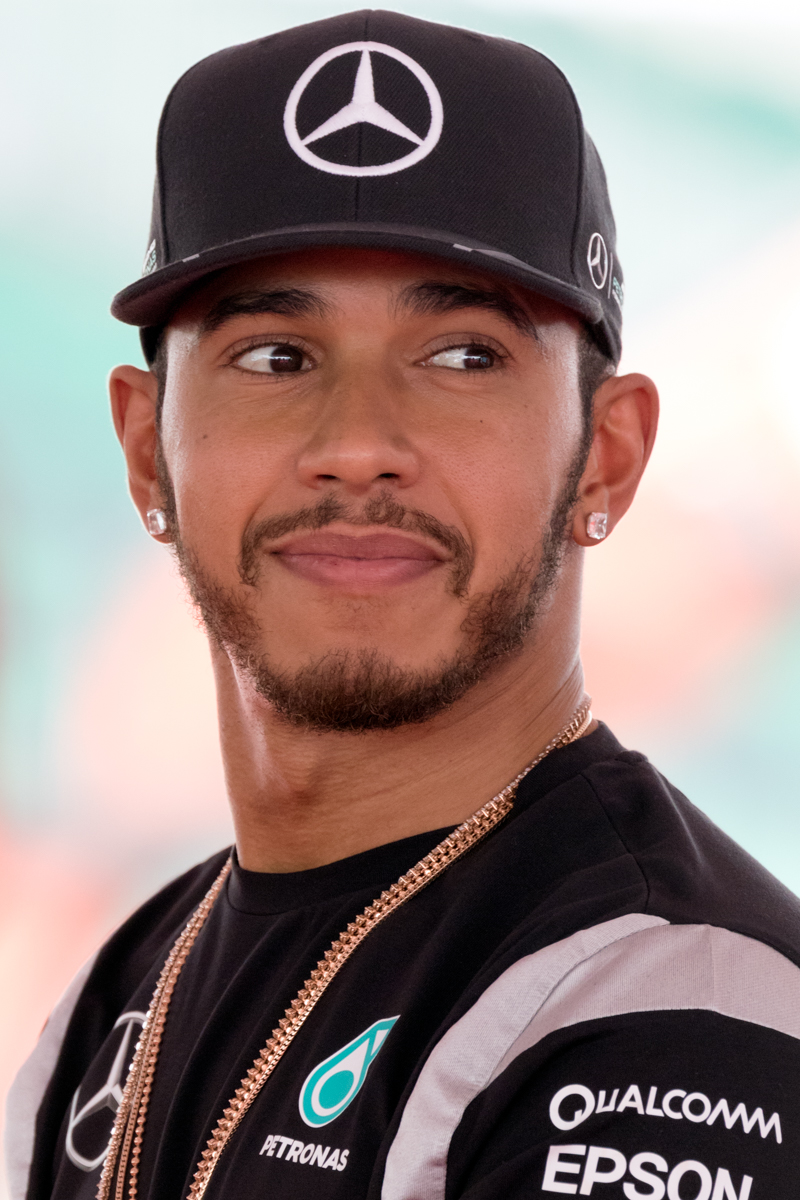
Lewis Hamilton won a record equalling seventh Drivers' Championship, driving for Mercedes, his fourth title in a row.

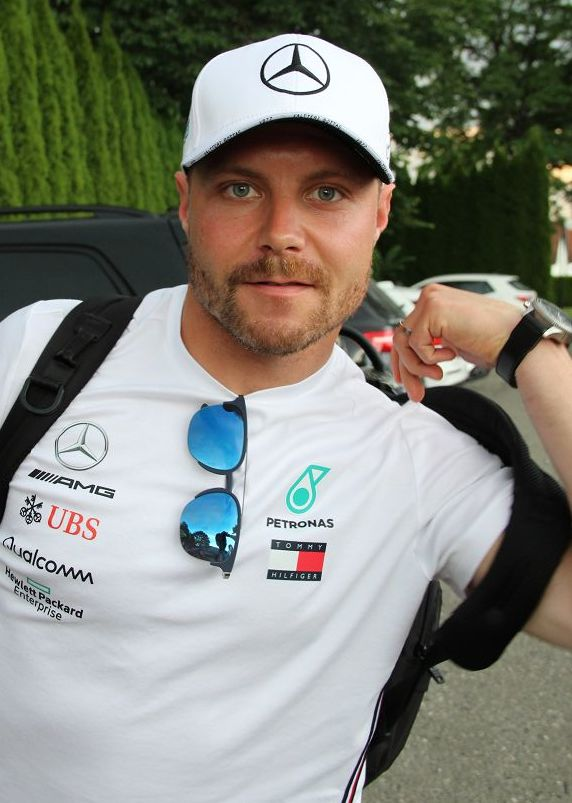
Valtteri Bottas was runner-up, also driving for Mercedes.

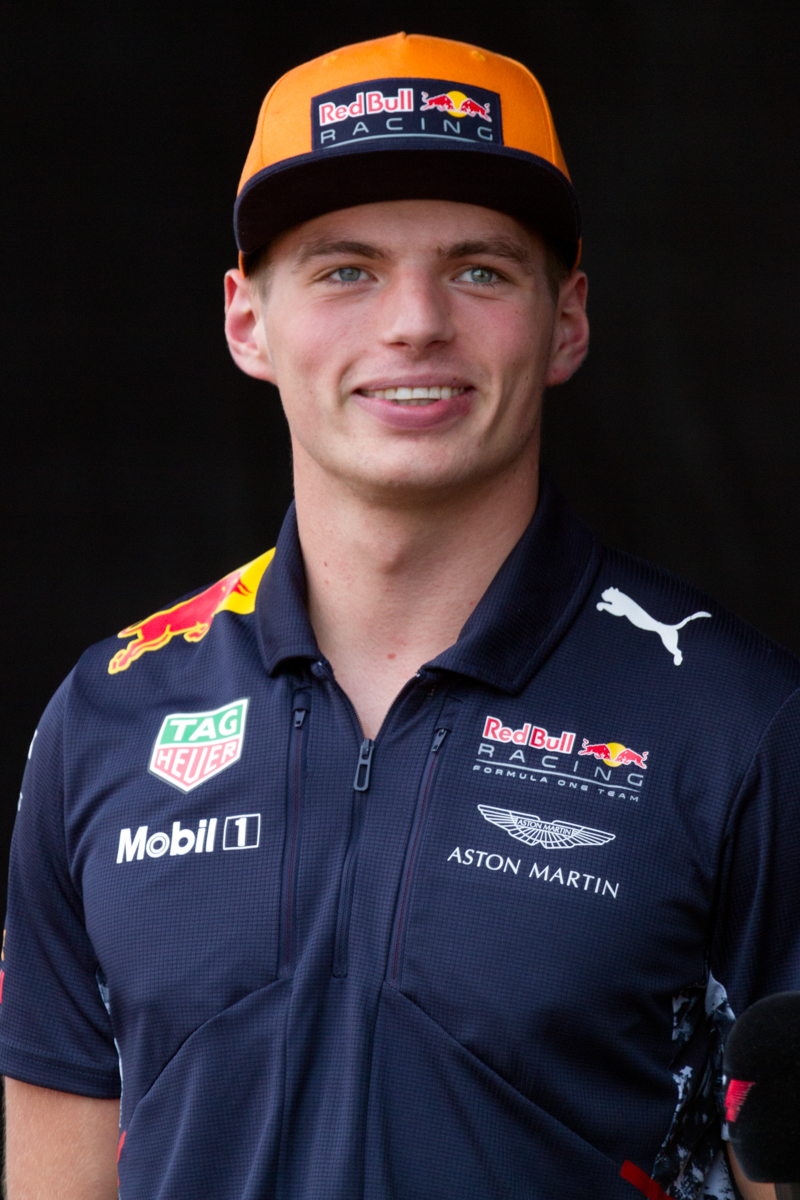
Max Verstappen finished the season in third place, driving for Red Bull Racing-Honda.

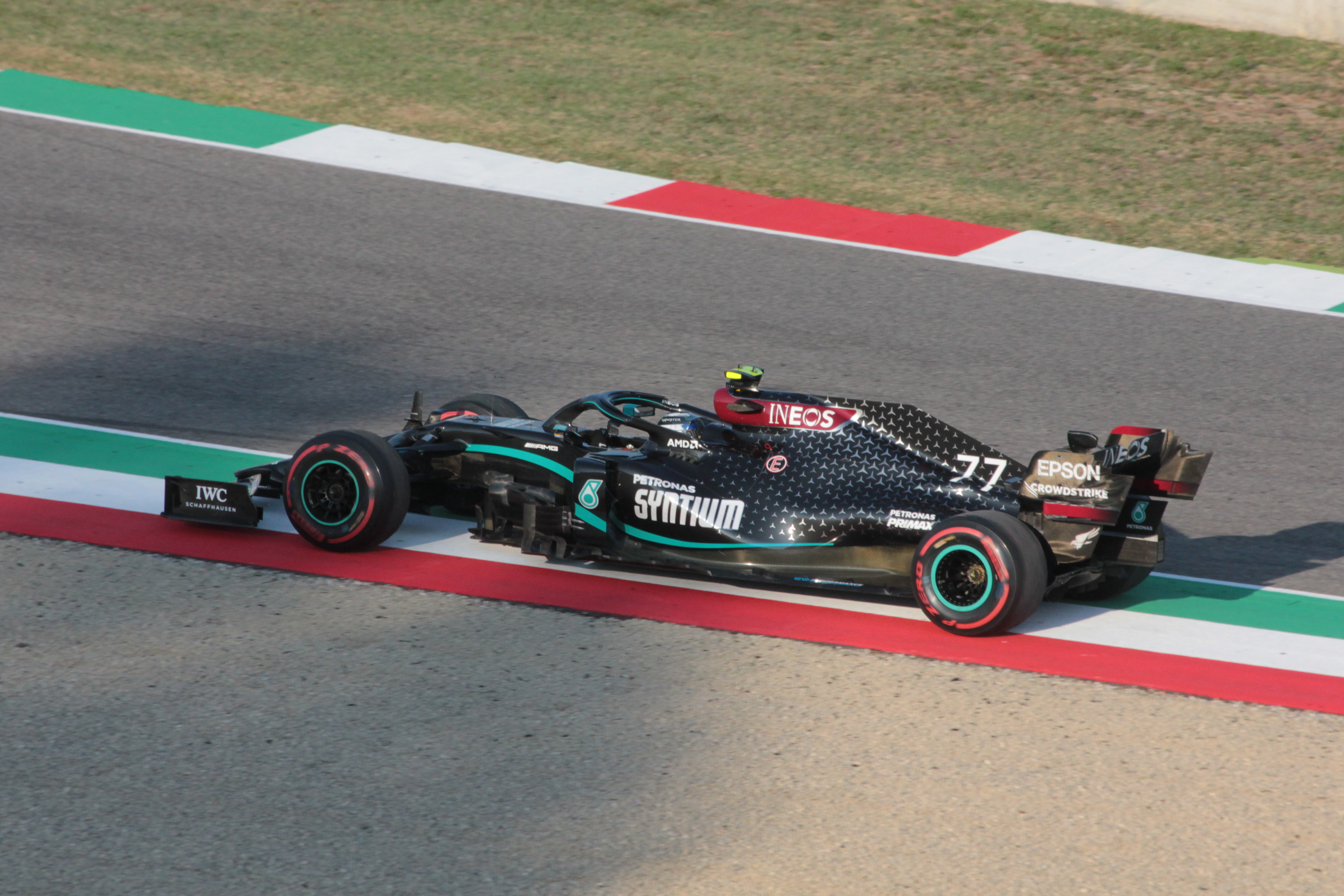
Mercedes secured their seventh consecutive Constructors' Championship.

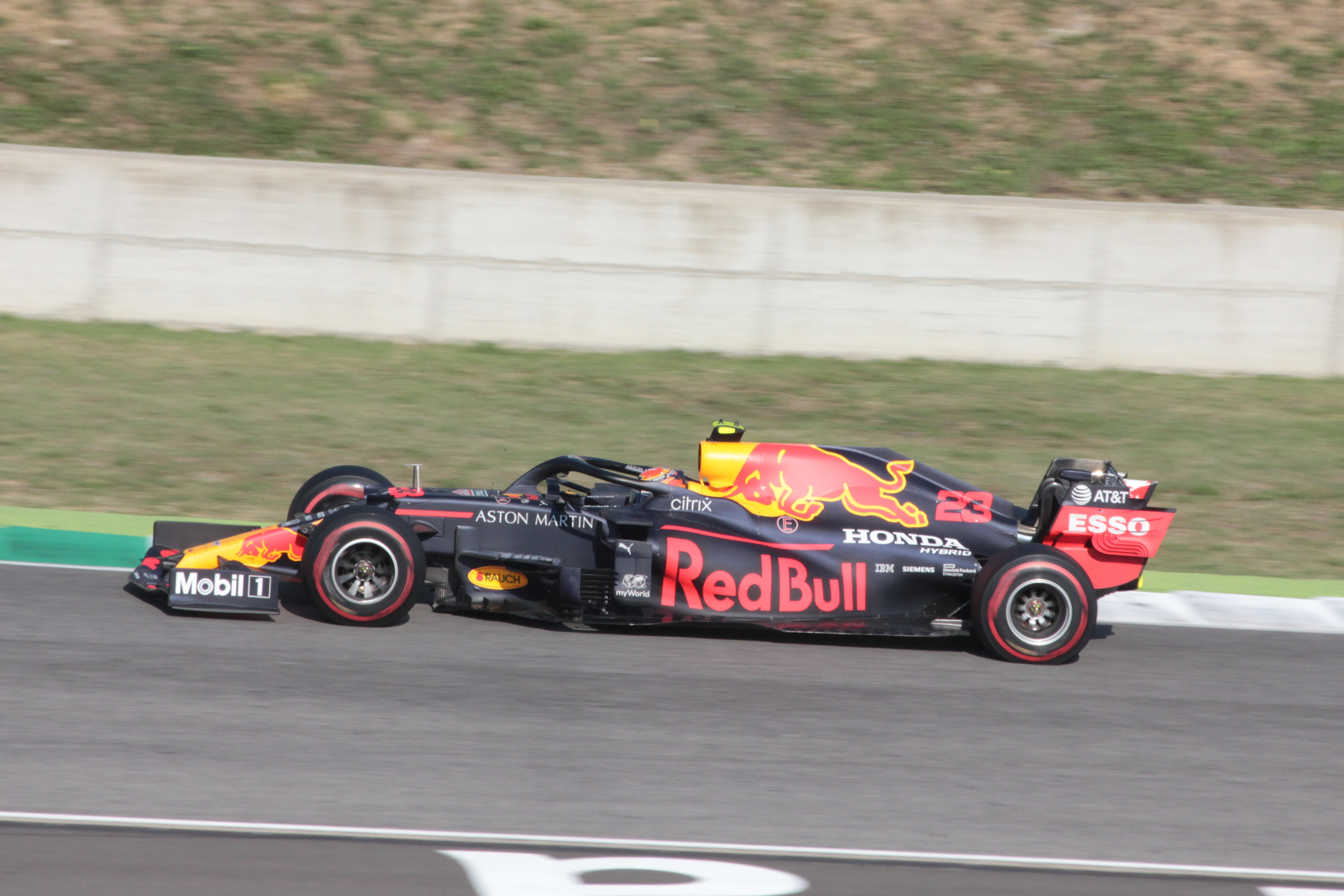
Red Bull finished second in the Constructors' Championship.

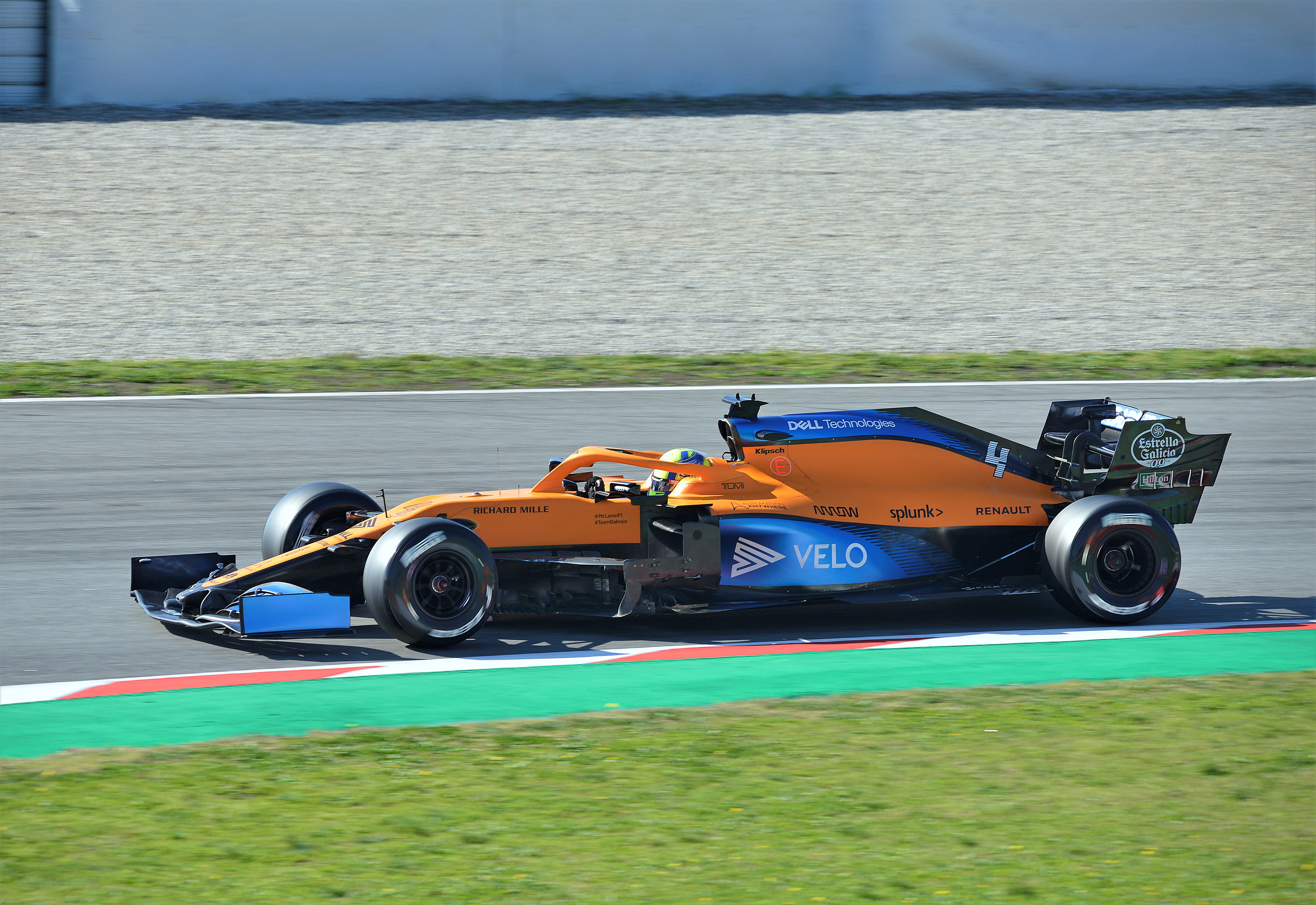
McLaren finished third, their best result since 2012.

The 2020 FIA Formula One World Championship was the motor racing championship for Formula One cars which was the 71st running of the Formula One World Championship. It marked the 70th anniversary of the first Formula One World Drivers' Championship. The championship was recognised by the governing body of international motorsport, the Fédération Internationale de l'Automobile (FIA), as the highest class of competition for open-wheel racing cars. Drivers and teams competed for the titles of World Drivers' Champion and World Constructors' Champion, respectively.

The championship was originally due to start in March, but the start was postponed until July in response to the COVID-19 pandemic. The season was originally due to be contested over a record of 22 Grands Prix, but as some races were cancelled and new races were added to replace them, a total of 17 races were run. The season started in July with the Austrian Grand Prix and ended in December with the Abu Dhabi Grand Prix. Due to the COVID-19 pandemic, the first eight rounds of the championship were run behind closed doors, with the rest of the races being run at a reduced capacity or also behind closed doors due to the second wave of the COVID-19 pandemic.

Lewis Hamilton and Mercedes entered the season as the reigning World Drivers' and World Constructors' champions, respectively, after they both won their sixth championship in 2019. At the Emilia Romagna Grand Prix, Mercedes secured their seventh consecutive Constructors' Championship making them the only team to win seven consecutive championships, breaking Ferrari's record from 1999 to 2004. Mercedes also maintained the distinction of being the only team to win the championship since the 2014 turbo-hybrid engine regulation changes were enacted. Hamilton equalled Michael Schumacher's record of seven World Drivers' Championships at the Turkish Grand Prix and broke Schumacher's previous record of 91 career wins at the Portuguese Grand Prix.

Sebastian Vettel endured a difficult season with Ferrari, finishing thirteenth in the standings and amassing only 33 points with one podium finish (third in Turkey). This would also be his final season with Ferrari, as he would go on to join Aston Martin—the rebrand of Racing Point—for the 2021 season, where he would spend two seasons before retiring from F1 at the end of 2022 season. Ferrari finished outside of the top five in the Constructors' standings for the first time since 1980.

The 2020 season remains the last time the World Drivers' Championship title won by a full-factory team driver until Andrea Kimi Antonelli won in 2026 season.

== Entries ==
Each team was required to enter at least two drivers, one for each of the two mandatory cars. All teams competed with tyres supplied by Pirelli.

Teams and drivers that competed in the 2020 World Championship
Entrant	Constructor	Chassis	Power unit	Race drivers		
Entrant	Constructor	Chassis	Power unit	No.	Driver name	Rounds
(Switzerland) Alfa Romeo Racing Orlen	Alfa Romeo Racing-Ferrari	C39	Ferrari 065	7; 99	(Finland) Kimi Räikkönen (Italy) Antonio Giovinazzi	All; All
(Italy) Scuderia AlphaTauri Honda	AlphaTauri-Honda	AT01	Honda RA620H	10; 26	(France) Pierre Gasly (Russia) Daniil Kvyat	All; All
(Italy) Scuderia Ferrari	Ferrari	SF1000	Ferrari 065	5; 16	(Germany) Sebastian Vettel (Monaco) Charles Leclerc	All; All
(United States) Haas F1 Team	Haas-Ferrari	VF-20	Ferrari 065	8; 51; 20	(France) Romain Grosjean (Brazil) Pietro Fittipaldi (Denmark) Kevin Magnussen	1–15; 16–17; All
(United Kingdom) McLaren F1 Team	McLaren-Renault	MCL35	Renault E-Tech 20	4; 55	(United Kingdom) Lando Norris (Spain) Carlos Sainz Jr.	All; All
(Germany) Mercedes-AMG Petronas F1 Team	Mercedes	F1 W11	Mercedes-AMG F1 M11	44; 63; 77	(United Kingdom) Lewis Hamilton (United Kingdom) George Russell (Finland) Valtteri Bottas	1–15, 17; 16; All
(United Kingdom) BWT Racing Point F1 Team	Racing Point-BWT Mercedes	RP20	BWT Mercedes (Note: Racing Point F1 Team used Mercedes-AMG F1 M11 power units. For sponsorship purposes, these engines were rebadged as "BWT Mercedes".)	11; 27; 18; 27	(Mexico) Sergio Pérez (Germany) Nico Hülkenberg (Canada) Lance Stroll (Germany) Nico Hülkenberg (Note: When Hülkenberg raced for Racing Point for the 2020 Eifel Grand Prix, he drove the car that was previously entered for Lance Stroll, rather than the car he had driven in the fourth and fifth rounds.)	1–4, 6–17 (Note: Pérez was entered into the 2020 British Grand Prix, but later withdrew after testing positive for the coronavirus.); 4–5; All (Note: Stroll was entered into the 2020 Eifel Grand Prix, but later withdrew after feeling unwell and testing positive for the coronavirus on the day of the race.); 11
(Austria) Aston Martin Red Bull Racing Honda	Red Bull Racing-Honda	RB16	Honda RA620H	23; 33	(Thailand) Alexander Albon (Netherlands) Max Verstappen	All; All
(France) Renault DP World F1 Team	Renault	R.S.20	Renault E-Tech 20	3; 31	(Australia) Daniel Ricciardo (France) Esteban Ocon	All; All
(United Kingdom) Williams Racing (Note: Williams entered pre-season testing as "ROKiT Williams Racing".)	Williams-Mercedes	FW43	Mercedes-AMG F1 M11	6; 63; 89	(Canada) Nicholas Latifi (United Kingdom) George Russell (United Kingdom) Jack Aitken	All; 1–15, 17; 16

=== Free practice drivers ===
Across the season, four drivers drove as a test or third driver in free practice sessions. Jack Aitken and Roy Nissany both drove for Williams at one and three Grands Prix, respectively, Robert Kubica drove for Alfa Romeo Racing at five Grands Prix and Mick Schumacher drove for Haas at one Grand Prix.

Schumacher and Callum Ilott were entered to appear in the first practice session for the Eifel Grand Prix, driving for Alfa Romeo Racing and Haas, respectively, but the session was cancelled due to bad weather conditions.

Drivers that took part in first or second free practice sessions
Constructor	Practice drivers		
Constructor	No.	Driver name	Rounds
Alfa Romeo Racing-Ferrari	88; 37	(Poland) Robert Kubica (Germany) Mick Schumacher	2–3, 5, 15, 17; 11
Haas-Ferrari	50	(Great Britain) Callum Ilott (Germany) Mick Schumacher	11; 17
Williams-Mercedes	40	(Great Britain) Jack Aitken (Israel) Roy Nissany	2; 6, 8, 15

=== Team changes ===
Red Bull GmbH, the parent company of Red Bull Racing and Scuderia Toro Rosso, renamed Toro Rosso as "Scuderia AlphaTauri". The team uses the constructor name "AlphaTauri". The name is derived from Red Bull's AlphaTauri fashion brand.

=== Driver changes ===
After a year's absence, Esteban Ocon returned to racing in Formula One after signing a contract with Renault, replacing Nico Hülkenberg. Robert Kubica left Williams at the end of the 2019 championship and joined Alfa Romeo Racing as a reserve driver. Nicholas Latifi, the 2019 Formula 2 Championship runner-up, replaced Kubica at Williams.

==== Mid-season changes ====
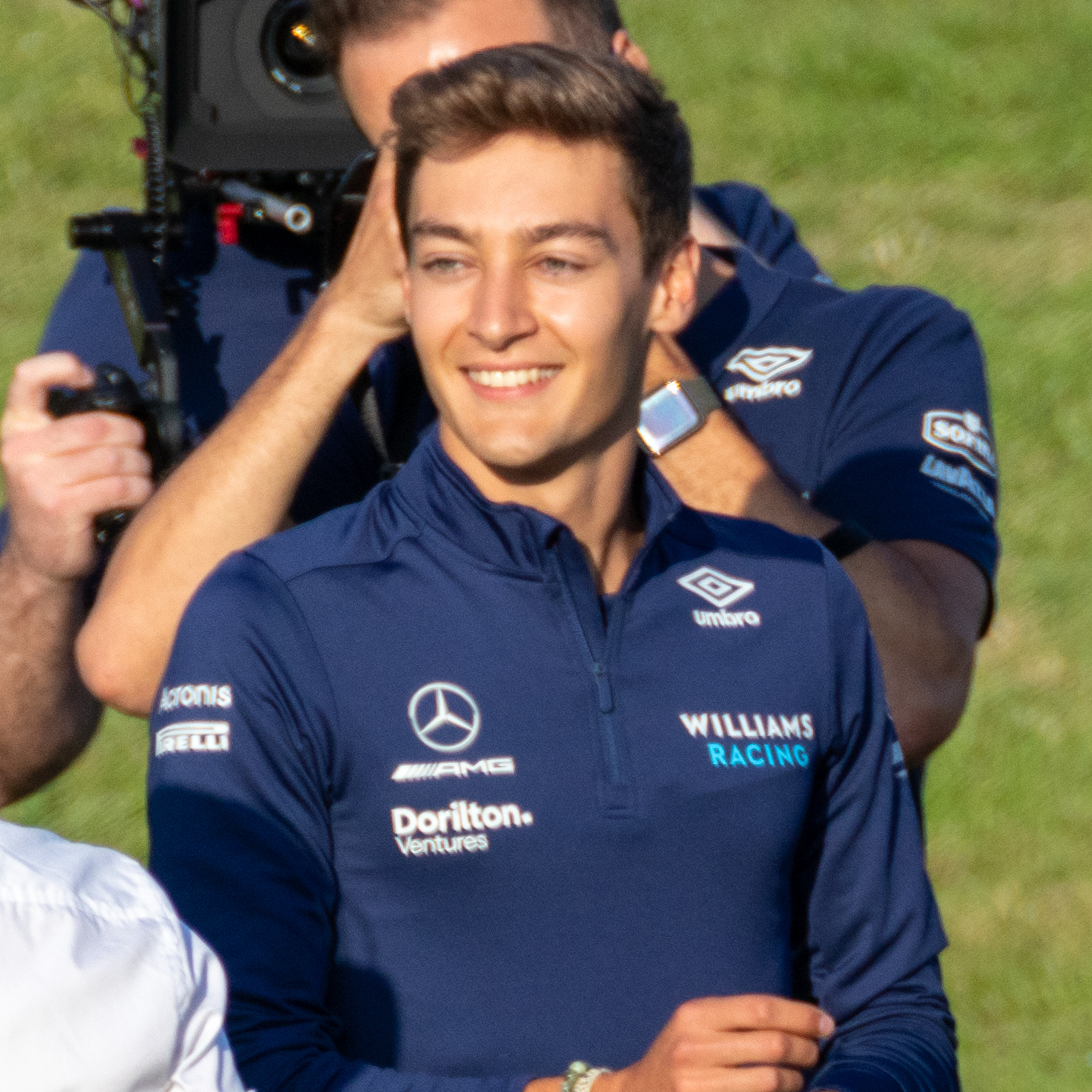
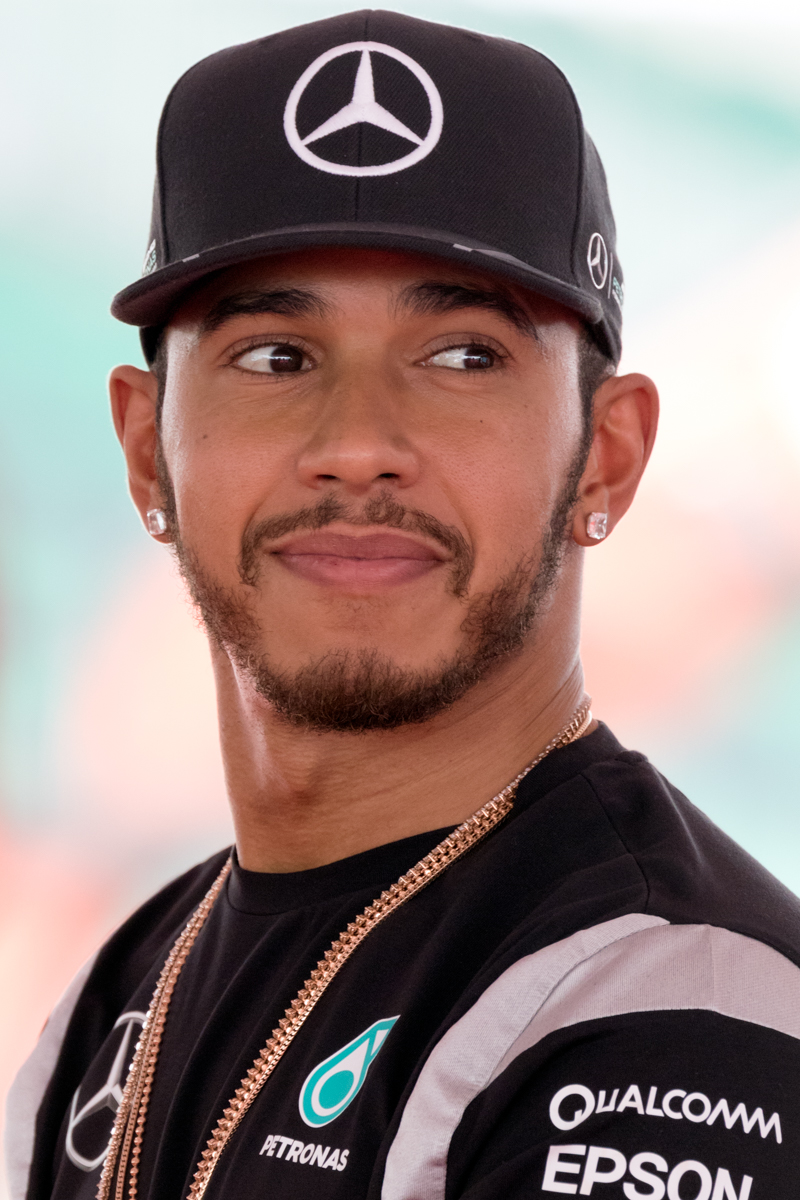
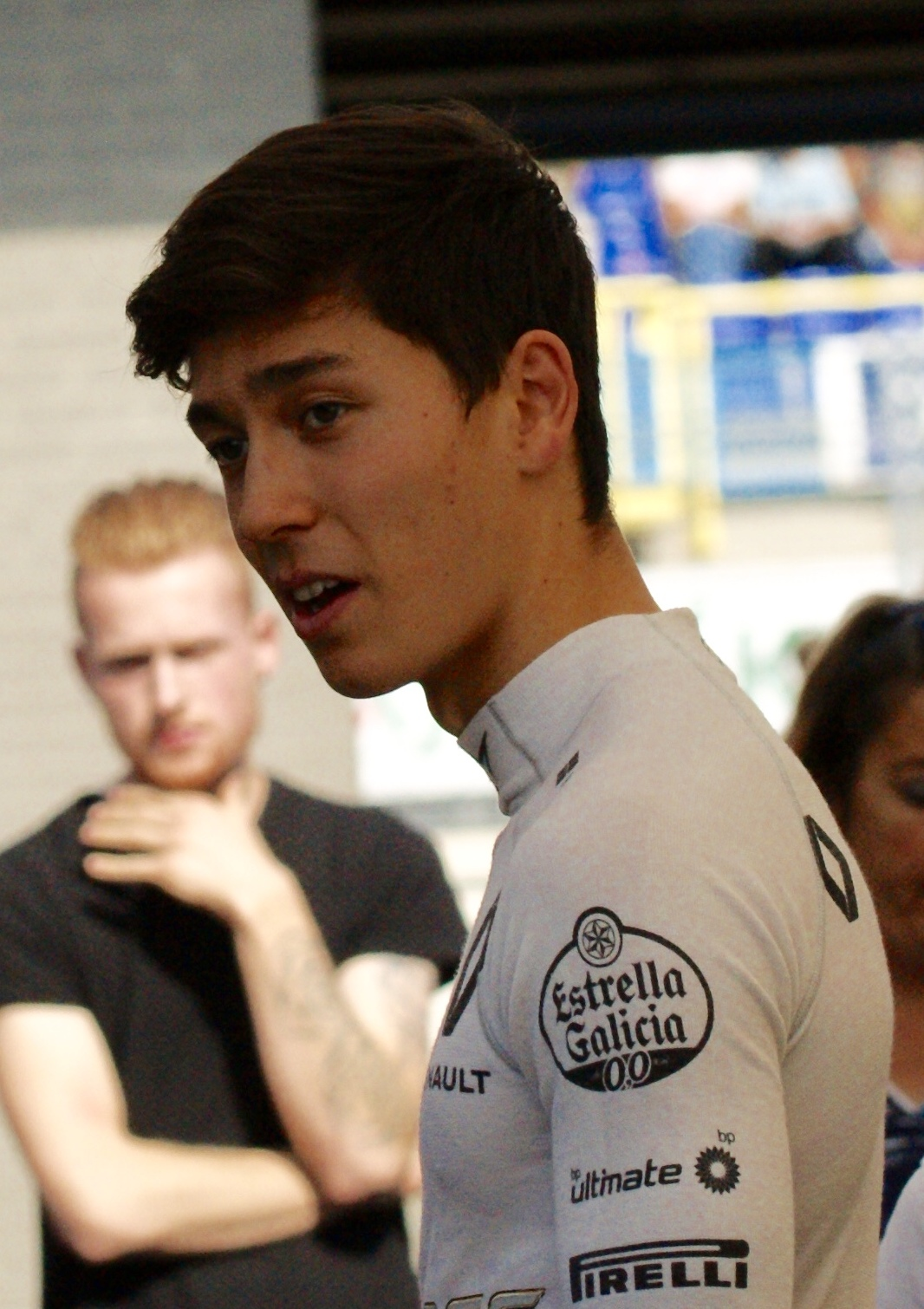
George Russell (left) substituted for Lewis Hamilton (centre) at Mercedes for the Sakhir Grand Prix after the latter tested positive for COVID-19. Jack Aitken (right) then substituted for Russell at Williams.

A day before the British Grand Prix weekend, Racing Point driver Sergio Pérez tested positive for COVID-19 and was ruled out of the race weekend. After seeking clarification from Public Health England, Racing Point stated that they intended to let Pérez race in the 70th Anniversary Grand Prix pending a negative coronavirus test. This re-test came back positive and so Pérez was also unable to take part in the 70th Anniversary Grand Prix. He was replaced for both races by Nico Hülkenberg, who had raced for the team's predecessor Force India in 2012 and from 2014 to 2016, and last raced in Formula One at the 2019 Abu Dhabi Grand Prix. Pérez had a negative coronavirus test result the week preceding the Spanish Grand Prix weekend and he competed in the Grand Prix having been cleared by the FIA to return. Pérez's Racing Point teammate Lance Stroll felt ill prior to the Eifel Grand Prix and tested positive for the coronavirus on the day of the race. Hülkenberg again raced for the team.

After Romain Grosjean suffered burns to his hands following a crash at the Bahrain Grand Prix, Haas promoted test driver Pietro Fittipaldi to make his debut at the Sakhir Grand Prix. Grosjean also missed the Abu Dhabi Grand Prix because of his recovery after the crash in Bahrain; Fittipaldi raced again for the team. Lewis Hamilton tested positive for the coronavirus prior to the Sakhir Grand Prix and was forced to sit out. He was replaced by George Russell, with Jack Aitken replacing Russell at Williams. Hamilton returned to Mercedes for the season-ending Abu Dhabi Grand Prix, after testing negative for the coronavirus, with Russell returning to Williams.

== Calendar ==
Twenty-two Grands Prix were originally scheduled for the 2020 World Championship. However, the COVID-19 pandemic resulted in numerous race cancellations and postponements. A rescheduled calendar consisted of seventeen Grands Prix, nine from the original 2020 calendar and eight other Grands Prix, while the other thirteen original 2020 races were cancelled. This also meant that the season started with two races in Austria, and later on in the season there were also two races at Silverstone Circuit along with two races at Bahrain International Circuit. Each race is the minimum number of laps that exceeds a total distance of 305 km (189.5 mi). Under the sporting regulations, a minimum of eight races must take place for the season to be considered a championship. (Note: Under the FIA's International Sporting Code, a season must contest races across three continents to be considered a World Championship. To ensure a championship was officially completed the FIA decided to waive the requirement in the International Sporting Code for any series under the FIA's control to race on least three continents to be classed as World Championship.) As a result of the cancellations and changes, no round was held in North America for the first time since 2009 and no round was held in the Americas for the first time since the championship's inception in 1950.

Schedule of events
Round	Grand Prix	Circuit	Date
1	Austrian Grand Prix	(Austria) Red Bull Ring, Spielberg	5 July
2	Styrian Grand Prix	(Austria) Red Bull Ring, Spielberg	12 July
3	Hungarian Grand Prix	(Hungary) Hungaroring, Mogyoród	19 July (Note: The Hungarian Grand Prix was originally due to take place on 2 August, but was rescheduled due to the COVID-19 pandemic, replacing the British Grand Prix race date.)
4	British Grand Prix	(United Kingdom) Silverstone Circuit, Silverstone	2 August (Note: The British Grand Prix was originally due to take place on 19 July, but was rescheduled due to the COVID-19 pandemic, replacing the Hungarian Grand Prix race date.)
5	70th Anniversary Grand Prix	(United Kingdom) Silverstone Circuit, Silverstone	9 August
6	Spanish Grand Prix	(Spain) Circuit de Barcelona-Catalunya, Montmeló	16 August (Note: The Spanish Grand Prix was originally due to take place on 10 May, but was rescheduled due to the COVID-19 pandemic.)
7	Belgian Grand Prix	(Belgium) Circuit de Spa-Francorchamps, Stavelot	30 August
8	Italian Grand Prix	(Italy) Autodromo Nazionale di Monza, Monza	6 September
9	Tuscan Grand Prix	(Italy) Autodromo Internazionale del Mugello, Scarperia e San Piero	13 September
10	Russian Grand Prix	(Russia) Sochi Autodrom, Sochi	27 September
11	Eifel Grand Prix	(Germany) Nürburgring, Nürburg	11 October
12	Portuguese Grand Prix	(Portugal) Autódromo Internacional do Algarve, Portimão	25 October
13	Emilia Romagna Grand Prix	(Italy) Autodromo Internazionale Enzo e Dino Ferrari, Imola	1 November
14	Turkish Grand Prix	(Turkey) Istanbul Park, Tuzla	15 November
15	Bahrain Grand Prix	Bahrain International Circuit, Sakhir (Note: The Bahrain Grand Prix was run using the traditional layout called the "Grand Prix Circuit", while the Sakhir Grand Prix was run using a different layout called the "Outer Circuit".)	29 November (Note: The Bahrain Grand Prix was originally due to take place on 22 March, but was rescheduled due to the COVID-19 pandemic, replacing the Abu Dhabi Grand Prix race date.)
16	Sakhir Grand Prix	Bahrain International Circuit, Sakhir	6 December
17	Abu Dhabi Grand Prix	(United Arab Emirates) Yas Marina Circuit, Abu Dhabi	13 December (Note: The Abu Dhabi Grand Prix was originally due to take place on 29 November, but was rescheduled due to the COVID-19 pandemic.)

=== Cancelled Grands Prix ===
The following rounds were included on the original calendar published by the World Motor Sport Council but were cancelled in response to the COVID-19 pandemic:

Grand Prix	Circuit	Scheduled date
Australian Grand Prix	(Australia) Albert Park Circuit, Melbourne	15 March
Vietnamese Grand Prix	(Vietnam) Hanoi Circuit, Hanoi	5 April
Chinese Grand Prix	(China) Shanghai International Circuit, Shanghai	19 April
Dutch Grand Prix	(Netherlands) Circuit Zandvoort, Zandvoort	3 May
Monaco Grand Prix	Circuit de Monaco, Monte Carlo	24 May
Azerbaijan Grand Prix	(Azerbaijan) Baku City Circuit, Baku	7 June
Canadian Grand Prix	(Canada) Circuit Gilles Villeneuve, Montreal	14 June
French Grand Prix	(France) Circuit Paul Ricard, Le Castellet	28 June
Singapore Grand Prix	Marina Bay Street Circuit, Singapore	20 September
Japanese Grand Prix	(Japan) Suzuka International Racing Course, Suzuka	11 October
United States Grand Prix	(United States) Circuit of the Americas, Austin, Texas	25 October
Mexico City Grand Prix	Autódromo Hermanos Rodríguez, Mexico City	1 November
Brazilian Grand Prix	(Brazil) Autódromo José Carlos Pace, São Paulo	15 November

=== Changes from the 2019 calendar to the original 2020 calendar ===
After purchasing the commercial rights to the sport from CVC Capital Partners in January 2017, Liberty Media announced plans to expand the Formula One calendar using a concept they termed "destination races" and modelled on the Singapore Grand Prix. Under the "destination races" model, Grands Prix would be established in or near key tourist destinations and integrate racing, entertainment and social functions. Several countries and venues announced plans to bid for a Grand Prix, with two bids being successful:

- The Vietnamese Grand Prix was announced as the first new race created under Liberty's management. The race was given a provisional date of April 2020 and was planned to take place in the capital Hanoi on the Hanoi Circuit, but was later cancelled.
- The Dutch Grand Prix was due to be revived, with the race scheduled to take place at the Circuit Zandvoort. The 2020 race would have marked the first time the Dutch Grand Prix has been run since 1985. However, the race was later cancelled.

Liberty Media initially expected that the 2020 calendar would consist of twenty-one Grands Prix and that any new races would come at the expense of existing events, but later negotiated an agreement with the teams to allow up to twenty-two Grands Prix. Several further changes were made between the 2019 and 2020 calendars, with the German Grand Prix discontinued and the Mexican Grand Prix planned to be rebranded as the Mexico City Grand Prix before it was cancelled.

== Regulation changes ==
=== Sporting regulations ===
Teams were allowed to use an additional MGU-K compared to 2019 to compensate for the increased demands of contesting the originally planned twenty-two races.

Drivers who participated in free practice sessions were eligible for additional FIA Super Licence points. Any driver who completed a minimum 100 km (62 mi) during a free practice session received an additional Super Licence point on the condition that they do not commit a driving infraction. Drivers could only accrue ten Super Licence points across a three-season period from free practice sessions. The rules around helmet designs were relaxed with drivers allowed to change their design as many times as they wanted between races, having previously been restricted to a base design and one permitted major design change (excluding minor alterations) since 2015.

As a result of what was then planned to be an expanded calendar, the two pre-season tests which took place at Circuit de Barcelona-Catalunya were reduced in length from four days to three days each, whilst the two in-season tests that took place at Bahrain International Circuit and Circuit de Barcelona-Catalunya in 2019 were discontinued. Teams were no longer allowed to hide their cars during testing. The amount of time in which car mechanics were prohibited from working on the car was extended from eight to nine hours.

The rules surrounding jump starts and the weighbridge were relaxed with the race stewards able to hand out less severe punishments for missing the weighbridge and jump starts.

=== Technical regulations ===
In order to reduce the risk of punctures, the last 50 mm (2.0 in) of the front wing could no longer contain any metal. Brake ducts could no longer be outsourced and must be made and designed by the team. The amount of fuel that could be outside of the fuel tank was reduced from 2 litres (3.5 imp pt) to 250 millilitres (0.44 imp pt). A decrease in electronic driver aids meant that drivers were responsible for managing more of the car's torque during race starts.

==== Mid-season changes ====
From the Italian Grand Prix, drivers were only allowed to run one engine mode from the start of qualifying to the end of the race. However, drivers were still allowed to use electrical power for the powertrain throughout the race weekend.

== Impact of the COVID-19 pandemic ==
=== Initial response ===
The season was heavily disrupted by the COVID-19 pandemic, with an announcement prior to the start of the championship that the Chinese Grand Prix would be postponed due to the early COVID-19 outbreak in the country.

Italian-based teams Ferrari and AlphaTauri expressed concern about the spread of the disease and its effect on the championship. As Italy suffered one of the worst outbreaks of the virus, both teams were concerned about the ability of their staff to leave the quarantine zone established in northern Italy and to enter host nations. Pre-season testing in Barcelona proceeded as planned, with all teams and drivers completing the six days of testing.

Ross Brawn, the managing director of the sport, announced that Grands Prix would not go ahead if a team were blocked from entering a host nation, but that events could go ahead if a team voluntarily chose not to enter a host nation. In early March, organisers of the Bahrain Grand Prix stated that the event would be "participants-only" and that no spectators would be allowed.

=== Race postponements and cancellations ===
The season-opening Australian Grand Prix was expected to go ahead and all teams and drivers arrived at the venue as planned. Three days before the race was due to take place, McLaren announced their withdrawal from the event after a team member tested positive for the virus. This led to the Grand Prix being cancelled altogether the following morning. Later that day, it was announced that the Bahrain Grand Prix would be postponed rather than closed to spectators, as would the inaugural Vietnamese Grand Prix.

Formula One and the FIA released a joint statement saying that they "expect to begin the Championship in Europe at the end of May" but that this timeline "will be regularly reviewed". On 19 March, the FIA announced that the Dutch, Spanish and Monaco Grands Prix had all been postponed indefinitely due to the pandemic. In the statement, the FIA said they now expect to begin the season "as soon as it is safe to do so after May" and that the situation would continue to be monitored. The organisers of the Monaco race, Automobile Club de Monaco, clarified that the race had been cancelled. This meant that Formula One would not race in Monaco for the first time since 1954. Four days later, organisers of the Azerbaijan Grand Prix announced that the race had been postponed.

In early April, organisers of the Canadian Grand Prix announced the race's postponement. Later in the month, the French Grand Prix organisers confirmed that the race would not be held in 2020, and the managing director of Silverstone Circuit stated that should the British Grand Prix go ahead, it would be without spectators. In May, organisers of the Hungarian Grand Prix announced that their race would use the same model. The sport's plans to resume competition called for a ban on team motorhomes and a rigid testing regime to stop any outbreak of the virus.

The Dutch Grand Prix was cancelled entirely in late May, with organisers of the event stating that they would prefer to host the revived race with spectators in attendance in 2021 rather than without spectators in 2020. Formula One confirmed the cancellation of the Azerbaijan, Singapore and Japanese Grands Prix in June. Organisers of the Azerbaijan and Singapore races cited the difficulty of assembling the infrastructure required for a street circuit as the reason for their cancellation, while the Japanese Grand Prix was cancelled because of the Japanese government's travel restrictions. In July the Brazilian, Canadian, Mexico City and United States Grands Prix were formally cancelled amidst rising virus cases and travel restrictions in the Americas. However, organisers of the Brazilian Grand Prix disputed the claims of Formula One Management and were unhappy with their race being cancelled without further consultation. In August the cancellation of the Chinese Grand Prix was announced, followed, in October, by the cancellation of the inaugural Vietnamese Grand Prix.

The annual summer break, where factories shut down for two weeks, was brought forward from August to March and April. Teams nominated a three-week period to close with the aim of making room for races later in the year. At the end of March, it was announced that for the first time the factory shut-down would additionally apply to power unit manufacturers. The factory shut-down period was later extended to a total of nine weeks for competitors and seven weeks for power unit manufacturers.

=== Rescheduled calendar ===
In March, teams agreed that the 2020 Championship could run into early 2021 to ensure the running of as many races as possible. Such a move would also ensure that eight Grands Prix could be held, over three different continents, thereby meeting the minimum number of races needed for the season to qualify as a World Championship.

In early April, Ross Brawn suggested that a rescheduled calendar of 18 or 19 races would be possible should racing begin in July, and that the opening round "is most likely to be in Europe", potentially without spectators. He also raised the possibility of Grand Prix events being reduced to two days in order to ease pressure on logistical operations. However, Alfa Romeo Racing managing director Frédéric Vasseur cautioned that a condensed calendar could escalate the costs of competing and put smaller teams at risk of financial collapse. This was reiterated by other teams, who pointed out that the race sanctioning fees paid by event organisers contributed to the prize money awarded to all teams at the end of the year. This money is awarded proportionally based on the teams' World Constructors' Championship positions and forms a significant part of a team's budget for the upcoming year. With fewer races and the prize structure remaining fixed, teams were concerned that they would suffer a significant financial loss.

In a statement in late April, Formula One CEO Chase Carey declared the intention to begin the season on 5 July and a target to hold between 15 and 18 races overall. In June, the first eight races of a rescheduled calendar were confirmed, with the season expected to begin on 5 July with the Austrian Grand Prix. This revised calendar included two newly named one-off events—both second races at the Red Bull Ring and Silverstone—known as the Styrian and the 70th Anniversary Grands Prix, respectively. Ross Brawn announced that the eight-round calendar was expected to grow and that the sport was considering races at venues that were not on the original calendar or using multiple configurations of existing circuits to achieve the goal of fifteen Grands Prix.

On 10 July, the Russian Grand Prix was re-added to the calendar on its originally scheduled date, and the first Tuscan Grand Prix was announced at the Mugello Circuit, the first time the circuit would host a Formula One World Championship race. Later in July, the return of the Nürburgring (Note: All Formula One Grands Prix held at the Nürburgring since 1984 have used the 5-kilometre-long (3.1 mi) GP-Strecke and not the 21-kilometre-long (13 mi) Nordschleife, which was last used by Formula One in 1976.) and the Autodromo Internazionale Enzo e Dino Ferrari in Imola to the calendar was revealed, along with the debut of the Algarve International Circuit. These races were named the Eifel and Emilia Romagna Grands Prix, respectively, with the return of the Portuguese Grand Prix for the first time since the 1996 season. The Emilia Romagna Grand Prix took place over a shortened two-day weekend, with a single 90 minute practice session taking place on Saturday morning. This marks the first race at the Nürburgring since 2013 and at Imola since 2006, and also the first time that a country (Italy), hosts three Grands Prix since the 1982 season. (Note: Italy hosted three Grands Prix at Monza, Mugello and Imola. In 1982 the United States held three Grands Prix in Long Beach, Detroit and Las Vegas.)

In August, it was announced that Formula One would return to Istanbul Park for the first Turkish Grand Prix since the 2011 season, together with the debut of the Sakhir Grand Prix, to be held at the Bahrain International Circuit, using the configuration of the track called "Outer Circuit". They join the rescheduled Bahrain and Abu Dhabi Grands Prix as the final four races of the season, bringing the calendar to seventeen races.

Of the races and dates on the original calendar, only four races, the Austrian, Belgian, Italian and Russian Grands Prix kept their original dates.

=== Regulatory changes ===
The pandemic required changes to the format of a race weekend, which included abandoning the drivers' parade and pre-race assembly for the host venue's national anthem. A modified podium ceremony was planned for after races. The FIA introduced limits to the number of team personnel who could be on the starting grid to prepare cars and changed the cut-off times for cars to leave pit lane to minimise the amount of time team personnel spent on the grid. Tyre supplier Pirelli was also required to provide an identical allocation of tyre compounds to all teams and drivers. Where Pirelli were previously required to announce compounds for a race several weeks in advance, this window was reduced to two weeks, allowing them to respond to anticipated changes to the calendar.

=== Solidarity campaign ===
In June, Formula One launched the We Race As One initiative to fight racism, global inequity and the impact of COVID-19. The initiative used a rainbow logo, with the colours of all ten Formula One teams, also with the #WeRaceAsOne hashtag, and featured prominent We Race As One branding on vehicles (including the safety car) and signage on track. Formula One and several teams launched projects or fundraising efforts in support of the initiative.

== Protests against car legality ==
=== Mercedes ===
Ahead of the season opening Austrian Grand Prix, Red Bull launched a protest against the Mercedes F1 W11's dual axis steering, a system where the driver can adjust the toe of the car by pulling and pushing on the steering wheel. The system was found to be legal for 2020, but it would be banned by the FIA from 2021 onward.

=== Racing Point ===
After the Styrian Grand Prix, Renault launched a protest against the brake ducts of Racing Point's car, the RP20, alleging that Racing Point had copied the brake ducts from the Mercedes F1 W10, the car used in 2019 by Mercedes. Similar protests would be launched after the Hungarian and British Grands Prix with the verdict being published between the British and 70th Anniversary Grands Prix. The ruling concluded that Racing Point had illegally copied the brake ducts of the Mercedes F1 W10 and Racing Point were subsequently penalised by 15 Constructors' Championship points and fined €400,000.

Racing Point, Ferrari, McLaren, Renault and Williams had all indicated an intention to appeal the stewards decision with Racing Point trying to clear their name and Ferrari, McLaren, Williams and Renault appealing for a tougher sanction. Ferrari, Renault and Racing Point confirmed their appeal, while Williams and McLaren pulled out of the appeal. Later, Renault announced their decision to withdraw the appeal against the penalty handed out to Racing Point. The same decision was made by Racing Point and Ferrari before and after the Italian Grand Prix, respectively.

== Season summary ==
=== Opening rounds ===
The delayed season started with five races at three venues.

The first pair of races took place at Red Bull Ring in Spielberg. In the Austrian Grand Prix, Valtteri Bottas, driving for Mercedes, took pole position, ahead of his teammate Lewis Hamilton and Red Bull's Max Verstappen; however, Hamilton was given a three-place grid penalty, since he did not slow sufficiently when yellow flags were waved following a small mistake by Bottas. This promoted Verstappen to second, McLaren driver Lando Norris to third, and Alexander Albon to fourth. In an eventful race, featuring three safety car periods and the retirements of nine drivers, Bottas won, ahead of the Ferrari of Charles Leclerc and Norris. Hamilton crossed the line in second place, but received a five-second time penalty after a collision with Albon, who soon retired; after the penalty was applied, Hamilton finished fourth, ahead of Carlos Sainz Jr., Sergio Pérez and Pierre Gasly.

The temporary format for some rounds featured consecutive races in consecutive weeks at the same venue. This was the case when the series stayed in Spielberg for the Styrian Grand Prix, named for the state where the circuit is located, which was won by Hamilton ahead of Bottas and Verstappen.

The Hungaroring in Mogyoród fielded the first single race meeting of the year, the Hungarian Grand Prix, which started with a slippery track. Verstappen slid into the barrier on his way to the grid and broke his steering axis, but his mechanics managed to repair the car before the race start. The race winner was Hamilton, with Verstappen in second and Bottas in third place.

The next stop was Silverstone, which as another two-in-two format where Hamilton won the first race, the British Grand Prix, despite his left-front tyre delaminating in the middle of the last lap. Verstappen finished second with Leclerc in third. Bottas had a puncture which resulted in him finishing in eleventh. Daniil Kvyat had a puncture at high speed entering Maggotts corner which resulted in a big crash with a safety car, and Sainz Jr. finished 13th after a puncture made him fall from what would have been 4th place. In the second race at Silverstone the next week, the 70th Anniversary Grand Prix, Verstappen won with Hamilton second and Bottas third. This was the first non-Mercedes win of the season.

Formula One then concluded the first part of the season with a single race at Montmeló. The Spanish Grand Prix was won by Hamilton with Verstappen in second and Bottas in third.

=== Mid-season rounds ===
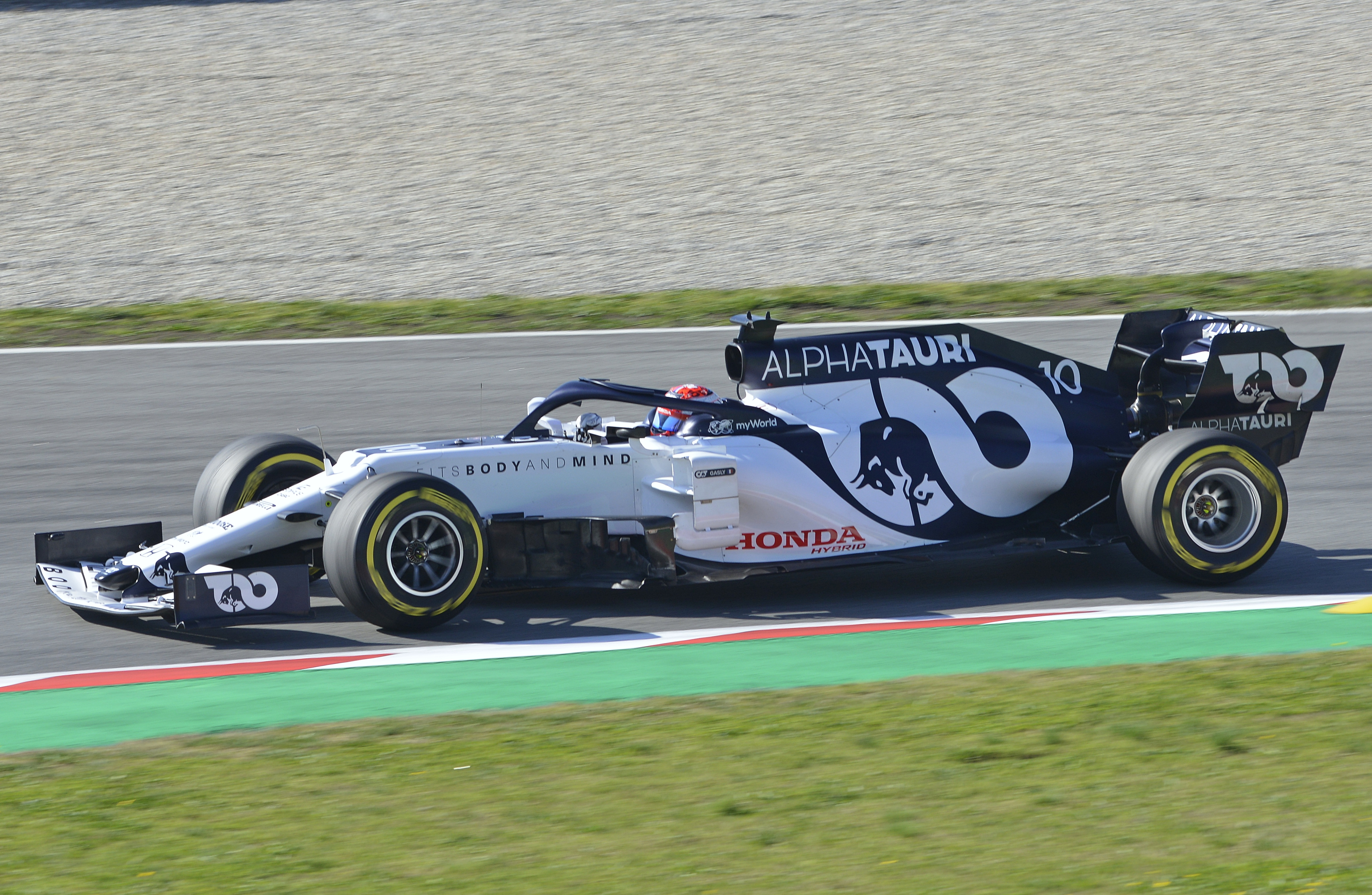
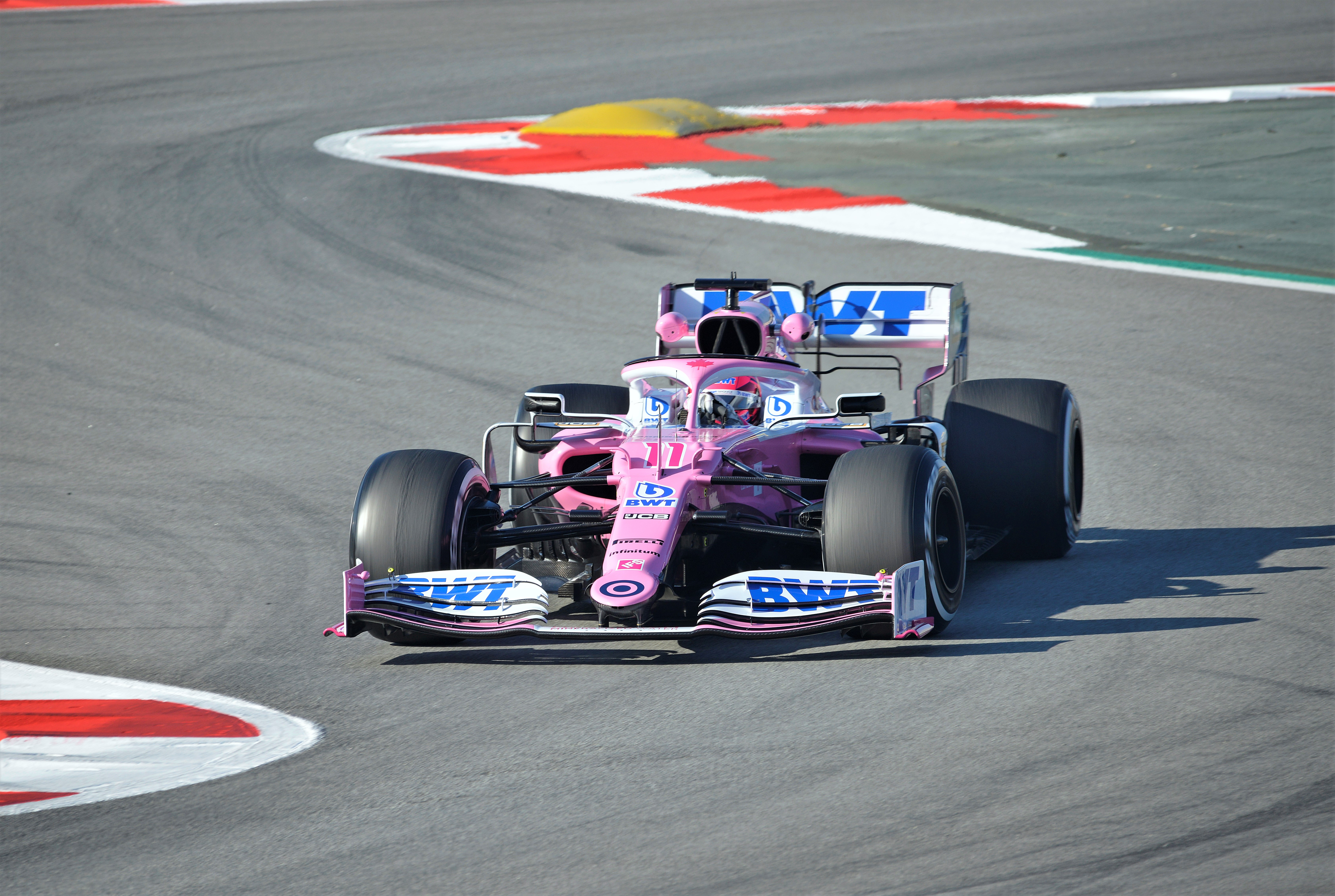
2020 saw maiden F1 race wins for Pierre Gasly (top) and Sergio Pérez (bottom) at the Italian Grand Prix and Sakhir Grand Prix respectively.

The next six races were single rounds at each venue, including two new circuits and a returning circuit. The Belgian Grand Prix was won by Lewis Hamilton, who led every lap and won by 8 seconds over teammate Valtteri Bottas who finished second ahead of Max Verstappen. Daniel Ricciardo finished fourth, setting the fastest lap on the last lap. On lap 11, Antonio Giovinazzi crashed at Campus corner; one of the wheels of his car came loose and hit the front right suspension of George Russell’s car, causing both drivers to retire from the race. This brought out the safety car for three laps. Renault achieved a finish of P4 and P5, equalling their best result since their return to the sport in 2016.

The Italian Grand Prix was won by Pierre Gasly after taking the lead following a red flag caused by Charles Leclerc, and previous leader Hamilton forced to serve a stop-and-go penalty. This was his and AlphaTauri's first race victory. The race marked the first time since Kimi Räikkönen won the 2013 Australian Grand Prix driving for Lotus F1 that the race winner did not drive for Ferrari, Mercedes, or Red Bull and the first time since the 2012 Hungarian Grand Prix that all three constructors failed to score a podium finish. The race marked the second career podium finishes for Carlos Sainz Jr., who finished second, and Lance Stroll, who finished third.

The inaugural Tuscan Grand Prix, Ferrari's 1000th Grand Prix start, resulted in Hamilton's sixth race win of the season, and Mercedes's third 1–2 finish. Bottas overtook Hamilton into turn one before a major collision at turn two caused the retirement of both Verstappen (who had fallen from 3rd to 14th due to a power issue) and Gasly. This brought out the safety car for 8 laps to allow for the debris to be cleared. At the end of the safety car period, a major misunderstanding in the upper midfield led to a large collision down the pit straight, causing the retirement of Nicholas Latifi, Kevin Magnussen, Giovinazzi and Sainz Jr., and a red flag period. At the first restart, Hamilton overtook Bottas and led the race from there onwards. On lap 42, Ricciardo looked poised for his first podium since the 2018 Monaco Grand Prix when Stroll's Racing Point spun off the track due to a puncture, causing the second red flag of the race. This was the first time since the 2016 Brazilian Grand Prix that there were two red flag periods in one race. At the second restart, Hamilton maintained his lead to win the race. Red Bull's Alexander Albon overtook Ricciardo in the closing laps, earning his first ever podium and the first podium for a Thai driver in Formula One.

At the Russian Grand Prix, Hamilton started on pole, but two separate five-second penalties for practice starts outside the designated area meant he finished third; teammate Bottas won the Grand Prix with Verstappen in second.

For the first time since 2013, Formula One returned to the Nürburgring GP-Strecke with the Eifel Grand Prix. Five cars retired in the forms of Russell, Esteban Ocon, Albon, Lando Norris and Bottas, who had started from pole. Hamilton took first place after Bottas locked up into turn 1 on lap 13. Hamilton would go on to win the race, his 7th win this season. Ricciardo claimed his first podium for Renault, finishing the race in third. The race also saw Räikkönen pass the record for most race starts.

At the Portuguese Grand Prix, the first in Portimão, Hamilton took his 92nd win, taking the record for most wins that had been held by Michael Schumacher. Bottas would finish second in the race, twenty-five seconds behind his teammate, with Verstappen finishing third.

=== Closing rounds ===
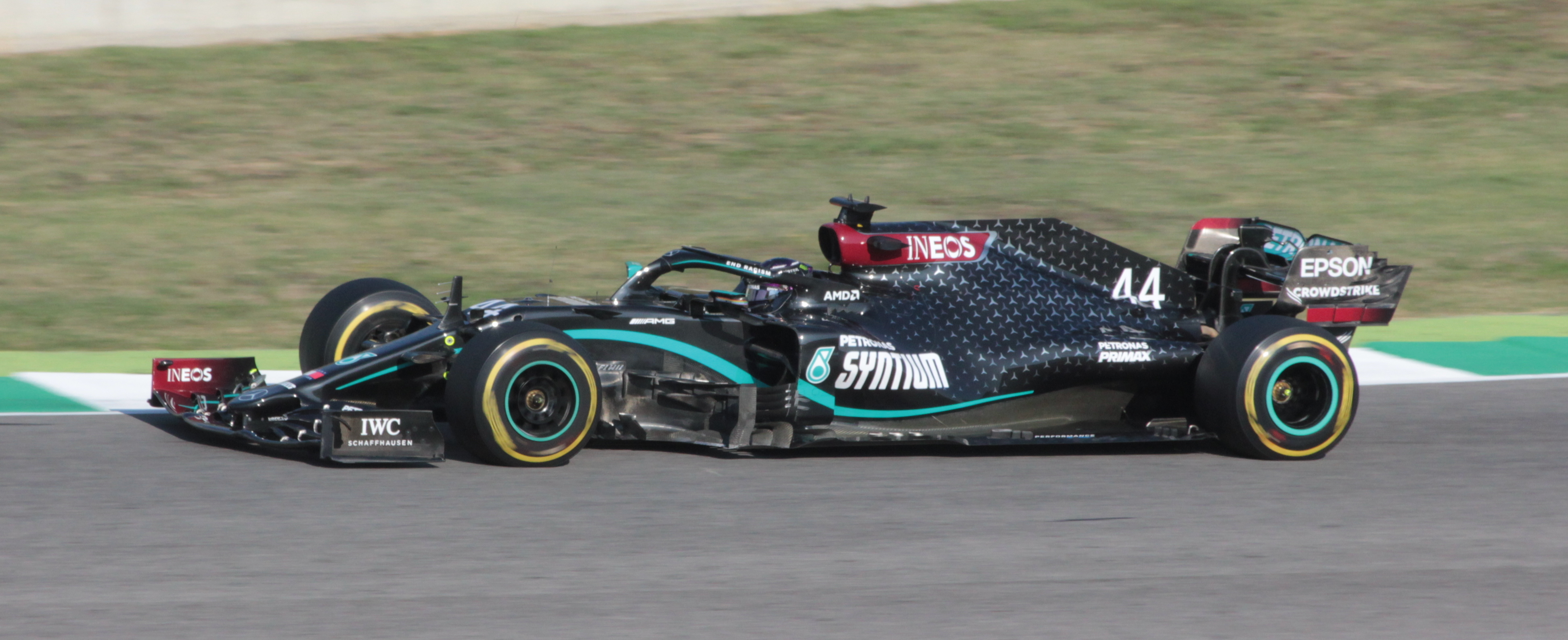
Lewis Hamilton reached 92 career wins by winning the Portuguese Grand Prix, surpassing the record set by Michael Schumacher for most driver wins in Formula One.

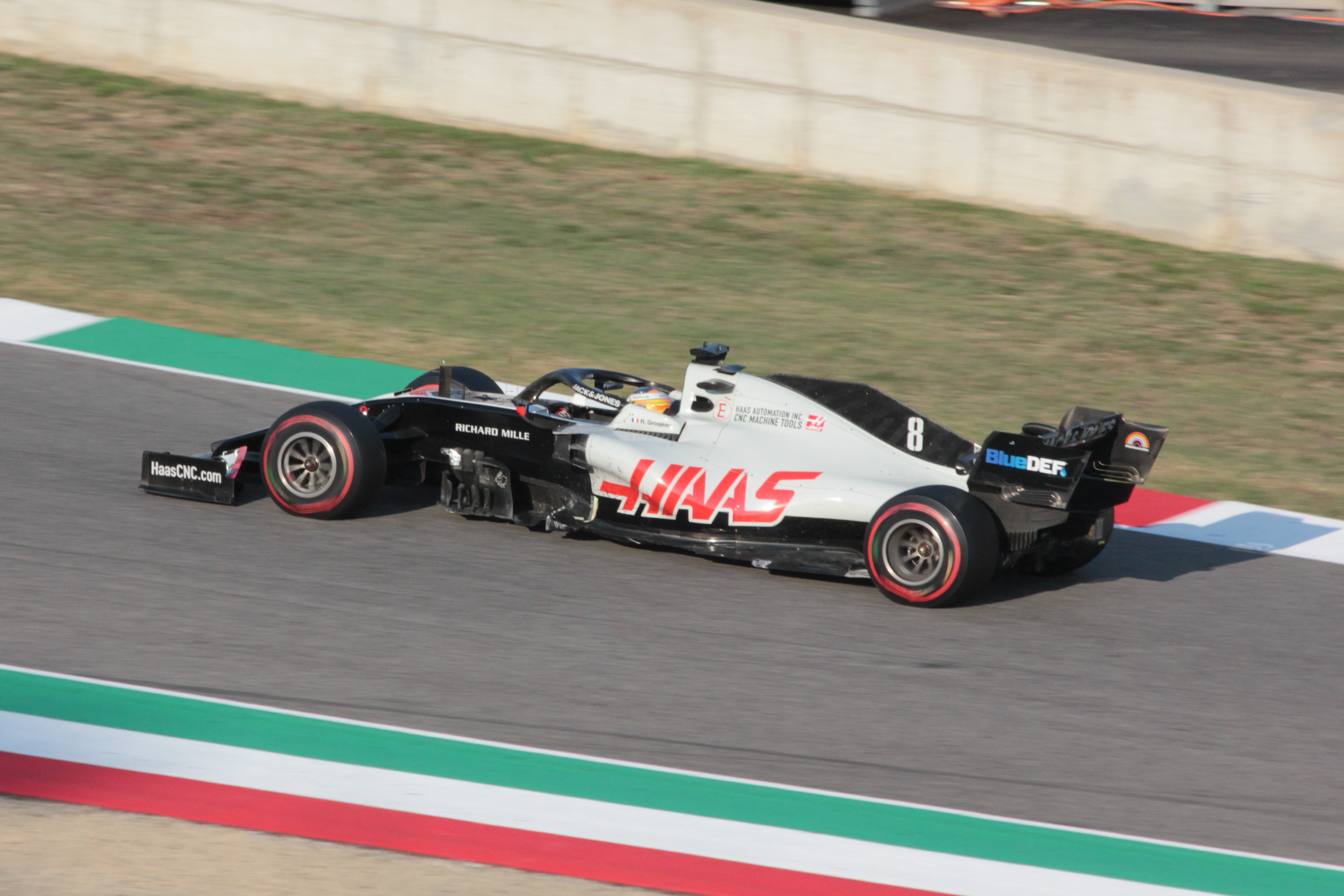
It was Romain Grosjean's last season, having participated in Formula One since 2009.

Formula One returned to the Autodromo Enzo e Dino Ferrari for the 27th time, the first since 2006 with the Emilia Romagna Grand Prix, where Lewis Hamilton won from Valtteri Bottas and Daniel Ricciardo who picked up his second podium of the season. Max Verstappen had a puncture from second, putting him out of the race. Mercedes won their seventh consecutive Constructors' World Championship.

The Turkish Grand Prix saw Hamilton claim his seventh world title with a race win, equalling Michael Schumacher's record for the most Formula One world titles. He finished on the podium with Sergio Pérez and Sebastian Vettel, whilst in qualifying, Lance Stroll claimed his maiden pole position in rainy conditions.

The final two-in-two took place in Sakhir. At the Bahrain Grand Prix, Hamilton claimed his 11th win of the year, followed by Verstappen and Alexander Albon in second and third. The race was marred by a serious accident involving Haas driver Romain Grosjean, who hit a barrier at the start of the race after making contact with the AlphaTauri of Daniil Kvyat. Grosjean's car broke in two and burst into flames as it split the barrier. Numerous safety features allowed him to escape the crash with only burns to the hands, though they would prove severe enough to exclude him from the remainder of the season, it would be Grosjean's final race with Haas after over 9 years in Formula One. Pérez surrendered third place after an engine failure, putting him out of the race, whilst teammate Stroll flipped at the restart after contact with Kvyat.

The second part of the double was run on the outer circuit. Hamilton was ruled out of the Sakhir Grand Prix after testing positive for the coronavirus and was replaced by Williams' George Russell. Russell impressed by taking the lead from new teammate and pole-sitter Bottas and led for 59 laps, before being taken out of contention by first a tyre mix-up by Mercedes and then a late-race puncture, eventually finishing 9th. Despite being dropped to last position through a lap 1 collision with Leclerc and Verstappen, Pérez took his first race victory, followed by Esteban Ocon taking his first podium finish in 2nd and Stroll finishing 3rd. With his win, Pérez took the record for the most race starts before a first victory, with 190 race starts, beating Mark Webber's record of 130 starts before his win at the 2009 German Grand Prix.

At the Abu Dhabi Grand Prix, Hamilton returned for the last race of the season after testing negative for the coronavirus. Verstappen took the pole position and his 10th win in Formula One ahead of Bottas and Hamilton, who finished second and third, respectively. This race was the last for Vettel at Ferrari, after six years, and Pérez at Racing Point, after two years at Racing Point and five at their indirect predecessor, Force India. Ferrari finished sixth in the World Constructors' Championship, their worst championship result since 1980 when they finished tenth.

== Results and standings ==
=== Grands Prix ===
Round	Grand Prix	Pole position	Fastest lap	Winning driver	Winning constructor	Report
1	(Austria) Austrian Grand Prix	(Finland) Valtteri Bottas	(United Kingdom) Lando Norris	(Finland) Valtteri Bottas	(Germany) Mercedes	Report
2	(Austria) Styrian Grand Prix	(United Kingdom) Lewis Hamilton	(Spain) Carlos Sainz Jr.	(United Kingdom) Lewis Hamilton	(Germany) Mercedes	Report
3	(Hungary) Hungarian Grand Prix	(United Kingdom) Lewis Hamilton	(United Kingdom) Lewis Hamilton	(United Kingdom) Lewis Hamilton	(Germany) Mercedes	Report
4	(United Kingdom) British Grand Prix	(United Kingdom) Lewis Hamilton	(Netherlands) Max Verstappen	(United Kingdom) Lewis Hamilton	(Germany) Mercedes	Report
5	(United Kingdom) 70th Anniversary Grand Prix	(Finland) Valtteri Bottas	(United Kingdom) Lewis Hamilton	(Netherlands) Max Verstappen	(Austria) Red Bull Racing-Honda	Report
6	(Spain) Spanish Grand Prix	(United Kingdom) Lewis Hamilton	(Finland) Valtteri Bottas	(United Kingdom) Lewis Hamilton	(Germany) Mercedes	Report
7	(Belgium) Belgian Grand Prix	(United Kingdom) Lewis Hamilton	(Australia) Daniel Ricciardo	(United Kingdom) Lewis Hamilton	(Germany) Mercedes	Report
8	(Italy) Italian Grand Prix	(United Kingdom) Lewis Hamilton	(United Kingdom) Lewis Hamilton	(France) Pierre Gasly	(Italy) AlphaTauri-Honda	Report
9	(Italy) Tuscan Grand Prix	(United Kingdom) Lewis Hamilton	(United Kingdom) Lewis Hamilton	(United Kingdom) Lewis Hamilton	(Germany) Mercedes	Report
10	(Russia) Russian Grand Prix	(United Kingdom) Lewis Hamilton	(Finland) Valtteri Bottas	(Finland) Valtteri Bottas	(Germany) Mercedes	Report
11	(Germany) Eifel Grand Prix	(Finland) Valtteri Bottas	(Netherlands) Max Verstappen	(United Kingdom) Lewis Hamilton	(Germany) Mercedes	Report
12	(Portugal) Portuguese Grand Prix	(United Kingdom) Lewis Hamilton	(United Kingdom) Lewis Hamilton	(United Kingdom) Lewis Hamilton	(Germany) Mercedes	Report
13	(Italy) Emilia Romagna Grand Prix	(Finland) Valtteri Bottas	(United Kingdom) Lewis Hamilton	(United Kingdom) Lewis Hamilton	(Germany) Mercedes	Report
14	(Turkey) Turkish Grand Prix	(Canada) Lance Stroll	(United Kingdom) Lando Norris	(United Kingdom) Lewis Hamilton	(Germany) Mercedes	Report
15	Bahrain Grand Prix	(United Kingdom) Lewis Hamilton	(Netherlands) Max Verstappen	(United Kingdom) Lewis Hamilton	(Germany) Mercedes	Report
16	(Bahrain) Sakhir Grand Prix	(Finland) Valtteri Bottas	(United Kingdom) George Russell	(Mexico) Sergio Pérez	(United Kingdom) Racing Point-BWT Mercedes	Report
17	(United Arab Emirates) Abu Dhabi Grand Prix	(Netherlands) Max Verstappen	(Australia) Daniel Ricciardo	(Netherlands) Max Verstappen	(Austria) Red Bull Racing-Honda	Report

=== Scoring system ===
Points were awarded to the top ten classified drivers and the driver who set the fastest lap. The driver with the fastest lap had to be within the top 10 to receive the point. In the case of a tie on points a countback system was used where the driver with the best results is ranked higher, if the best result was identical then the next best result was considered. The points were awarded for every race using the following system:

Position	1st	2nd	3rd	4th	5th	6th	7th	8th	9th	10th	FL
Points	25	18	15	12	10	8	6	4	2	1	1

=== World Drivers' Championship standings ===
Pos.	Driver	AUT (Austria)	STY (Austria)	HUN (Hungary)	GBR (United Kingdom)	70A (United Kingdom)	ESP (Spain)	BEL (Belgium)	ITA (Italy)	TUS (Italy)	RUS (Russia)	EIF (Germany)	POR (Portugal)	EMI (Italy)	TUR (Turkey)	BHR (Bahrain)	SKH (Bahrain)	ABU (United Arab Emirates)	Points
1	(United Kingdom) Lewis Hamilton	4	1^{P}	1^{P}^{F}	1^{P}	2^{F}	1^{P}	1^{P}	7^{P}^{F}	1^{P}^{F}	3^{P}	1	1^{P}^{F}	1^{F}	1	1^{P}		3	347
2	(Finland) Valtteri Bottas	1^{P}	2	3	11	3^{P}	3^{F}	2	5	2	1^{F}	Ret^{P}	2	2^{P}	14	8	8^{P}	2	223
3	(Netherlands) Max Verstappen	Ret	3	2	2^{F}	1	2	3	Ret	Ret	2	2^{F}	3	Ret	6	2^{F}	Ret	1^{P}	214
4	(Mexico) Sergio Pérez	6	6	7	WD		5	10	10	5	4	4	7	6	2	18†	1	Ret	125
5	(Australia) Daniel Ricciardo	Ret	8	8	4	14	11	4^{F}	6	4	5	3	9	3	10	7	5	7^{F}	119
6	(Spain) Carlos Sainz Jr.	5	9^{F}	9	13	13	6	DNS	2	Ret	Ret	5	6	7	5	5	4	6	105
7	(Thailand) Alexander Albon	13†	4	5	8	5	8	6	15	3	10	Ret	12	15	7	3	6	4	105
8	(Monaco) Charles Leclerc	2	Ret	11	3	4	Ret	14	Ret	8	6	7	4	5	4	10	Ret	13	98
9	(United Kingdom) Lando Norris	3^{F}	5	13	5	9	10	7	4	6	15	Ret	13	8	8^{F}	4	10	5	97
10	(France) Pierre Gasly	7	15	Ret	7	11	9	8	1	Ret	9	6	5	Ret	13	6	11	8	75
11	(Canada) Lance Stroll	Ret	7	4	9	6	4	9	3	Ret	Ret	WD	Ret	13	9^{P}	Ret	3	10	75
12	(France) Esteban Ocon	8	Ret	14	6	8	13	5	8	Ret	7	Ret	8	Ret	11	9	2	9	62
13	(Germany) Sebastian Vettel	10	Ret	6	10	12	7	13	Ret	10	13	11	10	12	3	13	12	14	33
14	(Russia) Daniil Kvyat	12†	10	12	Ret	10	12	11	9	7	8	15	19	4	12	11	7	11	32
15	(Germany) Nico Hülkenberg				DNS	7						8							10
16	(Finland) Kimi Räikkönen	Ret	11	15	17	15	14	12	13	9	14	12	11	9	15	15	14	12	4
17	(Italy) Antonio Giovinazzi	9	14	17	14	17	16	Ret	16	Ret	11	10	15	10	Ret	16	13	16	4
18	(United Kingdom) George Russell	Ret	16	18	12	18	17	Ret	14	11	18	Ret	14	Ret	16	12	9^{F}	15	3
19	(France) Romain Grosjean	Ret	13	16	16	16	19	15	12	12	17	9	17	14	Ret	Ret			2
20	(Denmark) Kevin Magnussen	Ret	12	10	Ret	Ret	15	17	Ret	Ret	12	13	16	Ret	17†	17	15	18	1
21	(Canada) Nicholas Latifi	11	17	19	15	19	18	16	11	Ret	16	14	18	11	Ret	14	Ret	17	0
22	(United Kingdom) Jack Aitken																16		0
23	(Brazil) Pietro Fittipaldi																17	19	0
Pos.	Driver	AUT (Austria)	STY (Austria)	HUN (Hungary)	GBR (United Kingdom)	70A (United Kingdom)	ESP (Spain)	BEL (Belgium)	ITA (Italy)	TUS (Italy)	RUS (Russia)	EIF (Germany)	POR (Portugal)	EMI (Italy)	TUR (Turkey)	BHR (Bahrain)	SKH (Bahrain)	ABU (United Arab Emirates)	Points

Key
Colour	Result
Gold	Winner
Silver	Second place
Bronze	Third place
Green	Other points position
Blue	Other classified position
Blue	Not classified, finished (NC)
Purple	Not classified, retired (Ret)
Red	Did not qualify (DNQ)
Black	Disqualified (DSQ)
White	Did not start (DNS)
White	Race cancelled (C)
Blank	Did not practice (DNP)
Blank	Excluded (EX)
Blank	Did not arrive (DNA)
Blank	Withdrawn (WD)
Blank	Did not enter (empty cell)
Annotation	Meaning
P	Pole position
F	Fastest lap

Notes:

- † – Driver did not finish the Grand Prix, but was classified as he completed more than 90% of the race distance.

=== World Constructors' Championship standings ===
Pos.	Constructor	AUT (Austria)	STY (Austria)	HUN (Hungary)	GBR (United Kingdom)	70A (United Kingdom)	ESP (Spain)	BEL (Belgium)	ITA (Italy)	TUS (Italy)	RUS (Russia)	EIF (Germany)	POR (Portugal)	EMI (Italy)	TUR (Turkey)	BHR (Bahrain)	SKH (Bahrain)	ABU (United Arab Emirates)	Points
1	(Germany) Mercedes	1^{P}	1^{P}	1^{P}^{F}	1^{P}	2^{F}	1^{P}	1^{P}	5	1^{P}^{F}	1^{F}	1	1^{P}^{F}	1^{F}	1	1^{P}	8^{P}	2	573
1	(Germany) Mercedes	4	2	3	11	3^{P}	3^{F}	2	7^{P}^{F}	2	3^{P}	Ret^{P}	2	2^{P}	14	8	9^{F}	3	573
2	(Austria) Red Bull Racing-Honda	13†	3	2	2^{F}	1	2	3	15	3	2	2^{F}	3	15	6	2^{F}	6	1^{P}	319
2	(Austria) Red Bull Racing-Honda	Ret	4	5	8	5	8	6	Ret	Ret	10	Ret	12	Ret	7	3	Ret	4	319
3	(United Kingdom) McLaren-Renault	3^{F}	5	9	5	9	6	7	2	6	15	5	6	7	5	4	4	5	202
3	(United Kingdom) McLaren-Renault	5	9^{F}	13	13	13	10	DNS	4	Ret	Ret	Ret	13	8	8^{F}	5	10	6	202
4	(United Kingdom) Racing Point-BWT Mercedes	6	6	4	9	6	4	9	3	5	4	4	7	6	2	18†	1	10	195 (Note: Racing Point drivers scored 210 points, but the constructor was deducted 15 points after a protest from Renault was upheld regarding the legality of their car.)
4	(United Kingdom) Racing Point-BWT Mercedes	Ret	7	7	DNS	7	5	10	10	Ret	Ret	8	Ret	13	9^{P}	Ret	3	Ret	195
5	(France) Renault	8	8	8	4	8	11	4^{F}	6	4	5	3	8	3	10	7	2	7^{F}	181
5	(France) Renault	Ret	Ret	14	6	14	13	5	8	Ret	7	Ret	9	Ret	11	9	5	9	181
6	(Italy) Ferrari	2	Ret	6	3	4	7	13	Ret	8	6	7	4	5	3	10	12	13	131
6	(Italy) Ferrari	10	Ret	11	10	12	Ret	14	Ret	10	13	11	10	12	4	13	Ret	14	131
7	(Italy) AlphaTauri-Honda	7	10	12	7	10	9	8	1	7	8	6	5	4	12	6	7	8	107
7	(Italy) AlphaTauri-Honda	12†	15	Ret	Ret	11	12	11	9	Ret	9	15	19	Ret	13	11	11	11	107
8	(Switzerland) Alfa Romeo Racing-Ferrari	9	11	15	14	15	14	12	13	9	11	10	11	9	15	15	13	12	8
8	(Switzerland) Alfa Romeo Racing-Ferrari	Ret	14	17	17	17	16	Ret	16	Ret	14	12	15	10	Ret	16	14	16	8
9	(United States) Haas-Ferrari	Ret	12	10	16	16	15	15	12	12	12	9	16	14	17†	17	15	18	3
9	(United States) Haas-Ferrari	Ret	13	16	Ret	Ret	19	17	Ret	Ret	17	13	17	Ret	Ret	Ret	17	19	3
10	(United Kingdom) Williams-Mercedes	11	16	18	12	18	17	16	11	11	16	14	14	11	16	12	16	15	0
10	(United Kingdom) Williams-Mercedes	Ret	17	19	15	19	18	Ret	14	Ret	18	Ret	18	Ret	Ret	14	Ret	17	0
Pos.	Constructor	AUT (Austria)	STY (Austria)	HUN (Hungary)	GBR (United Kingdom)	70A (United Kingdom)	ESP (Spain)	BEL (Belgium)	ITA (Italy)	TUS (Italy)	RUS (Russia)	EIF (Germany)	POR (Portugal)	EMI (Italy)	TUR (Turkey)	BHR (Bahrain)	SKH (Bahrain)	ABU (United Arab Emirates)	Points

Key
Colour	Result
Gold	Winner
Silver	Second place
Bronze	Third place
Green	Other points position
Blue	Other classified position
Blue	Not classified, finished (NC)
Purple	Not classified, retired (Ret)
Red	Did not qualify (DNQ)
Black	Disqualified (DSQ)
White	Did not start (DNS)
White	Race cancelled (C)
Blank	Did not practice (DNP)
Blank	Excluded (EX)
Blank	Did not arrive (DNA)
Blank	Withdrawn (WD)
Blank	Did not enter (empty cell)
Annotation	Meaning
P	Pole position
F	Fastest lap

Notes:

- † – Driver did not finish the Grand Prix, but was classified as he completed more than 90% of the race distance.
- The standings are sorted by best result, rows are not related to the drivers. In case of tie on points, the best positions achieved determined the outcome.

== See also ==
- 2020 Formula One pre-season testing
- 2020 Formula One post-season testing
