= Red Bull Racing RB16 =

2020–2021 Formula One racing car

Red Bull Racing RB16 Red Bull Racing RB16B
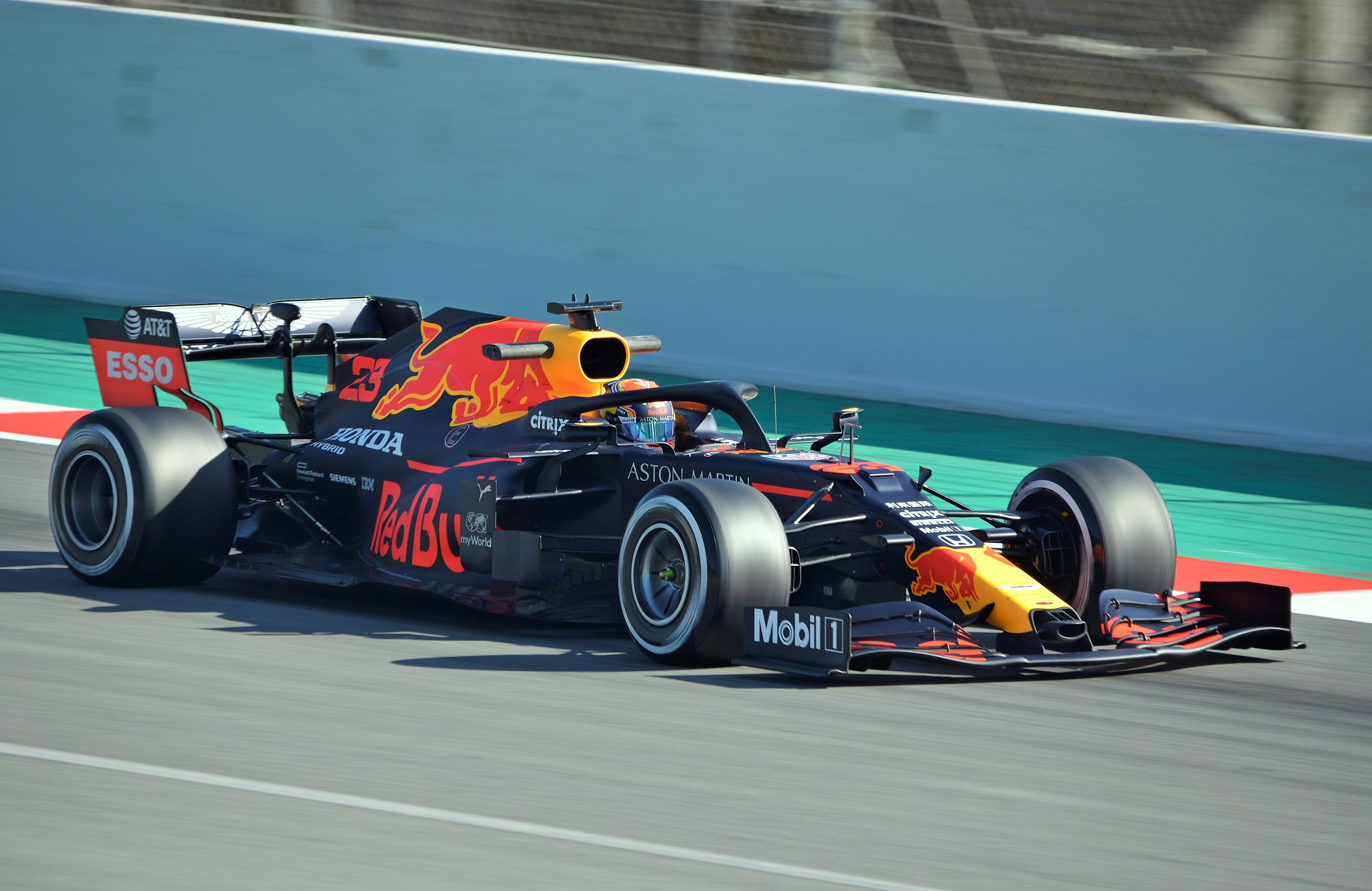
- An RB16 driven by Alexander Albon at the 2020 Formula One pre-season testing
- Category: Formula One
- Constructor: Red Bull Racing (chassis); Honda Racing Development Sakura (power unit)
- Designers: Adrian Newey (Chief Technical Officer); Pierre Waché (Technical Director); Rob Marshall (Chief Engineering Officer); Paul Monaghan (Chief Engineer, Car Engineering); Guillaume Cattelani (Chief Engineer, Technology and Analysis Tools); Rob Gray (Chief Designer); Steve Winstanley (Chief Designer - Composites and Structures); Edward Aveling (Chief Designer - Mechanical and Systems); Ben Waterhouse (Head of Performance Engineering); Dan Fallows (Head of Aerodynamics); Enrico Balbo (Head of Aerodynamic Development); Craig Skinner (Chief Aerodynamicist); Toyoharu Tanabe (Power Unit Technical Director - Honda)
- Predecessor: Red Bull RB15
- Successor: Red Bull RB18

Technical specifications
- Engine: 2020; Honda RA620H, 1.6 L (98 cu in) direct injection V6 turbocharged engine limited to 15,000 rpm peak power produced 1010 hp weight 150 kg in a mid-mounted, rear-wheel drive layout 2021; Honda RA621H, 1.6 L (98 cu in) direct injection V6 turbocharged engine limited to 15,000 rpm peak power produced 1040 hp weight 145 kg in a mid-mounted, rear-wheel drive layout
- Electric motor: Honda kinetic and thermal energy recovery systems
- Battery: Honda lithium-ion batteries
- Fuel: Exxon/Esso (Exxon for US race only in 2021) Synergy and Mobil High Performance Unleaded (Mexican race only in 2021) 94.25% gasoline + 5.75% bio fuel
- Lubricants: Mobil 1 0W-40 fully-synthetic motor oil
- Tyres: Pirelli

Competition history
- Notable entrants: 2020: Aston Martin Red Bull Racing; 2021: Red Bull Racing Honda
- Notable drivers: 11. (Mexico) Sergio Pérez; 23. (Thailand) Alexander Albon; 33. (Netherlands) Max Verstappen
- Debut: 2020 Austrian Grand Prix
- First win: 70th Anniversary Grand Prix
- Last win: 2021 Abu Dhabi Grand Prix
- Last event: 2021 Abu Dhabi Grand Prix
Races	Wins	Podiums	Poles	F/Laps
39	13	36	11	11
- Constructors' Championships: 0
- Drivers' Championships: 1 (2021, Max Verstappen)

The Red Bull Racing RB16 and RB16B are Formula One racing cars designed and constructed by Red Bull Racing to compete during the 2020 and 2021 Formula One World Championships, respectively. They were powered by Honda's RA620H (2020) and RA621H (2021) power units, being the second and third Red Bull to use the Japanese manufacturer's engines. The 2021 car won the drivers' title with Max Verstappen, marking the team's first World Championship title in 8 years since Sebastian Vettel won the drivers' title and the team won the constructors' title in 2013. The drivers for 2020 were Max Verstappen and Alexander Albon, both of whom were retained by the team for a fifth and second season respectively, with Sergio Pérez taking Albon's place for 2021. Albon became the team's test and reserve driver for the 2021 season. The RB16 was planned to make its competitive debut at the 2020 Australian Grand Prix, but this was delayed when the race was cancelled and the next three events in Bahrain, Vietnam and China were postponed in response to the COVID-19 pandemic. The RB16 made its debut at the 2020 Austrian Grand Prix, while the RB16B made its debut at the 2021 Bahrain Grand Prix.

The pandemic prompted the delay of technical regulations that had been planned for introduction in 2021. Under an agreement between teams and the Fédération Internationale de l'Automobile, 2020-specification cars—including the RB16—saw their lifespan extended to compete in 2021, with Red Bull producing an updated chassis called the RB16B, which used Honda's upgraded RA621H power unit.

== Design ==
=== 2020 ===
With largely unchanged technical regulations for the 2020 season, the RB16 was based on its predecessor the RB15. The RB16 featured a narrower nose with two additional inlets at its front, as well as a redesigned barge-board area and smaller side-pod inlets. The car also featured a large 'cape' element below the nose, bodywork that was popularised by Mercedes in 2017 but that Red Bull had not yet adopted. Parts of the rear suspension were raised, and the rear wing featured two supporting pillars compared to its predecessor's one. The team also redesigned the front multi-link suspension of the car, with team principal Christian Horner stating that the intention was to improve the performance of the car in low-speed corners.

=== 2021 ===
Red Bull used its development tokens to change the shape of the gearbox casing, allowing it to rearrange the rear suspension and significantly increase rear downforce.

==== Honda RA621H ====
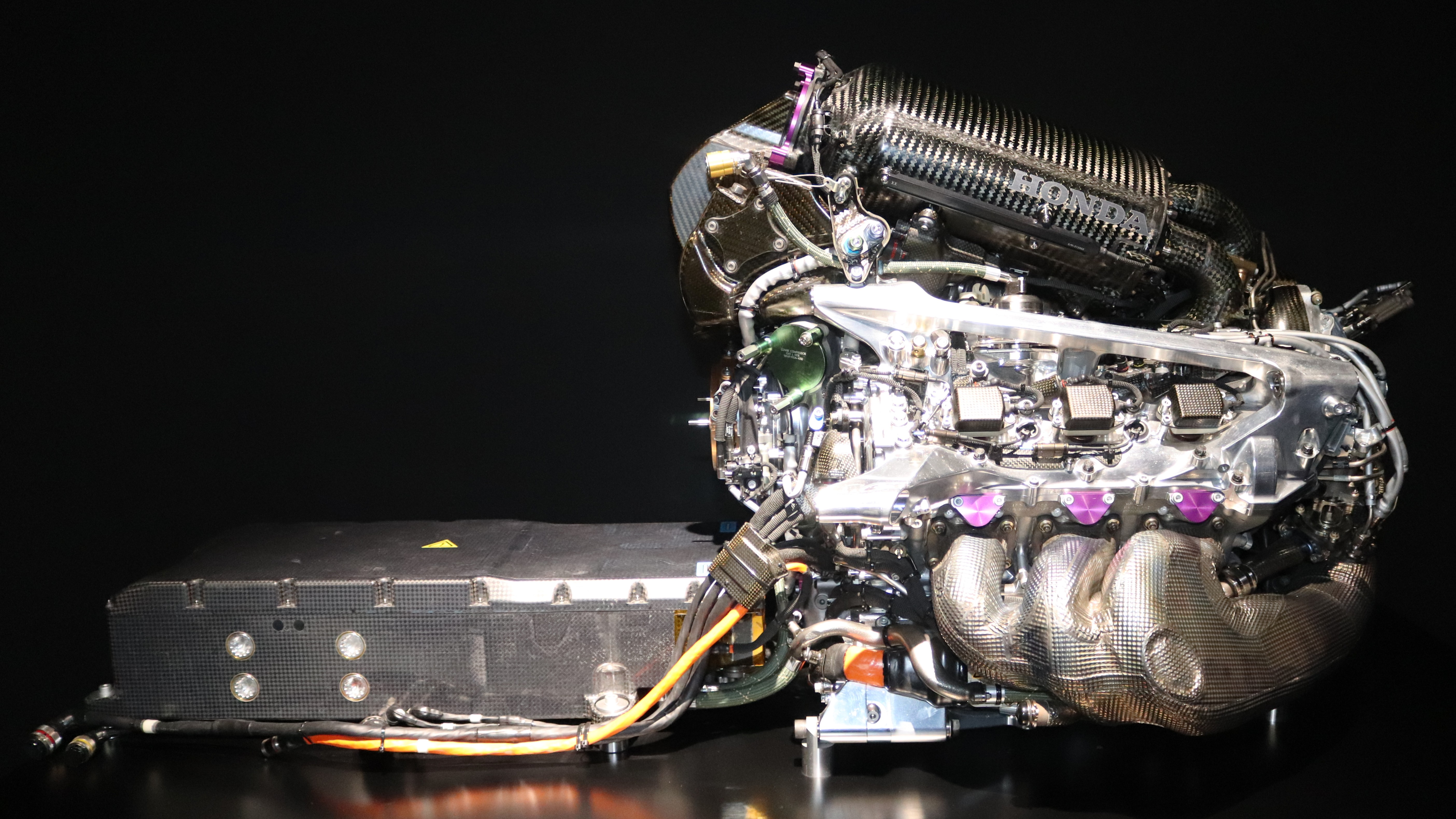
Honda RA621H power unit

Due to difficulties caused by the COVID-19 pandemic, Honda had initially decided to postpone the introduction of its all-new power unit design to the 2022 season. However, following a reassessment of the situation after its decision to leave the sport at the end of the 2021 season, it decided to bring the new design forward by a year to 2021 in a bid to try to beat Mercedes and win the championship in its final official season, although it would only have six months to complete the design before pre-season testing with a risk of significant reliability issues if it encountered problems.

The RA621H was Honda's biggest change since 2017, as it used the same basic concept between 2017 and 2020, though it did not feature a new engine layout like in 2017. Some features of the RA621H include a notably more compact camshaft layout that is placed lower, a different valve angle and shorter cylinder bore spacing compared to the previous season's RA620H. These changes altered the shape of the combustion chamber and the airflow characteristics within the engine and created a significantly smaller engine with a lower centre of gravity. Honda believed that the engine is even smaller than the "size zero" design it initially used with McLaren when it returned to the sport in 2015, while having significantly improved performance. Other features of the RA621H include a way to increase the power output of the internal combustion engine without decreasing the MGU-H's output, modifications to the turbine and compressor as well as new plating on the cylinder block from the company's Kumamoto motorcycle mass production facility to improve durability.

==== Special livery ====
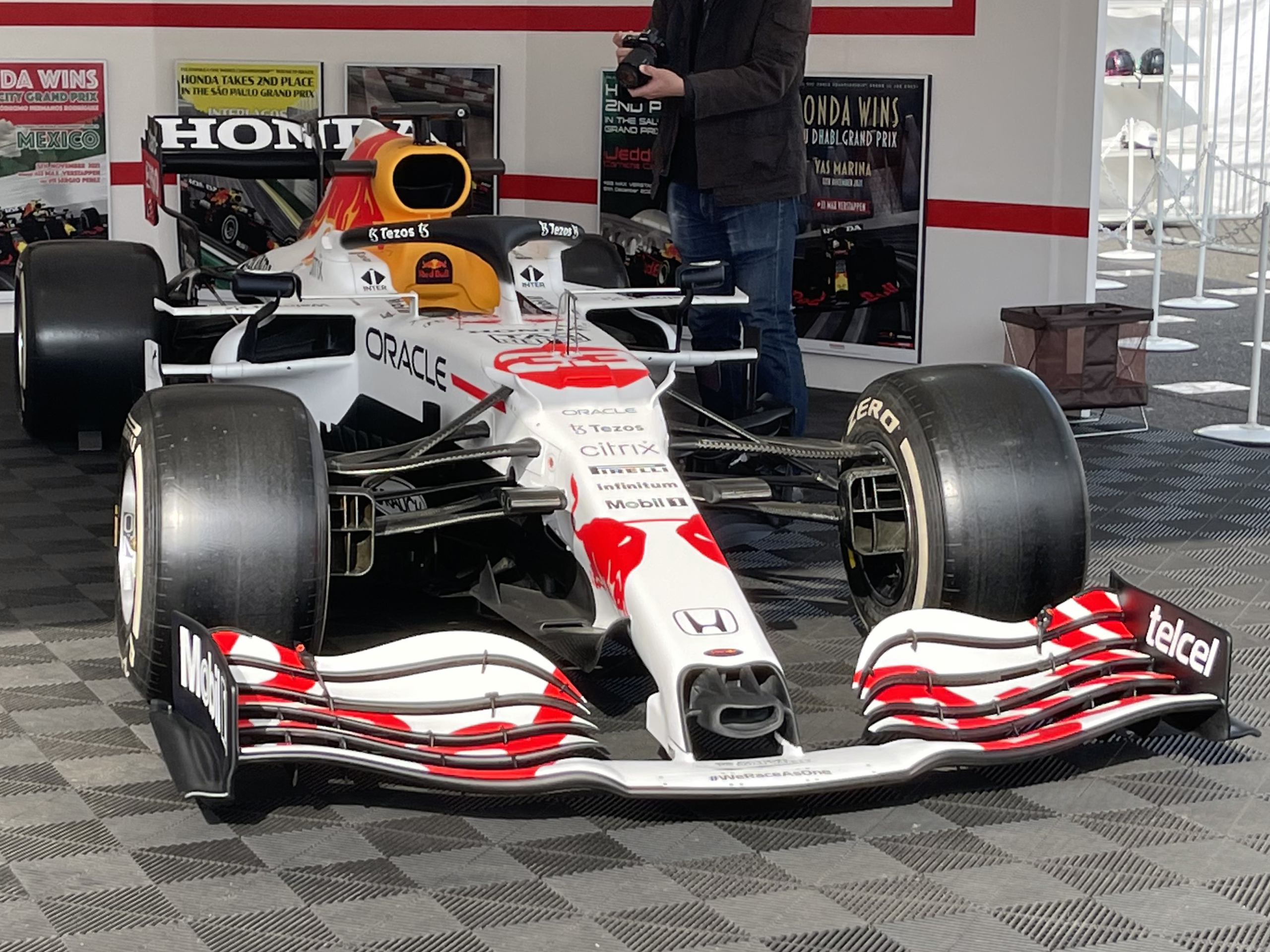
An RB16B with the Honda-themed livery which was used at the 2021 Turkish Grand Prix

At the 2021 Turkish Grand Prix, the livery of the RB16B and drivers' overalls were red and white, inspired by the livery with which Honda won their first Formula One race, the 1965 Mexican Grand Prix. The colouring was originally to be used at Honda's home race, the Japanese Grand Prix, which was cancelled due to the COVID-19 pandemic.

== Competition summary ==
=== 2020 ===
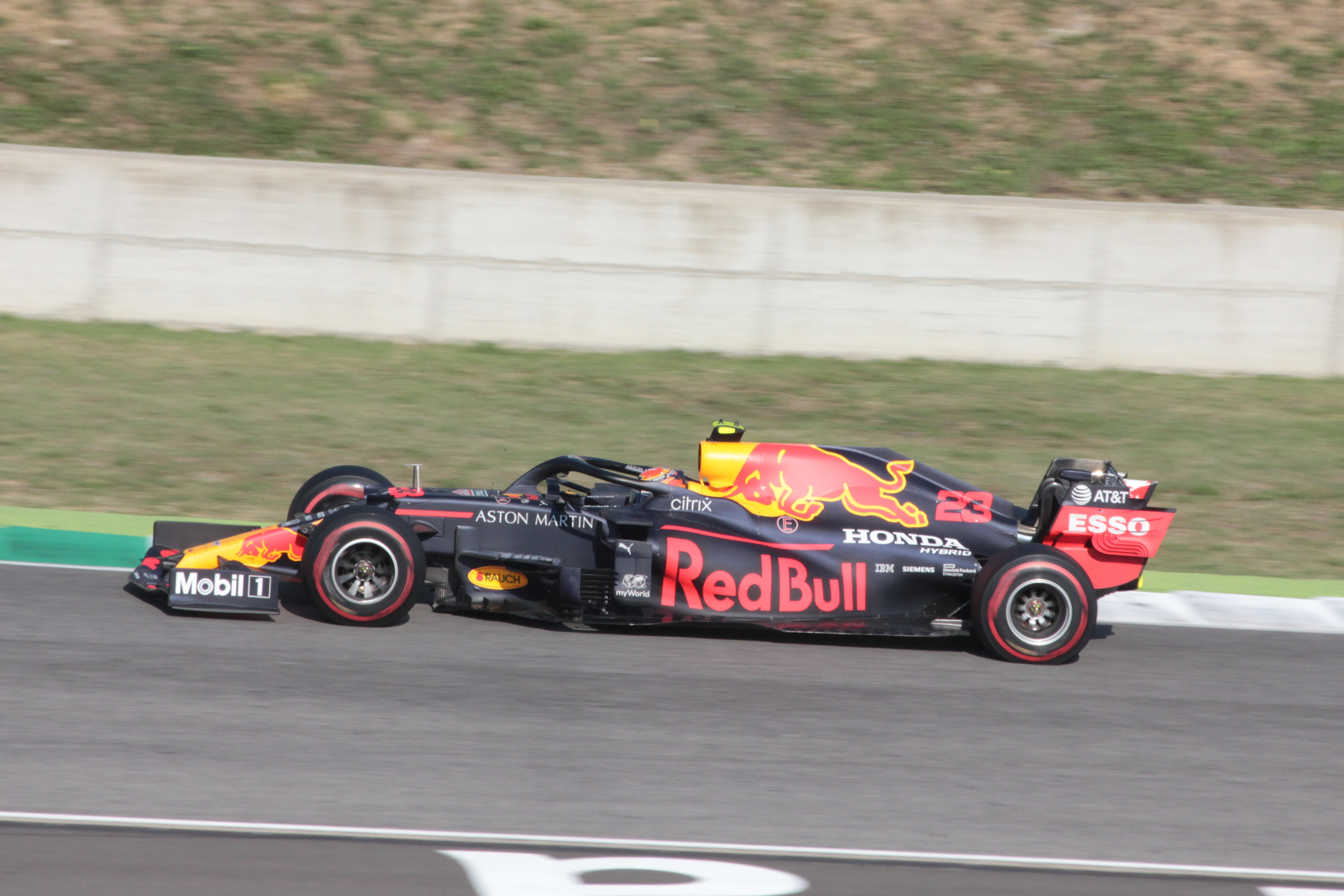
Albon during the 2020 Tuscan Grand Prix, the race in which he took his maiden podium.

Verstappen and Albon started second and fourth on the grid respectively for the season-opening Austrian Grand Prix, however both cars would go on to retire with electrical failures during the race. Despite being reasonably competitive in the hands of Verstappen who scored several podiums including a victory at the 70th Anniversary Grand Prix at Silverstone Circuit, the car was generally no match for the combination of Lewis Hamilton and the Mercedes F1 W11 as Mercedes retained the Constructors' title and Hamilton the Drivers'. Albon struggled to find good form and was outperformed by his teammate, scoring two podium finishes to Verstappen's 11 including 2 wins. The team ended the year on a high, with Verstappen scoring a dominant victory in Abu Dhabi, the first time Red Bull won at the circuit since 2013. Albon also ended the year on a high, being able to pressure Mercedes and prevent them from trying an alternate strategy, finishing fourth. Overall, the team finished second in the constructors championship, with Verstappen and Albon finishing third and seventh, respectively.

=== 2021 ===
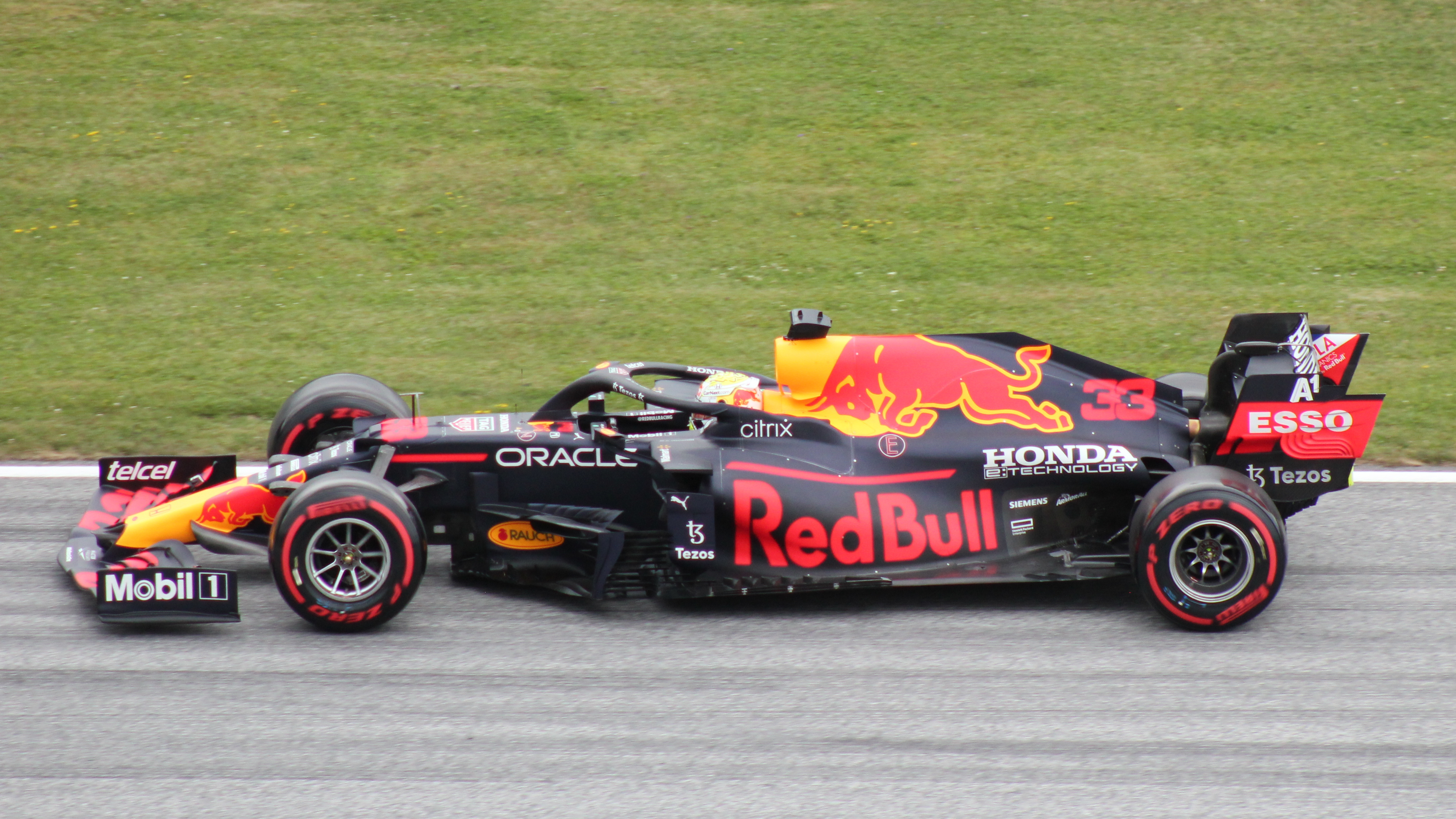
Max Verstappen in the RB16B during practice at the Austrian Grand Prix 2021.

At the season-opening Bahrain Grand Prix, Verstappen finished second and Pérez fifth. During qualifying Verstappen achieved 1st and Pérez 11th. Again Verstappen outperformed his teammate throughout the season, getting 10 wins and 18 podiums, while Pérez got one win and 5 podiums. Verstappen fought for the championship with Lewis Hamilton all season long, winning it on the last lap of the Abu Dhabi Grand Prix, after a last-minute restart, caused by a crash from Nicholas Latifi. Peréz finished fourth in the championship, after being as high as third. Even with Verstappen's success in the Drivers' Championship, Red Bull still finished second in the Constructors' Championship, again behind Mercedes by 28 points.

Overall, the RB16 and RB16B competed in 39 races, winning 13 (success rate of 33.33%). The RB16B became the first non-Mercedes car to win any championship since 2013, Honda became the first Japanese and Asian engine supplier world champions of the turbo-hybrid era, and became one of two championship cars with the Mercedes-AMG F1 W12 (Red Bull won drivers, and Mercedes won constructors).

== Complete Formula One results ==
(key)

Year	Entrant	Chassis	Power unit	Tyres	Driver name	Grands Prix																						Points	WCC
2020	Aston Martin Red Bull Racing	RB16	Honda RA620H	P		AUT	STY	HUN	GBR	70A	ESP	BEL	ITA	TUS	RUS	EIF	POR	EMI	TUR	BHR	SKH	ABU						319	2nd
2020	Aston Martin Red Bull Racing	RB16	Honda RA620H	P	(Thailand) Alexander Albon	13†	4	5	8	5	8	6	15	3	10	Ret	12	15	7	3	6	4						319	2nd
2020	Aston Martin Red Bull Racing	RB16	Honda RA620H	P	(Netherlands) Max Verstappen	Ret	3	2	2^{F}	1	2	3	Ret	Ret	2	2^{F}	3	Ret	6	2^{F}	Ret	1^{P}						319	2nd
2021	Red Bull Racing Honda	RB16B	Honda RA621H	P		BHR	EMI	POR	ESP	MON	AZE	FRA	STY	AUT	GBR	HUN	BEL^{‡}	NED	ITA	RUS	TUR	USA	MXC	SAP	QAT	SAU	ABU	585.5	2nd
2021	Red Bull Racing Honda	RB16B	Honda RA621H	P	(Mexico) Sergio Pérez	5	11	4	5	4	1	3	4	6	16^{F}	Ret	19	8	5	9	3	3	3	4^{F}	4	Ret	15†	585.5	2nd
2021	Red Bull Racing Honda	RB16B	Honda RA621H	P	(Netherlands) Max Verstappen	2^{P}	1	2	2^{F}	1	18†^{F}	1^{P}^{F}	1^{P}	1^{P}^{F}	Ret^{1 P}	9	1^{P}	1^{P}	Ret^{2 P}	2	2	1^{P}	1	2^{2}	2^{F}	2	1^{P}^{F}	585.5	2nd

Notes

- † Driver failed to finish the race, but was classified as they had completed over 90% of the winner's race distance.
- ‡ Half points awarded as less than 75% of race distance completed.

Awards
Preceded by Mercedes-AMG F1 W11 EQ Performance	Autosport; Racing Car of the Year; 2021	Succeeded by Red Bull Racing RB18
