= Spielberg, Styria =

Spielberg
- Municipality
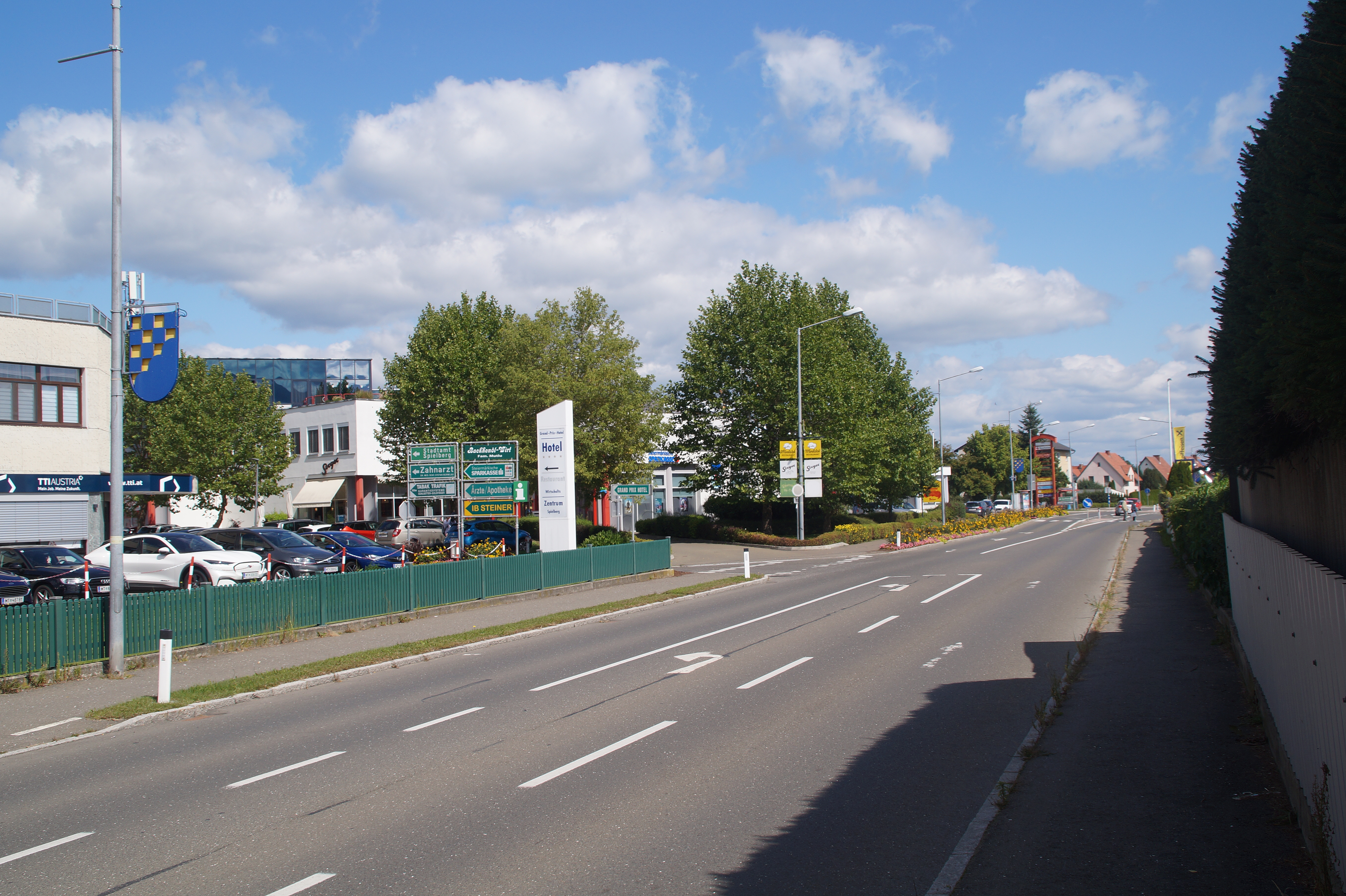

- Coat of arms

- Location within Austria
- Coordinates: 47°13′00″N 14°47′00″E
- Country: Austria
- State: Styria
- District: Murtal

Government
  - Mayor: Manfred Lenger (SPÖ)

Area
  - Total: 29.69 km^{2} (11.46 sq mi)
- Elevation: 660 m (2,170 ft)

Population (2018-01-01)
  - Total: 5,383
  - Density: 181.3/km^{2} (469.6/sq mi)
- Time zone: UTC+1 (CET)
  - Summer (DST): UTC+2 (CEST)
- Postal code: 8724
- Area code: 03512, 03577
- Vehicle registration: MT
- Website: www.spielberg.at

Spielberg (formerly: Spielberg bei Knittelfeld) is a city located in the Bezirk Murtal in Styria, Austria.

== General ==
The city of Spielberg, with a population of about 5,000 inhabitants, is located north of the Mur in the east of Aichfeld, between the cities of Zeltweg and Knittelfeld. From 1986 to 2009 Spielberg was a Marktgemeinde (market town). On 1 October 2009 it became a "Stadtgemeinde" (city).

=== Structure ===
The city is made up of 9 Katastralgemeinden (cadastral communities). Pausendorf is the biggest Katastralgemeinde in Spielberg. The first documented mentions of Lind date to between 860 and 890, making it among the oldest settled areas in Upper Styria.

- Einhörn
- Laing
- Lind
- Maßweg
- Pausendorf
- Sachendorf
- Schönberg
- Spielberg
- Weyern

== Politics ==
The 2024 Styrian state election saw the FPÖ win as part of their second state election win.

== Landmarks ==
Spielberg is home to the Red Bull Ring (formerly known as A1-Ring and Österreichring). From 1970 until 1987 and again from 1997 until 2003, the Grand Prix of Austria took place there. The track was rebuilt and modernized between 2008 and 2011. The newly rebuilt track hosted a round in the 2011 DTM season. In 2014, it returned to the Formula 1 calendar with the 2014 Austrian Grand Prix. In 2020 the first 2 races of the delayed F1 season took place there: the Austrian GP and the Styrian GP. In 2021, following the postponement of the Turkish GP, a second race, the Styrian GP, was held one week before the Austrian GP.
