= 2020 Austrian Grand Prix =

Formula One motor race

Race 1 of 17 (Note: The outbreak of the COVID-19 pandemic saw several Grands Prix cancelled or rescheduled. The revised calendar consisted of seventeen races.) in the 2020 Formula One World Championship
Next race →
- Layout of the Red Bull Ring

Race details
- Date: 5 July 2020
- Official name: Formula 1 Rolex Großer Preis von Österreich 2020
- Location: Red Bull Ring; Spielberg, Styria, Austria
- Course: Permanent racing facility
- Course length: 4.318 km (2.683 miles)
- Distance: 71 laps, 306.452 km (190.420 miles)
- Weather: Sunny
- Attendance: 0 (Note: The Grand Prix was held behind closed doors due to the COVID-19 pandemic in Austria.)

Pole position
Driver	(Finland) Valtteri Bottas	Mercedes
- Time: 1:02.939

Fastest lap
Driver	(United Kingdom) Lando Norris	McLaren-Renault
- Time: 1:07.475 on lap 71

Podium
First	(Finland) Valtteri Bottas	Mercedes
Second	(Monaco) Charles Leclerc	Ferrari
Third	(United Kingdom) Lando Norris	McLaren-Renault

The 2020 Austrian Grand Prix (officially known as the Formula 1 Rolex Großer Preis von Österreich 2020) was a Formula One motor race that was held on 5 July 2020 at the Red Bull Ring in Spielberg, Austria. The race was the opening round of the 2020 Formula One World Championship, and the 34th running of the Austrian Grand Prix (the 33rd as part of the World Championship since 1950) as well as the first of two consecutive races held at the Red Bull Ring, with the 2020 Styrian Grand Prix taking place the week after.

Lewis Hamilton entered the round as the defending World Drivers' Champion and his team, Mercedes as the defending World Constructors' Champion. Max Verstappen was the defending race winner, having won the 2018 and 2019 Austrian Grands Prix. The race was won by Mercedes driver Valtteri Bottas with Charles Leclerc in second for Ferrari and Lando Norris finishing third for McLaren – his first podium in Formula One. Norris became the 3rd youngest driver to achieve a podium, which has since been surpassed by Andrea Kimi Antonelli at the 2025 Canadian Grand Prix.

== Background ==
=== Impact of the COVID-19 pandemic ===
The originally scheduled calendar for the 2020 championship was heavily affected by the COVID-19 pandemic. Several Grands Prix were cancelled or postponed after the planned opening round in Australia was called off two days before the race was due to take place; prompting the FIA to draft a new calendar. The start of the championship was delayed until 5 July, with the Red Bull Ring hosting the Austrian Grand Prix as the opening round of the championship. Organisers of the race signed a contract to host a second round at the circuit on 12 July which was known as the Styrian Grand Prix. The back-to-back Austrian races would mark the first time that a country hosted back-to-back races in the same season since 1995 when Japan hosted the Pacific and Japanese Grands Prix. (Note: The 1995 Australian Grand Prix was the last of the 1995 season and the 1996 race was the first race of the 1996 season, which marked the previous time a country hosted two consecutive Grands Prix.) This would also mark the first time in the sport's history that the same venue and circuit layout would have hosted back-to-back World Championship races and the first time that a Formula One race weekend was held behind closed doors.

=== Entrants ===
Twenty drivers representing ten teams entered the race. Scuderia AlphaTauri made their debut as a constructor, having previously competed under the name Scuderia Toro Rosso from 2006 to 2019. Esteban Ocon made a return to the championship with Renault, replacing the departing Nico Hülkenberg after being out of the sport since the end of the 2018 season. Nicholas Latifi made his competitive debut with Williams, replacing Robert Kubica who only raced for one season with Williams after returning to F1 following a serious rally crash in 2011.

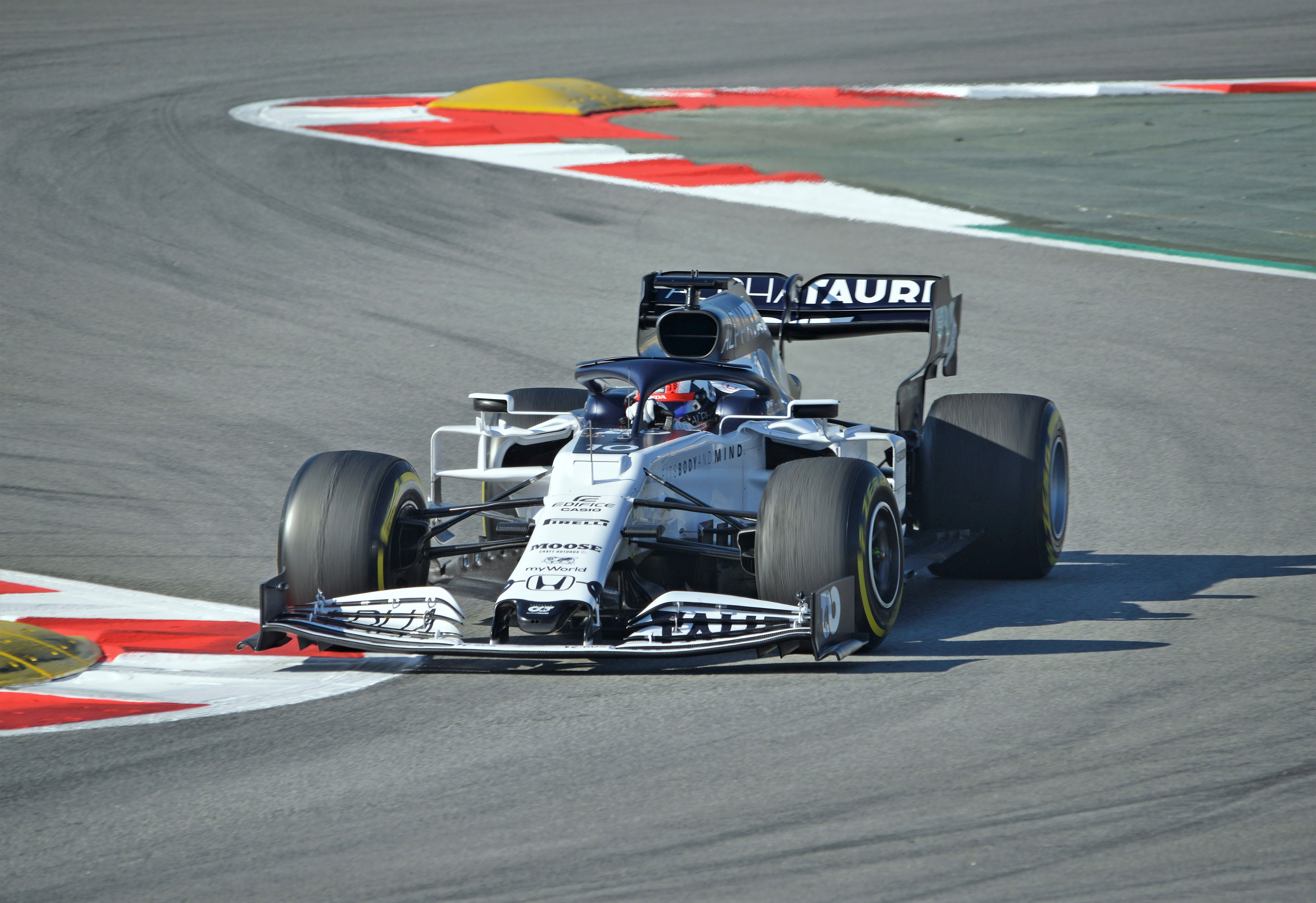
Scuderia AlphaTauri made their debut entry into F1 with the AT01 after previously competing under Toro Rosso from 2006 to 2019.

Mercedes changed their livery to black instead of their traditional silver for the 2020 season. This was in support for the ongoing Black Lives Matter movement and a commitment to diversity and ending racism. Formula One launched a "We Race as One" initiative which focused on fighting the challenges of COVID-19 and global inequality. Rainbows would be displayed across the circuit and team liveries to show appreciation to key workers and individuals affected by the COVID-19 outbreak as well as being a gesture to bringing communities together. McLaren announced an updated livery for the 2020 season featuring a rainbow on the halo, rainbow colours on the sidepod and "End Racism" messaging.

=== Tyres ===
Tyre supplier Pirelli brought the C2, C3 and C4 (designated hard, medium and soft respectively) compounds of tyres for teams to use at the event. These are the second, third, and fourth hardest compounds available of the five Pirelli produce. In recognition of the need to cut costs and to give Pirelli achievable targets due to the congested calendar, all drivers received identical tyre allocations getting two sets of hards, three sets of mediums and eight sets of softs.

== Practice ==
Three practice sessions were held before the race; the first two sessions were held on Friday morning at 11:00-12:30 and 15:00-16:30 local time, respectively. The third practice session was held on Saturday morning at 12:00-13:00. The first session started with showers for 30 minutes, a few laps were set on the intermediate tyre before moving onto dry tyres. Lewis Hamilton set the fastest time of the session with a 1:04.816 on soft tyres, more than three-tenths of a second quicker than teammate Valtteri Bottas. Hamilton also topped the drier second practice session with a time of a 1:04.304 with Bottas trailing by 0.197s. The third practice session was much warmer than the previous sessions with track temperatures reaching as high as 49 °C (120 °F) compared to the peak track temperature of 36 °C (97 °F) from the day before. The session also saw the first crash of the season when Nicholas Latifi hit the barriers at turn 1 just after 45 minutes. Hamilton topped the session by posting a time of 1:04.130, 0.147s ahead of Bottas.

== Qualifying ==
=== Qualifying report ===
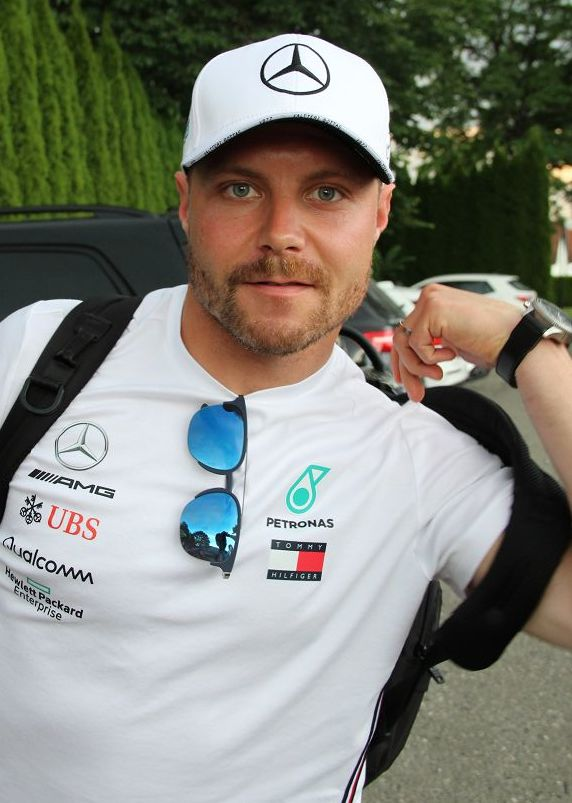
Valtteri Bottas took the first pole position of the season.

The qualifying session was held on Saturday afternoon after the third practice session and was split into three parts. The first part (Q1) ran for 18 minutes, at the end of this period the five slowest cars were eliminated. During Q1, the 107% rule was in place, which required all drivers to set a time within 107% of the quickest Q1 time, in order to qualify for the race. The second part of qualifying (Q2) ran for 15 minutes, after which the five slowest cars were eliminated. The third and final part of qualifying (Q3) ran for 12 minutes, after which the ten remaining cars had their grid positions set. The fastest driver of Q3 obtained pole position.

Bottas clinched pole position ahead of teammate Hamilton, despite going onto the grass on his last Q3 attempt. Max Verstappen finished third in his Red Bull RB16, half a second behind the Mercedes pair. Lando Norris qualified a career best fourth in his McLaren ahead of Verstappen's Red Bull teammate Alexander Albon in fifth, with Sergio Pérez of Racing Point in sixth. Ferrari struggled in the session with Charles Leclerc only qualifying in seventh place, nearly one second off pole position, while his teammate Sebastian Vettel finished in 11th place, failing to make it into Q3. The rest of the top ten was rounded out by Carlos Sainz in eighth for McLaren, Lance Stroll in ninth for Racing Point and Daniel Ricciardo in tenth for Renault.

Earlier, in Q1, the Alfa Romeo Racing team saw both their drivers eliminated with Antonio Giovinazzi and teammate Kimi Räikkönen qualifying in 18th and 19th places respectively, behind the Williams of George Russell and only ahead of the other Williams car of Nicholas Latifi who qualified last.

==== Post-qualifying ====
Following Qualifying, Hamilton was summoned to the stewards under allegations that he did not slow down for the yellow flags shown when Bottas went off the track on his final Q3 run. He stated that he did not see any yellow flags and was subsequently cleared of any wrongdoing by the stewards as "conflicting signals were shown to the driver". However, prior to the race, Red Bull challenged the decision not to award Hamilton a penalty. The stewards reopened the case and decided that Hamilton had ignored yellow flags following new footage from the 360-degree onboard camera; He was then given a 3-place grid penalty for the race.

=== Qualifying classification ===
Pos.	No.	Driver	Constructor	Qualifying times			Final grid
Pos.	No.	Driver	Constructor	Q1	Q2	Q3	Final grid
1	77	(Finland) Valtteri Bottas	Mercedes	1:04.111	1:03.015	1:02.939	1
2	44	(United Kingdom) Lewis Hamilton	Mercedes	1:04.198	1:03.096	1:02.951	5^{a}
3	33	(Netherlands) Max Verstappen	Red Bull Racing-Honda	1:04.024	1:04.000	1:03.477	2
4	4	(United Kingdom) Lando Norris	McLaren-Renault	1:04.606	1:03.819	1:03.626	3
5	23	(Thailand) Alexander Albon	Red Bull Racing-Honda	1:04.661	1:03.746	1:03.868^{b}	4
6	11	(Mexico) Sergio Pérez	Racing Point-BWT Mercedes	1:04.543	1:03.860	1:03.868^{b}	6
7	16	(Monaco) Charles Leclerc	Ferrari	1:04.500	1:04.041	1:03.923	7
8	55	(Spain) Carlos Sainz Jr.	McLaren-Renault	1:04.537	1:03.971	1:03.971	8
9	18	(Canada) Lance Stroll	Racing Point-BWT Mercedes	1:04.309	1:03.955	1:04.029	9
10	3	(Australia) Daniel Ricciardo	Renault	1:04.556	1:04.023	1:04.239	10
11	5	(Germany) Sebastian Vettel	Ferrari	1:04.554	1:04.206	N/A	11
12	10	(France) Pierre Gasly	AlphaTauri-Honda	1:04.603	1:04.305	N/A	12
13	26	(Russia) Daniil Kvyat	AlphaTauri-Honda	1:05.031	1:04.431	N/A	13
14	31	(France) Esteban Ocon	Renault	1:04.933	1:04.643	N/A	14
15	8	(France) Romain Grosjean	Haas-Ferrari	1:05.094	1:04.691	N/A	15
16	20	(Denmark) Kevin Magnussen	Haas-Ferrari	1:05.164	N/A	N/A	16
17	63	(United Kingdom) George Russell	Williams-Mercedes	1:05.167	N/A	N/A	17
18	99	(Italy) Antonio Giovinazzi	Alfa Romeo Racing-Ferrari	1:05.175	N/A	N/A	18
19	7	(Finland) Kimi Räikkönen	Alfa Romeo Racing-Ferrari	1:05.224	N/A	N/A	19
20	6	(Canada) Nicholas Latifi	Williams-Mercedes	1:05.757	N/A	N/A	20
107% time: 1:08.505

Notes

- ^a – Lewis Hamilton received a three-place grid penalty for failing to slow for yellow flags during qualifying.
- ^b – Alexander Albon and Sergio Pérez set identical times in Q3; Albon was classified ahead as he set his lap time before Pérez.

== Race ==
=== Race report ===
==== Early laps ====
The opening lap proceeded without incident, with the only change in position amongst the top ten being Sebastian Vettel claiming tenth place from Daniel Ricciardo. McLaren's Lando Norris, running in third place, was overtaken by Alexander Albon on lap three and then by Lewis Hamilton soon after. Hamilton later entered the podium positions by passing Albon on lap nine.

The first incident of the race came on lap eleven when the Red Bull of Max Verstappen, running in second place, began to slow with a suspected electrical issue. He was able to return to the pits where his mechanics attempted to correct the problem. This was unsuccessful and he was forced to retire from the race. The ninth-placed Racing Point of Lance Stroll began to suffer power loss on lap 17, allowing Vettel and Ricciardo to close in. Ricciardo was soon forced to pull into the pits and retire with suspected overheating issues. On lap 21, Stroll entered the pits and retired from the race, having fallen behind Vettel and the two AlphaTauris. At the same time, 16th-placed Romain Grosjean spun onto the gravel at turn three. He dropped to the back of the field but was able to continue, entering the pits at the end of the lap to become the first driver to change tyres.

==== Mid-race ====
On lap 25, 11th-placed Kevin Magnussen went straight on at turn two having suffered a brake failure, bringing out the first safety car of the race. All cars still remaining, except Grosjean, entered into the pits for their first tyre changes. The order of the top ten after the first round of pit stops was Valtteri Bottas, Hamilton, Albon, Norris, Sergio Pérez, Charles Leclerc, Carlos Sainz Jr, Vettel, Pierre Gasly and Daniil Kvyat. The safety car period ended on lap 31. At the restart, Vettel attempted an overtake on the inside of Sainz Jr. at turn two. The cars made contact and Vettel's Ferrari was pitched into a spin, dropping him to 15th place. On lap 33 Pérez made it past Norris to take fourth place.

Both Mercedes drivers, running first and second, were warned by their engineers to avoid driving over the kerbs. It emerged that the vibrations were damaging the cars' gearboxes, and it was feared this would cause a failure leading to immediate retirement. Running 15th, Grosjean suffered a brake failure on lap 50, but was able to make it to the pits to retire. At the same time, 13th-placed George Russell lost fuel pressure and pulled onto the grass on the inside of turn four, deploying the second safety car of the race. Eight of the fourteen remaining drivers elected to pit for a second tyre change, including Albon who changed to soft-compound tyres, whilst the leading Mercedes cars stayed out on their hard-compound tyres. The order of the top ten was now Bottas, Hamilton, Pérez, Albon, Norris, Leclerc, Gasly, Esteban Ocon, Sainz and Antonio Giovinazzi.

Racing resumed on lap 55. However, almost immediately after the restart, the right-front wheel of Kimi Räikkönen's Alfa Romeo detached from the car as it was cross-threaded during his pitstop, he was forced to stop on the pit straight, bringing out a third safety car. Shortly prior to the safety car deployment, Albon had passed Pérez for third place. Racing resumed on lap 61. Shortly after the restart, Albon attempted an overtake on Hamilton for second place around the outside of turn three. Hamilton's front left wheel was caught in front of Albon's rear right, causing Albon to spin into the gravel. He was able to continue but returned to the track last of the running cars in 13th place. Shortly afterwards, Sainz passed both Ocon and Gasly to take sixth place.

==== Closing laps ====
Fifth-placed Leclerc began to move towards the front, overtaking Norris on lap 64 and then Pérez on lap 65 to take third place. On the next lap, Hamilton received a five-second time penalty, having been judged by the stewards to have caused the earlier collision with Albon. Pérez then received the same penalty for having sped in the pit lane. On lap 68, Albon pulled over at turn six with an electrical failure and Norris passed Pérez for fourth place at turn two. On the penultimate lap, eleventh-placed Kvyat suffered a rear puncture which damaged his suspension and had to retire, making him the ninth retirement of the race. Sainz then passed Pérez for fifth place on the final lap.

Bottas crossed the line, having led every lap of the race, to take the eighth win of his Formula One career and his second win at the Austrian Grand Prix, having won the 2017 edition. Hamilton finished second on track and Leclerc crossing the line in third. On the final lap, a late push from Norris set the fastest lap of the race and reduced his gap to Hamilton to 4.8 seconds. This meant that Hamilton's 5-second penalty dropped him to fourth, promoting Leclerc and Norris to second and third respectively. Sainz finished fifth and Pérez's sixth-place finish was unaffected by his time penalty. Gasly took points for AlphaTauri with seventh place on the team's first race since their rebranding, and Ocon finished eighth on his return to the sport after a year out. Giovinazzi and Vettel rounded out the points positions, with debutant Nicholas Latifi being the only driver to finish the race outside the points in eleventh place.

=== Race classification ===
Pos.	No.	Driver	Constructor	Laps	Time/Retired	Grid	Points
1	77	(Finland) Valtteri Bottas	Mercedes	71	1:30:55.739	1	25
2	16	(Monaco) Charles Leclerc	Ferrari	71	+2.700	7	18
3	4	(United Kingdom) Lando Norris	McLaren-Renault	71	+5.491	3	16^{1}
4	44	(United Kingdom) Lewis Hamilton	Mercedes	71	+5.689^{2}	5	12
5	55	(Spain) Carlos Sainz Jr.	McLaren-Renault	71	+8.903	8	10
6	11	(Mexico) Sergio Pérez	Racing Point-BWT Mercedes	71	+15.092^{3}	6	8
7	10	(France) Pierre Gasly	AlphaTauri-Honda	71	+16.682	12	6
8	31	(France) Esteban Ocon	Renault	71	+17.456	14	4
9	99	(Italy) Antonio Giovinazzi	Alfa Romeo Racing-Ferrari	71	+21.146	18	2
10	5	(Germany) Sebastian Vettel	Ferrari	71	+24.545	11	1
11	6	(Canada) Nicholas Latifi	Williams-Mercedes	71	+31.650	20	
12^{4}	26	(Russia) Daniil Kvyat	AlphaTauri-Honda	69	Suspension	13	
13^{4}	23	(Thailand) Alexander Albon	Red Bull Racing-Honda	67	Electrical	4	
Ret	7	(Finland) Kimi Räikkönen	Alfa Romeo Racing-Ferrari	53	Wheel	19	
Ret	63	(United Kingdom) George Russell	Williams-Mercedes	49	Fuel pressure	17	
Ret	8	(France) Romain Grosjean	Haas-Ferrari	49	Brakes	15	
Ret	20	(Denmark) Kevin Magnussen	Haas-Ferrari	24	Brakes/Spun off	16	
Ret	18	(Canada) Lance Stroll	Racing Point-BWT Mercedes	20	Engine	9	
Ret	3	(Australia) Daniel Ricciardo	Renault	17	Overheating	10	
Ret	33	(Netherlands) Max Verstappen	Red Bull Racing-Honda	11	Electrical	2	
Fastest lap: (United Kingdom) Lando Norris (McLaren-Renault) – 1:07.475 (lap 71)

Notes

- ^1 – Includes one point for fastest lap.
- ^2 – Lewis Hamilton finished second on the track, but received a five-second time penalty for causing a collision with Alexander Albon.
- ^3 – Sergio Pérez received a five-second time penalty for speeding in the pit lane. His final position was not affected by the penalty.
- ^4 – Daniil Kvyat and Alexander Albon did not finish the race, but were classified as they had completed more than 90% of the race distance.

== Championship standings after the race ==
Drivers' Championship standings

Pos.	Driver	Points
1	(Finland) Valtteri Bottas	25
2	(Monaco) Charles Leclerc	18
3	(United Kingdom) Lando Norris	16
4	(United Kingdom) Lewis Hamilton	12
5	(Spain) Carlos Sainz Jr.	10

Constructors' Championship standings

Pos.	Constructor	Points
1	(Germany) Mercedes	37
2	(United Kingdom) McLaren-Renault	26
3	(Italy) Ferrari	19
4	(United Kingdom) Racing Point-BWT Mercedes	8
5	(Italy) AlphaTauri-Honda	6

- Note: Only the top five positions are included for both sets of standings.

== See also ==
- 2020 Spielberg Formula 2 round
- 2020 Spielberg Formula 3 round

== Notes ==
Previous race: 2019 Abu Dhabi Grand Prix; Multiple earlier 2020 Grands Prix called off including the Australian Grand Prix	FIA Formula One World Championship; 2020 season	Next race: 2020 Styrian Grand Prix
Previous race: 2019 Austrian Grand Prix	Austrian Grand Prix	Next race: 2021 Austrian Grand Prix
