= Scuderia AlphaTauri =

Italian Formula One racing team

(Italy) Scuderia AlphaTauri
- Full name: Scuderia AlphaTauri
- Base: Faenza, Italy; Bicester, Oxfordshire, United Kingdom (Aerodynamics)
- Team principal(s): Franz Tost
- Team Manager: Graham Watson
- Technical director: Jody Egginton
- Founder(s): Dietrich Mateschitz
- Website: scuderiaalphatauri.com
- Previous name: Scuderia Toro Rosso
- Next name: RB

Formula One World Championship career
- First entry: 2020 Austrian Grand Prix
- Races entered: 83
- Engines: Honda, RBPT
- Race victories: 1
- Podiums: 2
- Points: 309
- Fastest laps: 2
- Final entry: 2023 Abu Dhabi Grand Prix

Scuderia AlphaTauri S.p.A., commonly known as AlphaTauri, was an Italian Formula One racing team and constructor that competed from 2020 to 2023. It was one of two Formula One constructors owned by Austrian conglomerate Red Bull GmbH, the other being Red Bull Racing. The constructor was rebranded for the 2020 Formula One World Championship from "Toro Rosso" to "AlphaTauri" in order to promote Red Bull's AlphaTauri fashion brand. The team was rebranded as RB in 2024.

According to Franz Tost and Helmut Marko, the rebrand as Scuderia AlphaTauri also acknowledged that it had transitioned from Red Bull Racing's junior team to its sister team. The team scored one victory and one third place during its four seasons in the sport. Both were taken by Pierre Gasly, who won the 2020 Italian Grand Prix and placed third in the 2021 Azerbaijan Grand Prix.

== Origins ==
In September 2019, Toro Rosso announced their intention to change their naming rights for the 2020 championship. It was announced on 1 December 2019 that the team had selected "AlphaTauri" as their new moniker to promote parent company Red Bull's fashion label of the same name by purchasing Toro Rosso's naming rights. Thus, they became Scuderia AlphaTauri and retired the Scuderia Toro Rosso moniker after fourteen years. The team's involvement in Formula One started in the 1985 season when they first competed as Minardi. The team has been owned by Red Bull GmbH since the 2006 season.

== Racing history ==
=== 2020 ===
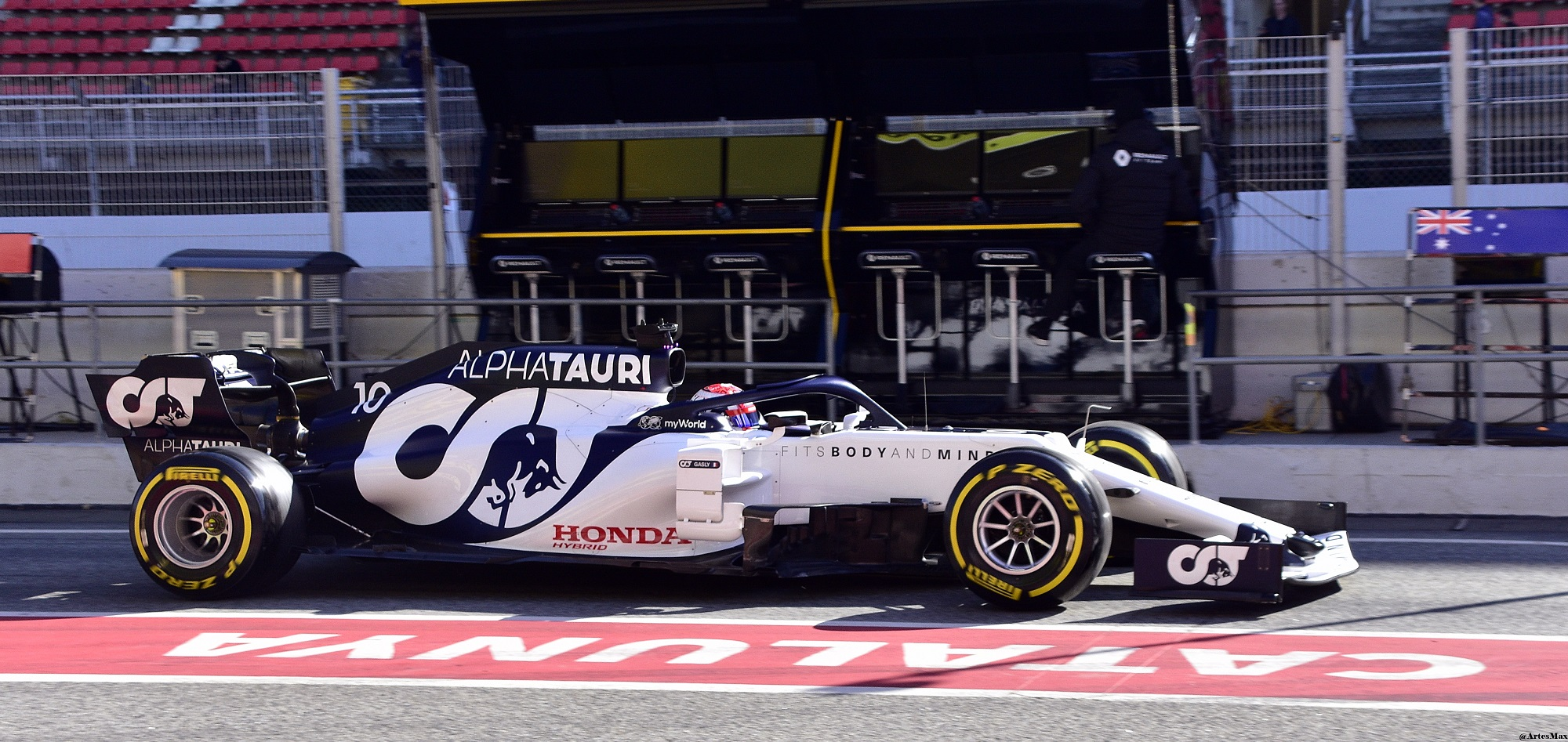
An AT01 driven by Pierre Gasly during pre-season testing

AlphaTauri had Daniil Kvyat and Pierre Gasly drive for them in their debut season. The team remained with the Honda engine, being the team's engine partner since the 2018 season. Sérgio Sette Câmara, Sébastien Buemi, and Jüri Vips were signed as the team's test drivers. The team achieved its first podium finish and race victory under the AlphaTauri name at the 2020 Italian Grand Prix, which also marked Pierre Gasly's first race victory and the first win for a French Formula One driver since Olivier Panis won the 1996 Monaco Grand Prix 24 years prior. AlphaTauri ended the year in 7th place on 107 points, 75 for Gasly and 32 for Kvyat.

=== 2021 ===
For the 2021 season, AlphaTauri retained Gasly and signed Yuki Tsunoda to replace Kvyat. Gasly scored the team's first podium of the year by finishing in third place at the Azerbaijan Grand Prix. Gasly also consolidated this by finishing 4th at the Dutch and Mexico City Grands Prix. Tsunoda's best finish was 4th place at the Abu Dhabi Grand Prix.

=== 2022 ===
Both drivers were retained for the 2022 season. AlphaTauri used Red Bull-branded Honda engines due to the former's subsequent takeover of the Honda engine programme following Honda exiting Formula One following the 2021 season.

=== 2023 ===
For the 2023 season, Yuki Tsunoda was retained and Nyck de Vries signed with the team with Gasly moving to Alpine after five years with the team.

Team principal Tost left the team at the end of the season and was replaced by Ferrari sporting director Laurent Mekies following the team's rebranding to RB Formula One Team.

Ahead of the Hungarian Grand Prix, De Vries was released from the team, with Daniel Ricciardo replacing him on loan from Red Bull Racing for the remainder of the season. Ricciardo suffered a broken metacarpal on his left hand after crashing during the second practice session of the Dutch Grand Prix. As a result, Liam Lawson was brought in as Ricciardo's replacement for the events between the Dutch and Qatar Grands Prix. Ricciardo returned for the final five races of the season, and scored the team's highest points finish with seventh place in the 2023 Mexico City Grand Prix.

== Complete Formula One results ==
Key

Key
Colour	Result
Gold	Winner
Silver	Second place
Bronze	Third place
Green	Other points position
Blue	Other classified position
Blue	Not classified, finished (NC)
Purple	Not classified, retired (Ret)
Red	Did not qualify (DNQ)
Black	Disqualified (DSQ)
White	Did not start (DNS)
White	Race cancelled (C)
Blank	Did not practice (DNP)
Blank	Excluded (EX)
Blank	Did not arrive (DNA)
Blank	Withdrawn (WD)
Blank	Did not enter (empty cell)
Annotation	Meaning
P	Pole position
F	Fastest lap
Superscript number	Points-scoring position in sprint

Year	Chassis	Engine	Tyres	Drivers	1	2	3	4	5	6	7	8	9	10	11	12	13	14	15	16	17	18	19	20	21	22	Points	WCC
2020	AT01	Honda RA620H; 1.6 V6 t	P		AUT	STY	HUN	GBR	70A	ESP	BEL	ITA	TUS	RUS	EIF	POR	EMI	TUR	BHR	SKH	ABU						107	7th
2020	AT01	Honda RA620H; 1.6 V6 t	P	(France) Pierre Gasly	7	15	Ret	7	11	9	8	1	Ret	9	6	5	Ret	13	6	11	8						107	7th
2020	AT01	Honda RA620H; 1.6 V6 t	P	(Russia) Daniil Kvyat	12†	10	12	Ret	10	12	11	9	7	8	15	19	4	12	11	7	11						107	7th
2021	AT02	Honda RA621H; 1.6 V6 t	P		BHR	EMI	POR	ESP	MON	AZE	FRA	STY	AUT	GBR	HUN	BEL	NED	ITA	RUS	TUR	USA	MXC	SAP	QAT	SAU	ABU	142	6th
2021	AT02	Honda RA621H; 1.6 V6 t	P	(France) Pierre Gasly	17†	7	10	10	6	3	7	Ret	9	11	5^{F}	6^{‡}	4	Ret	13	6	Ret	4	7	11	6	5	142	6th
2021	AT02	Honda RA621H; 1.6 V6 t	P	(Japan) Yuki Tsunoda	9	12	15	Ret	16	7	13	10	12	10	6	15	Ret	DNS	17	14	9	Ret	15	13	14	4	142	6th
2022	AT03	Red Bull RBPTH001; 1.6 V6 t	P		BHR	SAU	AUS	EMI	MIA	ESP	MON	AZE	CAN	GBR	AUT	FRA	HUN	BEL	NED	ITA	SIN	JPN	USA	MXC	SAP	ABU	35	9th
2022	AT03	Red Bull RBPTH001; 1.6 V6 t	P	(France) Pierre Gasly	Ret	8	9	12	Ret	13	11	5	14	Ret	15	12	12	9	11	8	10	18	14	11	14	14	35	9th
2022	AT03	Red Bull RBPTH001; 1.6 V6 t	P	(Japan) Yuki Tsunoda	8	DNS	15	7	12	10	17	13	Ret	14	16	Ret	19	13	Ret	14	Ret	13	10	Ret	17	11	35	9th
2023	AT04	Honda RBPTH001; 1.6 V6 t	P		BHR	SAU	AUS	AZE	MIA	MON	ESP	CAN	AUT	GBR	HUN	BEL	NED	ITA	SIN	JPN	QAT	USA	MXC	SAP	LVG	ABU	25	8th
2023	AT04	Honda RBPTH001; 1.6 V6 t	P	(Japan) Yuki Tsunoda	11	11	10	10	11	15	12	14	19	16	15	10	15	DNS	Ret	12	15	8^{F}	12	9^{6}	18†	8	25	8th
2023	AT04	Honda RBPTH001; 1.6 V6 t	P	(Netherlands) Nyck de Vries	14	14	15†	Ret	18	12	14	18	17	17													25	8th
2023	AT04	Honda RBPTH001; 1.6 V6 t	P	(Australia) Daniel Ricciardo											13	16	WD					15	7	13	14	11	25	8th
2023	AT04	Honda RBPTH001; 1.6 V6 t	P	(New Zealand) Liam Lawson													13	11	9	11	17						25	8th

Notes

- ^{†} – Driver did not finish the Grand Prix but was classified as they completed over 90% of the race distance.
- ^{‡} – Half points awarded as less than 75% of the race distance was completed.
