= Graham Watson (motorsport) =

New Zealand mechanic

- Born: 24 June 1967 (age 57); Pukekohe, New Zealand
- Employer: Formula One
- Title: Associate Director of Race Operations

Graham Watson (born 24 June 1967) is the Associate Director of Race Operations at Formula One and the former team manager of the Scuderia AlphaTauri Formula One team. Though born and raised in New Zealand, Watson is a citizen of the United Kingdom.

== Career ==
From an early age Watson had deep interest in motorsport, he took part in rallying events in his native New Zealand as a driver and co-driver. This led to Watson deciding to pursue a career in motorsport but as a mechanic, where he moved to the UK to work with the Ford World Rally Team. Eventually Watson decided to make the switch to single seaters, where he joined Paul Stewart Racing in Formula 3000. He then made to the step up to F1 where he joined Benetton in 1996 and then later BAR Honda in 2001. Watson remained at the Brackley outfit for eight years as it transitioned into Honda and later Brawn GP where he won a championship as Engineering Coordinator. Seeking a new challenge, he then moved to the fledging Lotus Racing as team manager before moving to Toro Rosso in 2014 where he remained until 2023 under the guise of Scuderia AlphaTauri. In that role he represented the team in discussions with the FIA and Sporting Working group as well as managing garage and logistical operations.

In 2024, Watson took up a role as Associate Director of Race Operations at Formula One.
