= 2021 Styrian Grand Prix =

8th round of the 2021 Formula One season

Race 8 of 22 (Note: At the time of the event Formula One planned to hold twenty-three Grands Prix.) in the 2021 Formula One World Championship
← Previous race	Next race →
- Layout of the Spielberg circuit in 2021

Race details
- Date: 27 June 2021
- Official name: Formula 1 BWT Großer Preis der Steiermark 2021
- Location: Red Bull Ring; Spielberg, Austria
- Course: Permanent racing circuit
- Course length: 4.318 km (2.683 miles)
- Distance: 71 laps, 306.452 km (190.420 miles)
- Weather: Partly cloudy. Ambient temperature: 25 to 29 °C (77 to 84 °F); Surface temperature: 48 to 56 °C (118 to 133 °F)
- Attendance: 15,000

Pole position
Driver	(Netherlands) Max Verstappen	Red Bull Racing-Honda
- Time: 1:03.841

Fastest lap
Driver	(United Kingdom) Lewis Hamilton	Mercedes
- Time: 1:07.058 on lap 71

Podium
First	(Netherlands) Max Verstappen	Red Bull Racing-Honda
Second	(United Kingdom) Lewis Hamilton	Mercedes
Third	(Finland) Valtteri Bottas	Mercedes

The 2021 Styrian Grand Prix (officially known as the Formula 1 BWT Großer Preis der Steiermark 2021) was a Formula One motor race that took place on 27 June 2021 at the Red Bull Ring in Spielberg, Austria as the eighth round of the 2021 Formula One World Championship. It was the second and final Styrian Grand Prix, and the thirty-fourth Grand Prix held at the venue. The event was added to the schedule after other races were cancelled because of the COVID-19 pandemic, forming the second leg of a series of three races on back-to-back weekends. The race was won from pole position by Red Bull Racing driver Max Verstappen, who led every lap of the race. Lewis Hamilton, driving for the Mercedes team, finished second and set the fastest lap, with his teammate Valtteri Bottas finishing third.

== Background ==
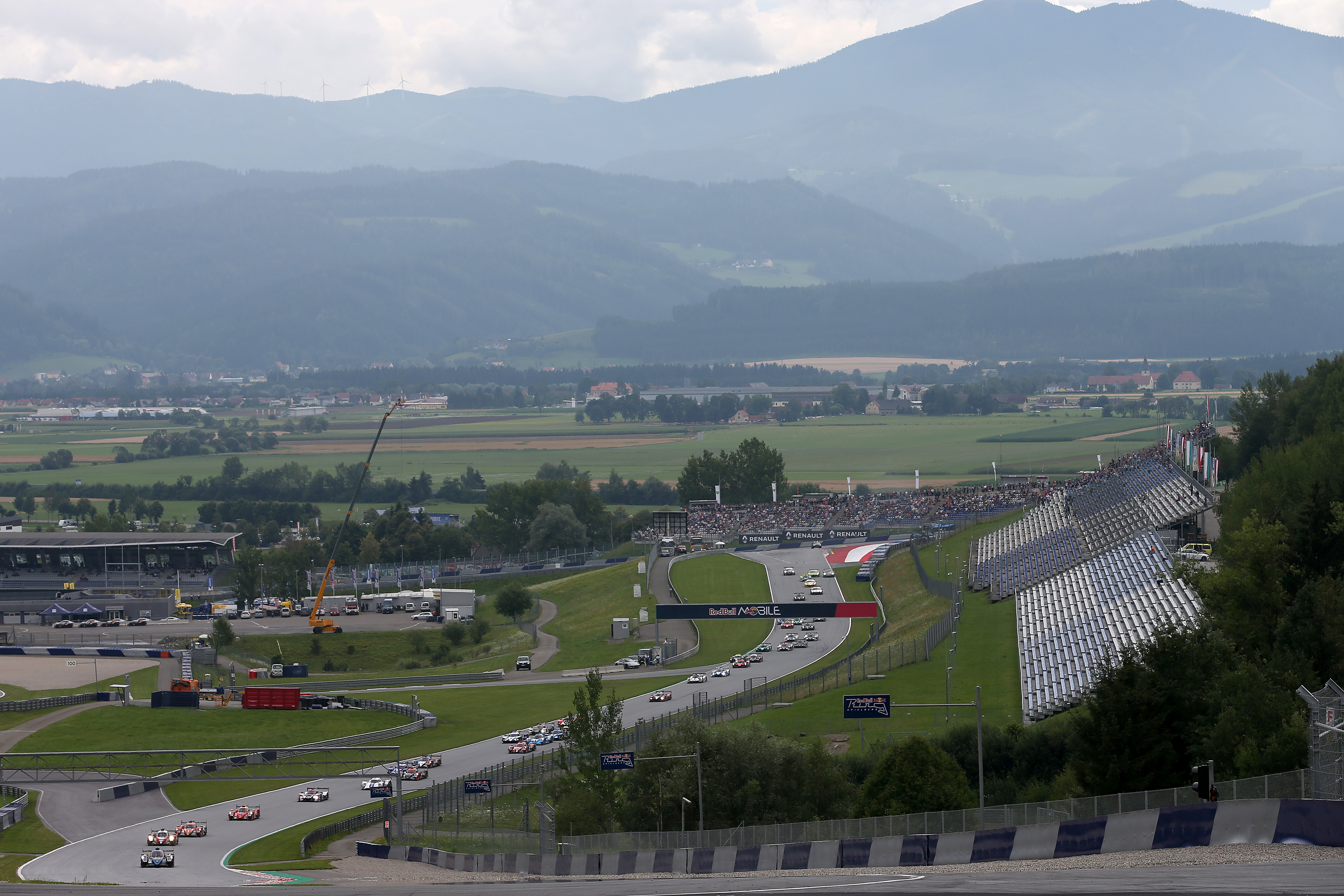
Spielberg is located in the Styrian Alps.

The event was held over the weekend of 25–27 June, and is officially named the Formula 1 BWT Großer Preis der Steiermark 2021. It was the eighth round of the 2021 Formula One World Championship, and the second Styrian Grand Prix following the first edition held the previous year. It was held at the 4.318-kilometre (2.683 mi), ten-corner Red Bull Ring in Spielberg, Austria, the sixteenth world championship Grand Prix held on the modern version of the circuit, and the thirty-fourth in total. Of the locations on the 2021 schedule, Spielberg falls behind only Mexico City in terms of altitude. Changes had been made to the verge and barrier at the second and third corners and to the kerb at the sixth turn since the previous year. It was hoped that the changes made would prevent drivers from gaining an advantage by leaving the track. The kerbs at the venue are known for the demand they place on the suspension of cars that run over them.

The event was added to the schedule after the Canadian Grand Prix was cancelled and the Turkish Grand Prix was postponed, both because of the COVID-19 pandemic. As a result of these changes, the Styrian Grand Prix formed the second leg of a series of three races on consecutive weekends, following the 2021 French Grand Prix in Le Castellet, Var and preceding the 2021 Austrian Grand Prix, which was also held in Spielberg. The addition of a fourth group of three back-to-back races to the already-crowded calendar received criticism, with concerns expressed over the workload and its effect on the mental health of workers who travel to the races. This race was held with a limited number of spectators in attendance, while the following week's Austrian Grand Prix had a much larger crowd. At the time outdoor events in Austria could have no more than three-thousand attendees, however the large size of the venue meant spectators could be split into five separate groups, allowing a crowd of fifteen-thousand. The 2021 W Series hosted its season's first round as a support race.

Sole Formula One tyre supplier Pirelli were expected to bring their middle three dry-weather tyre compounds in terms of hardness—the C2, C3, and C4—which were originally intended for the next round. Ten constructors and twenty drivers participated, with no changes from the season entry list. Robert Kubica drove for Alfa Romeo Racing in the first free practice session in place of Kimi Räikkönen. Max Verstappen entered the event leading the World Drivers' Championship, with a twelve-point advantage ahead of Lewis Hamilton, while Red Bull Racing led the World Constructors' Championship by thirty-seven points from the Mercedes team. Verstappen, who had won Grands Prix at the circuit twice before, felt that the race would be close between Red Bull and Mercedes and that understanding the weather conditions would be important. Hamilton described Spielberg as "a power-hungry circuit", believing that Red Bull had a straight-line speed advantage and that it would be necessary for Mercedes to "maximise absolutely everything" to compete with them. Hamilton had swapped chassis with teammate Valtteri Bottas for the previous round at Le Castellet, but in Spielberg the pair returned to using the chassis they had used from the third-through-sixth rounds. Red Bull had a new floor and diffuser at this event, which created more downforce in slower corners and allowed the team to reduce drag elsewhere on the car.

== Practice ==
The first practice session passed without major incident and ended with Red Bull's Verstappen fastest ahead of Scuderia AlphaTauri's Pierre Gasly and Mercedes driver Hamilton. Sergio Pérez and Carlos Sainz Jr were amongst the drivers who had spins during this session. There was some very light rain during Friday's running which did not effect proceedings significantly.

Verstappen set the fastest official time in the second free practice session with Daniel Ricciardo second for McLaren and the Alpine team’s Esteban Ocon third, after Hamilton had a faster lap time disallowed for a track limits violation. Bottas spun in the pit lane after leaving in second gear; he was penalised for this, being required to start from three positions further back in the race and having two penalty points added to his FIA Super Licence. Gasly did not participate in this session because the AlphaTauri mechanics were attempting to diagnose a fault with his car's engine.

Hamilton set the fastest lap in the third practice session followed by Verstappen in second, and Bottas in third. Verstappen felt that Hamilton had impeded him during his fast runs. Bottas and Gasly nearly collided in the pit lane while Gasly was exiting his pit garage.

== Qualifying ==
Qualifying started at 15:00 local time on the Saturday. Qualifying was held under clear skies with ambient temperatures between 25 and 27 °C (77 and 81 °F) and surface temperatures between 53 and 55 °C (127 and 131 °F). The session is composed of three segments. (Note: The first lasts eighteen minutes, the second fifteen minutes, and the final twelve minutes.) At the end of the first two parts the five slowest drivers have their qualifying positions set and are prevented from participating in the rest of the qualifying session. (Note: Drivers who fail to set a lap time within 107% of the fastest time set during the first segment may be prevented from starting the race.) The final segment determines the top ten qualifying positions. The qualifying results are then used to determine the starting order of the race.

Verstappen set the fastest time of the final segment of qualifying to claim pole position. This was the sixth pole of Verstappen's Formula One career, and his third of 2021. Both of Verstappen's lap times during the final segment of qualifying were fast enough to secure pole position, and no other driver set a time under sixty-four seconds. Bottas qualified second, with his penalty pushing him back to fifth, with Hamilton qualifying third and Lando Norris fourth. McLaren had an advantage over Scuderia Ferrari in qualifying because of the design of their drag reduction system. Pérez was only able to make one run on new soft tyres during the final segment after he had to use a set during the first segment. The soft-compound tyres were believed to give an advantage of around two-fifths of a second per lap over the medium-compound tyres. Bottas, Hamilton, Norris, and Verstappen only made one run in the first segment as their times were sufficient to progress. The Mercedes team had preserved tyres across prior segments to allow Hamilton three fresh sets for the final qualifying segment. Congestion was sometimes an issue during qualifying on the short layout, with Yuki Tsunoda, who qualified eighth, ordered to start from three places further back as a penalty for holding up Bottas. Hamilton passed several other drivers during the final outlap of qualifying because he was worried about maintaining tyre temperature, however this resulted in his tyres getting dirt on them, which slowed him down. Gasly was fast enough to qualify sixth for AlphaTauri, giving him the most top-six starts in a single season of any Minardi, Toro Rosso, or AlphaTauri driver at that time. Charles Leclerc qualified seventh for Scuderia Ferrari. Fernando Alonso set the ninth fastest time of the final session, having beaten George Russell out of the second session by less than a hundredth of a second. Lance Stroll was further from the pace in the final segment and qualified tenth for the Aston Martin team. A slow final sector in an understeering Ferrari meant Sainz qualified twelfth. Ricciardo qualified thirteenth with a time half-a-second slower than teammate Norris in the second segment, which McLaren believed was a result of the circuit's heavy braking zones. Sebastian Vettel experienced issues with understeer and had his best lap in the second segment deleted after he went off the track, meaning he qualified fourteenth. Nicholas Latifi encountered traffic during his final attempt, and qualified sixteenth. Ocon qualified seventeenth after he was nearly a quarter of a second slower than teammate Alonso in the first segment. Räikkönen went off into the gravel trap at the fourth corner during his first attempt, and qualified eighteenth with a fastest time in the first segment a third of a second slower than teammate Antonio Giovinazzi, who qualified fifteenth after losing time through the last turn. The Haas Formula cars were the slowest, with Mick Schumacher quicker than Nikita Mazepin. Haas were the only team whose drivers were over a second slower than Verstappen's benchmark in the first segment, with Schumacher six-tenths of a second behind Räikkönen.

=== Qualifying classification ===
Pos.	No.	Driver	Constructor	Qualifying times			Final grid
Pos.	No.	Driver	Constructor	Q1	Q2	Q3	Final grid
1	33	(Netherlands) Max Verstappen	Red Bull Racing-Honda	1:04.489	1:04.433	1:03.841	1
2	77	(Finland) Valtteri Bottas	Mercedes	1:04.537	1:04.443	1:04.035	5^{a}
3	44	(United Kingdom) Lewis Hamilton	Mercedes	1:04.672	1:04.512	1:04.067	2
4	4	(United Kingdom) Lando Norris	McLaren-Mercedes	1:04.584	1:04.298	1:04.120	3
5	11	(Mexico) Sergio Pérez	Red Bull Racing-Honda	1:04.638	1:04.197	1:04.168	4
6	10	(France) Pierre Gasly	AlphaTauri-Honda	1:04.765	1:04.429	1:04.236	6
7	16	(Monaco) Charles Leclerc	Ferrari	1:04.745	1:04.646	1:04.472	7
8	22	(Japan) Yuki Tsunoda	AlphaTauri-Honda	1:04.608	1:04.631	1:04.514	11^{b}
9	14	(Spain) Fernando Alonso	Alpine-Renault	1:04.971	1:04.582	1:04.574	8
10	18	(Canada) Lance Stroll	Aston Martin-Mercedes	1:04.821	1:04.663	1:04.708	9
11	63	(United Kingdom) George Russell	Williams-Mercedes	1:05.033	1:04.671	N/A	10
12	55	(Spain) Carlos Sainz Jr.	Ferrari	1:04.859	1:04.800	N/A	12
13	3	(Australia) Daniel Ricciardo	McLaren-Mercedes	1:05.142	1:04.808	N/A	13
14	5	(Germany) Sebastian Vettel	Aston Martin-Mercedes	1:05.051	1:04.875	N/A	14
15	99	(Italy) Antonio Giovinazzi	Alfa Romeo Racing-Ferrari	1:05.092	1:04.913	N/A	15
16	6	(Canada) Nicholas Latifi	Williams-Mercedes	1:05.175	N/A	N/A	16
17	31	(France) Esteban Ocon	Alpine-Renault	1:05.217	N/A	N/A	17
18	7	(Finland) Kimi Räikkönen	Alfa Romeo Racing-Ferrari	1:05.429	N/A	N/A	18
19	47	(Germany) Mick Schumacher	Haas-Ferrari	1:06.041	N/A	N/A	19
20	9	(Russian Automobile Federation) Nikita Mazepin (Note: Mazepin is Russian, but he competed as a neutral competitor using the designation RAF (Russian Automobile Federation), as the Court of Arbitration for Sport upheld a ban on Russia competing at World Championships. The ban was implemented by the World Anti-Doping Agency in response to the state-sponsored doping program of Russian athletes.)	Haas-Ferrari	1:06.192	N/A	N/A	20
107% time: 1:09.003

==== Notes ====
- ^a – Valtteri Bottas received a three-place grid penalty for dangerous driving in the pit lane during second practice.
- ^b – Yuki Tsunoda received a three-place grid penalty for impeding Valtteri Bottas during qualifying.

== Race ==
The race started at 15:00 local time on the Sunday. It lasted seventy-one laps for a total distance of 306.452 kilometres (190.420 mi). The ambient temperature before the start was 26.4 °C (79.5 °F), and during the race there were ambient temperatures between 25 and 29 °C (77 and 84 °F) and surface temperatures between 48 and 56 °C (118 and 133 °F). Verstappen and the two Mercedes drivers started on the medium compound tyres. The rest of the top-ten qualifiers started on the soft tyres, while those who did not reach the final segment of qualifying mostly opted for the mediums. Räikkönen was the only driver who started on the hardest tyre compound. Verstappen started quickly, allowing him to prevent second-placed Hamilton from passing him into the first turn. Pérez passed Norris at the third corner, but Norris regained the position at the fourth turn. Scuderia Ferrari driver Leclerc collided with Gasly on the first lap, causing a puncture which forced AlphaTauri to retire the car with damaged suspension, whilst Ferrari replaced Leclerc's car's front wing in a pit stop at the end of the first lap, where they also fitted new hard tyres. The incident also resulted in Giovinazzi spinning as his car touched Gasly's ailing machine. Stroll overtook Alonso on the first lap, while Latifi also made a pit stop because his car's rear-right tyre was punctured. Ricciardo passed Tsunoda on the first lap at the second-to-last corner, whilst Räikkönen gained four places over the course of the first lap.

Giovinazzi overtook Schumacher on third lap and Mazepin on the fourth lap to move up into fifteenth position. Ricciardo was overtaken by four other drivers on the seventh lap after a technical issue caused his McLaren to lose power. Ricciardo, who had moved up into eighth place from a starting position of thirteenth before his car lost power, described his start as "awesome" and the seventh-lap issues as "disheartening". Pérez overtook Norris for third place on the tenth lap, with Bottas following him through a lap later, with Norris focusing on managing his car's tyres. By this point Verstappen was ten seconds ahead of his teammate. Leclerc overtook Schumacher on the thirteenth lap and Mazepin on the fourteenth lap to move up into sixteenth position. Although cloud cover appeared over the track during the race, the weather remained warm enough for teams to have concerns about cooling their cars. Verstappen built a four-second lead from Hamilton and then slowed to the same pace as his pursuer. Mazepin made a pit stop on the twenty-first lap. Leclerc overtook Giovinazzi on the twenty-second lap and Ocon on the twenty-fourth lap to move up into fourteenth position. Verstappen's lead increased on the twenty-fifth lap when Hamilton almost lost control of his car following a tyre vibration.

At the end of the twenty-fifth lap Russell, who had been in eighth position, had a pit stop which lasted eighteen seconds while the team recharged his car's pneumatic system. Russell's teammate Latifi also made a pit stop on the twenty-fifth lap. Giovinazzi had dropped behind Schumacher when he made a pit stop on the twenty-third lap, but got back past the Haas driver on the twenty-sixth lap. Pérez came into the pits for new tyres at the end of the twenty-sixth lap, however an issue changing the rear-left wheel meant his pit stop was slow, and when Bottas (who pitted one lap later) emerged from the pit lane he had gotten ahead of Pérez. Tsunoda also made a pit stop on the twenty-sixth lap, while Alonso and Vettel had pit stops on the twenty-seventh lap. Before Pérez pitted Hamilton could not make a pit stop without emerging behind the Red Bull driver. Hamilton made his first pit stop at the end of the twenty-eighth lap, with Verstappen doing the same on the following lap. Verstappen's existing advantage and the concise length of the circuit meant that Hamilton could not utilise the greater grip of fresh tyres to get ahead of Verstappen while the Red Bull was in the pit lane. Stroll also made a pit stop on the twenty-eighth lap, while Norris made his on the thirty-first lap and Schumacher made his on the thirty-third.

Russell retired on the thirty-sixth lap after his car's engine had hydraulic problems. The outcome was disappointing for the Williams team, who had not scored a point since the 2019 German Grand Prix and were running in a points-scoring position before the issues emerged. Räikkönen and Ocon made pit stops on the thirty-sixth lap. Leclerc made a second pit stop on the thirty-seventh lap; he exited the pitlane in fourteenth place. Sainz and Ricciardo made pit stops on the forty-first lap, while Leclerc overtook Räikkönen for thirteenth position and Schumacher overtook Mazepin for sixteenth. Verstappen reported some brake problems during the latter part of the race, which may have been related to the kerbing at the ninth and tenth corners. Alonso complained that having to slow down for blue flags when Verstappen lapped him had allowed Sainz to get ahead of him. Sainz overtook Stroll for sixth place on the forty-fourth lap and Leclerc overtook Giovinazzi for eleventh on the forty-fifth. Leclerc overtook Vettel for tenth on the forty-ninth lap, the Ferrari passing the Aston Martin between the third and fourth turns. Ricciardo overtook Ocon for fourteenth position on the fifty-third lap. Pérez made a second pit stop at the end of the fifty-fourth lap, after which he was twenty seconds behind Bottas; the new tyres allowed him to close the gap to less than two seconds by the end of the race. Hamilton noted that the rubber of his front-right tyre was blistering around the fifty-fifth lap, although the team were wary of making another pit stop too soon due to the possibility of rain arriving before the end of the race.

Verstappen won the race at an average speed of 223.373 kilometres per hour (138.798 mph; 62.048 m/s) and was over thirty-five seconds in front of second-placed Hamilton, with Bottas in third ahead of Pérez. Norris remained in fifth until the end, aided by a relatively late pit stop for new tyres. Pérez was nearly twenty-seven seconds ahead of Norris at the finish. Leclerc climbed through the order to finish seventh after making a pit stop to repair damage sustained in the collision with Gasly. After his second pit stop he overtook both Alfa Romeos and Aston Martins as well as Tsunoda and Alonso. Leclerc overtook Tsunoda on the fifty-fourth lap, Alonso on the fifty-fifth lap, and Stroll on the fifty-ninth. Leclerc felt that his recovery from the back of the field was amongst his best drives in a Formula One race. His Ferrari teammate Sainz finished one place ahead of him, having gained six places from his starting position. Sainz was slowed when he found himself a lap behind Hamilton, who was on older tyres. Hamilton eventually allowed Sainz through to unlap himself. Stroll, Alonso, and Tsunoda made up the rest of the top-ten points-scoring positions. Räikkönen overtook his teammate Giovinazzi on the fifty-seventh lap before passing Vettel for eleventh on the sixty-seventh lap. Ricciardo finished thirteenth after spending much of the race unable to pass slower cars, having passed Giovinazzi on the fifty-eighth lap. The McLaren driver felt he could have scored points without the engine problem his car had early in the race. Latifi finished seventeenth after he overtook Mazepin on the sixty-third lap. Mazepin was the last finisher in eighteenth, forty-two seconds behind teammate Schumacher. The Haas driver suggested he was slower because his car was heavier. Some light rainfall was reported towards the end of the race, but it did not significantly effect proceedings.

Verstappen extended his lead over Hamilton in the Drivers' Championship to eighteen points while Red Bull extended their lead over Mercedes in the Constructors' Championship to forty. The low drag setup on the Red Bull RB16B's rear wing gave them a speed advantage. Red Bull had installed upgrades on Verstappen's car before the event. Hamilton said that Red Bull had "made some big improvements over the last couple of races and it's impossible to keep up"; he wanted Mercedes to develop upgrades to make their car faster, but Mercedes had no plans to do so. Mercedes suspected that their car setup may have overemphasised speed over a single lap at the expense of being fast for an entire race distance. Mercedes wanted to reduce rear-tyre wear for the next race at the same venue. Hamilton claimed the additional point for setting the fastest lap of the race, setting said time on the seventy-first and final lap of the race at an average speed of 231.811 kilometres per hour (144.041 mph; 64.392 m/s); he was seventeen seconds behind Verstappen when Mercedes called him in to the pits towards the end of the race for a new set of tyres which would enable him to do so. This was the forty-third time Hamilton had finished a Grand Prix in second place, equalling the record held by Michael Schumacher. Verstappen performed celebratory burnouts after the finish, and was warned by officials to not repeat such an act at future events. Red Bull team principal Christian Horner praised Verstappen, calling it "the most dominant win we had all year against Mercedes." This was the first time since the 2013 season that Mercedes had not won in four consecutive races. Verstappen led every lap and lapped all the drivers apart from Hamilton, Pérez and Bottas. This was the first time in 2021 that a McLaren had not finished on the lead lap. This was Verstappen's second win in a row after winning in France a week before this race, marking the first time Verstappen had won two consecutive Grands Prix.

=== Race classification ===
Pos.	No.	Driver	Constructor	Laps	Time/Retired	Grid	Points
1	33	(Netherlands) Max Verstappen	Red Bull Racing-Honda	71	1:22:18.925	1	25
2	44	(United Kingdom) Lewis Hamilton	Mercedes	71	+35.743	2	19^{1}
3	77	(Finland) Valtteri Bottas	Mercedes	71	+46.907	5	15
4	11	(Mexico) Sergio Pérez	Red Bull Racing-Honda	71	+47.434	4	12
5	4	(United Kingdom) Lando Norris	McLaren-Mercedes	70	+1 lap	3	10
6	55	(Spain) Carlos Sainz Jr.	Ferrari	70	+1 lap	12	8
7	16	(Monaco) Charles Leclerc	Ferrari	70	+1 lap	7	6
8	18	(Canada) Lance Stroll	Aston Martin-Mercedes	70	+1 lap	9	4
9	14	(Spain) Fernando Alonso	Alpine-Renault	70	+1 lap	8	2
10	22	(Japan) Yuki Tsunoda	AlphaTauri-Honda	70	+1 lap	11	1
11	7	(Finland) Kimi Räikkönen	Alfa Romeo Racing-Ferrari	70	+1 lap	18	
12	5	(Germany) Sebastian Vettel	Aston Martin-Mercedes	70	+1 lap	14	
13	3	(Australia) Daniel Ricciardo	McLaren-Mercedes	70	+1 lap	13	
14	31	(France) Esteban Ocon	Alpine-Renault	70	+1 lap	17	
15	99	(Italy) Antonio Giovinazzi	Alfa Romeo Racing-Ferrari	70	+1 lap	15	
16	47	(Germany) Mick Schumacher	Haas-Ferrari	69	+2 laps	19	
17	6	(Canada) Nicholas Latifi	Williams-Mercedes	68	+3 laps	16	
18	9	(Russian Automobile Federation) Nikita Mazepin	Haas-Ferrari	68	+3 laps	20	
Ret	63	(United Kingdom) George Russell	Williams-Mercedes	36	Power unit	10	
Ret	10	(France) Pierre Gasly	AlphaTauri-Honda	1	Collision	6	
Fastest lap: (United Kingdom) Lewis Hamilton (Mercedes) – 1:07.058 (lap 71)

==== Notes ====
- ^1 – Includes one point for fastest lap.

== Championship standings after the race ==
Drivers' Championship standings

	Pos.	Driver	Points
Unchanged	1	(Netherlands) Max Verstappen	156
Unchanged	2	(United Kingdom) Lewis Hamilton	138
Unchanged	3	(Mexico) Sergio Pérez	96
Unchanged	4	(United Kingdom) Lando Norris	86
Unchanged	5	(Finland) Valtteri Bottas	74

Constructors' Championship standings

	Pos.	Constructor	Points
Unchanged	1	(Austria) Red Bull Racing-Honda	252
Unchanged	2	(Germany) Mercedes	212
Unchanged	3	(United Kingdom) McLaren-Mercedes	120
Unchanged	4	(Italy) Ferrari	108
Unchanged	5	(Italy) AlphaTauri-Honda	46

- Note: Only the top five positions are included for both sets of standings.

== See also ==
- 2021 W Series Spielberg round

== Notes ==
Previous race: 2021 French Grand Prix	FIA Formula One World Championship; 2021 season	Next race: 2021 Austrian Grand Prix
Previous race: 2020 Styrian Grand Prix	Styrian Grand Prix	Next race: None
