= 2020 Styrian Grand Prix =

2nd round of the 2020 Formula One season

Race 2 of 17 (Note: The outbreak of the COVID-19 pandemic saw several Grands Prix cancelled or rescheduled. The revised calendar consisted of seventeen races.) in the 2020 Formula One World Championship
← Previous race	Next race →
- Layout of the Red Bull Ring

Race details
- Date: 12 July 2020
- Official name: Formula 1 Pirelli Grosser Preis der Steiermark 2020
- Location: Red Bull Ring; Spielberg, Styria, Austria
- Course: Permanent racing facility
- Course length: 4.318 km (2.683 miles)
- Distance: 71 laps, 306.452 km (190.420 miles)
- Weather: Sunny
- Attendance: 0 (Note: The Grand Prix was held behind closed doors due to the COVID-19 pandemic in Austria.)

Pole position
Driver	(United Kingdom) Lewis Hamilton	Mercedes
- Time: 1:19.273

Fastest lap
Driver	(Spain) Carlos Sainz Jr.	McLaren-Renault
- Time: 1:05.619 on lap 68 (lap record)

Podium
First	(United Kingdom) Lewis Hamilton	Mercedes
Second	(Finland) Valtteri Bottas	Mercedes
Third	(Netherlands) Max Verstappen	Red Bull Racing-Honda

The 2020 Styrian Grand Prix (officially known as the Formula 1 Pirelli Großer Preis der Steiermark 2020) was a Formula One motor race that took place on 12 July 2020 at the Red Bull Ring in Spielberg, Styria, Austria. It was the second round of the 2020 Formula One World Championship. It was the first running of the Styrian Grand Prix, and was held exactly one week after the 2020 Austrian Grand Prix on the same track, due to the rescheduling of the season because of the COVID-19 pandemic.

In the race, Lewis Hamilton won from pole position, ahead of his teammate Valtteri Bottas and Max Verstappen. The result saw Hamilton close to within 6 points of the championship leader, Bottas, and Mercedes extend their lead in the Constructors' Championship to 41 points.

== Background ==
=== Impact of the COVID-19 pandemic ===
The originally scheduled calendar for the 2020 championship was heavily affected by the COVID-19 pandemic. Several Grands Prix were cancelled or postponed after the planned opening round in Australia was called off two days before the race was due to take place, prompting the FIA to draft a new calendar. The start of the championship was delayed until 5 July, with the Red Bull Ring hosting the Austrian Grand Prix as the opening round of the championship. Organisers of the race signed a contract with Liberty Media, the sport's commercial rights holder, to host a second round at the circuit on 12 July (a week after the first race) to be known as the "Styrian Grand Prix". The race was named for Styria, the state of Austria that the Red Bull Ring is located in. The back-to-back Austrian races marked the first time that a country hosted back-to-back races in the same season since 1995 when Japan hosted the Pacific and Japanese Grands Prix. (Note: The 1995 Australian Grand Prix was the last of the 1995 season and the 1996 race was the first race of the 1996 season, which marks the last time a country hosted two consecutive Grands Prix, albeit not in the same season.) The race was also the first time in the sport's history that the same venue and circuit layout hosted back-to-back World Championship races.

=== Car upgrades ===
Ferrari brought and introduced a wide range of updates to the Ferrari SF1000. The upgrades were originally scheduled for the Hungarian Grand Prix but were brought forward after a poor performance at the Austrian Grand Prix. Mercedes trialed a reliability upgrade by testing new gearbox components designed to solve the electrical problems at the first race of the season. McLaren used a new chin spoiler design.

=== Championship standings before the race ===
After the first round at the 2020 Austrian Grand Prix, Valtteri Bottas led the championship by 7 points from Charles Leclerc of Scuderia Ferrari with Lando Norris of McLaren a further 2 points behind in third place. Defending Drivers' Champion Lewis Hamilton was fourth in the standings, 13 points off the championship lead. In the Constructors' Championship, defending champions Mercedes led the championship with 37 points, McLaren was in second with 26 points with Ferrari placed third with 19 points.

=== Entrants ===
The drivers and teams were the same as the season entry list with no additional stand-in drivers for the race. Jack Aitken and Robert Kubica drove in the first practice session for Williams and Alfa Romeo Racing respectively. Aitken replaced George Russell, while Kubica replaced Antonio Giovinazzi.

=== Tyres ===
The medium hardness selection of C2, C3 and C4 tyre compounds were made available for teams to use by Pirelli, the same compound selections used at the Austrian Grand Prix on the same circuit the week before.

== Practice ==
The first practice session ended with Sergio Pérez fastest for Racing Point ahead of Red Bull's Max Verstappen and Mercedes's Valtteri Bottas. Lando Norris was given a three-place grid penalty after overtaking another car under yellow flag conditions, which came after Nicholas Latifi was forced to pull over to the side of the track with gearbox issues. Kevin Magnussen was unable to set a lap time during the session due to battery problems.

The second practice session ended with Verstappen fastest, followed by Bottas and Pérez. Daniel Ricciardo's session ended early when his Renault R.S.20 left the track at turn nine and crashed heavily into the barriers at the exit of the corner, bringing out the red flags. Ricciardo confirmed over the radio that he was fine and was taken to the circuit's medical centre where he was declared fit to race. Lewis Hamilton finished the session in sixth, seven-tenths adrift of teammate Bottas. Alexander Albon recovered from a spin at turn three to record the seventh-fastest time, and complained about a "snappy" Red Bull RB16 – which then led to another spin into the gravel going through the turn 7–8 chicane with 15 minutes of the session to go. Lando Norris cited chest and back pain as the reason for doing fewer laps in practice than teammate Carlos Sainz Jr., however his condition had improved by the following morning.

The third practice session was cancelled due to heavy rain.

== Qualifying ==
=== Q1 and Q2 ===
The first qualifying session began at 15:46 local time, forty-six minutes after the session was originally scheduled to start. All drivers started on the wet compound tyres, and all would continue to use it for the entirety of qualifying. The track was extremely wet, with the cars prone to aquaplaning. The only major incident of the session came towards the end, when Antonio Giovinazzi lost control of his Alfa Romeo after turn seven; his car slid onto the grass and collided gently with a barrier, scattering some debris. Giovinazzi kept the engine running, but soon stopped at turn four, leading to the session being red-flagged with 13 seconds remaining. Giovinazzi was eliminated from Q1 along with Kimi Räikkönen, Sergio Pérez, Nicholas Latifi and Romain Grosjean, who had not set a lap due to an issue with his energy recovery system. George Russell reached Q2 for the first time in his career, the first time a Williams driver had achieved this since the 2018 Brazilian Grand Prix.

The rain intensity increased during Q2 however the session proceeded without incident. Those eliminated were Charles Leclerc, George Russell, Lance Stroll, Daniil Kvyat, and Kevin Magnussen.

=== Q3 ===
Heavy rain continued into Q3 but gradually decreased over the course of the session. At various points, Lewis Hamilton, Max Verstappen, and Valtteri Bottas were on provisional pole position. In the end, Hamilton took pole with a lap time of 1:19:273, over 1.2 seconds faster than his nearest rival, Verstappen, who spun on his final attempt. Carlos Sainz Jr. qualified third, the first driver to do so for McLaren on pace alone since Jenson Button at the 2014 British Grand Prix (Sainz's teammate Lando Norris had started third at the previous race, but had been promoted to that position after Hamilton received a penalty). Hamilton's teammate Bottas qualified in fourth place, followed by Esteban Ocon, Lando Norris, Alexander Albon, Pierre Gasly, Daniel Ricciardo, and Sebastian Vettel.

=== Post-qualifying ===
Norris's penalty issued during the first practice session demoted him from sixth to ninth on the grid. Three drivers were investigated for breaches of the sporting regulations after qualifying; Pérez for ignoring yellow flags during Q1, Räikkönen and Leclerc for breaches of red-flag protocol during Q1, and Leclerc again for impeding Kvyat during Q2. No action was taken regarding the first three allegations, however Leclerc was issued a three-place grid penalty for impeding Kvyat, demoting him from 11th to 14th on the grid. On the morning of the race, Giovinazzi received a five place grid penalty for an unscheduled gearbox change, whilst Romain Grosjean was forced to start from the pit lane due to a breach of parc fermé regulations by his team, who worked on his car for over 3 hours more than allowed by the regulations, without the presence of a scrutineer. Whilst the normal punishment in such cases is disqualification from the Grand Prix weekend, Grosjean avoided this as the team blamed an energy recovery system (ERS) water pump problem that had to be repaired in order to allow him to participate.

=== Qualifying classification ===
Pos.	No.	Driver	Constructor	Qualifying times			Final grid
Pos.	No.	Driver	Constructor	Q1	Q2	Q3	Final grid
1	44	(United Kingdom) Lewis Hamilton	Mercedes	1:18.188	1:17.825	1:19.273	1
2	33	(Netherlands) Max Verstappen	Red Bull Racing-Honda	1:18.297	1:17.938	1:20.489	2
3	55	(Spain) Carlos Sainz Jr.	McLaren-Renault	1:18.590	1:18.836	1:20.671	3
4	77	(Finland) Valtteri Bottas	Mercedes	1:18.791	1:18.657	1:20.701	4
5	31	(France) Esteban Ocon	Renault	1:19.687	1:18.764	1:20.922	5
6	4	(United Kingdom) Lando Norris	McLaren-Renault	1:18.504	1:18.448	1:20.925	9^{a}
7	23	(Thailand) Alexander Albon	Red Bull Racing-Honda	1:20.882	1:19.014	1:21.011	6
8	10	(France) Pierre Gasly	AlphaTauri-Honda	1:20.192	1:18.744	1:21.028	7
9	3	(Australia) Daniel Ricciardo	Renault	1:19.662	1:19.229	1:21.192	8
10	5	(Germany) Sebastian Vettel	Ferrari	1:20.243	1:19.545	1:21.651	10
11	16	(Monaco) Charles Leclerc	Ferrari	1:20.871	1:19.628	N/A	14^{b}
12	63	(United Kingdom) George Russell	Williams-Mercedes	1:20.382	1:19.636	N/A	11
13	18	(Canada) Lance Stroll	Racing Point-BWT Mercedes	1:19.697	1:19.645	N/A	12
14	26	(Russia) Daniil Kvyat	AlphaTauri-Honda	1:19.824	1:19.717	N/A	13
15	20	(Denmark) Kevin Magnussen	Haas-Ferrari	1:21.140	1:20.211	N/A	15
16	7	(Finland) Kimi Räikkönen	Alfa Romeo Racing-Ferrari	1:21.372	N/A	N/A	16
17	11	(Mexico) Sergio Pérez	Racing Point-BWT Mercedes	1:21.607	N/A	N/A	17
18	6	(Canada) Nicholas Latifi	Williams-Mercedes	1:21.759	N/A	N/A	18
19	99	(Italy) Antonio Giovinazzi	Alfa Romeo Racing-Ferrari	1:21.831	N/A	N/A	19^{c}
20	8	(France) Romain Grosjean	Haas-Ferrari	No time	N/A	N/A	PL^{d}
107% time: 1:23.661^{e}

==== Notes ====
- ^a – Lando Norris received a three-place grid penalty for overtaking under yellow flags during the first practice session.
- ^b – Charles Leclerc received a three-place grid penalty for impeding Daniil Kvyat during qualifying.
- ^c – Antonio Giovinazzi received a five-place grid penalty for an unscheduled gearbox change.
- ^d – Romain Grosjean was required to start from the pit lane after his team broke parc fermé regulations.
- ^e – As qualifying was held on a wet track, the 107% rule was not in force.

== Race ==
=== Race report ===
==== Opening laps ====
The race was run in dry conditions, in contrast to the entirely wet qualifying meaning all 20 drivers had a free choice of starting tyres as is permitted by the Sporting Regulations. Lewis Hamilton maintained his lead from pole. At turn one Sebastian Vettel fell to 12th place behind George Russell and Lance Stroll. In an attempt to overtake his teammate on the inside of turn three, Charles Leclerc collided with Vettel, breaking Vettel's rear wing. The safety car was then deployed to clear debris from the turn three incident. Both Ferraris entered the pits at the end of the opening lap and Vettel's car was retired from the race. Leclerc's car had suffered front wing and floor damage and his front wing was replaced. Racing resumed on lap four. Russell, running in 11th place, left the track at turn six and went into the gravel. He was able to continue racing but rejoined at the back of the field in 18th place. At the end of lap four, Ferrari determined that the damage to Leclerc's car was too great to continue and he entered the pits to retire from the race. By lap eight, Carlos Sainz Jr. had fallen from third to fifth having been passed by Valtteri Bottas and Alexander Albon. On lap 14, Sergio Pérez entered the points positions by passing Lando Norris for tenth place, having started 17th.

==== Mid-race ====
On lap 24, second-placed Max Verstappen was the first driver to make a scheduled pit stop. On the following lap, Esteban Ocon entered the pits to retire from the race, his car suffering from a cooling issue. Race leader Hamilton pitted on lap 27, with teammate Bottas inheriting the lead. On lap 32, Sainz suffered a slow pit stop which would go on to cost him three positions, and two laps later Bottas made his first stop to hand the lead back to Hamilton. After all drivers had made their first stops, the order was Hamilton, Verstappen, Bottas, Albon, Ricciardo, Stroll, Pérez, Sainz, Norris and Pierre Gasly.

Pérez began to move further forward after his pit stop, passing teammate Stroll on lap 46 and then Daniel Ricciardo two laps later to claim fifth place. Pérez then set a number of fastest laps whilst moving closer towards Albon in fourth. Gasly later became the first driver to make two pit stops, having started seventh but fallen to 13th on his hard-compound tyres. He would only recover to 15th by the end of the race. On lap 62 Sainz let Norris pass for eighth.

==== Closing laps ====
Bottas, who had been slowly catching Verstappen since the first round of pit stops, overtook him for second place on lap 66. The two cars battled through the remainder of the lap, with Verstappen briefly reclaiming the place, before Bottas overtook again on the following lap. Verstappen and ninth-placed Sainz then pitted with two laps remaining in attempts to claim the fastest lap of the race, both drivers having large enough gaps behind as to avoid losing positions. On the penultimate lap, Pérez attempted an overtake on Albon for fourth place at turn four. The cars made contact resulting in Pérez breaking his front wing. The 15-second gap behind Pérez then began to close as the damage caused him to fall back. Stroll, who had been close behind Ricciardo for almost 30 laps, made an overtake attempt for sixth place at turn three, running deep and causing both drivers to take to the runoff area. Stroll took the position and the move caused Ricciardo to fall to eighth place behind Norris. On the final lap, Norris passed Stroll for sixth place on the straight after turn three, before catching the ailing Pérez at the final corner to take fifth.

Hamilton took the chequered flag to claim his first victory of the season and the 85th of his career, followed by Bottas and Verstappen to complete the podium, with Albon and Norris behind. Pérez, Stroll and Ricciardo crossed the finish line three-wide, separated by just over 0.2 seconds, but maintained those respective positions. Sainz finished ninth and claimed his first fastest lap in Formula One and the second consecutive fastest lap for McLaren. Sainz's fastest lap of 1:05 619 on lap 68 set a new race lap record for the circuit. Daniil Kvyat claimed the final point in tenth place.

==== Post-race ====
Stroll was investigated by the race stewards for his penultimate-lap overtake on Ricciardo, however this was deemed a racing incident and no further action was taken. Ricciardo later described the move as "desperate" and stated that he expected Stroll to receive a penalty. Leclerc apologised for causing the opening-lap collision with Vettel, remarking "I am just disappointed in myself. I've done a very bad job today. I let the team down." Vettel stated he was "very surprised" that Leclerc attempted the overtake, noting that the team had intended to assess the performance of the updates brought to the SF1000 for the race.

After the race, Renault launched a formal protest to the stewards regarding the legality of the Racing Point RP20 and its alleged similarities to the previous season's Mercedes AMG F1 W10 EQ Power+.

=== Race classification ===
Pos.	No.	Driver	Constructor	Laps	Time/Retired	Grid	Points
1	44	(United Kingdom) Lewis Hamilton	Mercedes	71	1:22:50.683	1	25
2	77	(Finland) Valtteri Bottas	Mercedes	71	+13.719	4	18
3	33	(Netherlands) Max Verstappen	Red Bull Racing-Honda	71	+33.698	2	15
4	23	(Thailand) Alexander Albon	Red Bull Racing-Honda	71	+44.400	6	12
5	4	(United Kingdom) Lando Norris	McLaren-Renault	71	+1:01.470	9	10
6	11	(Mexico) Sergio Pérez	Racing Point-BWT Mercedes	71	+1:02.387	17	8
7	18	(Canada) Lance Stroll	Racing Point-BWT Mercedes	71	+1:02.453	12	6
8	3	(Australia) Daniel Ricciardo	Renault	71	+1:02.591	8	4
9	55	(Spain) Carlos Sainz Jr.	McLaren-Renault	70	+1 lap	3	3^{1}
10	26	(Russia) Daniil Kvyat	AlphaTauri-Honda	70	+1 lap	13	1
11	7	(Finland) Kimi Räikkönen	Alfa Romeo Racing-Ferrari	70	+1 lap	16	
12	20	(Denmark) Kevin Magnussen	Haas-Ferrari	70	+1 lap	15	
13	8	(France) Romain Grosjean	Haas-Ferrari	70	+1 lap	PL	
14	99	(Italy) Antonio Giovinazzi	Alfa Romeo Racing-Ferrari	70	+1 lap	19	
15	10	(France) Pierre Gasly	AlphaTauri-Honda	70	+1 lap	7	
16	63	(United Kingdom) George Russell	Williams-Mercedes	69	+2 laps	11	
17	6	(Canada) Nicholas Latifi	Williams-Mercedes	69	+2 laps	18	
Ret	31	(France) Esteban Ocon	Renault	25	Overheating	5	
Ret	16	(Monaco) Charles Leclerc	Ferrari	4	Collision damage	14	
Ret	5	(Germany) Sebastian Vettel	Ferrari	1	Collision damage	10	
Fastest lap: (Spain) Carlos Sainz Jr. (McLaren-Renault) – 1:05.619 (lap 68)

==== Notes ====
- ^1 – Includes one point for fastest lap.

== Championship standings after the race ==
Drivers' Championship standings

	Pos.	Driver	Points
	1	(Finland) Valtteri Bottas	43
2	2	(United Kingdom) Lewis Hamilton	37
	3	(United Kingdom) Lando Norris	26
2	4	(Monaco) Charles Leclerc	18
1	5	(Mexico) Sergio Pérez	16

Constructors' Championship standings

	Pos.	Constructor	Points
	1	(Germany) Mercedes	80
	2	(United Kingdom) McLaren-Renault	39
6	3	(Austria) Red Bull Racing-Honda	27
	4	(United Kingdom) Racing Point-BWT Mercedes	22
2	5	(Italy) Ferrari	19

- Note: Only the top five positions are included for both sets of standings, which are accurate as of final declaration of results.

== See also ==
- 2020 2nd Spielberg Formula 2 round
- 2020 2nd Spielberg Formula 3 round

== Notes ==
Previous race: 2020 Austrian Grand Prix	FIA Formula One World Championship; 2020 season	Next race: 2020 Hungarian Grand Prix
Previous race: N/A	Styrian Grand Prix	Next race: 2021 Styrian Grand Prix
