= Styrian Grand Prix =

Formula One motor racing event

- Red Bull Ring

Race information
- Number of times held: 2
- First held: 2020
- Last held: 2021
- Most wins (drivers): (United Kingdom) Lewis Hamilton (Netherlands) Max Verstappen (1)
- Most wins (constructors): (Germany) Mercedes (Austria) Red Bull Racing (1)
- Circuit length: 4.318 km (2.683 miles)
- Race length: 306.452 km (190.420 miles)
- Laps: 71

Last race (2021)

Pole position
- (Netherlands) Max Verstappen; Red Bull Racing-Honda; 1:03.841

Podium
- 1. (Netherlands) M. Verstappen; Red Bull Racing-Honda; 1:22:18.925; 2. (United Kingdom) L. Hamilton; Mercedes; +35.743; 3. (Finland) V. Bottas; Mercedes; +46.907

Fastest lap
- (United Kingdom) Lewis Hamilton; Mercedes; 1:07.058

The Styrian Grand Prix (German: Großer Preis der Steiermark) was a Formula One motor racing event held at the Red Bull Ring, named after Styria, the province of Austria in which the circuit is located. Created in 2020 to maximize the number of Grands Prix during seasons affected by the COVID-19 pandemic, the Styrian event was held as a double-header with the Austrian Grand Prix at the same circuit on consecutive weekends.

== History ==
The COVID-19 pandemic in 2020 led to disruption of the original race calendar, with a number of events cancelled. The Styrian Grand Prix was added to the revised calendar as a "one-off" race, like several other new or returning Grands Prix, in order to make up for the loss of other races. After the 2020 Austrian Grand Prix, it was the second consecutive race at the Red Bull Ring. Mercedes's Lewis Hamilton qualified on pole and won the race.

Despite the original intention for the Styrian Grand Prix to be held as a one-off event in 2020, the event returned in 2021 as the eighth round of the championship to replace the Turkish Grand Prix which was postponed due to travel restrictions to manage the COVID-19 pandemic. Red Bull's Max Verstappen qualified on pole and went on to win the race.

The Styrian Grand Prix was discontinued for 2022 with the Red Bull Ring hosting only the Austrian Grand Prix.

== Winners ==
Both Styrian Grands Prix were held at the Red Bull Ring.

Year	Driver	Constructor	Report
2020	(United Kingdom) Lewis Hamilton	Mercedes	Report
2021	(Netherlands) Max Verstappen	Red Bull Racing-Honda	Report
