= 2021 Austrian Grand Prix =

9th round of the 2021 Formula One season

Race 9 of 22 (Note: At the time of the event Formula One planned to hold twenty-three Grands Prix.) in the 2021 Formula One World Championship
← Previous race	Next race →
- Layout of the Red Bull Ring

Race details
- Date: 4 July 2021
- Official name: Formula 1 BWT Großer Preis von Österreich 2021
- Location: Red Bull Ring; Spielberg, Styria, Austria
- Course: Permanent racing facility
- Course length: 4.318 km (2.683 miles)
- Distance: 71 laps, 306.452 km (190.420 miles)
- Weather: Partly cloudy
- Attendance: 132,000

Pole position
Driver	(Netherlands) Max Verstappen	Red Bull Racing-Honda
- Time: 1:03.720

Fastest lap
Driver	(Netherlands) Max Verstappen	Red Bull Racing-Honda
- Time: 1:06.200 on lap 62

Podium
First	(Netherlands) Max Verstappen	Red Bull Racing-Honda
Second	(Finland) Valtteri Bottas	Mercedes
Third	(United Kingdom) Lando Norris	McLaren-Mercedes

The 2021 Austrian Grand Prix (officially known as the Formula 1 BWT Großer Preis von Österreich 2021) was a Formula One motor race held on 4 July 2021 at the Red Bull Ring in Spielberg, Austria. The race was the ninth round of the 2021 Formula One World Championship, and the 35th running of the Austrian Grand Prix (the 34th as part of the World Championship since 1950) as well as the second of two consecutive races to be held at the Red Bull Ring with the Styrian Grand Prix held the week before at the same venue.

== Background ==
The drivers and teams were the same as the season entry list with no additional stand-in drivers for the race. Callum Ilott drove for Alfa Romeo Racing in place of Antonio Giovinazzi in the first free practice session, as well as Roy Nissany, who drove for Williams in place of George Russell, and Guanyu Zhou, who drove for Alpine in place of Fernando Alonso, making his Formula One practice debut.

Tyre supplier Pirelli brought the C3, C4, and C5 tyre compounds (designated hard, medium, and soft, respectively) for teams to use at the event. Initially, Pirelli selected C2, C3, and C4 tyre compounds before changing the tyre choices in accordance with the double event at the same venue, preceded the week before by the Styrian Grand Prix.

== Qualifying ==
Red Bull driver Max Verstappen set the fastest time in qualifying to take the seventh pole position of his career. He was followed by Lando Norris who qualified a career-best second and McLaren's best since 2012, and Verstappen's teammate Sergio Pérez in third place.

=== Qualifying classification ===
Pos.	No.	Driver	Constructor	Qualifying times			Final grid
Pos.	No.	Driver	Constructor	Q1	Q2	Q3	Final grid
1	33	(Netherlands) Max Verstappen	Red Bull Racing-Honda	1:04.249	1:03.927	1:03.720	1
2	4	(United Kingdom) Lando Norris	McLaren-Mercedes	1:04.345	1:04.415	1:03.768	2
3	11	(Mexico) Sergio Pérez	Red Bull Racing-Honda	1:04.833	1:04.483	1:03.990	3
4	44	(United Kingdom) Lewis Hamilton	Mercedes	1:04.506	1:04.258	1:04.014	4
5	77	(Finland) Valtteri Bottas	Mercedes	1:04.563	1:04.376	1:04.049	5
6	10	(France) Pierre Gasly	AlphaTauri-Honda	1:04.841	1:04.412	1:04.107	6
7	22	(Japan) Yuki Tsunoda	AlphaTauri-Honda	1:04.967	1:04.518	1:04.273	7
8	5	(Germany) Sebastian Vettel	Aston Martin-Mercedes	1:04.846	1:04.493	1:04.570	11^{a}
9	63	(United Kingdom) George Russell	Williams-Mercedes	1:04.907	1:04.553	1:04.591	8
10	18	(Canada) Lance Stroll	Aston Martin-Mercedes	1:04.927	1:04.547	1:04.618	9
11	55	(Spain) Carlos Sainz Jr.	Ferrari	1:04.596	1:04.559	N/A	10
12	16	(Monaco) Charles Leclerc	Ferrari	1:04.906	1:04.600	N/A	12
13	3	(Australia) Daniel Ricciardo	McLaren-Mercedes	1:04.977	1:04.719	N/A	13
14	14	(Spain) Fernando Alonso	Alpine-Renault	1:04.472	1:04.856	N/A	14
15	99	(Italy) Antonio Giovinazzi	Alfa Romeo Racing-Ferrari	1:04.782	1:05.083	N/A	15
16	7	(Finland) Kimi Räikkönen	Alfa Romeo Racing-Ferrari	1:05.009	N/A	N/A	16
17	31	(France) Esteban Ocon	Alpine-Renault	1:05.051	N/A	N/A	17
18	6	(Canada) Nicholas Latifi	Williams-Mercedes	1:05.195	N/A	N/A	18
19	47	(Germany) Mick Schumacher	Haas-Ferrari	1:05.427	N/A	N/A	19
20	9	(Russian Automobile Federation) Nikita Mazepin (Note: Nikita Mazepin is Russian, but he competed as a neutral competitor using the designation RAF (Russian Automobile Federation), as the Court of Arbitration for Sport upheld a ban on Russia competing at World Championships. The ban was implemented by the World Anti-Doping Agency in response to the state-sponsored doping program of Russian athletes.)	Haas-Ferrari	1:05.951	N/A	N/A	20
107% time: 1:08.746

==== Notes ====
- ^a – Sebastian Vettel received a three-place grid penalty for impeding Fernando Alonso during qualifying.

== Race ==
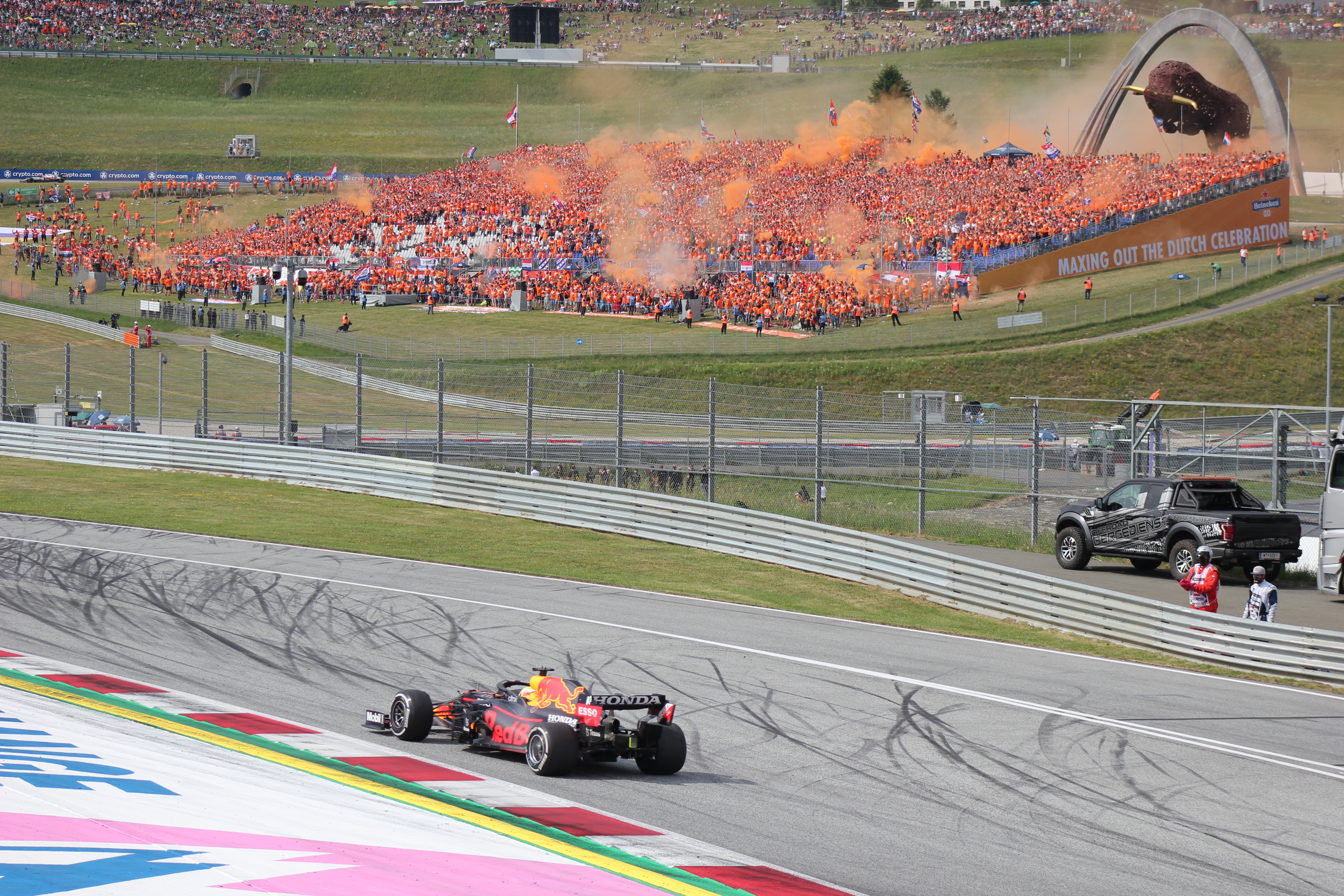
Race winner Max Verstappen after passing the chequered flag

The race started at 15:00 local time. Esteban Ocon retired on the first lap after colliding with the Alfa Romeo of Antonio Giovinazzi and breaking his front suspension. The safety car was deployed and the race was continued on lap 4. At the restart, Lando Norris, who was running 2nd at the time, tried to defend against the Red Bull of Sergio Pérez at turn 4, which resulted in Perez going off-track and joining back in tenth place. Norris was given a 5-second time penalty for the incident. On lap 31, Norris pitted to serve his penalty and to change his tyres. Perez received two 5-second penalties, having been judged to have "forced Leclerc off track" on two occasions. On the last lap, Kimi Räikkönen collided with the Aston Martin of Sebastian Vettel, meaning Vettel was unable to finish the race. By taking pole, fastest lap, win, and leading every lap of the race, Max Verstappen achieved his first career grand slam.

=== Race classification ===
Pos.	No.	Driver	Constructor	Laps	Time/Retired	Grid	Points
1	33	(Netherlands) Max Verstappen	Red Bull Racing-Honda	71	1:23:54.513	1	26^{1}
2	77	(Finland) Valtteri Bottas	Mercedes	71	+17.973	5	18
3	4	(United Kingdom) Lando Norris	McLaren-Mercedes	71	+20.019	2	15
4	44	(United Kingdom) Lewis Hamilton	Mercedes	71	+46.452	4	12
5	55	(Spain) Carlos Sainz Jr.	Ferrari	71	+57.144	10	10
6	11	(Mexico) Sergio Pérez	Red Bull Racing-Honda	71	+57.915^{2}	3	8
7	3	(Australia) Daniel Ricciardo	McLaren-Mercedes	71	+1:00.395	13	6
8	16	(Monaco) Charles Leclerc	Ferrari	71	+1:01.195	12	4
9	10	(France) Pierre Gasly	AlphaTauri-Honda	71	+1:01.844	6	2
10	14	(Spain) Fernando Alonso	Alpine-Renault	70	+1 lap	14	1
11	63	(United Kingdom) George Russell	Williams-Mercedes	70	+1 lap	8	
12	22	(Japan) Yuki Tsunoda	AlphaTauri-Honda	70	+1 lap^{3}	7	
13	18	(Canada) Lance Stroll	Aston Martin-Mercedes	70	+1 lap^{4}	9	
14	99	(Italy) Antonio Giovinazzi	Alfa Romeo Racing-Ferrari	70	+1 lap	15	
15	7	(Finland) Kimi Räikkönen	Alfa Romeo Racing-Ferrari	70	+1 lap^{5}	16	
16	6	(Canada) Nicholas Latifi	Williams-Mercedes	70	+1 lap^{6}	18	
17^{7}	5	(Germany) Sebastian Vettel	Aston Martin-Mercedes	69	Collision	11	
18	47	(Germany) Mick Schumacher	Haas-Ferrari	69	+2 laps	19	
19	9	(Russian Automobile Federation) Nikita Mazepin	Haas-Ferrari	69	+2 laps^{8}	20	
Ret	31	(France) Esteban Ocon	Alpine-Renault	0	Collision	17	
Fastest lap: (Netherlands) Max Verstappen (Red Bull Racing-Honda) – 1:06.200 (lap 62)

==== Notes ====
- ^1 – Includes one point for fastest lap.
- ^2 – Sergio Pérez received a 10-second time penalty for forcing Charles Leclerc out of the track twice.
- ^3 – Yuki Tsunoda received a five-second time penalty for crossing the line at the pit entry.
- ^4 – Lance Stroll received a five-second time penalty for speeding in the pit lane.
- ^5 – Kimi Räikkönen finished 16th on track, but received a post-race drive-through penalty converted to a 20-second time penalty for causing a collision with Sebastian Vettel. He was classified 15th due to Nicholas Latifi's penalty.
- ^6 – Nicholas Latifi finished 15th on track, but received a post-race 10-second stop-and-go time penalty converted to a 30-second time penalty for not respecting double yellow flags.
- ^7 – Sebastian Vettel was classified as he completed more than 90% of the race distance.
- ^8 – Nikita Mazepin received a post-race 10-second stop-and-go time penalty converted to a 30-second time penalty for not respecting double yellow flags. This made no difference as he finished last.

== Championship standings after the race ==
Drivers' Championship standings

	Pos.	Driver	Points
Unchanged	1	(Netherlands) Max Verstappen	182
Unchanged	2	(United Kingdom) Lewis Hamilton	150
Unchanged	3	(Mexico) Sergio Pérez	104
Unchanged	4	(United Kingdom) Lando Norris	101
Unchanged	5	(Finland) Valtteri Bottas	92

Constructors' Championship standings

	Pos.	Constructor	Points
Unchanged	1	(Austria) Red Bull Racing-Honda	286
Unchanged	2	(Germany) Mercedes	242
Unchanged	3	(United Kingdom) McLaren-Mercedes	141
Unchanged	4	(Italy) Ferrari	122
Unchanged	5	(Italy) AlphaTauri-Honda	48

- Note: Only the top five positions are included for both sets of standings.

== See also ==
- 2021 Spielberg Formula 3 round
- 2021 W Series Spielberg round 2

== Notes ==
Previous race: 2021 Styrian Grand Prix	FIA Formula One World Championship; 2021 season	Next race: 2021 British Grand Prix
Previous race: 2020 Austrian Grand Prix	Austrian Grand Prix	Next race: 2022 Austrian Grand Prix
