= 2020 Formula One pre-season testing =

Pre-season testing of the 2020 Formula One season

- Genre: Full day test with morning (8–12pm) and afternoon (1–5pm) sessions
- Dates: 19–21, 26–28 February 2020
- Venue: Circuit de Barcelona-Catalunya
- Locations: Montmeló, Catalonia, Spain

2020 Formula One pre-season testing was a series of test sessions sanctioned by the governing body of Formula One, the Fédération Internationale de l'Automobile (FIA) to allow teams to prepare for the 2020 Formula One World Championship. It took place at the Circuit de Barcelona-Catalunya and consisted of two sets of three testing days (19–21 February and 26–28 February). All ten Formula One teams entered for the season took part in the test, and all five tyre compounds were available to teams during the test.

== Teams and drivers ==
Similarly to the previous year, Mercedes covered the most mileage overall, despite some power unit reliability issues (which was shared by customer team Williams). Williams avoided its problems of 2019 (when it missed two and a half days of running) and participated in the entire test. Haas and Alfa Romeo launched their cars at the first test, while all other teams launched prior to the test between 11 and 17 February. The testing period was somewhat affected by the COVID-19 pandemic. McLaren, for example, banned individuals who had traveled from China in the last 14 days from their motorhome.

The teams alternated between their two drivers, typically on a daily or semi-daily basis. Robert Kubica was the only test driver to take part in the test, driving for Alfa Romeo on both Wednesdays. Sebastian Vettel was scheduled to be the first to drive for Scuderia Ferrari, but missed day one of testing with flu-like symptoms, and his place was taken by Charles Leclerc.

== The test ==
The Circuit de Barcelona-Catalunya has been used as the venue for pre-season testing for many years, and is favoured by teams because its mix of low and high speed corners. Temperatures at the circuit are cooler in February, so performance at the test differs from performance at the Grand Prix later in the year.

Teams perform both longer race simulation runs and short qualifying simulations, where the fastest times are set. Testing provides the teams with the opportunity to experiment with different versions of the same part, with many employing aero rakes and flow-viz paint to understand the aerodynamic performance of the car.

First test

Day 1 of the test marked the first appearance of the AlphaTauri team, rebranded from Toro Rosso. Esteban Ocon returned to Formula One, now with Renault, after a one-year hiatus. Daniel Ricciardo wore a purple helmet in memory of the recently deceased Kobe Bryant. Hamilton set the fastest time of 1:16.976. On the second day, Mercedes' new dual-axis steering innovation was a major talking point, when in-car footage showed the drivers pulling the steering wheel backwards to activate the device. Sebastian Vettel recovered from his illness to take testing duties in the afternoon session. Kimi Räikkönen set the fastest time of 1:17.091 then caused the first and only red flag of the day when his Alfa Romeo stopped on track coming up to turn 9. Day 3 saw four red flag stoppages to the session: Vettel had a power unit failure at turn 12, Nicholas Latifi's Williams broke down at the end of the main straight, Kevin Magnussen spun and hit the barrier at turn 8, and Ricciardo's Renault also stopped on track. Bottas set the fastest time of either test on day 3, 1:15.732.

Second test

On day 1 of the second test, numerous drivers, including Hamilton, Vettel, Leclerc, George Russell, Sergio Perez and Max Verstappen trialed the C2 prototype tyre designed to address the banked turns at the updated Zandvoort circuit. Pierre Gasly missed most of the morning with a power unit issue, while Alex Albon lost time to suspension issue. Both Ferrari and Williams tested new front wings. There were three red flags, one when Vettel spun, another for Latifi's breakdown, and a third towards the end of the session when both Verstappen and Daniil Kvyat stopped on track. Robert Kubica set the fastest lap of the day: 1:16.942, demonstrating Alfa Romeo's improvement in pace. Day 2 had a wet start, with many teams choosing to go out initially on intermediate tyres. Hamilton broke down with an oil pressure anomaly that ended his running for the day, having completed just 14 laps. The other three red flags were caused by drivers spinning and getting stuck in the gravel: Antonio Giovinazzi (turn 4), Verstappen (turn 5) and Vettel (turn 5). Vettel set the fastest time of the day of 1:16.841. The final day of testing was relatively incident free, with no red flags, and many of the drivers focusing on longer runs, such as Hamilton, Leclerc, Carlos Sainz, and Romain Grosjean. Leclerc completed the most laps of any driver on a single day with 181. Bottas set the fastest lap of the day with a 1:16.196, another lap faster than anyone else managed throughout the entire testing schedule.

== Fastest times and overall mileage ==
Most fastest times were set on the softest C5 tyres. Pirelli estimated in the previous year that the performance gap between each tyre compound was around 0.6-0.7 s, although this varied based on numerous factors. Bottas' fastest time was three tenths slower than his pole position time from the 2019 Spanish Grand Prix at the same circuit. As of February 2020, his Q2 and Q3 laps from the 2019 Grand Prix and his fastest lap in 2020 testing are the three fastest laps ever at the circuit in its current configuration, and the only three laps under 1:16.000 s.

Fastest times and distance by driver
Driver	Constructor	Time	Tyre compound	Laps	Distance
Valtteri Bottas	Mercedes	1:15.732	C5	437	2,034 km (1,264 mi)
Max Verstappen	Red Bull Racing-Honda	1:16.269	C4	414	1,926 km (1,197 mi)
Daniel Ricciardo	Renault	1:16.276	C5	367	1,708 km (1,061 mi)
Charles Leclerc	Ferrari	1:16.360	C5	442	2,058 km (1,279 mi)
Lewis Hamilton	Mercedes	1:16.410	C5	466	2,169 km (1,348 mi)
Esteban Ocon	Renault	1:16.433	C5	376	1,749 km (1,087 mi)
Sergio Pérez	Racing Point-BWT Mercedes	1:16.634	C5	441	2,054 km (1,276 mi)
Carlos Sainz Jr.	McLaren-Renault	1:16.820	C5	446	2,076 km (1,290 mi)
Sebastian Vettel	Ferrari	1:16.841	C5	402	1,872 km (1,163 mi)
George Russell	Williams-Mercedes	1:16.871	C5	394	1,835 km (1,140 mi)
Daniil Kvyat	AlphaTauri-Honda	1:16.914	C4	399	1,857 km (1,154 mi)
Robert Kubica	Alfa Romeo Racing-Ferrari	1:16.942	C5	112	521 km (324 mi)
Romain Grosjean	Haas-Ferrari	1:17.037	C4	399	1,857 km (1,154 mi)
Pierre Gasly	AlphaTauri-Honda	1:17.066	C5	370	1,722 km (1,070 mi)
Kimi Räikkönen	Alfa Romeo Racing-Ferrari	1:17.091	C5	300	1,397 km (868 mi)
Lance Stroll	Racing Point-BWT Mercedes	1:17.118	C3	341	1,587 km (986 mi)
Nicholas Latifi	Williams-Mercedes	1:17.313	C5	343	1,596 km (992 mi)
Kevin Magnussen	Haas-Ferrari	1:17.495	C5	250	1,164 km (723 mi)
Alexander Albon	Red Bull Racing-Honda	1:17.550	C4	366	1,704 km (1,059 mi)
Lando Norris	McLaren-Renault	1:17.573	C2	356	1,658 km (1,030 mi)
Antonio Giovinazzi	Alfa Romeo Racing-Ferrari	1:19.670	C3	323	1,505 km (935 mi)

Distance by constructor
Constructor	Laps	Distance
Mercedes	903	4,204 km (2,612 mi)
Ferrari	844	3,928 km (2,441 mi)
McLaren-Renault	802	3,734 km (2,320 mi)
Racing Point-BWT Mercedes	782	3,640 km (2,262 mi)
Red Bull Racing-Honda	780	3,631 km (2,256 mi)
AlphaTauri-Honda	769	3,581 km (2,225 mi)
Renault	743	3,458 km (2,149 mi)
Williams-Mercedes	737	3,431 km (2,132 mi)
Alfa Romeo Racing-Ferrari	735	3,421 km (2,126 mi)
Haas-Ferrari	649	3,021 km (1,877 mi)
