= Alex Albon =

Thai and British racing driver (born 1996)

- อเล็กซ์ อัลบอน
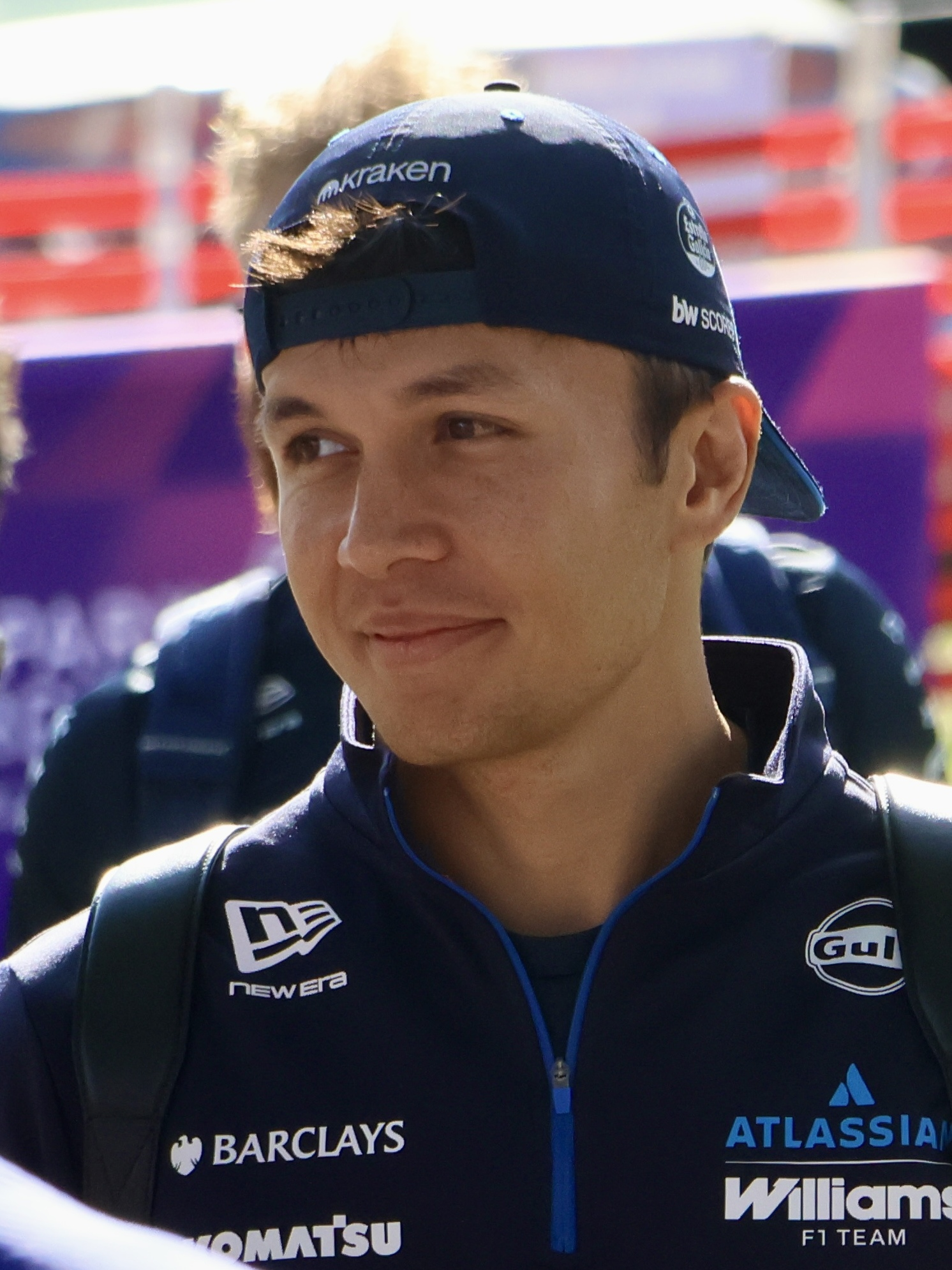
- Albon during the 2026 Australian Grand Prix
- Born: Alexander Philippe Albon Ansusinha; 23 March 1996 (age 30); London, England
- Partners: Muni "Lily" He (2019–present; engaged)
- Parent: Nigel Albon (father)
- Relatives: Mark Albon (uncle)

Formula One World Championship career
- Nationality: (Thailand) Thai
- 2026 team: Atlassian Williams-Mercedes
- Car number: 23
- Entries: 151 (147 starts)
- Championships: 0
- Wins: 0
- Podiums: 2
- Career points: 318
- Pole positions: 0
- Fastest laps: 1
- First entry: 2019 Australian Grand Prix
- Last entry: 2026 Las Vegas Grand Prix
- 2025 position: 8th (73 pts)

Previous series
- 2021; 2017–2018; 2016; 2015; 2013–2014; 2012–2014; 2012: DTM; FIA Formula 2; GP3 Series; FIA F3 European; Formula Renault NEC; Formula Renault Eurocup; Formula Renault 2.0 Alps

Awards
- 2019; 2019: FIA Rookie of the Year; Autosport Rookie of the Year
- Website: www.alexalbon.com

Alexander Philippe Albon Ansusinha (Thai: อเล็กซานเดอร์ อัลบอน อังศุสิงห์; (Note: Ansusinha (RTGS: Angsusing) is his maternal Thai surname, pronounced [ʔāŋ.sùʔ.sǐŋ].) born 23 March 1996) is a Thai and British racing driver who competes under the Thai flag in Formula One for Williams.

Born in Westminster and raised in Suffolk, Albon is the son of English racing driver Nigel Albon and Thai mother Kankamol "Minky" Albon. After a successful karting career—culminating in his victories at the junior World Cup and European Championship in 2010—Albon graduated to junior formulae. Following three seasons in the Formula Renault Eurocup from 2012 to 2014, Albon progressed to the FIA Formula 3 European Championship in 2015. He moved to the GP3 Series for 2016, finishing runner-up to Charles Leclerc in his rookie season with ART. Graduating to FIA Formula 2 in 2017, Albon finished third in the championship the following season with DAMS.

Previously a member of the Red Bull Junior Team from 2008 to 2012, Albon signed for Toro Rosso in 2019, making his Formula One debut at the Australian Grand Prix; after 12 races, he was promoted to parent team Red Bull, replacing Pierre Gasly to partner Max Verstappen. In 2020, he became the first Thai driver to achieve a podium in Formula One at the Tuscan Grand Prix, which he repeated in Bahrain. Replaced by Sergio Pérez in 2021, Albon continued as a reserve driver for Red Bull and the re-branded AlphaTauri, contesting DTM with Red Bull AF Corse alongside Liam Lawson. Albon signed for Williams in 2022 to replace George Russell, ending his association with Red Bull at the conclusion of his first season. He remained at Williams through the 2023, 2024, and 2025 seasons, finishing eighth—the highest of the midfield drivers—in the latter.

As of the 2026 Las Vegas Grand Prix, Albon has achieved two podium finishes and one fastest lap in Formula One. He is contracted to remain at Williams until at least the end of the 2027 season.

== Early life ==
Alexander Philippe Albon Ansusinha was born at the Portland Hospital in the City of Westminster, London, England, on 23 March 1996. His father, Nigel Albon is a British former racing driver who participated in the British Touring Car Championship and Porsche Carrera Cup. His mother, Kankamol "Minky" Albon (née Ansusinha), originates from Thailand. His uncle, Mark Albon, is a former racing driver who competed in one round of International Formula 3000.

Growing up in Bures, Suffolk alongside a younger brother, Luca, and three sisters, Chloe, Zoe and Alicia, Albon attended Ipswich School before leaving to pursue his professional racing career, citing Michael Schumacher and Valentino Rossi as being inspirational figures when he was younger.

== Junior racing career ==
=== Karting (2005–2011) ===
Albon started competitively racing karts in 2005 at the age of eight, competing locally and winning his local Hoddesdon Championship at Rye House Kart Circuit. In 2006, Albon started racing in the cadet class, finishing first at the Kartmasters British Grand Prix and participating in the Super 1 National Honda Cadet Championship finishing first in 2006 and second in 2007. In 2008, he was signed to the Red Bull Junior Team and moved up to the KF3 class, where he stayed until 2010. During this time, Albon won the Kartmasters British Grand Prix, Formula Kart Stars Championship, KF Winter Series, Super 1 National KF3 Championship, CIK-FIA World Cup, and CIK-FIA European Championship. In 2011, Albon graduated to KF1 placing second in the WSK Euro Series and second at the CIK-FIA World Championship.

=== Formula Renault 2.0 (2012–2014) ===
==== 2012: Junior formulae debut ====
From karting, Albon graduated to the Formula Renault 2.0 Eurocup series where he drove for EPIC Racing in 2012 alongside Kevin Giovesi, Konstantin Tereschenko, Kevin Jörg, Dennis Wusthoff and Christof von Grunigen and finished 38th out of 49 in the championship after having a tough year and being unable to score points. Albon was dropped by Red Bull at the end of 2012.

==== 2013: Maiden pole position ====
In 2013, Albon was signed to Lotus F1 Academy and joined KTR to race in the Eurocup Formula Renault 2.0 season alongside Yu Kanamaru and Ignazio D'Agosto, finishing 16th out of 36 in the championship. Albon managed to secure one fastest lap and one pole position in the 2013 season, both of them coming at the Red Bull Ring in Austria. He finished the 2013 season with 22 points.

==== 2014: Third in the Eurocup ====
In 2014, Albon raced alongside Gregor Ramsay, Jules Gounon and Callan O'Keefe and enjoyed a much more successful year. He was once again unable to find a win at any of the 14 races but managed to get one pole position at the Nürburgring and finished third in the drivers' championship with 117 points.

=== Formula Three (2015) ===
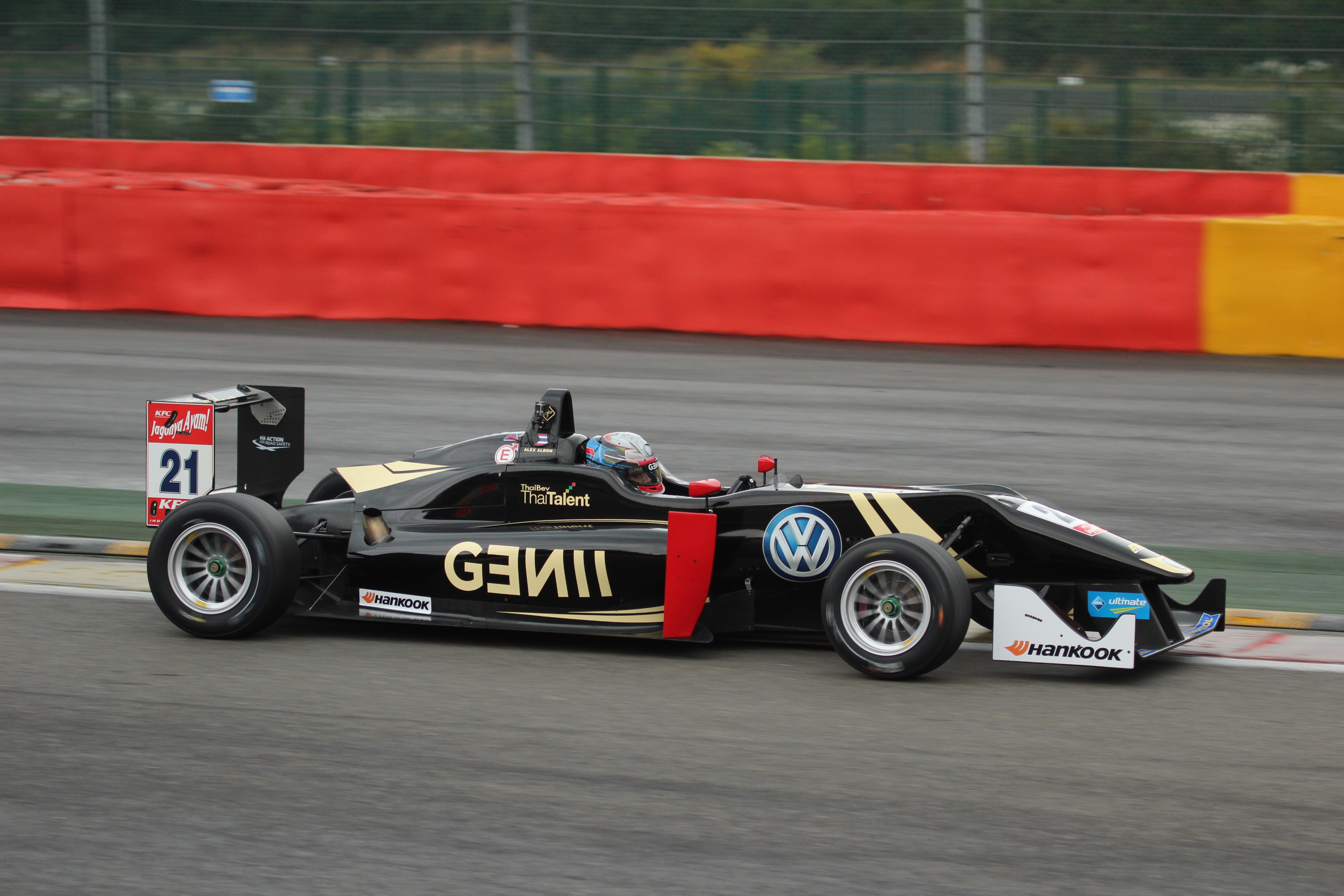
Albon at Spa in 2015, European Formula 3 Championship

In 2015, Albon switched to FIA European Formula 3, racing at Signature with teammate Dorian Boccolacci. He finished seventh overall, with two pole positions (scored at the Norisring), 5 podiums (including four rookie wins), and 187 points overall.

=== GP3 Series (2016) ===
In December 2015, Albon partook in post-season testing with ART Grand Prix. In 2016, Albon raced for ART in the GP3. Albon claimed four wins and finished as runner-up in the championship to teammate Charles Leclerc.

=== FIA Formula 2 (2017–2018) ===
==== 2017: Rookie season and maiden podiums ====
In 2017, Albon graduated to the FIA Formula 2 Championship, with ART. His teammate for the season would be Nobuharu Matsushita, who at the time was also signed as a development driver for McLaren. He made his debut in Bahrain, where he started in ninth place on the starting grid for the feature race and finished sixth. For the sprint race, Albon qualified third on the grid, behind Luca Ghiotto and his teammate, Matsushita. However, mechanical problems forced Matsushita to start from the pitlane promoting Albon to second. Albon struggled for grip for the majority of the race and finished in seventh position.

At the Spanish round, Albon placed fifth on the provisional starting grid for the feature race. He made a strong start, moving to third behind Charles Leclerc and Ghiotto. Leclerc began to pull away from Ghiotto, who began to fall into the clutches of Albon, who subsequently made a move into turn one and took second place from Ghiotto. Leclerc pitted on lap seven, leaving Albon with the lead of the race. After a three-lap safety car period beginning on lap 10, Oliver Rowland eventually pressured Albon into a mistake to take the lead of the race, although both still had an impending pitstop to make. With the fresh rubber, Albon and Rowland were staging a comeback with both drivers challenging for the podium toward the latter stages of the race. Albon finished the race in fifth position. In the sprint race, Albon started fourth on the grid and enjoyed a well-fought battle with Leclerc for the majority of the race and after battling for several laps, Leclerc finally passed Albon for fifth place. Later in the race however, Albon dropped back, finishing the race in eighth position.

At the Monaco round, Albon qualified second on the grid with a time of 1:19.321 seconds. In qualifying, the grid was separated into two Groups due to safety concerns over the short and tight nature of the circuit. Albon was part of the 'Group B' qualifying and managed to gain the fastest time in that group, only qualifying 12 hundredths of a second behind Leclerc who qualified in Group A. After an aborted start due to Antonio Fuoco and Sean Gelael's engines stalling on the grid, Leclerc led into the first corner, followed by Albon. A concertina effect occurred at the Grand Hotel Hairpin as Canamasas was spun, causing Gelael to lose his front wing and bringing out a local yellow. Later in the race, Albon found himself stuck behind the slower moving Norman Nato and Jordan King, which eventually caused him to lose places, finishing the race in a disappointing fourth position. In the Sprint Race, Albon started fifth on the grid, and after a very tight race, he dropped back to finish in sixth position. Albon missed the Baku round of the Championship due to injury. Albon had sustained a broken collarbone whilst out on a mountain biking training ride, and was unable to compete due to the over-the-shoulder seat belts used in Formula 2.

Albon was back in action for the fifth round of the championship, stating that his initial feeling on returning to action after breaking his collarbone was "a lot better" than he expected. He confirmed that the bone was still "clearly broken" following an x-ray on the Tuesday before the race weekend, and explained that the main issue he is having in the car is a "numb feeling" from the scar he received during successful surgery after the crash. Albon finished the practice session in eighth, which showed that despite the injury, the chance for his first podium in Formula 2 was a possibility. Albon qualified in fourth for the Feature Race, however, he was later promoted to third on the provisional starting grid after Sérgio Sette Câmara was disqualified after the qualifying session after failing to provide the required 1 litre fuel sample. Albon finished the Feature Race in fifth position, after losing places to Oliver Rowland and Nicholas Latifi (both racing for DAMS) whose car proved to have a lot of pace. For the Sprint Race, Albon started the race fourth on the grid and managed to move up the grid to clinch his first podium in Formula 2, finishing behind Artem Markelov. He would later score another podium at the sprint race at the season finale in Abu Dhabi, finishing in second after being overtaken by Leclerc on the final lap. He finished tenth in the drivers' championship in his first F2 season, scoring 86 points.

==== 2018: Third to Russell and Norris ====
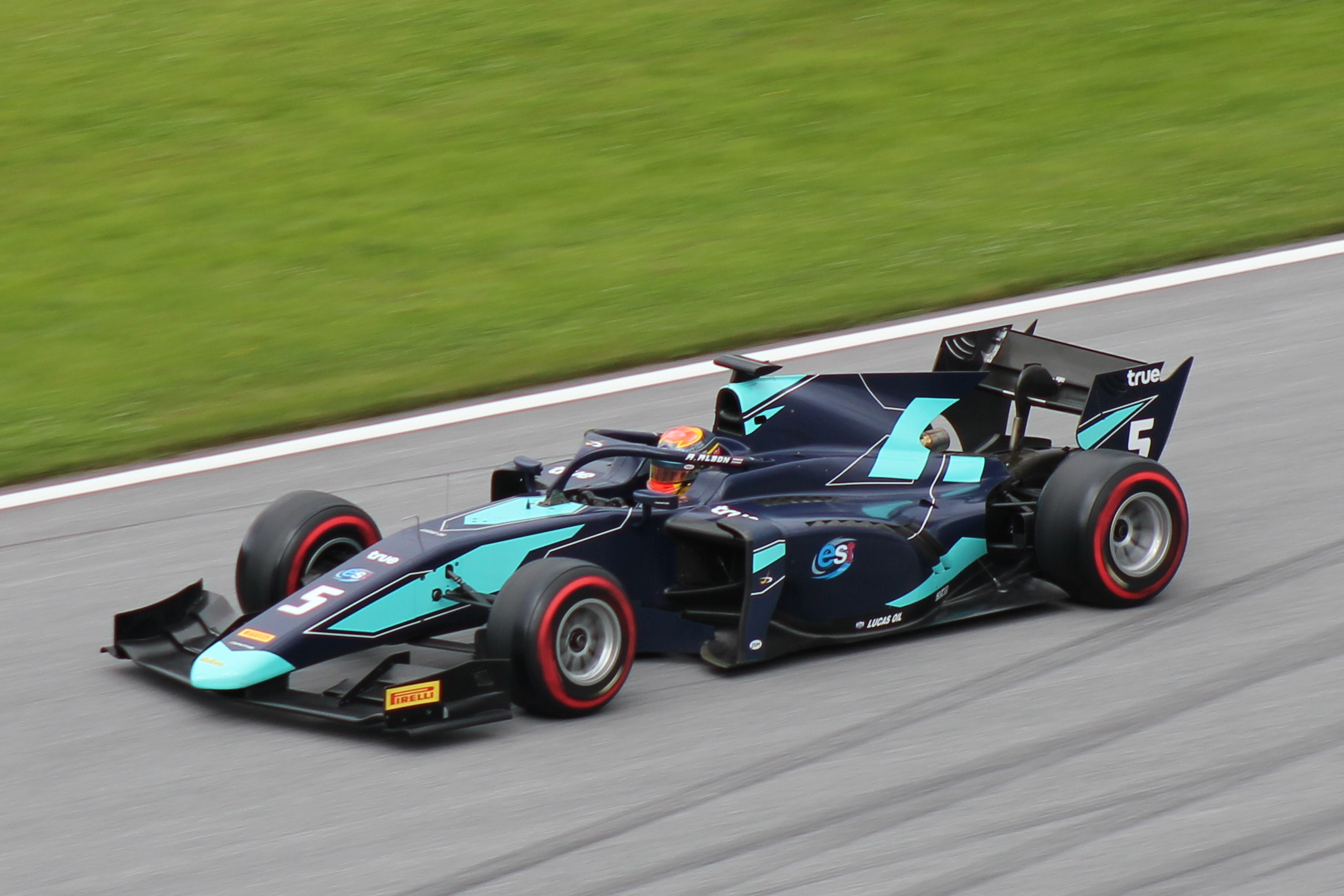
Albon at Red Bull Ring in 2018

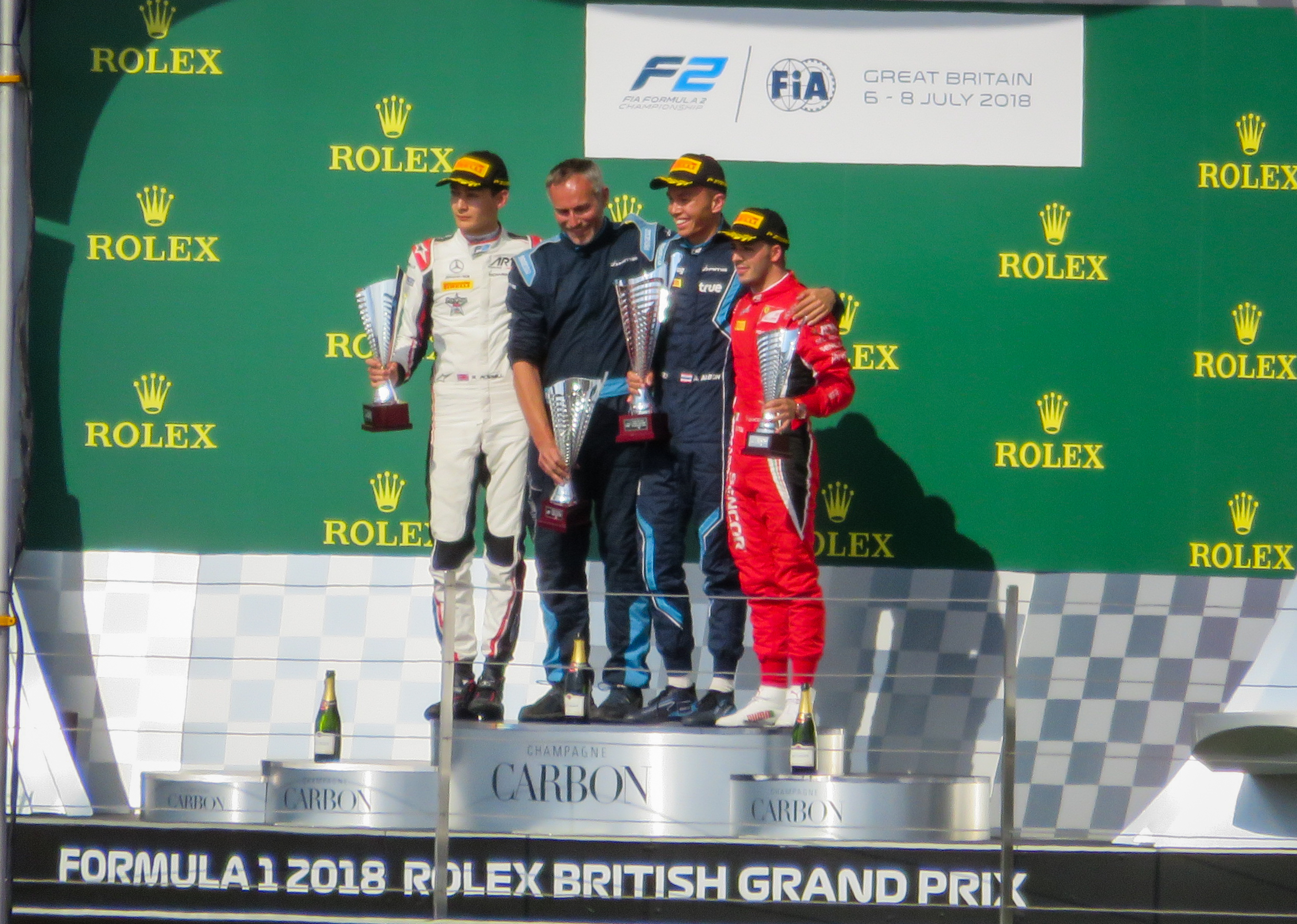
Albon on the podium after winning the 2018 Silverstone Formula 2 round

In April 2018, DAMS announced that they signed Albon for the 2018 season to partner Nicholas Latifi. While initially only confirmed for the opening round, he was later confirmed as a full-time driver for the team the following month. He started the season with fourth place in the feature race in Bahrain before finishing thirteenth in the sprint race.

For the next round in Baku, Albon started from pole for the feature race and followed it up with his first win in F2, while in the sprint race he finished thirteenth again.

At the next two rounds in Barcelona and Monaco, Albon took two more pole positions but finished fifth in the feature race in Spain after getting away slowly while in the sprint he finished second behind Jack Aitken. In Monaco, however, it was a weekend to forget for the Thai driver, as in the feature race, he collided with Nyck de Vries as he was entering the pitlane, spinning him around in the pitlane entrance, while in the sprint race he collided with Campos' Roy Nissany approaching the Nouvelle Chicane.

Another retirement would follow in the feature race at Le Castellet after Albon suffered an engine failure. In the sprint race, he finished seventh, one place ahead of Latifi. After finishing fifth in both races at the Red Bull Ring, Albon won the feature race at Silverstone, before collecting two more wins at the sprint race at the Hungaroring, and the feature race at Sochi. A stall on the grid in the feature race at Abu Dhabi ended his title chances; he finished fourteenth in the feature race and eighth in the sprint race, leaving him third in the drivers' championship behind fellow future F1 drivers George Russell and Lando Norris.

== Formula One career ==
=== Toro Rosso (2019) ===
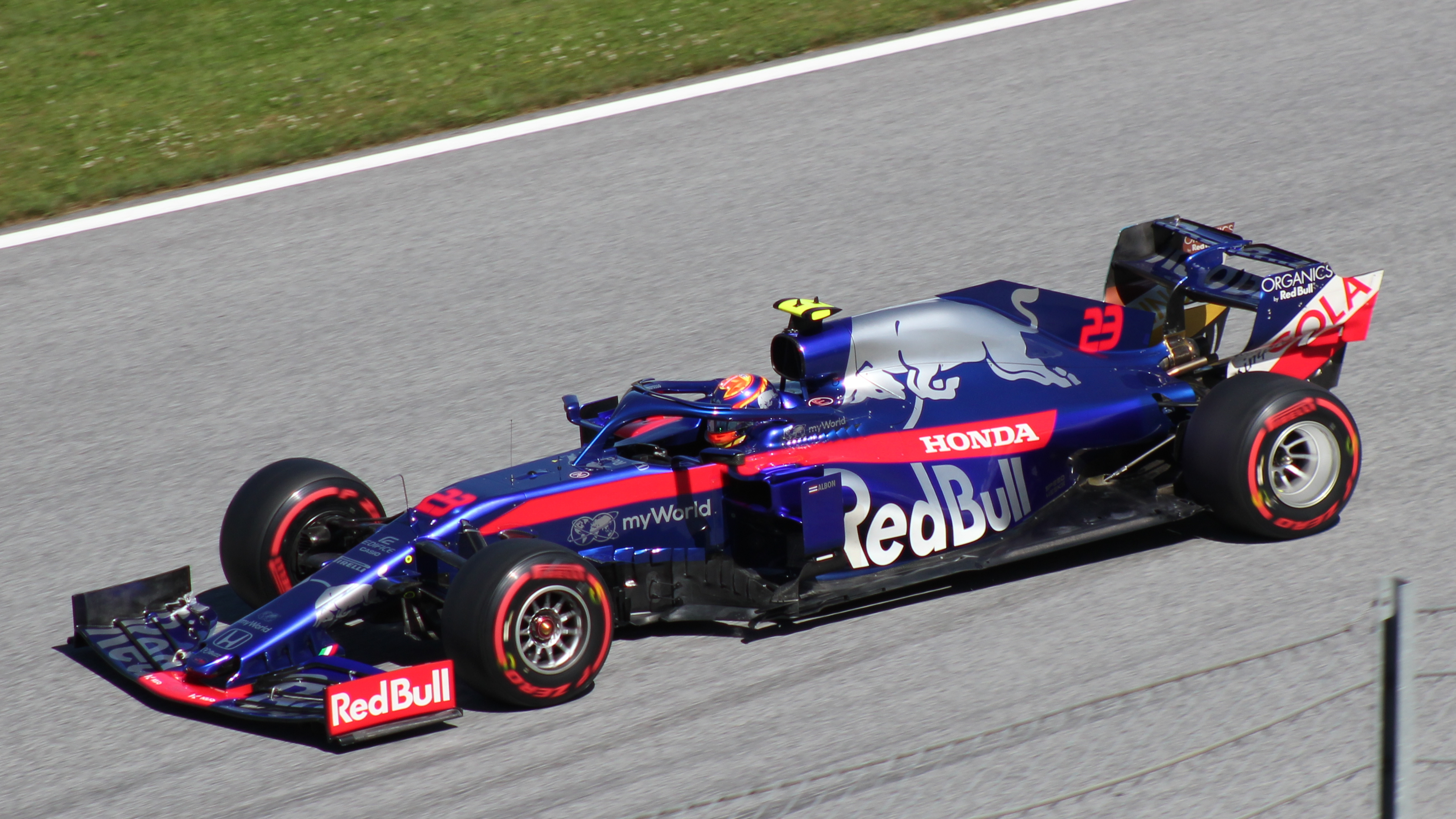
Albon driving for Toro Rosso at the 2019 Austrian Grand Prix

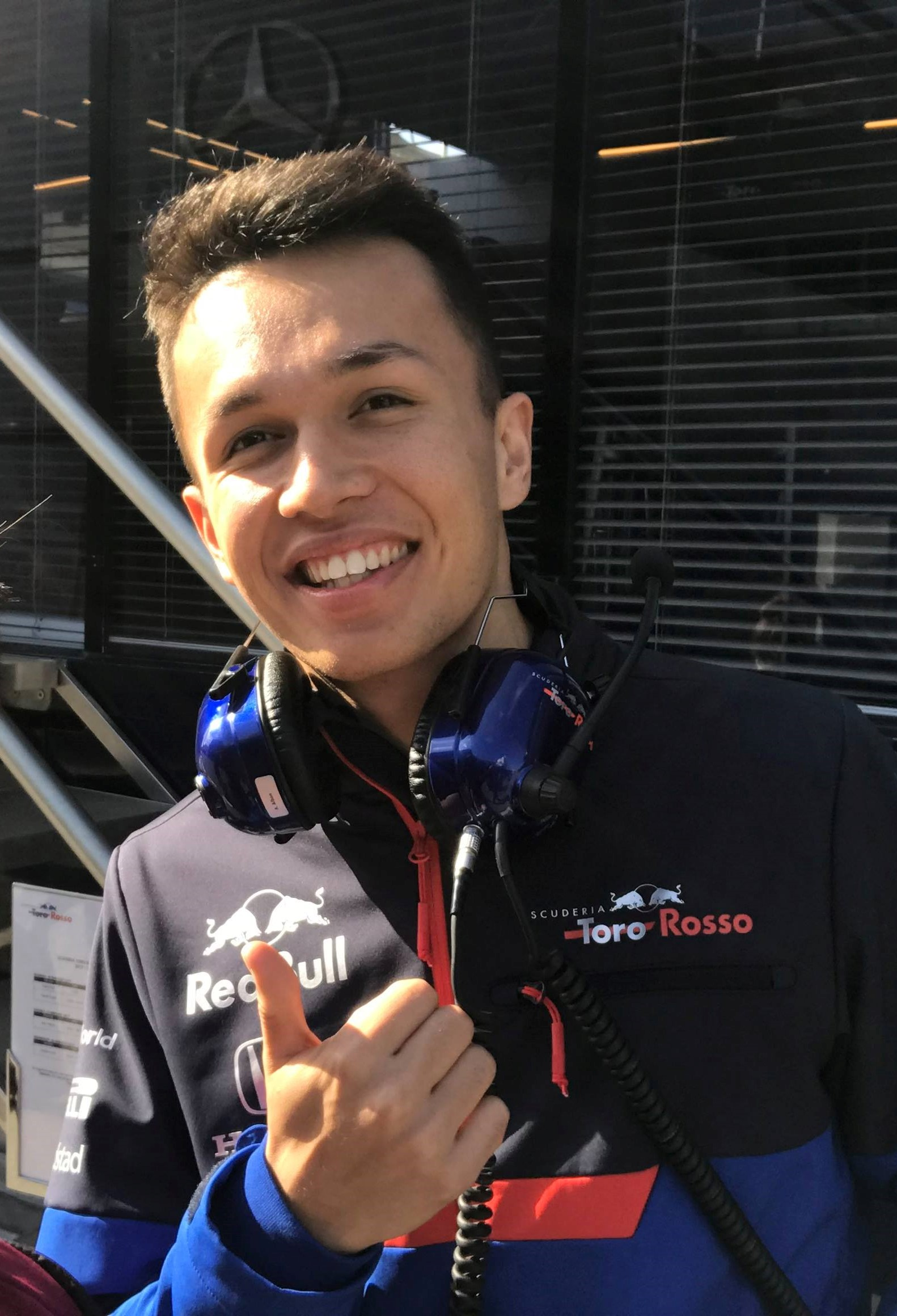
Albon during 2019 F1 pre-season testing

On 26 November 2018, Nissan e.dams terminated their Formula E contract with Albon after rumours he was to sign for Scuderia Toro Rosso in Formula One. On the same day, Toro Rosso announced Albon would join the team for 2019 alongside Daniil Kvyat and thus Albon's relationship with Red Bull Racing, which had ended seven years prior, was restored. He is the second Thai driver to compete in Formula One and the first since Prince Birabongse Bhanudej competed in 1954.

Albon qualified thirteenth and finished fourteenth in his debut race, the Australian Grand Prix. He scored his first points at the following race, the Bahrain Grand Prix, finishing ninth. A heavy crash in practice for the Chinese Grand Prix forced him to miss qualifying and start the race from the pit lane. He recovered in the race to finish tenth and win the Driver Of The Day award. He reached the third qualifying session (Q3) for the first time at the Monaco Grand Prix and finished the race eighth. Damage caused by contact with Antonio Giovinazzi on the first lap of the Canadian Grand Prix later led to Albon's first race retirement.

Albon's best qualifying result with Toro Rosso came at the British Grand Prix with ninth place, although he failed to score points in the race. Albon started the German Grand Prix in sixteenth place. He and Toro Rosso took advantage of changing weather conditions to run as high as fourth and eventually finish sixth, albeit behind teammate Kvyat who claimed the team's first podium finish in over ten years. At this stage of the season, Albon had scored 16 points to Kvyat's 27.

=== Red Bull (2019–2020) ===
==== 2019: Mid-season promotion ====
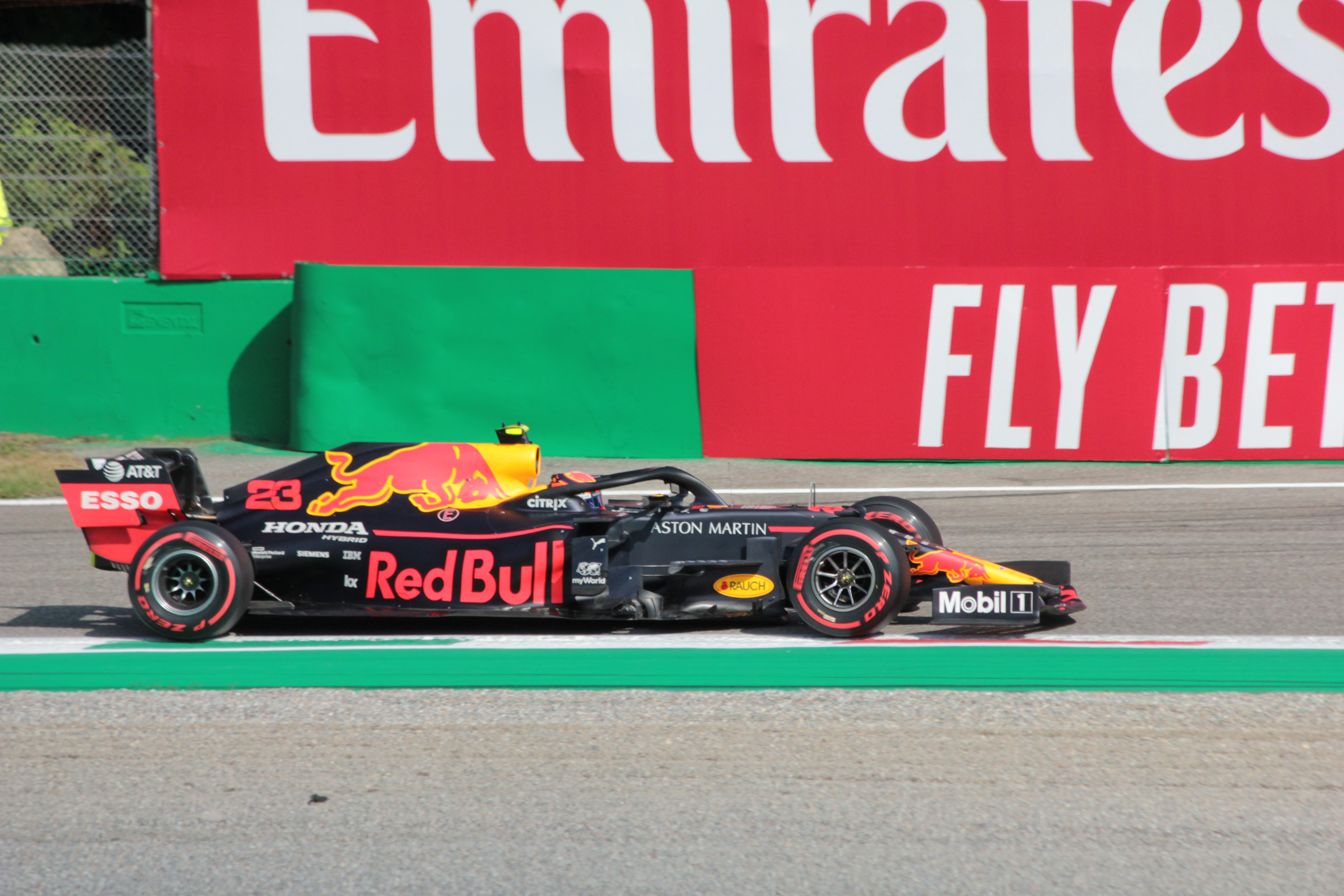
Albon driving for Red Bull at the 2019 Italian Grand Prix

After the Hungarian Grand Prix, Red Bull Racing announced that Albon would be replacing Pierre Gasly and partnering Max Verstappen at the team from the Belgian Grand Prix onwards, with Gasly returning to Toro Rosso. On the mid-season change, Red Bull stated: "The team will use the next nine races to evaluate Alex's performance in order to make an informed decision as to who will drive alongside Max in 2020."

At the Belgian Grand Prix, Albon was forced to start from seventeenth place due to a power unit change. He recovered to finish fifth in the race after passing Sergio Pérez on the final lap. After sixth-place finishes at the Italian and Singapore Grands Prix, Albon finished fifth at the Russian Grand Prix having crashed in qualifying and started from the pit lane. Albon and Verstappen set identical lap times in qualifying at the Japanese Grand Prix and Albon finished a career-best fourth in the race. He finished fifth at both the Mexican and United States Grands Prix, despite taking damage on the opening lap and making three pit stops at the latter. He was in second place on the penultimate lap of the Brazilian Grand Prix, but was hit by Lewis Hamilton during an overtaking attempt, dropping Albon to fourteenth place at the finish. He finished sixth at the Abu Dhabi Grand Prix to close out the season.

Albon ended his debut season eighth in the World Drivers' Championship with 92 points. He scored 76 points during his nine races at Red Bull, compared to 97 for Verstappen over the same period. Albon received the Rookie of the Year award at the FIA Prize Giving Ceremony.

==== 2020: Maiden podiums ====
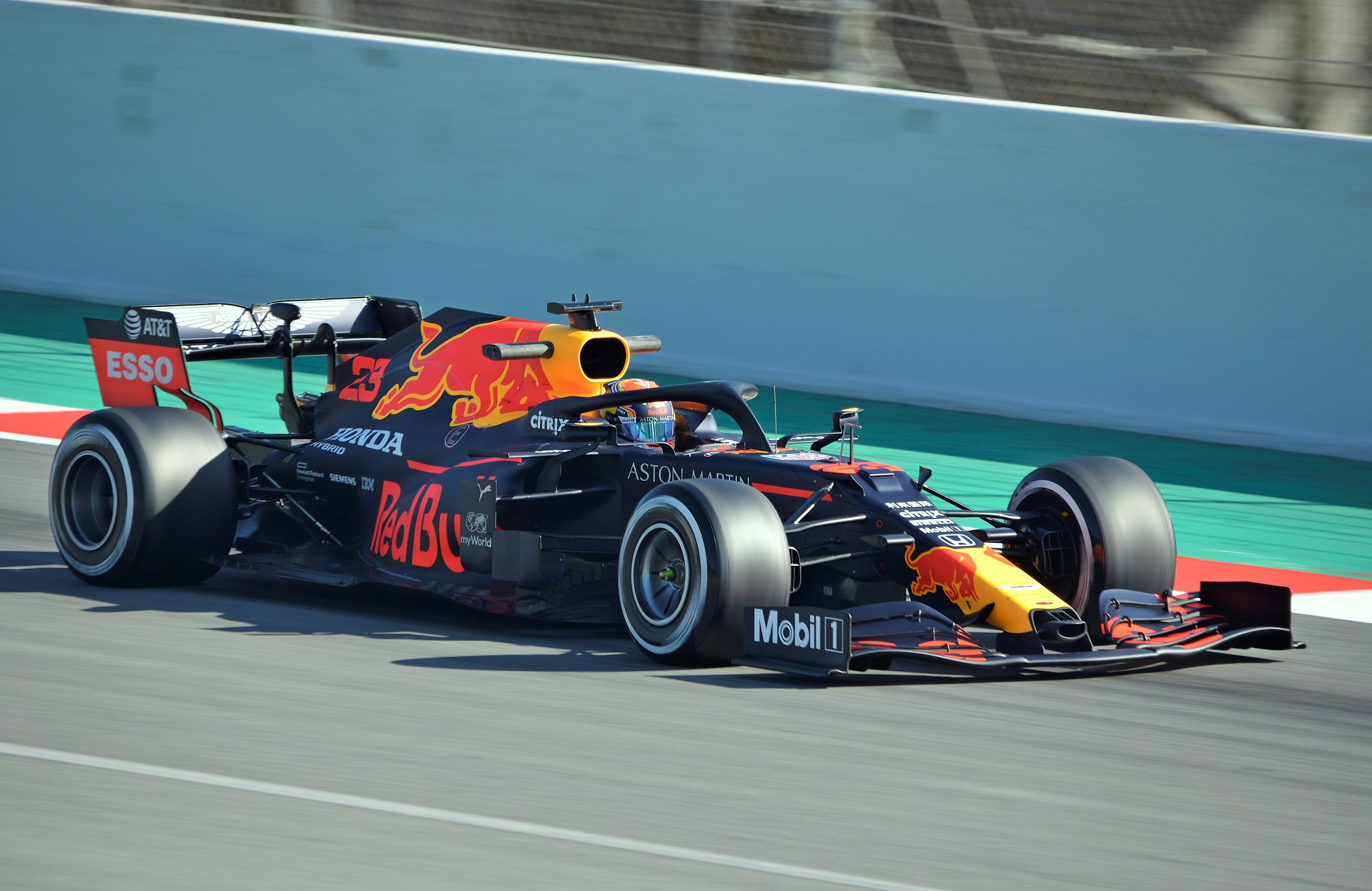
Albon driving for Red Bull in Barcelona in 2020 during pre-season testing

Albon continued racing for Red Bull alongside Verstappen in 2020. In the closing stages of the season-opening Austrian Grand Prix, Albon was in third place at the safety car restart on new soft-compound tyres, behind the leading Mercedes cars on older hard tyres. Albon attempted to overtake Lewis Hamilton but the two made contact, sending Albon into the gravel. Albon later retired with an electrical failure which engine supplier Honda blamed on the collision. He came under pressure from Racing Point's Sergio Pérez in the final laps of the Styrian Grand Prix but maintained fourth place after the drivers made contact, damaging Pérez's front wing. Red Bull commented that they were unsure why Albon lacked pace in the race. He started thirteenth and recovered to fifth at the Hungarian Grand Prix.

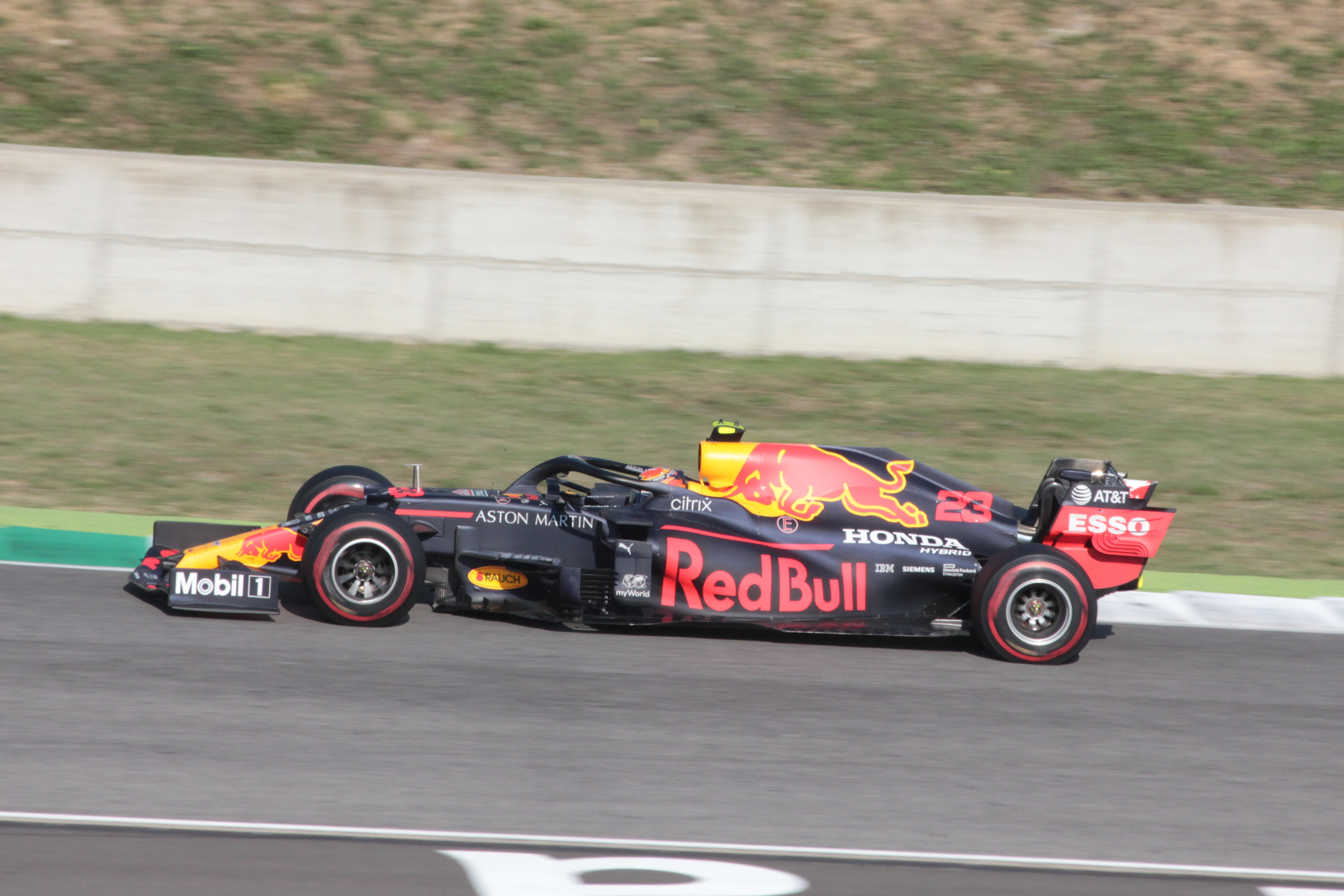
Albon racing at the 2020 Tuscan Grand Prix, where he achieved his maiden podium

Albon crashed heavily in practice for the British Grand Prix and went on to qualify twelfth. He received a penalty in the race for causing a collision with Kevin Magnussen and dropped to the back of the field before ultimately finishing eighth. He qualified fifth for the Belgian Grand Prix but finished sixth after being passed by Renault's Esteban Ocon on the final lap. He was fifteenth at the Italian Grand Prix having taken collision damage and a time penalty on the opening lap. Albon took his maiden Formula One podium at the Tuscan Grand Prix by overtaking Daniel Ricciardo in the closing laps, the first podium for a Thai Formula One driver.

Albon claimed only a single point over the next four races; he finished tenth at the Russian Grand Prix, collided with former teammate Daniil Kvyat and later retired with a damaged radiator at the Eifel Grand Prix, was lapped by Verstappen and finished twelfth at the Portuguese Grand Prix and dropped to fifteenth at the Emilia Romagna Grand Prix due to a spin with five laps remaining. He led a race for the first time at the Turkish Grand Prix on his way to seventh place, and took his second podium finish at the Bahrain Grand Prix after Sergio Pérez retired from third place due to an engine failure, making him the first Asian driver to score more than one podium finish. He finished sixth at the Sakhir Grand Prix, having started twelfth, and finished fourth at the Abu Dhabi Grand Prix, pressuring Lewis Hamilton in the closing stages of the race.

Albon finished the season seventh in the World Drivers' Championship, scoring 105 points to Verstappen's 214.

=== Red Bull / AlphaTauri reserve driver (2021) ===
Albon was demoted to the role of test and reserve driver with Red Bull for 2021, his race seat being taken by Sergio Pérez. Following his demotion, Albon remarked that "it hurts" but added that he hoped to return to a race seat for 2022. After finishing his 2021 DTM campaign, he took on a coaching role for AlphaTauri driver Yuki Tsunoda starting from the 2021 Turkish Grand Prix.

=== Williams (2022–present) ===
==== 2022: Return to new regulations ====
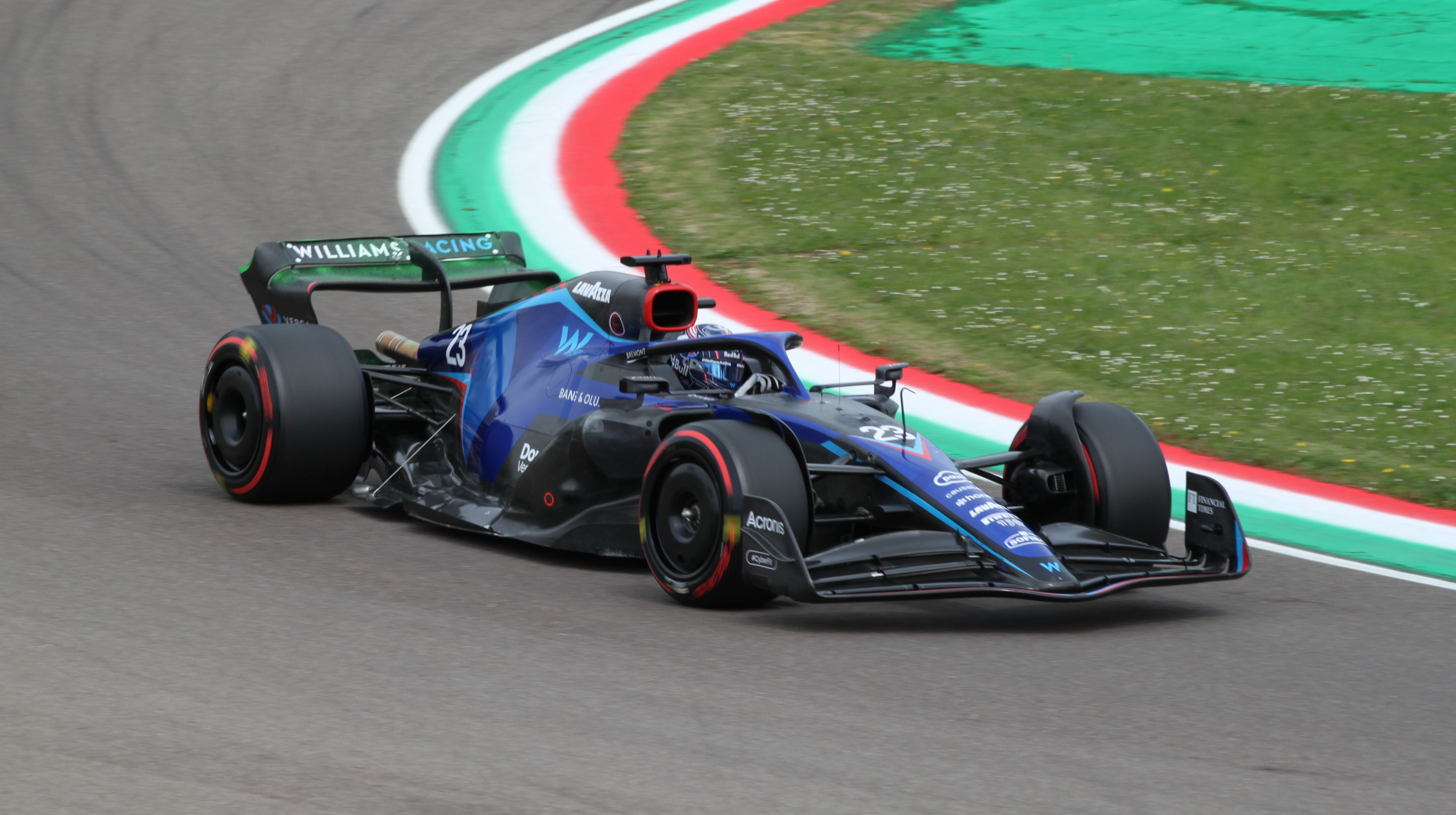
Alex Albon at the 2022 Emilia Romagna Grand Prix

Albon returned to a Formula One race seat in 2022 with Williams, replacing George Russell and partnering former Formula 2 teammate Nicholas Latifi. Red Bull team principal Christian Horner revealed that Albon retained "a link to Red Bull" and that the team had an option to recall him for 2023.

In his first race for Williams, the Bahrain Grand Prix, Albon out-qualified Latifi and finished the race thirteenth. He was in twelfth place in the final laps of the Saudi Arabian Grand Prix, but failed to finish after a collision with Lance Stroll for which Albon was penalised. He scored his first point for Williams at the Australian Grand Prix by finishing tenth; he started the race from last place and made his mandatory pit stop with one lap remaining. He again started last at the Emilia Romagna Grand Prix due to a brake fire in qualifying, but recovered to finish the race eleventh. Albon qualified eighteenth for the inaugural Miami Grand Prix and was classified ninth, his second points score of the season. At the British Grand Prix, Albon was involved in an opening lap crash with Yuki Tsunoda and Esteban Ocon after he was hit from behind by Sebastian Vettel. He was hospitalised for precautionary checks and suffered no serious injuries.

At the Belgian Grand Prix, Albon reached Q3 for the first time with Williams, qualifying ninth and starting sixth due to grid penalties for other drivers. He finished the race tenth, scoring a point. Albon was forced to withdraw from the Italian Grand Prix after suffering from appendicitis and was replaced by Nyck de Vries. Williams later revealed that Albon had suffered anaesthetic-related respiratory failure following his surgery but was recovering well. He recovered in time for the Singapore Grand Prix, three weeks later, where he retired with damage from colliding with the barriers. He then retired on the opening lap of the Japanese Grand Prix after a collision with Kevin Magnussen. An eighth-place start at the United States Grand Prix failed to produce points with a thirteenth-place finish. He qualified eleventh at the São Paulo Grand Prix but a puncture caused his retirement from the sprint, demoting him to the back of the grid for the race. Albon ended the season nineteenth in the World Drivers' Championship, scoring four of Williams' eight points.

==== 2023: End of Red Bull affiliation ====
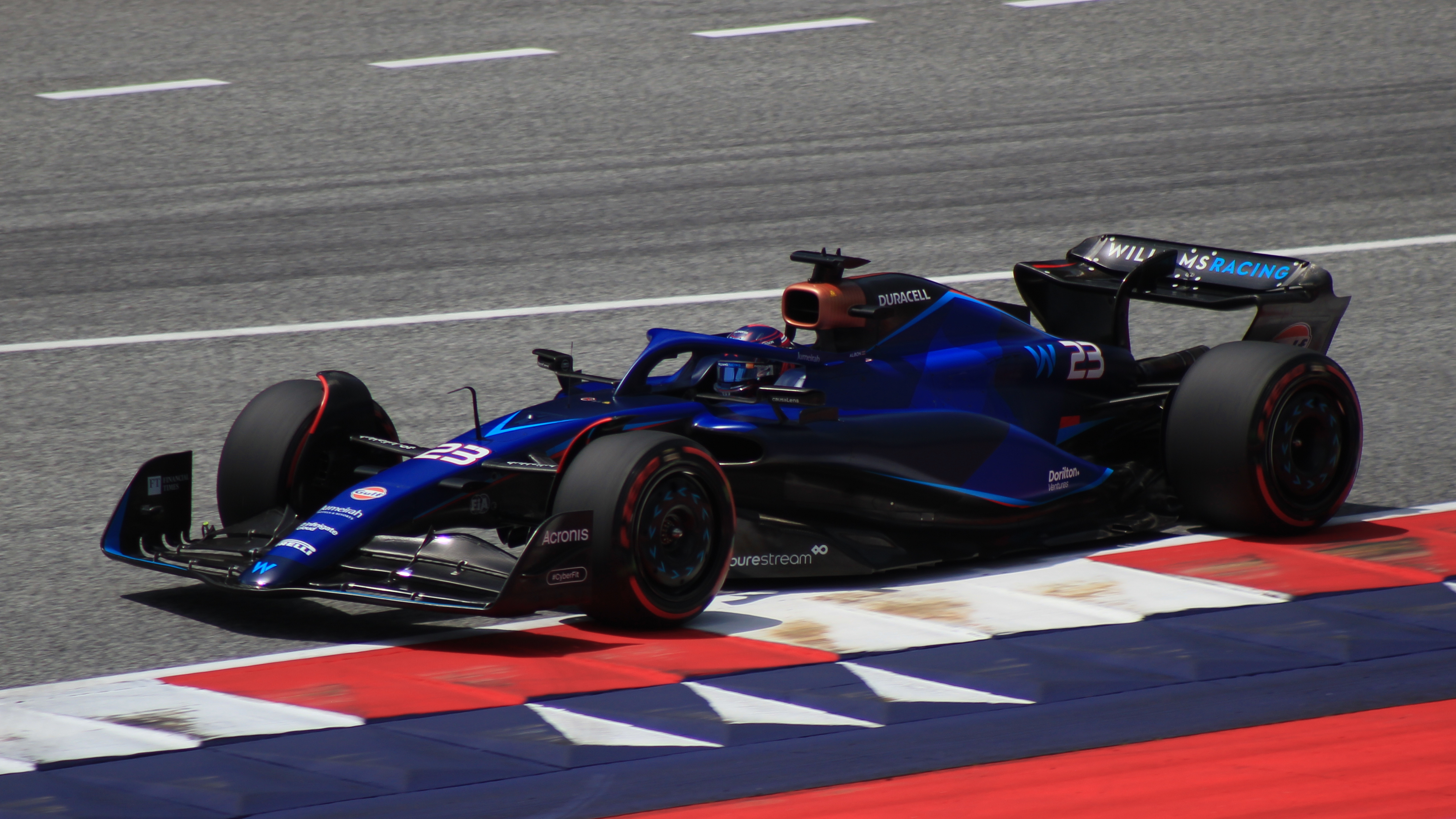
Albon at the 2023 Austrian Grand Prix

Albon was retained by Williams for 2023 on a multi-year contract partnering Logan Sargeant who replaced Nicholas Latifi. Albon's contract extension marked the end of his Red Bull affiliation, although he stated that he still maintained "a very close relationship" with the team; the logo of Monsoon Valley, a wine brand founded by Red Bull co-owner Chalerm Yoovidhya, features on his race helmet. He qualified fifteenth at the season-opening Bahrain Grand Prix, failing to set a time in Q2 due to front wing damage. He recovered in the race to score a point with tenth place. He retired from the Saudi Arabian Grand Prix with a brake failure. He qualified eighth at the Australian Grand Prix and ran as high as sixth in the opening laps, but crashed heavily on lap six. At the Azerbaijan Grand Prix, he qualified and finished the sprint race in the top ten, but failed to score points after finishing the main race twelfth.

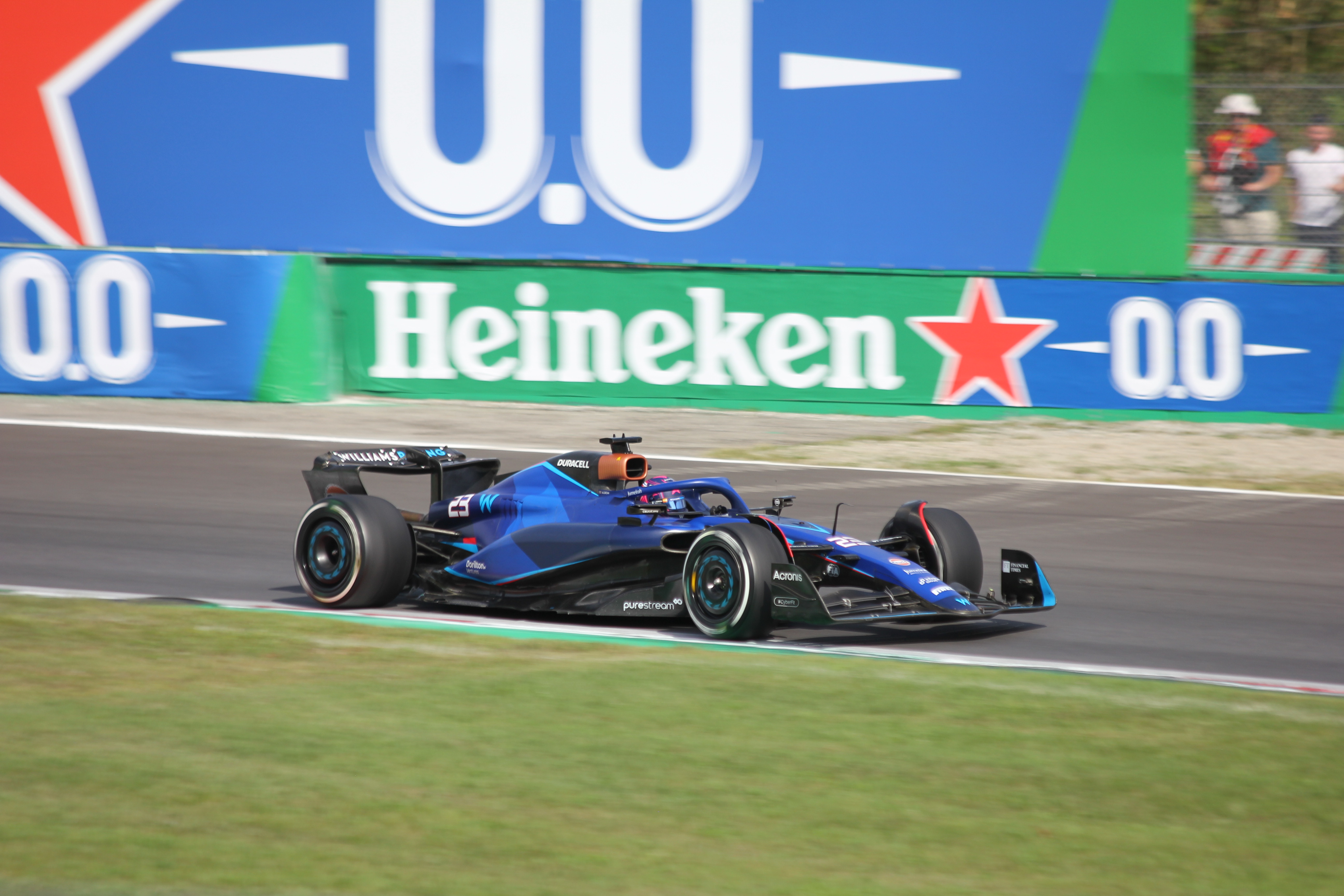
Albon at the 2023 Italian Grand Prix

Albon started ninth at the Canadian Grand Prix, executed a successful one-stop strategy and held behind the faster cars of Sergio Pérez and George Russell for much of the race to finish seventh, his best result thus far for Williams. He received praise from Red Bull team principal Christian Horner for his performance. Another Q3 appearance came at the Austrian Grand Prix followed by an eleventh-place finish. He qualified in the top ten for the third consecutive race at the British Grand Prix and finished ahead of both Ferraris in eighth place. He matched his highest career qualifying position at the Dutch Grand Prix, starting fourth. Despite staying on slick tyres during a rain shower in the early laps and dropping to fifteenth place, he recovered to finish eighth. He scored points again at the Italian Grand Prix where he qualified sixth and defended against Lando Norris to finish seventh.

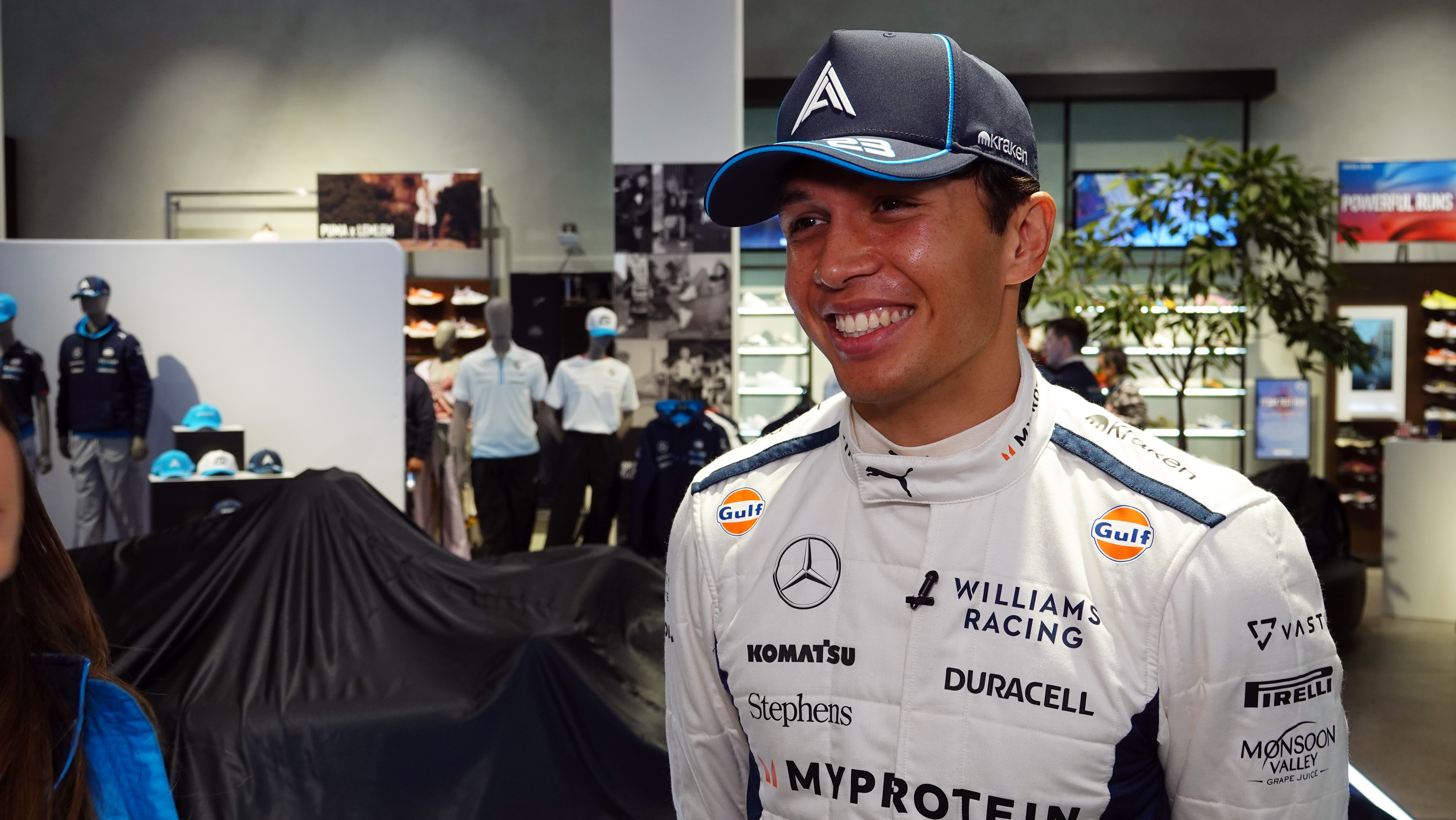
Albon speaking to the media at the launch event for the Williams FW46 at the Puma Flagship Store in New York City

Albon started seventeenth for the Qatar Grand Prix sprint and gained ten places to score points in seventh place. He received two penalties for track limits infringements and failed to score in the main race. More points came at the United States and Mexico City Grands Prix; he finished ninth in both races having started outside the top ten. He was then eliminated in a first-corner collision with Kevin Magnussen at the São Paulo Grand Prix, having started thirteenth. Albon and teammate Sargeant started fifth and sixth respectively for the Las Vegas Grand Prix, but both failed to score in the race (with Albon finishing 12th), due to the timing of safety car going against them. Albon ended the season thirteenth in the Drivers' Championship. He scored 27 points to Sargeant's one point, securing Williams seventh place in the Constructors' Championship.

==== 2024: Setbacks at Williams ====
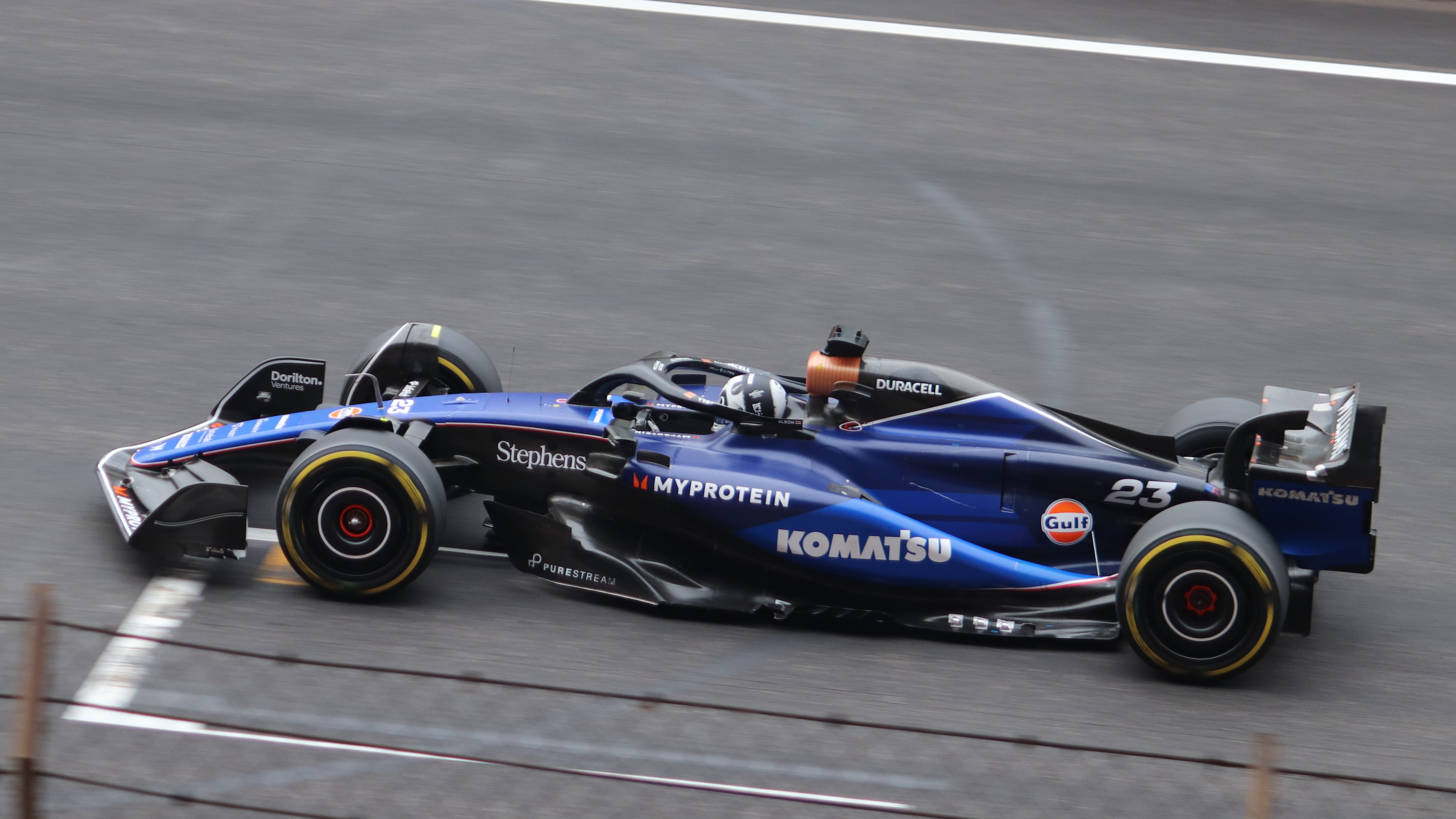
Albon at the 2024 Chinese Grand Prix

Albon continued at Williams alongside Sargeant for 2024. He qualified and finished outside the top ten at the season-opening Bahrain Grand Prix, with the team stating that both drivers were dealing with engine overheating issues during the race. He and Kevin Magnussen collided at the Saudi Arabian Grand Prix and Albon went on to finish eleventh.

Albon crashed in the first practice session at the Australian Grand Prix and Williams were unable to repair his car, nor did they have a spare chassis. Team principal James Vowles described the situation as "a reflection of how behind we were in the winter period". The team decided to withdraw Sargeant from the event and allow Albon to use the one remaining car. He finished the race eleventh. He qualified fourteenth for the Japanese Grand Prix but was eliminated in a first-lap crash with Daniel Ricciardo. On 15 May, Williams confirmed that Albon has signed a multi-year extension to stay with the team.

Albon did not score points in the next three races which included him retiring in Imola due to issues putting the tyre on at his pit stop taking him out of the points battle. Looking to bounce back Albon qualified ninth at the Monaco Grand Prix. He then kept hold of his position to finish in 9th place which marked his and Williams first points of the season. Albon then qualified 10th for the Canadian Grand Prix but retired from the race whilst running in the points on lap 52 after Carlos Sainz spun into him sending him into the wall.

After finishing out of the points in Spain and Austria, Albon then earned his second points finish of the season by finishing ninth at the British Grand Prix This meant at the halfway point of the season Albon was 17th in the drivers' championship with four points. After the Dutch Grand Prix, Franco Colapinto became Albon's new teammate from the Italian Grand Prix onwards. At Monza, Albon scored Williams' third points finish of the season taking another 9th place. During the Azerbaijan Grand Prix, Albon benefitted from a late crash between Sergio Pérez and Carlos Sainz Jr., which saw Albon finish seventh, allowing Williams to overtake Alpine in the World Constructors' Championship.

Albon did not start the São Paulo Grand Prix after crashing heavily in the third qualifying session; qualifying had been rescheduled to Sunday morning, leaving Williams unable to repair his chassis in time for the race two hours later. A cooling issue forced Albon to retire midway through the Las Vegas Grand Prix, while he finished 15th and 11th in the Qatar Grand Prix and Abu Dhabi Grand Prix, respectively. Albon finished the season 16th in the Drivers' Championship with 12 points.

==== 2025: Partnership with Sainz ====
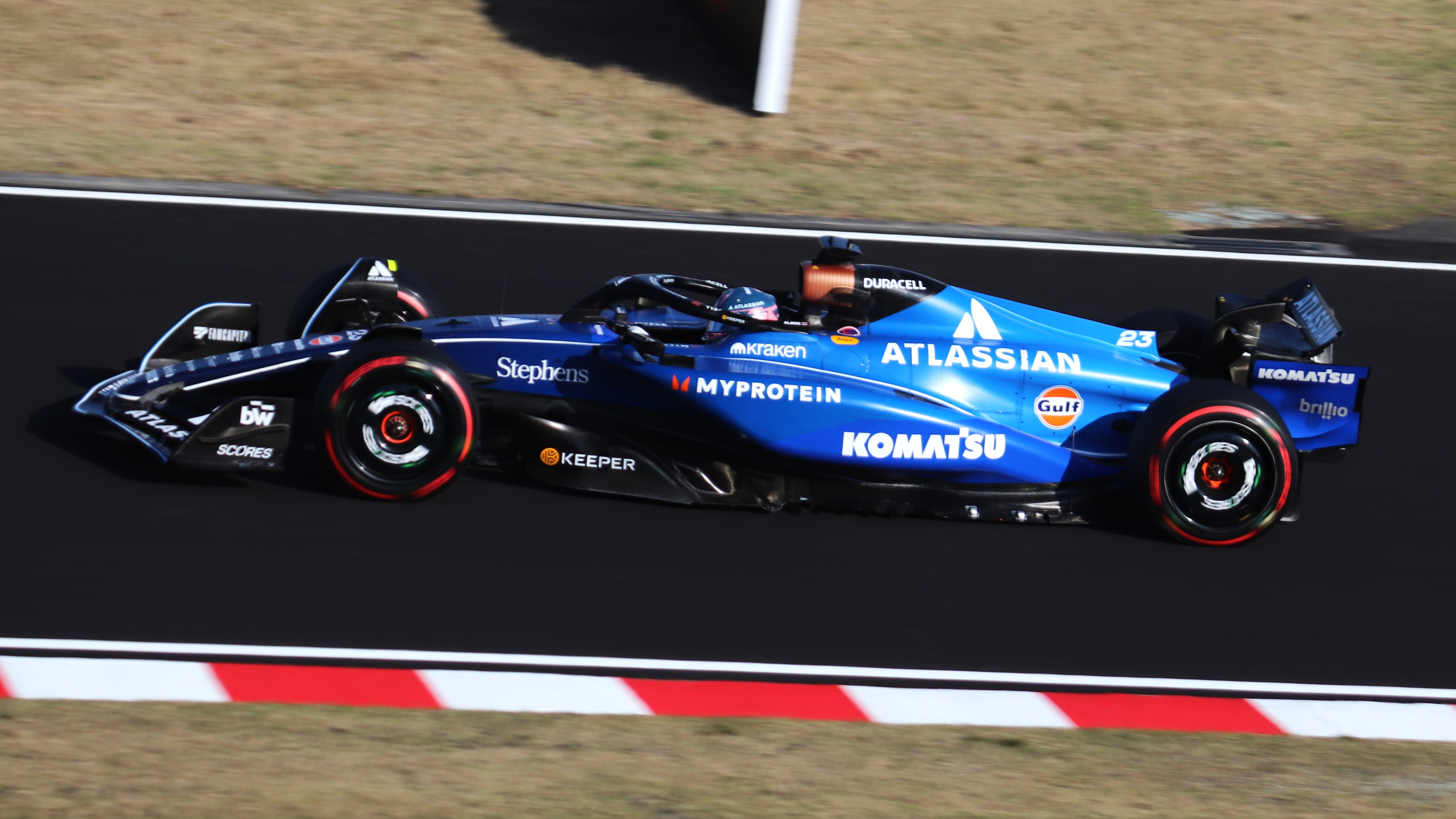
Albon (pictured at the Japanese Grand Prix) is partnered by Carlos Sainz Jr. from 2025 onwards

Albon partnered Carlos Sainz Jr. starting from 2025. He qualified sixth and finished fifth at the rain-affected Australian Grand Prix. He then finished seventh at the Chinese Grand Prix after disqualifications for Charles Leclerc and Lewis Hamilton. He achieved a further points finish with ninth in Japan, before claiming twelfth in Bahrain. He returned to ninth at the Saudi Arabian Grand Prix.

Albon finished fifth again in both Miami and Emilia-Romagna, scoring ten points each. After not finishing in three straight races–Spain, Canada, and Austria–he finished eighth in Great Britain and sixth in Belgium. Later on, he finished fifth again in the Netherlands and seventh at Monza, earning ten and six points respectively. His final points of the year came in the COTA sprint race, in which he finished sixth. Albon finished the season in 8th place in the Drivers' Championship with 73 points, ahead of his teammate.

==== 2026: New regulations ====
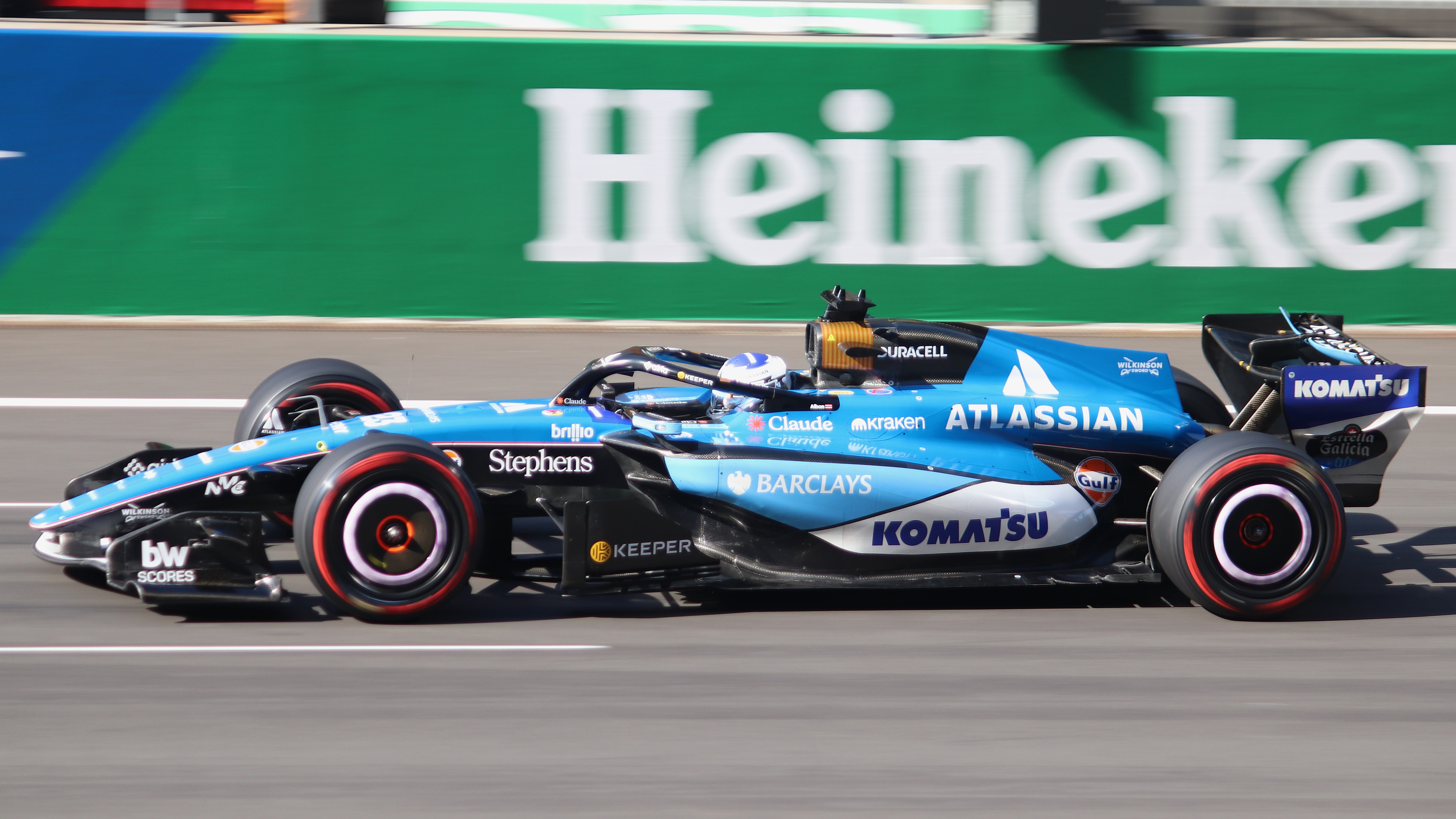
Albon driving for Williams at the 2026 Chinese Grand Prix during Qualifying

Albon remained at Williams alongside Carlos Sainz Jr for the new power unit and chassis regulations in 2026. He opened the season with a twelfth place finish at the Australian Grand Prix, before failing to start at the Chinese Grand Prix because of a hydraulics issue. He scored his first point of the season with a tenth place finish at the Miami Grand Prix, but did not finish the following race in Canada after a collision with McLaren driver Oscar Piastri. Albon scored four more points with an eighth place finish at the Monaco Grand Prix. At Barcelona, Albon finished the race but was not classified as he did not complete 90% of the race distance because of a mechanical issue. He retired from the race at Silverstone after a collision with Haas driver Ollie Bearman on the first lap. He finished fifteenth in Belgium, and seventeenth in Hungary.

Following the summer break, Albon finished sixteenth in the Dutch Grand Prix sprint. However, he did not finish the main race as he was forced to retire the car after a collision with teammate Sainz. This was followed by a seventeenth-place finish at the Italian Grand Prix and a fifteenth-place finish at the Spanish Grand Prix. In Baku, Albon qualified thirteenth, but crashed on the thirty-first lap of the race. He retired from the Bahrain Grand Prix due to a gearbox issue, did not finish at the Singapore Grand Prix sprint following a collision with Gabriel Bortoleto and Valtteri Bottas, and retired again on the final lap of the main race in Singapore due to overheating issues, but was classified eighteenth. This was followed by a seventeenth-place finish at the United States Grand Prix, and an eleventh-place classification at the Mexico City Grand Prix.

== Other racing ==
=== Formula E (2017) ===
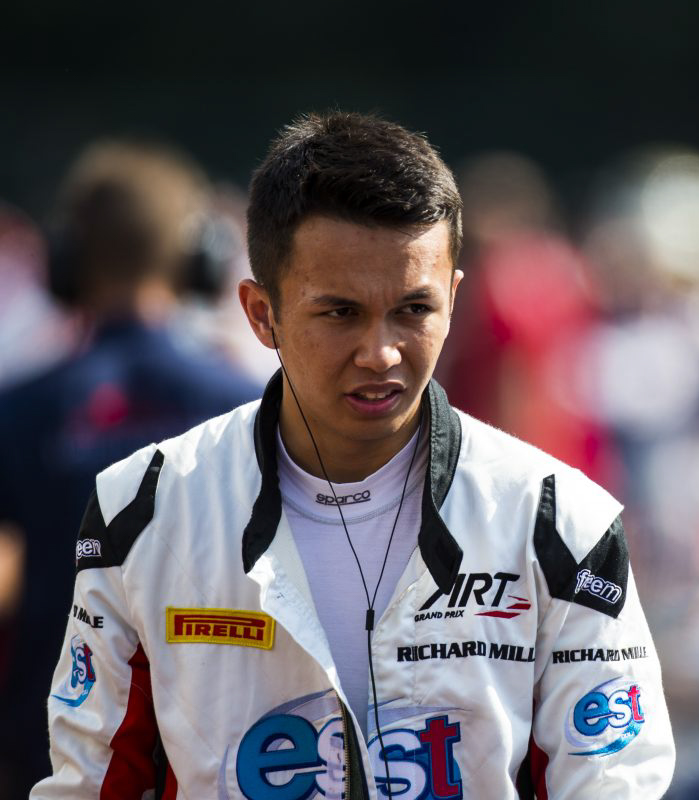
Albon at Formula E testing in Marrakesh, December 2017

Albon was signed by Nissan e.dams alongside Sébastien Buemi as one of its drivers for the 2018–19 Formula E season, but he was released before the start of the season to instead drive in the 2019 Formula One season for Toro Rosso.

Albon's place was taken by former F2 colleague Oliver Rowland, who previously competed in the 2015 Punta del Este ePrix as an injury replacement for Mahindra Racing's Nick Heidfeld.

=== DTM (2021) ===
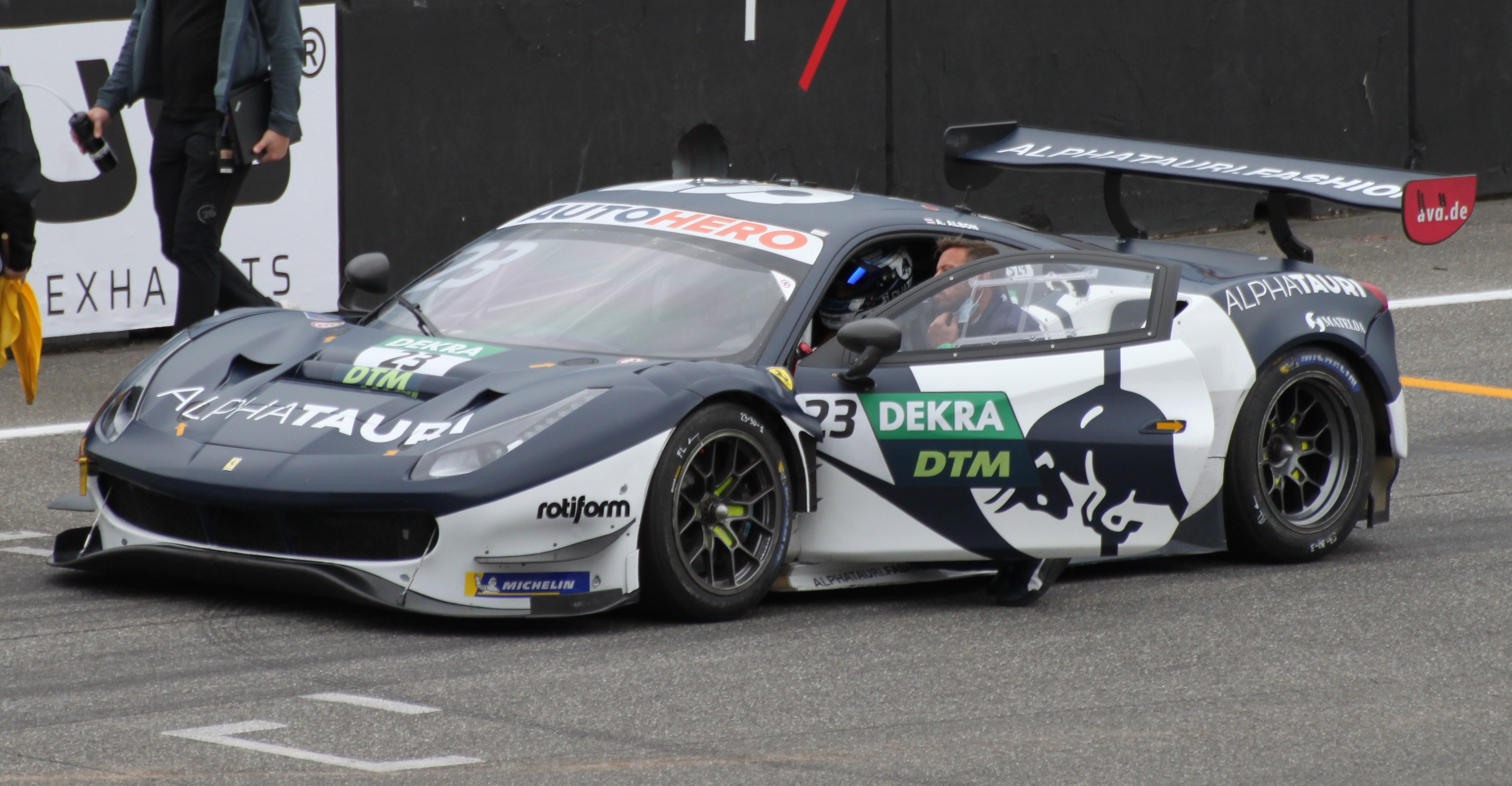
Albon at the Hockenheimring in 2021

Albon participated in 14 out of 16 races of the 2021 Deutsche Tourenwagen Masters, with Formula E driver Nick Cassidy taking his place for the final two races at the Norisring. He was driving for the Italian outfit AF Corse alongside Formula 2 driver Liam Lawson, with financial backing from Red Bull and AlphaTauri.

On 22 August 2021, Albon won his maiden DTM race at the Nürburgring, becoming the first Thai driver to win a DTM race.

== Personal life ==
Albon holds dual British and Thai nationality, and races under the Thai flag for sponsorship reasons. He is a practicing Buddhist. Albon and his family own a number of pets, consisting of at least twelve cats, a dog and two horses. He has been publicly dating Chinese LPGA golfer Lily He since 2019 after mutually developing interest in each other's sport. The couple announced their engagement in January 2026.

In interviews, Albon has spoken publicly about the mental pressure during his Formula 1 career. Whilst he was at Red Bull, he stated he was "destroyed mentally" from the pressures and criticism, and later he turned to a psychologist to improve his mental well-being and performance.

Albon has worked with performance coach and physiotherapist, Patrick Harding, who has supported him throughout his Formula 1 career, including at both Red Bull and Williams.

Albon is childhood friends with fellow Formula 1 driver George Russell, racing together since junior karting days.

== Karting record ==
=== Karting career summary ===
Season	Series	Team	Position
2006	Kartmasters British Grand Prix — Comer Cadet		1st
2006	Super 1 National Championship — Comer Cadet		17th
2006	Super 1 National Championship — Honda Cadet		1st
2007	Kartmasters British Grand Prix — Comer Cadet		6th
2007	British Open Championship — Honda Cadet		3rd
2007	Super 1 National Championship — Comer Cadet		2nd
2007	MSA British Championship — Cadet		4th
2008	Kartmasters British Grand Prix — KF3		1st
2008	BRDC Stars of Tomorrow Championship — KF3		2nd
2008	Super 1 National Championship — KF3		3rd
2009	Formula Kart Stars — KF3		1st
2009	Super 1 National Championship — KF3		1st
2009	KF Winter Series — KF3		1st
2009	WSK International Series — KF3	Mick Barrett Racing	5th
2010	South Garda Winter Cup — KF3	Intrepid Driver Program	3rd
2010	Andrea Margutti Trophy — KF3	Intrepid Driver Program	NC
2010	WSK Euro Series — KF3	Intrepid Driver Program	2nd
2010	CIK-FIA European Championship — KF3	Intrepid Driver Program	1st
2010	CIK-FIA World Cup — KF3	Intrepid Driver Program	1st
2010	Monaco Kart Cup — KF3	Intrepid Driver Program	4th
2011	South Garda Winter Cup — KF2	Intrepid Driver Program	4th
2011	WSK Super Master Series — KF2	Intrepid Driver Program	10th
2011	WSK Euro Series — KF1	Intrepid Driver Program	2nd
2011	CIK-FIA World Championship — KF1	Intrepid Driver Program	2nd

== Racing record ==
=== Racing career summary ===
Season	Series	Team	Races	Wins	Poles	F/Laps	Podiums	Points	Position
2012	Eurocup Formula Renault 2.0	EPIC Racing	14	0	0	0	0	0	38th
2012	Formula Renault 2.0 Alps	EPIC Racing	14	0	0	0	0	26	16th
2013	Eurocup Formula Renault 2.0	KTR	14	0	1	1	0	22	16th
2013	Formula Renault 2.0 NEC	KTR	6	0	0	1	1	61	22nd
2014	Eurocup Formula Renault 2.0	KTR	14	0	1	0	3	117	**3rd**
2014	Formula Renault 2.0 NEC	KTR	6	1	0	1	2	80	17th
2015	FIA Formula 3 European Championship	Signature	33	0	2	1	5	187	7th
2015	Macau Grand Prix	Signature	1	0	0	0	0	—N/a	13th
2016	GP3 Series	ART Grand Prix	18	4	3	3	7	177	**2nd**
2016	Masters of Formula 3	Hitech GP	1	0	0	0	0	—N/a	5th
2017	FIA Formula 2 Championship	ART Grand Prix	20	0	0	1	2	86	10th
2018	FIA Formula 2 Championship	DAMS	24	4	3	0	8	212	**3rd**
2019	Formula One	Red Bull Toro Rosso Honda	12	0	0	0	0	92	8th
2019	Formula One	Aston Martin Red Bull Racing	9	0	0	0	0	92	8th
2020	Formula One	Aston Martin Red Bull Racing	17	0	0	0	2	105	7th
2021	Deutsche Tourenwagen Masters	AlphaTauri AF Corse	14	1	1	3	4	130	6th
2021	Formula One	Red Bull Racing Honda	Reserve driver						
2021	Formula One	Scuderia AlphaTauri	Reserve driver						
2022	Formula One	Williams Racing	22	0	0	0	0	4	19th
2023	Formula One	Williams Racing	22	0	0	0	0	27	13th
2024	Formula One	Williams Racing	24	0	0	0	0	12	16th
2025	Formula One	Atlassian Williams Racing	24	0	0	1	0	73	8th
2026	Formula One	Atlassian Williams F1 Team	21	0	0	0	0	5*	19th*

* Season still in progress.

=== Complete Formula Renault 2.0 Alps Series results ===
(key) (Races in bold indicate pole position) (Races in italics indicate fastest lap)

Year	Entrant	1	2	3	4	5	6	7	8	9	10	11	12	13	14	Pos	Points
2012	EPIC Racing	MNZ; 1 Ret	MNZ; 2 Ret	PAU; 1 Ret	PAU; 2; 10	IMO; 1; 10	IMO; 2; 6	SPA; 1; 8	SPA; 2 Ret	RBR; 1; 5	RBR; 2; 11	MUG; 1; 17	MUG; 2; 9	CAT; 1; 14	CAT; 2 Ret	16th	26

=== Complete Eurocup Formula Renault 2.0 results ===
(key) (Races in bold indicate pole position) (Races in italics indicate fastest lap)

Year	Entrant	1	2	3	4	5	6	7	8	9	10	11	12	13	14	Pos	Points
2012	EPIC Racing	ALC; 1; 21	ALC; 2; 24	SPA; 1; 19	SPA; 2; 20	NÜR; 1; 23	NÜR; 2 Ret	MSC; 1 Ret	MSC; 2 DNS	HUN; 1; 17	HUN; 2; 24	LEC; 1; 19	LEC; 2; 24	CAT; 1 Ret	CAT; 2; 26	38th	0
2013	KTR	ALC; 1; 22	ALC; 2 Ret	SPA; 1; 14	SPA; 2; 27	MSC; 1; 8	MSC; 2; 11	**RBR**; **1**; 10	RBR; 2; 5	HUN; 1; 20	HUN; 2; 17	LEC; 1 Ret	LEC; 2; 17	CAT; 1 Ret	CAT; 2; 7	16th	22
2014	KTR	ALC; 1; 4	ALC; 2; 9	SPA; 1; 4	SPA; 2; 37	MSC; 1; 11	MSC; 2; 3	**NÜR**; **1**; 2	NÜR; 2; 13	HUN; 1; 7	HUN; 2; 6	LEC; 1; 3	LEC; 2; 13	JER; 1; 4	JER; 2; 5	3rd	117

=== Complete Formula Renault 2.0 NEC results ===
(key) (Races in bold indicate pole position) (Races in italics indicate fastest lap)

Year	Entrant	1	2	3	4	5	6	7	8	9	10	11	12	13	14	15	16	17	DC	Points
2013	KTR	HOC; 1; 32	HOC; 2; 9	HOC; 3; 23	NÜR; 1	NÜR; 2	SIL; 1	SIL; 2	SPA; 1	SPA; 2	ASS; 1	ASS; 2	MST; 1; 8	MST; 2; 9	MST; 3; 2	ZAN; 1	ZAN; 2	ZAN; 3	22nd	61
2014	KTR	MNZ; 1; 6	MNZ; 2; 18	SIL; 1	SIL; 2	HOC; 1	HOC; 2	HOC; 3	SPA; 1	SPA; 2	ASS; 1; 5	ASS; 2 Ret	MST; 1; 2	MST; 2; 1	MST; 3 C	NÜR; 1	NÜR; 2	NÜR; 3	17th	88

=== Complete FIA Formula 3 European Championship results ===
(key) (Races in bold indicate pole position) (Races in italics indicate fastest lap)

Year	Entrant	Engine	1	2	3	4	5	6	7	8	9	10	11	12	13	14	15	16	17	18	19	20	21	22	23	24	25	26	27	28	29	30	31	32	33	DC	Points
2015	Signature	Volkswagen	SIL; 1; 4	SIL; 2; 6	SIL; 3; 6	HOC; 1; 13	HOC; 2; 8	HOC; 3; 9	PAU; 1; 5	PAU; 2; 7	PAU; 3 NC	MNZ; 1; 21	MNZ; 2 WD	MNZ; 3 WD	SPA; 1; 3	SPA; 2; 16	SPA; 3; 9	NOR; 1; 5	**NOR**; **2**; 2	**NOR**; **3**; 3	ZAN; 1; 7	ZAN; 2; 4	ZAN; 3; 8	RBR; 1; 7	RBR; 2; 5	RBR; 3; 8	ALG; 1; 2	ALG; 2; 12	ALG; 3 Ret	NÜR; 1; 12	NÜR; 2; 14	NÜR; 3; 11	HOC; 1; 11	HOC; 2 Ret	HOC; 3; 2	7th	187

=== Complete Macau Grand Prix results ===
Year	Team	Car	Qualifying	Quali Race	Main race	Ref
2015	(France) Signature	Dallara F312	15th	DNF	13th	

=== Complete GP3 Series results ===
(key) (Races in bold indicate pole position) (Races in italics indicate fastest lap)

Year	Entrant	1	2	3	4	5	6	7	8	9	10	11	12	13	14	15	16	17	18	Pos	Points
2016	ART Grand Prix	CAT; FEA; 6	CAT; SPR; 1	RBR; FEA; 2	RBR; SPR; 2	**SIL**; **FEA**; 1	SIL; SPR; 14	HUN; FEA; 7	HUN; SPR; 1	**HOC**; **FEA**; 4	HOC; SPR; Ret	SPA; FEA; 9	SPA; SPR; 10	MNZ; FEA; 6	MNZ; SPR; 2	SEP; FEA; 1	SEP; SPR; 8	**YMC**; **FEA**; Ret	YMC; FEA; Ret	2nd	177

=== Complete FIA Formula 2 Championship results ===
(key) (Races in bold indicate pole position) (Races in italics indicate points for the fastest lap of top ten finishers)

Year	Entrant	1	2	3	4	5	6	7	8	9	10	11	12	13	14	15	16	17	18	19	20	21	22	23	24	DC	Points
2017	ART Grand Prix	BHR; FEA; 6	BHR; SPR; 7	CAT; FEA; 5	CAT; SPR; 8	MON; FEA; 4	MON; SPR; 6	BAK; FEA	BAK; SPR	RBR; FEA; 5	RBR; SPR; 2	SIL; FEA; 18	SIL; SPR; 10	HUN; FEA; 8	HUN; SPR; 7	SPA; FEA; 12	SPA; SPR; 18	MNZ; FEA; 14	MNZ; SPR; 8	JER; FEA; 12	JER; SPR; 9	YMC; FEA; 7	YMC; SPR; 2			10th	86
2018	DAMS	BHR; FEA; 4	BHR; SPR; 13	**BAK**; **FEA**; 1	BAK; SPR; 13	**CAT**; **FEA**; 5	CAT; SPR; 2	**MON**; **FEA**; Ret	MON; SPR; Ret	LEC; FEA; Ret	LEC; SPR; 7	RBR; FEA; 5	RBR; SPR; 5	SIL; FEA; 1	SIL; SPR; 7	HUN; FEA; 5	HUN; SPR; 1	SPA; FEA; 5	SPA; SPR; 3	MNZ; FEA; 3	MNZ; SPR; Ret	SOC; FEA; 1	SOC; SPR; 3	YMC; FEA; 14	YMC; SPR; 8	3rd	212

=== Complete Formula One results ===
(key) (Races in bold indicate pole position; races in italics indicate fastest lap)

Year	Entrant	Chassis	Engine	1	2	3	4	5	6	7	8	9	10	11	12	13	14	15	16	17	18	19	20	21	22	23	24	WDC	Points
2019	Red Bull Toro Rosso Honda	Scuderia Toro Rosso STR14	Honda RA619H 1.6 V6 t	AUS; 14	BHR; 9	CHN; 10	AZE; 11	ESP; 11	MON; 8	CAN; Ret	FRA; 15	AUT; 15	GBR; 12	GER; 6	HUN; 10													8th	92
2019	Aston Martin Red Bull Racing	Red Bull Racing RB15	Honda RA619H 1.6 V6 t													BEL; 5	ITA; 6	SIN; 6	RUS; 5	JPN; 4	MEX; 5	USA; 5	BRA; 14	ABU; 6				8th	92
2020	Aston Martin Red Bull Racing	Red Bull Racing RB16	Honda RA620H 1.6 V6 t	AUT; 13†	STY; 4	HUN; 5	GBR; 8	70A; 5	ESP; 8	BEL; 6	ITA; 15	TUS; 3	RUS; 10	EIF; Ret	POR; 12	EMI; 15	TUR; 7	BHR; 3	SKH; 6	ABU; 4								7th	105
2022	Williams Racing	Williams FW44	Mercedes-AMG F1 M13 V6 t	BHR; 13	SAU; 14†	AUS; 10	EMI; 11	MIA; 9	ESP; 18	MON; Ret	AZE; 12	CAN; 13	GBR; Ret	AUT; 12	FRA; 13	HUN; 17	BEL; 10	NED; 12	ITA; WD	SIN; Ret	JPN; Ret	USA; 13	MXC; 12	SAP; 15	ABU; 13			19th	4
2023	Williams Racing	Williams FW45	Mercedes-AMG F1 M14 V6 t	BHR; 10	SAU; Ret	AUS; Ret	AZE; 12	MIA; 14	MON; 14	ESP; 16	CAN; 7	AUT; 11	GBR; 8	HUN; 11	BEL; 14	NED; 8	ITA; 7	SIN; 11	JPN; Ret	QAT; 13^{7}	USA; 9	MXC; 9	SAP; Ret	LVG; 12	ABU; 14			13th	27
2024	Williams Racing	Williams FW46	Mercedes-AMG F1 M15 V6 t	BHR; 15	SAU; 11	AUS; 11	JPN; Ret	CHN; 12	MIA; 18	EMI; Ret	MON; 9	CAN; Ret	ESP; 18	AUT; 15	GBR; 9	HUN; 14	BEL; 12	NED; 14	ITA; 9	AZE; 7	SIN; Ret	USA; 16	MXC; Ret	SAP; DNS	LVG; Ret	QAT; 15	ABU; 11	16th	12
2025	Atlassian Williams Racing	Williams FW47	Mercedes-AMG F1 M16 V6 t	AUS; 5	CHN; 7	JPN; 9	BHR; 12	SAU; 9	MIA; 5	EMI; 5	MON; 9	ESP; Ret	CAN; Ret	AUT; Ret	GBR; 8	BEL; 6	HUN; 15	NED; 5	ITA; 7	AZE; 13	SIN; 14	USA; 14^{6}	MXC; 12	SAP; 11	LVG; Ret	QAT; 11	ABU; 16	8th	73
2026	Atlassian Williams F1 Team	Williams FW48	Mercedes-AMG F1 M17 V6 t	AUS; 12	CHN; DNS	JPN; 20	MIA; 10	CAN; Ret	MON; 8	BCN; NC	AUT; 17	GBR; Ret	BEL; 15	HUN; 17	NED; 17†	ITA; 17	ESP; 15	AZE; Ret	BHR; Ret	SIN; 18†	USA; 17	MXC; 11	SAP; 15	LVG	QAT	ABU		19th*	5*

^{†} Did not finish, but was classified as he had completed more than 90% of the race distance.
* Season still in progress.

=== Complete Deutsche Tourenwagen Masters results ===
(key) (Races in bold indicate pole position) (Races in italics indicate fastest lap)

Year	Team	Car	1	2	3	4	5	6	7	8	9	10	11	12	13	14	15	16	Pos	Points
2021	AlphaTauri AF Corse	Ferrari 488 GT3 Evo 2020	MNZ; 1; 3	MNZ; 2; 7	LAU; 1; 5	LAU; 2; 11	ZOL; 1; 3	ZOL; 2; 6	NÜR; 1 Ret	**NÜR**; **2**; 1^{1}	RBR; 1; 4	RBR; 2; 17	ASS; 1 Ret	ASS; 2; 5	HOC; 1; 2	HOC; 2; 6	NOR; 1	NOR; 2	6th	130

== Notes ==
Awards
Preceded by Charles Leclerc	Autosport Awards; Rookie of the Year; 2019	Succeeded by Oscar Piastri
Preceded by Charles Leclerc	FIA Rookie of the Year; 2019	Succeeded by Yuki Tsunoda
