= Formula One drivers from Thailand =

List of Formula One drivers who have competed under the Thai flag

- Drivers: 2
- Grands Prix: 168
- Entries: 168
- Starts: 165
- Best season finish: 7th (2020)
- Wins: 0
- Podiums: 2
- Pole positions: 0
- Fastest laps: 1
- Points: 326
- First entry: 1950 British Grand Prix
- Latest entry: 2026 Mexico City Grand Prix
- 2026 drivers: Alex Albon

As of 2026, there have been two Formula One drivers from Thailand. Thai drivers have entered 168 Formula One Grands Prix, scoring 326 points between them.

Alex Albon is the only Thai driver to have achieved a podium or set the fastest lap. No Thai driver has ever won a race or taken pole position.

Prince Birabongse Bhanudej, who competed as Prince Bira, made his debut in 1950 in a Maserati, racing for Enrico Platé. Thailand's second driver, Alex Albon, made his debut in 2019 with Toro Rosso, before being promoted to Red Bull Racing after 12 races. In 2022, he joined Williams Racing.

== Current drivers ==
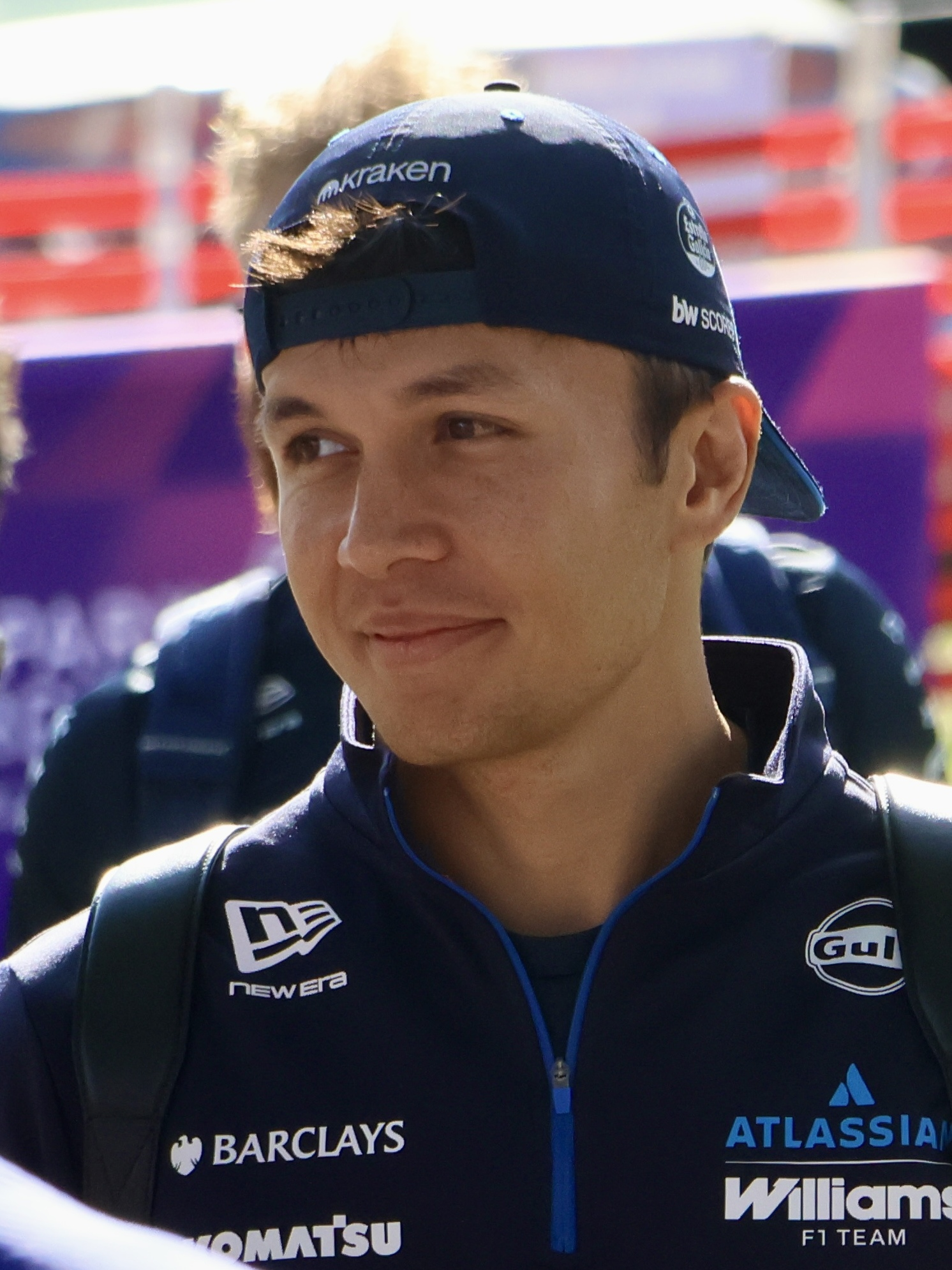
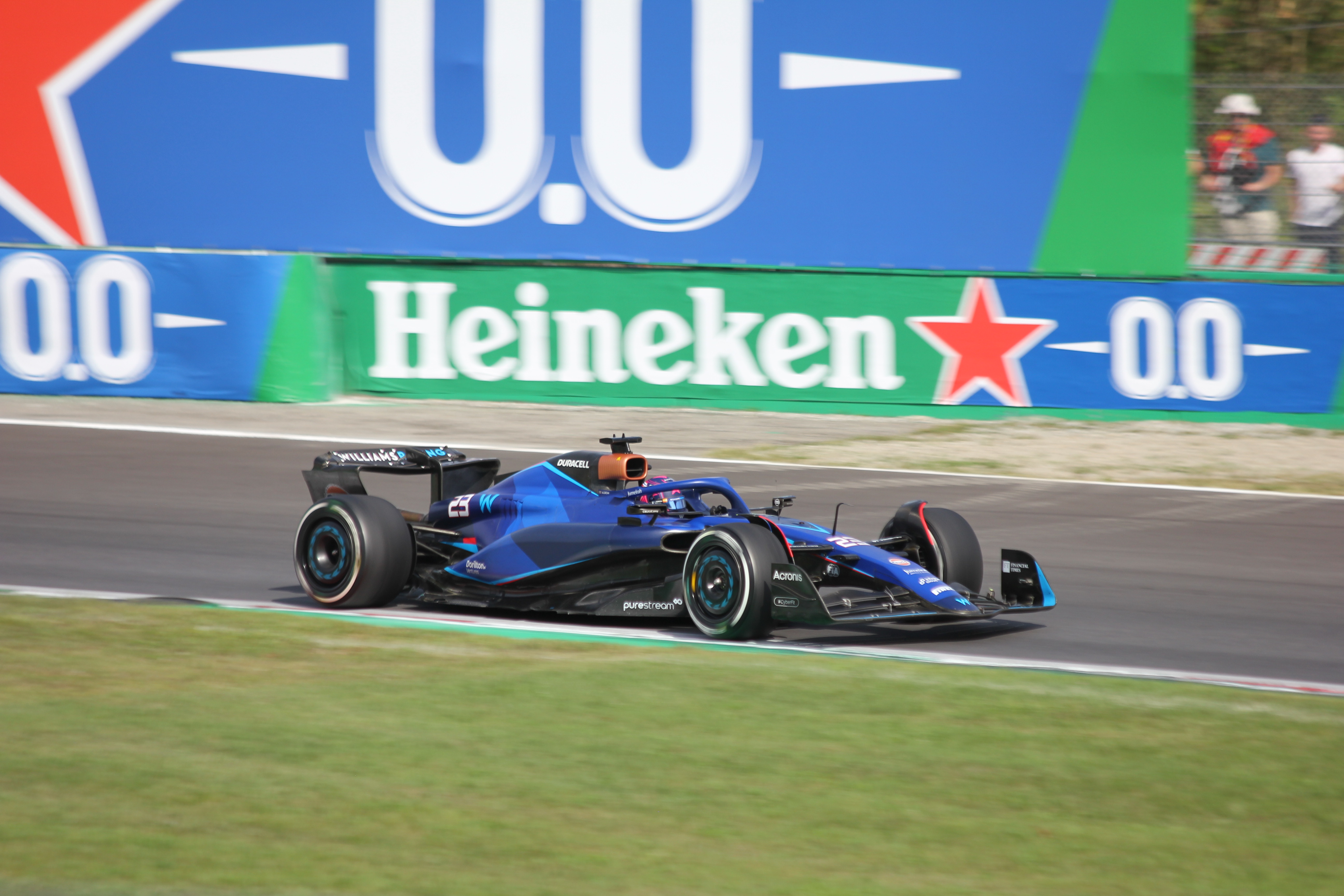
Alex Albon, who is 19th in the 2026 World Drivers' Championship. Albon driving for Williams at the 2023 Italian Grand Prix.

Alex Albon is the second Formula One driver to race under the Thai flag. He made his debut at the 2019 Australian Grand Prix for Toro Rosso. He scored 16 points with the team, (Note: He finished within the points at the 2019 Bahrain, Chinese, Monaco, German, and the Hungarian Grands Prix.) before being promoted to Red Bull Racing ahead of the 2019 Belgian Grand Prix. He ended the season with 92 points, finishing 8th in the World Drivers' Championship.

Albon achieved his, and Thailand's, only two podiums at the 2020 Tuscan and Bahrain Grands Prix. He finished 2020 in 7th place with 105 points, and was demoted to reserve driver for the following season with Sergio Perez taking his seat at Red Bull Racing.

Albon returned to the sport in 2022 with Williams Racing, where he has been racing ever since. During this time, he has driven over one hundred races with the team, surpassing Nigel Mansell's record for most race starts with them. He also achieved his, and Thailand's, first and only fastest lap at the 2025 São Paulo Grand Prix.

== Former drivers ==
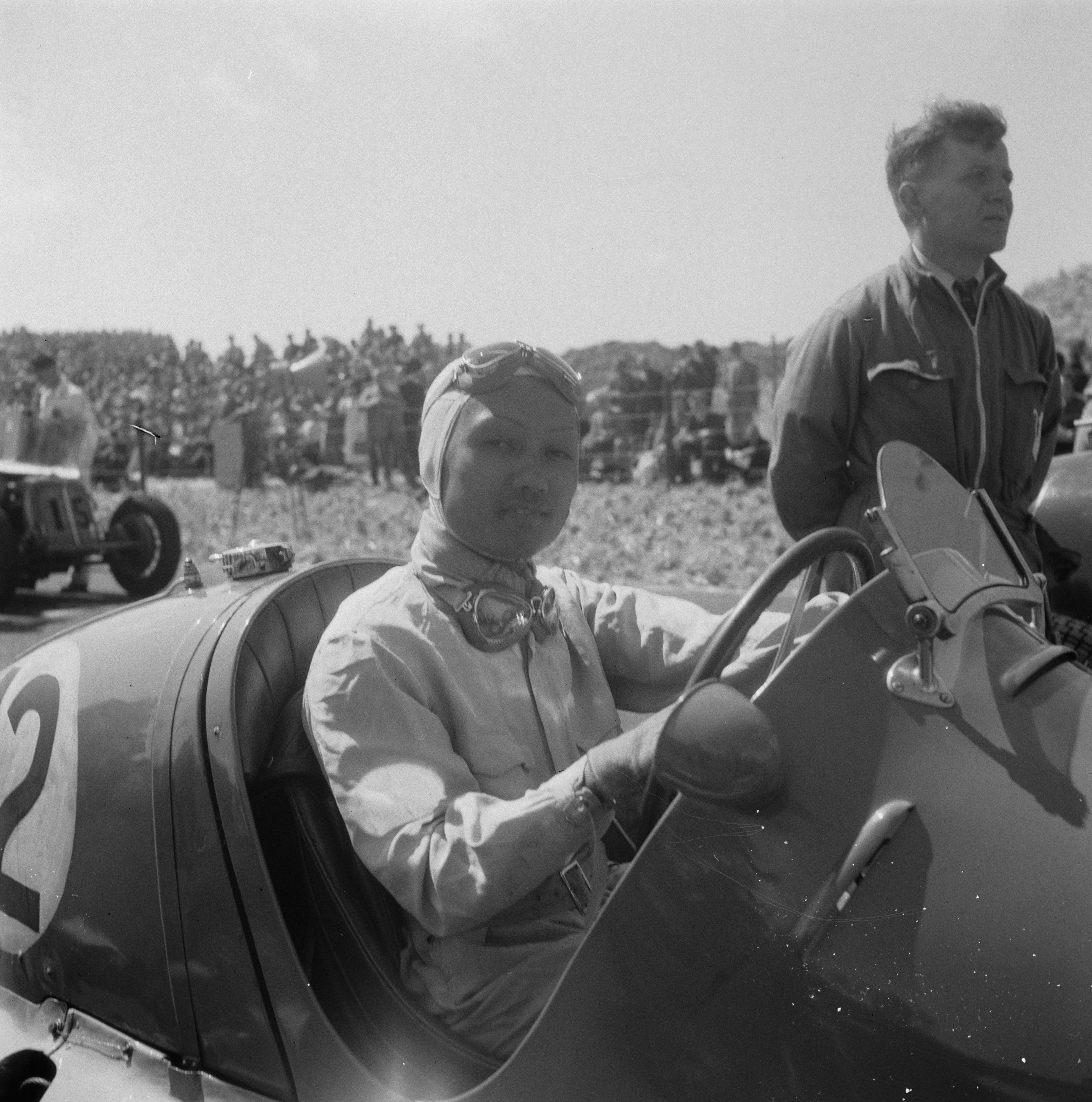
Prince Bira at the 1948 Zandvoort Grand Prix.

Prince Bira was the first Thai Formula One driver. He was also the only Southeast Asian driver to compete in the sport until Alex Yoong joined in 2001. Between 1950 and 1955, he entered twenty-one Formula World Championship races and started nineteen. He drove in the sport's inaugural race, starting fifth in Enrico Platé's Maserati 4CLT, before ultimately retiring due to a fuel shortage. Over his career, he also raced for Gordini and Connaught, Scuderia Milano and two privateer teams he owned.

Bira scored 8 points in Formula One. His highest finish was fourth, which he achieved at both the 1950 Swiss Grand Prix and the 1954 French Grand Prix. He finished 8th and 17th in the 1950 and 1954 seasons, respectively. He was not classified in the World Drivers' Championship for the other four years of his career.

The Bira Circuit, opened in 1986, is named after him.

== All-time table ==
Drivers	Active Years	Entries	Wins	Podiums	Career Points	Poles	Fastest Laps
Prince Bira	1950–1954	22 entries (19 starts)	0	0	8	0	0
Alex Albon	2019–2020, 2022–2026	149 (146 starts)	0	2	318	0	1
