= 2019 Monaco Grand Prix =

6th round of the 2019 Formula One season

Race 6 of 21 in the 2019 Formula One World Championship
← Previous race	Next race →
- Layout of the Circuit de Monte Carlo, Monaco

Race details
- Date: 26 May 2019
- Official name: Formula 1 Grand Prix de Monaco 2019
- Location: Circuit de Monaco; La Condamine and Monte Carlo, Monaco
- Course: Street circuit
- Course length: 3.337 km (2.074 miles)
- Distance: 78 laps, 260.286 km (161.734 miles)
- Weather: Overcast

Pole position
Driver	(United Kingdom) Lewis Hamilton	Mercedes
- Time: 1:10.166

Fastest lap
Driver	(France) Pierre Gasly	Red Bull Racing-Honda
- Time: 1:14.279 on lap 72

Podium
First	(United Kingdom) Lewis Hamilton	Mercedes
Second	(Germany) Sebastian Vettel	Ferrari
Third	(Finland) Valtteri Bottas	Mercedes

The 2019 Monaco Grand Prix (formally known as the Formula 1 Grand Prix de Monaco 2019) was a Formula One motor race held on 26 May 2019 at the Circuit de Monaco, a street circuit that runs through the Principality of Monaco. It was the 6th round of the 2019 Formula One World Championship, the 77th time that the Monaco Grand Prix was held, and the 66th time it had been held as a round of the Formula One World Championship since the inception of the series in 1950.

The race was won by Lewis Hamilton after starting from pole, with Sebastian Vettel and Valtteri Bottas promoted to second and third place respectively after Max Verstappen received a penalty, demoting him to fourth place.

== Background ==
=== Championship standings before the race ===
Heading into the race Lewis Hamilton held a 7-point lead over teammate Valtteri Bottas in the Drivers' Championship. In the Constructors' Championship, Mercedes held a 96-point advantage over Ferrari.

=== Entrants ===
The drivers and teams were the same as the season entry list with no additional stand-in drivers for either the race or practice. This race saw Alfa Romeo driver Kimi Räikkönen celebrate his 300th Grand Prix entry.

=== Events preceding the race ===
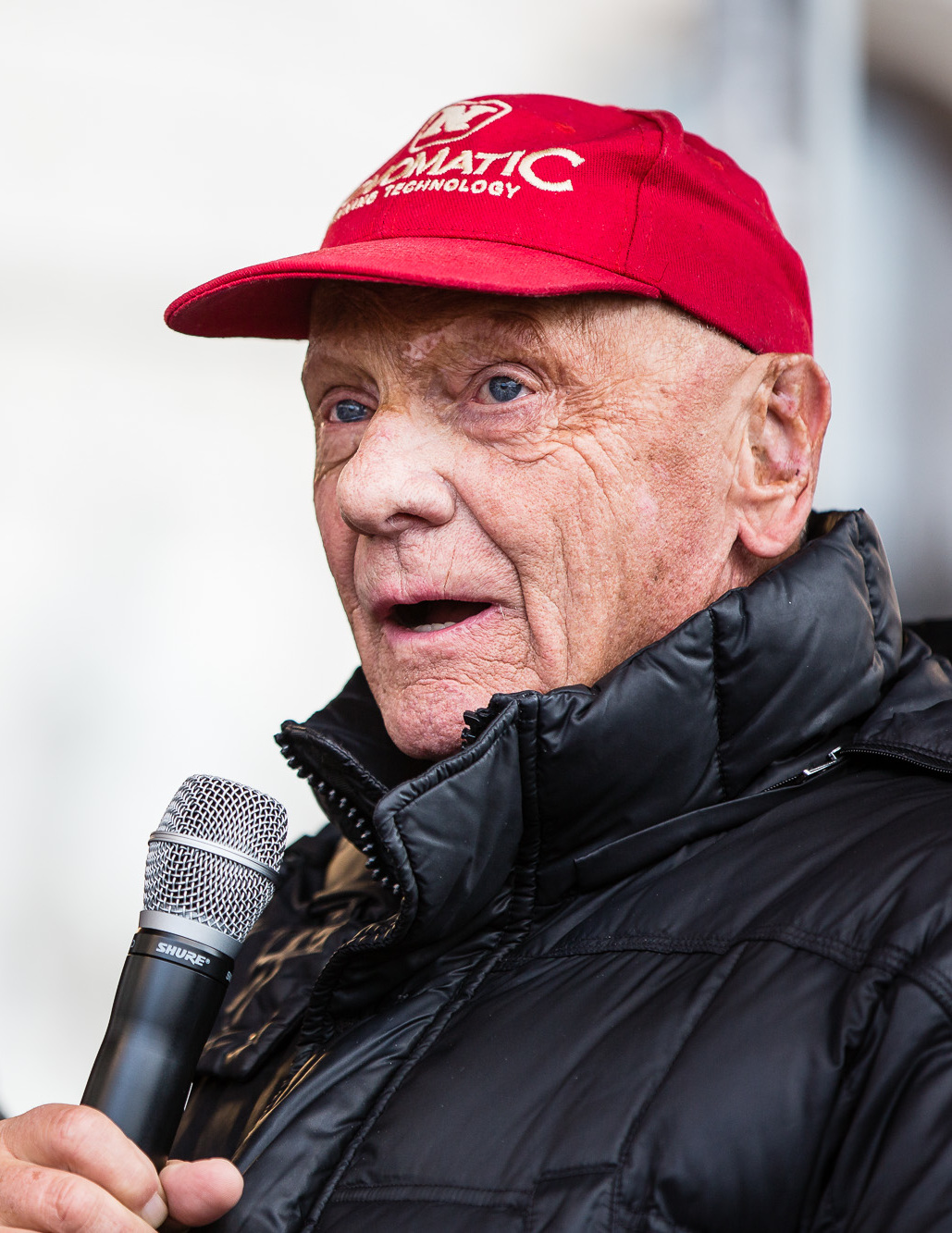
Niki Lauda (pictured in 2016) died less than a week before the race.

On 20 May, less than a week before the race, three-time world champion Niki Lauda died at the age of 70, after a long period of ill health. All teams had since paid tribute to Lauda on the weekend, with Mercedes, whom Lauda had been a key personnel, paid the highest tributes by painting their halos red and including a red three-pointed star on the engine cover on their cars until the remainder of the season.

== Qualifying ==
During the first qualifying session, Nico Hülkenberg was blocked on his first flying lap by Antonio Giovinazzi at turn 17. Giovinazzi was later handed a three-place grid penalty. Around halfway through the session, after most drivers had come into the pits, Charles Leclerc had set the sixth fastest time. However, Ferrari decided not to send him out again in order to save tyres. As other drivers began to improve their lap times, Leclerc fell down the order and was eventually eliminated from Q1 by teammate Sebastian Vettel, the last driver to cross the line. Ferrari later admitted this was a team mistake. Vettel's final lap was the fastest of the session.

In the second qualifying session, Pierre Gasly impeded Romain Grosjean, and was later given a three-place grid penalty. Max Verstappen set the fastest time of the session.

Lewis Hamilton took pole position with a new track record ahead of teammate Valtteri Bottas. As a result, Mercedes equalled the record for most front row lockouts, and Hamilton took the record for most pole positions with one constructor. Max Verstappen qualified in third, his highest qualifying position of the year.

=== Qualifying classification ===
Pos.	No.	Driver	Constructor	Qualifying times			Final grid
Pos.	No.	Driver	Constructor	Q1	Q2	Q3	Final grid
1	44	(United Kingdom) Lewis Hamilton	Mercedes	1:11.542	1:10.835	1:10.166	1
2	77	(Finland) Valtteri Bottas	Mercedes	1:11.562	1:10.701	1:10.252	2
3	33	(Netherlands) Max Verstappen	Red Bull Racing-Honda	1:11.597	1:10.618	1:10.641	3
4	5	(Germany) Sebastian Vettel	Ferrari	1:11.434	1:11.227	1:10.947	4
5	10	(France) Pierre Gasly	Red Bull Racing-Honda	1:11.740	1:11.457	1:11.041	8^{a}
6	20	(Denmark) Kevin Magnussen	Haas-Ferrari	1:11.865	1:11.363	1:11.109	5
7	3	(Australia) Daniel Ricciardo	Renault	1:11.767	1:11.543	1:11.218	6
8	26	(Russia) Daniil Kvyat	Scuderia Toro Rosso-Honda	1:11.602	1:11.412	1:11.271	7
9	55	(Spain) Carlos Sainz Jr.	McLaren-Renault	1:11.872	1:11.608	1:11.417	9
10	23	(Thailand) Alexander Albon	Scuderia Toro Rosso-Honda	1:12.007	1:11.429	1:11.653	10
11	27	(Germany) Nico Hülkenberg	Renault	1:12.097	1:11.670	N/A	11
12	4	(United Kingdom) Lando Norris	McLaren-Renault	1:11.845	1:11.724	N/A	12
13	8	(France) Romain Grosjean	Haas-Ferrari	1:11.837	1:12.027	N/A	13
14	7	(Finland) Kimi Räikkönen	Alfa Romeo Racing-Ferrari	1:11.993	1:12.115	N/A	14
15	99	(Italy) Antonio Giovinazzi	Alfa Romeo Racing-Ferrari	1:11.976	1:12.185	N/A	18^{a}
16	16	(Monaco) Charles Leclerc	Ferrari	1:12.149	N/A	N/A	15
17	11	(Mexico) Sergio Pérez	Racing Point-BWT Mercedes	1:12.233	N/A	N/A	16
18	18	(Canada) Lance Stroll	Racing Point-BWT Mercedes	1:12.846	N/A	N/A	17
19	63	(United Kingdom) George Russell	Williams-Mercedes	1:13.477	N/A	N/A	19
20	88	(Poland) Robert Kubica	Williams-Mercedes	1:13.751	N/A	N/A	20
107% time: 1:16.434

Notes

- ^a – Pierre Gasly and Antonio Giovinazzi each received three-place grid penalties for impeding other drivers during qualifying.

== Race ==
Before the race started, there was a moment of silence to pay respects to Lauda, with the majority of personnel and fans wearing red caps.

The opening lap proceeded cleanly, with Lewis Hamilton maintaining his lead from pole position. Charles Leclerc began to fight through the field after starting in 15th place. Leclerc had made it up to 12th by lap eight, but touched the inside wall at turn 17 during an overtake attempt on Nico Hülkenberg, sending his Ferrari into a spin. This contact caused a right-rear tyre puncture. Over the course of the next lap, Leclerc fell to last place as his tyre ripped apart and caused significant damage to the car's floor, spreading debris around the track. After emerging from the pits after a tyre change, he was a lap down on the leaders. A safety car was deployed on lap 11 for the marshals to clear the debris.

The leaders made their pit stops at the end of the lap, during the safety car period. Valtteri Bottas, Max Verstappen and Sebastian Vettel entered the pits all within one car length of each other. Verstappen's pit stop was faster than Bottas's, and Verstappen was released alongside, but slightly ahead of Bottas, with the two cars making contact. Bottas had no choice but to yield at the pit exit, losing second place to Verstappen. Bottas was brought into the pits again on the following lap for a switch from medium to hard-compound tyres and for the team to check for damage, emerging in fourth place behind Vettel.

Racing resumed on lap 15. On the same lap, Antonio Giovinazzi attempted an overtake on Robert Kubica at turn 17, making contact and sending the Williams into a spin. Kubica's car stopped whilst facing sideways at the exit of the turn, blocking the circuit and forcing Giovinazzi, Hülkenberg, Leclerc, Sergio Pérez and George Russell to stop on track and wait for him to move aside so that they could pass Kubica. Leclerc came into the pits on the following lap for a switch to soft-compound tyres, but on his out-lap, Ferrari decided that the floor damage caused by his lap eight incident was too great. Leclerc returned to the pits and retired from the race, continuing his streak of failing to finish his home Grand Prix, after retiring from the 2018 Monaco Grand Prix and from both races at the 2017 Monaco Formula 2 round.

On lap 22, Verstappen was issued a five-second time penalty for his unsafe release in the pits ten laps earlier. On lap 26, Giovinazzi was issued a penalty of ten seconds for causing the incident on lap 15. He later served his penalty in the pits. Verstappen spent the rest of the race attempting to overtake Hamilton, who was suffering on worn tyres, in order to build a lead and win the race despite his penalty. On lap 76, Verstappen mounted his only close challenge of the race, on the inside of turn 10. He made contact with the rear of the Mercedes, causing both cars to cut the chicane. Verstappen was unable to get close enough for an overtake on the subsequent laps, and Hamilton crossed the finish line to take victory. Verstappen's penalty saw him demoted from second to fourth, with Vettel and Bottas promoted to second and third respectively. This marked the sixth consecutive victory in 2019 for Mercedes, but the first time that season that the team did not take a 1–2 finish. Completing the top ten were Gasly (who set the fastest lap of the race), Sainz, Kvyat, Albon, Ricciardo and Grosjean (who was penalized from 9th), both Toro Rosso cars finishing in the points for the first time since the 2017 Spanish Grand Prix, and their best finish since the 2015 United States Grand Prix.

=== Race classification ===
Pos.	No.	Driver	Constructor	Laps	Time/Retired	Grid	Points
1	44	(United Kingdom) Lewis Hamilton	Mercedes	78	1:43:28.437	1	25
2	5	(Germany) Sebastian Vettel	Ferrari	78	+2.602	4	18
3	77	(Finland) Valtteri Bottas	Mercedes	78	+3.162	2	15
4	33	(Netherlands) Max Verstappen	Red Bull Racing-Honda	78	+5.537^{1}	3	12
5	10	(France) Pierre Gasly	Red Bull Racing-Honda	78	+9.946	8	11^{2}
6	55	(Spain) Carlos Sainz Jr.	McLaren-Renault	78	+53.454	9	8
7	26	(Russia) Daniil Kvyat	Scuderia Toro Rosso-Honda	78	+54.574	7	6
8	23	(Thailand) Alexander Albon	Scuderia Toro Rosso-Honda	78	+55.200	10	4
9	3	(Australia) Daniel Ricciardo	Renault	78	+1:00.894	6	2
10	8	(France) Romain Grosjean	Haas-Ferrari	78	+1:01.034^{3}	13	1
11	4	(United Kingdom) Lando Norris	McLaren-Renault	78	+1:06.801	12	
12	11	(Mexico) Sergio Pérez	Racing Point-BWT Mercedes	77	+1 lap	16	
13	27	(Germany) Nico Hülkenberg	Renault	77	+1 lap	11	
14	20	(Denmark) Kevin Magnussen	Haas-Ferrari	77	+1 lap^{4}	5	
15	63	(United Kingdom) George Russell	Williams-Mercedes	77	+1 lap	19	
16	18	(Canada) Lance Stroll	Racing Point-BWT Mercedes	77	+1 lap^{5}	17	
17	7	(Finland) Kimi Räikkönen	Alfa Romeo Racing-Ferrari	77	+1 lap	14	
18	88	(Poland) Robert Kubica	Williams-Mercedes	77	+1 lap	20	
19	99	(Italy) Antonio Giovinazzi	Alfa Romeo Racing-Ferrari	76	+2 laps	18	
Ret	16	(Monaco) Charles Leclerc	Ferrari	16	Accident damage	15	
Fastest lap: (France) Pierre Gasly (Red Bull Racing-Honda) – 1:14.279 (lap 72)

Notes

- ^1 – Max Verstappen finished second, but received a 5-second penalty for an unsafe pit-stop release.
- ^2 – Includes one point for the fastest lap.
- ^3 – Romain Grosjean finished 9th, but received a 5-second penalty for crossing the pit exit line.
- ^4 – Kevin Magnussen finished 12th, but received a 5-second penalty for leaving the track and gaining an advantage.
- ^5 – Lance Stroll received a 5-second penalty for leaving the track and gaining an advantage.

== Championship standings after the race ==
Drivers' Championship standings

	Pos.	Driver	Points
	1	(United Kingdom) Lewis Hamilton	137
	2	(Finland) Valtteri Bottas	120
1	3	(Germany) Sebastian Vettel	82
1	4	(Netherlands) Max Verstappen	78
	5	(Monaco) Charles Leclerc	57

Constructors' Championship standings

Pos.	Constructor	Points
1	(Germany) Mercedes	257
2	(Italy) Ferrari	139
3	(Austria) Red Bull Racing-Honda	110
4	(United Kingdom) McLaren-Renault	30
5	(United Kingdom) Racing Point-BWT Mercedes	17

- Note: Only the top five positions are included for both sets of standings.

== See also ==
- 2019 Monte Carlo Formula 2 round

Previous race: 2019 Spanish Grand Prix	FIA Formula One World Championship; 2019 season	Next race: 2019 Canadian Grand Prix
Previous race: 2018 Monaco Grand Prix	Monaco Grand Prix	Next race: 2021 Monaco Grand Prix
