= AlphaTauri (fashion brand) =

Fashion brand of Red Bull GmbH

- Product type: Clothing
- Current owner: AlphaTauri GmbH
- Introduced: 2016
- Markets: Worldwide
- Tagline: "Fits body and mind."
- Website: alphatauri.com

AlphaTauri is a fashion brand founded in 2016 as a brand extension of Red Bull into the fashion industry. The brand is named after the Alpha Tauri star, and pays tribute to the founding company, Red Bull. Its headquarters are located in Salzburg, Austria.

== Background ==
AlphaTauri launched its first campaign for the Autumn/Winter 2018 season. The collection in 2018 included parkas, coats, shirts, sweaters, T-shirts, caps, belts and bags. In 2019, the brand introduced a pop-up store built into a truck that can be set up within 20 minutes, around 60 square meters in size.

In 2020, AlphaTauri launched a capsule collection of heatable clothes developed with Schoeller Textil and Telekom.

Since its launch, the brand has participated in various international fashion fairs such as FashionTech as well as the bi-annual Berlin Fashion Week, where the brand showcased its use of 3D technology in clothing design, through 3D Knit lab from Japanese company Shima Seiki.

The brand officially entered the US market during New York Fashion Week at Lincoln Center in February 2023, presenting its Autumn/Winter collection alongside the unveiling of the 2023 Scuderia AlphaTauri Formula One car. This event was AlphaTauri's first major US showcase, followed by the launch of its collections for American consumers in July 2023.

== Activities ==
AlphaTauri develops and patents its own textile technologies, such as Taurex, developed in collaboration with the Swiss company Schoeller Textil AG, specializing in the development and production of innovative fabrics and textile technologies.

As of 2022, the brand has three flagship stores in Graz, Vienna, and Salzburg. Alpha Tauri also opened its first international flagship store outside Austria in London's Knightsbridge district in 2022.

== Formula One ==
=== Scuderia AlphaTauri ===
Red Bull Racing (RBR) junior team Scuderia Toro Rosso was rebranded to Scuderia AlphaTauri in 2020 to promote the brand. On top of the rebranding, the team was promoted to the sister team to RBR. Pierre Gasly won the 2020 Italian Grand Prix while driving for the team.

In 2024, the team was rebranded to Racing Bulls.

=== Sponsorship ===
AlphaTauri signed a two-year deal with Formula One to become the official premium fashion apparel supplier starting from 2022. The brand became the FIA's first clothing partner in 2024 on a three-year contract.
