= Steven Petrik =

American engineer

- Citizenship: American
- Education: Virginia Tech, Oxford Brookes University
- Occupation: Engineer
- Employer: Audi Revolut F1 Team
- Title: Race engineer

Steven Petrik is an American Formula One engineer. He is currently the Race Engineer to Nico Hülkenberg at the Audi Revolut F1 Team.

== Career ==
Petrik studied mechanical engineering at Virginia Tech before completing a master's degree in Racing Engine Design at Oxford Brookes University. He joined Scuderia Ferrari through its graduate engineering programme in 2015. After completing the Ferrari F1 Engineering Academy, Petrik moved into a trackside performance engineering role in 2016. He worked as performance engineer to Sebastian Vettel from 2019 to 2020, contributing to car set-up development, simulator correlation and race-event performance analysis. He later partnered Carlos Sainz from 2021 to 2023, supporting the Spaniard's integration into the team.

In early 2024 Petrik joined the Sauber F1 Team, initially as a Senior Performance Engineer before being promoted to Race Engineer from the 2024 Miami Grand Prix, working with Valtteri Bottas and taking responsibility for car performance, race execution and pit wall operations. For the 2025 season he was assigned as Race Engineer to Nico Hülkenberg, guiding the German to his first podium at the 2025 British Grand Prix. He remained with Hülkenberg as the Hinwil organisation transitioned into the Audi F1 Team works programme from 2026, continuing to lead trackside engineering activities as part of Audi's entry into Formula One competition.
