= 2025 Belgian Grand Prix =

Formula One motor race

Race 13 of 24 in the 2025 Formula One World Championship
← Previous race	Next race →
- Layout of the Circuit de Spa-Francorchamps

Race details
- Date: 27 July 2025
- Official name: Formula 1 Moët & Chandon Belgian Grand Prix 2025
- Location: Circuit de Spa-Francorchamps; Stavelot, Belgium
- Course: Permanent racing facility
- Course length: 7.004 km (4.352 miles)
- Distance: 44 laps, 308.052 km (191.415 miles)
- Weather: Partly cloudy with humid track
- Attendance: 389,000

Pole position
Driver	(United Kingdom) Lando Norris	McLaren-Mercedes
- Time: 1:40.562

Fastest lap
Driver	(Italy) Kimi Antonelli	Mercedes
- Time: 1:44.861 on lap 32

Podium
First	(Australia) Oscar Piastri	McLaren-Mercedes
Second	(United Kingdom) Lando Norris	McLaren-Mercedes
Third	(Monaco) Charles Leclerc	Ferrari

The 2025 Belgian Grand Prix (officially known as the Formula 1 Moët & Chandon Belgian Grand Prix 2025) was a Formula One motor race that took place on 27 July 2025 at the Circuit de Spa-Francorchamps in Stavelot, Belgium. It was the thirteenth round of the 2025 Formula One World Championship and the third of six Grands Prix in the season to utilise the sprint format.

Oscar Piastri of McLaren took pole position for the sprint, but lost out to Max Verstappen of Red Bull Racing for the victory. Piastri's teammate Lando Norris took pole position for the main race. During the race itself, which was delayed following heavy rain, Piastri overtook his teammate and held the lead to win the Grand Prix. This was the first win of the Belgian Grand Prix for a McLaren driver since Jenson Button won the race in 2012.

The top five remained unchanged for both the Drivers' and Constructors' Championships, as Piastri extended his lead to 16 points over Norris, with Verstappen a further 65 points behind in third. McLaren scored a total of 516 points, more than twice as much as second-placed Ferrari (248 points), extending their lead to 268 points. Third-placed Mercedes were 28 points behind Ferrari, with Red Bull trailing Mercedes by the same deficit in fourth.

== Background ==
The event was held at the Circuit de Spa-Francorchamps in Stavelot for the 58th time in the circuit's history, across the weekend of 25–27 July. The Grand Prix was the thirteenth round of the 2025 Formula One World Championship and the 70th running of the Belgian Grand Prix as a round of the Formula One World Championship. It was also the third of six Grands Prix in the season to utilise the sprint format and the second time overall that the Belgian Grand Prix featured it.

=== Championship standings before the race ===
Going into the weekend, Oscar Piastri led the Drivers' Championship with 234 points, eight points ahead of his teammate Lando Norris in second, and 69 ahead of Max Verstappen in third. McLaren, with 460 points, led the Constructors' Championship from Ferrari and Mercedes, who were second and third with 222 and 210 points, respectively.

=== Entrants ===
The drivers and teams were the same as published in the season entry list with two exceptions; Yuki Tsunoda at Red Bull Racing was in the seat originally held by Liam Lawson before the latter was demoted back to Racing Bulls from the Japanese Grand Prix onward, and Franco Colapinto replaced Jack Doohan at Alpine from the Emilia Romagna Grand Prix onward until at least the Austrian Grand Prix on a rotating seat basis. Before the race at Spielberg, it was confirmed that Colapinto would retain his seat with the team, effectively on a race-by-race basis.

The Grand Prix marked the first race without Christian Horner as team principal of Red Bull Racing as he was sacked three days after the preceding British Grand Prix. He was replaced by Laurent Mekies, who left his role as team principal of Racing Bulls from this Grand Prix onward; his position at Racing Bulls was filled by Alan Permane.

=== Tyre choices ===
Tyre supplier Pirelli brought the C1, C3, and C4 tyre compounds (designated hard, medium, and soft, respectively) for teams to use at the event.

== Practice ==
The sole free practice session was held on 25 July 2025, at 12:30 local time (UTC+2), and was topped by Oscar Piastri of McLaren ahead of Max Verstappen of Red Bull Racing and Piastri's teammate Lando Norris.

== Sprint qualifying ==
Sprint qualifying was held on 25 July 2025, at 16:30 local time (UTC+2), and determined the starting grid order for the sprint.

=== Sprint qualifying classification ===
Pos.	No.	Driver	Constructor	Qualifying times			Final grid
Pos.	No.	Driver	Constructor	SQ1	SQ2	SQ3	Final grid
1	81	(Australia) Oscar Piastri	McLaren-Mercedes	1:41.769	1:42.128	1:40.510	1
2	1	(Netherlands) Max Verstappen	Red Bull Racing-Honda RBPT	1:42.043	1:41.583	1:40.987	2
3	4	(United Kingdom) Lando Norris	McLaren-Mercedes	1:42.068	1:41.412	1:41.128	3
4	16	(Monaco) Charles Leclerc	Ferrari	1:42.763	1:41.786	1:41.278	4
5	31	(France) Esteban Ocon	Haas-Ferrari	1:42.822	1:41.801	1:41.565	5
6	55	(Spain) Carlos Sainz Jr.	Williams-Mercedes	1:42.776	1:42.051	1:41.761	6
7	87	(United Kingdom) Oliver Bearman	Haas-Ferrari	1:43.024	1:42.019	1:41.857	7
8	10	(France) Pierre Gasly	Alpine-Renault	1:43.171	1:41.949	1:41.959	8
9	6	(France) Isack Hadjar	Racing Bulls-Honda RBPT	1:42.711	1:42.088	1:41.971	9
10	5	(Brazil) Gabriel Bortoleto	Kick Sauber-Ferrari	1:42.806	1:41.901	1:42.176	10
11	30	(New Zealand) Liam Lawson	Racing Bulls-Honda RBPT	1:42.897	1:42.169	N/A	11
12	22	(Japan) Yuki Tsunoda	Red Bull Racing-Honda RBPT	1:42.912	1:42.184	N/A	12
13	63	(United Kingdom) George Russell	Mercedes	1:42.650	1:42.330	N/A	13
14	14	(Spain) Fernando Alonso	Aston Martin Aramco-Mercedes	1:42.427	1:42.453	N/A	14
15	18	(Canada) Lance Stroll	Aston Martin Aramco-Mercedes	1:42.736	1:42.832	N/A	15
16	23	(Thailand) Alexander Albon	Williams-Mercedes	1:43.212	N/A	N/A	16
17	27	(Germany) Nico Hülkenberg	Kick Sauber-Ferrari	1:43.217	N/A	N/A	17
18	44	(United Kingdom) Lewis Hamilton	Ferrari	1:43.408	N/A	N/A	18
19	43	(Argentina) Franco Colapinto	Alpine-Renault	1:43.587	N/A	N/A	PL^{1}
20	12	(Italy) Kimi Antonelli	Mercedes	1:45.394	N/A	N/A	19
107% time: 1:48.892

Notes

- ^1 – Franco Colapinto qualified 19th, but was required to start the sprint from the pit lane as his car was modified under parc fermé conditions.

== Sprint ==
The sprint was held on 26 July 2025, at 12:00 local time (UTC+2), and was run for 15 laps.

=== Sprint report ===
Pole-sitter Oscar Piastri of McLaren initially led off the start, however was unable to prevent second-starting Max Verstappen of Red Bull Racing from using his slipstream to pull alongside the McLaren at Kemmel Straight before overtaking around the outside of Les Combes on lap 1. Whilst Piastri was able to remain within a second of Verstappen for the rest of the 15-lap sprint, he was unable to launch a serious challenge to retake the lead, with his closest attempt coming on lap 11 after Verstappen had run slightly wide through the Bus stop chicane at the end of the previous lap. Therefore, despite his team's pace disadvantage, Verstappen was able to win his first sprint of the season and take his twelfth sprint victory overall. Piastri's teammate, third-starting Lando Norris, was briefly passed on the opening lap Charles Leclerc of Ferrari in a similar fashion to how Piastri was passed by Verstappen, however Norris was able to retake the position along the Kemmel Straight on lap 4. Pierre Gasly of Alpine, who had been due to start seventh, withdrew before the formation lap due to a water system leak, and ultimately started the race two laps behind before completing 12 laps in total.

The sprint was not particularly eventful, with only four changes of position occurring after the first lap; Norris's overtake on Leclerc being the only one of these that occurred in points-paying positions.

=== Sprint classification ===
Pos.	No.	Driver	Constructor	Laps	Time/Retired	Grid	Points
1	1	(Netherlands) Max Verstappen	Red Bull Racing-Honda RBPT	15	26:37.997	2	8
2	81	(Australia) Oscar Piastri	McLaren-Mercedes	15	+0.753	1	7
3	4	(United Kingdom) Lando Norris	McLaren-Mercedes	15	+1.414	3	6
4	16	(Monaco) Charles Leclerc	Ferrari	15	+10.176	4	5
5	31	(France) Esteban Ocon	Haas-Ferrari	15	+13.789	5	4
6	55	(Spain) Carlos Sainz Jr.	Williams-Mercedes	15	+14.964	6	3
7	87	(United Kingdom) Oliver Bearman	Haas-Ferrari	15	+18.610	7	2
8	6	(France) Isack Hadjar	Racing Bulls-Honda RBPT	15	+19.119	9	1
9	5	(Brazil) Gabriel Bortoleto	Kick Sauber-Ferrari	15	+22.183	10	
10	30	(New Zealand) Liam Lawson	Racing Bulls-Honda RBPT	15	+22.897	11	
11	22	(Japan) Yuki Tsunoda	Red Bull Racing-Honda RBPT	15	+24.551	12	
12	63	(United Kingdom) George Russell	Mercedes	15	+25.969	13	
13	18	(Canada) Lance Stroll	Aston Martin Aramco-Mercedes	15	+26.595	15	
14	14	(Spain) Fernando Alonso	Aston Martin Aramco-Mercedes	15	+29.046	14	
15	44	(United Kingdom) Lewis Hamilton	Ferrari	15	+30.175	18	
16	23	(Thailand) Alexander Albon	Williams-Mercedes	15	+30.941	16	
17	12	(Italy) Kimi Antonelli	Mercedes	15	+31.981	19	
18	27	(Germany) Nico Hülkenberg	Kick Sauber-Ferrari	15	+32.867	17	
19	43	(Argentina) Franco Colapinto	Alpine-Renault	15	+38.072	PL	
Ret	10	(France) Pierre Gasly	Alpine-Renault	12	Water leak	PL^{1}	

Notes

- ^1 – Pierre Gasly qualified 8th, but was pushed from the starting grid into his garage before the start of the race. He subsequently started from the pit lane.

== Qualifying ==
Qualifying was held on 26 July 2025, at 16:00 local time (UTC+2), and determined the starting grid order for the main race.

=== Qualifying classification ===
Pos.	No.	Driver	Constructor	Qualifying times			Final grid
Pos.	No.	Driver	Constructor	Q1	Q2	Q3	Final grid
1	4	(United Kingdom) Lando Norris	McLaren-Mercedes	1:41.010	1:40.715	1:40.562	1
2	81	(Australia) Oscar Piastri	McLaren-Mercedes	1:41.201	1:40.626	1:40.647	2
3	16	(Monaco) Charles Leclerc	Ferrari	1:41.635	1:41.084	1:40.900	3
4	1	(Netherlands) Max Verstappen	Red Bull Racing-Honda RBPT	1:41.334	1:40.951	1:40.903	4
5	23	(Thailand) Alexander Albon	Williams-Mercedes	1:41.772	1:41.505	1:41.201	5
6	63	(United Kingdom) George Russell	Mercedes	1:41.784	1:41.254	1:41.260	6
7	22	(Japan) Yuki Tsunoda	Red Bull Racing-Honda RBPT	1:41.840	1:41.245	1:41.284	7
8	6	(France) Isack Hadjar	Racing Bulls-Honda RBPT	1:41.572	1:41.281	1:41.310	8
9	30	(New Zealand) Liam Lawson	Racing Bulls-Honda RBPT	1:41.748	1:41.297	1:41.328	9
10	5	(Brazil) Gabriel Bortoleto	Kick Sauber-Ferrari	1:41.908	1:41.336	1:42.387	10
11	31	(France) Esteban Ocon	Haas-Ferrari	1:41.884	1:41.525	N/A	11
12	87	(United Kingdom) Oliver Bearman	Haas-Ferrari	1:41.617	1:41.617	N/A	12
13	10	(France) Pierre Gasly	Alpine-Renault	1:41.800	1:41.633	N/A	13
14	27	(Germany) Nico Hülkenberg	Kick Sauber-Ferrari	1:41.844	1:41.707	N/A	14
15	55	(Spain) Carlos Sainz Jr.	Williams-Mercedes	1:41.691	1:41.758	N/A	PL^{1}
16	44	(United Kingdom) Lewis Hamilton	Ferrari	1:41.939	N/A	N/A	PL^{2}
17	43	(Argentina) Franco Colapinto	Alpine-Renault	1:42.022	N/A	N/A	15
18	12	(Italy) Kimi Antonelli	Mercedes	1:42.139	N/A	N/A	PL^{2}
19	14	(Spain) Fernando Alonso	Aston Martin Aramco-Mercedes	1:42.385	N/A	N/A	PL^{2}
20	18	(Canada) Lance Stroll	Aston Martin Aramco-Mercedes	1:42.502	N/A	N/A	16
107% time: 1:48.080

Notes

- ^1 – Carlos Sainz Jr. qualified 15th, but was required to start the race from the pit lane as his car was modified under parc fermé conditions.
- ^2 – Lewis Hamilton, Kimi Antonelli and Fernando Alonso qualified 16th, 18th and 19th, respectively, but were required to start the race from the pit lane for exceeding their quota of power unit elements and replacing them under parc fermé conditions.

== Race ==
The race was held on 27 July 2025, and was scheduled to start at 15:00 local time (UTC+2). However, the initial attempt to start the race with the formation lap was suspended due to poor weather conditions, with the official start ultimately delayed to 16:20. The race was run for 44 laps.

=== Race report ===
Following the rain delay, the race began in intermediate conditions with the drivers being led behind the safety car. The safety car came in at the end of lap 4 for a rolling start, with polesitter Lando Norris of McLaren leading the field across the line. However, Norris would not hold the lead for long, as his teammate Oscar Piastri was able to utilise Norris's slipstream along the Kemmel Straight and then pass him under braking for Les Combes – ironically, in a similar way to how Piastri had been passed by Max Verstappen of Red Bull during the previous day's sprint. On lap 6, George Russell of Mercedes passed Alexander Albon of Williams along the Kemmel Straight to take fifth position. Drivers quickly began to struggle on the drying track, with third-placed Charles Leclerc of Ferrari running wide at La Source on lap 11 and only narrowly holding his position ahead of the chasing Verstappen. At the end of lap 11 Leclerc's teammate Lewis Hamilton, who was in 13th position after making steady progress from a starting position of 18th, became the first driver to pit for dry tyres, taking a set of the medium compound.

With Hamilton quickly getting up to speed on dry tyres, the race leaders had no choice but to respond. Therefore, at the end of lap 12, Piastri, Leclerc, Verstappen and Russell led a rush of cars into the pits, with all drivers taking the medium tyre. Indeed, only Norris, Verstappen's teammate Yuki Tsunoda, Isack Hadjar of Racing Bulls, and Esteban Ocon of Haas remained on the intermediate tyres, as they would have been unable to pit without having to wait in the pit lane for their respective teammates to be serviced. These yet-to-pit drivers were losing seconds of time however, to the point where Ocon was caught by the Leclerc, Verstappen, Russell and Albon group as they entered the second half of the lap. Norris pitted at the end of the lap for hard tyres, re-joining still in second place but with a gap to Piastri of around seven seconds, compared to around two seconds before the pit stops. By pitting early, Hamilton had gained six places and moved into seventh position. Nico Hülkenberg of Sauber and Pierre Gasly of Alpine, both of whom had pitted on the same lap as Hamilton, also gained positions, with Hülkenberg going from 15th to 9th and Gasly from 14th to 11th. On the other hand, Tsunoda and Hadjar both dropped out of the top ten as a result of being among the last drivers to switch to dry tyres. On lap 20 Hülkenberg swapped positions with his teammate Gabriel Bortoleto, who had been ahead before the pitstops.

Whilst Piastri now held a comfortable lead over Norris, he was in a difficult position as, whilst Norris would be easily able to reach the end of the race on hard tyres, it was uncertain if that would be possible on Piastri's medium compound. As Piastri focused on tyre management, Norris was able to start closing the gap, however some of this work was undone when Norris ran wide at Pouhon on lap 26, costing himself about a second to Piastri. On lap 32, Hülkenberg pitted for a second set of medium tyres, however it soon became clear that this strategy would not be followed by any of the other top ten drivers, as teams realised that making the tyres last to the end would lose less time than making a second pitstop. As the chequered flag drew nearer Norris began making greater gains on Piastri, to the point where the gap had closed to three seconds as the pair began the penultimate lap, lap 43. Moments later, however, Norris would suffer a lock-up at La Source and lose another second to Piastri, ending any realistic chance at a pass. Piastri would therefore take his first Belgian Grand Prix victory, and the eighth win of his career. This was McLaren's first win in Belgium since 2012, when Jenson Button won the race, and their first 1–2 finish at the circuit since 1999. This was also McLaren's sixth 1–2 of the season, making it the most they had achieved in one season since Ayrton Senna and Alain Prost achieved ten in 1988.

=== Race classification ===
Pos.	No.	Driver	Constructor	Laps	Time/Retired	Grid	Points
1	81	(Australia) Oscar Piastri	McLaren-Mercedes	44	1:25:22.601	2	25
2	4	(United Kingdom) Lando Norris	McLaren-Mercedes	44	+3.415	1	18
3	16	(Monaco) Charles Leclerc	Ferrari	44	+20.185	3	15
4	1	(Netherlands) Max Verstappen	Red Bull Racing-Honda RBPT	44	+21.731	4	12
5	63	(United Kingdom) George Russell	Mercedes	44	+34.863	6	10
6	23	(Thailand) Alexander Albon	Williams-Mercedes	44	+39.926	5	8
7	44	(United Kingdom) Lewis Hamilton	Ferrari	44	+40.679	PL	6
8	30	(New Zealand) Liam Lawson	Racing Bulls-Honda RBPT	44	+52.033	9	4
9	5	(Brazil) Gabriel Bortoleto	Kick Sauber-Ferrari	44	+56.434	10	2
10	10	(France) Pierre Gasly	Alpine-Renault	44	+1:12.714	13	1
11	87	(United Kingdom) Oliver Bearman	Haas-Ferrari	44	+1:13.145	12	
12	27	(Germany) Nico Hülkenberg	Kick Sauber-Ferrari	44	+1:13.628	14	
13	22	(Japan) Yuki Tsunoda	Red Bull Racing-Honda RBPT	44	+1:15.395	7	
14	18	(Canada) Lance Stroll	Aston Martin Aramco-Mercedes	44	+1:19.831	16	
15	31	(France) Esteban Ocon	Haas-Ferrari	44	+1:26.063	11	
16	12	(Italy) Kimi Antonelli	Mercedes	44	+1:26.721	PL	
17	14	(Spain) Fernando Alonso	Aston Martin Aramco-Mercedes	44	+1:27.924	PL	
18	55	(Spain) Carlos Sainz Jr.	Williams-Mercedes	44	+1:32.024	PL	
19	43	(Argentina) Franco Colapinto	Alpine-Renault	44	+1:35.520	15	
20	6	(France) Isack Hadjar	Racing Bulls-Honda RBPT	43	+1 lap	8	

== Championship standings after the race ==
Drivers' Championship standings

Pos.	Driver	Points
1	(Australia) Oscar Piastri	266
2	(United Kingdom) Lando Norris	250
3	(Netherlands) Max Verstappen	185
4	(United Kingdom) George Russell	157
5	(Monaco) Charles Leclerc	139

Constructors' Championship standings

Pos.	Constructor	Points
1	(United Kingdom) McLaren-Mercedes	516
2	(Italy) Ferrari	248
3	(Germany) Mercedes	220
4	(Austria) Red Bull Racing-Honda RBPT	192
5	(United Kingdom) Williams-Mercedes	70

- Note: Only the top five positions are included for both sets of standings.

== See also ==
- 2025 Spa-Francorchamps Formula 2 round
- 2025 Spa-Francorchamps Formula 3 round

Previous race: 2025 British Grand Prix	FIA Formula One World Championship; 2025 season	Next race: 2025 Hungarian Grand Prix
Previous race: 2024 Belgian Grand Prix	Belgian Grand Prix	Next race: 2026 Belgian Grand Prix
