= Peter Bayer =

Austrian motorsports executive

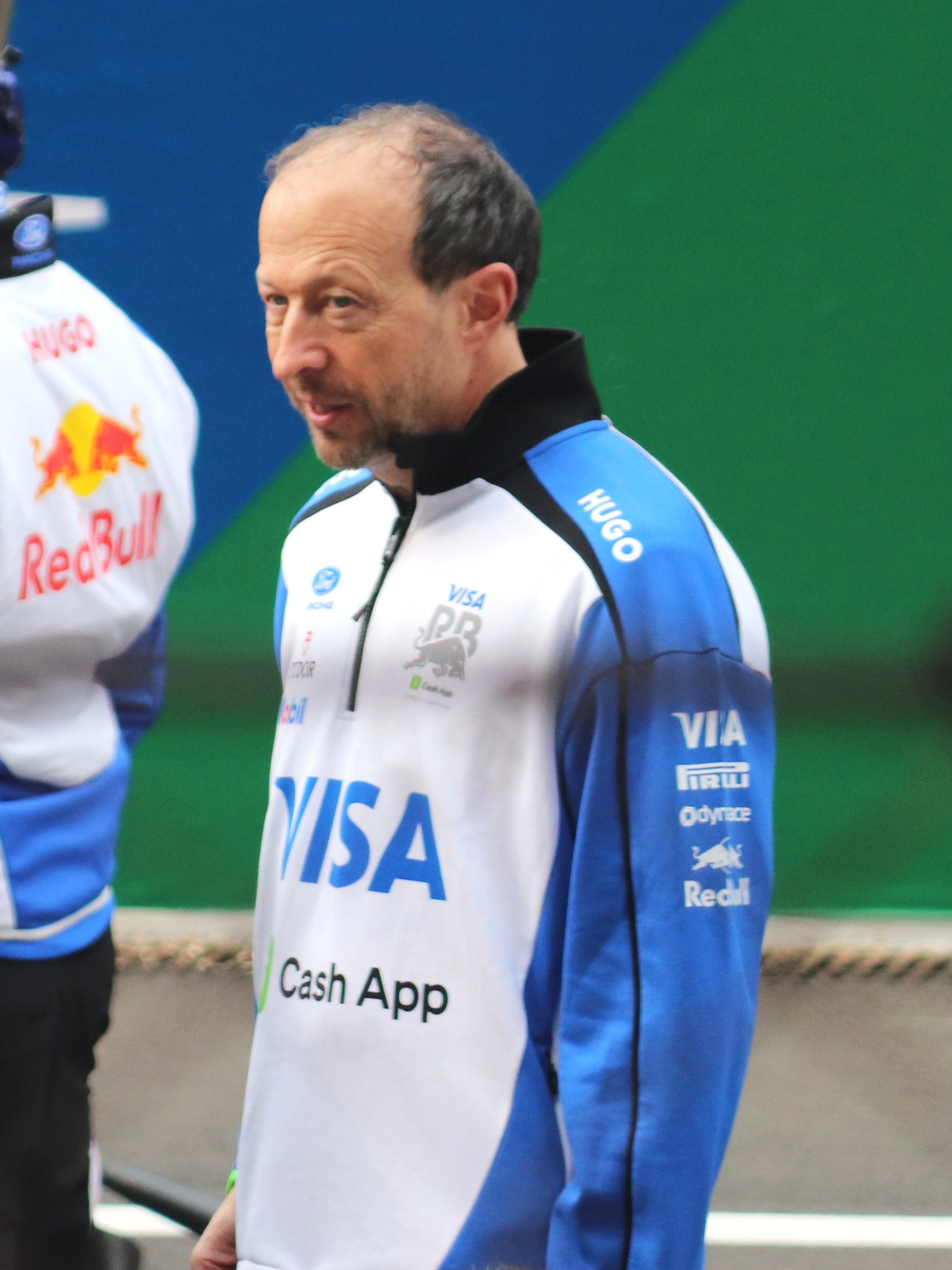
- Peter Bayer in 2026
- Born: Peter Anton Bayer; 6 April 1971 (age 55)
- Occupation: Chief executive officer
- Title: Racing Bulls CEO

Peter Anton Bayer (born 6 April 1971) is an Austrian Formula One motorsports executive. He is chief executive officer (CEO) at Racing Bulls Formula One team.

== Career ==
Bayer began his professional life in winter sports, joining the International Snowboard Federation before founding VIA3 Communications in 2002, a consultancy focused on youth engagement in sport and culture. He later worked with the International Olympic Committee, as CEO of the inaugural Winter Youth Olympic Games in Innsbruck in 2012, and was awarded the Olympic Order the following year.

He subsequently managed commercial activities in sailing for the IMOCA Globe Series, before being appointed FIA Secretary General for Sport in 2017 under then-president Jean Todt. During his tenure, Bayer was also executive director of the Formula One World Championship, leading negotiations for the Concorde Agreement, developing the 2026 Power Unit Regulations, and overseeing the introduction of the F1 Cost Cap.

After leaving the FIA in 2022, Bayer advised Audi on its Formula One entry plans before joining Red Bull GmbH in 2023 as CEO of the Scuderia AlphaTauri team which was later renamed Racing Bulls. He leads the team alongside team principal Alan Permane; being responsible for the commercial aspects of the team.
