= 2025 Hungarian Grand Prix =

Formula One motor race

Race 14 of 24 in the 2025 Formula One World Championship
← Previous race	Next race →
- Layout of the Hungaroring

Race details
- Date: 3 August 2025
- Official name: Formula 1 Lenovo Hungarian Grand Prix 2025
- Location: Hungaroring; Mogyoród, Hungary
- Course: Permanent racing facility
- Course length: 4.381 km (2.722 miles)
- Distance: 70 laps, 306.630 km (190.531 miles)
- Weather: Cloudy
- Attendance: 300,000

Pole position
Driver	(Monaco) Charles Leclerc	Ferrari
- Time: 1:15.372

Fastest lap
Driver	(United Kingdom) George Russell	Mercedes
- Time: 1:19.409 on lap 45

Podium
First	(United Kingdom) Lando Norris	McLaren-Mercedes
Second	(Australia) Oscar Piastri	McLaren-Mercedes
Third	(United Kingdom) George Russell	Mercedes

The 2025 Hungarian Grand Prix (officially known as the Formula 1 Lenovo Hungarian Grand Prix 2025) was a Formula One motor race that took place on 3 August 2025 at the Hungaroring in Mogyoród, Hungary. It was the fourteenth round of the 2025 Formula One World Championship. Charles Leclerc took pole position for the race in the Ferrari, but lost out to Lando Norris, who won the race to give McLaren their 200th Formula One victory. Norris's teammate Oscar Piastri and George Russell of Mercedes rounded out the podium.

The top five remained unchanged for both the Drivers' and Constructors' Championship, with Norris reducing the gap to nine points over Piastri following his fifth win of the season. Max Verstappen remained in third with 187 points, but only 15 points ahead of Russell, with Leclerc a further 21 points behind. McLaren extended their lead to 299 points over Ferrari in second, with Mercedes a further 24 points behind in third.

== Background ==
The event was held at the Hungaroring in Mogyoród for the 40th time in the circuit's history, across the weekend of 1–3 August. The Grand Prix was the fourteenth round of the 2025 Formula One World Championship and the 40th running of the Hungarian Grand Prix as part of the Formula One World Championship.

=== Championship standings before the race ===
Going into the weekend, Oscar Piastri led the Drivers' Championship with 266 points, 16 points ahead of teammate Lando Norris in second and 65 ahead of Max Verstappen in third. McLaren, with 516 points, led the Constructors' Championship from Ferrari and Mercedes, who were second and third with 248 and 220 points, respectively.

=== Entrants ===
The drivers and teams were the same as published in the season entry list with two exceptions; Yuki Tsunoda at Red Bull Racing was in the seat originally held by Liam Lawson before the latter was demoted back to Racing Bulls from the Japanese Grand Prix onward, and Franco Colapinto replaced Jack Doohan at Alpine from the Emilia Romagna Grand Prix onward until at least the Austrian Grand Prix on a rotating seat basis. Before the race at Spielberg, it was confirmed that Colapinto would retain his seat with the team, effectively on a race-by-race basis.

During the first free practice session, Sauber fielded Paul Aron in place of Nico Hülkenberg. Aron had not raced in more than two Grands Prix, as required by the Formula One regulations. Fernando Alonso (Aston Martin) elected to sit out the session due to a muscular injury in his back, and was replaced by Felipe Drugovich.

=== Tyre choices ===
Tyre supplier Pirelli brought the C3, C4, and C5 tyre compounds (designated hard, medium, and soft, respectively) for teams to use at the event.

== Practice ==
Three free practice sessions were held for the event. The first free practice session was held on 1 August 2025, at 13:30 local time (UTC+2), and the second on the same day, at 17:00 local time; both sessions were topped by Lando Norris ahead of his McLaren teammate Oscar Piastri and Ferrari's Charles Leclerc. The third free practice was held on 2 August 2025, at 12:30 local time, and was topped by the same three drivers: Piastri, Norris, and Leclerc.

== Qualifying ==
Qualifying was held on 2 August 2025, at 16:00 local time (UTC+2), and determined the starting grid order for the race.

=== Qualifying report ===
There were variable conditions on track, with the wind and temperature changes affecting the three sessions. Yuki Tsunoda, Pierre Gasly, Esteban Ocon, Nico Hulkenberg, and Alexander Albon were eliminated from Q1 (the opening session of three for qualifying). There was some spots of rain observed during Q2. Kimi Antonelli exceeded track limits and had multiple lap times deleted. Oliver Bearman, Lewis Hamilton, Carlos Sainz Jr., Franco Colapinto, and Antonelli were eliminated from Q2. The weather continued to fluctuate in Q3, with the wind conditions changing and the temperature cooling compared to the start of Q1.

Charles Leclerc took his 27th career pole position and Ferrari's only pole of the season, 0.026 seconds ahead of Oscar Piastri.

=== Qualifying classification ===
Pos.	No.	Driver	Constructor	Qualifying times			Final grid
Pos.	No.	Driver	Constructor	Q1	Q2	Q3	Final grid
1	16	(Monaco) Charles Leclerc	Ferrari	1:15.582	1:15.455	1:15.372	1
2	81	(Australia) Oscar Piastri	McLaren-Mercedes	1:15.211	1:14.941	1:15.398	2
3	4	(United Kingdom) Lando Norris	McLaren-Mercedes	1:15.523	1:14.890	1:15.413	3
4	63	(United Kingdom) George Russell	Mercedes	1:15.627	1:15.201	1:15.425	4
5	14	(Spain) Fernando Alonso	Aston Martin Aramco-Mercedes	1:15.281	1:15.395	1:15.481	5
6	18	(Canada) Lance Stroll	Aston Martin Aramco-Mercedes	1:15.673	1:15.129	1:15.498	6
7	5	(Brazil) Gabriel Bortoleto	Kick Sauber-Ferrari	1:15.586	1:15.687	1:15.725	7
8	1	(Netherlands) Max Verstappen	Red Bull Racing-Honda RBPT	1:15.736	1:15.547	1:15.728	8
9	30	(New Zealand) Liam Lawson	Racing Bulls-Honda RBPT	1:15.849	1:15.630	1:15.821	9
10	6	(France) Isack Hadjar	Racing Bulls-Honda RBPT	1:15.516	1:15.469	1:15.915	10
11	87	(United Kingdom) Oliver Bearman	Haas-Ferrari	1:15.750	1:15.694	N/A	11
12	44	(United Kingdom) Lewis Hamilton	Ferrari	1:15.733	1:15.702	N/A	12
13	55	(Spain) Carlos Sainz Jr.	Williams-Mercedes	1:15.652	1:15.781	N/A	13
14	43	(Argentina) Franco Colapinto	Alpine-Renault	1:15.875	1:16.159	N/A	14
15	12	(Italy) Kimi Antonelli	Mercedes	1:15.782	1:16.386	N/A	15
16	22	(Japan) Yuki Tsunoda	Red Bull Racing-Honda RBPT	1:15.899	N/A	N/A	PL^{1}
17	10	(France) Pierre Gasly	Alpine-Renault	1:15.966	N/A	N/A	16
18	31	(France) Esteban Ocon	Haas-Ferrari	1:16.023	N/A	N/A	17
19	27	(Germany) Nico Hülkenberg	Kick Sauber-Ferrari	1:16.081	N/A	N/A	18
20	23	(Thailand) Alexander Albon	Williams-Mercedes	1:16.223	N/A	N/A	19
107% time: 1:20.475

Notes

- ^1 – Yuki Tsunoda qualified 16th, but was required to start the race from the pit lane for exceeding his quota of power unit elements and replacing them under parc fermé conditions.

== Race ==
The race was held on 3 August 2025, at 15:00 local time (UTC+2), and was run for 70 laps.

=== Race report ===
Charles Leclerc made a strong start from pole position in the Ferrari, and held his lead through the first corner. Oscar Piastri held second position in the McLaren. After a strong initial get away, Lando Norris took the inside line for turn 1, causing him to be passed around the outside by George Russell and Fernando Alonso. Alonso's Aston Martin teammate Lance Stroll, who started sixth, lost one position to rookie Gabriel Bortoleto. On lap 2, Max Verstappen passed Liam Lawson for eighth at the turn 6 chicane, reversing a switch of position that happened at the start. On lap 3, Norris repassed Alonso to take fourth at the start of the lap, with Verstappen passing Stroll for seventh shortly after at turn 6. On lap 17, Verstappen became the first leading driver to pit, re-joining in 16th place. Whilst Verstappen was hoping to utilise an undercut strategy, he struggled to make progress due to traffic from slower cars. On lap 18, Piastri pitted from second to take hard tyres, re-joining the race in fifth. Leclerc responded the following lap, pitting and re-joining a second ahead of Piastri; Russell also took his first pit stop this lap. This left Norris and Alonso leading the race, although the latter would quickly be passed by Leclerc and Piastri. Russell struggled more with passing Alonso, but eventually did so into turn 1 on lap 26.

On lap 29, Verstappen passed the yet-to-pit Lewis Hamilton in the Ferrari for 11th at turn 4, causing Hamilton to run off the track in the process; the incident was investigated by stewards following the race, who deemed that no further action needed to be taken. On lap 31, Norris finally pitted from the lead, re-joining in fourth place but with the ability to finish the race without making another stop. On lap 40, Leclerc made his second stop from the lead, taking hard tyres and re-joining seven seconds behind Norris in fourth. On lap 45, Piastri made his final stop, re-joining five seconds behind Leclerc and twelve seconds behind race leader Norris. Leclerc struggled to maintain pace, and on lap 51 was passed by Piastri around the outside of turn 1 for second; Piastri began closing on Norris, who was still nine seconds ahead but on tyres which were 14 laps older. On lap 62, Russell passed Leclerc for third at turn 1; Russell felt that Leclerc's defense was illegal, as he was moving under braking. Leclerc received a five-second time penalty for driving erratically after stewards reviewed the incident. As the race entered its final laps, Piastri closed to within DRS range of Norris. On the penultimate lap, Piastri lunged down the inside of Norris entering turn 1. Piastri locked up and was centimetres away from making contact with the back of Norris' car, but he could not pass. This failed attempt cost Piastri approximately half a second, and whilst he closed in on Norris as they began the final lap, he could not get close to an overtake again.

Norris crossed the finish line with a lead of under a second to Piastri, taking his first Grand Prix win in Hungary, his fifth win of the season, and the ninth win of his career. McLaren took their 200th Grand Prix win, making them the second team after Ferrari to achieve such a tally. This was also McLaren's fourth-consecutive 1–2 finish, something which had not been seen since Mercedes had a run of five at the start of the 2019 championship. Russell achieved his sixth podium of the season in third ahead of Leclerc, whilst Alonso finished fifth to take his and Aston Martin's best result since the 2024 Saudi Arabian Grand Prix. The team also scored their highest points tally in a race since the 2023 São Paulo Grand Prix. By finishing sixth, Bortoleto took the best result of his career to date, as well as extending Sauber's points-scoring run to six races. Lance Stroll, Liam Lawson, Max Verstappen, and Kimi Antonelli completed the top ten points finishers.

=== Race classification ===
Pos.	No.	Driver	Constructor	Laps	Time/Retired	Grid	Points
1	4	(United Kingdom) Lando Norris	McLaren-Mercedes	70	1:35:21.231	3	25
2	81	(Australia) Oscar Piastri	McLaren-Mercedes	70	+0.698	2	18
3	63	(United Kingdom) George Russell	Mercedes	70	+21.916	4	15
4	16	(Monaco) Charles Leclerc	Ferrari	70	+42.560^{1}	1	12
5	14	(Spain) Fernando Alonso	Aston Martin Aramco-Mercedes	70	+59.040	5	10
6	5	(Brazil) Gabriel Bortoleto	Kick Sauber-Ferrari	70	+1:06.169	7	8
7	18	(Canada) Lance Stroll	Aston Martin Aramco-Mercedes	70	+1:08.174	6	6
8	30	(New Zealand) Liam Lawson	Racing Bulls-Honda RBPT	70	+1:09.451	9	4
9	1	(Netherlands) Max Verstappen	Red Bull Racing-Honda RBPT	70	+1:12.645	8	2
10	12	(Italy) Kimi Antonelli	Mercedes	69	+1 lap	15	1
11	6	(France) Isack Hadjar	Racing Bulls-Honda RBPT	69	+1 lap	10	
12	44	(United Kingdom) Lewis Hamilton	Ferrari	69	+1 lap	12	
13	27	(Germany) Nico Hülkenberg	Kick Sauber-Ferrari	69	+1 lap	18	
14	55	(Spain) Carlos Sainz Jr.	Williams-Mercedes	69	+1 lap	13	
15	23	(Thailand) Alexander Albon	Williams-Mercedes	69	+1 lap	19	
16	31	(France) Esteban Ocon	Haas-Ferrari	69	+1 lap	17	
17	22	(Japan) Yuki Tsunoda	Red Bull Racing-Honda RBPT	69	+1 lap	PL	
18	43	(Argentina) Franco Colapinto	Alpine-Renault	69	+1 lap	14	
19	10	(France) Pierre Gasly	Alpine-Renault	69	+1 lap^{2}	16	
Ret	87	(United Kingdom) Oliver Bearman	Haas-Ferrari	48	Undertray	11	

Notes

- ^1 – Charles Leclerc received a five-second time penalty for driving erratically. His final position was not affected by the penalty.
- ^2 – Pierre Gasly finished 17th, but received a ten-second time penalty for causing a collision with Carlos Sainz Jr..

== Championship standings after the race ==
Drivers' Championship standings

Pos.	Driver	Points
1	(Australia) Oscar Piastri	284
2	(United Kingdom) Lando Norris	275
3	(Netherlands) Max Verstappen	187
4	(United Kingdom) George Russell	172
5	(Monaco) Charles Leclerc	151

Constructors' Championship standings

Pos.	Constructor	Points
1	(United Kingdom) McLaren-Mercedes	559
2	(Italy) Ferrari	260
3	(Germany) Mercedes	236
4	(Austria) Red Bull Racing-Honda RBPT	194
5	(United Kingdom) Williams-Mercedes	70

- Note: Only the top five positions are included for both sets of standings.

== See also ==
- 2025 Budapest Formula 2 round
- 2025 Budapest Formula 3 round

Previous race: 2025 Belgian Grand Prix	FIA Formula One World Championship; 2025 season	Next race: 2025 Dutch Grand Prix
Previous race: 2024 Hungarian Grand Prix	Hungarian Grand Prix	Next race: 2026 Hungarian Grand Prix
