= 2025 Dutch Grand Prix =

Formula One motor race

Race 15 of 24 in the 2025 Formula One World Championship
← Previous race	Next race →
- Layout of the Zandvoort circuit

Race details
- Date: 31 August 2025
- Official name: Formula 1 Heineken Dutch Grand Prix 2025
- Location: Circuit Zandvoort; Zandvoort, Netherlands
- Course: Permanent racing facility
- Course length: 4.259 km (2.646 miles)
- Distance: 72 laps, 306.587 km (190.504 miles)
- Weather: Cloudy
- Attendance: 305,000

Pole position
Driver	(Australia) Oscar Piastri	McLaren-Mercedes
- Time: 1:08.662

Fastest lap
Driver	(Australia) Oscar Piastri	McLaren-Mercedes
- Time: 1:12.271 on lap 60

Podium
First	(Australia) Oscar Piastri	McLaren-Mercedes
Second	(Netherlands) Max Verstappen	Red Bull Racing-Honda RBPT
Third	(France) Isack Hadjar	Racing Bulls-Honda RBPT

The 2025 Dutch Grand Prix (officially known as the Formula 1 Heineken Dutch Grand Prix 2025) was a Formula One motor race held on 31 August 2025 at the Circuit Zandvoort in Zandvoort, the Netherlands. It was the fifteenth round of the 2025 Formula One World Championship. Oscar Piastri of McLaren converted his pole position into a win, his first career grand chelem, ahead of Max Verstappen of Red Bull and Isack Hadjar of Racing Bulls, who scored his and Racing Bulls's maiden career podium after Piastri's teammate Lando Norris suffered an oil leak in the closing laps of the race. As of October 2026, this remains Piastri's most recent Grand Prix victory.

Piastri used Norris' retirement to extend his lead in the Drivers' Championship to 34 points over his teammate. Verstappen remained in third, 104 points behind Piastri. In the Constructors' Championship, McLaren extended their lead to 324 points over Ferrari with third-placed constructor Mercedes closing the gap to Ferrari to twelve points.

== Background ==
The event was held at Circuit Zandvoort in Zandvoort for the 35th time in the circuit's history, across the weekend of 29–31 August. The Grand Prix was the fifteenth round of the 2025 Formula One World Championship and the 35th running of the Dutch Grand Prix as a round of the Formula One World Championship.

=== Championship standings before the race ===
Going into the weekend, Oscar Piastri led the Drivers' Championship with 284 points, nine points ahead of teammate Lando Norris in second and 97 ahead of Max Verstappen in third. McLaren, with 559 points, led the Constructors' Championship from Ferrari and Mercedes, who were second and third with 260 and 236 points, respectively.

=== Entrants ===
The drivers and teams were the same as published in the season entry list with two exceptions; Yuki Tsunoda at Red Bull Racing was in the seat originally held by Liam Lawson before the latter was demoted back to Racing Bulls from the Japanese Grand Prix onward, and Franco Colapinto replaced Jack Doohan at Alpine from the Emilia Romagna Grand Prix onward until at least the Austrian Grand Prix on a rotating seat basis. Before the race at Spielberg, it was confirmed that Colapinto would retain his seat with the team, effectively on a race-by-race basis.

=== Tyre choices ===
Tyre supplier Pirelli brought the C2, C3, and C4 tyre compounds designated hard, medium, and soft, respectively, for teams to use at the event. The event marked Pirelli's 500th Grand Prix entry.

=== Circuit change ===
The pit lane speed limit was increased from 60 km/h (37 mph) to 80 km/h (50 mph).

== Practice ==
Three free practice sessions were held for the event. The first free practice session was held on 29 August 2025, at 12:30 local time (UTC+2), and was topped by Lando Norris ahead of his teammate Oscar Piastri and Lance Stroll of Aston Martin. The session was red-flagged when Kimi Antonelli beached his Mercedes at turn 9. The second free practice session was held on the same day, at 16:00 local time, and was topped by Norris followed by Fernando Alonso and Piastri. The session was red-flagged twice; the first after Stroll crashed heavily at turn 3, and the second after Alexander Albon beached his Williams at turn 1. The third free practice session was held on 30 August 2025, at 11:30 local time, and was topped by Norris ahead of Piastri and George Russell.

== Qualifying ==
Qualifying was held on 30 August 2025, at 15:00 local time (UTC+2), and determined the starting grid order for the race.

=== Qualifying classification ===
Pos.	No.	Driver	Constructor	Qualifying times			Final grid
Pos.	No.	Driver	Constructor	Q1	Q2	Q3	Final grid
1	81	(Australia) Oscar Piastri	McLaren-Mercedes	1:09.338	1:08.964	1:08.662	1
2	4	(United Kingdom) Lando Norris	McLaren-Mercedes	1:09.469	1:08.874	1:08.674	2
3	1	(Netherlands) Max Verstappen	Red Bull Racing-Honda RBPT	1:09.696	1:09.122	1:08.925	3
4	6	(France) Isack Hadjar	Racing Bulls-Honda RBPT	1:09.966	1:09.439	1:09.208	4
5	63	(United Kingdom) George Russell	Mercedes	1:09.676	1:09.313	1:09.255	5
6	16	(Monaco) Charles Leclerc	Ferrari	1:09.906	1:09.304	1:09.340	6
7	44	(United Kingdom) Lewis Hamilton	Ferrari	1:09.900	1:09.261	1:09.390	7
8	30	(New Zealand) Liam Lawson	Racing Bulls-Honda RBPT	1:09.779	1:09.383	1:09.500	8
9	55	(Spain) Carlos Sainz Jr.	Williams-Mercedes	1:09.980	1:09.472	1:09.505	9
10	14	(Spain) Fernando Alonso	Aston Martin Aramco-Mercedes	1:09.950	1:09.366	1:09.630	10
11	12	(Italy) Kimi Antonelli	Mercedes	1:09.845	1:09.493	N/A	11
12	22	(Japan) Yuki Tsunoda	Red Bull Racing-Honda RBPT	1:09.954	1:09.622	N/A	12^{1}
13	5	(Brazil) Gabriel Bortoleto	Kick Sauber-Ferrari	1:10.037	1:09.622	N/A	13^{1}
14	10	(France) Pierre Gasly	Alpine-Renault	1:09.894	1:09.637	N/A	14
15	23	(Thailand) Alexander Albon	Williams-Mercedes	1:09.792	1:09.652	N/A	15
16	43	(Argentina) Franco Colapinto	Alpine-Renault	1:10.104	N/A	N/A	16
17	27	(Germany) Nico Hülkenberg	Kick Sauber-Ferrari	1:10.195	N/A	N/A	17
18	31	(France) Esteban Ocon	Haas-Ferrari	1:10.197	N/A	N/A	18
19	87	(United Kingdom) Oliver Bearman	Haas-Ferrari	1:10.262	N/A	N/A	PL^{2}
107% time: 1:14.191
—	18	(Canada) Lance Stroll	Aston Martin Aramco-Mercedes	No time	N/A	N/A	19^{3}

Notes

- ^1 – Yuki Tsunoda and Gabriel Bortoleto set identical lap times in Q2. Tsunoda qualified ahead of Bortoleto as he set the time earlier.
- ^2 – Oliver Bearman qualified 19th, but was required to start the race from the pit lane for exceeding his quota of power unit elements and replacing them under parc fermé conditions.
- ^3 – Lance Stroll failed to set a time during qualifying. He was permitted to race at the stewards' discretion.

== Race ==
The race was held on 31 August 2025, at 15:00 local time (UTC+2), and was run for 72 laps.

=== Race report ===
Polesitter Oscar Piastri held his lead at the start, moving across the track to block his teammate Lando Norris. This disadvantaged Norris into the opening Tarzanbocht corner, and allowed Max Verstappen to challenge around the outside. Norris initially held the position, before Verstappen successfully passed him around the outside of Gerlachbocht despite struggling to control to the car and putting two wheels on the grass as the drivers entered the banked Hugenholtzbocht turn. Behind, Isack Hadjar of Racing Bulls held his career-best starting position of fourth, whilst Charles Leclerc in the Ferrari was able to pass George Russell in the Mercedes to take fifth. Sauber driver Gabriel Bortoleto, who had started 13th, struggled to pull away from his grid slot and dropped to 19th, with his troubles being worsened by front wing damage sustained from contact with Lance Stroll through the Hans Ernst Bocht chicane.

Verstappen, who was running soft tyres, was repassed by Norris around the outside of Tarzanbocht at the start of lap 9, and struggled to keep up with the Mclarens. As the first stint of the race continued, drivers reported light rain over the team radio, but not at a level which would necessitate the use of intermediate tyres. On lap 22, Leclerc became the first leading driver to pit, switching from the medium to hard tyre and rejoining in tenth place. Moments after Leclerc left the pit lane, his teammate Lewis Hamilton crashed heavily at Hugenholtzbocht leading to the safety car being deployed. This disadvantaged Leclerc, as the mandatory slowed pace of the safety car allowed Russell to make his pit stop and rejoin ahead. Both McLaren's pitted together, which led to Norris having a slightly slow stop, although Norris had a sufficient gap to Verstappen to maintain second. The race returned to green flag running at the end of lap 27, with Piastri maintaining his lead over Norris. Further back, Carlos Sainz Jr. attempted to pass Liam Lawson for seventh around the outside of Tarzanbocht. The pair made contact and both sustained punctures, with both drivers dropping a lap down after pitting for repairs. The stewards gave Sainz a ten-second penalty for causing the collision, which he voiced his disagreement with over the team radio.

On lap 31, the virtual safety car (VSC) was briefly deployed to clear debris from the track. When the VSC was withdrawn the following lap, Leclerc reacted quicker than Russell, and challenged the Mercedes driver around the outside of Hans Ernst Bocht. Leclerc dipped the left side of his car in the gravel, and made contact with Russell, but successfully completed the overtake. Russell, who sustained light damage in the incident, challenged Leclerc with the assistance of DRS as the pair began lap 33, before settling in behind. Russell's teammate Kimi Antonelli was making strong progress and passed Alexander Albon for seventh place, with Mercedes then instructing Russell to wave Antonelli through for sixth on lap 41. At the end of lap 51, Antonelli became the first leading driver to make a second pitstop for soft tyres, with Leclerc doing the same a lap later to avoid being undercut. Leclerc rejoined in seventh, just ahead of Antonelli, who immediately attempted to pass Leclerc down the inside of Hugenholtzbocht. As Antonelli attempted this pass, his front-right tyre made contact with Leclerc's rear-left, causing Leclerc to spin and heavily crash into the barrier.

Following Leclerc's crash, the safety car was deployed, and Antonelli was given a ten-second penalty for causing the collision. The leading McLarens immediately pitted for hard tyres, with the third to sixth placed drivers of Verstappen, Hadjar, Russell and Albon taking softs. The race resumed at the end of lap 57. On lap 65, Norris's car started to emit smoke, and he quickly began to slow before pulling over on the exit of Mastersbocht, causing the safety car to be deployed for a third time. The race resumed again on lap 68, with Piastri comfortably completing the final laps to take his seventh Grand Prix win of the season, and the ninth of his career; McLaren took their 12th win of the season, and their first Grand chelem since the 1998 Monaco Grand Prix whilst Verstappen continued his 100% podium record at his home race by finishing second, and Hadjar took his first Grand Prix podium by finishing third. This was Racing Bulls's first podium under their current name, and their first since Pierre Gasly finished third at the 2021 Azerbaijan Grand Prix, which the team competed in as AlphaTauri.

=== Post-race ===
Following the race, Williams submitted an appeal; the stewards arranged a right of review hearing on 12 September. The stewards agreed with the team's description of the event as a racing incident; the two penalty points Sainz received were removed from his superlicence, but the time penalty was not overturned as it had already been served during the race.

=== Race classification ===
Pos.	No.	Driver	Constructor	Laps	Time/Retired	Grid	Points
1	81	(Australia) Oscar Piastri	McLaren-Mercedes	72	1:38:29.849	1	25
2	1	(Netherlands) Max Verstappen	Red Bull Racing-Honda RBPT	72	+1.271	3	18
3	6	(France) Isack Hadjar	Racing Bulls-Honda RBPT	72	+3.233	4	15
4	63	(United Kingdom) George Russell	Mercedes	72	+5.654	5	12
5	23	(Thailand) Alexander Albon	Williams-Mercedes	72	+6.327	15	10
6	87	(United Kingdom) Oliver Bearman	Haas-Ferrari	72	+9.044	PL	8
7	18	(Canada) Lance Stroll	Aston Martin Aramco-Mercedes	72	+9.497	19	6
8	14	(Spain) Fernando Alonso	Aston Martin Aramco-Mercedes	72	+11.709	10	4
9	22	(Japan) Yuki Tsunoda	Red Bull Racing-Honda RBPT	72	+13.597	12	2
10	31	(France) Esteban Ocon	Haas-Ferrari	72	+14.063	18	1
11	43	(Argentina) Franco Colapinto	Alpine-Renault	72	+14.511	16	
12	30	(New Zealand) Liam Lawson	Racing Bulls-Honda RBPT	72	+17.063	8	
13	55	(Spain) Carlos Sainz Jr.	Williams-Mercedes	72	+17.376	9	
14	27	(Germany) Nico Hülkenberg	Kick Sauber-Ferrari	72	+19.725	17	
15	5	(Brazil) Gabriel Bortoleto	Kick Sauber-Ferrari	72	+21.565	13	
16	12	(Italy) Kimi Antonelli	Mercedes	72	+22.029^{1}	11	
17	10	(France) Pierre Gasly	Alpine-Renault	72	+23.629	14	
18^{2}	4	(United Kingdom) Lando Norris	McLaren-Mercedes	64	Chassis	2	
Ret	16	(Monaco) Charles Leclerc	Ferrari	52	Collision	6	
Ret	44	(United Kingdom) Lewis Hamilton	Ferrari	22	Accident	7	

Notes

- ^1 – Kimi Antonelli finished sixth, but received a ten-second time penalty for causing a collision with Charles Leclerc and a five-second time penalty for speeding in the pit lane.
- ^2 – Lando Norris was classified as he completed more than 90% of the race distance.

== Championship standings after the race ==
Drivers' Championship standings

Pos.	Driver	Points
1	(Australia) Oscar Piastri	309
2	(United Kingdom) Lando Norris	275
3	(Netherlands) Max Verstappen	205
4	(United Kingdom) George Russell	184
5	(Monaco) Charles Leclerc	151

Constructors' Championship standings

Pos.	Constructor	Points
1	(United Kingdom) McLaren-Mercedes	584
2	(Italy) Ferrari	260
3	(Germany) Mercedes	248
4	(Austria) Red Bull Racing-Honda RBPT	214
5	(United Kingdom) Williams-Mercedes	80

- Note: Only the top five positions are included for both sets of standings.

Previous race: 2025 Hungarian Grand Prix	FIA Formula One World Championship; 2025 season	Next race: 2025 Italian Grand Prix
Previous race: 2024 Dutch Grand Prix	Dutch Grand Prix	Next race: 2026 Dutch Grand Prix
