= 2025 Italian Grand Prix =

Formula One motor race

Race 16 of 24 in the 2025 Formula One World Championship
← Previous race	Next race →
- Layout of the Autodromo Nazionale di Monza

Race details
- Date: 7 September 2025
- Official name: Formula 1 Pirelli Gran Premio d'Italia 2025
- Location: Monza Circuit; Monza, Italy
- Course: Permanent racing facility
- Course length: 5.793 km (3.600 miles)
- Distance: 53 laps, 306.720 km (190.587 miles)
- Weather: Sunny
- Attendance: 369,041

Pole position
Driver	(Netherlands) Max Verstappen	Red Bull Racing-Honda RBPT
- Time: 1:18.792

Fastest lap
Driver	(United Kingdom) Lando Norris	McLaren-Mercedes
- Time: 1:20.901 on lap 53 (lap record)

Podium
First	(Netherlands) Max Verstappen	Red Bull Racing-Honda RBPT
Second	(United Kingdom) Lando Norris	McLaren-Mercedes
Third	(Australia) Oscar Piastri	McLaren-Mercedes

The 2025 Italian Grand Prix (officially known as the Formula 1 Pirelli Gran Premio d'Italia 2025) was a Formula One motor race that was held on 7 September 2025 at the Monza Circuit in Monza, Italy. It was the sixteenth round of the 2025 Formula One World Championship. Max Verstappen of Red Bull converted his pole position into his third win of the season ahead of McLaren drivers Lando Norris and Oscar Piastri. The event saw several Formula One speed records, with new records being set for the fastest pole position lap, fastest race lap, fastest winning race time and fastest average race speed.

The result meant that Norris reduced his deficit in the World Drivers' Championship over Piastri to 31 points, Verstappen closed the gap to Piastri by ten points to 94. McLaren reached 617 points. Ferrari remained second with 280 points, 20 and 41 points clear from Mercedes and Red Bull in third and fourth, respectively.

== Background ==
The event was held at the Monza Circuit in Monza for the 75th time in the circuit's history, across the weekend of 5–7 September. The Grand Prix was the sixteenth round of the 2025 Formula One World Championship and the 76th running of the Italian Grand Prix as a round of the Formula One World Championship.

=== Championship standings before the race ===
Going into the weekend, Oscar Piastri led the Drivers' Championship with 309 points, 34 points ahead of teammate Lando Norris in second and 104 ahead of Max Verstappen in third. McLaren, with 584 points, led the Constructors' Championship from Ferrari and Mercedes, who were second and third with 260 and 248 points, respectively.

=== Entrants ===
The drivers and teams were the same as published in the season entry list with two exceptions; Yuki Tsunoda at Red Bull Racing was in the seat originally held by Liam Lawson before the latter was demoted back to Racing Bulls from the Japanese Grand Prix onward, and Franco Colapinto replaced Jack Doohan at Alpine from the Emilia Romagna Grand Prix onward until at least the Austrian Grand Prix on a rotating seat basis. Before the race at Spielberg, it was confirmed that Colapinto would retain his seat with the team, effectively on a race-by-race basis.

During the first free practice session, two teams fielded drivers who had not raced in more than two Grands Prix, as required by the Formula One regulations:

- Alex Dunne for McLaren in place of Oscar Piastri.
- Paul Aron for Alpine in place of Franco Colapinto.

=== Tyre choices ===
Tyre supplier Pirelli brought the C3, C4 and C5 tyre compounds (designated hard, medium, and soft, respectively) for teams to use at the event.

=== Penalties ===
Lewis Hamilton of Ferrari carried a five-place grid penalty for failing to slow under double yellow flags at the preceding Dutch Grand Prix.

== Practice ==
Three free practice sessions were held for the event. The first free practice session was held on 5 September 2025, at 13:30 local time (UTC+2), and was topped by Lewis Hamilton ahead of his Ferrari teammate Charles Leclerc and Carlos Sainz Jr. in the Williams. The second free practice session was held on the same day, at 17:00 local time, and was topped by Lando Norris ahead of Leclerc and Sainz. The session was red-flagged due to Kimi Antonelli beaching his car at turn 7. The third free practice session was held on 6 September 2025, at 12:30 local time, and was topped by Norris ahead of Leclerc and Norris's teammate Oscar Piastri.

== Qualifying ==
Qualifying was held on 6 September 2025, at 16:00 local time (UTC+2), and determined the starting grid order for the race.

=== Qualifying report ===
Max Verstappen took pole position with the fastest lap in Formula One history at an average speed of 264.681 km/h (164.465 mph), eclipsing a record held by Lewis Hamilton from the 2020 event.

=== Qualifying classification ===
Pos.	No.	Driver	Constructor	Qualifying times			Final grid
Pos.	No.	Driver	Constructor	Q1	Q2	Q3	Final grid
1	1	(Netherlands) Max Verstappen	Red Bull Racing-Honda RBPT	1:19.455	1:19.140	1:18.792	1
2	4	(United Kingdom) Lando Norris	McLaren-Mercedes	1:19.517	1:19.293	1:18.869	2
3	81	(Australia) Oscar Piastri	McLaren-Mercedes	1:19.711	1:19.286	1:18.982	3
4	16	(Monaco) Charles Leclerc	Ferrari	1:19.689	1:19.310	1:19.007	4
5	44	(United Kingdom) Lewis Hamilton	Ferrari	1:19.765	1:19.371	1:19.124	10^{1}
6	63	(United Kingdom) George Russell	Mercedes	1:19.414	1:19.287	1:19.157	5
7	12	(Italy) Kimi Antonelli	Mercedes	1:19.747	1:19.245	1:19.200	6
8	5	(Brazil) Gabriel Bortoleto	Kick Sauber-Ferrari	1:19.688	1:19.323	1:19.390	7
9	14	(Spain) Fernando Alonso	Aston Martin Aramco-Mercedes	1:19.658	1:19.362	1:19.424	8
10	22	(Japan) Yuki Tsunoda	Red Bull Racing-Honda RBPT	1:19.619	1:19.433	1:19.519	9
11	87	(United Kingdom) Oliver Bearman	Haas-Ferrari	1:19.688	1:19.446	N/A	11
12	27	(Germany) Nico Hülkenberg	Kick Sauber-Ferrari	1:19.777	1:19.498	N/A	12
13	55	(Spain) Carlos Sainz Jr.	Williams-Mercedes	1:19.644	1:19.528	N/A	13
14	23	(Thailand) Alexander Albon	Williams-Mercedes	1:19.837	1:19.583	N/A	14
15	31	(France) Esteban Ocon	Haas-Ferrari	1:19.816	1:19.707	N/A	15
16	6	(France) Isack Hadjar	Racing Bulls-Honda RBPT	1:19.917	N/A	N/A	PL^{2}
17	18	(Canada) Lance Stroll	Aston Martin Aramco-Mercedes	1:19.948	N/A	N/A	16
18	43	(Argentina) Franco Colapinto	Alpine-Renault	1:19.992	N/A	N/A	17
19	10	(France) Pierre Gasly	Alpine-Renault	1:20.103	N/A	N/A	PL^{2}
20	30	(New Zealand) Liam Lawson	Racing Bulls-Honda RBPT	1:20.279	N/A	N/A	18
107% time: 1:24.972

Notes

- ^1 – Lewis Hamilton received a five-place grid penalty for failing to slow under double yellow flags at the preceding Dutch Grand Prix.
- ^2 – Isack Hadjar and Pierre Gasly qualified 16th and 19th, respectively, but were required to start the race from the pit lane for exceeding their quota of power unit elements and replacing them under parc fermé conditions.

== Race ==
The race was held on 7 September 2025, at 15:00 local time (UTC+2), and was run for 53 laps.

=== Race report ===
Nico Hülkenberg of Sauber, who had been due to start 12th, pulled into the pit lane to retire at the end of the formation lap with a hydraulic failure. With Isack Hadjar of Racing Bulls and Pierre Gasly of Alpine starting from the pit lane, 17 drivers took the starting grid for the race. Polesitter Max Verstappen did not get as strong a start as second-placed Lando Norris. Verstappen quickly moved across the track to block Norris, resulting in Norris' right side wheels briefly touching the trackside grass, Verstappen could not prevent Norris from taking the advantageous inside line for the Rettifilo chicane. Verstappen cut across the run-off area, keeping his position in the process. Behind the two leaders, Norris' teammate Oscar Piastri, who had started third, was passed at the Rettifilo by Charles Leclerc in the Ferrari; Piastri was able to retake the position shortly after by passing Leclerc around the outside at the first Lesmo corner.

In order to avoid a potential penalty for leaving the track and gaining an advantage, Verstappen was quickly instructed over team radio to cede the lead to Norris, an order which he obeyed entering the Rettifilo on lap 2. Piastri attempted to take advantage of this and challenge Verstappen himself, however in doing so compromised his exit from the chicane and allowed Leclerc to pass him for a second time around the outside of the Curva Grande. Further back, Lance Stroll in the Aston Martin attempted to pass Esteban Ocon's Haas for 14th place at the Roggia chicane, however he was forced to take to the run-off area and drop positions after Ocon moved across the track and squeezed Stroll onto the grass; stewards would give Ocon a five-second time penalty for forcing another driver off the circuit.

As drivers began to settle into the race, Verstappen continued to apply pressure on Norris and retook the lead at the start of lap 4 around the outside of the Rettifilo. On lap 5 Ferrari's Lewis Hamilton, who had already gained two positions on the opening lap to move into eighth, passed Aston Martin's Fernando Alonso down the inside at the same corner to take seventh. On lap 6, Piastri passed Leclerc around the outside of the Rettifilo to move back into third, with Hamilton passing Sauber's Gabriel Bortoleto at the start of the following lap to take sixth. On lap 18, Kimi Antonelli passed Yuki Tsunoda down the inside of the Rettifilo to take ninth. At the end of lap 20, both Bortoleto and Alonso made what they intended to be their sole pit stop of the race. Bortoleto's stop was slow, allowing Alonso to jump ahead of him and re-join in 15th, with Bortoleto also emerging behind Liam Lawson, who had already made his stop, although Bortoleto quickly repassed Lawson. On lap 25, Alonso's race ended suddenly as he suffered a front-right suspension failure whilst exiting the Ascari complex, although he was able to return to the pit lane.

With tyre wear proving to be low, the leaders were in no rush to make their mandatory pit stop. Verstappen, who had comfortably maintained a five-second lead over Norris, pitted at the end of lap 37 and re-joined in third behind the McLarens. On lap 40, Carlos Sainz Jr. attempted to pass Oliver Bearman for 13th place, resulting in the pair running side-by-side as they entered the Roggia chicane. Sainz, who was on the outside, was ahead entering the corner, causing Bearman to brake late, in order to defend his position. Bearman's front-right tire made contact with Sainz's rear-left, resulting in both drivers spinning, and allowing Hadjar to pass both as they returned to the track. The stewards gave Bearman a ten-second penalty for the incident as well as two penalty points. On lap 45, Piastri became the first McLaren to make a pit stop, taking soft tyres and maintaining third place. Race leader Norris dove into the pits on the following lap, but had a slow stop due to an issue with his front-left tyre, and emerged behind his championship rival Piastri. McLaren quickly requested to Piastri that he allow Norris to repass him, reminding him over team radio of how Norris had done similar after undercutting him during the previous year's Hungarian Grand Prix. Piastri stated over team radio that he "did not really get" why he should let Norris through, but complied with the instruction and waved Norris through at the start of lap 49.

Verstappen comfortably won the race ahead of the McLarens, taking his 66th career Grand Prix win as well as his third win of the season. With an average speed of 250.706 km/h (155.781 mph), it was the fastest race in Formula One history, beating Michael Schumacher's record from the same event in 2003. Norris' fastest lap, set on the final lap, also set a new record for the fastest race lap in Formula One history, averaging 257.781 km/h (160.178 mph) and beating Rubens Barrichello's record from the 2004 edition.

=== Race classification ===
Pos.	No.	Driver	Constructor	Laps	Time/Retired	Grid	Points
1	1	(Netherlands) Max Verstappen	Red Bull Racing-Honda RBPT	53	1:13:24.325	1	25
2	4	(United Kingdom) Lando Norris	McLaren-Mercedes	53	+19.207	2	18
3	81	(Australia) Oscar Piastri	McLaren-Mercedes	53	+21.351	3	15
4	16	(Monaco) Charles Leclerc	Ferrari	53	+25.624	4	12
5	63	(United Kingdom) George Russell	Mercedes	53	+32.881	5	10
6	44	(United Kingdom) Lewis Hamilton	Ferrari	53	+37.449	10	8
7	23	(Thailand) Alexander Albon	Williams-Mercedes	53	+50.537	14	6
8	5	(Brazil) Gabriel Bortoleto	Kick Sauber-Ferrari	53	+58.484	7	4
9	12	(Italy) Kimi Antonelli	Mercedes	53	+59.762^{1}	6	2
10	6	(France) Isack Hadjar	Racing Bulls-Honda RBPT	53	+1:03.891	PL	1
11	55	(Spain) Carlos Sainz Jr.	Williams-Mercedes	53	+1:04.469	13	
12	87	(United Kingdom) Oliver Bearman	Haas-Ferrari	53	+1:19.288^{2}	11	
13	22	(Japan) Yuki Tsunoda	Red Bull Racing-Honda RBPT	53	+1:20.701	9	
14	30	(New Zealand) Liam Lawson	Racing Bulls-Honda RBPT	53	+1:22.351	18	
15	31	(France) Esteban Ocon	Haas-Ferrari	52	+1 lap	15	
16	10	(France) Pierre Gasly	Alpine-Renault	52	+1 lap	PL	
17	43	(Argentina) Franco Colapinto	Alpine-Renault	52	+1 lap	17	
18	18	(Canada) Lance Stroll	Aston Martin Aramco-Mercedes	52	+1 lap	16	
Ret	14	(Spain) Fernando Alonso	Aston Martin Aramco-Mercedes	24	Suspension	8	
DNS	27	(Germany) Nico Hülkenberg	Kick Sauber-Ferrari	0	Hydraulics	—^{3}	

Notes

- ^1 – Kimi Antonelli finished eighth, but received a five-second time penalty for forcing Alexander Albon off-track.
- ^2 – Oliver Bearman received a ten-second time penalty for causing a collision with Carlos Sainz Jr.. His final position was not affected by the penalty.
- ^3 – Nico Hülkenberg did not start the race due to a hydraulic issue during the formation lap. His place on the grid was left vacant.

== Championship standings after the race ==
Drivers' Championship standings

Pos.	Driver	Points
1	(Australia) Oscar Piastri	324
2	(United Kingdom) Lando Norris	293
3	(Netherlands) Max Verstappen	230
4	(United Kingdom) George Russell	194
5	(Monaco) Charles Leclerc	163

Constructors' Championship standings

Pos.	Constructor	Points
1	(United Kingdom) McLaren-Mercedes	617
2	(Italy) Ferrari	280
3	(Germany) Mercedes	260
4	(Austria) Red Bull Racing-Honda RBPT	239
5	(United Kingdom) Williams-Mercedes	86

- Note: Only the top five positions are included for both sets of standings.

== See also ==
- 2025 Monza Formula 2 round
- 2025 Monza Formula 3 round

Previous race: 2025 Dutch Grand Prix	FIA Formula One World Championship; 2025 season	Next race: 2025 Azerbaijan Grand Prix
Previous race: 2024 Italian Grand Prix	Italian Grand Prix	Next race: 2026 Italian Grand Prix
