= 2025 British Grand Prix =

Formula One motor race

Race 12 of 24 in the 2025 Formula One World Championship
← Previous race	Next race →
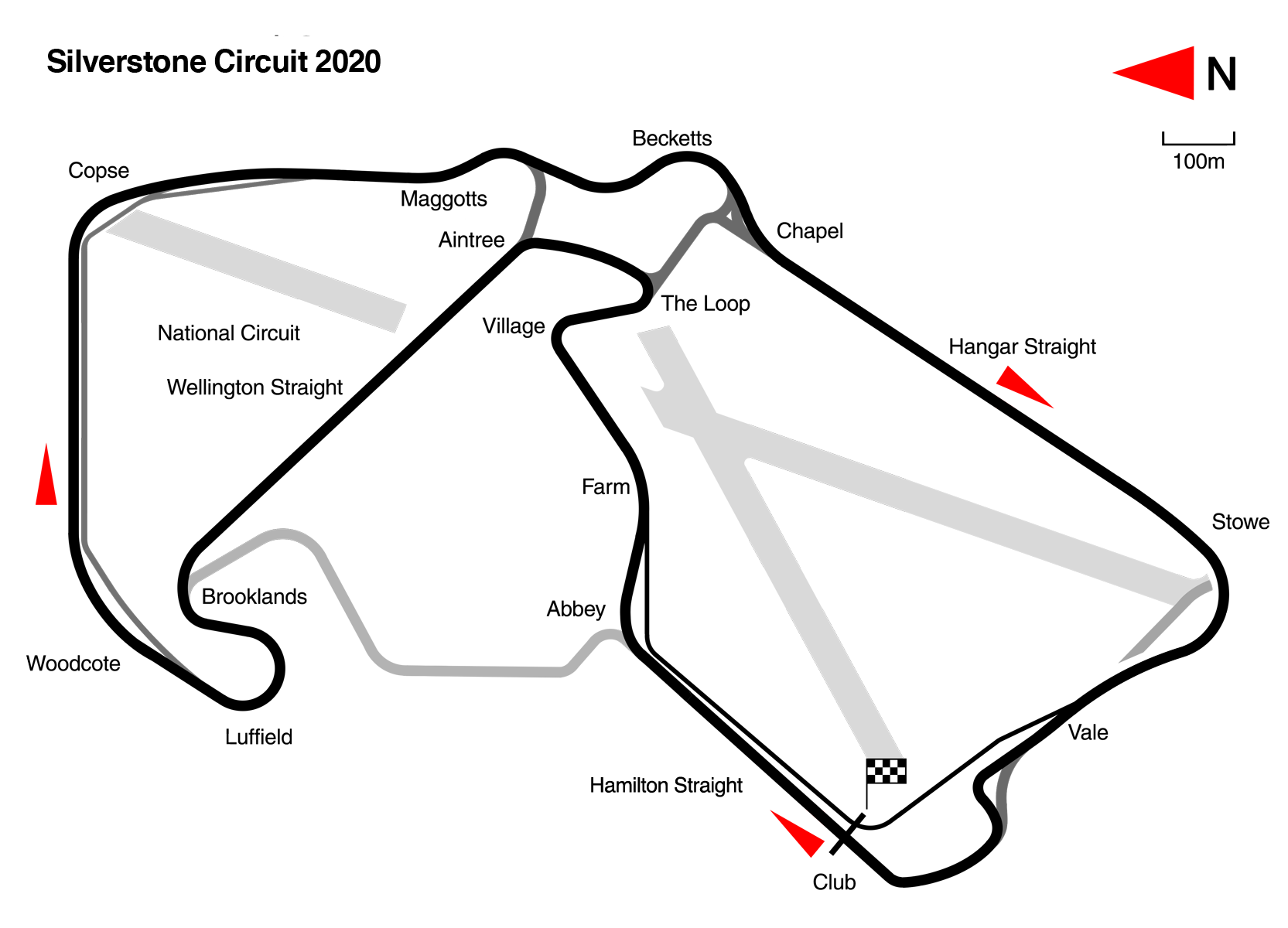
- Layout of the Silverstone Circuit

Race details
- Date: 6 July 2025
- Official name: Formula 1 Qatar Airways British Grand Prix 2025
- Location: Silverstone Circuit; Silverstone, United Kingdom
- Course: Permanent racing facility
- Course length: 5.891 km (3.660 miles)
- Distance: 52 laps, 306.198 km (190.263 miles)
- Weather: Intermittent rain
- Attendance: 500,000

Pole position
Driver	(Netherlands) Max Verstappen	Red Bull Racing-Honda RBPT
- Time: 1:24.892

Fastest lap
Driver	(Australia) Oscar Piastri	McLaren-Mercedes
- Time: 1:29.337 on lap 51

Podium
First	(United Kingdom) Lando Norris	McLaren-Mercedes
Second	(Australia) Oscar Piastri	McLaren-Mercedes
Third	(Germany) Nico Hülkenberg	Kick Sauber-Ferrari

The 2025 British Grand Prix (officially known as the Formula 1 Qatar Airways British Grand Prix 2025) was a Formula One motor race that took place on 6 July 2025 at the Silverstone Circuit in Northamptonshire, England. It was the twelfth round of the 2025 Formula One World Championship.

Max Verstappen of Red Bull Racing took pole position for the race. Lando Norris of McLaren won the race ahead of his teammate Oscar Piastri, for McLaren's first win at Silverstone since 2008. Nico Hülkenberg of Sauber took his maiden career podium after 239 race starts and Sauber's first since the 2012 Japanese Grand Prix when Kamui Kobayashi finished third. It was Sauber's final podium before their acquisition by Audi for 2026 onwards.

Following his second consecutive Grand Prix victory, Norris reduced the gap to Piastri to just eight points. Verstappen remained in third with 165 points, 69 behind Piastri. In the Constructors' Championship, the top five remained unchanged, with reigning champion and championship leader McLaren extending their lead to 238 points over Ferrari in second.

== Background ==
The Silverstone Circuit in Northamptonshire hosted a Formula One Grand Prix for the 60th time in the circuit's history, across the weekend of 4–6 July, having previously hosted 58 editions of the British Grand Prix, and the 70th Anniversary Grand Prix in 2020. The Grand Prix was the twelfth round of the 2025 Formula One World Championship and the 76th running of the British Grand Prix as a round of the Formula One World Championship.

=== Championship standings before the race ===
Going into the weekend, Oscar Piastri led the Drivers' Championship with 216 points, 15 points ahead of his teammate Lando Norris in second, and 61 ahead of Max Verstappen in third. McLaren, with 417 points, led the Constructors' Championship from Ferrari and Mercedes, who are second and third with 210 and 209 points, respectively.

=== Entrants ===
The drivers and teams were the same as published in the season entry list with two exceptions; Yuki Tsunoda at Red Bull Racing was in the seat originally held by Liam Lawson before the latter was demoted back to Racing Bulls from the Japanese Grand Prix onward, and Franco Colapinto replaced Jack Doohan at Alpine from the Emilia Romagna Grand Prix onward until at least the preceding Austrian Grand Prix on a rotating seat basis. Before the Austrian Grand Prix, it was confirmed that Colapinto would retain his seat with the team, effectively on a race-by-race basis.

During the first free practice session, two teams fielded drivers who had not raced in more than two Grands Prix, as required by the Formula One regulations:

- Arvid Lindblad for Red Bull Racing in place of Yuki Tsunoda.
- Paul Aron for Sauber in place of Nico Hülkenberg.

Both made their Formula One practice debut.

The Grand Prix marked the last appearance for Christian Horner as team principal of Red Bull Racing, as he was sacked three days after the race and replaced by Laurent Mekies, who left his role as team principal of Racing Bulls, from the following Belgian Grand Prix onward.

=== Tyre choices ===
Tyre supplier Pirelli brought the C2, C3, and C4 tyre compounds designated hard, medium, and soft, respectively, for teams to use at the event.

=== Penalties ===
Kimi Antonelli of Mercedes carried a three-place grid penalty for causing a collision with Max Verstappen of Red Bull Racing at the preceding Austrian Grand Prix.

== Practice ==
Three free practice sessions were held for the event. The first free practice session was held on 4 July 2025, at 12:30 local time (UTC+1), and was topped by Lewis Hamilton of Ferrari followed by Lando Norris of McLaren and his teammate Oscar Piastri. The second free practice session was held on the same day, at 16:00 local time, and was topped by Norris ahead of Charles Leclerc of Ferrari and his teammate Hamilton.

The third free practice session was held on 5 July 2025, and was scheduled to start at 11:30 local time before being delayed to 11:35. The session was topped by Leclerc ahead of Piastri and Max Verstappen of Red Bull Racing. The session saw two red flags; one for carbon fibre on the track, and the second during the final minutes following a spin from Gabriel Bortoleto of Sauber that left him beached and with his front-left suspension broken. During this red flag, Oliver Bearman of Haas had a spin entering the pit lane and hit the barriers, losing his front wing. He received a ten-place grid penalty for failing to drive safely back to the pits under the red flag conditions.

== Qualifying ==
Qualifying was held on 5 July 2025, at 15:00 local time (UTC+1), and determined the starting grid order for the race.

=== Qualifying report ===
During Q1 there was a red flag when Franco Colapinto of Alpine spun into the gravel at Club corner and hit the barriers. While Colapinto was able to drive his car out of the gravel, it was too badly damaged to continue, so he stopped on the side of the track.

=== Qualifying classification ===
Pos.	No.	Driver	Constructor	Qualifying times			Final grid
Pos.	No.	Driver	Constructor	Q1	Q2	Q3	Final grid
1	1	(Netherlands) Max Verstappen	Red Bull Racing-Honda RBPT	1:25.886	1:25.316	1:24.892	1
2	81	(Australia) Oscar Piastri	McLaren-Mercedes	1:25.963	1:25.316	1:24.995	2
3	4	(United Kingdom) Lando Norris	McLaren-Mercedes	1:26.123	1:25.231	1:25.010	3
4	63	(United Kingdom) George Russell	Mercedes	1:26.236	1:25.637	1:25.029	4
5	44	(United Kingdom) Lewis Hamilton	Ferrari	1:26.296	1:25.084	1:25.095	5
6	16	(Monaco) Charles Leclerc	Ferrari	1:26.186	1:25.133	1:25.121	6
7	12	(Italy) Kimi Antonelli	Mercedes	1:26.265	1:25.620	1:25.374	10^{1}
8	87	(United Kingdom) Oliver Bearman	Haas-Ferrari	1:26.005	1:25.534	1:25.471	18^{2}
9	14	(Spain) Fernando Alonso	Aston Martin Aramco-Mercedes	1:26.108	1:25.593	1:25.621	7
10	10	(France) Pierre Gasly	Alpine-Renault	1:26.328	1:25.711	1:25.785	8
11	55	(Spain) Carlos Sainz Jr.	Williams-Mercedes	1:26.175	1:25.746	N/A	9
12	22	(Japan) Yuki Tsunoda	Red Bull Racing-Honda RBPT	1:26.275	1:25.826	N/A	11
13	6	(France) Isack Hadjar	Racing Bulls-Honda RBPT	1:26.177	1:25.864	N/A	12
14	23	(Thailand) Alexander Albon	Williams-Mercedes	1:26.093	1:25.889	N/A	13
15	31	(France) Esteban Ocon	Haas-Ferrari	1:26.136	1:25.950	N/A	14
16	30	(New Zealand) Liam Lawson	Racing Bulls-Honda RBPT	1:26.440	N/A	N/A	15
17	5	(Brazil) Gabriel Bortoleto	Kick Sauber-Ferrari	1:26.446	N/A	N/A	16
18	18	(Canada) Lance Stroll	Aston Martin Aramco-Mercedes	1:26.504	N/A	N/A	17
19	27	(Germany) Nico Hülkenberg	Kick Sauber-Ferrari	1:26.574	N/A	N/A	19
20	43	(Argentina) Franco Colapinto	Alpine-Renault	1:27.060	N/A	N/A	PL^{3}
107% time: 1:31.898

Notes

- ^1 – Kimi Antonelli received a three-place grid penalty for causing a collision with Max Verstappen at the preceding Austrian Grand Prix.
- ^2 – Oliver Bearman received a ten-place grid penalty for a red flag infringement during the third free practice session.
- ^3 – Franco Colapinto qualified 20th, but was required to start the race from the pit lane for exceeding his quota of power unit elements and replacing them under parc fermé conditions.

== Race ==
The race was held on 6 July 2025, at 15:00 local time (UTC+1), and was run for 52 laps.

=== Race report ===
After heavy rain in the day's earlier support races, the Grand Prix began on a damp track. While all drivers left the grid on the intermediate tyre compound, multiple drivers pitted for slicks at the end of the formation lap. The highest placed of these drivers were George Russell of Mercedes, who had been due to start fourth, and Charles Leclerc of Ferrari, who had been due to start sixth. Isack Hadjar of Racing Bulls, Gabriel Bortoleto of Sauber and Oliver Bearman of Haas also pitted. These stops, alongside a pit lane start for Alpine's Franco Colapinto (who would not start the race due to a gearbox issue) meant that fourteen of the twenty scheduled starters lined up for the standing start.

Polesitter Max Verstappen of Red Bull held his lead at the start, holding off a challenge from second-starting Oscar Piastri of McLaren by sweeping around the outside at the fast Abbey turn. Green flag running would not last long, as Esteban Ocon of Haas, who had qualified 14th but started 11th due to cars pitting on the formation lap, attempted to pass Racing Bulls driver Liam Lawson down the inside of The Loop, which led to the pair running side-by-side through the fast Aintree corner. Verstappen's teammate, Yuki Tsunoda, attempted to pass down the inside of both, leaving Ocon with no space to avoid making contact with Lawson. The ensuing collision sent Lawson off the track and ended his race, with the virtual safety car (VSC) being deployed in order to clear the incident. While the VSC was deployed, Mercedes's Kimi Antonelli, who had completed the first lap in eighth, pitted for slicks. The mandatory slowed pace under the VSC allowed Antonelli to rejoin the race ahead of the drivers who had pitted on the formation lap, leaving him 13th overall. The VSC ended on lap 4. At the restart Bortoleto, running in 17th, lost control on slick tyres and spun off at Farm, hitting the barriers. While Bortoleto briefly attempted to rejoin the race, the rear wing of his Sauber was severely damaged and he quickly pulled to the side of the track, leading to the VSC being deployed again. Under this VSC period, Lance Stroll of Aston Martin, who had been running in 11th, pitted for slicks and, like Antonelli, was able to rejoin in front of those whom had already pitted.

The race returned to green flag running on lap 7, with leader Verstappen immediately struggling due to his low downforce setup and overheating intermediate tyres. After applying pressure for several corners, Piastri was able to take the lead from Verstappen entering Stowe corner on lap 8. By lap 11 the rain was intensifying once more, and drivers running on the slick tyres quickly pitted to switch back to the intermediate compound. Piastri's teammate, third-placed Lando Norris, had by now caught Verstappen, and promptly took second when the Dutchman ran off the track at Chapel. However, the entire top seven pitted for new intermediate tyres at the end of the lap, allowing Verstappen to pass Norris again by having his Red Bull crew perform a faster pit stop than Norris' McLaren crew, who were disadvantaged by having to perform a pitstop for Piastri immediately before servicing Norris. With drivers now struggling to stay on track even with intermediate tyres, the safety car was deployed on lap 14 due to poor visibility caused by spray. The top ten at this time were: Piastri, Verstappen, Norris, Stroll, Nico Hülkenberg of Sauber, Pierre Gasly of Alpine, Ocon, who was yet to pit, Lewis Hamilton of Ferrari, Russell and Fernando Alonso of Aston Martin. Stroll and Hülkenberg had both moved up the order as a result of anticipating the increased rain and stopping early. The safety car came in at the end of lap 17, with Russell immediately passing Hamilton for eighth at Abbey, only for Hamilton to pass Russell around the outside at Village seconds later while both drivers were in the process of overtaking Ocon. Hadjar, who was running in 16th, misjudged his speed entering Copse, causing him to drive into the back of Antonelli. The contact caused Hadjar to spin into the barrier and crash heavily, leading to another safety car deployment.

During the second safety car period Ocon pitted for new intermediates, returning to the track in 16th and last. Antonelli also pitted and, while he initially returned to the track, would retire due to damage sustained in the collision with Hadjar. The safety car came in at the end of lap 21. While preparing to lead the restart, Piastri braked heavily to the point where he was briefly overtaken by Verstappen; Piastri was given a ten-second time penalty for "erratic" braking. As Piastri then sped up and led the field through Stowe, Verstappen lost the rear of his car and half-spun, dropping him to tenth place behind Norris, Stroll, Hülkenberg, Gasly, Hamilton, Russell, Alonso and Carlos Sainz Jr. of Williams. Further around the lap Tsunoda made contact with Bearman at Brooklands while disputing 13th place, causing Bearman to spin down to 15th. Tsunoda received a ten-second time penalty for causing a collision.

On lap 24 Hamilton ceded sixth place to Russell after running wide on the exit of Copse. Russell's gain would again be short-lived, as Hamilton retook the position on lap 26 at Stowe. On lap 29 Hamilton took fifth from Gasly by overtaking down the inside of the Vale chicane. On lap 34 Hülkenberg overtook Stroll for third at Stowe. Hamilton passed Stroll on the following lap at Village. With the track drying, some drivers began to consider a switch to slick tyres. Alonso was the first to attempt such a switch on lap 37, followed by Russell on lap 38. However, both drivers initially struggled on a track which was still wet for much of the lap with Russell spinning dramatically at Becketts. On lap 41 Verstappen overtook Gasly for sixth at Village. By now the circuit was becoming more suitable for slicks, and Hamilton, Stroll, Verstappen and Gasly all made the change at the end of the lap. On lap 43 Haas teammates Bearman and Ocon made contact at Brooklands while disputing 11th position, causing both drivers to spin and drop positions. On lap 44 race leader Piastri made the change to slicks, serving his ten-second penalty in the process. This meant that, when Norris made his stop the following lap, he rejoined with a lead of more than five seconds over his teammate. Piastri commented over team radio that his penalty was "not fair" and suggested that Norris should allow him back into the lead.

Norris maintained his gap over Piastri to take his first British Grand Prix win and become the 13th British driver to win at home. Additionally, Norris gave McLaren its first British Grand Prix win since Hamilton in 2008, and they scored their first one-two at Silverstone since 2000. By finishing third, Hülkenberg scored his first Grand Prix podium at his 239th start, setting a new record for the longest wait for a podium. Hülkenberg also gave Sauber its first podium since Kamui Kobayashi finished third in the 2012 Japanese Grand Prix. Fourth-placed Hamilton saw his long streak of consecutive podiums in his home country end at twelve as he finished off the podium at Silverstone for the first time since 2013. His former team Mercedes were absent from the Silverstone rostrum for the first time since 2012. Gasly overtook Stroll at Stowe on the final lap to take sixth place, securing his highest finish of the season thus far.

=== Race classification ===
Pos.	No.	Driver	Constructor	Laps	Time/Retired	Grid	Points
1	4	(United Kingdom) Lando Norris	McLaren-Mercedes	52	1:37:15.735	3	25
2	81	(Australia) Oscar Piastri	McLaren-Mercedes	52	+6.812	2	18
3	27	(Germany) Nico Hülkenberg	Kick Sauber-Ferrari	52	+34.742	19	15
4	44	(United Kingdom) Lewis Hamilton	Ferrari	52	+39.812	5	12
5	1	(Netherlands) Max Verstappen	Red Bull Racing-Honda RBPT	52	+56.781	1	10
6	10	(France) Pierre Gasly	Alpine-Renault	52	+59.857	8	8
7	18	(Canada) Lance Stroll	Aston Martin Aramco-Mercedes	52	+1:00.603	17	6
8	23	(Thailand) Alexander Albon	Williams-Mercedes	52	+1:04.135	13	4
9	14	(Spain) Fernando Alonso	Aston Martin Aramco-Mercedes	52	+1:05.858	7	2
10	63	(United Kingdom) George Russell	Mercedes	52	+1:10.674	4	1
11	87	(United Kingdom) Oliver Bearman	Haas-Ferrari	52	+1:12.095	18	
12	55	(Spain) Carlos Sainz Jr.	Williams-Mercedes	52	+1:16.592	9	
13	31	(France) Esteban Ocon	Haas-Ferrari	52	+1:17.301	14	
14	16	(Monaco) Charles Leclerc	Ferrari	52	+1:24.477	6	
15	22	(Japan) Yuki Tsunoda	Red Bull Racing-Honda RBPT	51	+1 lap	11	
Ret	12	(Italy) Kimi Antonelli	Mercedes	23	Collision damage	10	
Ret	6	(France) Isack Hadjar	Racing Bulls-Honda RBPT	17	Accident	12	
Ret	5	(Brazil) Gabriel Bortoleto	Kick Sauber-Ferrari	3	Accident	16	
Ret	30	(New Zealand) Liam Lawson	Racing Bulls-Honda RBPT	0	Collision	15	
DNS	43	(Argentina) Franco Colapinto	Alpine-Renault	0	Transmission	PL^{1}	

Notes

- ^1 – Franco Colapinto did not start the race due to a gearbox issue. He was required to start from the pit lane.

== Championship standings after the race ==
Drivers' Championship standings

Pos.	Driver	Points
1	(Australia) Oscar Piastri	234
2	(United Kingdom) Lando Norris	226
3	(Netherlands) Max Verstappen	165
4	(United Kingdom) George Russell	147
5	(Monaco) Charles Leclerc	119

Constructors' Championship standings

Pos.	Constructor	Points
1	(United Kingdom) McLaren-Mercedes	460
2	(Italy) Ferrari	222
3	(Germany) Mercedes	210
4	(Austria) Red Bull Racing-Honda RBPT	172
5	(United Kingdom) Williams-Mercedes	59

- Note: Only the top five positions are included for both sets of standings.

== See also ==
- 2025 Silverstone Formula 2 round
- 2025 Silverstone Formula 3 round

Previous race: 2025 Austrian Grand Prix	FIA Formula One World Championship; 2025 season	Next race: 2025 Belgian Grand Prix
Previous race: 2024 British Grand Prix	British Grand Prix	Next race: 2026 British Grand Prix
