= 2024 Miami Grand Prix =

Formula One motor race

Race 6 of 24 in the 2024 Formula One World Championship
← Previous race	Next race →
- Layout of the Miami International Autodrome

Race details
- Date: May 5, 2024
- Official name: Formula 1 Crypto.com Miami Grand Prix 2024
- Location: Miami International Autodrome, Miami Gardens, Florida
- Course: Purpose-built temporary circuit
- Course length: 5.412 km (3.363 miles)
- Distance: 57 laps, 308.326 km (191.584 miles)
- Weather: Partly cloudy
- Attendance: 275,000

Pole position
Driver	(Netherlands) Max Verstappen	Red Bull Racing-Honda RBPT
- Time: 1:27.241

Fastest lap
Driver	(Australia) Oscar Piastri	McLaren-Mercedes
- Time: 1:30.634 on lap 43

Podium
First	(United Kingdom) Lando Norris	McLaren-Mercedes
Second	(Netherlands) Max Verstappen	Red Bull Racing-Honda RBPT
Third	(Monaco) Charles Leclerc	Ferrari

The 2024 Miami Grand Prix (officially known as the Formula 1 Crypto.com Miami Grand Prix 2024) was a Formula One motor race held on May 5, 2024, at the Miami International Autodrome in Miami Gardens, Florida. It was the sixth round of the 2024 Formula One World Championship and the second Grand Prix weekend of the season to utilise the sprint format.

Max Verstappen of Red Bull Racing won the sprint from pole position. He also took pole position for the main race, but finished second to Lando Norris of McLaren, who took his maiden Grand Prix win on his 110th race start after a second place in the previous Grand Prix. Charles Leclerc of Ferrari finished third. The race marked McLaren's first victory since Daniel Ricciardo won the 2021 Italian Grand Prix. The three-day race weekend was attended by 275,000 people, which set a new attendance record for the Miami Grand Prix.

Verstappen extended his points advantage in the World Drivers' Championship over teammate Sergio Pérez to 33 points. Red Bull extended their lead in the World Constructors' Championship to 62 points over Ferrari.

== Background ==
The event was held at the Miami International Autodrome in Miami Gardens for the third time in the circuit's history, across the weekend on May 3–5. The Grand Prix was the sixth round of the 2024 Formula One World Championship, the third running of the Miami Grand Prix, and the first time that it featured the sprint format.

=== Championship standings before the race ===
Going into the weekend, Max Verstappen led the Drivers' Championship with 110 points, 25 points ahead of his teammate Sergio Pérez in second, and 34 ahead of Charles Leclerc in third. Red Bull Racing, with 195 points, led the Constructors' Championship from Ferrari and McLaren, who were second and third with 151 and 96 points, respectively.

=== Entrants ===
The drivers and teams were the same as the season entry list with no additional stand-in drivers for the race.

=== Tyre choices ===
Tyre supplier Pirelli brought the C2, C3, and C4 tyre compounds (the middle three in their range), designated hard, medium, and soft, respectively, for teams to use at the event.

=== Penalties ===
Daniel Ricciardo of RB carried a three-place grid penalty for the main race for overtaking Nico Hülkenberg of Haas under safety car conditions at the preceding Chinese Grand Prix.

== Practice ==
The only free practice session was held on May 3, 2024, at 12:30 local time (UTC−4), and was topped by Max Verstappen of Red Bull Racing ahead of Oscar Piastri of McLaren and Carlos Sainz Jr. of Ferrari. A red flag was called early into the session when the Ferrari of Charles Leclerc spun out in turn 16 and was unable to move. Following the session, Aston Martin was fined €400 after Lance Stroll exceeded the pit lane speed limit by 3.5 km/h (2.2 mph) over the set limit of 80 km/h (50 mph).

== Sprint qualifying ==
Sprint qualifying was held on May 3, 2024, at 16:30 local time (UTC−4), and determined the starting grid order for the sprint.

=== Sprint qualifying report ===
During the first segment (SQ1), the Sauber of Valtteri Bottas nearly collided with Oscar Piastri of McLaren as he was starting his flying lap. The incident was investigated by the stewards after the sprint qualifying session. Alexander Albon of Williams had his initial track time, that placed him in 16th, deleted for track limits, dropping him down to 20th. In the second segment, Mercedes was investigated for pit lane infringement after team personnel were seen without protective gear as Lewis Hamilton was entering the pit lane. The stewards took no further actions. In SQ3, drivers began running soft tyres with the Haas of Nico Hülkenberg making his first lap in the remaining four minutes of the segment.

In SQ1 and SQ2, Lando Norris of McLaren, whose car received upgrades, set the fastest lap in both sessions. However, Max Verstappen of Red Bull Racing, who found difficulties in his tyres, took pole position and was joined by Charles Leclerc of Ferrari in the grid's front row. Verstappen's teammate Sergio Pérez qualified in third with Daniel Ricciardo of RB joining him in fourth, the team’s best result for the season. After performing well in the first two segments, Norris qualified ninth. Bottas was given a three-place grid penalty for the sprint for impeding Piastri, dropping him to 20th from 18th in the starting grid. Albon, who qualified 20th, was required to start from the pit lane due to suspension changes during parc fermé.

=== Sprint qualifying classification ===
Pos.	No.	Driver	Constructor	Qualifying times			Sprint grid
Pos.	No.	Driver	Constructor	SQ1	SQ2	SQ3	Sprint grid
1	1	(Netherlands) Max Verstappen	Red Bull Racing-Honda RBPT	1:28.194	1:28.001	1:27.641	1
2	16	(Monaco) Charles Leclerc	Ferrari	1:28.537	1:27.977	1:27.749	2
3	11	(Mexico) Sergio Pérez	Red Bull Racing-Honda RBPT	1:28.681	1:27.865	1:27.876	3
4	3	(Australia) Daniel Ricciardo	RB-Honda RBPT	1:28.700	1:28.122	1:28.044	4
5	55	(Spain) Carlos Sainz Jr.	Ferrari	1:28.435	1:28.262	1:28.103	5
6	81	(Australia) Oscar Piastri	McLaren-Mercedes	1:28.056	1:28.163	1:28.161	6
7	18	(Canada) Lance Stroll	Aston Martin Aramco-Mercedes	1:28.807	1:28.323	1:28.375	7
8	14	(Spain) Fernando Alonso	Aston Martin Aramco-Mercedes	1:28.192	1:28.189	1:28.419	8
9	4	(United Kingdom) Lando Norris	McLaren-Mercedes	1:27.939	1:27.597	1:28.472	9
10	27	(Germany) Nico Hülkenberg	Haas-Ferrari	1:29.040	1:28.330	1:28.476	10
11	63	(United Kingdom) George Russell	Mercedes	1:28.387	1:28.343	N/A	11
12	44	(United Kingdom) Lewis Hamilton	Mercedes	1:28.736	1:28.371	N/A	12
13	31	(France) Esteban Ocon	Alpine-Renault	1:28.873	1:28.379	N/A	13
14	20	(Denmark) Kevin Magnussen	Haas-Ferrari	1:28.377	1:28.614	N/A	14
15	22	(Japan) Yuki Tsunoda	RB-Honda RBPT	1:28.687	No time	N/A	15
16	10	(France) Pierre Gasly	Alpine-Renault	1:29.185	N/A	N/A	16
17	24	(China) Zhou Guanyu	Kick Sauber-Ferrari	1:29.267	N/A	N/A	17
18	77	(Finland) Valtteri Bottas	Kick Sauber-Ferrari	1:29.360	N/A	N/A	19^{a}
19	2	(United States) Logan Sargeant	Williams-Mercedes	1:29.551	N/A	N/A	18
20	23	(Thailand) Alexander Albon	Williams-Mercedes	1:29.858	N/A	N/A	PL^{b}
107% time: 1:34.094

Notes

- ^a – Valtteri Bottas received a three-place grid penalty for the sprint for impeding Oscar Piastri in SQ1.
- ^b – Alexander Albon qualified 20th, but was required to start the sprint from the pit lane as his car was modified during parc fermé conditions.

== Sprint ==
The sprint was held on May 4, 2024, at 12:00 local time (UTC−4), and was run for 19 laps.

=== Sprint report ===
Before grid formation in the pit lane, Esteban Ocon collided into the Ferrari of Charles Leclerc, forcing a front wing change on the Alpine. Ocon was given a ten-second penalty and one penalty point for unsafe release. At the start of the race, going into turn one, Lando Norris retired from the race after receiving terminal damage from a three-car collision involving Lewis Hamilton, Fernando Alonso, and Lance Stroll. Alonso's Aston Martin contacted into Norris's McLaren, requiring a change of the front wing, while Stroll retired from damage on his car. No further actions was taken by the stewards for Hamilton, Alonso, and Stroll after the incident. Norris was fined €50,000 for returning to the pit lane during a live track, half of which is to be suspended unless a similar incident occurs in future races. Prior to the incident, Daniel Ricciardo moved up to third place after Sergio Pérez locked up into turn 1 while Kevin Magnussen moved from 14th to 8th on the grid. Under the safety car, Ocon served his penalty.

On lap five, Pérez retook third place from Ricciardo using DRS down the straight and into turn 11. Magnussen was given a ten-second penalty for leaving the track and gaining an advantage during his battle for eighth place with Hamilton. In the following laps, Magnussen would receive an additional two ten-second penalties and a five-second penalty for exceeding track limits, with a black and white flag given on the third occasion after multiple warnings, during his defence against the Mercedes. Hamilton managed to finish the race in eighth after overtaking Magnussen and managing to defend from Yuki Tsunoda. Hamilton received a twenty-second time penalty, converted from a drive-through penalty, for speeding in the pit lane during the safety car period, allowing Tsunoda to finish in the points. Max Verstappen, who achieved the fastest lap and led all laps, won the sprint ahead of Charles Leclerc of Ferrari and his Red Bull Racing teammate Pérez. Ricciardo finished in fourth, earning his first points of the season.

=== Sprint classification ===
Pos.	No.	Driver	Constructor	Laps	Time/Retired	Grid	Points
1	1	(Netherlands) Max Verstappen	Red Bull Racing-Honda RBPT	19	31:31.383	1	8
2	16	(Monaco) Charles Leclerc	Ferrari	19	+3.371	2	7
3	11	(Mexico) Sergio Pérez	Red Bull Racing-Honda RBPT	19	+5.095	3	6
4	3	(Australia) Daniel Ricciardo	RB-Honda RBPT	19	+14.971	4	5
5	55	(Spain) Carlos Sainz Jr.	Ferrari	19	+15.222	5	4
6	81	(Australia) Oscar Piastri	McLaren-Mercedes	19	+15.750	6	3
7	27	(Germany) Nico Hülkenberg	Haas-Ferrari	19	+22.054	10	2
8	22	(Japan) Yuki Tsunoda	RB-Honda RBPT	19	+29.816	15	1
9	10	(France) Pierre Gasly	Alpine-Renault	19	+31.880	16	
10	2	(United States) Logan Sargeant	Williams-Mercedes	19	+34.355	18	
11	24	(China) Zhou Guanyu	Kick Sauber-Ferrari	19	+35.078	17	
12	63	(United Kingdom) George Russell	Mercedes	19	+35.755	11	
13	23	(Thailand) Alexander Albon	Williams-Mercedes	19	+36.086	PL	
14	77	(Finland) Valtteri Bottas	Kick Sauber-Ferrari	19	+36.892	19	
15	31	(France) Esteban Ocon	Alpine-Renault	19	+37.740	13	
16	44	(United Kingdom) Lewis Hamilton	Mercedes	19	+49.347^{a}	12	
17	14	(Spain) Fernando Alonso	Aston Martin Aramco-Mercedes	19	+59.409	8	
18	20	(Denmark) Kevin Magnussen	Haas-Ferrari	19	+1:06.303^{b}	14	
Ret	18	(Canada) Lance Stroll	Aston Martin Aramco-Mercedes	1	Collision	7	
Ret	4	(United Kingdom) Lando Norris	McLaren-Mercedes	0	Collision	9	
Fastest lap: (Netherlands) Max Verstappen (Red Bull Racing-Honda RBPT) – 1:30.415 (lap 4)

Notes

- ^a – Lewis Hamilton finished eighth, but received a drive-through penalty converted into a twenty-second time penalty for speeding in the pit lane.
- ^b – Kevin Magnussen finished tenth, but received three ten-second time penalties and one five-second time penalty. The first three for leaving the track and gaining an advantage and the other for exceeding track limits.

== Qualifying ==
Qualifying was held on May 4, 2024, at 16:00 local time (UTC−4), and determined the starting grid order for the main race.

=== Qualifying report ===
Max Verstappen of Red Bull Racing took pole position after setting the fastest time in both Q1 and Q3 (the first and third segments respectively). Charles Leclerc of Ferrari joined him in the grid's front row ahead of teammate Carlos Sainz Jr. in third. Zhou Guanyu was issued a warning for forming a queue in the pit lane at the start of the first session, which was investigated after the segment. Daniel Ricciardo, who finished fourth in the sprint with RB, was eliminated in 18th position after struggling to find grip in his tyres in his flying lap. Ricciardo was imposed a three-place grid penalty from the previous race, dropping him down to 20th. Double yellow flags were called during the second session after Alexander Albon went wide on turn 17 in his Williams, reporting damage to his tyres soon after. In the third session, a potential impeding incident involving Sainz and Nico Hülkenberg was noted, although it was announced there was to be no further investigation. Verstappen earned his seventh consecutive pole, the first driver to do so since Lewis Hamilton in 2015, and the second driver to take the first six poles in a season since Alain Prost in 1993.

=== Qualifying classification ===
Pos.	No.	Driver	Constructor	Qualifying times			Final grid
Pos.	No.	Driver	Constructor	Q1	Q2	Q3	Final grid
1	1	(Netherlands) Max Verstappen	Red Bull Racing-Honda RBPT	1:27.689	1:27.566	1:27.241	1
2	16	(Monaco) Charles Leclerc	Ferrari	1:28.081	1:27.533	1:27.382	2
3	55	(Spain) Carlos Sainz Jr.	Ferrari	1:27.937	1:27.941	1:27.455	3
4	11	(Mexico) Sergio Pérez	Red Bull Racing-Honda RBPT	1:27.772	1:27.839	1:27.460	4
5	4	(United Kingdom) Lando Norris	McLaren-Mercedes	1:27.913	1:27.871	1:27.594	5
6	81	(Australia) Oscar Piastri	McLaren-Mercedes	1:28.032	1:27.721	1:27.675	6
7	63	(United Kingdom) George Russell	Mercedes	1:28.159	1:28.095	1:28.067	7
8	44	(United Kingdom) Lewis Hamilton	Mercedes	1:28.167	1:27.697	1:28.107	8
9	27	(Germany) Nico Hülkenberg	Haas-Ferrari	1:28.383	1:28.200	1:28.146	9
10	22	(Japan) Yuki Tsunoda	RB-Honda RBPT	1:28.324	1:28.167	1:28.192	10
11	18	(Canada) Lance Stroll	Aston Martin Aramco-Mercedes	1:28.177	1:28.222	N/A	11
12	10	(France) Pierre Gasly	Alpine-Renault	1:27.976	1:28.324	N/A	12
13	31	(France) Esteban Ocon	Alpine-Renault	1:28.209	1:28.371	N/A	13
14	23	(Thailand) Alexander Albon	Williams-Mercedes	1:28.343	1:28.413	N/A	14
15	14	(Spain) Fernando Alonso	Aston Martin Aramco-Mercedes	1:28.453	1:28.427	N/A	15
16	77	(Finland) Valtteri Bottas	Kick Sauber-Ferrari	1:28.463	N/A	N/A	16
17	2	(United States) Logan Sargeant	Williams-Mercedes	1:28.487	N/A	N/A	17
18	3	(Australia) Daniel Ricciardo	RB-Honda RBPT	1:28.617	N/A	N/A	20^{a}
19	20	(Denmark) Kevin Magnussen	Haas-Ferrari	1:28.619	N/A	N/A	18
20	24	(China) Zhou Guanyu	Kick Sauber-Ferrari	1:28.824	N/A	N/A	19
107% time: 1:33.827

Notes

- ^a – Daniel Ricciardo received a three-place grid penalty for the main race for overtaking Nico Hülkenberg under safety car conditions at the previous round.

== Race ==
The race was held on May 5, 2024, at 16:00 local time (UTC−4), and was run for 57 laps.

=== Race report ===
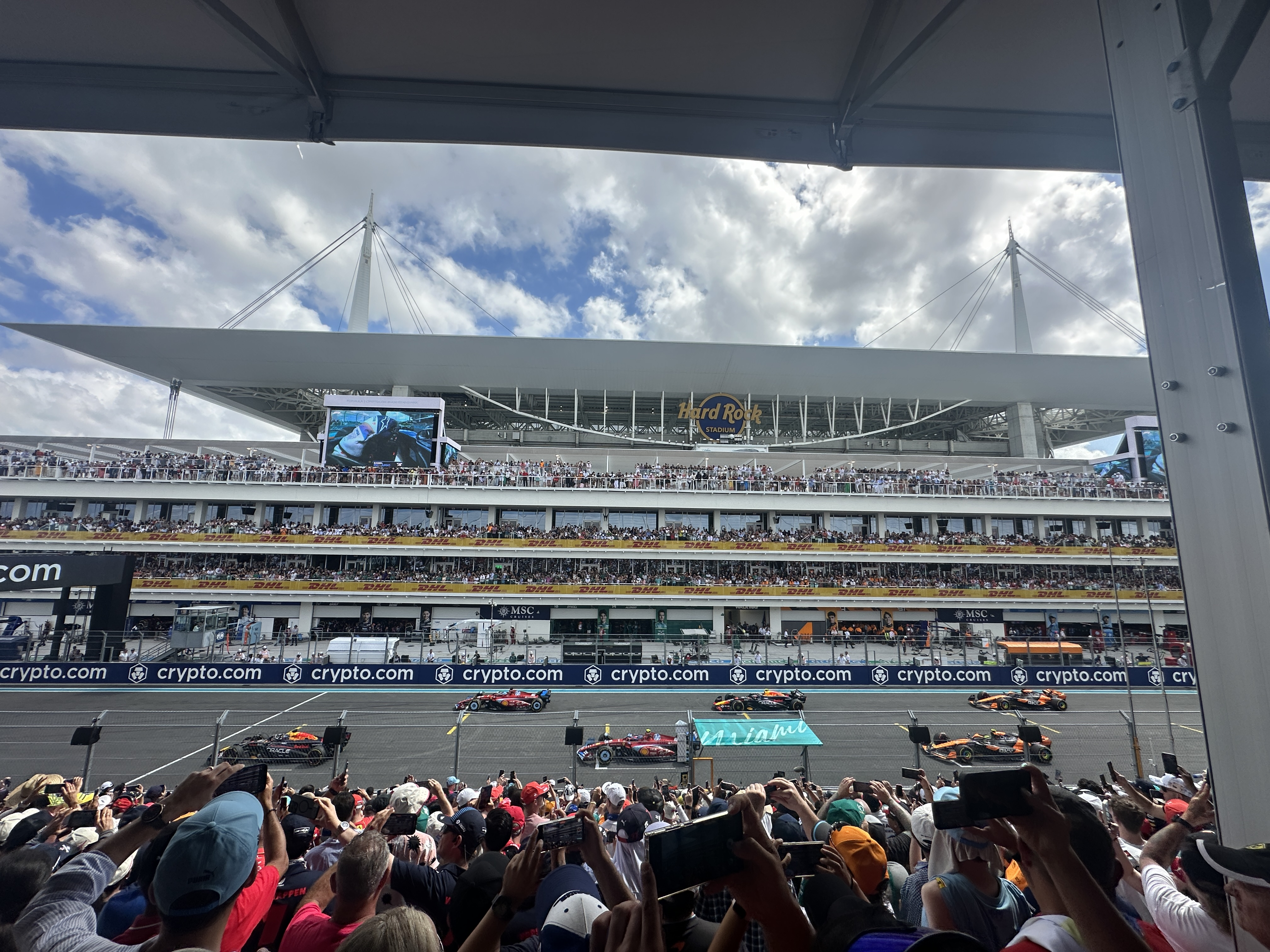
The first three rows of the grid ahead of the race start

Daniel Ricciardo, who qualified eighteenth, served his three-place grid drop from the previous Chinese Grand Prix, dropping him to last. As the race began, Red Bull Racing polesitter Max Verstappen kept the lead into turn one as his teammate Sergio Pérez, who had potentially jumped the start, had a major lock up and had a near-miss moment with not only Verstappen, but Ferrari drivers Charles Leclerc and Carlos Sainz Jr. While this was occurring, Oscar Piastri of McLaren saw the opportunity to slide from sixth to third. Verstappen would create a large gap to Leclerc as Alpine drivers Esteban Ocon and Pierre Gasly engaged in a wheel-to-wheel battle that Gasly emerged victorious from, while Nico Hülkenberg drove his Haas past Mercedes's Lewis Hamilton to take seventh. Piastri soon overtook Leclerc with DRS, and Hamilton briefly overtook Hülkenberg before he locked up. Hamilton overtook Hülkenberg once again briefly afterward, with the latter soon losing position to George Russell.

Soon, the Williams and Sauber drivers went in for their pit stops; Hülkenberg joined them in the pits. More drivers came into the pit lane soon afterwards, with Pérez the first of the frontrunners to stop. He was joined by Leclerc, with the hard being the favored tire compound. At that point, Verstappen had created a large gap, but he made a mistake over the turn fourteen-fifteen chicane and struck a bollard. The bollard followed his front wing until it was released at turn sixteen, forcing a brief virtual safety car period. Running over the kerbs resulted in damage to Verstappen's floor. It was during this time that Ocon, Fernando Alonso and Kevin Magnussen made their pit stops, with Verstappen making his immediately after the virtual safety car period had ended. After this, Hamilton took the mediums, and Russell the hards. Piastri assumed the lead of the race with Sainz and Lando Norris behind him. Shortly afterward, Piastri and Sainz pitted, which gave the race lead to Norris.

Soon, an incident with Magnussen saw Logan Sargeant hitting the wall and retiring with terminal damage. Magnussen, who received a penalty, had to go to the pit lane for repairs. This incident led to a full safety car period, which benefited Norris as he switched his tyres, giving him a tyre advantage for the restart. Yuki Tsunoda, Zhou Guanyu and Ricciardo also changed their tyres during this period. Verstappen was picked up by the safety car as Norris led the Grand Prix ahead of Verstappen and Leclerc. Ocon was in tenth (maintaining this position until the end), which ultimately earned the first point for Alpine of the season.

The safety car returned to the pit lane on lap 32. During the restart, Norris came under pressure from Verstappen and took a defensive stance. Verstappen lost time to Norris, who opened a gap. In the meantime, Sainz attacked Piastri, causing front wing damage that put the Australian out of the points. However, Sainz received a five-second penalty following the race. Following a front wing replacement, Piastri tried to recover to the points, but suffered from lock ups. He was told by his race engineer to tone down his aggression, as another safety car would endanger Norris's lead. Piastri would set the fastest lap of the race. There were no other major incidents during the closing stages of the race apart from Lance Stroll going off the track to try to overtake Alexander Albon, with Stroll being awarded a ten-second time penalty.

Norris completed the last few laps to take victory ahead of Verstappen and Leclerc. His maiden Formula One victory, after 110 race starts, was McLaren's first since the 2021 Italian Grand Prix. This was the first victory for a British driver, or a Mercedes-powered team, since the 2022 São Paulo Grand Prix, which was won by Russell driving for Mercedes. Having achieved 15 podiums prior to reaching the top step of the podium, the win meant Norris tied the record jointly held by Patrick Depailler, Mika Häkkinen, Eddie Irvine and Jean Alesi for the most podiums scored before taking a maiden Grand Prix win. This was also Norris's first win in any competitive race in any category for over six years since winning the feature race at the 2018 Bahrain Formula 2 round. Norris's race engineer Will Joseph said the victory allowed himself, Norris and the whole McLaren team to finally move on from their "haunting" experience at the 2021 Russian Grand Prix, where Norris led most of the race only to lose out following a late heavy rain shower where he decided against changing to wet-weather tyres.

Despite not winning the race, Verstappen extended his points advantage in the World Drivers' Championship over teammate Sergio Pérez to 33 points. Leclerc remained in third, closing to within five points of Pérez. Norris' win elevated him to fourth in the standings with 83 points, tied with Carlos Sainz Jr. (Note: Norris was classified ahead of Sainz courtesy of the countback system. Both drivers had secured one victory. Norris had more second places than Sainz, meaning that Norris was placed higher in the championship standings.) Red Bull extended their lead in the World Constructors' Championship to 62 points over Ferrari, with McLaren a further 63 points adrift in third.

=== Race classification ===
Pos.	No.	Driver	Constructor	Laps	Time/Retired	Grid	Points
1	4	(United Kingdom) Lando Norris	McLaren-Mercedes	57	1:30:49.876	5	25
2	1	(Netherlands) Max Verstappen	Red Bull Racing-Honda RBPT	57	+7.612	1	18
3	16	(Monaco) Charles Leclerc	Ferrari	57	+9.920	2	15
4	11	(Mexico) Sergio Pérez	Red Bull Racing-Honda RBPT	57	+14.650	4	12
5	55	(Spain) Carlos Sainz Jr.	Ferrari	57	+16.407^{a}	3	10
6	44	(United Kingdom) Lewis Hamilton	Mercedes	57	+16.585	8	8
7	22	(Japan) Yuki Tsunoda	RB-Honda RBPT	57	+26.185	10	6
8	63	(United Kingdom) George Russell	Mercedes	57	+34.789	7	4
9	14	(Spain) Fernando Alonso	Aston Martin Aramco-Mercedes	57	+37.107	15	2
10	31	(France) Esteban Ocon	Alpine-Renault	57	+39.746	13	1
11	27	(Germany) Nico Hülkenberg	Haas-Ferrari	57	+40.789	9	
12	10	(France) Pierre Gasly	Alpine-Renault	57	+44.958	12	
13	81	(Australia) Oscar Piastri	McLaren-Mercedes	57	+49.756	6	
14	24	(China) Zhou Guanyu	Kick Sauber-Ferrari	57	+49.979	19	
15	3	(Australia) Daniel Ricciardo	RB-Honda RBPT	57	+50.956	20	
16	77	(Finland) Valtteri Bottas	Kick Sauber-Ferrari	57	+52.356	16	
17	18	(Canada) Lance Stroll	Aston Martin Aramco-Mercedes	57	+55.173^{b}	11	
18	23	(Thailand) Alexander Albon	Williams-Mercedes	57	+1:16.091	14	
19	20	(Denmark) Kevin Magnussen	Haas-Ferrari	57	+1:24.683^{c}	18	
Ret	2	(United States) Logan Sargeant	Williams-Mercedes	27	Collision	17	
Fastest lap: (Australia) Oscar Piastri (McLaren-Mercedes) – 1:30.643 (lap 43)

Notes

- ^a – Carlos Sainz Jr. finished fourth on track, but received a post-race five-second time penalty for causing a collision with Oscar Piastri.
- ^b – Lance Stroll finished 13th, but received a ten-second time penalty for leaving the track and gaining an advantage.
- ^c – Kevin Magnussen finished 18th, but received a ten-second time penalty for causing a collision with Logan Sargeant. He also received a post-race drive-through penalty converted into a twenty-second time penalty for not changing tyres while entering the pit lane during safety car conditions.

== Championship standings after the race ==
Drivers' Championship standings

	Pos.	Driver	Points
	1	(Netherlands) Max Verstappen	136
	2	(Mexico) Sergio Pérez	103
	3	(Monaco) Charles Leclerc	98
1	4	(United Kingdom) Lando Norris	83
1	5	(Spain) Carlos Sainz Jr.	83

Constructors' Championship standings

Pos.	Constructor	Points
1	(Austria) Red Bull Racing-Honda RBPT	239
2	(Italy) Ferrari	187
3	(United Kingdom) McLaren-Mercedes	124
4	(Germany) Mercedes	64
5	(United Kingdom) Aston Martin Aramco-Mercedes	42

- Note: Only the top five positions are included for both sets of standings.

== Notes ==
Previous race: 2024 Chinese Grand Prix	FIA Formula One World Championship; 2024 season	Next race: 2024 Emilia Romagna Grand Prix
Previous race: 2023 Miami Grand Prix	Miami Grand Prix	Next race: 2025 Miami Grand Prix
