= Racing Bulls =

Motorsports team

(Italy) Racing Bulls-Red Bull Ford
- Full name: Visa Cash App Racing Bulls Formula One Team
- Base: Faenza, Italy; Milton Keynes, Buckinghamshire, England
- Team principal(s): Peter Bayer (Chief Executive Officer); Alan Permane (Team Principal)
- Chief Technical Officer: Tim Goss
- Technical director: Dan Fallows
- Website: visacashapprb.com
- Previous name: RB/Scuderia AlphaTauri

2026 Formula One World Championship
- Race drivers: 30. (New Zealand) Liam Lawson; 41. (United Kingdom) Arvid Lindblad; 22. (Japan) Yuki Tsunoda
- Test driver(s): 22. (Japan) Yuki Tsunoda; 90. (Japan) Ayumu Iwasa; 91. (Bulgaria) Nikola Tsolov
- Chassis: VCARB 03
- Engine: Red Bull Ford DM01
- Tyres: Pirelli

Formula One World Championship career
- First entry: 2024 Bahrain Grand Prix
- Last entry: 2026 São Paulo Grand Prix
- Races entered: 68 (68 starts)
- Engines: Honda RBPT, Red Bull Ford
- Constructors' Championships: 0
- Drivers' Championships: 0
- Race victories: 0
- Podiums: 1
- Points: 252
- Pole positions: 0
- Fastest laps: 1
- 2025 position: 6th (92 pts)

Racing Bulls S.p.A., competing as Visa Cash App Racing Bulls Formula One Team (shortened to Racing Bulls or VCARB), is an Italian Formula One racing team and constructor that has been competing since the 2024 season. It is one of two Formula One constructors owned by Austrian conglomerate Red Bull GmbH, the other being Red Bull Racing. The team is based in Faenza and has a base in Milton Keynes near its sister team.

Known as Scuderia Toro Rosso from 2006 to 2019 and Scuderia AlphaTauri from 2020 to 2023, the team was rebranded to RB for the 2024 season, and then switched to Racing Bulls in 2025.

The current CEO is Peter Bayer, and the team principal is Alan Permane. At the start of the 2024 season, the team retained incumbent drivers Daniel Ricciardo (Note: Ricciardo had already replaced Nyck de Vries at AlphaTauri during the 2023 season.) and Yuki Tsunoda from when it was known as AlphaTauri; Ricciardo was dropped after the 2024 Singapore Grand Prix and was replaced with Red Bull junior and reserve driver Liam Lawson. (Note: Lawson had already deputised for an injured Ricciardo during the 2023 season.) Lawson was promoted to the main Red Bull team for 2025, with Formula 2 graduate Isack Hadjar taking his place at Racing Bulls. Lawson was subsequently dropped from the Red Bull team after two races and returned to Racing Bulls, with Tsunoda promoted to the senior team. The team scored their first podium as Racing Bulls at the 2025 Dutch Grand Prix.

== Origins ==
The team traces its roots to Minardi, which competed in Formula One from 1985 to 2005, before being bought by Red Bull in 2006 to become the junior team to Red Bull Racing. From 2006 to 2019, it competed as "Toro Rosso" and was known for housing future Red Bull talent, such as future four-time World Champion Sebastian Vettel, former Scuderia Ferrari driver and current Williams Racing driver Carlos Sainz Jr., and four-time World Champion Max Verstappen. In addition, Toro Rosso had previously employed 2023–24 driver Daniel Ricciardo as part of its line-up in 2012 and 2013.

For the 2020 Formula One World Championship, Toro Rosso was rebranded to "AlphaTauri" in order to promote Red Bull's AlphaTauri fashion brand. According to Franz Tost and Helmut Marko, the rebrand to Scuderia AlphaTauri also acknowledged that it had transitioned from Red Bull Racing's junior team to its sister team.

The team was rebranded to Visa Cash App RB F1 Team for the 2024 season, shortened to the acronymised "VCARB". The new name was widely criticised by fans and the media, with Edd Straw of The Race calling it "the worst team name in Formula 1 history" and "an embarrassment to Red Bull and Formula 1 as a whole", arguing that the name "RB" lacks "personality, identity and ambition", could easily be confused with Red Bull Racing, and exists solely to force the sponsors to be mentioned more often. For the 2025 season, the team was entered as "Racing Bulls", discontinuing the usage of the "RB" initialism.

== Racing history ==
=== Works Honda RBPT engines (2024–2025) ===
==== 2024 ====
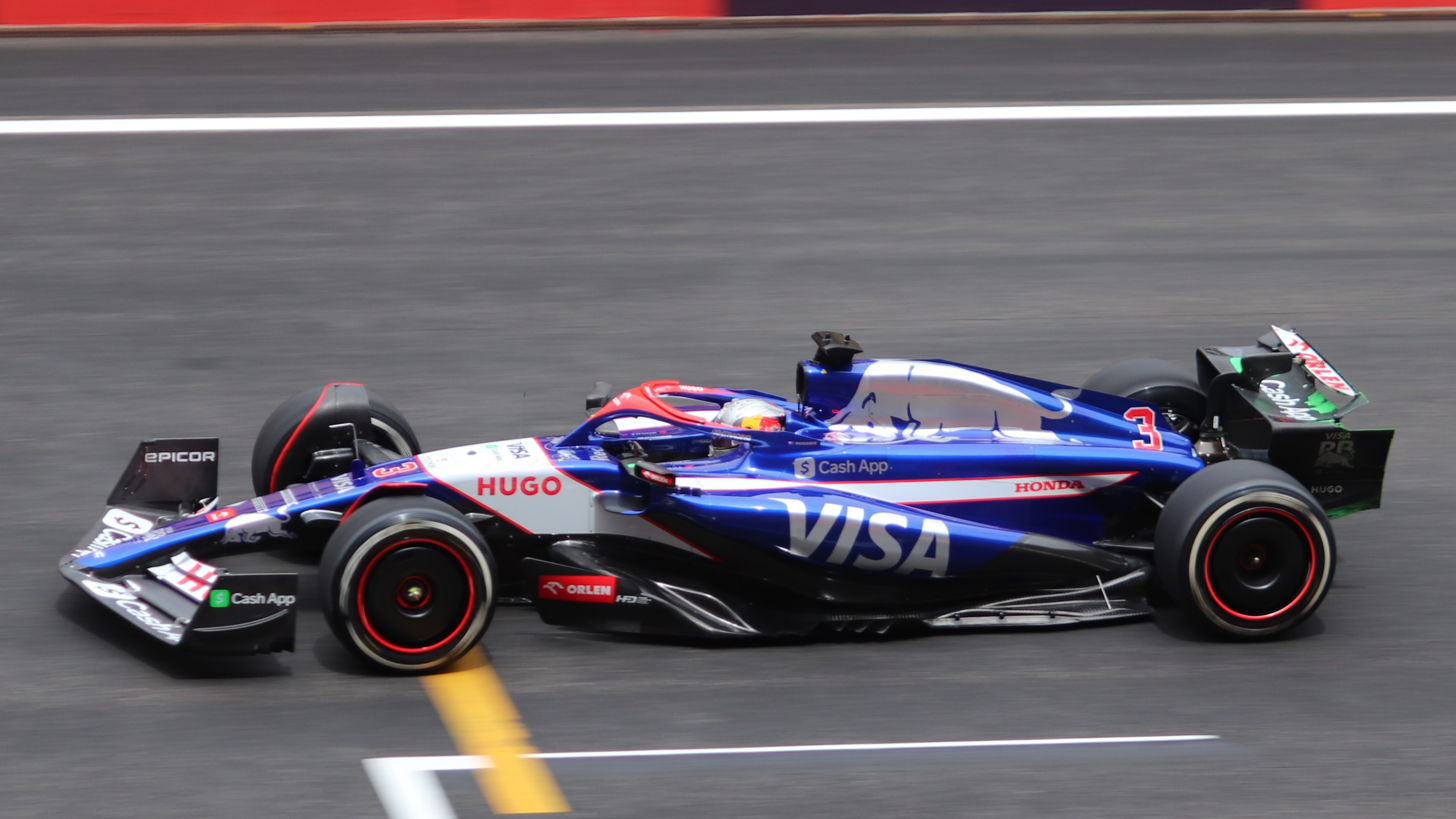
The RB VCARB 01 of Ricciardo at the 2024 Chinese Grand Prix

RB entered the 2024 F1 season with drivers Daniel Ricciardo and Yuki Tsunoda. The team continued using Honda RBPT power units, having used Honda-designed power units since the 2018 season when it was named Scuderia Toro Rosso.

Tsunoda bagged the team's first points in Australia, a season best P7, later matched in São Paulo and Miami. Also in Miami, Ricciardo secured a season best P4, though this was only a sprint race, and hence got just 5 points. Tsunoda's P8 in the sprint made the Miami Sprint their first double points of the season. In the 2024 Chinese Grand Prix, the team suffered a double retirement, caused by Haas's Kevin Magnussen crashing into Tsunoda and Ricciardo's rear being struck by Lance Stroll. Both drivers suffered major damage to their diffusers, with Ricciardo in particular being forced to retire a few laps later. Tsunoda suffered terminal rear-right damage and retired on the spot.

Ahead of the United States Grand Prix, Ricciardo was dropped and replaced by reserve driver Liam Lawson for the remainder of the season. Lawson immediately impressed, scoring points with a P9 finish in USGP. Later during the São Paulo Grand Prix, Tsunoda recorded his personal best qualifying by securing the P3 slot on the grid, which turned into a P7, and Lawson's P9 made it another double points finish. RB secured and overall 8th place finish in the Constructors' Championship with 46 points, to round off a mediocre campaign for the team.

==== 2025 ====
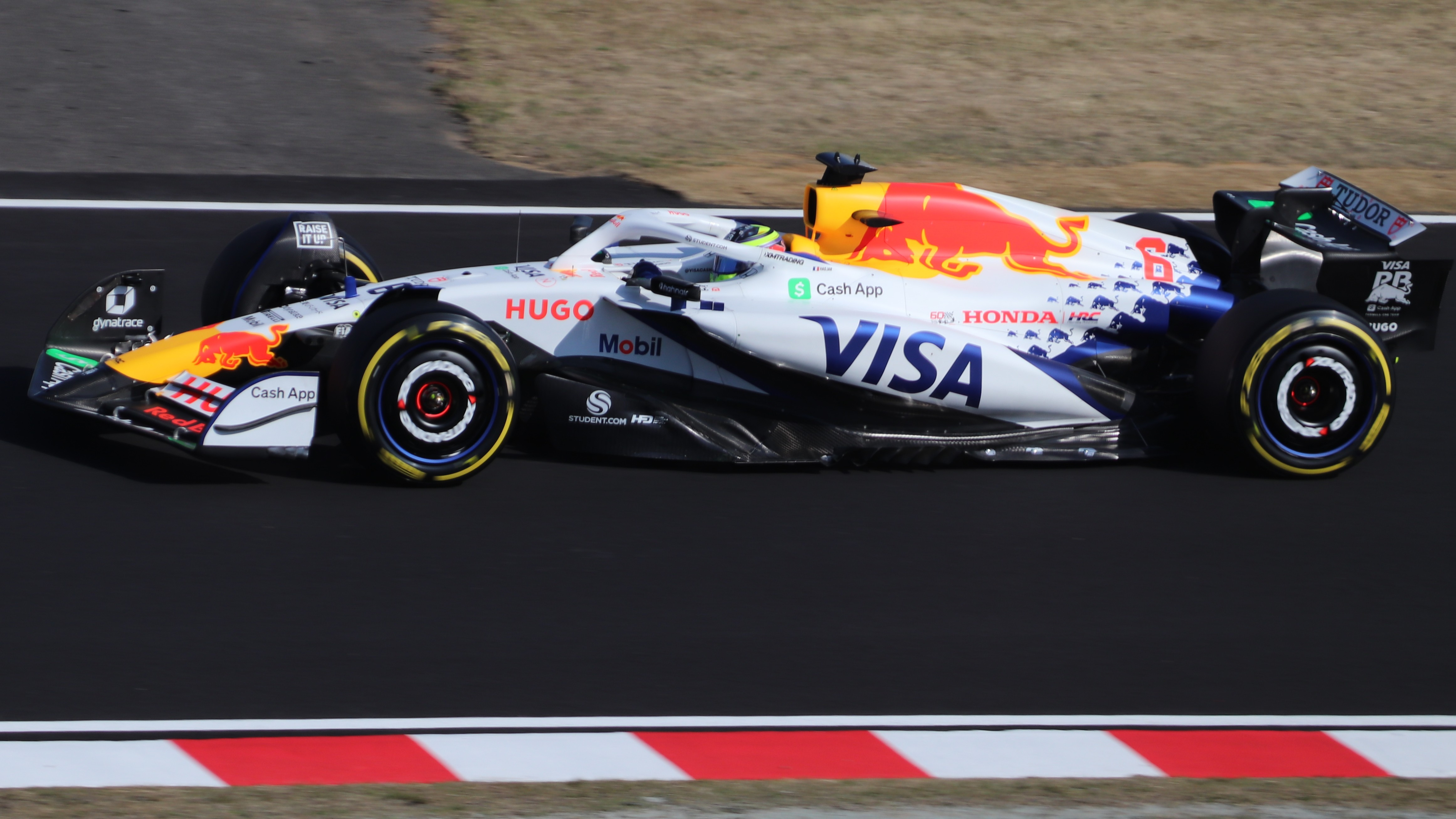
The RB VCARB 02 of Hadjar at the 2025 Japanese Grand Prix

Racing Bulls retained Tsunoda for the 2025 season, with Lawson promoted to Oracle Red Bull Racing to replace the outgoing Sergio Pérez with his place being taken by F2 graduate and Red Bull Junior driver, Isack Hadjar. However, Lawson returned to Racing Bulls after two disappointing Grands Prix with Red Bull, with Tsunoda being promoted up to the main team in his place ahead of the Japanese grand prix, where Isack Hadjar scored his first points. Hadjar had a consistent runs of points, which peaked with a P6 finish in Monaco, where Lawson's P8 made it the team's first double points. The team suffered a double DNF at the British Grand Prix due to collisions with other drivers.

At the 2025 Dutch Grand Prix, Hadjar managed to finish P3, for the team's 6th ever podium in history, their first as Racing Bulls and the last using Honda RBPT engines. This run of form continued when Lawson qualified a career best P3 at the Azerbaijan Grand Prix, which he converted to a career best P5 finish. More strong results and double points followed in Las Vegas and São Paulo. Racing Bulls ended the season with a 6th place finish in the Constructors' standings with 92 points, their best season to date. Hadjar was praised by many for his consistency, and Lawson also received praise for bouncing back strongly after his demotion from Red Bull.

=== Ford-badged RBPT engines (2026–present) ===
==== 2026 ====
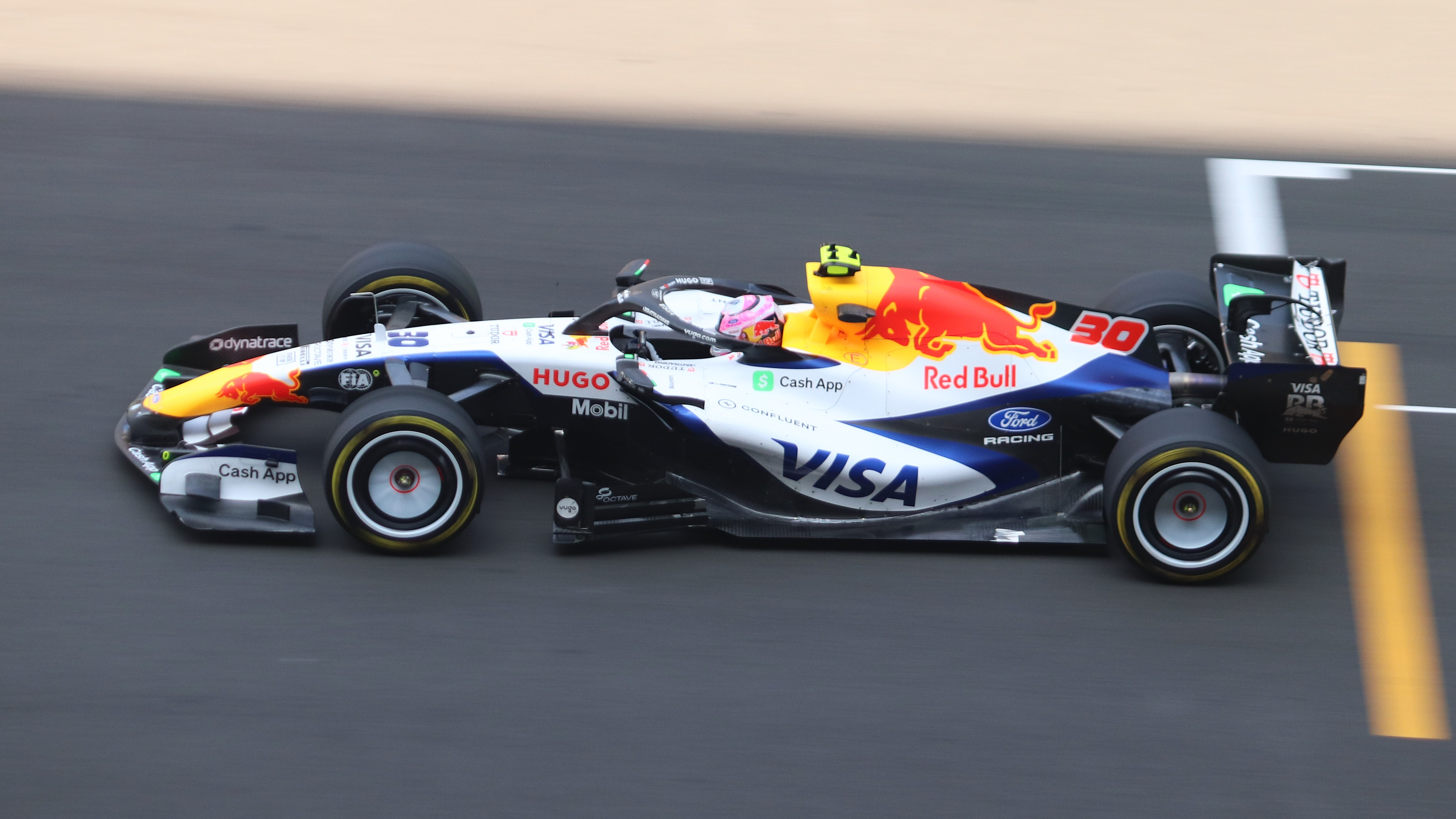
The RB VCARB 03 of Lawson at the 2026 Chinese Grand Prix

Racing Bulls and sister team Red Bull Racing decided to switch to Red Bull Ford Powertrains power units from 2026 onwards and thus concluded the eight-year long-standing alliance with Honda that powered the team since 2018 season under Scuderia Toro Rosso and Scuderia AlphaTauri brandings, and helping Ford return to Formula 1 for the first time since 2004. For the drivers, Racing Bulls retained Lawson, and signed Arvid Lindblad after a stellar campaign in F2, as Isack Hadjar was promoted to the main RedBull team.

Lindblad enjoyed a spectacular debut in Australia by finishing P8, scoring 4 points as Lawson was held back with a turbo issue. Lawson then finished 7th in both the sprint and the main race in China, followed by more points in Japan.

From the Monaco to the British Grand Prix, the team scored a record four successive double points finishes, ended by a P12 finish for Lawson in Belgium. Another double points finish in Hungary allowed the team to overtake Alpine for fifth place in the constructors' standings, the highest position held by the team during a season since they competed under the AlphaTauri name in 2020.

==== 2027 ====
On 12 November 2026, it was confirmed that Lawson and Lindblad would continue to drive for Racing Bulls in 2027.

== Complete Formula One results ==
Key

Key
Colour	Result
Gold	Winner
Silver	Second place
Bronze	Third place
Green	Other points position
Blue	Other classified position
Blue	Not classified, finished (NC)
Purple	Not classified, retired (Ret)
Red	Did not qualify (DNQ)
Black	Disqualified (DSQ)
White	Did not start (DNS)
White	Race cancelled (C)
Blank	Did not practice (DNP)
Blank	Excluded (EX)
Blank	Did not arrive (DNA)
Blank	Withdrawn (WD)
Blank	Did not enter (empty cell)
Annotation	Meaning
P	Pole position
F	Fastest lap
Superscript number	Points-scoring position in sprint

Year	Chassis	Engine	Tyres	Drivers	1	2	3	4	5	6	7	8	9	10	11	12	13	14	15	16	17	18	19	20	21	22	23	24	Points	WCC
2024	VCARB 01	Honda RBPTH002; 1.6 V6 t	P		BHR	SAU	AUS	JPN	CHN	MIA	EMI	MON	CAN	ESP	AUT	GBR	HUN	BEL	NED	ITA	AZE	SIN	USA	MXC	SAP	LVG	QAT	ABU	46	8th
2024	VCARB 01	Honda RBPTH002; 1.6 V6 t	P	(Australia) Daniel Ricciardo	13	16	12	Ret	Ret	15^{4}	13	12	8	15	9	13	12	10	12	13	13	18^{F}							46	8th
2024	VCARB 01	Honda RBPTH002; 1.6 V6 t	P	(New Zealand) Liam Lawson																			9	16	9	16	14	17†	46	8th
2024	VCARB 01	Honda RBPTH002; 1.6 V6 t	P	(Japan) Yuki Tsunoda	14	15	7	10	Ret	7^{8}	10	8	14	19	14	10	9	16	17	Ret	Ret	12	14	Ret	7	9	13	12	46	8th
2025	VCARB 02	Honda RBPTH003; 1.6 V6 t	P		AUS	CHN	JPN	BHR	SAU	MIA	EMI	MON	ESP	CAN	AUT	GBR	BEL	HUN	NED	ITA	AZE	SIN	USA	MXC	SAP	LVG	QAT	ABU	92	6th
2025	VCARB 02	Honda RBPTH003; 1.6 V6 t	P	(France) Isack Hadjar	DNS	11	8	13	10	11	9	6	7	16	12	Ret	20^{8}	11	3	10	10	11	16	13	8	6	18†	17	92	6th
2025	VCARB 02	Honda RBPTH003; 1.6 V6 t	P	(Japan) Yuki Tsunoda	12	16^{6}																							92	6th
2025	VCARB 02	Honda RBPTH003; 1.6 V6 t	P	(New Zealand) Liam Lawson			17	16	12	Ret	14	8	11	Ret	6	Ret	8	8	12	14	5	15	11	Ret	7	14	9	18	92	6th
2026	VCARB 03	Red Bull Ford DM01 1.6 V6 t	P		AUS	CHN	JPN	MIA	CAN	MON	BCN	AUT	GBR	BEL	HUN	NED	ITA	ESP	AZE	BHR	SIN	USA	MXC	SAP	LVG	QAT	ABU		114*	5th*
2026	VCARB 03	Red Bull Ford DM01 1.6 V6 t	P	(New Zealand) Liam Lawson	13	7^{7}	9	Ret	7	5	8	9	6^{8}	12	8				12	7	7^{5}	9	7	7					114*	5th*
2026	VCARB 03	Red Bull Ford DM01 1.6 V6 t	P	(United Kingdom) Arvid Lindblad	8	12	14	14	DNS^{8}	6	9	10	7	9	10	12	8	9	7	10	15	12	Ret	11					114*	5th*
2026	VCARB 03	Red Bull Ford DM01 1.6 V6 t	P	(Japan) Yuki Tsunoda												11	10	14											114*	5th*

† Did not finish, but was classified as he had completed more than 90% of the race distance.
* Season still in progress.
