= Alan Permane =

British engineer

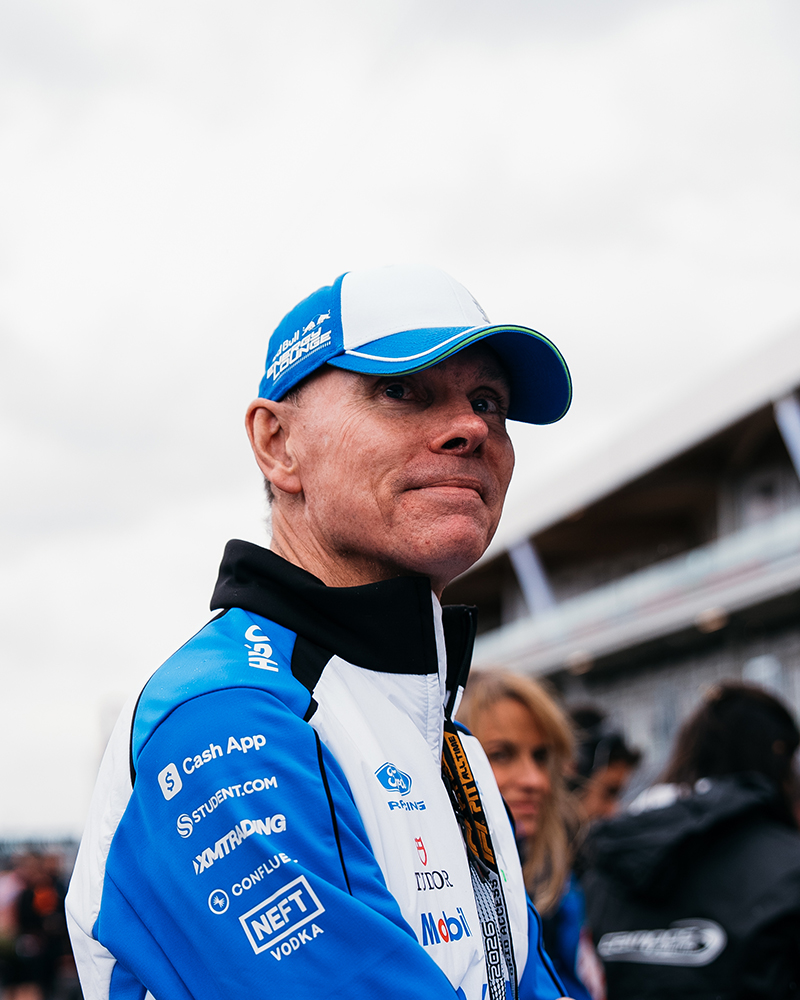
- Permane in 2026
- Born: 4 February 1967 (age 59); Walton-on-Thames, Surrey, England
- Citizenship: British
- Occupation: Engineer
- Known for: Formula One engineer
- Title: Team Principal of Racing Bulls

Alan Permane (born 4 February 1967) is a British Formula One engineer. He is the current Team Principal for Racing Bulls since 2025. Previously, he served as the Sporting Director, Chief Operating Officer, Chief Race Engineer for the Alpine F1 Team/Renault F1 Team and Racing Director for Racing Bulls.

== Career ==
Permane started his career in motorsport in 1989 as a test electronics engineer for the Benetton F1 team. He was promoted to a junior race engineer in 1996, working alongside Jean Alesi, and then subsequently became a race engineer from 1997 to 2006 for the Enstone outfit as the team became Renault F1, engineering drivers such as Jarno Trulli and Giancarlo Fisichella. In 2007 he became the chief race engineer for Renault F1 and in 2011 the Chief Operating Officer. In 2012 Permane became the Sporting Director for the team then called Lotus F1 a position he retained as the team transitioned back into Renault F1 and then into Alpine F1 Team. On 28 July 2023, Permane was released by the team and his time with Alpine concluded after the Belgian Grand Prix.

Permane was announced to be joining the Visa Cash App RB F1 Team at the start of 2024 as racing director. He was appointed as Team Principal midway through the 2025 season, following the sacking of Christian Horner from Oracle Red Bull Racing (the senior Red Bull team) and the subsequent promotion of then-Racing Bulls Team Principal Laurent Mekies to the senior team.
