= Parc fermé =

Secure parking area at a race or rally

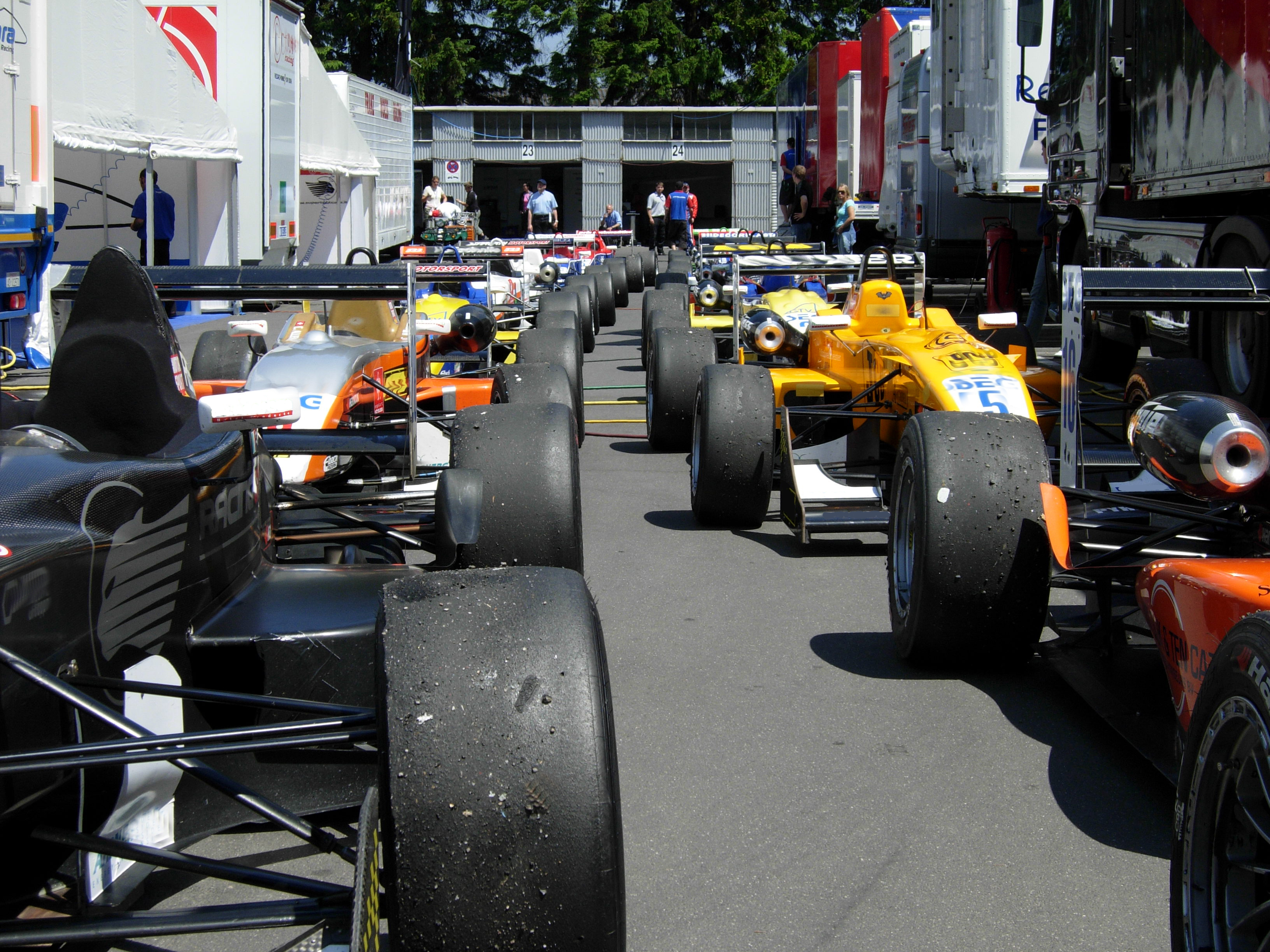
Formula 3 parc fermé.

Parc fermé, literally meaning "closed park" in French, is a secure area at a motor racing circuit where the cars are kept at some times during a race meeting in order to prevent modifications.

== Formula One ==
According to the FIA Formula One regulations (used since 2003), the area must be sufficiently large and secure so as to prevent unauthorised access to the cars, while allowing technical checks to take place. Cars must be placed in parc fermé within three and a half hours from the end of qualifying until five hours before the start of the race formation lap. Essentially, cars in this area must not be touched by anyone without express permission of the FIA stewards.

However, cars are put under "parc fermé conditions" from the time the cars exit the pits for qualifying until the start of the race formation lap. Under these conditions, only minor adjustments such as tyre changes, refuelling, bleeding of brakes and minor front wing adjustments are allowed. As such, teams cannot make major set-up changes between qualifying and race day. Violation of such rules usually means that the car has to start from the pit lane.

The only exception is due to a change in climatic conditions, where the Race Director will give teams permission to make appropriate changes to their cars, or in the case of serious accidents compromising the integrity of the car.

== Other uses ==
In duathlon (run–bike–run) and triathlon (swim–bike–run) competitions the parc fermé is a secure area where bikes are stored during the race. According to regulations the bikes can only be accessed by the athletes themselves, as any kind of outside help is prohibited in this sport.
