= 2025 Chinese Grand Prix =

Second round of the 2025 F1 season

Race 2 of 24 in the 2025 Formula One World Championship
← Previous race	Next race →
- Layout of the Shanghai International Circuit

Race details
- Date: 23 March 2025
- Official name: Formula 1 Heineken Chinese Grand Prix 2025
- Location: Shanghai International Circuit; Shanghai, China
- Course: Permanent racing facility
- Course length: 5.451 km (3.387 miles)
- Distance: 56 laps, 305.066 km (189.559 miles)
- Weather: Cloudy
- Attendance: 220,000

Pole position
Driver	(Australia) Oscar Piastri	McLaren-Mercedes
- Time: 1:30.641

Fastest lap
Driver	(United Kingdom) Lando Norris (Note: Lewis Hamilton originally set the fastest lap, but was later disqualified as the thickness of the plank assembly was below the minimum thickness required. Lando Norris, initially having the second-fastest lap, was recognised for setting the fastest lap of the race.)	McLaren-Mercedes
- Time: 1:35.454 on lap 53

Podium
First	(Australia) Oscar Piastri	McLaren-Mercedes
Second	(United Kingdom) Lando Norris	McLaren-Mercedes
Third	(United Kingdom) George Russell	Mercedes

The 2025 Chinese Grand Prix (officially known as the Formula 1 Heineken Chinese Grand Prix 2025) was a Formula One motor race that was held on 23 March 2025 at the Shanghai International Circuit in Shanghai, China. It was the second round of the 2025 Formula One World Championship and the first of six Grands Prix in the season to utilise the sprint format.

Lewis Hamilton in the Ferrari took sprint pole position and kept the lead to win the sprint ahead of Oscar Piastri (McLaren) and Red Bull driver Max Verstappen. Piastri took his maiden career pole position for the main race, ahead of George Russell driving for Mercedes and teammate Lando Norris.

In the main race, Piastri converted his pole position to a win ahead of teammate Norris and Russell. Following the race, Charles Leclerc, Lewis Hamilton and Pierre Gasly were disqualified from fifth, sixth and eleventh respectively. Leclerc and Gasly were disqualified due to their cars being underweight, whilst Hamilton was disqualified due to excessive plank wear.

The result meant that Norris extended his lead in the Drivers' Championship to eight points over Verstappen, with Russell a further point adrift in third. Following his first win of the season, Piastri moved to fourth with 34 points. McLaren extended their lead in the Constructors' Championship to 21 points over Mercedes, while Red Bull remained in third with 36 points. Despite the double disqualification, Ferrari progressed to fifth with 17 points, the same amount with Williams in fourth. Prior to the 2026 Dutch Grand Prix, this race marked Liam Lawson's most recent start for the senior Red Bull team. Following two consecutive pointless races, Lawson was swapped with Yuki Tsunoda from the following Japanese Grand Prix onward.

== Background ==
The event took place across the weekend of 21–23 March and was the 18th edition of the Chinese Grand Prix, all of which had been held at the Shanghai International Circuit in Shanghai. The Grand Prix was the second round of the 2025 Formula One World Championship and the 18th running of the Chinese Grand Prix. It was also the first of six Grands Prix in the season to utilise the sprint format and the second time overall that the Chinese Grand Prix featured it.

Prior to the event, teams and tyre supplier Pirelli faced "logistical issues" involving the transportation of equipment from Melbourne, venue of the preceding Grand Prix, to Shanghai. As a result, the FIA gave special dispensation to reduce the night curfew period on Wednesday before the event from eleven and a half to six hours in order to minimise the impact on the event.

=== Championship standings before the race ===
Going into the event, Lando Norris led the Drivers' Championship with 25 points, 7 points ahead of Max Verstappen in second, and 10 ahead of George Russell in third. McLaren entered the round as Constructors' Championship leaders on 27 points, ahead of Mercedes, also on 27 and Red Bull Racing, who were third with 18 points.

=== Entrants ===
The drivers and teams were the same as published in the season entry list, with no additional stand-in drivers for the race. The Grand Prix marked the last for Liam Lawson at Red Bull Racing and Yuki Tsunoda for Racing Bulls; from the Japanese Grand Prix onward, the drivers would swap teams.

=== Tyre choices ===
Tyre supplier Pirelli brought the C2, C3, and C4 tyre compounds designated hard, medium, and soft, respectively, for teams to use at the event.

=== Track changes ===
The DRS zone leading in to turn 14 was lengthened by 75 metres (246 ft).

== Practice ==
The sole free practice session was held on 21 March 2025, at 11:30 local time (UTC+8). Led out by Oliver Bearman, all drivers started the session fitted with the medium-compound tyres. Early in the session, both Liam Lawson and Alexander Albon drove into the gravel. By the mid-way point of practice, George Russell led the timesheets with a time of 1:32.377, half a second clear of Charles Leclerc in second and one second quicker than the previous year's pole time. An issue with Jack Doohan's Alpine forced a red flag, halting the session until there were only 7 minutes remaining. In the end, Lando Norris topped the session, followed by Leclerc, Oscar Piastri, Lewis Hamilton and Russell rounding out the top five.

== Sprint qualifying ==
Sprint qualifying was held on 21 March 2025, at 15:30 local time (UTC+8), and determined the starting grid order for the sprint.

=== Sprint qualifying report ===
Lasting 12 minutes, the first of three sprint qualifying segments (SQ1) required all drivers to use the medium-compound tyres. Hamilton claimed the fastest time, ahead of Norris and Leclerc. Lawson, Nico Hulkenberg, Esteban Ocon, Pierre Gasly and Doohan where all eliminated in the first segment.

SQ2 was 10 minutes long session with drivers again mandated to use the medium tyres. After the first sequence of laps, Norris claimed the top time, and held it throughout the session. Fernando Alonso, Bearman, Carlos Sainz Jr., Gabriel Bortoleto and Isack Hadjar were knocked out.

=== Sprint qualifying classification ===
Pos.	No.	Driver	Constructor	Qualifying times			Sprint grid
Pos.	No.	Driver	Constructor	SQ1	SQ2	SQ3	Sprint grid
1	44	(United Kingdom) Lewis Hamilton	Ferrari	1:31.212	1:31.384	1:30.849	1
2	1	(Netherlands) Max Verstappen	Red Bull Racing-Honda RBPT	1:31.916	1:31.521	1:30.867	2
3	81	(Australia) Oscar Piastri	McLaren-Mercedes	1:31.723	1:31.362	1:30.929	3
4	16	(Monaco) Charles Leclerc	Ferrari	1:31.518	1:31.561	1:31.057	4
5	63	(United Kingdom) George Russell	Mercedes	1:31.952	1:31.346	1:31.169	5
6	4	(United Kingdom) Lando Norris	McLaren-Mercedes	1:31.396	1:31.174	1:31.393	6
7	12	(Italy) Kimi Antonelli	Mercedes	1:31.999	1:31.475	1:31.738	7
8	22	(Japan) Yuki Tsunoda	Racing Bulls-Honda RBPT	1:32.316	1:31.794	1:31.773	8
9	23	(Thailand) Alexander Albon	Williams-Mercedes	1:32.462	1:31.539	1:31.852	9
10	18	(Canada) Lance Stroll	Aston Martin Aramco-Mercedes	1:32.327	1:31.742	1:31.982	10
11	14	(Spain) Fernando Alonso	Aston Martin Aramco-Mercedes	1:32.121	1:31.815	N/A	11
12	87	(United Kingdom) Oliver Bearman	Haas-Ferrari	1:32.269	1:31.978	N/A	12
13	55	(Spain) Carlos Sainz Jr.	Williams-Mercedes	1:32.457	1:32.325	N/A	13
14	5	(Brazil) Gabriel Bortoleto	Kick Sauber-Ferrari	1:32.539	1:32.564	N/A	14
15	6	(France) Isack Hadjar	Racing Bulls-Honda RBPT	1:32.171	No time	N/A	15
16	7	(Australia) Jack Doohan	Alpine-Renault	1:32.575	N/A	N/A	16
17	10	(France) Pierre Gasly	Alpine-Renault	1:32.640	N/A	N/A	17
18	31	(France) Esteban Ocon	Haas-Ferrari	1:32.651	N/A	N/A	18
19	27	(Germany) Nico Hülkenberg	Kick Sauber-Ferrari	1:32.675	N/A	N/A	PL^{1}
20	30	(New Zealand) Liam Lawson	Red Bull Racing-Honda RBPT	1:32.729	N/A	N/A	19
107% time: 1:37.596

Notes

- ^1 – Nico Hülkenberg qualified 19th, but was required to start the sprint from the pit lane as his car was modified under parc fermé conditions.

== Sprint ==
The sprint was held on 22 March 2025, at 11:00 local time (UTC+8), and was run for 19 laps.

=== Sprint report ===
Hamilton held the lead throughout the sprint to take his and Ferrari's first sprint victory. The remaining podium positions were secured by Oscar Piastri in the McLaren and Max Verstappen in the Red Bull. Early championship leader Lando Norris in the McLaren finished eighth having lost places at the start of the race.

=== Sprint classification ===
Pos.	No.	Driver	Constructor	Laps	Time/Retired	Grid	Points
1	44	(United Kingdom) Lewis Hamilton	Ferrari	19	30:39.965	1	8
2	81	(Australia) Oscar Piastri	McLaren-Mercedes	19	+6.889	3	7
3	1	(Netherlands) Max Verstappen	Red Bull Racing-Honda RBPT	19	+9.804	2	6
4	63	(United Kingdom) George Russell	Mercedes	19	+11.592	5	5
5	16	(Monaco) Charles Leclerc	Ferrari	19	+12.190	4	4
6	22	(Japan) Yuki Tsunoda	Racing Bulls-Honda RBPT	19	+22.288	8	3
7	12	(Italy) Kimi Antonelli	Mercedes	19	+23.038	7	2
8	4	(United Kingdom) Lando Norris	McLaren-Mercedes	19	+23.471	6	1
9	18	(Canada) Lance Stroll	Aston Martin Aramco-Mercedes	19	+24.916	10	
10	14	(Spain) Fernando Alonso	Aston Martin Aramco-Mercedes	19	+38.218	11	
11	23	(Thailand) Alexander Albon	Williams-Mercedes	19	+39.292	9	
12	10	(France) Pierre Gasly	Alpine-Renault	19	+39.649	17	
13	6	(France) Isack Hadjar	Racing Bulls-Honda RBPT	19	+42.400	15	
14	30	(New Zealand) Liam Lawson	Red Bull Racing-Honda RBPT	19	+44.904	19	
15	87	(United Kingdom) Oliver Bearman	Haas-Ferrari	19	+45.649	12	
16	31	(France) Esteban Ocon	Haas-Ferrari	19	+46.182	18	
17	55	(Spain) Carlos Sainz Jr.	Williams-Mercedes	19	+51.376	13	
18	5	(Brazil) Gabriel Bortoleto	Kick Sauber-Ferrari	19	+53.940	14	
19	27	(Germany) Nico Hülkenberg	Kick Sauber-Ferrari	19	+56.682	PL	
20	7	(Australia) Jack Doohan	Alpine-Renault	19	+1:10.212^{1}	16	

Notes

- ^1 – Jack Doohan finished 20th on track, but received a post-sprint ten-second time penalty for causing a collision with Gabriel Bortoleto. The penalty made no difference as he was classified in the last position.

== Qualifying ==
Qualifying was held on 22 March 2025, at 15:00 local time (UTC+8), and determined the starting grid order for the main race.

=== Qualifying report ===
Oscar Piastri in the McLaren took his maiden Grand Prix pole position ahead of George Russell in the Mercedes. Piastri's teammate Lando Norris qualified third having topped the opening two segment of qualifying.

=== Qualifying classification ===
Pos.	No.	Driver	Constructor	Qualifying times			Final grid
Pos.	No.	Driver	Constructor	Q1	Q2	Q3	Final grid
1	81	(Australia) Oscar Piastri	McLaren-Mercedes	1:31.591	1:31.200	1:30.641	1
2	63	(United Kingdom) George Russell	Mercedes	1:31.295	1:31.307	1:30.723	2
3	4	(United Kingdom) Lando Norris	McLaren-Mercedes	1:30.983	1:30.787	1:30.793	3
4	1	(Netherlands) Max Verstappen	Red Bull Racing-Honda RBPT	1:31.424	1:31.142	1:30.817	4
5	44	(United Kingdom) Lewis Hamilton	Ferrari	1:31.690	1:31.501	1:30.927	5
6	16	(Monaco) Charles Leclerc	Ferrari	1:31.579	1:31.450	1:31.021	6
7	6	(France) Isack Hadjar	Racing Bulls-Honda RBPT	1:31.162	1:31.253	1:31.079	7
8	12	(Italy) Kimi Antonelli	Mercedes	1:31.676	1:31.590	1:31.103	8
9	22	(Japan) Yuki Tsunoda	Racing Bulls-Honda RBPT	1:31.238	1:31.260	1:31.638	9
10	23	(Thailand) Alexander Albon	Williams-Mercedes	1:31.503	1:31.595	1:31.706	10
11	31	(France) Esteban Ocon	Haas-Ferrari	1:31.876	1:31.625	N/A	11
12	27	(Germany) Nico Hülkenberg	Kick Sauber-Ferrari	1:31.921	1:31.632	N/A	12
13	14	(Spain) Fernando Alonso	Aston Martin Aramco-Mercedes	1:31.719	1:31.688	N/A	13
14	18	(Canada) Lance Stroll	Aston Martin Aramco-Mercedes	1:31.923	1:31.773	N/A	14
15	55	(Spain) Carlos Sainz Jr.	Williams-Mercedes	1:31.628	1:31.840	N/A	15
16	10	(France) Pierre Gasly	Alpine-Renault	1:31.992	N/A	N/A	16
17	87	(United Kingdom) Oliver Bearman	Haas-Ferrari	1:32.018	N/A	N/A	17
18	7	(Australia) Jack Doohan	Alpine-Renault	1:32.092	N/A	N/A	18
19	5	(Brazil) Gabriel Bortoleto	Kick Sauber-Ferrari	1:32.141	N/A	N/A	19
20	30	(New Zealand) Liam Lawson	Red Bull Racing-Honda RBPT	1:32.174	N/A	N/A	PL^{1}
107% time: 1:37.351

Notes

- ^1 – Liam Lawson qualified 20th, but was required to start the race from the pit lane as his car was modified under parc fermé conditions.

== Race ==
The race was held on 23 March 2025, at 15:00 local time (UTC+8), and was run for 56 laps.

=== Race report ===
Polesitter Oscar Piastri in the McLaren kept the lead on the first lap, while his teammate Lando Norris moved up to second. Lewis Hamilton in the Ferrari tagged with teammate Charles Leclerc, causing the left endplate of Leclerc's front wing to come off. On the fifth lap, Fernando Alonso in the Aston Martin retired from the race due to overheating on his rear brakes caused by his brake duct assembly setup being different to that from his teammate Lance Stroll, while Gabriel Bortoleto of Sauber spun into the gravel on the same lap, though he was able to keep going.

Piastri and Norris, the latter suffering from a worsening brake issue, completed the 50th 1-2 finish for McLaren ahead of George Russell in the Mercedes.

=== Post-race ===
Following the race, Leclerc of Ferrari and Gasly of Alpine were disqualified due to their cars being underweight, while sprint winner and Leclerc's teammate Hamilton was disqualified for excessive skid wear. This marked the first double disqualification for a team since Renault's double disqualification at the 2019 Japanese Grand Prix, the first Grand Prix to see more than two disqualifications since the 2004 Canadian Grand Prix, and the first time in Formula One history that both Ferrari cars had been disqualified from a Grand Prix. (Note: Both Ferrari cars were initially disqualified after the 1999 Malaysian Grand Prix, but the team lodged an appeal that was upheld.)

=== Race classification ===
Pos.	No.	Driver	Constructor	Laps	Time/Retired	Grid	Points
1	81	(Australia) Oscar Piastri	McLaren-Mercedes	56	1:30:55.026	1	25
2	4	(United Kingdom) Lando Norris	McLaren-Mercedes	56	+9.748	3	18
3	63	(United Kingdom) George Russell	Mercedes	56	+11.097	2	15
4	1	(Netherlands) Max Verstappen	Red Bull Racing-Honda RBPT	56	+16.656	4	12
5	31	(France) Esteban Ocon	Haas-Ferrari	56	+49.969	11	10
6	12	(Italy) Kimi Antonelli	Mercedes	56	+53.748	8	8
7	23	(Thailand) Alexander Albon	Williams-Mercedes	56	+56.321	10	6
8	87	(United Kingdom) Oliver Bearman	Haas-Ferrari	56	+1:01.303	17	4
9	18	(Canada) Lance Stroll	Aston Martin Aramco-Mercedes	56	+1:10.204	14	2
10	55	(Spain) Carlos Sainz Jr.	Williams-Mercedes	56	+1:16.387	15	1
11	6	(France) Isack Hadjar	Racing Bulls-Honda RBPT	56	+1:18.875	7	
12	30	(New Zealand) Liam Lawson	Red Bull Racing-Honda RBPT	56	+1:21.147	PL	
13	7	(Australia) Jack Doohan	Alpine-Renault	56	+1:28.401^{1}	18	
14	5	(Brazil) Gabriel Bortoleto	Kick Sauber-Ferrari	55	+1 lap	19	
15	27	(Germany) Nico Hülkenberg	Kick Sauber-Ferrari	55	+1 lap	12	
16	22	(Japan) Yuki Tsunoda	Racing Bulls-Honda RBPT	55	+1 lap	9	
Ret	14	(Spain) Fernando Alonso	Aston Martin Aramco-Mercedes	4	Brakes	13	
DSQ	16	(Monaco) Charles Leclerc	Ferrari	56	Underweight^{2}	6	
DSQ	44	(United Kingdom) Lewis Hamilton	Ferrari	56	Plank wear^{3}	5	
DSQ	10	(France) Pierre Gasly	Alpine-Renault	56	Underweight^{2}	16	

Notes

- ^1 – Jack Doohan finished 14th, but received a ten-second time penalty for forcing Isack Hadjar off-track. This initially dropped him to 16th in the provisional classification, but was promoted three positions following the disqualifications of Charles Leclerc, Lewis Hamilton and Pierre Gasly.
- ^2 – Charles Leclerc and Pierre Gasly finished fifth and 11th, respectively, but were disqualified as their cars were found underweight.
- ^3 – Lewis Hamilton finished sixth, but was disqualified for excessive plank wear.

== Championship standings after the race ==
Drivers' Championship standings

	Pos.	Driver	Points
	1	(United Kingdom) Lando Norris	44
	2	(Netherlands) Max Verstappen	36
	3	(United Kingdom) George Russell	35
5	4	(Australia) Oscar Piastri	34
1	5	(Italy) Kimi Antonelli	22

Constructors' Championship standings

	Pos.	Constructor	Points
	1	(United Kingdom) McLaren-Mercedes	78
	2	(Germany) Mercedes	57
	3	(Austria) Red Bull Racing-Honda RBPT	36
	4	(United Kingdom) Williams-Mercedes	17
2	5	(Italy) Ferrari	17

- Note: Only the top five positions are included for both sets of standings.

== Notes ==
Previous race: 2025 Australian Grand Prix	FIA Formula One World Championship; 2025 season	Next race: 2025 Japanese Grand Prix
Previous race: 2024 Chinese Grand Prix	Chinese Grand Prix	Next race: 2026 Chinese Grand Prix
