= 2025 Formula One World Championship =

76th Formula One season

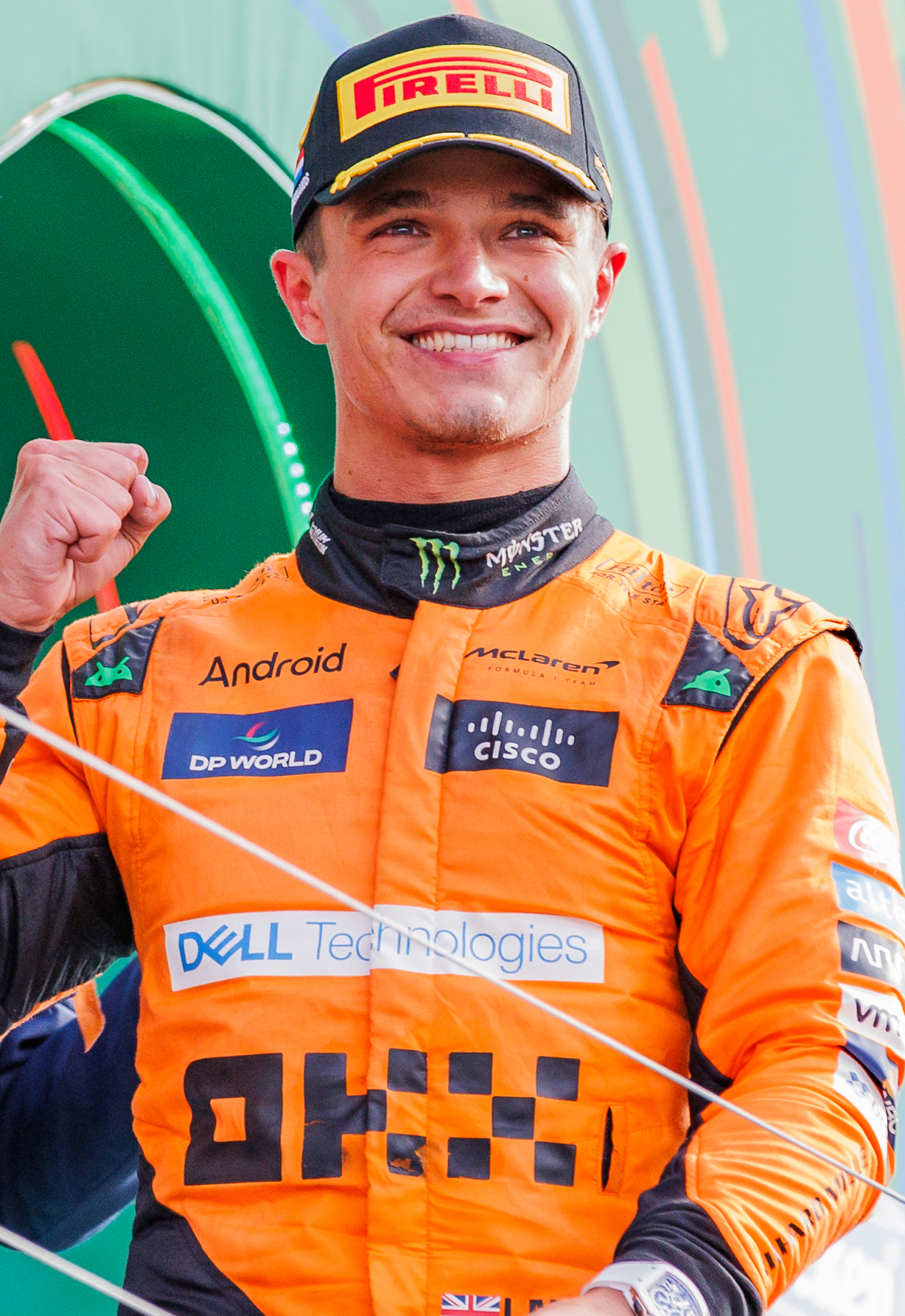
Lando Norris won his first World Drivers' Championship, driving for McLaren-Mercedes.

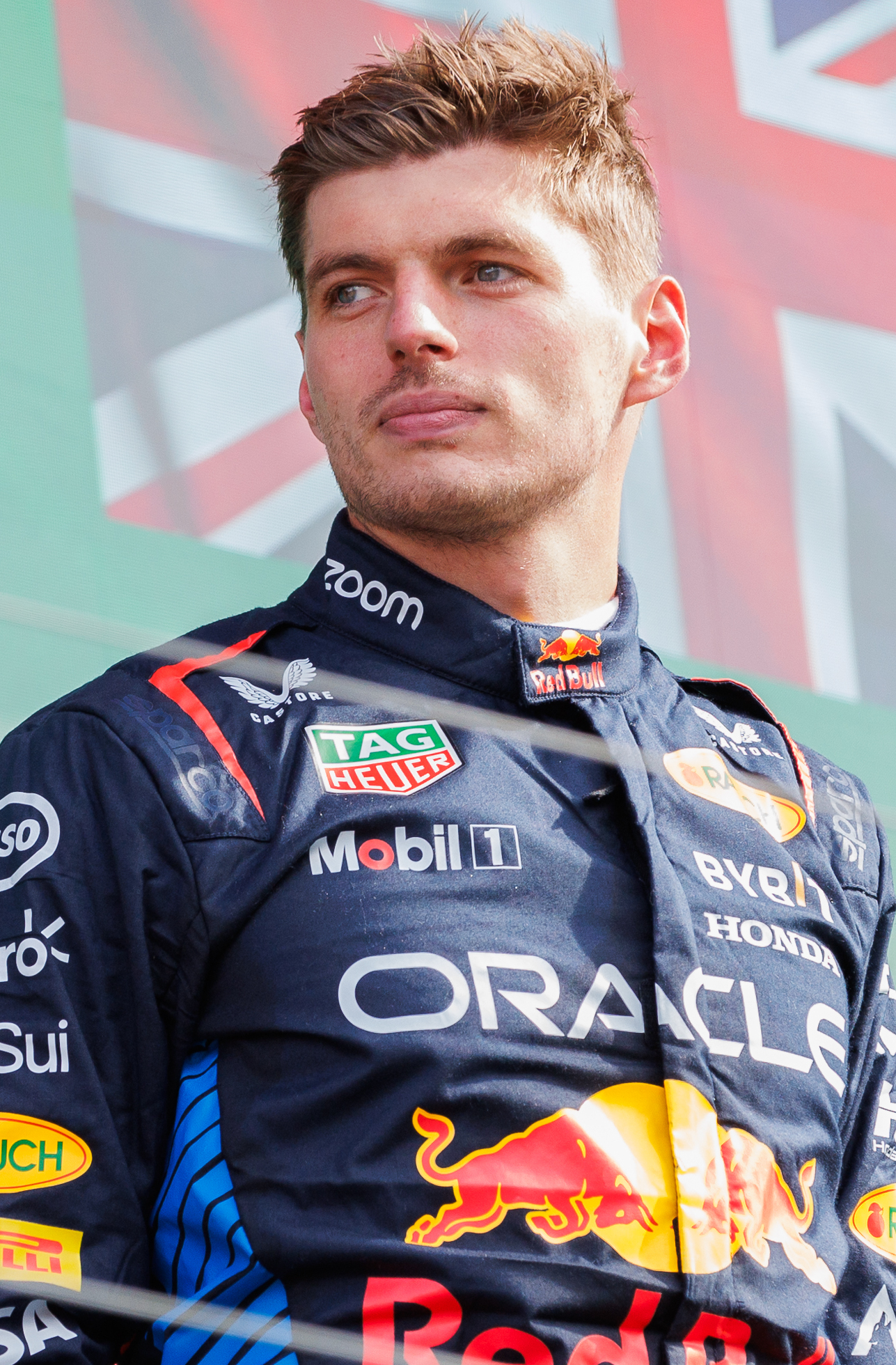
Defending champion Max Verstappen finished runner-up by two points, driving for Red Bull Racing-Honda RBPT.

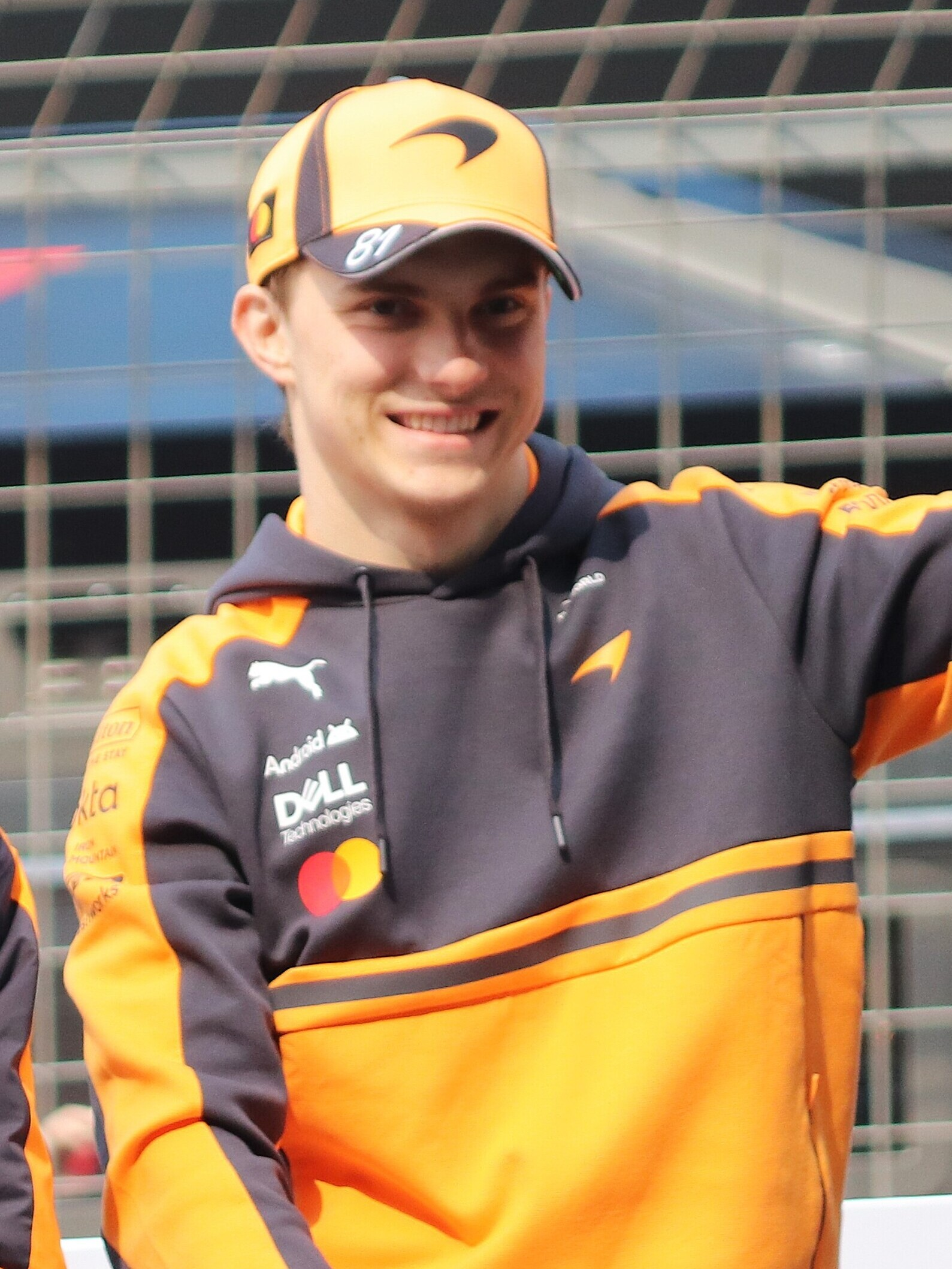
Norris's teammate Oscar Piastri (pictured in 2026) finished third after leading for 15 rounds of the season.

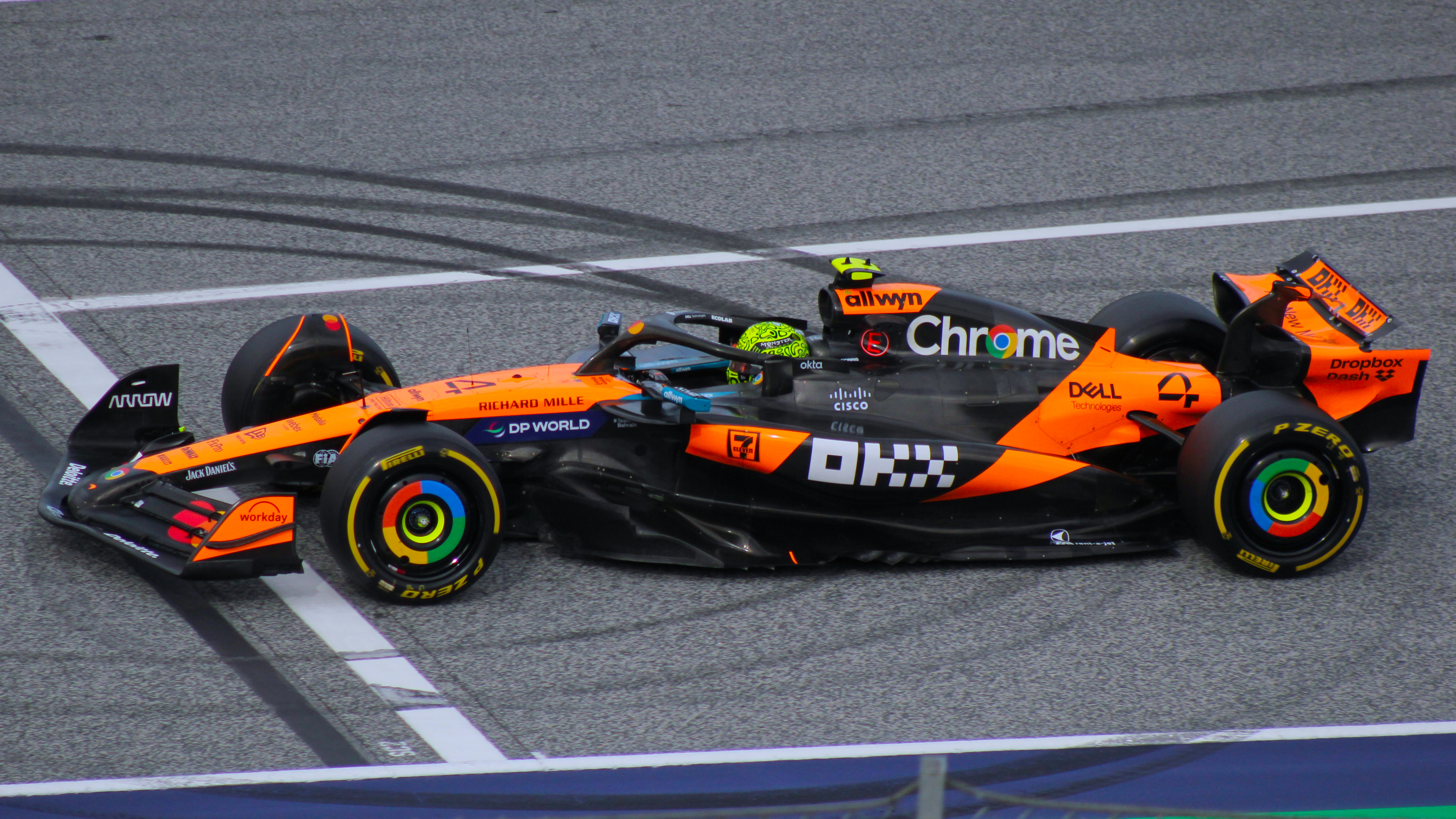
McLaren-Mercedes won their second consecutive Constructors' Championship and tenth overall.

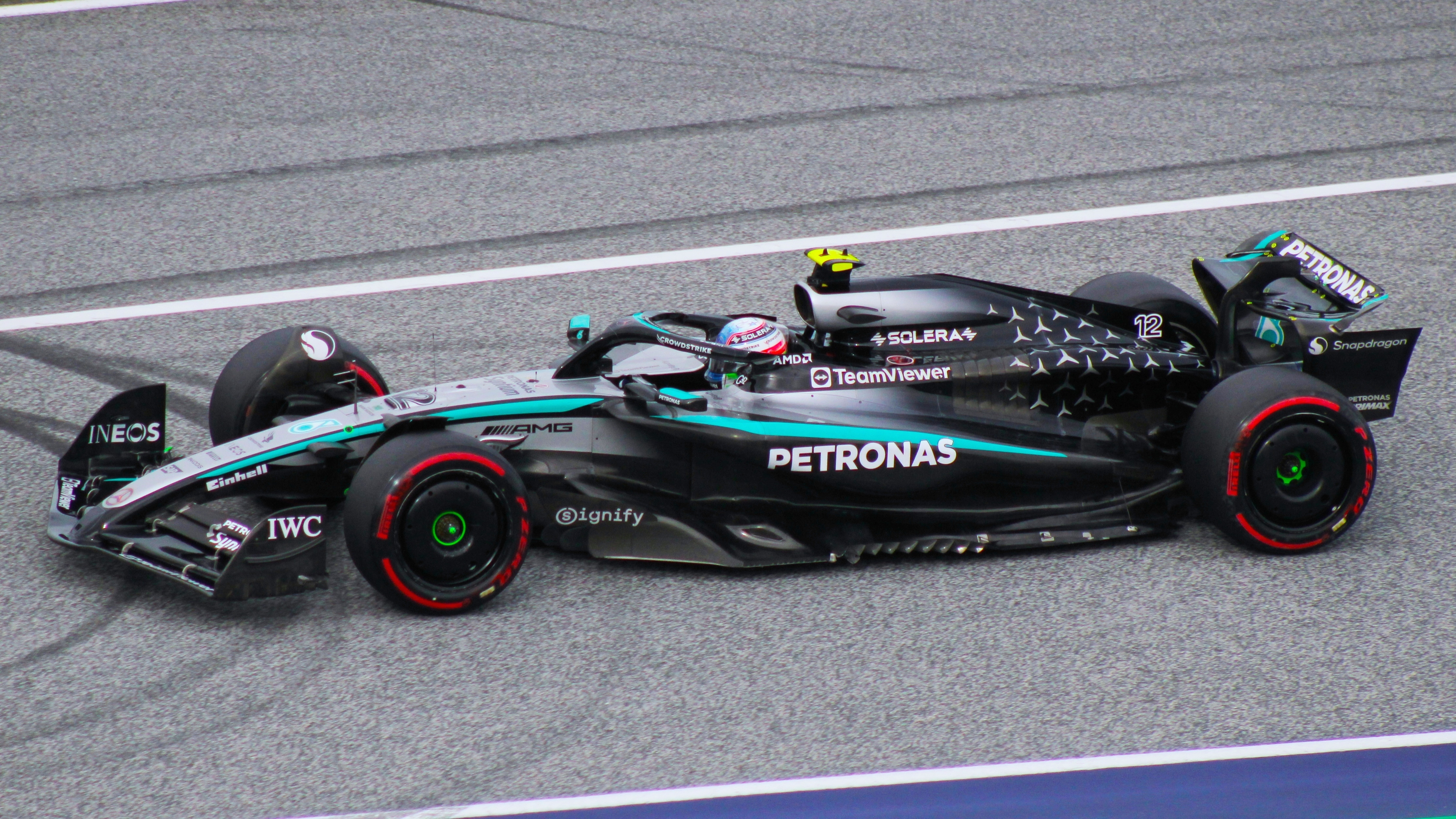
Mercedes finished second in the World Constructors' Championship.

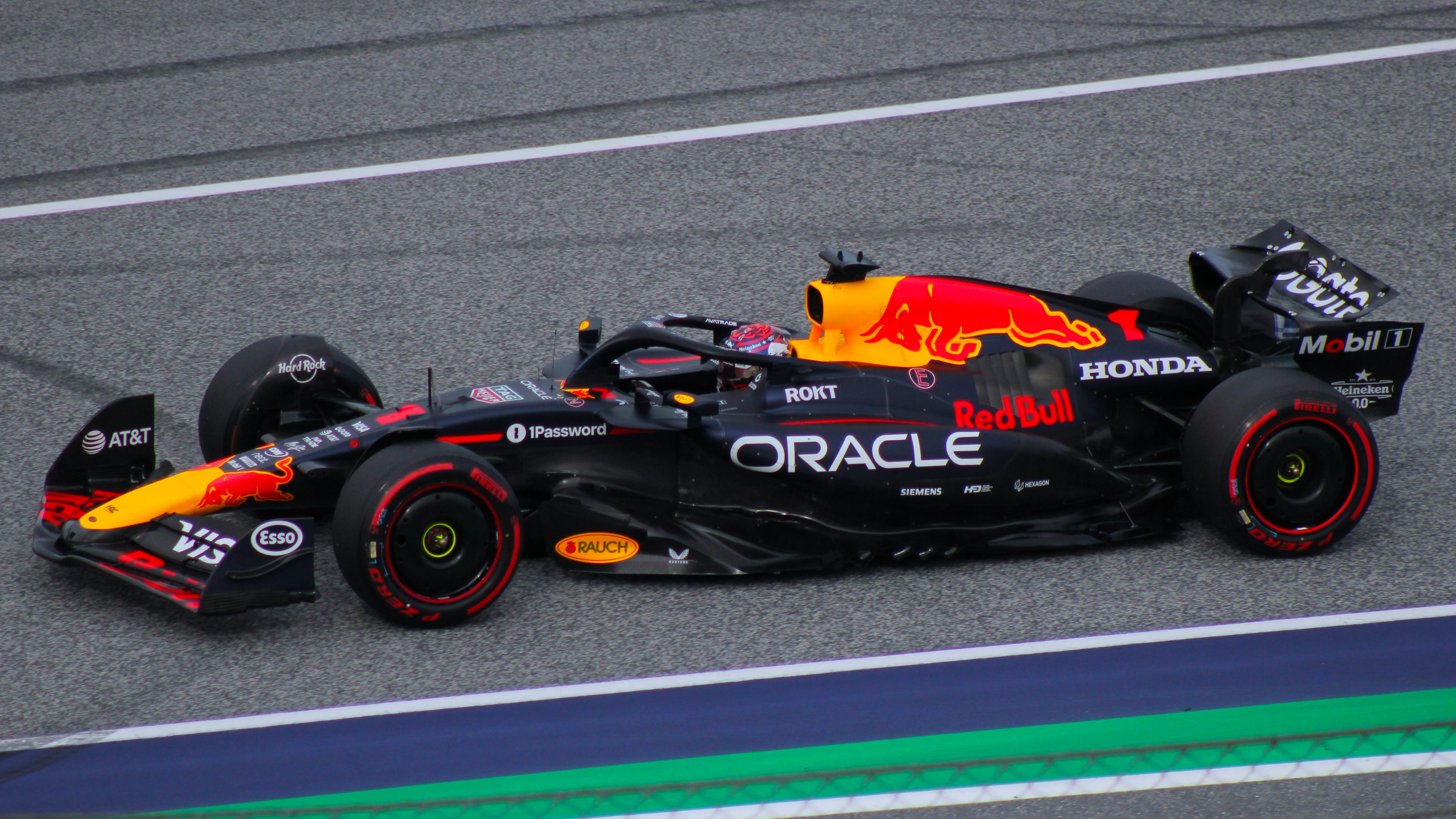
Red Bull Racing-Honda RBPT finished third in the World Constructors' Championship.

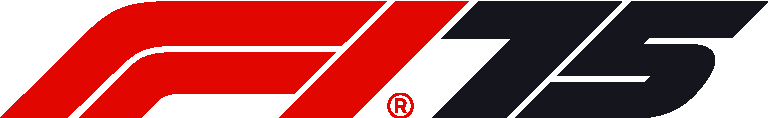
Formula One celebrated its 75th anniversary in 2025. This logo was displayed on its graphics package and trackside until the Hungarian Grand Prix.

The 2025 FIA Formula One World Championship was a motor racing championship for Formula One cars and the 76th running of the Formula One World Championship. It was recognised by the Fédération Internationale de l'Automobile (FIA), the governing body of international motorsport, as the highest class of competition for open-wheel racing cars. The championship was contested over 24 Grands Prix held around the world. It began in March and ended in December.

Drivers and teams competed for the titles of World Drivers' Champion and World Constructors' Champion, respectively. The season saw Lando Norris win his first drivers' title in his seventh season in the sport, ending the four-year reign of Max Verstappen as champion. The season was largely dominated by McLaren drivers Norris and Oscar Piastri, and reigning Drivers' Champion Verstappen, driving for Red Bull Racing-Honda RBPT. All three were in the running for the World Drivers' Championship going into the season ending Abu Dhabi Grand Prix, with Norris in the championship lead and Verstappen having closed a gap of 104 points down to 12. Norris's third-place finish in the season finale was enough to win the title. Defending champion Verstappen won the race, allowing him to finish within two points of Norris in the championship. Piastri, who had led the championship for 15 rounds, finished the season in third, 13 points behind Norris. Norris became the 35th driver overall to claim the World Drivers' Championship, and the eighth to do so driving for McLaren. At the Singapore Grand Prix, defending Constructors' Champions McLaren successfully retained their Constructors' title moving them second on the all-time list with ten titles ahead of Williams. It was the first time they had secured both the Drivers' and Constructors' titles since 1998.

This season also featured the debut of future Formula One world champion Kimi Antonelli, who drove for Mercedes in his rookie season.

== Entries ==
All teams competed with tyres supplied by Pirelli. Each team was required to enter at least two drivers, one for each of the two mandatory cars.

Teams and drivers that competed in the 2025 World Championship
Entrant	Constructor	Chassis	Power unit	Race drivers		
Entrant	Constructor	Chassis	Power unit	No.	Driver name	Rounds
(France) BWT Alpine F1 Team	Alpine-Renault	A525	Renault E-Tech RE25	7; 43; 10	(Australia) Jack Doohan (Argentina) Franco Colapinto (France) Pierre Gasly	1–6; 7–24; All
(United Kingdom) Aston Martin Aramco F1 Team	Aston Martin Aramco-Mercedes	AMR25	Mercedes-AMG F1 M16	14; 18	(Spain) Fernando Alonso (Canada) Lance Stroll	All; All (Note: Lance Stroll was entered into the Spanish Grand Prix, but later withdrew due to pain in his hand and wrist.)
(Italy) Scuderia Ferrari HP	Ferrari	SF-25	Ferrari 066/15	16; 44	(Monaco) Charles Leclerc (United Kingdom) Lewis Hamilton	All; All
(United States) MoneyGram Haas F1 Team	Haas-Ferrari	VF-25	Ferrari 066/15	31; 87	(France) Esteban Ocon (United Kingdom) Oliver Bearman	All; All
(Switzerland) Stake F1 Team Kick Sauber (Note: Sauber's sponsorship arrangement was with Stake, whose co-founders are backers of Kick. Sauber entered rounds 1, 9, 13, 15, and 23–24 as "Kick Sauber F1 Team".)	Kick Sauber-Ferrari	C45	Ferrari 066/15	5; 27	(Brazil) Gabriel Bortoleto (Germany) Nico Hülkenberg	All; All
(United Kingdom) McLaren Formula 1 Team	McLaren-Mercedes	MCL39	Mercedes-AMG F1 M16	4; 81	(United Kingdom) Lando Norris (Australia) Oscar Piastri	All; All
(Germany) Mercedes-AMG Petronas F1 Team	Mercedes	F1 W16	Mercedes-AMG F1 M16	12; 63	(Italy) Kimi Antonelli (United Kingdom) George Russell	All; All
(Italy) Visa Cash App Racing Bulls F1 Team	Racing Bulls-Honda RBPT	VCARB 02	Honda RBPTH003	6; 22; 30	(France) Isack Hadjar (Japan) Yuki Tsunoda (New Zealand) Liam Lawson	All; 1–2; 3–24
(Austria) Oracle Red Bull Racing	Red Bull Racing-Honda RBPT	RB21	Honda RBPTH003	1; 30; 22	(Netherlands) Max Verstappen (New Zealand) Liam Lawson (Japan) Yuki Tsunoda	All; 1–2; 3–24
(United Kingdom) Atlassian Williams Racing	Williams-Mercedes	FW47	Mercedes-AMG F1 M16	23; 55	(Thailand) Alexander Albon (Spain) Carlos Sainz Jr.	All; All

=== Free practice drivers ===
On four occasions throughout the season (twice for each car) in one of the first two free practice sessions of a Grand Prix weekend, each team had to field a driver who had not competed in more than two races. Gabriel Bortoleto, Isack Hadjar and Kimi Antonelli's participation at the Australian and Chinese Grands Prix fulfilled both of the required rookie sessions for their respective cars at Sauber, Racing Bulls and Mercedes. Jack Doohan's participation at the Australian Grand Prix fulfilled one of the required rookie sessions for his car at Alpine. (Note: Jack Doohan's participation at the Chinese Grand Prix did not count as it was his third Grand Prix start, with Doohan having made his race debut at the 2024 Abu Dhabi Grand Prix.)

Drivers that took part in first or second free practice sessions
Constructor	Practice drivers		
Constructor	No.	Driver name	Rounds
Alpine-Renault	62; 61	(Japan) Ryo Hirakawa (Estonia) Paul Aron	3; 16, 20, 24
Aston Martin Aramco-Mercedes	34; 35; 34	(Brazil) Felipe Drugovich (United States) Jak Crawford (Great Britain) Cian Shields	4, 14; 20, 24; 24
Ferrari	38; 38; 39	(Sweden) Dino Beganovic (Italy) Antonio Fuoco (Monaco) Arthur Leclerc	4, 11; 20; 24
Haas-Ferrari	50	(Japan) Ryo Hirakawa	4, 9, 20, 24
Kick Sauber-Ferrari	97	(Estonia) Paul Aron	12, 14
McLaren-Mercedes	89; 89	(Ireland) Alexander Dunne (Mexico) Patricio O'Ward	11, 16; 20, 24
Mercedes	72	(Denmark) Frederik Vesti	4, 20
Racing Bulls-Honda RBPT	40	(Japan) Ayumu Iwasa	20, 24
Red Bull Racing-Honda RBPT	37; 36	(Japan) Ayumu Iwasa (Great Britain) Arvid Lindblad	4; 12, 20, 24
Williams-Mercedes	46; 45	(Great Britain) Luke Browning (France) Victor Martins	4, 20, 24; 9

=== Team changes ===
RB discontinued its use of initialism and entered instead as Racing Bulls, thus changing its team and constructor name.

=== Driver changes ===
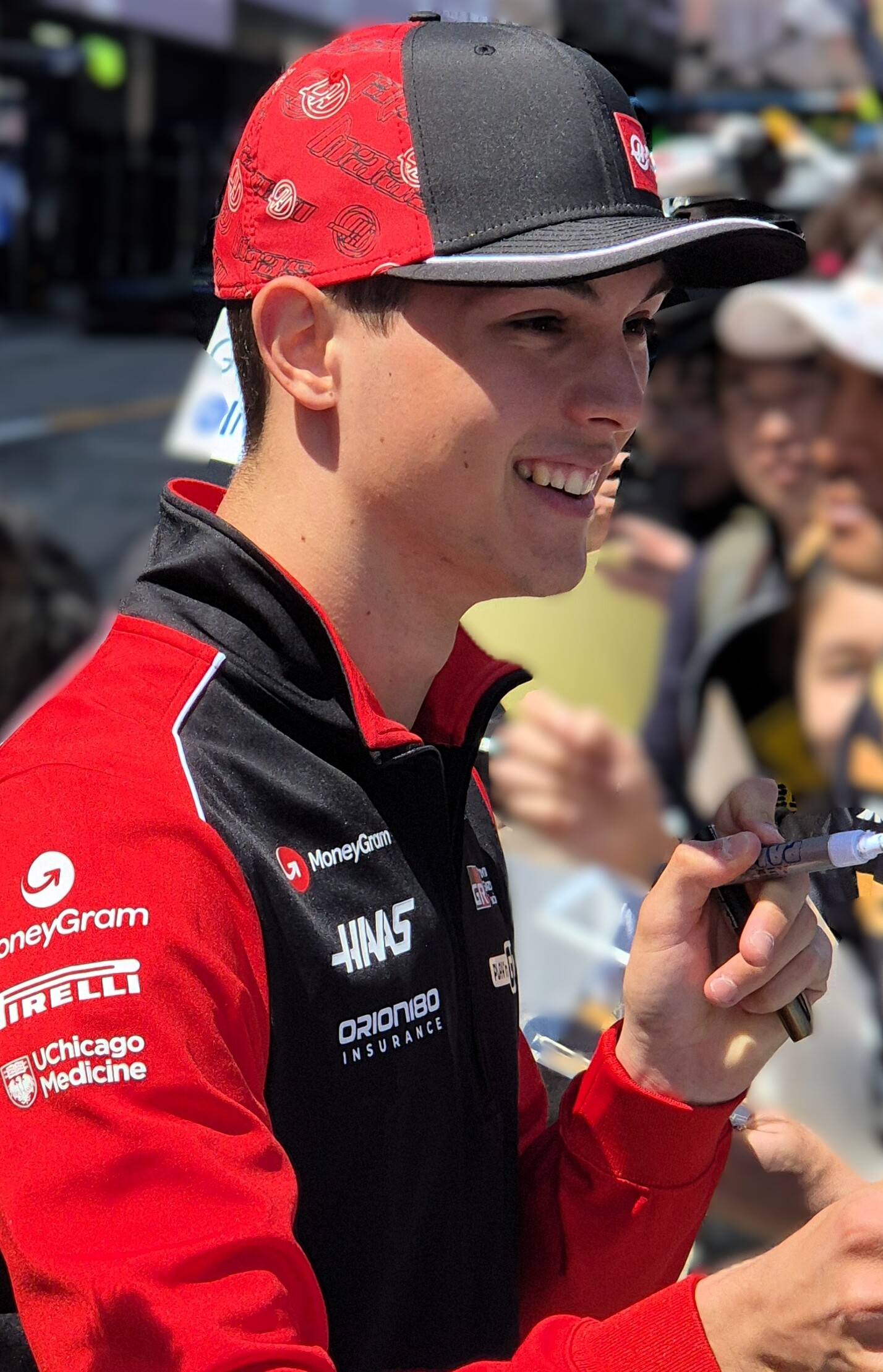
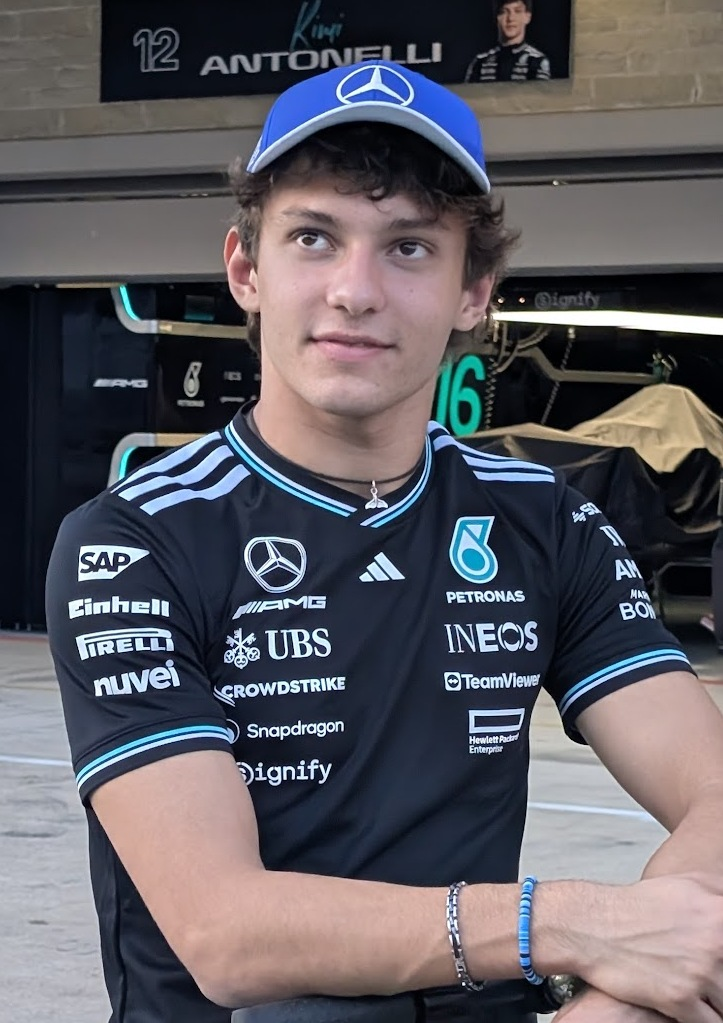
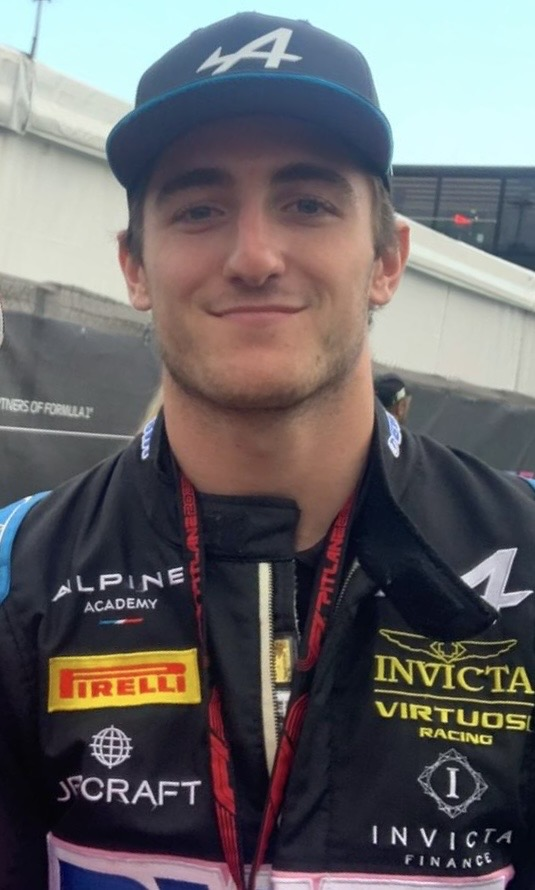
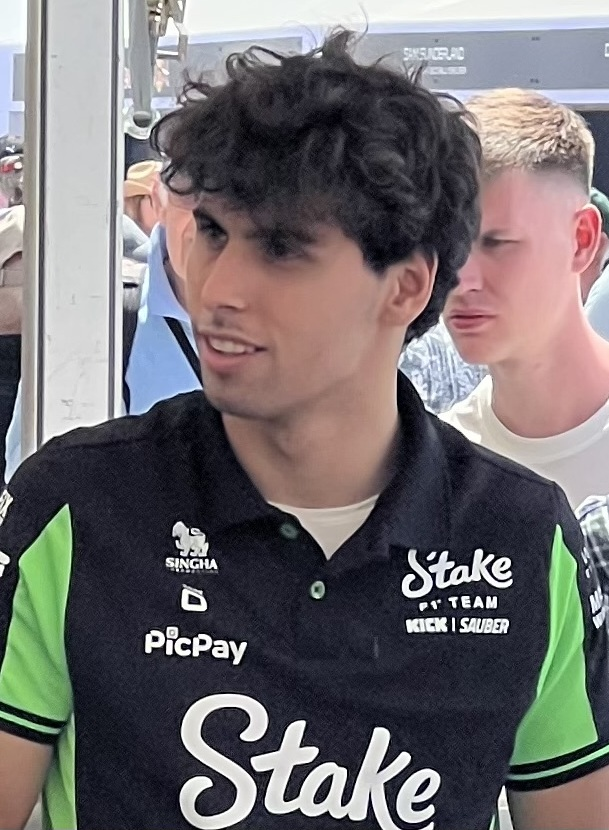
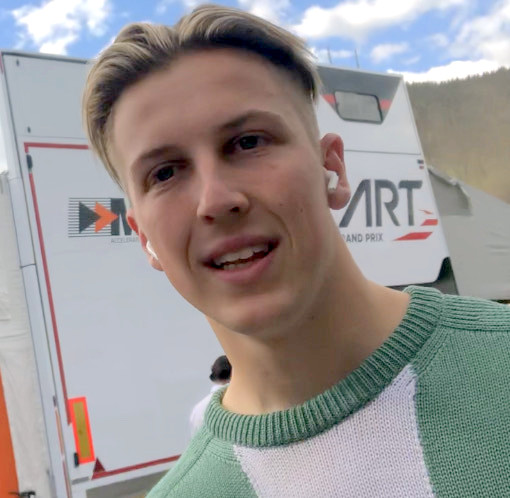
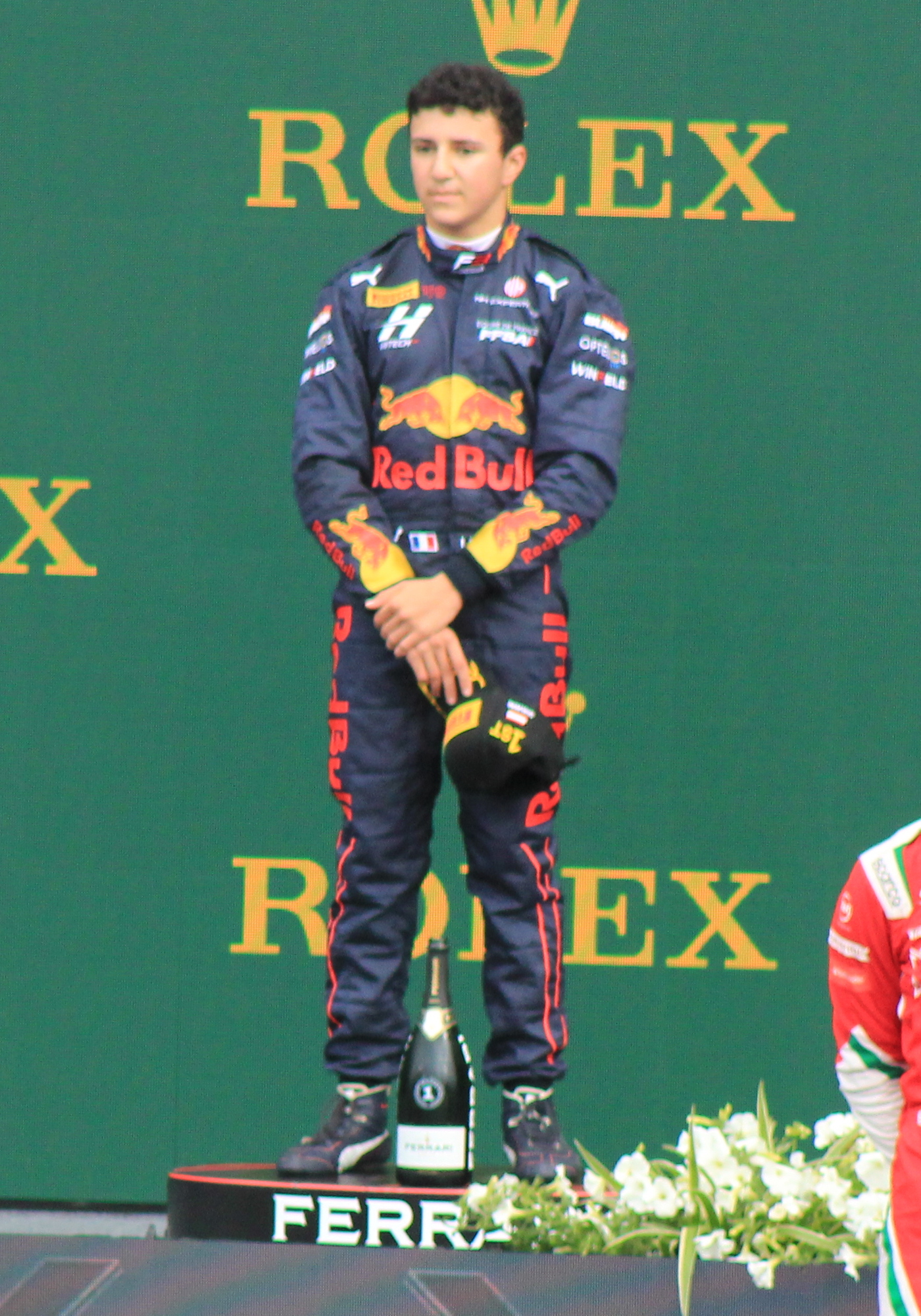
Oliver Bearman (top left), Kimi Antonelli (top centre), Jack Doohan (top right), Gabriel Bortoleto (bottom left), Liam Lawson (bottom centre) and Isack Hadjar (bottom right) made their debuts as full-time drivers with Haas, Mercedes, Alpine, Sauber, Red Bull Racing, and Racing Bulls, respectively.

Lewis Hamilton left Mercedes after twelve seasons to join Ferrari, ending his record breaking streak of the most consecutive seasons driving for a single constructor. He replaced Carlos Sainz Jr., who left Ferrari after four seasons to join Williams on a multi-year deal. Sainz was initially set to replace Logan Sargeant, before Sargeant was replaced by Franco Colapinto midway through the 2024 season. Hamilton was replaced by Mercedes junior Kimi Antonelli, who was promoted from Formula 2. Colapinto left Williams to join Alpine as a reserve driver.

Haas fielded an all-new line-up in 2025; Nico Hülkenberg departed the team after two seasons to drive for Sauber, he previously competed for the team in 2013. He was replaced by Haas's reserve driver Oliver Bearman, who stepped up from Formula 2. Bearman had competed in three Grand Prix in 2024 as reserve driver, once for Ferrari, at the Saudi Arabian Grand Prix, and twice for Haas at the Azerbaijan and São Paulo Grands Prix. Kevin Magnussen also departed Haas after seven seasons across two stints. He was replaced by Esteban Ocon, who split from Alpine before the 2024 Abu Dhabi Grand Prix after five seasons. Jack Doohan, who replaced Ocon for the 2024 Abu Dhabi Grand Prix, obtained the seat at Alpine for 2025.

Valtteri Bottas and Zhou Guanyu both left Sauber after three years. Both moved to reserve driver roles; Zhou at Ferrari and Bottas at Mercedes, where he raced from 2017 to 2021. The vacant seat alongside Hülkenberg was filled by reigning Formula 2 Champion Gabriel Bortoleto.

Despite a previously signed contract until 2026, Sergio Pérez left Red Bull Racing after the conclusion of the 2024 season. He was replaced by Liam Lawson, who was promoted from Racing Bulls after five Grands Prix with them in 2023 under the AlphaTauri moniker, and six Grands Prix in 2024 under the RB moniker. Red Bull Racing reserve and 2024 Formula 2 runner-up Isack Hadjar was promoted to Racing Bulls in his place.

==== In-season changes ====
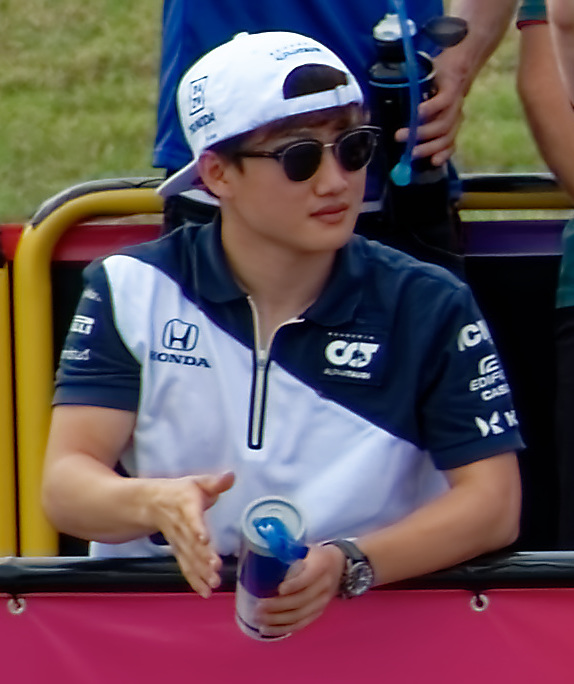
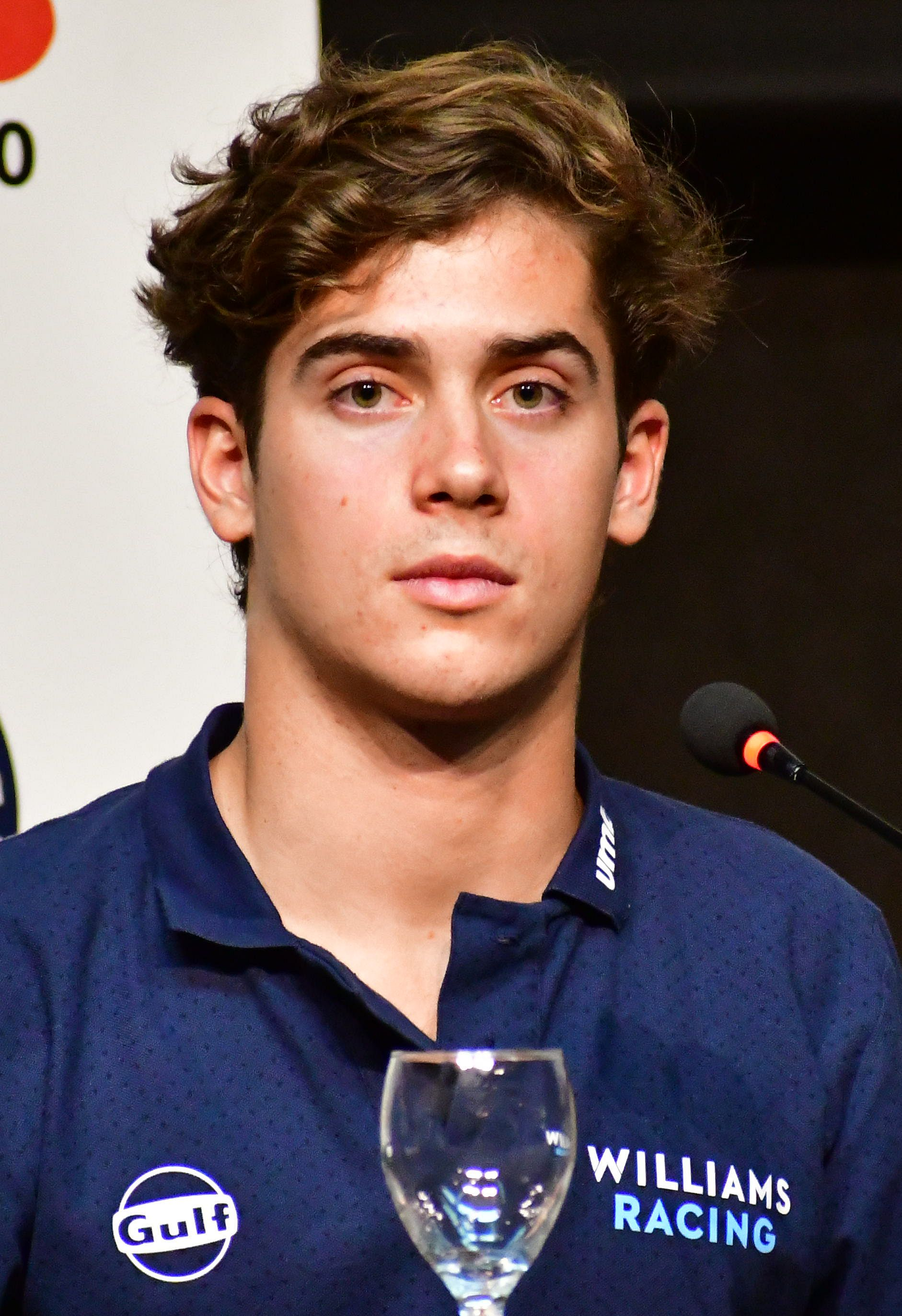
Yuki Tsunoda (left) moved from Racing Bulls to Red Bull Racing from the Japanese Grand Prix onwards, switching with Liam Lawson. Franco Colapinto (right) replaced Jack Doohan at Alpine from the Emilia Romagna Grand Prix onwards.

Following the Chinese Grand Prix, Liam Lawson was demoted to Racing Bulls, with Yuki Tsunoda making his debut for Red Bull Racing at the subsequent Japanese Grand Prix. The move came after analysis of Lawson's performance across the opening two rounds and testing showed that he was not performing to a high enough level.

Following the Miami Grand Prix, Jack Doohan was relegated to a reserve driver role for Alpine. His seat was given to former reserve driver Franco Colapinto on a "rotating seat" basis, with the latter debuting at the subsequent Emilia Romagna Grand Prix and being initially scheduled to race for the team until the Austrian Grand Prix. Before the race at Spielberg, it was confirmed that Colapinto would retain his seat with the team, effectively on a race-by-race basis, Colapinto retained the seat for the entire season. Colapinto previously raced for Williams in nine Grands Prix in 2024.

== Calendar ==
Nations that hosted a Grand Prix in 2025 are highlighted in green, with circuit locations marked with a black dot. Former host nations are shown in dark grey, and former host circuits are marked with a white dot.

The 2025 calendar comprised the same twenty-four Grands Prix as the previous season. The Chinese, Miami, Belgian, United States, São Paulo and Qatar Grands Prix featured the sprint format.

Round	Grand Prix	Circuit	Race date
1	Australian Grand Prix	(Australia) Albert Park Circuit, Melbourne	16 March
2	Chinese Grand Prix	(China) Shanghai International Circuit, Shanghai	23 March
3	Japanese Grand Prix	(Japan) Suzuka Circuit, Suzuka	6 April
4	Bahrain Grand Prix	Bahrain International Circuit, Sakhir	13 April
5	Saudi Arabian Grand Prix	(Saudi Arabia) Jeddah Corniche Circuit, Jeddah	20 April
6	Miami Grand Prix	(United States) Miami International Autodrome, Miami Gardens, Florida	4 May
7	Emilia Romagna Grand Prix	(Italy) Imola Circuit, Imola	18 May
8	Monaco Grand Prix	Circuit de Monaco, Monaco	25 May
9	Spanish Grand Prix	(Spain) Circuit de Barcelona-Catalunya, Montmeló	1 June
10	Canadian Grand Prix	(Canada) Circuit Gilles Villeneuve, Montreal	15 June
11	Austrian Grand Prix	(Austria) Red Bull Ring, Spielberg	29 June
12	British Grand Prix	(United Kingdom) Silverstone Circuit, Silverstone	6 July
13	Belgian Grand Prix	(Belgium) Circuit de Spa-Francorchamps, Stavelot	27 July
14	Hungarian Grand Prix	(Hungary) Hungaroring, Mogyoród	3 August
15	Dutch Grand Prix	(Netherlands) Circuit Zandvoort, Zandvoort	31 August
16	Italian Grand Prix	(Italy) Monza Circuit, Monza	7 September
17	Azerbaijan Grand Prix	(Azerbaijan) Baku City Circuit, Baku	21 September
18	Singapore Grand Prix	Marina Bay Street Circuit, Singapore	5 October
19	United States Grand Prix	(United States) Circuit of the Americas, Austin, Texas	19 October
20	Mexico City Grand Prix	Autódromo Hermanos Rodríguez, Mexico City	26 October
21	São Paulo Grand Prix	(Brazil) Interlagos Circuit, São Paulo	9 November
22	Las Vegas Grand Prix	(United States) Las Vegas Strip Circuit, Paradise, Nevada	22 November (Note: Saturday race.)
23	Qatar Grand Prix	(Qatar) Lusail International Circuit, Lusail	30 November
24	Abu Dhabi Grand Prix	(United Arab Emirates) Yas Marina Circuit, Abu Dhabi	7 December

=== Calendar changes ===
The Australian Grand Prix hosted the opening race of the 2025 season for the first time since 2019. For the previous three years, it was the third round of the season, following the Bahrain and Saudi Arabian Grands Prix, respectively. For 2025, these races were pushed back to avoid conflict with Ramadan. The Russian Grand Prix was under contract to feature on the 2025 calendar, the contract was terminated in 2022 due to the Russian invasion of Ukraine.

== Regulation changes ==
=== Technical regulations ===
==== Driver well-being ====
The minimum driver weight allowance was increased from 80 kilograms (176 lb) to 82 kilograms (181 lb). Consequently, the overall minimum weight limit of the car, excluding fuel, rose from 798 kilograms (1,759 lb) to 800 kilograms (1,764 lb). The adjustment was implemented to promote driver well-being, particularly for individuals who are taller or heavier. A driver cooling kit was introduced for 2025. The system would only be mandated by the FIA when the temperature was forecast to exceed 30.5 °C (86.9 °F), with the minimum weight of the cars increased by 5 kilograms (11 lb) to compensate for the equipment. This was aimed at avoiding a repeat of driver overheating cases, as witnessed at the 2023 Qatar Grand Prix.

==== Car design and maintenance ====
The limit on the number of gearboxes teams can use throughout a season was removed, the limit was considered obsolete given the increased reliability of gearboxes. The FIA introduced stricter rear wing deflection tests that mandated the slot gap deflection be restricted to 2 mm (0.079 in) under a 2 kN (450 lb_{f}) load, this was further 0.5 mm (0.020 in) from the Chinese Grand Prix onwards to counteract teams' usage of a "mini-DRS". Additional front wing tests were implemented in a four-month forewarned technical directive for the Spanish Grand Prix, reducing the deflection under a 1 kN (220 lb_{f}) load from 10 mm (0.39 in) to 5 mm (0.20 in).

=== Sporting regulations ===
The point awarded to drivers finishing in the top ten positions for setting the fastest lap in the race, which was reintroduced in 2019, was abolished.

==== Drivers ====
Drivers' comments were subject to more stringent regulation and stricter punishment. The issue had first come to light when Fédération Internationale de l'Automobile president Mohammed Ben Sulayem said in an interview that he wanted to see less bad language in Formula One. This was closely followed by Max Verstappen and Charles Leclerc, both being investigated and punished for swearing in Formula One interviews during the 2024 campaign. The penalties for "driver misconduct" covered "language, [...], gesture[s] and/or sign[s] that [are] offensive, insulting, coarse, rude or abusive and might reasonably be expected or be perceived to be coarse or rude or to cause offence, humiliation or to be inappropriate", as well as assault and "incitement to do any of the above". A first offence would incur a €40,000 fine; a second, an €80,000 fine and one-month suspension; and a third, a €120,000 fine, one-month suspension, and a championship point deduction. The same penalty scale would apply to any "moral injury or loss" to the "FIA, its bodies, its members or its executive officers" or its values. The making of "political, religious and personal statements or comments" which contravened the FIA's neutrality would also be subject to the same penalties, with the added caveat that drivers will be required to make a full apology and retract their statement. Prior to the Emilia Romagna Grand Prix, the FIA softened its stance, allowing race stewards more discretion in determining whether it is necessary to punish a driver for inappropriate language, and giving officials the option to suspend penalties in cases of mitigating circumstances.

Ahead of the Austrian Grand Prix, the FIA published the latest version of its driving standards guidelines to the public. Originally introduced in 2024, these guidelines aimed to provide drivers with a clearer understanding of the expected racing etiquette during on-track battles. Making the guidelines publicly available was intended to help fans and media better understand the rationale behind the FIA's decision-making and race officiating processes.

The requirement for teams to run a young driver during free practice sessions was increased from once to twice per season per car.

==== Cars ====
The sporting regulations introduced limitations on "testing of previous cars" (TPC). Teams would only be allowed to test using cars that had competed between two and four seasons "preceding the year of the Championship." A cap of twenty days was imposed on TPC activities, with championship drivers restricted to a maximum of 1,000 kilometres (620 mi) across four days of testing. Testing was permitted at any circuit holding FIA Grade 1 or FIA Grade 1T license, but with specific restrictions relating to testing on the circuits included on the current year's calendar. (Note: Testing at "circuit[s] hosting [...] the Championship" was prohibited under three conditions. Firstly, if the circuit was due to host a Formula One race within 60 days of the test. Secondly, if the track had not been used in the previous season (i.e. for testing taking place in 2025, teams could not test at a track from the 2025 calendar if the venue had not also been used in 2024). Thirdly, if it were deemed by the FIA that the circuit had undergone significant modifications since the previous season.)

Following concerns raised during the 2024 Canadian Grand Prix, where Sergio Pérez controversially returned to the pits to avoid a safety car deployment, helping teammate Max Verstappen win the race, the FIA has introduced a new regulation to prevent severely damaged cars from attempting to return to the pits. Previously, drivers could navigate back to the garage even if their cars were damaged and posed a safety risk to others on track. The updated rule allowed the race director to instruct teams to retire a car if it has substantial structural damage or a critical failure that could endanger others or hinder competition. In such cases, the driver must pull over at the nearest safe location rather than continue to the pit lane.

==== Starting procedures ====
The sporting regulations included specific provisions for setting the starting grid in the event that qualifying sessions for either the sprint or the main race were cancelled. In such cases, the starting grid would be determined based on the Drivers' Championship standings. Previously, when a qualifying session could not be held, the starting order was left entirely to the discretion of the stewards. If the championship standings could not be used to determine the grid, the decision remains at the discretion of the race stewards.

The protocol for closing up the grid when cars do not make it to the start of a race was amended. The final grid would now be determined one hour before the start of the race. Cars that are withdrawn up to 75 minutes before the start would not be included in the final grid, and the following cars would all move up the relevant positions. Previously, this timeline was longer.

Drivers starting from the pit lane were now required to take part in the formation lap, marking a departure from previous seasons in which they were permitted to remain in the garage until the race began. Under the updated regulation, once all cars on track have passed the pit exit, pit lane starters must leave in the prescribed order – unless delayed – before re-entering the pit lane at the end of the formation lap. The change was intended to streamline race starts and establish a more consistent pre-race procedure.

The rules surrounding tyres and safety car starts for wet races were tweaked. Since Formula One reverted to a sole tyre supplier in 2007, if a race held in wet conditions started behind the safety car, the FIA mandated the use of full wet tyres. In 2025 competitors were no longer forced to fit full wet tyres for wet safety car starts. The revised regulations give the FIA the flexibility to mandate the use of full wet tyres for race starts should race officials deem it necessary for safety reasons.

==== Regulations for specific events ====
A minimum two-stop strategy, in both wet and dry conditions, was implemented for the Monaco Grand Prix in an effort to promote better racing. Teams were also mandated to use at least three sets of tyres in the races, with a minimum of two different tyre compounds for a dry race.

In response to concerns regarding damage to the tyres during the Qatar Grand Prix, a limit of 25 laps was introduced for each set of tyres. The 25 laps for each set of tyres did not have to be consecutive. As the Grand Prix was run over 57 laps, each driver going full race distance had to change tyres at least twice. Unlike the 2023 race, laps run under the safety car or virtual safety car (VSC) counted towards the limit.

== Season summary ==
=== Pre-season ===
As part of the series' celebration of the sport's 75th anniversary, all ten teams took part in a collective season launch event called F1 75 Live at The O2 Arena in London on 18 February 2025. Each team unveiled its car liveries for the season while its drivers and team principals were interviewed in front of a live audience. Additionally, other live entertainment and previews of the Formula One film were shown too. The event was broadcast live on Sky Sports in the United Kingdom and ESPN in the United States, as well as Formula One's social media accounts. On YouTube, the event surpassed viewership records of Formula One's previous live events, with 1.1 million concurrent viewers. A single pre-season test was held at the Bahrain International Circuit in Sakhir on 26–28 February. Carlos Sainz Jr., driving for Williams, set the fastest time in the three-day test.

=== Opening rounds ===
McLaren's Lando Norris took pole position for the season opening Australian Grand Prix, ahead of teammate Oscar Piastri and defending champion Max Verstappen, driving for Red Bull. The race was held under changing, intermediate conditions. The opening lap saw Verstappen move into second. The following laps saw Norris, Verstappen and Piastri keep close together, and opening a gap to George Russell in fourth. On lap 17, Verstappen made a mistake, running wide, allowing Piastri to overtake him for second. Verstappen would lose ground to the McLaren drivers quickly after this mistake. Norris and Piastri followed each other across the following laps although Piastri was unable to attempt to take the lead. A safety car for the crash of Fernando Alonso closed the field back together. On lap 44, another spell of rain hit the circuit, both McLaren cars ran wide at turn 13. Norris was able to rejoin the track in the lead, while Piastri was briefly stuck in the grass in the outside of the penultimate corner, dropping him to 15th. Norris was closely followed by Verstappen over the closing laps, but with Verstappen unable to overtake; he settled for second, behind Norris and with Russell finishing third. Piastri recovered to finish ninth. In the Drivers' Championship, Norris led on 25 points, breaking Verstappen's streak of consecutive days leading the Drivers' Championship, which the Red Bull driver had held since the 2022 Spanish Grand Prix. Verstappen was on 18 points, with Russell third on 15; Piastri was ninth on two points. In the Constructors' Championship, reigning champions McLaren were first on 27 points, with Mercedes second, also on 27, and Red Bull third on 18. Ferrari were seventh with 5 points.

Lewis Hamilton took sprint pole position for the Chinese Grand Prix, ahead of Verstappen and Piastri. Championship leader Norris qualified sixth for the sprint. In the sprint, Hamilton led from start to finish to take Ferrari's first sprint victory. Verstappen ran in second for most of the race, before being overtaken by Piastri in the closing laps. Piastri therefore finished second with Verstappen third. Norris dropped to ninth at the opening corner; he recovered to take the final points paying position in eighth. Piastri took pole for the main race, achieving his maiden career pole position, Russell qualified second ahead of Norris and Verstappen. At the race start, Russell initially attacked Piastri for the lead. Russell backed out; this allowed Norris into second. Leclerc and Hamilton both made it past Verstappen at the start. When the leaders made their pit stops on lap 18, Russell briefly took second from Norris, by way of an undercut, with Norris retaking the position within a lap. Verstappen moved back up into fifth when Hamilton made a second pit stop and moved into fourth by overtaking Leclerc on lap 53. From there, the top five remained unchanged with Piastri winning. Norris finished second, despite suffering a brake issue. Russell finished third ahead of Leclerc and Verstappen. Following the race, Charles Leclerc and Pierre Gasly were disqualified due to their cars being underweight, while Hamilton was disqualified for excessive skid wear on the bottom of his car. Following the race, Norris maintained his championship lead. Verstappen was second, eight points behind. Russell and Piastri were third and fourth, one and two points behind Verstappen respectively. In the Constructors' Standings, McLaren moved to 78 points, ahead of Mercedes on 57 and Red Bull on 36. Ferrari moved to fourth on 17 points.

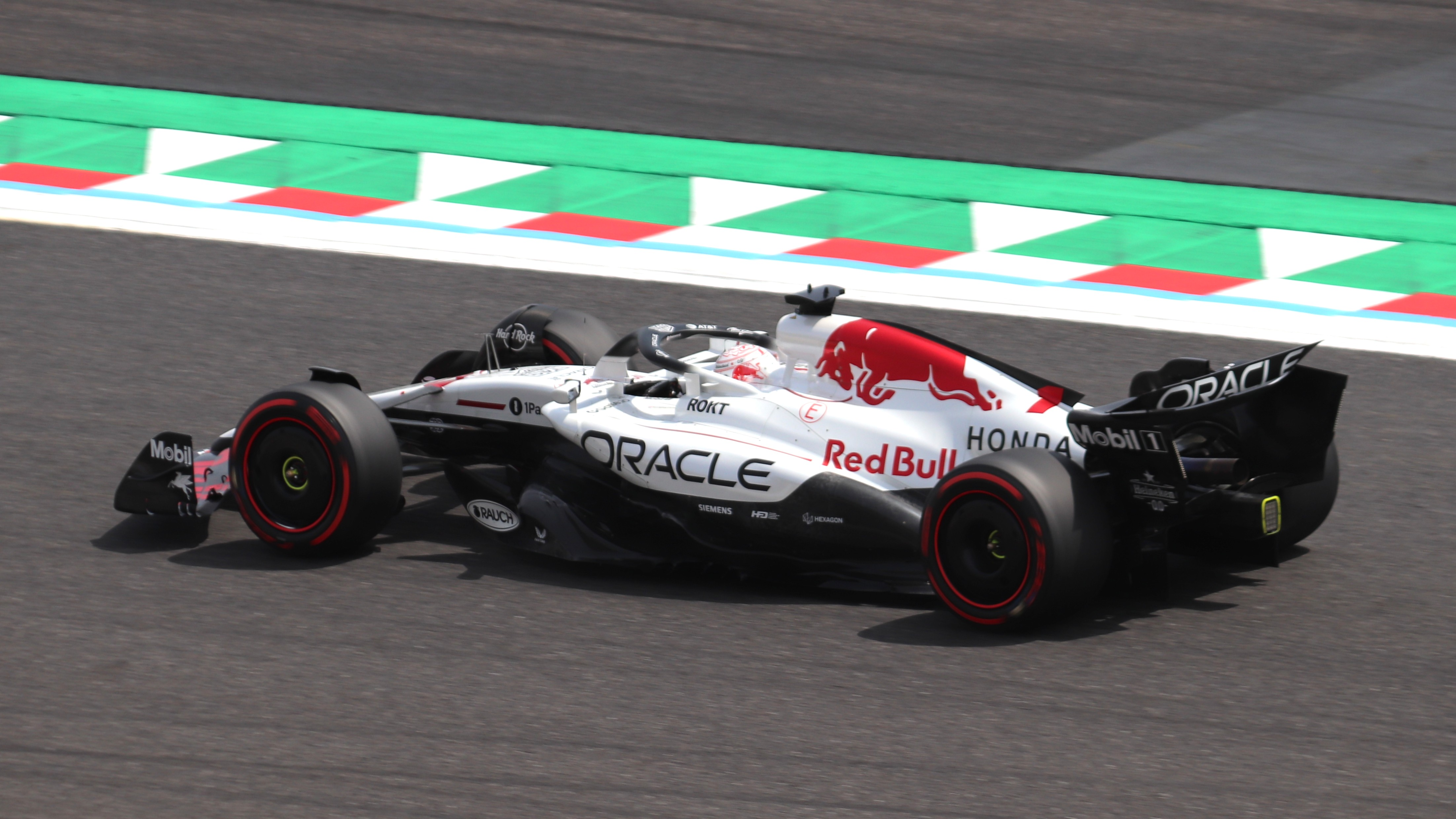
Max Verstappen at the Japanese Grand Prix in a special white Honda tribute livery, where he clinched his first of eight pole positions and Grand Prix wins of 2025.

Verstappen took his first pole position of the season at the Japanese Grand Prix, ahead of Norris and Piastri. The leading drivers maintained positions on the opening lap, with Verstappen pulling slightly ahead and the McLaren's running line astern. Verstappen and Norris both made pit stops on the same lap, Verstappen's stop was slightly slower and the two exited the pit lane side-by-side, Verstappen half a car length ahead. Norris ended up on the grass which allowed Verstappen to stay ahead. Norris complained that Verstappen forced him off the road, Verstappen defended himself by saying he had right of way. Race stewards did not investigate the incident. The top three remained unchanged after the pit stop phase. In the closing laps, Verstappen able to take the race win without a serious challenge for the lead. Piastri challenged Norris for second in the closing laps but was unable to take the place, resulting in Norris securing second and Piastri third. With the result, Norris' championship lead over Verstappen was cut to one point, Piastri moved into third, 13 points behind Norris. In the constructors, McLaren moved to 111 points, 36 ahead of Mercedes, 50 ahead of Red Bull and 76 ahead of Ferrari.

Piastri took his second pole position of the season at the Bahrain Grand Prix ahead of Russell and Leclerc; Norris and Verstappen qualified sixth and seventh. Piastri retained the lead at the race start, Norris moved up to third, although he received a time penalty for being out of position at the race start. Across the pit stop phase, Piastri maintained the race lead ahead of Russell and Norris, despite Norris taking his penalty during his pit stop. A slow stop for Verstappen saw him drop to eighth, before dropping to ninth. Norris dropped a place to Leclerc following a battle lasting several laps. Verstappen suffered another slow pit stop which dropped him to last, although drivers in front still needed to make pit stops. Verstappen would move back up to eighth following a safety car period. Norris temporarily dropped to fifth, behind Hamilton before overtaking first Hamilton and then Leclerc with 4 laps remaining, with Verstappen moving back into seventh. Across the closing four laps, Norris closed quickly on Russell, who was suffering technical difficulties, but was unable to overtake. Piastri therefore won, by 15 seconds, ahead of Russell and Norris with Verstappen moving into 6th with a late overtake. The result saw Piastri move into second in the Drivers' championship, three points behind Norris, Verstappen dropped to third, five points behind Piastri. In the Constructors' standings, McLaren moved to 151 points, with Mercedes on 93, Red Bull on 71, and Ferrari on 57.

Verstappen took his second pole position of the season at the Saudi Arabian Grand Prix, ahead of Piastri and Russell, while Norris crashed out in Q3, leaving him tenth. Piastri managed to pull alongside Verstappen going into the first corner of the race, with Verstappen managing to defend the race lead, but cutting the corner. Verstappen defended his actions arguing that "[Piastri] just forced me off." Verstappen was subsequently given a five-second time penalty for "leaving the track and gaining an advantage". By lap five, Norris had made his way up to eighth, with Verstappen and Piastri pulling away from Russell in third. Piastri moved ahead of Verstappen during the pit stop phase, courtesy of Verstappen having taken his penalty. The top five were: Piastri, Verstappen, Russell, Leclerc and Norris. Lap 38 of 50 saw Leclerc overtake Russell with Norris following him through two laps later. From there, the top five remained unchanged, with Piastri winning from Verstappen, Leclerc and Norris. Following the race, Piastri took the lead of the World Drivers' Championship for the first time in his career, making him the first Australian to lead the championship since his manager Mark Webber at the 2010 Japanese Grand Prix. Norris moved into second in the championship, 10 points behind, with Verstappen an additional two points behind in third. In the constructors' standings, McLaren's lead over Mercedes increased to 77 points, 99 points over Red Bull and 110 over Ferrari.

The Miami Grand Prix was the second sprint of the season. Antonelli took pole position for the sprint, ahead of Piastri, Norris and Verstappen. The sprint started in wet conditions, with Antonelli running wide at the first corner losing positions to Piastri, Norris and Verstappen. The top four kept in formation until the track dried out enough for drivers to move from wet-weather to dry-weather tyres. Antonelli and Verstappen both made pit stops on the same lap, with Red Bull releasing Verstappen into Antonelli. Antonelli's car was damaged and Verstappen received a ten-second time penalty. Piastri pitted shortly afterwards, allowing Norris into the lead. A safety car was then called following a crash for Fernando Alonso - Norris made his pit stop under safety car conditions, allowing him to overcut Piastri. From there the safety car took the drivers to the end, with Norris winning from Piastri and Hamilton. Verstappen's penalty meant he finished the race in last. For the Grand Prix, Verstappen took pole ahead of Norris, Antonelli and Piastri. The first corner saw Verstappen and Norris briefly alongside each other, contact between the pair saw Norris cut across the corner and drop to sixth. Piastri quickly made an overtake on Antonelli for second and Norris on Albon for fifth on lap 4, following a brief VSC (virtual safety car), with Norris also quickly dispatching Russell and Antonelli to climb to third by lap nine. Lap 11 saw Piastri close the gap and fight Verstappen for the race lead, on lap 14. Following this move, Verstappen was immediately put on the defensive against Norris, who made his own way past on lap 18; while this was happening, Piastri had built a race lead of nine seconds. The gap between Norris and Piastri remained stable, with Norris lead over Verstappen building to eight seconds by lap 24 and Verstappen losing time to the Mercedes duo behind. Antonelli was the first of the leading five to pit on lap 26, attempting to undercut Verstappen, but a slow stop meant Antonelli would not achieve this. Verstappen was the next of the leaders to pit before a second VSC was called. This allowed both McLaren's and Russell to stop, allowing Russell to take third from Verstappen. The closing laps saw Norris chase Piastri down for the win and Verstappen chase down Russell for third, but both were unsuccessful, with Piastri winning from Norris, Russell and Verstappen. The race result saw Piastri move to 131 points, 16 ahead of Norris and 32 ahead of Verstappen. In the constructors' standings, McLaren's lead over Mercedes grew to 105 points, with Red Bull an additional 36 points behind and Ferrari an additional 11 points back.

=== Mid-season rounds ===
The final running of the Emilia Romagna Grand Prix, saw Piastri take pole position ahead of Verstappen, Russell, and Norris. Piastri initially got a stronger launch of the start line, before Verstappen pulled off an overtake at the first turn, moving into the lead. Norris had been unable to overtake Russell at the race start, but was close behind, trying to take third place, making a successful move on lap 11. Piastri made his pit stop on lap 14, but lost time trying to overtake drivers who hadn't yet made their pit stops. Although Piastri maintained second over Norris across the pit stop phase, he lost time to Verstappen in the lead. A VSC was called on lap 33 following a retirement from Ocon, this triggered several drivers to make pit stops, including Verstappen making his first stop, and Piastri his second. This saw Verstappen leading from Norris, Albon, and Piastri in fourth. Piastri soon executed an overtake for third. A second safety car on lap 46 saw Verstappen and Norris both make second pit stops, and Piastri stayed out. Verstappen's lead was sufficient to retain first, with Piastri moving into second. At the restart, Norris made quick work of Piastri to move into second. The top three remained stable until the end, with Verstappen winning from Norris and Piastri. Following the round, Piastri retained his championship lead, but the gap was reduced to 13 points, with Verstappen an additional nine points back in third. In the constructors', McLaren's lead moved to 132 points over Mercedes and 148 over Red Bull.

The Monaco Grand Prix saw the introduction of a mandatory two-stop strategy in an effort to make the race more exciting. Norris took pole position for the event, ahead of Leclerc and Piastri, with Hamilton fourth and Verstappen fifth. Hamilton received a grid penalty post-qualifying, promoting Verstappen to fourth on the starting grid. There were no position changes at the front at the race start, which remained the case until the first phase of pit stops. During this phase, Piastri and Verstappen both attempted overcuts which proved to be unsuccessful. Norris, Leclerc and Piastri made their second stops on lap 49–51, maintaining the same order, while Verstappen continued to circulate. Verstappen would be caught by the leading three drivers before making his second mandatory pit stop in the closing laps, slotting back into fourth. It was therefore Norris who won, from Leclerc, Piastri and Verstappen. The strategy of some of the mid-field teams was to take advantage of the narrow nature of the track and have each car drive slower to deliberately create gaps for cars to make pit stops without losing too many positions. One of the drivers who employed the strategy, Alex Albon, admitted that he didn't like it and described as "messy". Russell, who deliberately cut a corner to overtake Albon, called it "flawed", with his penalty for corner cutting not impacting his finishing position. The rule for two pit stops was scrapped for 2026. Following the round, Piastri's championship lead was reduced to three points, and Verstappen had dropped to 25 points behind Piastri. In the Constructors' standings, McLaren moved to 319 points, 172 ahead of Mercedes and 176 ahead of Red Bull.

Oscar Piastri returned to pole position at the Spanish Grand Prix, ahead of Norris and Verstappen. After qualifying, Aston Martin withdrew Lance Stroll from the event. Stroll had been experiencing pain in his hands and wrist, believed to be related to a procedure he had in early 2023. Stroll underwent a medical procedure and returned in time to compete in the following round. Piastri held onto the race lead at the start, with Verstappen moving into second ahead of Norris. Norris retook second on the 13th lap, with Verstappen making his first pit stop on that lap. The early pit stop saw Verstappen undercut both McLaren drivers into the race lead after their pit stops on lap 22 and 23. Verstappen made his second pit stop on lap 29, indicating a three-stop strategy—this would mean he would make an additional stop in the race, but have fresher tyres to attack drivers in front of him. Verstappen made his third pit stop on lap 48, having closed the gap to Norris, with Norris responding the following lap. Norris rejoined the race still in second, only just in front of Verstappen. Piastri pitted the lap after that, emerging a couple of seconds ahead of Norris. A safety car was called to recover Antonelli's car, which had stopped with mechanical issues, and the leading drivers made additional pit stops. When the race resumed on lap 60, Verstappen suffered from oversteer. This allowed him to be overtaken by Leclerc, and he went side-by-side with Russell through the first corner. Verstappen took the escape road and maintained the position. Verstappen's team instructed him to allow Russell back through (to avoid a penalty for gaining an advantage off track) to which Verstappen protested that he maintained the position fairly. Verstappen slowed down on the run to turn 5, appearing to let Russell through around the outside of the corner. However, Verstappen returned to full speed before Russell completed the manoeuvre and the pair made contact. Verstappen received a ten-second time penalty for the collision, and Russell maintained fourth to the end. The race was therefore won by Piastri from Norris and Leclerc, with Russell fourth. Verstappen's penalty saw him drop to tenth. Verstappen later commentated that the collision "was not right and shouldn't have happened" and that "emotions can run high". In addition to his time penalty, he received three penalty points on his license, taking him to 11 in total. (Note: Penalty points remained on the licence for 12 months. 12 penalty points in a rolling 12 month period trigger a one race ban.) Following the round, Piastri's championship lead extended to 10 points over Norris, with Verstappen now an additional 39 points behind. In the Constructors', McLaren moved to 362 points. Ferrari jumped from fourth to second, on 165 points, 6 points ahead of Mercedes and 21 ahead of Red Bull.

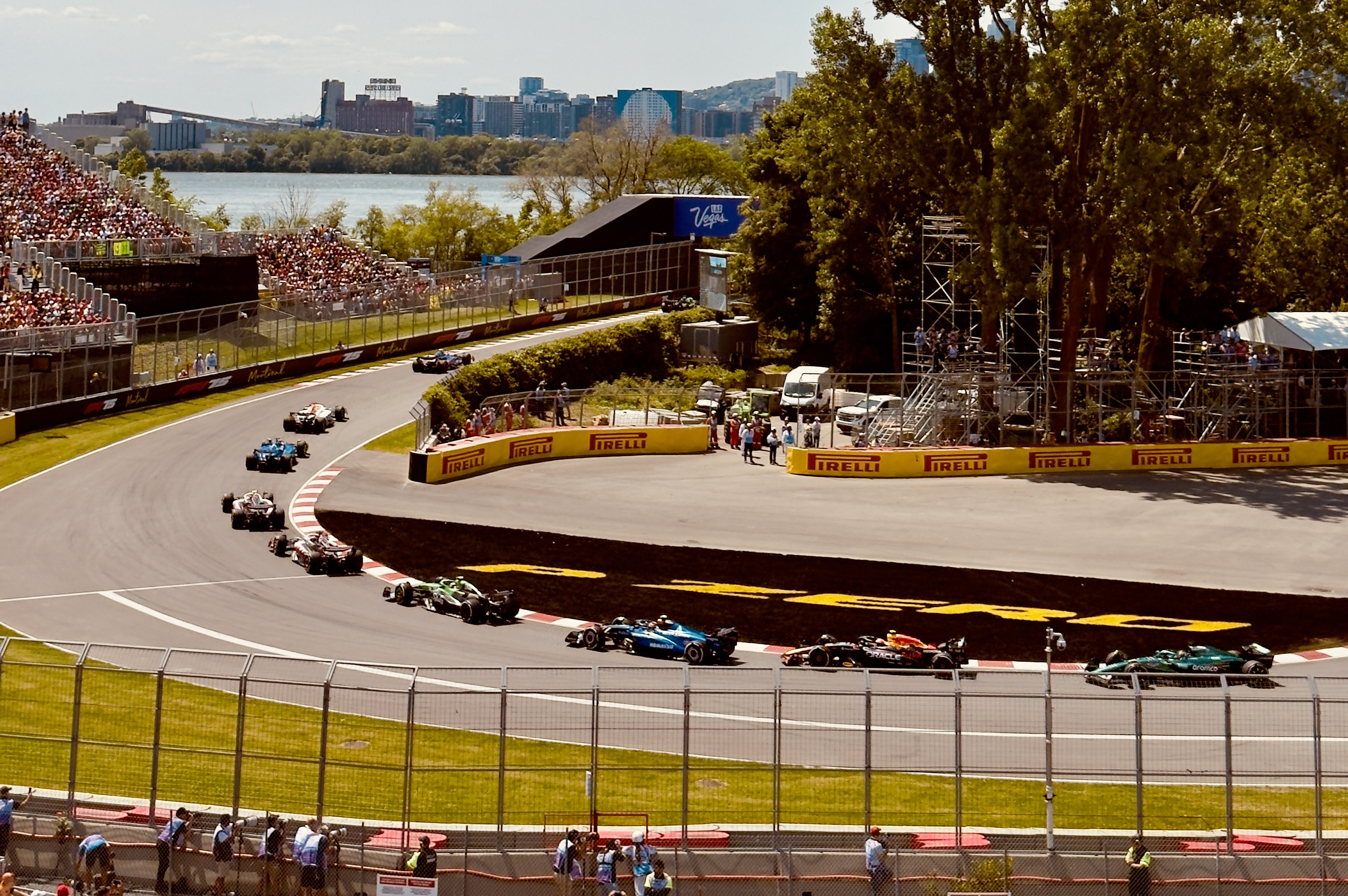
The opening lap of the Canadian Grand Prix. George Russell took Mercedes' first pole position and victory of the season in this event following a late safety car period, while teammate Kimi Antonelli scored his first podium.

Russell took pole at the Canadian Grand Prix, ahead of Verstappen and Piastri, with Norris in seventh, after making a mistake in his flying lap. The top two remained unchanged at the start, although Piastri lost a position to Antonelli. The order at the front remained largely unchanged through the opening pit phase, with Norris the only one to make gains, getting into fifth. Both pit stop phases were triggered by Verstappen coming in first, in both instances being caught by Antonelli before making a stop. Antonelli executed a successful overcut during the second pit stop but was quickly overtaken by Verstappen. Following the second pit stop, Verstappen cut into Russell's lead and Antonelli and Piastri fought for third, with Norris closing in. Norris closed the gap to Piastri setting up a battle between the two McLaren's. The battle concluded when Norris clipped the back of Piastri in the braking zone for turn one, resulting in terminal damage to Norris' car. Norris took the blame for the incident. The race was subsequently completed under safety car conditions, with Russell winning ahead of Verstappen and Antonelli, who claimed his maiden career podium. Following the race, Piastri extended his championship lead over Norris to 22 points. Verstappen, in third, closed on both of them, 21 points behind Norris. In the constructors' standings, McLaren moved to 374 points, ahead of Mercedes on 199 and Red Bull on 183.

Norris was back on pole position at the Austrian Grand Prix. Following an aborted start due to issues with Carlos Sainz Jr.'s brakes, the McLarens broke out ahead while Antonelli locked up and hit Verstappen, forcing both to retire and the safety car to be deployed; Verstappen's Red Bull teammate did not fare any better, with Tsunoda finishing sixteenth—the last of the finishing cars—after receiving a time penalty. Due to this, Red Bull failed to score any points of any kind, the first since the 2022 Bahrain Grand Prix. After leading a majority of the race, Norris converted pole position into his third win of the season ahead of teammate and championship leader Piastri, and Leclerc. Gabriel Bortoleto scored his first points in the championship while Hülkenberg finished ninth, marking the first double points finish for Sauber since the 2023 Qatar Grand Prix.

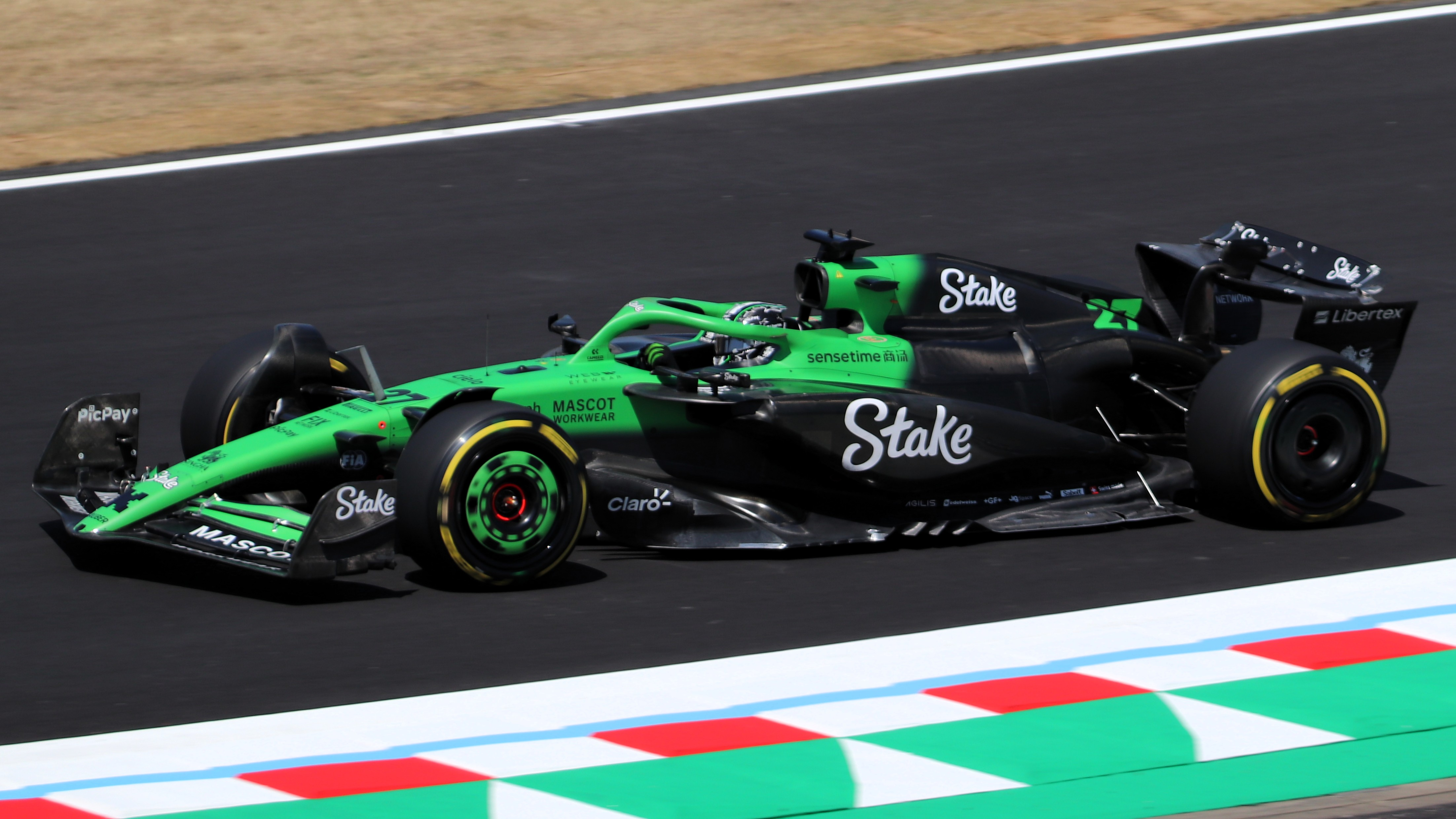
In his 239th race start, Nico Hülkenberg claimed his first podium by finishing third for Sauber at the British Grand Prix, setting a new record. It was also Sauber's first podium since the 2012 Japanese Grand Prix.

Verstappen found himself on pole position for the British Grand Prix after the cars he was battling with—the McLarens and Ferraris—made mistakes during their flying laps. The race began in wet conditions on intermediate tyres, but the Mercedes of Russell, Leclerc, Hadjar, Bortoleto, and Bearman opted to start from the pit lane after swapping to slick tyres following the formation lap. The slicks, however, were ineffective on the track, which remained damp. On the first few laps, green flag running was limited; Bearman's teammate Esteban Ocon squeezed himself between Tsunoda and Lawson, with the latter being the first to retire after suffering damage to his rear-left suspension. Soon afterwards, Bortoleto found himself in the wall with damage to his rear wing. During a sustained period of heavy rain, Hadjar had a heavy hit into Copse corner after ramming Antonelli's diffuser and spinning off the track, facilitating a safety car period. Race leader Oscar Piastri braked erratically during this safety car period and was awarded a ten-second time penalty. As the race entered its closing stages, the track began to dry, and drivers returned to slick tyres. With Piastri serving his penalty, Norris took the race lead; he went on to become the thirteenth British driver to win their home race. He finished ahead of Piastri and Nico Hülkenberg, the latter of whom enjoyed his first career Formula One podium after a record 239 race starts, starting from 19th and last on the grid.

Piastri took pole position at the Belgian Grand Prix sprint, but lost out to Red Bull's Verstappen. Norris then took pole position for the main race, which was delayed due to heavy rain. The race began under a rolling start behind the safety car, where Piastri immediately overtook Norris and held the lead to win the race as Leclerc finished in third.

Leclerc took his first pole position of the season for the Hungarian Grand Prix, ahead of the two McLarens. Norris went on to win the race and claim McLaren's 200th Grand Prix victory, after deciding to risk a one-stop strategy to get ahead of his teammate; title rival, Piastri, was on a two-stop strategy and finished second. George Russell completed the podium and finished third after battling with Leclerc.

Piastri took another pole position for the Dutch Grand Prix and led the race from start to finish, scoring his maiden career grand chelem ahead of Red Bull driver Max Verstappen and Racing Bulls driver Isack Hadjar, the latter achieving his maiden career podium after starting from fourth, his highest starting position to date. Three retirements were observed during the race, with both the Ferrari drivers hitting the wall at the banked turn 3—one by driver error and the other due to contact with Antonelli—and with Norris experiencing an oil leak on lap 65.

After taking the fastest pole position lap in Formula One history, Verstappen converted it into his and Red Bull's third win of the season at the Italian Grand Prix, ahead of Norris and Piastri. Controversial late-stage team orders were given to the latter, following his teammate's slow pit stop resulting in the former overtaking him for second. Alonso suffered the race's only retirement, after his Aston Martin suffered a suspension failure; Hülkenberg did not start the race after experiencing hydraulic issues, pulling into the pit lane with his Sauber.

=== Closing rounds ===
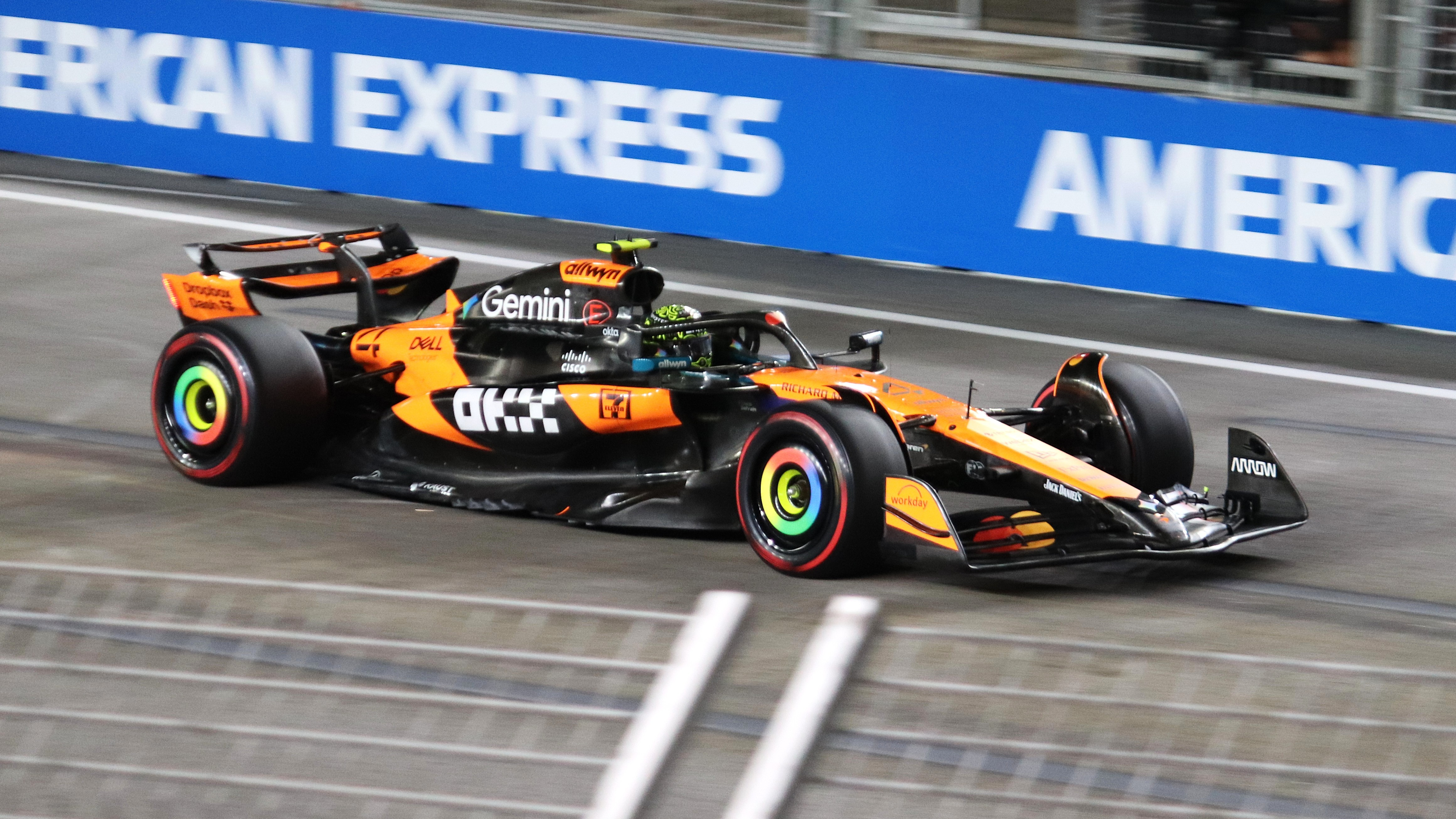
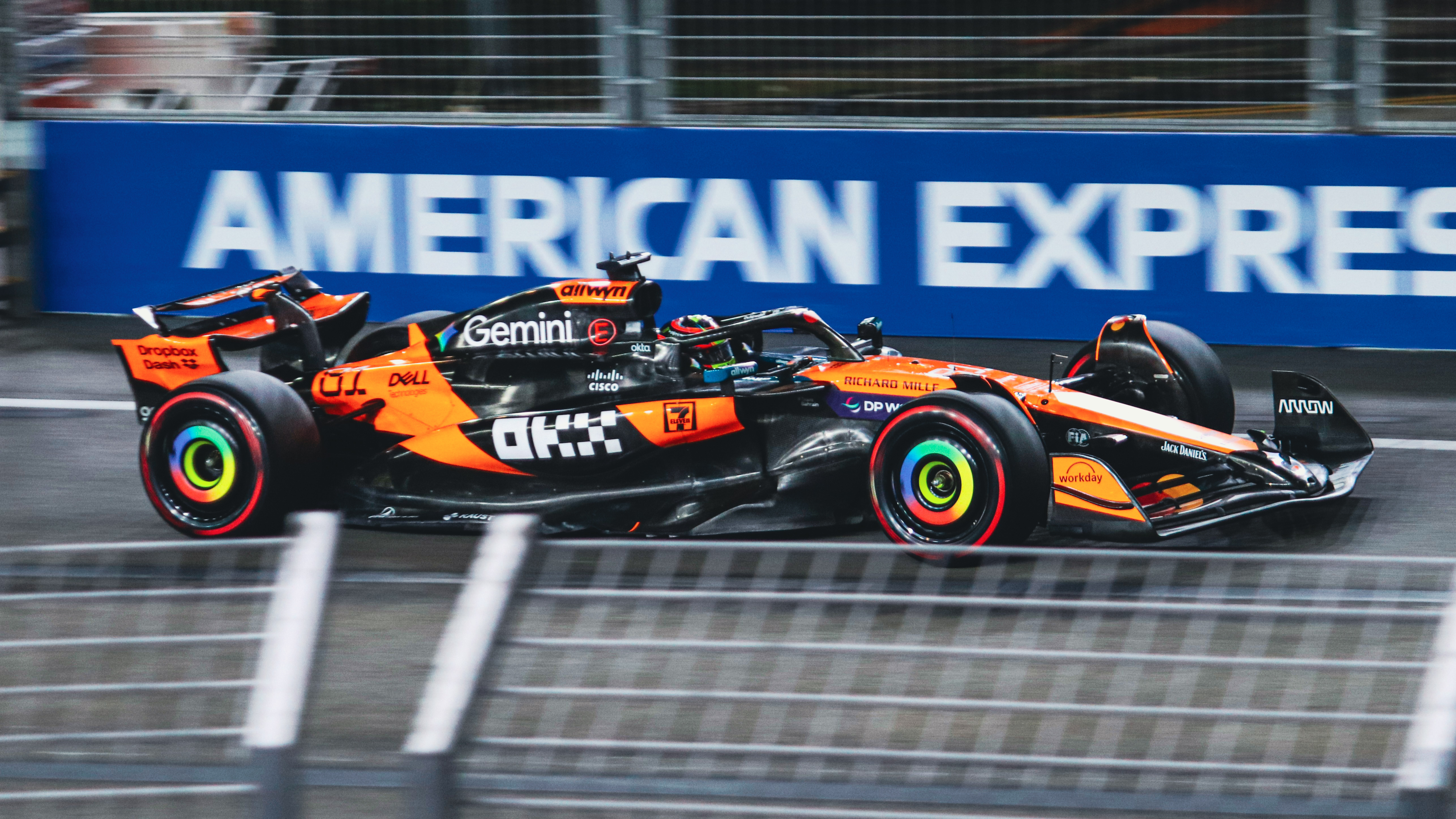
Lando Norris (top) claimed McLaren's 200th Grand Prix victory at the Hungarian Grand Prix. Oscar Piastri (bottom) had led the World Drivers' Championship for 15 rounds before relinquishing his lead to Norris at the Mexico City Grand Prix.

Verstappen converted his pole position at the Azerbaijan Grand Prix into his career sixth grand slam, and Red Bull's first consecutive win of the season. McLaren had an opportunity to secure the Constructors' Championship in this race, but was unable to. Norris did not score sufficient points and his teammate Piastri had a mistake-laden weekend as he crashed out in qualifying, jumped the race start, stalled, and dropped to last in an attempt to correct his mistake, before ultimately crashing out on the first lap. Carlos Sainz Jr., who started second, scored Williams's first podium since the rain-curtailed 2021 Belgian Grand Prix.

McLaren clinched the title at the Singapore Grand Prix, their tenth title and second in a row – the first time the team won consecutive championships since 1991. Meanwhile, Russell converted his pole position into his and Mercedes's second win of the season, with Verstappen finishing in second.

Verstappen dominated both the sprint and race at the United States Grand Prix from pole position, while the McLarens retired in the sprint, and finished second (Norris) and fifth (Piastri) in the race, narrowing the competition at the top of the Drivers' Championship. After a late safety car caused by Stroll during the sprint race, Sainz scored Williams's first sprint podium.

Norris converted pole position for the Mexico City Grand Prix to a win ahead of Leclerc and Verstappen. Piastri finished in fifth, which meant Norris took the lead of the Drivers' Championship by one point, the first time he led since the Bahrain Grand Prix. Holding off Piastri before a late virtual safety car period neutralised the race, Oliver Bearman recorded his highest career finish and a joint-best finish for Haas in fourth, matching Romain Grosjean's record at the 2018 Austrian Grand Prix.

Norris controlled both races at the São Paulo Grand Prix from pole position to further strengthen his lead in the Drivers' Championship, while Piastri crashed out of the sprint and finished fifth, and Verstappen finished fourth and third, the latter from a pit lane start, respectively. Gabriel Bortoleto had two sets of crashes with the walls which ended his races prematurely, the first one during the sprint thoroughly destroying his car and taking him out of qualifying, while Kimi Antonelli bettered his Canada result by consistently finishing in second in the sprint and the main race.

Norris took pole position for the Las Vegas Grand Prix, but made a mistake on the race start. Max Verstappen capitalised from the mistake to take a controlling lead and, eventually, his second win in Las Vegas. Norris and George Russell initially rounded off the podium, but following the race, Norris and teammate Piastri were disqualified due to a skid wear infringement, elevating Russell to second and Kimi Antonelli, who qualified seventeenth and carried a five-second penalty to the line, to third. The disqualification had a significant impact on the Drivers' Championship, as it tied the amount of points between Verstappen and Piastri, with Norris's gap being reduced to only 24 points.

Piastri won the Qatar Grand Prix sprint race from pole position, while Verstappen won the main race from third on the grid. Following an early safety car deployment, McLaren used a different strategy compared to the rest of the grid, offsetting Norris and Piastri from the rest of the grid. Third-placed Sainz scored his second podium of the season with Williams, securing the team's highest finishing position since 2017. Norris had the possibility of clinching the championship from the race but did not finish high enough in comparison to Verstappen and Piastri. Verstappen's win moved him up to second in the Drivers' Championship, 12 points behind Norris. Piastri moved down to third, four points behind Verstappen.

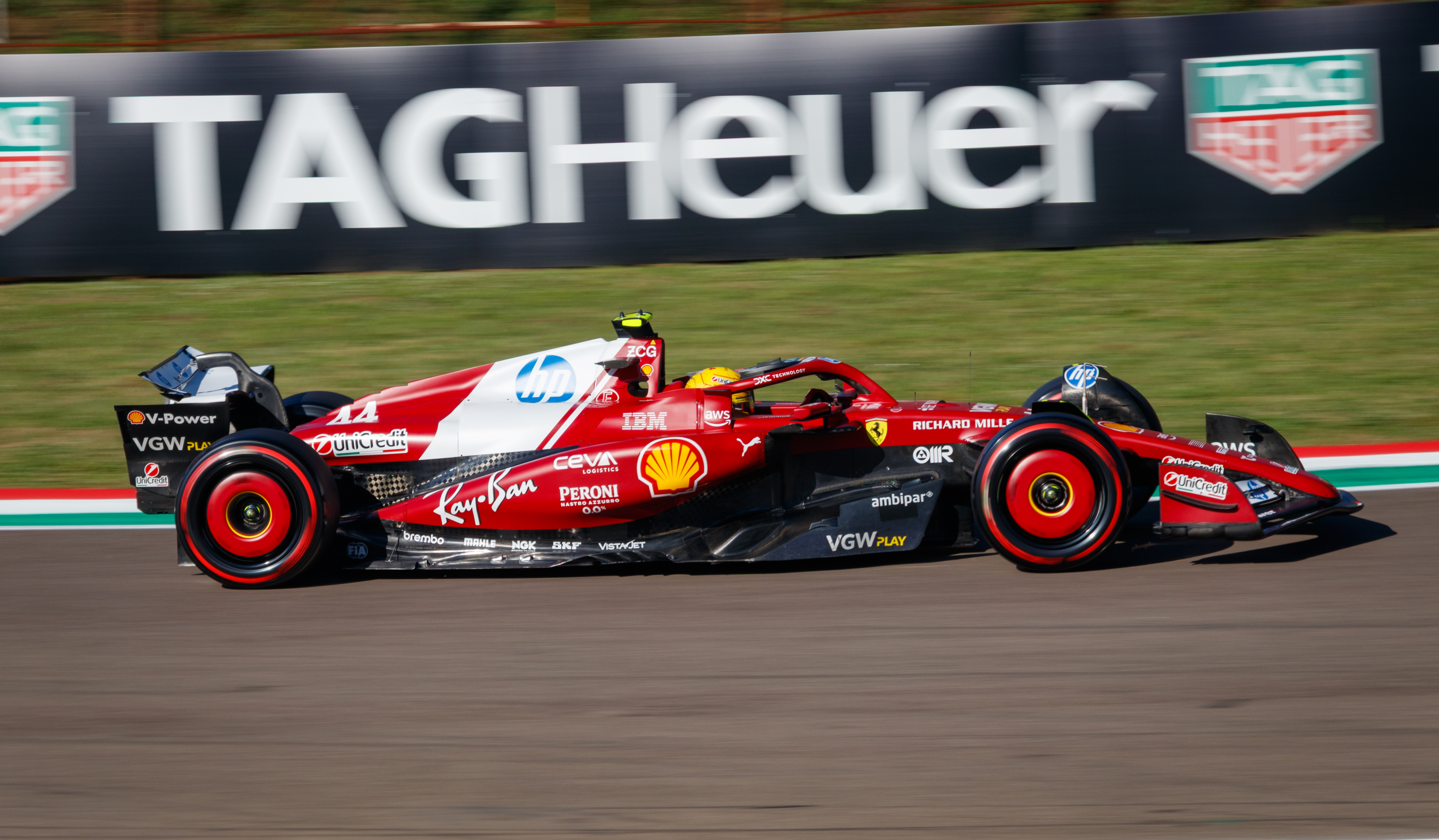
Despite much anticipation in his first year driving for Ferrari, Lewis Hamilton failed to make a Grand Prix podium for the first time in his career, and the first time for a Ferrari driver since 2014.

Norris, Verstappen and Piastri all entered the Abu Dhabi Grand Prix with a chance to win the Drivers' Championship. Verstappen qualified on pole position, ahead of Norris in second and Piastri in third. Piastri overtook Norris for second halfway through the first lap. Norris faced pressure from behind by Charles Leclerc, and was later investigated for overtaking Red Bull's Yuki Tsunoda off the track. Tsunoda was penalised for the incident, and the top three held onto their positions by the end of the race. Verstappen won the race from pole position, with Piastri in second and Norris in third. Norris clinched his first World Championship, securing McLaren's first Drivers' Championship since 2008 also becoming the 35th different driver in 75-year history of the sport to win the title. Norris is also the eleventh Briton to win an F1 drivers' title and the eighth McLaren driver to achieve this feat.

== Results and standings ==
=== Grands Prix ===
Round	Grand Prix (Note: The Chinese, Miami, Belgian, United States, São Paulo and Qatar Grands Prix featured the sprint format.)	Pole position	Fastest lap	Winning driver	Winning constructor	Report
1	(Australia) Australian Grand Prix	(United Kingdom) Lando Norris	(United Kingdom) Lando Norris	(United Kingdom) Lando Norris	(United Kingdom) McLaren-Mercedes	Report
2	(China) Chinese Grand Prix	(Australia) Oscar Piastri	(United Kingdom) Lando Norris (Note: Lewis Hamilton originally set the fastest lap, but was later disqualified as the thickness of the plank assembly was below the minimum thickness required. Lando Norris, initially having the second-fastest lap, was recognised for setting the fastest lap of the race.)	(Australia) Oscar Piastri	(United Kingdom) McLaren-Mercedes	Report
3	(Japan) Japanese Grand Prix	(Netherlands) Max Verstappen	(Italy) Kimi Antonelli	(Netherlands) Max Verstappen	(Austria) Red Bull Racing-Honda RBPT	Report
4	Bahrain Grand Prix	(Australia) Oscar Piastri	(Australia) Oscar Piastri	(Australia) Oscar Piastri	(United Kingdom) McLaren-Mercedes	Report
5	(Saudi Arabia) Saudi Arabian Grand Prix	(Netherlands) Max Verstappen	(United Kingdom) Lando Norris	(Australia) Oscar Piastri	(United Kingdom) McLaren-Mercedes	Report
6	(United States) Miami Grand Prix	(Netherlands) Max Verstappen	(United Kingdom) Lando Norris	(Australia) Oscar Piastri	(United Kingdom) McLaren-Mercedes	Report
7	(Italy) Emilia Romagna Grand Prix	(Australia) Oscar Piastri	(Netherlands) Max Verstappen	(Netherlands) Max Verstappen	(Austria) Red Bull Racing-Honda RBPT	Report
8	Monaco Grand Prix	(United Kingdom) Lando Norris	(United Kingdom) Lando Norris	(United Kingdom) Lando Norris	(United Kingdom) McLaren-Mercedes	Report
9	(Spain) Spanish Grand Prix	(Australia) Oscar Piastri	(Australia) Oscar Piastri	(Australia) Oscar Piastri	(United Kingdom) McLaren-Mercedes	Report
10	(Canada) Canadian Grand Prix	(United Kingdom) George Russell	(United Kingdom) George Russell	(United Kingdom) George Russell	(Germany) Mercedes	Report
11	(Austria) Austrian Grand Prix	(United Kingdom) Lando Norris	(Australia) Oscar Piastri	(United Kingdom) Lando Norris	(United Kingdom) McLaren-Mercedes	Report
12	(United Kingdom) British Grand Prix	(Netherlands) Max Verstappen	(Australia) Oscar Piastri	(United Kingdom) Lando Norris	(United Kingdom) McLaren-Mercedes	Report
13	(Belgium) Belgian Grand Prix	(United Kingdom) Lando Norris	(Italy) Kimi Antonelli	(Australia) Oscar Piastri	(United Kingdom) McLaren-Mercedes	Report
14	(Hungary) Hungarian Grand Prix	(Monaco) Charles Leclerc	(United Kingdom) George Russell	(United Kingdom) Lando Norris	(United Kingdom) McLaren-Mercedes	Report
15	(Netherlands) Dutch Grand Prix	(Australia) Oscar Piastri	(Australia) Oscar Piastri	(Australia) Oscar Piastri	(United Kingdom) McLaren-Mercedes	Report
16	(Italy) Italian Grand Prix	(Netherlands) Max Verstappen	(United Kingdom) Lando Norris	(Netherlands) Max Verstappen	(Austria) Red Bull Racing-Honda RBPT	Report
17	Azerbaijan Grand Prix	(Netherlands) Max Verstappen	(Netherlands) Max Verstappen	(Netherlands) Max Verstappen	(Austria) Red Bull Racing-Honda RBPT	Report
18	Singapore Grand Prix	(United Kingdom) George Russell	(United Kingdom) Lewis Hamilton	(United Kingdom) George Russell	(Germany) Mercedes	Report
19	United States Grand Prix	(Netherlands) Max Verstappen	(Italy) Kimi Antonelli	(Netherlands) Max Verstappen	(Austria) Red Bull Racing-Honda RBPT	Report
20	Mexico City Grand Prix	(United Kingdom) Lando Norris	(United Kingdom) George Russell	(United Kingdom) Lando Norris	(United Kingdom) McLaren-Mercedes	Report
21	(Brazil) São Paulo Grand Prix	(United Kingdom) Lando Norris	(Thailand) Alexander Albon	(United Kingdom) Lando Norris	(United Kingdom) McLaren-Mercedes	Report
22	(United States) Las Vegas Grand Prix	(United Kingdom) Lando Norris	(Netherlands) Max Verstappen	(Netherlands) Max Verstappen	(Austria) Red Bull Racing-Honda RBPT	Report
23	Qatar Grand Prix	(Australia) Oscar Piastri	(Australia) Oscar Piastri	(Netherlands) Max Verstappen	(Austria) Red Bull Racing-Honda RBPT	Report
24	(United Arab Emirates) Abu Dhabi Grand Prix	(Netherlands) Max Verstappen	(Monaco) Charles Leclerc	(Netherlands) Max Verstappen	(Austria) Red Bull Racing-Honda RBPT	Report

=== Scoring system ===
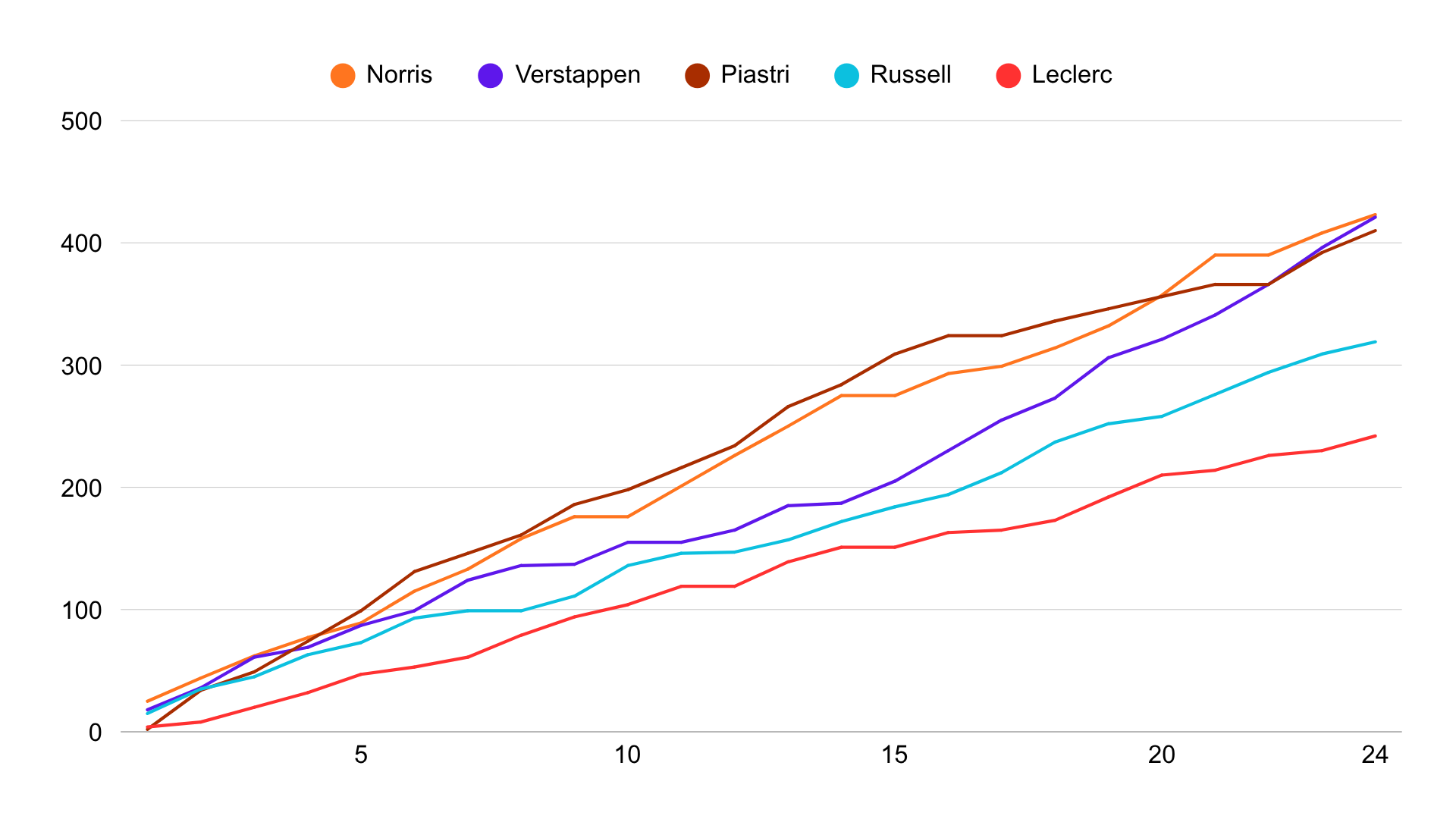
Cumulative points of the top five drivers

Points were awarded to the top ten classified drivers, and the top eight of the sprint. (Note: In the event of a race or sprint ending prematurely, the number of points paying positions could be reduced, depending on how much of the race or sprint had been completed.) In the case of a tie on points, a countback system was used where the driver with the most Grand Prix wins is ranked higher. If the number of wins was identical, then the number of second places was considered, and so on. Points were awarded using the following system:

Position	1st	2nd	3rd	4th	5th	6th	7th	8th	9th	10th
Race	25	18	15	12	10	8	6	4	2	1
Sprint	8	7	6	5	4	3	2	1		

=== World Drivers' Championship standings ===
Pos.	Driver	AUS (Australia)	CHN (China)	JPN (Japan)	BHR (Bahrain)	SAU (Saudi Arabia)	MIA (United States)	EMI (Italy)	MON (Monaco)	ESP (Spain)	CAN (Canada)	AUT (Austria)	GBR (United Kingdom)	BEL (Belgium)	HUN (Hungary)	NED (Netherlands)	ITA (Italy)	AZE (Azerbaijan)	SIN (Singapore)	USA (United States)	MXC (Mexico)	SAP (Brazil)	LVG (United States)	QAT (Qatar)	ABU (United Arab Emirates)	Points
1	(United Kingdom) Lando Norris	1^{P}^{F}	2^{8 F}	2	3	4^{F}	2^{1 F}	2	1^{P}^{F}	2	18†	1^{P}	1	2^{3 P}	1	18†	2^{F}	7	3	2	1^{P}	1^{1 P}	DSQ^{P}	4^{3}	3	423
2	(Netherlands) Max Verstappen	2	4^{3}	1^{P}	6	2^{P}	4^{P}	1^{F}	4	10	2	Ret	5^{P}	4^{1}	9	2	1^{P}	1^{P}^{F}	2	1^{1 P}	3	3^{4}	1^{F}	1^{4}	1^{P}	421
3	(Australia) Oscar Piastri	9	1^{2 P}	3	1^{P}^{F}	1	1^{2}	3^{P}	3	1^{P}^{F}	4	2^{F}	2^{F}	1^{2}	2	1^{P}^{F}	3	Ret	4	5	5	5	DSQ	2^{1 P F}	2	410
4	(United Kingdom) George Russell	3	3^{4}	5	2	5	3^{4}	7	11	4	1^{P}^{F}	5	10	5	3^{F}	4	5	2	1^{P}	6^{2}	7^{F}	4^{3}	2	6^{2}	5	319
5	(Monaco) Charles Leclerc	8	DSQ^{5}	4	4	3	7	6	2	3	5	3	14	3^{4}	4^{P}	Ret	4	9	6	3^{5}	2	Ret^{5}	4	8	4^{F}	242
6	(United Kingdom) Lewis Hamilton	10	DSQ^{1}	7	5	7	8^{3}	4	5	6	6	4	4	7	12	Ret	6	8	8^{F}	4^{4}	8	Ret^{7}	8	12	8	156
7	(Italy) Kimi Antonelli	4	6^{7}	6^{F}	11	6	6^{7}	Ret	18	Ret	3	Ret	Ret	16^{F}	10	16	9	4	5	13^{8 F}	6	2^{2}	3	5^{6}	15	150
8	(Thailand) Alexander Albon	5	7	9	12	9	5	5	9	Ret	Ret	Ret	8	6	15	5	7	13	14	14^{6}	12	11^{F}	Ret	11	16	73
9	(Spain) Carlos Sainz Jr.	Ret	10	14	Ret	8	9	8	10	14	10	DNS	12	18^{6}	14	13	11	3	10	Ret^{3}	17†	13	5	3^{8}	13	64
10	(Spain) Fernando Alonso	Ret	Ret	11	15	11	15	11	Ret	9	7	7	9	17	5	8	Ret	15	7	10	Ret	14^{6}	11	7^{7}	6	56
11	(Germany) Nico Hülkenberg	7	15	16	DSQ	15	14	12	16	5	8	9	3	12	13	14	DNS	16	20	8	Ret	9	7	Ret	9	51
12	(France) Isack Hadjar	DNS	11	8	13	10	11	9	6	7	16	12	Ret	20^{8}	11	3	10	10	11	16	13	8	6	18†	17	51
13	(United Kingdom) Oliver Bearman	14	8	10	10	13	Ret	17	12	17	11	11	11	11^{7}	Ret	6	12	12	9	9	4	6	10	Ret	12	41
14	(New Zealand) Liam Lawson	Ret	12	17	16	12	Ret	14	8	11	Ret	6	Ret	8	8	12	14	5	15	11	Ret	7	14	9	18	38
15	(France) Esteban Ocon	13	5	18	8	14	12	Ret	7	16	9	10	13	15^{5}	16	10	15	14	18	15	9	12	9	15	7	38
16	(Canada) Lance Stroll	6	9	20	17	16	16^{5}	15	15	WD	17	14	7	14	7	7	18	17	13	12	14	16	Ret	17†	10	33
17	(Japan) Yuki Tsunoda	12	16^{6}	12	9	Ret	10^{6}	10	17	13	12	16	15	13	17	9	13	6	12	7^{7}	11	17	12	10^{5}	14	33
18	(France) Pierre Gasly	11	DSQ	13	7	Ret	13^{8}	13	Ret	8	15	13	6	10	19	17	16	18	19	19	15	10^{8}	13	16	19	22
19	(Brazil) Gabriel Bortoleto	Ret	14	19	18	18	Ret	18	14	12	14	8	Ret	9	6	15	8	11	17	18	10	Ret	Ret	13	11	19
20	(Argentina) Franco Colapinto							16	13	15	13	15	DNS	19	18	11	17	19	16	17	16	15	15	14	20	0
21	(Australia) Jack Doohan	Ret	13	15	14	17	Ret																			0
Pos.	Driver	AUS (Australia)	CHN (China)	JPN (Japan)	BHR (Bahrain)	SAU (Saudi Arabia)	MIA (United States)	EMI (Italy)	MON (Monaco)	ESP (Spain)	CAN (Canada)	AUT (Austria)	GBR (United Kingdom)	BEL (Belgium)	HUN (Hungary)	NED (Netherlands)	ITA (Italy)	AZE (Azerbaijan)	SIN (Singapore)	USA (United States)	MXC (Mexico)	SAP (Brazil)	LVG (United States)	QAT (Qatar)	ABU (United Arab Emirates)	Points

Key
Colour	Result
Gold	Winner
Silver	Second place
Bronze	Third place
Green	Other points position
Blue	Other classified position
Blue	Not classified, finished (NC)
Purple	Not classified, retired (Ret)
Red	Did not qualify (DNQ)
Black	Disqualified (DSQ)
White	Did not start (DNS)
White	Race cancelled (C)
Blank	Did not practice (DNP)
Blank	Excluded (EX)
Blank	Did not arrive (DNA)
Blank	Withdrawn (WD)
Blank	Did not enter (empty cell)
Annotation	Meaning
P	Pole position
F	Fastest lap
Superscript number	Points-scoring position in sprint

Notes:

- † – Driver did not finish the Grand Prix, but was classified as he completed more than 90% of the race distance.

=== World Constructors' Championship standings ===
Pos.	Constructor	AUS (Australia)	CHN (China)	JPN (Japan)	BHR (Bahrain)	SAU (Saudi Arabia)	MIA (United States)	EMI (Italy)	MON (Monaco)	ESP (Spain)	CAN (Canada)	AUT (Austria)	GBR (United Kingdom)	BEL (Belgium)	HUN (Hungary)	NED (Netherlands)	ITA (Italy)	AZE (Azerbaijan)	SIN (Singapore)	USA (United States)	MXC (Mexico)	SAP (Brazil)	LVG (United States)	QAT (Qatar)	ABU (United Arab Emirates)	Points
1	(United Kingdom) McLaren-Mercedes	1^{P}^{F}	1^{2 P}	2	1^{P}^{F}	1	1^{2}	2	1^{P}^{F}	1^{P}^{F}	4	1^{P}	1	1^{2}	1	1^{P}^{F}	2^{F}	7	3	2	1^{P}	1^{1 P}	DSQ^{P}	2^{1 P F}	2	833
1	(United Kingdom) McLaren-Mercedes	9	2^{8 F}	3	3	4^{F}	2^{1 F}	3^{P}	3	2	18†	2^{F}	2^{F}	2^{3 P}	2	18†	3	Ret	4	5	5	5	DSQ	4^{3}	3	833
2	(Germany) Mercedes	3	3^{4}	5	2	5	3^{4}	7	11	4	1^{P}^{F}	5	10	5	3^{F}	4	5	2	1^{P}	6^{2}	6	2^{2}	2	5^{6}	5	469
2	(Germany) Mercedes	4	6^{7}	6^{F}	11	6	6^{7}	Ret	18	Ret	3	Ret	Ret	16^{F}	10	16	9	4	5	13^{8 F}	7^{F}	4^{3}	3	6^{2}	15	469
3	(Austria) Red Bull Racing-Honda RBPT	2	4^{3}	1^{P}	6	2^{P}	4^{P}	1^{F}	4	10	2	16	5^{P}	4^{1}	9	2	1^{P}	1^{P}^{F}	2	1^{1 P}	3	3^{4}	1^{F}	1^{4}	1^{P}	451
3	(Austria) Red Bull Racing-Honda RBPT	Ret	12	12	9	Ret	10^{6}	10	17	13	12	Ret	15	13	17	9	13	6	12	7^{7}	11	17	12	10^{5}	14	451
4	(Italy) Ferrari	8	DSQ^{1}	4	4	3	7	4	2	3	5	3	4	3^{4}	4^{P}	Ret	4	8	6	3^{5}	2	Ret^{5}	4	8	4^{F}	398
4	(Italy) Ferrari	10	DSQ^{5}	7	5	7	8^{3}	6	5	6	6	4	14	7	12	Ret	6	9	8^{F}	4^{4}	8	Ret^{7}	8	12	8	398
5	(United Kingdom) Williams-Mercedes	5	7	9	12	8	5	5	9	14	10	Ret	8	6	14	5	7	3	10	14^{6}	12	11^{F}	5	3^{8}	13	137
5	(United Kingdom) Williams-Mercedes	Ret	10	14	Ret	9	9	8	10	Ret	Ret	DNS	12	18^{6}	15	13	11	13	14	Ret^{3}	17†	13	Ret	11	16	137
6	(Italy) Racing Bulls-Honda RBPT	12	11	8	13	10	11	9	6	7	16	6	Ret	8	8	3	10	5	11	11	13	7	6	9	17	92
6	(Italy) Racing Bulls-Honda RBPT	DNS	16^{6}	17	16	12	Ret	14	8	11	Ret	12	Ret	20^{8}	11	12	14	10	15	16	Ret	8	14	18†	18	92
7	(United Kingdom) Aston Martin Aramco-Mercedes	6	9	11	15	11	15	11	15	9	7	7	7	14	5	7	18	15	7	10	14	14^{6}	11	7^{7}	6	89
7	(United Kingdom) Aston Martin Aramco-Mercedes	Ret	Ret	20	17	16	16^{5}	15	Ret	WD	17	14	9	17	7	8	Ret	17	13	12	Ret	16	Ret	17†	10	89
8	(United States) Haas-Ferrari	13	5	10	8	13	12	17	7	16	9	10	11	11^{7}	16	6	12	12	9	9	4	6	9	15	7	79
8	(United States) Haas-Ferrari	14	8	18	10	14	Ret	Ret	12	17	11	11	13	15^{5}	Ret	10	15	14	18	15	9	12	10	Ret	12	79
9	(Switzerland) Kick Sauber-Ferrari	7	14	16	18	15	14	12	14	5	8	8	3	9	6	14	8	11	17	8	10	9	7	13	9	70
9	(Switzerland) Kick Sauber-Ferrari	Ret	15	19	DSQ	18	Ret	18	16	12	14	9	Ret	12	13	15	DNS	16	20	18	Ret	Ret	Ret	Ret	11	70
10	(France) Alpine-Renault	11	13	13	7	17	13^{8}	13	13	8	13	13	6	10	18	11	16	18	16	17	15	10^{8}	13	14	19	22
10	(France) Alpine-Renault	Ret	DSQ	15	14	Ret	Ret	16	Ret	15	15	15	DNS	19	19	17	17	19	19	19	16	15	15	16	20	22
Pos.	Constructor	AUS (Australia)	CHN (China)	JPN (Japan)	BHR (Bahrain)	SAU (Saudi Arabia)	MIA (United States)	EMI (Italy)	MON (Monaco)	ESP (Spain)	CAN (Canada)	AUT (Austria)	GBR (United Kingdom)	BEL (Belgium)	HUN (Hungary)	NED (Netherlands)	ITA (Italy)	AZE (Azerbaijan)	SIN (Singapore)	USA (United States)	MXC (Mexico)	SAP (Brazil)	LVG (United States)	QAT (Qatar)	ABU (United Arab Emirates)	Points

Key
Colour	Result
Gold	Winner
Silver	Second place
Bronze	Third place
Green	Other points position
Blue	Other classified position
Blue	Not classified, finished (NC)
Purple	Not classified, retired (Ret)
Red	Did not qualify (DNQ)
Black	Disqualified (DSQ)
White	Did not start (DNS)
White	Race cancelled (C)
Blank	Did not practice (DNP)
Blank	Excluded (EX)
Blank	Did not arrive (DNA)
Blank	Withdrawn (WD)
Blank	Did not enter (empty cell)
Annotation	Meaning
P	Pole position
F	Fastest lap
Superscript number	Points-scoring position in sprint

Notes:

- † – Driver did not finish the Grand Prix, but was classified as he completed more than 90% of the race distance.
- Rows are not related to the drivers: within each constructor, individual Grand Prix standings are sorted purely based on the final classification in the race (not by total points scored in the event, which includes points awarded for the sprint).
