= Red Bull Racing RB21 =

2025 Formula One car

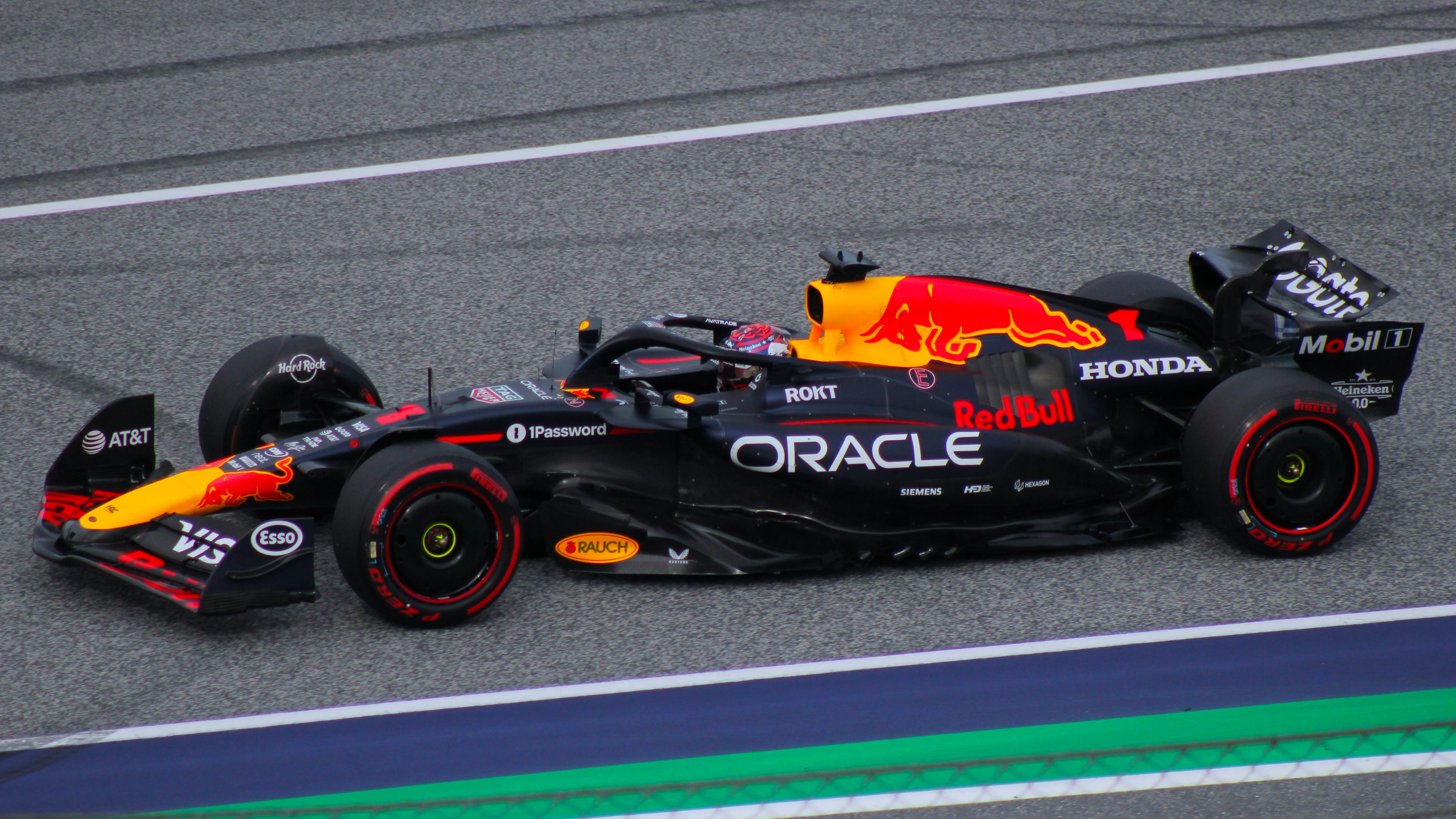
- Max Verstappen driving the RB21 during the Austrian Grand Prix
- Category: Formula One
- Constructor: Red Bull Racing (chassis); Honda Racing Corporation (power unit)
- Designers: Pierre Waché (Technical Director); Ben Waterhouse (Head of Performance Engineering); Paul Monaghan (Chief Engineer, Car Engineering); Craig Skinner (Chief Designer); Jerome Lafarge (Chief Designer, Composites and Structures); Edward Aveling (Chief Designer, Mechanical and Systems); Alistair Brizell (Head of Vehicle Performance); Enrico Balbo (Head of Aerodynamics); Toyoharu Tanabe (Power Unit Technical Director - Honda)
- Predecessor: Red Bull RB20
- Successor: Red Bull RB22

Technical specifications
- Suspension (front): Multi-link pull-rod actuated dampers and anti-roll bar
- Suspension (rear): Double wishbone push-rod springs, dampers, and anti-roll bar
- Engine: Honda RBPTH003 1.6 L (98 cu in) direct injection V6 turbocharged engine limited to 15,000 rpm in a rear mid-mounted, rear-wheel-drive layout
- Electric motor: Honda Kinetic and thermal energy recovery systems
- Battery: Honda Lithium-ion battery
- Power: 1,020 hp (750 kw)
- Weight: 800 kg (including driver, excluding fuel)
- Fuel: Esso / Mobil Synergy
- Lubricants: Mobil 1
- Tyres: Pirelli P Zero (Dry); Pirelli Cinturato (Wet)

Competition history
- Notable entrants: Oracle Red Bull Racing
- Notable drivers: 1. (Netherlands) Max Verstappen; 30. (New Zealand) Liam Lawson; 22. (Japan) Yuki Tsunoda
- Debut: 2025 Australian Grand Prix
- First win: 2025 Japanese Grand Prix
- Last win: 2025 Abu Dhabi Grand Prix
- Last event: 2025 Abu Dhabi Grand Prix
Races	Wins	Podiums	Poles	F/Laps
24	8	15	8	3

The Red Bull Racing RB21 is a Formula One car which was designed and constructed by Red Bull Racing and competed exclusively in the 2025 Formula One World Championship. It was driven by defending World Champion Max Verstappen, who was joined by Liam Lawson and Yuki Tsunoda, the latter replacing Lawson from the Japanese Grand Prix. The RB21, which was powered by the Honda RBPTH003 power unit, is the last Red Bull Racing car to be powered by Honda RBPT-badged engines, with Honda returning in a fully fledged capacity for the forthcoming new power unit rules and switching to powering the rival Aston Martin team from 2026. From the 2026 season, Red Bull and its sister team Racing Bulls have utilised Red Bull Powertrains Ford engines. The RB21 was the first Red Bull Racing car since the RB2 to not be designed by former Chief Technical Officer Adrian Newey, and the first car to be designed by Technical Director Pierre Waché who is now overseeing all aspects of any future Red Bull challengers from design to production with the RB21 being the first car for which he oversaw both the design and production process. Two mid-season upgrades for the car have been introduced overall: first a package at Imola, and the second at Monza.

The RB21 followed the WDC-winning RB20. Red Bull had a turbulent season: the car was initially off the pace of the pace-setting McLaren MCL39, with both drivers reporting issues during pre-season tests. While Verstappen remained competitive by opening the season with a podium in Australia, and taking victories in Japan and Imola, the second seat fared much worse: Lawson initially held the seat until China, after which he was demoted back to Racing Bulls and replaced by Tsunoda. Persistent issues with the car, coupled with the underperformance of Tsunoda, resulted in Red Bull getting knocked out of contention after the Azerbaijan Grand Prix. Verstappen brought himself back into contention for the Drivers' Championship after winning the United States, Las Vegas, Qatar and Abu Dhabi Grands Prix, taking three consecutive victories. However, he was unable to secure the title with title rival Lando Norris securing it at the latter event by two points.

The car achieved eight wins, fifteen podiums, eight pole positions, and three fastest laps in Grands Prix, plus two sprint wins, all with Verstappen.

== Background ==
=== Livery ===
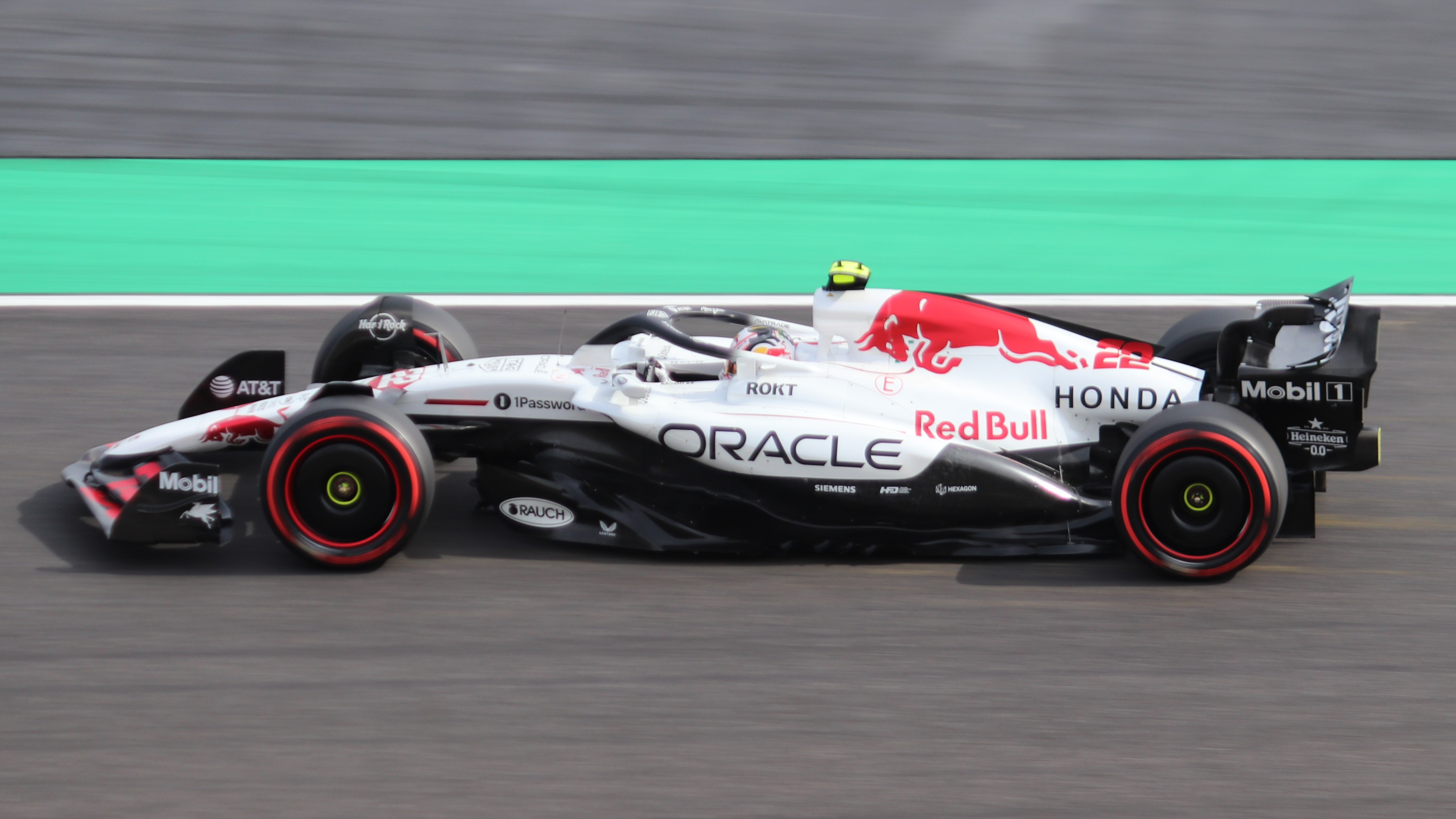
Tsunoda at his home race, the Japanese Grand Prix. The RB21 featured a special white livery imitating the colours of the Honda RA272 commemorating Red Bull's partnership with Honda.

The livery of the car was unveiled at the F1 75 event at The O2 Arena, along with other teams, on 18 February 2025. The livery was similar to previous liveries, but with minor sponsorship changes.

At the Japanese Grand Prix, the RB21 featured a variation of the White Bull designed used at the 2021 Turkish Grand Prix, commemorating the final year of their partnership with Honda. The designed featured a matte white finish with satin red logos, emulating the racing colours of Japan.

At the 2025 Emilia Romagna Grand Prix, both cars were run with numbers in the style of the 2005-2013 Red Bull cars to commemorate their 400th Grand Prix.

== Competition and development history of the RB21 ==
Red Bull performed 304 laps around Bahrain International Circuit during pre-season testing. Following the testing, Verstappen concluded that, due to the lower average amount of completed laps - being the lowest of the ten teams overall - the team had 'work to do', with Lawson stating there were "teething gremlins" with the new car.

=== Opening rounds ===
Verstappen and Lawson

Red Bull's driver lineup for the first two races of 2025 consisted of defending champion Max Verstappen, who was paired with rookie Liam Lawson. Lawson previously raced part-time in 2023 and 2024 for two iterations of Red Bull's sister team - Scuderia AlphaTauri and Visa Cash App RB - both times replacing Daniel Ricciardo. Lawson first appeared in Red Bull and AlphaTauri's first free practice sessions starting from the 2022 Belgian Grand Prix.

During qualifying for the Australian Grand Prix, title rivals McLaren locked out the front row, with Verstappen having to settle for third. Meanwhile, Lawson was eliminated in Q1, starting eighteenth but moving to the pit lane following setup changes under parc fermé. After Oscar Piastri spun out, Verstappen moved up one spot to finish in second. Soon afterward, Lawson retired due to hitting the same wall where RB debutant Isack Hadjar retired on earlier during the formation lap. The following Chinese Grand Prix was a sprint weekend; Verstappen qualified second, and finished third. Verstappen found himself in fourth in qualifying and when he crossed the line to finish just off the podium. Meanwhile, Lawson endured two last-place qualifications in the same weekend, with a pit lane start for the main race, and finished fourteenth in the sprint and fifteenth but becoming twelfth after three post-race disqualifications - after which Red Bull opened discussions to replace Lawson.

Verstappen and Tsunoda

During the week leading up to the Japanese Grand Prix, Red Bull unveiled a special livery for their RB21 that pays homage to the national racing colours of Japan. Ahead of the race, Yuki Tsunoda was announced to be Lawson's replacement, with the latter dropping back to Racing Bulls. However, Tsunoda disappointed on his Red Bull debut and qualified fifteenth and finished twelfth while Verstappen took Red Bull's first pole position and win of the season. Red Bull had a weak Bahrain Grand Prix, with Verstappen qualifying seventh, enduring slow pit stops, and recovering to sixth, and Tsunoda qualifying tenth, striking Carlos Sainz Jr.'s Williams and causing the latter to retire, and finishing ninth. Verstappen took pole position at the Saudi Arabian Grand Prix, but conceded the lead to Piastri after a move into turn one that exceeded track limits saw him penalised. Meanwhile, Tsunoda qualified seventh, hit another car, this time former AlphaTauri teammate Pierre Gasly, now of Alpine, and retired on the opening lap.

Red Bull brought the first upgrades to the car for the Miami Grand Prix. Verstappen qualified fourth, and Tsunoda eighteenth, for the sprint. However, Verstappen was unsafely released into Mercedes' Kimi Antonelli, which broke his front wing and netted him a penalty he was unable to serve. Due to a safety car intervention after Fernando Alonso was hit by Lawson, which ended as eventual winner Lando Norris crossed the line, Verstappen dropped to last, which marked the first time he finished out of the points in any race format since the 2016 Belgian Grand Prix. Having started from the pit lane following further setup changes, Tsunoda finished in sixth. For the main race, Verstappen took pole position but dropped to fourth, while Tsunoda qualified and finished in tenth.

=== Mid-season rounds ===
The car sported another major upgrade package, and special numbers inspired by their earlier liveries for Red Bull Racing's 400th Grand Prix entry, the Emilia Romagna Grand Prix, but a heavy crash between Tsunoda and the wall at turn six destroyed both and ruled him out of qualifying, with him starting from the pit lane following a total rebuild of his RB21. However, Verstappen, who started second, salvaged a win following a move into turn one, with Tsunoda making up ten places to score one point. Due to the heavy damage sustained in his crash during qualifying, Tsunoda had to run a spare chassis without any upgrades, with the effects being felt as late as the Belgian Grand Prix.

Despite being off the pace, with a twelfth-placed Tsunoda exiting early in Q2 and Verstappen qualifying fourth, Red Bull had a relatively clean Monaco Grand Prix. (Note: Compared to Red Bull's last three Monaco Grands Prix, where a car of theirs has had an incident in a session: 2022 2023 2024) After the first pit stop phase, Verstappen was shuffled into first and led a majority of the race. He and Red Bull banked on a late-stage disruption (either via safety car or red flag) to get his second stop - this time free - out of the way, but it did not come. Due to the new regulation surrounding Monaco's forced two-stop strategy, Verstappen was called to do his second stop on the penultimate lap, releasing a scant Lando Norris into the clean air he needed to shake a chasing Charles Leclerc off his back. Verstappen ended up finishing in fourth, and Tsunoda ended up falling to seventeenth, two laps down. Tsunoda qualified last at the Spanish Grand Prix, with Verstappen in third. During the race itself, Verstappen was behind both McLarens, and after a late safety car, was set on the hard compound. He had issues heating up his tyres and was then involved in a notable collision incident with George Russell of Mercedes, which netted him a ten-second penalty that dropped him to tenth; Tsunoda started from the pitlane and finished thirteenth. Due to Russell finishing in fourth, Verstappen only scoring one point, and Tsunoda coming out of the race without points, Red Bull dropped to fourth in the Constructors' Championship, behind Mercedes. Verstappen was pipped to pole position by Russell at the Canadian Grand Prix, with Tsunoda in eleventh. While Verstappen finished second, Tsunoda finished in twelfth.

Verstappen found himself disappointed in the car's lack of balance for the Austrian Grand Prix, culminating in a late-stage spin in the third practice session. Tsunoda continued to show a lack of pace when he qualified in eighteenth; Verstappen did not fair any better, with his final run in Q3 being interrupted by a spinning Alpine. He was left in seventh, being outqualified by sister team driver Liam Lawson. However, Kimi Antonelli would be the cause of his retirement in the race itself, after the Mercedes rookie locked his W16's brakes and sent himself right into Verstappen's path, resulting in a lap one retirement for both drivers and a safety car period. Tsunoda continued on but lacked the pace to move up the field, battling against Franco Colapinto in a move that saw the former penalised and finishing last of the finishers, two laps down. Ultimately, Red Bull Racing failed to score any points at their home Grand Prix, the first time this has happened since the 2022 Bahrain Grand Prix.

Verstappen at the Italian Grand Prix, where he took his third victory of the year.

The British Grand Prix offered no respite for both Red Bull drivers. Verstappen suffered from ride imbalance over the three practice sessions, but the team modified his rear wing prior to qualification to run a low-downforce setup. While the setup paid dividends in the dry qualification session, with Verstappen taking pole position ahead of both McLarens and Tsunoda down in twelfth, the race itself was held in rainy conditions, and due to parc fermé, did not change the setup lest he join Franco Colapinto in the pit lane. This, coupled with the car's poor tyre degradation and the track drying fast with Verstappen on quickly-overheating intermediates, led to another bout of ride imbalance during the race; being challenged by the McLarens, he was unable to mount a successful defense against both drivers. He jumped Norris through means of the McLaren driver achieving a slow pit stop, and after the rain-induced second safety car period, lost his rear end into Stowe and dropped all the way down to tenth. He attributed this spin towards persistent handling issues. Verstappen recovered to fifth, while Tsunoda did not fare any better, finishing last of the finishing cars in fifteenth.

Verstappen won the Belgian Grand Prix sprint event, and finished in fourth in the Grand Prix, with Tsunoda qualifying eleventh and finishing twelfth during the sprint and a highest of seventh and finishing thirteenth for the race. Red Bull left the Hungaroring with mediocre results. Their Hungarian Grand Prix saw Tsunoda knocked out in Q1 once again, and Verstappen qualify in eighth - just behind (Note: Verstappen: 1:15.728; Bortoleto 1:15.725) the Sauber of Gabriel Bortoleto. Verstappen dropped a place across the line to finish ninth, behind sister team driver Liam Lawson. Tsunoda scored no points. The Dutch Grand Prix saw an uptick in form: Verstappen returned to the podium in second place from a starting position of third, with Tsunoda in ninth after starting twelfth; Verstappen would better his result at the Italian Grand Prix, taking his third win of the season from pole position, with Tsunoda in thirteenth. Verstappen's win means the first race win since Laurent Mekies stepped up as Red Bull's team principal.

=== Closing rounds ===
Verstappen converted his pole position at the Azerbaijan Grand Prix to his second consecutive victory and Red Bull's fourth victory of the season, while Tsunoda finished in sixth. However, they were knocked out of contention from the Constructors' Championship. Verstappen started and finished second behind the dominant George Russell of Mercedes in Singapore while defending his position from Lando Norris of the quicker McLaren, while Tsunoda finished twelfth. The United States Grand Prix brought out further dominance from Verstappen, winning both the sprint and main race from pole position to score maximum points as his championship challenge against the McLaren drivers began to ignite. Meanwhile, Tsunoda showed consistency by finishing in seventh in both races.

Tsunoda finished 12th at the Las Vegas Grand Prix.

At the Mexico City Grand Prix Verstappen qualified fifth, and Tsunoda eleventh. The two drivers finished third and eleventh, respectively. Verstappen was involved in a turn-one incident where he was forced into the grass; he did not report any damages to his underbody. The São Paulo Grand Prix was a sprint weekend, so Verstappen qualified sixth and Tsunoda eighteenth, and finished fourth and thirteenth respectively. However, during the main race, Verstappen qualified sixteenth, and Tsunoda nineteenth, marking Red Bull's first Q1 exit since 2006. Verstappen opted to start from the pit lane, and after surviving an early puncture recovered to third. Tsunoda finished last of the remaining drivers, in seventeenth. Verstappen won the Las Vegas Grand Prix from second, and the Qatar Grand Prix from third, reigniting his title chances going into the Abu Dhabi Grand Prix. Verstappen won the race from pole position, but was outscored overall by Norris, who won his first title.

The car remained at Yas Marina Circuit for post-season testing, including tests related to the regulation changes scheduled for 2026. Both Verstappen and Tsunoda opted to sit out, so Red Bull fielded Isack Hadjar in the mule car adapted to simulate the 2026 cars to test tyres for sole supplier Pirelli, while Ayumu Iwasa drove the regular specification.

== Complete Formula One results ==
Key

Key
Colour	Result
Gold	Winner
Silver	Second place
Bronze	Third place
Green	Other points position
Blue	Other classified position
Blue	Not classified, finished (NC)
Purple	Not classified, retired (Ret)
Red	Did not qualify (DNQ)
Black	Disqualified (DSQ)
White	Did not start (DNS)
White	Race cancelled (C)
Blank	Did not practice (DNP)
Blank	Excluded (EX)
Blank	Did not arrive (DNA)
Blank	Withdrawn (WD)
Blank	Did not enter (empty cell)
Annotation	Meaning
P	Pole position
F	Fastest lap
Superscript number	Points-scoring position in sprint

Year	Entrant	Power unit	Tyres	Driver name	Grands Prix																								Points	WCC pos.
Year	Entrant	Power unit	Tyres	Driver name	AUS	CHN	JPN	BHR	SAU	MIA	EMI	MON	ESP	CAN	AUT	GBR	BEL	HUN	NED	ITA	AZE	SIN	USA	MXC	SAP	LVG	QAT	ABU	Points	WCC pos.
2025	Red Bull Racing	Honda RBPTH003	P	(Netherlands) Max Verstappen	2	4^{3}	1^{P}	6	2^{P}	4^{P}	1^{F}	4	10	2	Ret	5^{P}	4^{1}	9	2	1^{P}	1^{P}^{F}	2	1^{1 P}	3	3^{4}	1^{F}	1^{4}	1^{P}	451	3rd
2025	Red Bull Racing	Honda RBPTH003	P	(New Zealand) Liam Lawson	Ret	12																							451	3rd
2025	Red Bull Racing	Honda RBPTH003	P	(Japan) Yuki Tsunoda			12	9	Ret	10^{6}	10	17	13	12	16	15	13	17	9	13	6	12	7^{7}	11	17	12	10^{5}	14	451	3rd
