= 2026 Australian Grand Prix =

First round of the 2026 F1 season

Race 1 of 23 (Note: At the time of the event Formula One planned to hold twenty-four Grands Prix.) in the 2026 Formula One World Championship
Next race →
- Layout of the Melbourne Grand Prix Circuit

Race details
- Date: 8 March 2026
- Official name: Formula 1 Qatar Airways Australian Grand Prix 2026
- Location: Albert Park Circuit, Melbourne, Victoria, Australia
- Course: Temporary street circuit
- Course length: 5.278 km (3.280 miles)
- Distance: 58 laps, 306.124 km (190.217 miles)
- Weather: Partly cloudy. Max. ambient temp. 25.4°C, max. track temp. 39.1°C.
- Attendance: 483,934

Pole position
Driver	(United Kingdom) George Russell	Mercedes
- Time: 1:18.518

Fastest lap
Driver	(Netherlands) Max Verstappen	Red Bull Racing-Red Bull Ford
- Time: 1:22.091 on lap 43

Podium
First	(United Kingdom) George Russell	Mercedes
Second	(Italy) Kimi Antonelli	Mercedes
Third	(Monaco) Charles Leclerc	Ferrari

The 2026 Australian Grand Prix (officially known as the Formula 1 Qatar Airways Australian Grand Prix 2026) was a Formula One motor race that was held on 8 March 2026 at the Albert Park Circuit in Melbourne, Victoria, Australia. It was the first round of the 2026 Formula One World Championship, which brought about major regulation changes revolving around the chassis and power unit.

After surviving an early-stage battle against Ferrari's Charles Leclerc, polesitter George Russell led teammate Kimi Antonelli to Mercedes's 61st 1–2 finish. Leclerc rounded out the podium for Ferrari ahead of teammate Lewis Hamilton; both drivers led for at least one lap during the Grand Prix. Russell's win made this the first time he led the Drivers' Championship; his team Mercedes led the Constructors' Championship.

== Background ==
The event was held at Albert Park Circuit in Melbourne for the 29th time in the circuit's history, across the weekend of 6–8 March. As the first round of the 2026 Formula One World Championship, the Grand Prix was the first to be held with the new regulation set – which entailed major changes to the chassis and power unit – for 2026, and marked the 40th running of the Australian Grand Prix as a round of the Formula One World Championship.

=== Entrants ===
The drivers and teams were the same as the season entry list with no additional stand-in drivers for the race. Arvid Lindblad made his debut as a full-time driver with Racing Bulls, while Cadillac and Audi made their Formula One debuts. Cadillac's entry as the eleventh team made this the first Formula One race with 11 teams since the season ending 2016 Abu Dhabi Grand Prix.

After last supplying Jaguar, Jordan and Minardi in 2004, Ford returned to the grid after a 21-year absence, supplying Red Bull and Racing Bulls through Red Bull Powertrains. Honda made their full return to the sport after having pulled out following the 2021 season, supplying engines to Aston Martin. After acquiring the Sauber team, Audi made their Formula One debut, supplying their own power unit.

=== Tyre choices ===
Tyre supplier Pirelli brought the C3, C4, and C5 tyre compounds (the three softest in their range) designated hard, medium, and soft, respectively, for teams to use at the event.

== Practice ==
Three free practice sessions were held for the event. The first free practice session was held on 6 March 2026, at 12:30 local time (UTC+11), and was topped by Charles Leclerc (Ferrari) ahead of his teammate Lewis Hamilton and Max Verstappen (Red Bull). The second free practice session was held on the same day, at 16:00 local time, and was topped by Oscar Piastri (McLaren) ahead of Mercedes duo of Kimi Antonelli and George Russell. The third free practice session was held on 7 March 2026, it was originally scheduled to start at 12:30 local time before being delayed by 20 minutes due to a crash in the F3 round. It was topped by Russell ahead of Hamilton and Leclerc. Red flags were brought out due the stoppages of Carlos Sainz Jr. (Williams) and Antonelli on track, the former due to a power loss and the latter due to a heavy crash.

== Qualifying ==
Qualifying was held on 7 March 2026, at 16:00 local time (UTC+11), and determined the starting grid order for the race.

=== Qualifying report ===
A red flag was flown after during the opening segment after Max Verstappen (Red Bull) locked his rear axle braking into the opening corner, sending him into a high speed spin into the gravel. He did not set a time, leaving him in twentieth ahead of Carlos Sainz Jr. (Williams) and Lance Stroll (Aston Martin), neither of whom went out due to power unit issues. The crash benefitted Kimi Antonelli (Mercedes), whose car was repaired during the red flag period, following his crash during the final practice session. While the second session ran without issues, another red flag was observed early into the third session after Antonelli was released with two cooling devices attached to his car. While the first device was rolled into the turn one gravel trap, the second fell off on a straight and was run over by Lando Norris (McLaren), damaging his front wing endplate and creating debris which needed to be removed.

Mercedes recorded their first front-row lockout since the 2024 British Grand Prix. George Russell's pole lap of 1:18.518 was eight-tenths faster than third-placed Isack Hadjar's (Red Bull) 1:19.303. The BBC said Mercedes's qualifying advantage sent "shockwaves through the paddock". After the race, Charles Leclerc (Ferrari) commented that the gap in race pace would not be quite as large.

=== Qualifying classification ===
Pos.	No.	Driver	Constructor	Qualifying times			Final grid
Pos.	No.	Driver	Constructor	Q1	Q2	Q3	Final grid
1	63	(United Kingdom) George Russell	Mercedes	1:19.507	1:18.934	1:18.518	1
2	12	(Italy) Kimi Antonelli	Mercedes	1:20.120	1:19.435	1:18.811	2
3	6	(France) Isack Hadjar	Red Bull Racing-Red Bull Ford	1:20.023	1:19.653	1:19.303	3
4	16	(Monaco) Charles Leclerc	Ferrari	1:20.226	1:19.357	1:19.327	4
5	81	(Australia) Oscar Piastri	McLaren-Mercedes	1:19.664	1:19.525	1:19.380	5
6	1	(United Kingdom) Lando Norris	McLaren-Mercedes	1:20.010	1:19.882	1:19.475	6
7	44	(United Kingdom) Lewis Hamilton	Ferrari	1:19.811	1:19.921	1:19.478	7
8	30	(New Zealand) Liam Lawson	Racing Bulls-Red Bull Ford	1:20.491	1:20.144	1:19.994	8
9	41	(United Kingdom) Arvid Lindblad	Racing Bulls-Red Bull Ford	1:20.409	1:19.971	1:21.247	9
10	5	(Brazil) Gabriel Bortoleto	Audi	1:20.495	1:20.221	No time	10
11	27	(Germany) Nico Hülkenberg	Audi	1:21.024	1:20.303	N/A	11
12	87	(United Kingdom) Oliver Bearman	Haas-Ferrari	1:21.247	1:20.311	N/A	12
13	31	(France) Esteban Ocon	Haas-Ferrari	1:20.759	1:20.491	N/A	13
14	10	(France) Pierre Gasly	Alpine-Mercedes	1:21.138	1:20.501	N/A	14
15	23	(Thailand) Alexander Albon	Atlassian Williams-Mercedes	1:21.051	1:20.941	N/A	15
16	43	(Argentina) Franco Colapinto	Alpine-Mercedes	1:21.200	1:21.270	N/A	16
17	14	(Spain) Fernando Alonso	Aston Martin Aramco-Honda	1:21.969	N/A	N/A	17
18	11	(Mexico) Sergio Pérez	Cadillac-Ferrari	1:22.605	N/A	N/A	18
19	77	(Finland) Valtteri Bottas	Cadillac-Ferrari	1:23.244	N/A	N/A	19
107% time: 1:25.072
—	3	(Netherlands) Max Verstappen	Red Bull Racing-Red Bull Ford	No time	N/A	N/A	20^{a}
—	55	(Spain) Carlos Sainz Jr.	Atlassian Williams-Mercedes	No time	N/A	N/A	21^{a}
—	18	(Canada) Lance Stroll	Aston Martin Aramco-Honda	No time	N/A	N/A	22^{a}

Notes

- ^a – Max Verstappen, Carlos Sainz Jr. and Lance Stroll failed to set a time during qualifying. They were permitted to race at the stewards' discretion.

== Race ==
The race was held on 8 March 2026, at 15:00 local time (UTC+11), and was run for 58 laps.

=== Race report ===
20 of the 22 entrants started the race. Nico Hülkenberg's Audi suffered technical issues before the start. Oscar Piastri crashed his McLaren on a reconnaissance lap after experiencing an unexpected power surge.

At the start, the Ferrari cars shot forward. Polesitter George Russell found himself sandwiched between Ferrari's Charles Leclerc and Lewis Hamilton; Russell's teammate Kimi Antonelli briefly dropped to seventh. Over the next several laps, Russell and Leclerc repeatedly exchanged the lead. Russell used his electric boosts to overpower Leclerc at various turns, but this drained his battery, allowing Leclerc to respond tit-for-tat with his own boosts and retake the lead each time. On lap 11, Isack Hadjar, on his debut for the Red Bull team, retired with an engine issue, triggering a virtual safety car (VSC). Both Mercedes drivers pitted, while both Ferrari drivers stayed out. Ferrari planned a one-stop strategy and was hoping to pit later in the race to gain the tyre advantage over the faster Mercedes; this decision left Mercedes racing in clear air and Russell rapidly cut into the Ferraris' lead on track.

From there, Mercedes controlled the race. The next VSC came on lap 16, when the Cadillac of Valtteri Bottas retired with mechanical issues. By this time, Russell was too close for Ferrari to pit and retain the lead, and the pit lane was closed to recover Bottas's car before either Ferrari could make a pit stop. Ferrari made their pitstop midway through the race without the benefit of a safety car, allowing Russell and Antonelli to take first and second place. Russell and Antonelli saw off the challenge and completed the race on 46-lap-old hard tyres. Despite Ferrari's tyre delta advantage, Russell posted essentially identical lap times to Leclerc after the latter pitted, prompting Leclerc to comment that Mercedes was hiding its true pace.

In the closing laps, Antonelli cut Russell's lead from six seconds to three, and Hamilton closed in on Leclerc, but neither was able to overtake their teammate, and the top three was formed by Russell, Antonelli and Leclerc. This marked Mercedes's first 1–2 finish since the 2024 Las Vegas Grand Prix, which Russell also won. With his victory, Russell picked up his sixth victory in Formula One, and led the Drivers' Championship for the first time in his career.

Finishing fifth and sixth were the last two World Champions, McLaren's Lando Norris and Red Bull's Max Verstappen, the latter recovering from twentieth place at the start. The two drivers had a lengthy duel in the final half of the race, though Verstappen suffered tyre wear and dropped off at the end. The Haas of Oliver Bearman took seventh and Arvid Lindblad, making his debut in Formula One, finished eighth in his Racing Bulls. Gabriel Bortoleto of Audi scored that team's first Formula One points in ninth. Rounding out the top ten, Pierre Gasly of Alpine picked up the final point of the day after holding off Haas's Esteban Ocon.

Sergio Pérez recorded Cadillac's first-ever finish in his return to Formula One. Also noted was the 43-lap stint of Lance Stroll; due to the ongoing development difficulties at Aston Martin-Honda, neither car had been expected to complete more than 25 laps. His teammate Fernando Alonso had an explosive start, passing seven drivers, but retired the car.

=== Post-race ===
Russell's victory allowed him to take the lead of the Drivers' Championship, making him the first Mercedes driver to do so since Lewis Hamilton led the standings following the 2021 Russian Grand Prix. Mercedes led the Constructors' Championship standings for the first time since the 2021 Abu Dhabi Grand Prix, where they won the Constructors' Championship. Ferrari trailed behind them with 27 points, with McLaren holding ten.

=== Race classification ===
Pos.	No.	Driver	Constructor	Laps	Time/Retired	Grid	Points
1	63	(United Kingdom) George Russell	Mercedes	58	1:23:06.801	1	25
2	12	(Italy) Kimi Antonelli	Mercedes	58	+2.974	2	18
3	16	(Monaco) Charles Leclerc	Ferrari	58	+15.519	4	15
4	44	(United Kingdom) Lewis Hamilton	Ferrari	58	+16.144	7	12
5	1	(United Kingdom) Lando Norris	McLaren-Mercedes	58	+51.741	6	10
6	3	(Netherlands) Max Verstappen	Red Bull Racing-Red Bull Ford	58	+54.617	20	8
7	87	(United Kingdom) Oliver Bearman	Haas-Ferrari	57	+1 lap	12	6
8	41	(United Kingdom) Arvid Lindblad	Racing Bulls-Red Bull Ford	57	+1 lap	9	4
9	5	(Brazil) Gabriel Bortoleto	Audi	57	+1 lap	10	2
10	10	(France) Pierre Gasly	Alpine-Mercedes	57	+1 lap	14	1
11	31	(France) Esteban Ocon	Haas-Ferrari	57	+1 lap	13	
12	23	(Thailand) Alexander Albon	Atlassian Williams-Mercedes	57	+1 lap	15	
13	30	(New Zealand) Liam Lawson	Racing Bulls-Red Bull Ford	57	+1 lap	8	
14	43	(Argentina) Franco Colapinto	Alpine-Mercedes	56	+2 laps	16	
15	55	(Spain) Carlos Sainz Jr.	Atlassian Williams-Mercedes	56	+2 laps	21	
16	11	(Mexico) Sergio Pérez	Cadillac-Ferrari	55	+3 laps	18	
NC	18	(Canada) Lance Stroll	Aston Martin Aramco-Honda	43	+15 laps^{a}	22	
Ret	14	(Spain) Fernando Alonso	Aston Martin Aramco-Honda	21	Vibrations	17	
Ret	77	(Finland) Valtteri Bottas	Cadillac-Ferrari	15	Fuel system	19	
Ret	6	(France) Isack Hadjar	Red Bull Racing-Red Bull Ford	10	Engine	3	
DNS	81	(Australia) Oscar Piastri	McLaren-Mercedes	0	Accident	—^{b}	
DNS	27	(Germany) Nico Hülkenberg	Audi	0	Hydraulics	—^{b}	

Notes

- ^a – Lance Stroll was not classified as he did not complete 90% of the race distance.
- ^b – Oscar Piastri and Nico Hülkenberg did not start the race, the former due to crashing during a reconnaissance lap, and the latter due to a mechanical problem. Their places on the grid were left vacant.

== Championship standings after the race ==
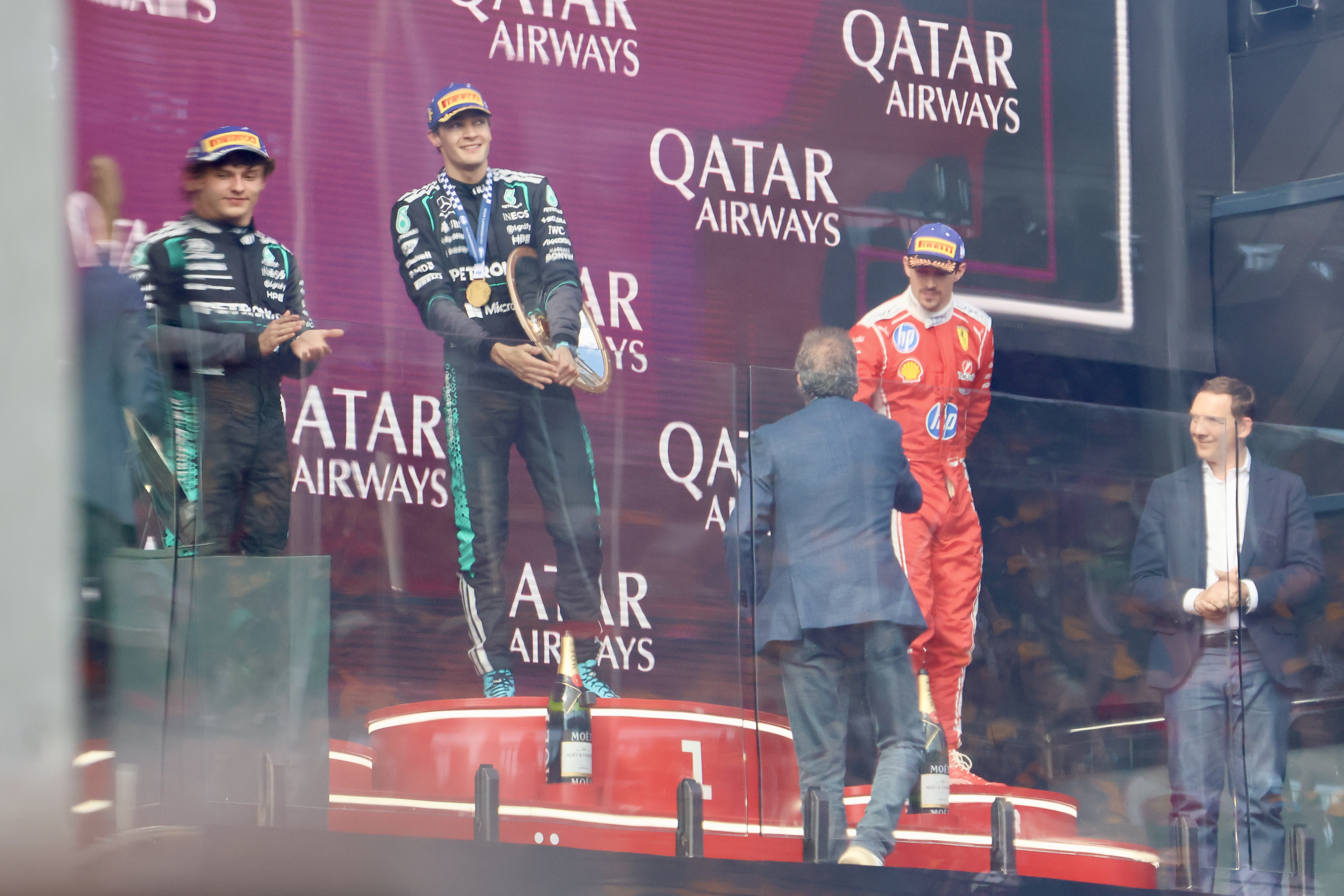
The podium ceremony at the end of the race

Drivers' Championship standings

Pos.	Driver	Points
1	(United Kingdom) George Russell	25
2	(Italy) Kimi Antonelli	18
3	(Monaco) Charles Leclerc	15
4	(United Kingdom) Lewis Hamilton	12
5	(United Kingdom) Lando Norris	10

Constructors' Championship standings

Pos.	Constructor	Points
1	(Germany) Mercedes	43
2	(Italy) Ferrari	27
3	(United Kingdom) McLaren-Mercedes	10
4	(Austria) Red Bull Racing-Red Bull Ford	8
5	(United States) Haas-Ferrari	6

- Note: Only the top five positions are included for both sets of standings.

== See also ==
- 2026 Melbourne Formula 2 round
- 2026 Melbourne Formula 3 round

== Notes ==
Previous race: 2025 Abu Dhabi Grand Prix	FIA Formula One World Championship; 2026 season	Next race: 2026 Chinese Grand Prix
Previous race: 2025 Australian Grand Prix	Australian Grand Prix	Next race: 2027 Australian Grand Prix
