= Parade lap =

Lap preceding a motorsport race

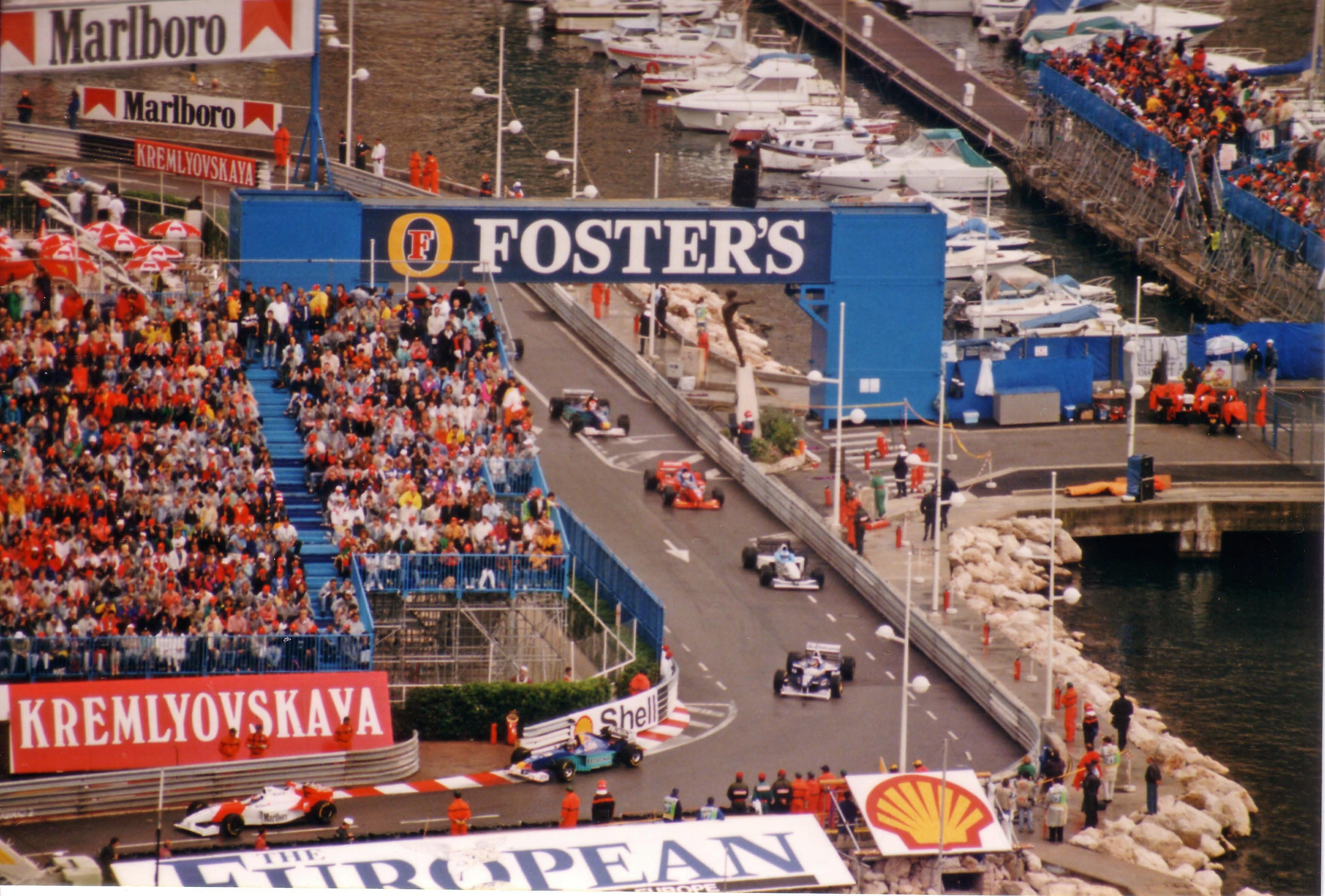
Formation lap of the 1996 Monaco Grand Prix

A parade lap, also known as a pace lap, formation lap or warm-up lap, is a lap before a motorsport race begins, in which the drivers go around the track at a slow speed (usually between 50 and 120 km/h (30 and 75 mph)), and, in some cases, behind the safety car.

== Purpose ==
The lap is to ensure that track conditions are safe, and that there are no dangerous problems with the cars (including the safety car) or the circuit. The parade lap either leads to a rolling start, standing start, or back to the grid. Short circuits (such as the Brands Hatch Indy circuit layout) often have two of these laps. Overtaking is usually permitted on these laps in motorcycle racing, but not in car racing.

The lap also allows the cars to warm up their tyres, which is crucial in order to be competitive during the race. Drivers will often attempt to warm up the tyres more quickly during the lap, by steering slowly from side to side, and may sometimes also warm their brakes.

== Usage ==
In Formula One, the official title is formation lap. Any car which fails to leave the grid before the last qualifier has moved away is required to start from either the pit lane or the back of the grid. In MotoGP and the Superbike World Championship, it is known as the warm-up lap.

In NASCAR, the parade lap is referenced as a pace lap, and safety car speed is the same as the pit lane speed limit.

== Incidents ==
- 1991 San Marino Grand Prix, Alain Prost and Gerhard Berger both went off the track in wet conditions; Berger re-joined and retook his grid position, but Prost stalled and was immediately out of the race.
- 1992 Indianapolis 500, pole sitter Roberto Guerrero crashed into the inside retaining wall while attempting to warm up his slick tires.
- 1996 French Grand Prix, the Ferrari of pole position qualifier Michael Schumacher stopped with an engine fault.
- 1998 Japanese Grand Touring Championship at Fuji Speedway, the Ferrari driven by Tetsuya Ota aquaplaned while braking during the parade lap and collided with another car, with both vehicles exploding into a fireball on impact.
- 1999 Indianapolis 500, a collision on the formation lap eliminated three cars.
- 2009 Valencian MotoGP, Ducati rider Casey Stoner crashed at the second turn of the Circuit Ricardo Tormo and missed the race.
- 2018 Detroit Grand Prix, General Motors' executive Mark Reuss crashed a Chevrolet Corvette ZR1 pace car during a pace lap, delaying the start of the race by 30 minutes.
- 2023 São Paulo Grand Prix, Charles Leclerc's Ferrari suffered a hydraulics issue which led to him crashing into a barrier.
- 2024 São Paulo Grand Prix, Lando Norris mistook the aborted start procedure for an extra formation lap and by doing so caused chaos because many drivers turned their engines off and had to restart them in order to do the extra lap.
- 2025 Australian Grand Prix, Isack Hadjar spun and crashed at the exit of turn 2 due to aquaplaning.
- 2025 Austrian Grand Prix, Carlos Sainz Jr.'s Williams had an issue and could not start the formation lap. He was eventually able to get the car moving but after completing the lap, while in the pitlane his brakes caught on fire and he did not start the race. Due to this the start of the race was delayed by 15 minutes.
