= 2025 Monaco Grand Prix =

Formula One motor race

Race 8 of 24 in the 2025 Formula One World Championship
← Previous race	Next race →
- Layout of the Circuit de Monte Carlo, Monaco

Race details
- Date: 25 May 2025
- Official name: Formula 1 TAG Heuer Grand Prix de Monaco 2025
- Location: Circuit de Monaco; La Condamine and Monte Carlo, Monaco
- Course: Street circuit
- Course length: 3.337 km (2.074 miles)
- Distance: 78 laps, 260.286 km (161.772 miles)
- Weather: Sunny
- Attendance: 250,000

Pole position
Driver	(United Kingdom) Lando Norris	McLaren-Mercedes
- Time: 1:09.954

Fastest lap
Driver	(United Kingdom) Lando Norris	McLaren-Mercedes
- Time: 1:13.221 on lap 78

Podium
First	(United Kingdom) Lando Norris	McLaren-Mercedes
Second	(Monaco) Charles Leclerc	Ferrari
Third	(Australia) Oscar Piastri	McLaren-Mercedes

The 2025 Monaco Grand Prix (officially known as the Formula 1 TAG Heuer Grand Prix de Monaco 2025) was a Formula One motor race held on 25 May 2025, at the Circuit de Monaco in Monaco. It was the eighth round of the 2025 Formula One World Championship. Lando Norris of McLaren took pole position for the race, which he went on to win, his second of the season, with Charles Leclerc of Ferrari second and Norris's teammate Oscar Piastri third. This was the first McLaren race victory at Monaco since 2008.

Following his first win since the season opener in Melbourne, Norris closed the gap over Piastri to three points, with Max Verstappen a further 22 points behind in third. The result also meant that McLaren amassed a total of 319 points in the Constructors' Championship, having scored more points than Mercedes and Red Bull combined across the opening eight rounds.

== Background ==
The event was held at the Circuit de Monaco in Monaco for the 82nd time in the circuit's history, across the weekend of 23–25 May. The Grand Prix was the eighth round of the 2025 Formula One World Championship and the 71st running of the Monaco Grand Prix as a round of the Formula One World Championship.

=== Championship standings before the race ===
Going into the weekend, Oscar Piastri led the Drivers' Championship with 146 points, 13 points ahead of his teammate Lando Norris in second, and 22 ahead of Max Verstappen in third. McLaren, with 279 points, led the Constructors' Championship from Mercedes and Red Bull Racing, who were second and third with 147 and 131 points, respectively.

=== Entrants ===
The drivers and teams were the same as published in the season entry list with two exceptions; Yuki Tsunoda at Red Bull Racing was in the seat originally held by Liam Lawson before the latter was demoted back to Racing Bulls from the Japanese Grand Prix onward, and Franco Colapinto replaced Jack Doohan at Alpine from the preceding Emilia Romagna Grand Prix onward until at least the Austrian Grand Prix on a rotating seat basis.

=== Tyre choices ===
Tyre supplier Pirelli brought the C4, C5, and C6 tyre compounds—the softest three in their range (designated hard, medium, and soft, respectively)—for teams to use at the event.

=== Mandatory pit stops ===
With the aim of promoting better racing, there was an increase in the number of mandatory pit stops for the event. The Grand Prix saw the implementation of a minimum two-stop strategy, in both wet and dry conditions. The teams were also mandated to use at least three sets of tyres in the race, with a minimum of two different tyre compounds if it was a dry race.

== Practice ==
Three free practice sessions were held for the event. The first free practice session was held on 23 May 2025, at 13:30 local time (UTC+2), and was topped by Charles Leclerc of Ferrari ahead of Max Verstappen of Red Bull Racing and Lando Norris of McLaren. A red flag was observed after Leclerc hit Aston Martin driver Lance Stroll at turn 6. The second free practice was held on the same day, at 17:00 local time, and was topped by Leclerc followed by Oscar Piastri of McLaren and Leclerc's teammate Lewis Hamilton. Two red flags occurred due to crashes of Isack Hadjar of Racing Bulls and Piastri.

The third free practice was held on 24 May 2025, at 12:30 local time, and was topped by Leclerc ahead of Verstappen and Norris. The session was red-flagged in the closing stages due to Hamilton crashing at turn 4, ripping off his Ferrari's front-right tyre.

== Qualifying ==
Qualifying was held on 24 May 2025, at 16:00 local time (UTC+2), and determined the starting grid order for the race.

=== Qualifying report ===
Two red flags were observed throughout qualifying. The first was at the end of the opening segment of qualifying (Q1) due to Kimi Antonelli of Mercedes crashing at the Nouvelle Chicane, damaging his front-left suspension. Gabriel Bortoleto, Oliver Bearman, Pierre Gasly, Lance Stroll, and Franco Colapinto were eliminated in Q1. The time Antonelli set was enough to make it to the second segment of qualifying (Q2), but he did not run any laps. The second red flag was observed in Q2 after Antonelli's teammate George Russell suffered a battery failure and stopped in the tunnel. Carlos Sainz Jr., Yuki Tsunoda, Nico Hulkenberg, Russell, and Antonelli were eliminated in Q2. McLaren’s Lando Norris set the fastest ever recorded lap at the Monaco Grand Prix with a time of 1:09.954 to take pole position.

=== Qualifying classification ===
Pos.	No.	Driver	Constructor	Qualifying times			Final grid
Pos.	No.	Driver	Constructor	Q1	Q2	Q3	Final grid
1	4	(United Kingdom) Lando Norris	McLaren-Mercedes	1:11.285	1:10.570	1:09.954	1
2	16	(Monaco) Charles Leclerc	Ferrari	1:11.229	1:10.581	1:10.063	2
3	81	(Australia) Oscar Piastri	McLaren-Mercedes	1:11.308	1:10.858	1:10.129	3
4	44	(United Kingdom) Lewis Hamilton	Ferrari	1:11.575	1:10.883	1:10.382	7^{1}
5	1	(Netherlands) Max Verstappen	Red Bull Racing-Honda RBPT	1:11.431	1:10.875	1:10.669	4
6	6	(France) Isack Hadjar	Racing Bulls-Honda RBPT	1:11.811	1:11.040	1:10.923	5
7	14	(Spain) Fernando Alonso	Aston Martin Aramco-Mercedes	1:11.674	1:11.182	1:10.924	6
8	31	(France) Esteban Ocon	Haas-Ferrari	1:11.839	1:11.262	1:10.942	8
9	30	(New Zealand) Liam Lawson	Racing Bulls-Honda RBPT	1:11.818	1:11.250	1:11.129	9
10	23	(Thailand) Alexander Albon	Williams-Mercedes	1:11.629	1:10.732	1:11.213	10
11	55	(Spain) Carlos Sainz Jr.	Williams-Mercedes	1:11.707	1:11.362	N/A	11
12	22	(Japan) Yuki Tsunoda	Red Bull Racing-Honda RBPT	1:11.800	1:11.415	N/A	12
13	27	(Germany) Nico Hülkenberg	Kick Sauber-Ferrari	1:11.871	1:11.596	N/A	13
14	63	(United Kingdom) George Russell	Mercedes	1:11.507	No time	N/A	14
15	12	(Italy) Kimi Antonelli	Mercedes	1:11.880	No time	N/A	15
16	5	(Brazil) Gabriel Bortoleto	Kick Sauber-Ferrari	1:11.902	N/A	N/A	16
17	87	(United Kingdom) Oliver Bearman	Haas-Ferrari	1:11.979	N/A	N/A	20^{2}
18	10	(France) Pierre Gasly	Alpine-Renault	1:11.994	N/A	N/A	17
19	18	(Canada) Lance Stroll	Aston Martin Aramco-Mercedes	1:12.563	N/A	N/A	19^{3}
20	43	(Argentina) Franco Colapinto	Alpine-Renault	1:12.597	N/A	N/A	18
107% time: 1:16.215

Notes

- ^1 – Lewis Hamilton received a three-place grid penalty for impeding Max Verstappen in Q1.
- ^2 – Oliver Bearman received a ten-place grid penalty for overtaking Carlos Sainz Jr. under red flag conditions during the second free practice session.
- ^3 – Lance Stroll received a one-place grid penalty for causing a collision with Charles Leclerc during the first free practice session. He also received a three-place grid penalty for impeding Pierre Gasly in Q1. Both penalties made no difference due to Oliver Bearman's penalty.

== Race ==
The race was held on 25 May 2025, at 15:00 local time (UTC+2), and ran for 78 laps.

=== Race report ===
Lando Norris of McLaren got a slightly poorer start than his front row rival Charles Leclerc of Ferrari, who momentarily challenged him for the lead into the opening Sainte Devote turn. However, Norris was able to hold the inside line and maintain his lead. Fighting for fifteenth place, Gabriel Bortoleto of Sauber overtook Kimi Antonelli of Mercedes around the outside of the Fairmont Hairpin, which Antonelli attempted to respond to by diving up the inside at the Portier turn. Bortoleto, already committed to the corner, was unable to avoid hitting the barrier and, whilst able to reverse back onto the track, lost his front wing and dropped to last in the race. The virtual safety car (VSC) was deployed to allow marshals to clear the debris from this incident. Before the race, there had been speculation as to whether the cars at the back of the grid might take one of their two mandatory pit stops on the first lap in order to give themselves clean air. Yuki Tsunoda of Red Bull Racing, Pierre Gasly of Alpine, Oliver Bearman of Haas and Bortoleto did just that, with the time lost compared to other cars being lessened due to the VSC being deployed at the time.

On lap 9 Gasly, who was running in 18th position, misjudged his braking for the Nouvelle Chicane and drove into the rear of Tsunoda. Gasly's front-left wheel was dislodged by the impact, ending his race, however he was able to drive back to the pit lane and therefore the debris could be cleared under double-waved yellow flags. As they passed through the yellow flag area, fourth-placed Max Verstappen of Red Bull closed up the rear of McLaren's Oscar Piastri but was unable to pass, complaining over team radio that Piastri "would have taken my front wing off". At the end of lap 14 Isack Hadjar of Racing Bulls, who had been running in sixth position, became the first driver to pit from the top ten but was able to return to the track in eighth thanks to the efforts of his teammate Liam Lawson; Lawson had deliberately slowed down the cars behind in order to give Hadjar the gap necessary to pit and remain in front. The cars behind Lawson had been unable to overtake him, due to the narrow and twisting nature of the Circuit de Monaco. These inter-team tactics would end up being used extensively throughout the Grand Prix. On lap 18 Lewis Hamilton of Ferrari made his first stop and was able to overcut both Hadjar and Fernando Alonso of Aston Martin, moving him from a net seventh to fifth position.

On lap 19, race leader Norris made his first pit stop without incident, switching from mediums to hards. Hadjar made his second pit stop just five laps after his first, and was able to again rejoin ahead of Lawson and the group of cars that were being slowed down behind him. This meant that Hadjar had completed both his mandatory pit stops whilst remaining ahead of cars whom had not yet made either of theirs. On lap 28 race leader Verstappen, who had been running long with the hope of making an overcut on Piastri, made his first pit stop and rejoined in fourth, the same position he had been in before the pit stop phase of the race. On lap 37 Alonso, running in sixth with one stop left to make, suffered an engine failure which ended his hopes for a first points finish of the season. Alonso was able to pull off through a gap in the barriers, thus no safety car intervention was necessary. 10th-placed Carlos Sainz Jr. was using the same tactics seen earlier from Lawson to help his Williams teammate Alexander Albon. This frustrated the chasing George Russell of Mercedes to the point where on lap 50 Russell passed Albon by cutting the Nouvelle Chicane, ostensibly due to Albon's "erratic driving". Russell refused to return the position, stating over radio that he would rather take a penalty then remain stuck behind the Williams. In response to this radio, the stewards imposed a harsher than usual drive-through penalty for the illegal overtake. (Note: A ten-second time penalty is the standard for "leaving the track and gaining an advantage". Russell was awarded the harsher drive through penalty as it was deemed that he deliberately missed the corner.)

At the same time, Norris made his second and final pit stop; this left him behind Verstappen, who still had one stop left to make. Verstappen decided to delay his pit stop as much as possible in the hope that a safety car or red flag might be deployed, which would possibly allow him to make his stop and remain in the lead. Norris, on fresh tyres, quickly caught Verstappen but was unable to pass, leading to him being caught by Leclerc and Piastri. Despite the gap to Leclerc reaching as little as half a second, Norris held his lead over the Ferrari, and when Verstappen finally pitted on lap 77, Norris retook the race lead. Norris then set the fastest lap on the final lap, winning his first Monaco Grand Prix and sixth Grand Prix overall by three seconds. Leclerc and Piastri completed the podium whilst both Racing Bulls drivers took their then-best results in a Grand Prix, with Hadjar in sixth and Lawson in eighth respectively – the latter scoring his first points of the season.

=== Post-race ===
Due to the Circuit de Monaco twisty layout, lack of straights and narrow nature, there was only one overtake, and zero inside the top 10, (Note: Compared to the previous years, which had four overtakes, all outside the top ten. The 2023 event had 22, and the 2022 event had 13; these two races were affected by rain.) with Mercedes calculating a car needed a 4.5-second pace advantage over the car in front to have even a 50–50 chance at an overtake. One of the two on-track "passes" occurred courtesy of Mercedes's George Russell's intentionally cutting the Nouvelle Chicane for which he received a drive-through penalty. Several teams, including Williams, Racing Bulls, and Mercedes, gamed the new rule mandating a second pit stop by ordering one driver to hold up the rest of the field so that the other driver ahead of them could race in free air and pit without losing track position. Max Verstappen of Red Bull Racing also attempted to take advantage of the two-stop rule by staying out on old tyres and gambling for a pit stop under safety car or red flag conditions, where he would have lost less time relative to his rivals. He took the lead after polesitter Lando Norris of McLaren took his second pit stop, but no free pit stop materialised and Verstappen was forced to pit at the end of the race, dropping him to fourth.

Several drivers criticised the Grand Prix following the race. Williams's Carlos Sainz Jr. and Alexander Albon admitted that while they understood they needed to (legally) block other drivers for tactical reasons, they did not like it. Sainz warned that should there be no further rule changes, the tactic of blocking other drivers would increase in Monaco in future years. Race winner Lando Norris added that the FIA's two-pit-stop rule had made the race more luck-based but not more competitive. On a more humorous note, Verstappen suggested that the organisers would need Mario Kart-style gimmicks to make Monaco more interesting, and Russell revived Bernie Ecclestone's idea of using sprinklers to add artificial hazards to the circuit.

Various team principals also commented on the lack of action on race day. Red Bull's Christian Horner said that the two-pit-stop rule made the race more dramatic but was not a material change. He asked the organisers to modify the circuit to permit organic overtakes. McLaren's Andrea Stella agreed that the two-stop rule did not work but was unsure whether or how the track could be meaningfully modified. Mercedes's Toto Wolff suggested a minimum lap time so that teams could not drive intentionally slowly.

=== Race classification ===
Pos.	No.	Driver	Constructor	Laps	Time/Retired	Grid	Points
1	4	(United Kingdom) Lando Norris	McLaren-Mercedes	78	1:40:33.843	1	25
2	16	(Monaco) Charles Leclerc	Ferrari	78	+3.131	2	18
3	81	(Australia) Oscar Piastri	McLaren-Mercedes	78	+3.658	3	15
4	1	(Netherlands) Max Verstappen	Red Bull Racing-Honda RBPT	78	+20.572	4	12
5	44	(United Kingdom) Lewis Hamilton	Ferrari	78	+51.387	7	10
6	6	(France) Isack Hadjar	Racing Bulls-Honda RBPT	77	+1 lap	5	8
7	31	(France) Esteban Ocon	Haas-Ferrari	77	+1 lap	8	6
8	30	(New Zealand) Liam Lawson	Racing Bulls-Honda RBPT	77	+1 lap	9	4
9	23	(Thailand) Alexander Albon	Williams-Mercedes	76	+2 laps	10	2
10	55	(Spain) Carlos Sainz Jr.	Williams-Mercedes	76	+2 laps	11	1
11	63	(United Kingdom) George Russell	Mercedes	76	+2 laps	14	
12	87	(United Kingdom) Oliver Bearman	Haas-Ferrari	76	+2 laps	20	
13	43	(Argentina) Franco Colapinto	Alpine-Renault	76	+2 laps	18	
14	5	(Brazil) Gabriel Bortoleto	Kick Sauber-Ferrari	76	+2 laps	16	
15	18	(Canada) Lance Stroll	Aston Martin Aramco-Mercedes	76	+2 laps	19	
16	27	(Germany) Nico Hülkenberg	Kick Sauber-Ferrari	76	+2 laps	13	
17	22	(Japan) Yuki Tsunoda	Red Bull Racing-Honda RBPT	76	+2 laps	12	
18	12	(Italy) Kimi Antonelli	Mercedes	75	+3 laps	15	
Ret	14	(Spain) Fernando Alonso	Aston Martin Aramco-Mercedes	36	Engine	6	
Ret	10	(France) Pierre Gasly	Alpine-Renault	7	Collision	17	

== Championship standings after the race ==
Drivers' Championship standings

Pos.	Driver	Points
1	(Australia) Oscar Piastri	161
2	(United Kingdom) Lando Norris	158
3	(Netherlands) Max Verstappen	136
4	(United Kingdom) George Russell	99
5	(Monaco) Charles Leclerc	79

Constructors' Championship standings

Pos.	Constructor	Points
1	(United Kingdom) McLaren-Mercedes	319
2	(Germany) Mercedes	147
3	(Austria) Red Bull Racing-Honda RBPT	143
4	(Italy) Ferrari	142
5	(United Kingdom) Williams-Mercedes	54

- Note: Only the top five positions are included for both sets of standings.

== See also ==
- 2025 Monte Carlo Formula 2 round
- 2025 Monte Carlo Formula 3 round

== Notes ==
Previous race: 2025 Emilia Romagna Grand Prix	FIA Formula One World Championship; 2025 season	Next race: 2025 Spanish Grand Prix
Previous race: 2024 Monaco Grand Prix	Monaco Grand Prix	Next race: 2026 Monaco Grand Prix
