= 2025 Australian Grand Prix =

First round of the 2025 F1 season

Race 1 of 24 in the 2025 Formula One World Championship
Next race →
- Layout of the Melbourne Grand Prix Circuit

Race details
- Date: 16 March 2025
- Official name: Formula 1 Louis Vuitton Australian Grand Prix 2025
- Location: Albert Park Circuit, Melbourne, Victoria, Australia
- Course: Temporary street circuit
- Course length: 5.278 km (3.280 miles)
- Distance: 57 laps, 300.846 km (186.937 miles)
- Scheduled distance: 58 laps, 306.124 km (190.217 miles)
- Weather: Light rain. Max. ambient temp. 16.7°C, max. track temp. 19.4°C
- Attendance: 465,498

Pole position
Driver	(United Kingdom) Lando Norris	McLaren-Mercedes
- Time: 1:15.096

Fastest lap
Driver	(United Kingdom) Lando Norris	McLaren-Mercedes
- Time: 1:22.167 on lap 43

Podium
First	(United Kingdom) Lando Norris	McLaren-Mercedes
Second	(Netherlands) Max Verstappen	Red Bull Racing-Honda RBPT
Third	(United Kingdom) George Russell	Mercedes

The 2025 Australian Grand Prix (officially known as the Formula 1 Louis Vuitton Australian Grand Prix 2025) was a Formula One motor race that was held on 16 March 2025 at the Albert Park Circuit in Melbourne, Victoria, Australia. It was the first round of the 2025 Formula One World Championship.

Lando Norris in the McLaren won the race from pole position, ahead of Max Verstappen in the Red Bull and George Russell in the Mercedes. Norris' victory marked McLaren's first at Melbourne since Jenson Button's victory in 2012. The race also featured the debut of Isack Hadjar, Gabriel Bortoleto, and future Formula One world champion Kimi Antonelli, who drove for Racing Bulls, Sauber, and Mercedes respectively. Hadjar and Bortoleto both retired due to accidents, the former on the formation lap, while Antonelli finished fourth from a sixteenth-place start.

Norris' victory made him the championship leader for the first time in his career, ending Verstappen's streak of leading the World Drivers' Championship continuously since the 2022 Spanish Grand Prix. McLaren took the Constructors' Championship lead with 27 points, with Mercedes in second, (Note: McLaren were ranked ahead of Mercedes on the count back system. McLaren's best race result was 1st, with Mercedes best race result being 3rd.) also on 27 and Red Bull trailing both of them by nine points in third.

== Background ==
The event was held at Albert Park Circuit in Melbourne for the 28th time in the circuit's history, across the weekend of 14–16 March. The Grand Prix was the first round of the 2025 Formula One World Championship and the 39th running of the Australian Grand Prix as a round of the Formula One World Championship. This was also the first Australian Grand Prix to be held as the season opener since 2019.

=== Entrants ===
The drivers and teams were the same as published in the season entry list, with no additional stand-in drivers for the race.

Oliver Bearman, Kimi Antonelli, Jack Doohan, Gabriel Bortoleto, Liam Lawson, and Isack Hadjar made their debuts as full-time drivers with Haas, Mercedes, Alpine, Sauber, Red Bull Racing, and Racing Bulls, respectively.

The Grand Prix also marked Lewis Hamilton's first as a Ferrari driver, after spending twelve seasons with Mercedes, as well as his first season without a Mercedes power unit. Esteban Ocon, Nico Hülkenberg, and Carlos Sainz Jr. joined Haas, Sauber, and Williams, respectively.

=== Tyre choices ===
Tyre supplier Pirelli brought the C3, C4, and C5 tyre compounds, designated hard, medium, and soft, respectively, for teams to use at the event.

== Practice ==
Three free practice sessions were held for the event. The first free practice session was held on 14 March 2025, at 12:30 local time (UTC+11). Ferrari's Charles Leclerc was first early on in the session, a couple of tenths clear of Mercedes driver George Russell, those times having been posted on medium compound tyres. Jack Doohan of Alpine caused an early red flag after running wide through turn 6, bring gravel onto the track which needed to be cleared. With times starting to come in from soft compound tyre runs, Oliver Bearman of Haas lost control of his car exiting the turn 9–10 chicane and hit the left hand side wall, bringing out a second red flag. By the end of the opening practice session, Lando Norris, Carlos Sainz Jr., Charles Leclerc, Oscar Piastri, and Max Verstappen made up the top five.

The second free practice session was held on the same day, at 16:00 local time. Oliver Bearman did not participate in the session as the Haas team was continuing to repair the car following his heavy crash in the first practice session. Nico Hülkenberg of Sauber ran into a gravel trap in turn 6, resulting in the car being called back into the pit lanes for a floor check. By the end of the session, Charles Leclerc held onto first, with Oscar Piastri, Lando Norris, Yuki Tsunoda and Lewis Hamilton making up second to fifth.

The third free practice session was held on 15 March 2025, at 12:30 local time. Oliver Bearman spun the car at turn 11, getting stuck in the gravel and necessitating another red flag. Red Bull Racing's Liam Lawson also was forced to retire due to a power unit system problem. The session ended with Piastri fastest, ahead of Russell, Verstappen, Leclerc and Kimi Antonelli.

== Qualifying ==
Qualifying was held on 15 March 2025, at 16:00 local time (UTC+11), and determined the starting grid order for the race.

=== Qualifying report ===
The first session (Q1) ran for 18 minutes, eliminating cars that finished 16th or lower. The first flying laps began, most of the grid starting on soft tyres. Lando Norris of McLaren went fastest with his effort of 1:16.003, just over one-hundredth of a second clear of Max Verstappen. As Fernando Alonso slotted his Aston Martin into fifth, Liam Lawson triggered a yellow flag after oversteering his RB21 into the gravel. He later ran into the grass as well, resulting in him qualifying 18th. Kimi Antonelli also had his fair share of issues in the gravel, dragging the Mercedes rookie down into a danger zone of fourteenth, and would eventually be pushed down to sixteenth. By the end of Q1, Antonelli, Nico Hülkenberg, Liam Lawson, Esteban Ocon, and Oliver Bearman were knocked out, making up grid places 16–20.

The second session (Q2) lasted 15 minutes, eliminating cars that finished 11th to 15th. Max Verstappen headed out for Q2 first, setting the initial pace before Oscar Piastri and Lando Norris took the fastest times. Aston Martin's Fernando Alonso had a run in with the kerb, returning to the pits without completing a lap. Gabriel Bortoleto of Sauber made an impressive save, avoiding what could have been a detrimental crash, however Lewis Hamilton brought out the yellow flags, the seven-time World Champion spinning out. This yellow flag was detrimental to the drivers in the bottom of the field, Bortoleto included. Norris held onto the quickest lap at 1:15.415. After Q2, Isack Hadjar, Fernando Alonso, Lance Stroll, Jack Doohan, and Gabriel Bortoleto were knocked out, and landed places 11–15 on the grid respectively.

The final 12 minute session (Q3) determined pole position to tenth. Charles Leclerc initially looked to have secured provisional pole before Max Verstappen – just eight-hundredths clear on a 1:15.671 – as well as George Russell bettered his effort. Lando Norris, meanwhile, had his time deleted due to exceeding track limits. As a queue formed in the pits, Oscar Piastri found himself in the lead, and beat current World champion Verstappen by four-tenths of a second before Norris set a time 0.084 seconds faster to take pole position.

=== Qualifying classification ===
Pos.	No.	Driver	Constructor	Qualifying times			Final grid
Pos.	No.	Driver	Constructor	Q1	Q2	Q3	Final grid
1	4	(United Kingdom) Lando Norris	McLaren-Mercedes	1:15.912	1:15.415	1:15.096	1
2	81	(Australia) Oscar Piastri	McLaren-Mercedes	1:16.062	1:15.468	1:15.180	2
3	1	(Netherlands) Max Verstappen	Red Bull Racing-Honda RBPT	1:16.018	1:15.565	1:15.481	3
4	63	(United Kingdom) George Russell	Mercedes	1:15.971	1:15.789	1:15.546	4
5	22	(Japan) Yuki Tsunoda	Racing Bulls-Honda RBPT	1:16.225	1:16.009	1:15.670	5
6	23	(Thailand) Alexander Albon	Williams-Mercedes	1:16.245	1:16.017	1:15.737	6
7	16	(Monaco) Charles Leclerc	Ferrari	1:16.029	1:15.827	1:15.755	7
8	44	(United Kingdom) Lewis Hamilton	Ferrari	1:16.213	1:15.919	1:15.973	8
9	10	(France) Pierre Gasly	Alpine-Renault	1:16.328	1:16.112	1:15.980	9
10	55	(Spain) Carlos Sainz Jr.	Williams-Mercedes	1:16.360	1:15.931	1:16.062	10
11	6	(France) Isack Hadjar	Racing Bulls-Honda RBPT	1:16.354	1:16.175	N/A	11
12	14	(Spain) Fernando Alonso	Aston Martin Aramco-Mercedes	1:16.288	1:16.453	N/A	12
13	18	(Canada) Lance Stroll	Aston Martin Aramco-Mercedes	1:16.369	1:16.483	N/A	13
14	7	(Australia) Jack Doohan	Alpine-Renault	1:16.315	1:16.863	N/A	14
15	5	(Brazil) Gabriel Bortoleto	Kick Sauber-Ferrari	1:16.516	1:17.520	N/A	15
16	12	(Italy) Kimi Antonelli	Mercedes	1:16.525	N/A	N/A	16
17	27	(Germany) Nico Hülkenberg	Kick Sauber-Ferrari	1:16.579	N/A	N/A	17
18	30	(New Zealand) Liam Lawson	Red Bull Racing-Honda RBPT	1:17.094	N/A	N/A	PL^{1}
19	31	(France) Esteban Ocon	Haas-Ferrari	1:17.174	N/A	N/A	19
107% time: 1:21.225
—	87	(United Kingdom) Oliver Bearman	Haas-Ferrari	No time	N/A	N/A	PL^{2}

Notes

- ^1 – Liam Lawson qualified 18th, but was required to start the race from the pit lane as his car was modified under parc fermé conditions.
- ^2 – Oliver Bearman failed to set a time during qualifying. He was permitted to race at the stewards' discretion, but was required to start from the pit lane as his car was modified under parc fermé conditions.

== Race ==
The race was held on 16 March 2025, and was scheduled to start at 15:00 local time (UTC+11), but was delayed to 15:15 due to Isack Hadjar's crash on the formation lap. The race was set to be run for 58 laps, but was shortened by one lap due to the aborted start procedure.

=== Race report ===
The race was held under changing, intermediate conditions. Isack Hadjar crashed his Racing Bulls during the formation lap, resulting in an abandoned start and 10-minute delay. Lando Norris in the McLaren led a majority of the race. He briefly lost the lead to Max Verstappen when Norris and teammate Oscar Piastri lost control in intermediate conditions, with Norris boxing shortly afterward. Having lost control, Piastri was beached for a short time before he freed himself, dropping to thirteenth and later recovering to ninth after a late pass on Ferrari's Lewis Hamilton.

Verstappen, in the Red Bull, was trailing Norris as the race reached its closing stages. Norris kept Verstappen behind to win the Grand Prix, bringing McLaren its first win in Australia since Jenson Button did so for the team in 2012. In doing so, Norris led the Drivers' Championship for the first time in his career, and broke Verstappen's reign in the lead of the championship, which he had held since the 2022 Spanish Grand Prix. Having been briefly penalised, dropping him to fifth before his team lodged an appeal, which was upheld, Kimi Antonelli in the Mercedes recovered twelve places from his sixteenth-place start to finish in fourth, and his points finish made him the second-youngest Formula One driver to have scored a point.

Six retirements were observed, all for accidents on track, for which three safety car periods were observed: Hadjar, during the formation lap, Jack Doohan for Alpine, Carlos Sainz Jr. for Williams, Fernando Alonso for Aston Martin, Gabriel Bortoleto for Sauber, and Verstappen's teammate Liam Lawson. Sainz's teammate, Alexander Albon, scored a highest finish of fifth for Williams, the first time the team has done such since the 2021 Belgian Grand Prix. Alonso's teammate Lance Stroll finished in sixth, and Sauber's Nico Hülkenberg seventh, placing them above Ferrari, who had a disappointing season opener with Charles Leclerc finishing in eighth and Hamilton tenth. The Haas duo of Oliver Bearman and Esteban Ocon rounded off the bottom two on-track finishers.

=== Race classification ===
Pos.	No.	Driver	Constructor	Laps	Time/Retired	Grid	Points
1	4	(United Kingdom) Lando Norris	McLaren-Mercedes	57	1:42:06.304	1	25
2	1	(Netherlands) Max Verstappen	Red Bull Racing-Honda RBPT	57	+0.895	3	18
3	63	(United Kingdom) George Russell	Mercedes	57	+8.481	4	15
4	12	(Italy) Kimi Antonelli	Mercedes	57	+10.135	16	12
5	23	(Thailand) Alexander Albon	Williams-Mercedes	57	+12.773	6	10
6	18	(Canada) Lance Stroll	Aston Martin Aramco-Mercedes	57	+17.413	13	8
7	27	(Germany) Nico Hülkenberg	Kick Sauber-Ferrari	57	+18.423	17	6
8	16	(Monaco) Charles Leclerc	Ferrari	57	+19.826	7	4
9	81	(Australia) Oscar Piastri	McLaren-Mercedes	57	+20.448	2	2
10	44	(United Kingdom) Lewis Hamilton	Ferrari	57	+22.473	8	1
11	10	(France) Pierre Gasly	Alpine-Renault	57	+26.502	9	
12	22	(Japan) Yuki Tsunoda	Racing Bulls-Honda RBPT	57	+29.884	5	
13	31	(France) Esteban Ocon	Haas-Ferrari	57	+33.161	19	
14	87	(United Kingdom) Oliver Bearman	Haas-Ferrari	57	+40.351	PL	
Ret	30	(New Zealand) Liam Lawson	Red Bull Racing-Honda RBPT	46	Accident	PL	
Ret	5	(Brazil) Gabriel Bortoleto	Kick Sauber-Ferrari	45	Accident	15	
Ret	14	(Spain) Fernando Alonso	Aston Martin Aramco-Mercedes	32	Accident	12	
Ret	55	(Spain) Carlos Sainz Jr.	Williams-Mercedes	0	Accident	10	
Ret	7	(Australia) Jack Doohan	Alpine-Renault	0	Accident	14	
DNS^{1}	6	(France) Isack Hadjar	Racing Bulls-Honda RBPT	0	Accident	—^{1}	

Notes

- ^1 – Isack Hadjar did not start the race as he crashed during the formation lap. His place on the grid was left vacant. His result was officially listed as "DNF" instead of "DNS" in the final classification published by the FIA.

== Championship standings after the race ==
Drivers' Championship standings

Pos.	Driver	Points
1	(United Kingdom) Lando Norris	25
2	(Netherlands) Max Verstappen	18
3	(United Kingdom) George Russell	15
4	(Italy) Kimi Antonelli	12
5	(Thailand) Alexander Albon	10

Constructors' Championship standings

Pos.	Constructor	Points
1	(United Kingdom) McLaren-Mercedes	27
2	(Germany) Mercedes	27
3	(Austria) Red Bull Racing-Honda RBPT	18
4	(United Kingdom) Williams-Mercedes	10
5	(United Kingdom) Aston Martin Aramco-Mercedes	8

- Note: Only the top five positions are included for both sets of standings.

== See also ==
- 2025 Melbourne Formula 2 round
- 2025 Melbourne Formula 3 round

== Notes ==
Previous race: 2024 Abu Dhabi Grand Prix	FIA Formula One World Championship; 2025 season	Next race: 2025 Chinese Grand Prix
Previous race: 2024 Australian Grand Prix	Australian Grand Prix	Next race: 2026 Australian Grand Prix
