= Isack Hadjar =

French and Algerian racing driver (born 2004)

- إسحاق حجار
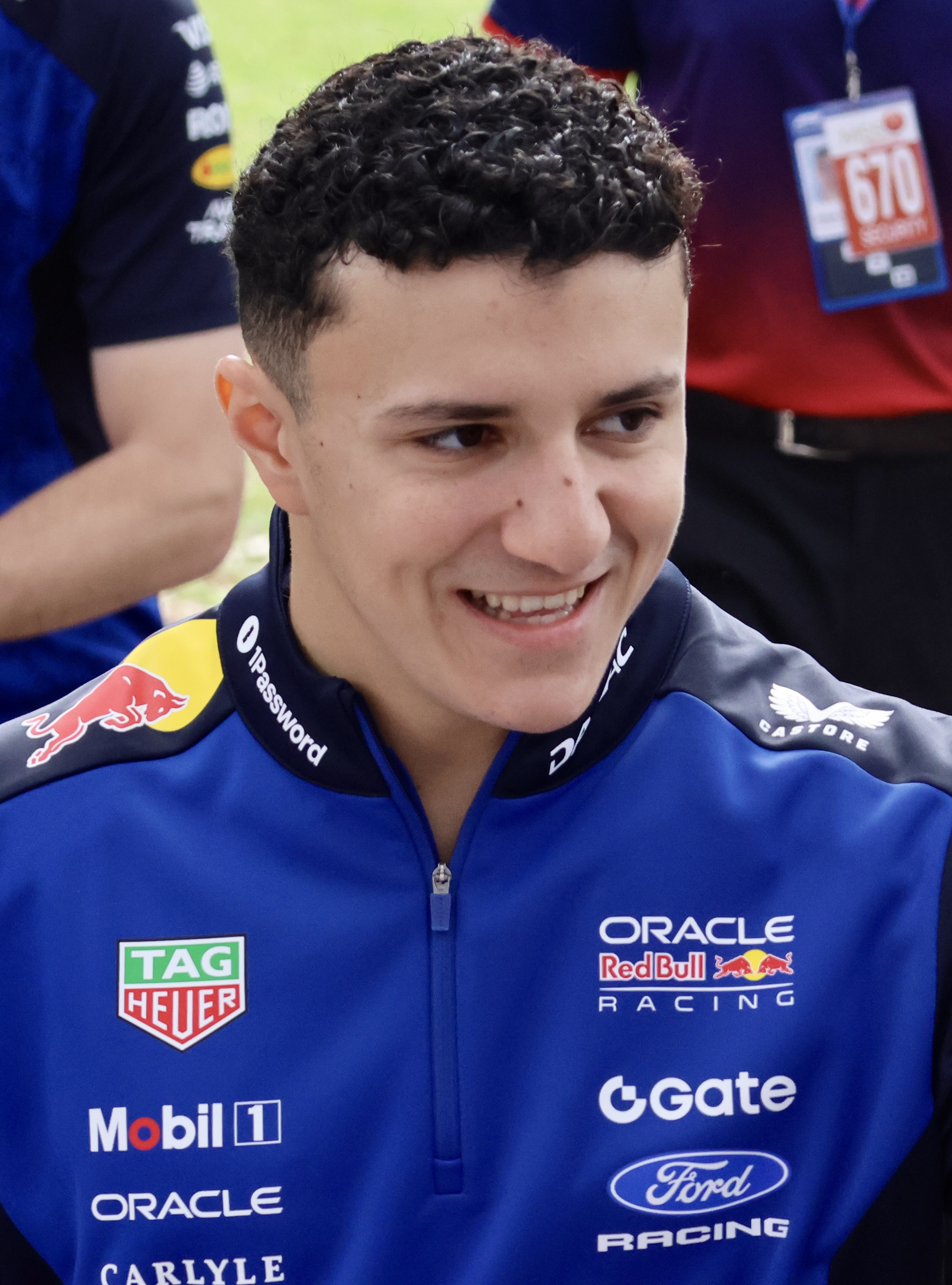
- Hadjar at the 2026 Australian Grand Prix
- Born: Isack Alexandre Hadjar; 28 September 2004 (age 22); Paris, France

Formula One World Championship career
- Nationality: (France) French
- 2026 team: Red Bull Racing-Red Bull Ford
- Car number: 6
- Entries: 41 (40 starts)
- Championships: 0
- Wins: 0
- Podiums: 4
- Career points: 173
- Pole positions: 0
- Fastest laps: 0
- First entry: 2025 Australian Grand Prix
- Last entry: 2026 São Paulo Grand Prix
- 2025 position: 12th (51 pts)

Previous series
- 2023–2024; 2022; 2021–2022; 2021; 2020; 2019–2020; 2018: FIA Formula 2; FIA Formula 3; FR Asian; FR European; F4 UAE; French F4; Ginetta Junior Winter
- Website: isackhadjar.com

Isack Alexandre Hadjar (Note: French: [i.zak alɛksɑ̃dʁ(ə) a.d͡ʒaʁ]; Arabic: إسحاق الإسكندر حجار, romanized: Isḥāq Ḥajar) (born 28 September 2004) is a French and Algerian racing driver who competes under the French flag in Formula One for Red Bull Racing.

Born and raised in Paris to an Algerian family, Hadjar began competitive kart racing aged seven. After debuting in sportscar racing at the Ginetta Junior Winter Series, Hadjar graduated to junior formulae in 2019. He finished third in the 2020 French F4 Championship with the FFSA Academy, before progressing to the Formula Regional European Championship in 2021, achieving multiple victories as he finished fifth in his rookie season. He then entered Formula Regional Asian and FIA Formula 3 in 2022 with Hitech, placing third in the former and achieving multiple wins in both. Hadjar graduated to FIA Formula 2 in 2023, finishing runner-up to Gabriel Bortoleto the following season with Campos; his successes in Formula 2 saw him nicknamed "le Petit Prost" in French media. (Note: lit. 'the Little Prost' Per several sources:)

A member of the Red Bull Junior Team since 2022, Hadjar signed for Racing Bulls in 2025, making his Formula One debut at the Australian Grand Prix, where he crashed on the formation lap. He scored several points finishes across his rookie season, including his maiden podium at the Dutch Grand Prix. Hadjar was promoted to the senior Red Bull team in 2026 alongside Max Verstappen. Hadjar is contracted to remain at Red Bull Racing until at least the end of the 2027 season.

== Early and personal life ==
Isack Alexandre Hadjar was born on 28 September 2004 in Paris, France, to an Algerian family of physicians and physicists. His father, Yassine Hadjar, is a researcher in quantum mechanics and also served as his kart mechanic. He holds dual Algerian and French citizenship. Isack is named after famous physicist Isaac Newton.

Hadjar initially grew fond of motorsport after watching the Pixar animated movie Cars. His parents bought him a go-kart when he was seven, a year after he started watching Formula One. He also competed in boxing and judo at a young age.

== Junior racing career ==
=== Karting (2012–2018) ===
Hadjar started competitive kart racing in 2012. After initially competing in national championships, Hadjar progressed to the international scene in 2017. Hadjar competed in the 2018 Karting World Championship and finished 22nd.

=== Formula 4 (2019–2020) ===
==== 2019 ====
In 2019, Hadjar made his single seater debut in the French F4 Championship. Despite struggling to push down fully on the car's pedals owing to his low height at the start of the season, Hadjar was able to achieve his first single-seater win at Spa during the third round. Hadjar earned another podium at the Circuit de Lédenon, with a second place in the final race. The final three rounds of the season, were hampered by three retirements, but he still managed to score a decent haul of points to finish seventh in the standings, claiming second in the junior class to Victor Bernier.

==== 2020 ====
Hadjar raced in two weekends of the F4 UAE Championship during the winter of 2020 with 3Y Technology. He had a highest finish of fourth place during the final round. Overall, he scored 56 points and placed eleventh in the championship.

Hadjar then once again drove in the French F4 Championship. Scoring a podium on debut, Hadjar scored regular rostrums in the first half of the season but did not win. However, in the penultimate round in Paul Ricard, Hadjar scored a pole position and held off Ayumu Iwasa to win his first race of the year. Hadjar would also win the third race of the round after another battle with Iwasa. At the third Paul Ricard round, he took the victor honours for a third time during the first race; he finished fifth and sixth in the final two races. With eight further podiums, two pole positions and three wins, Hadjar finished third in the drivers' standings with 233 points, being the highest placed French driver.

=== Formula Regional (2021–2022) ===
==== 2021 ====
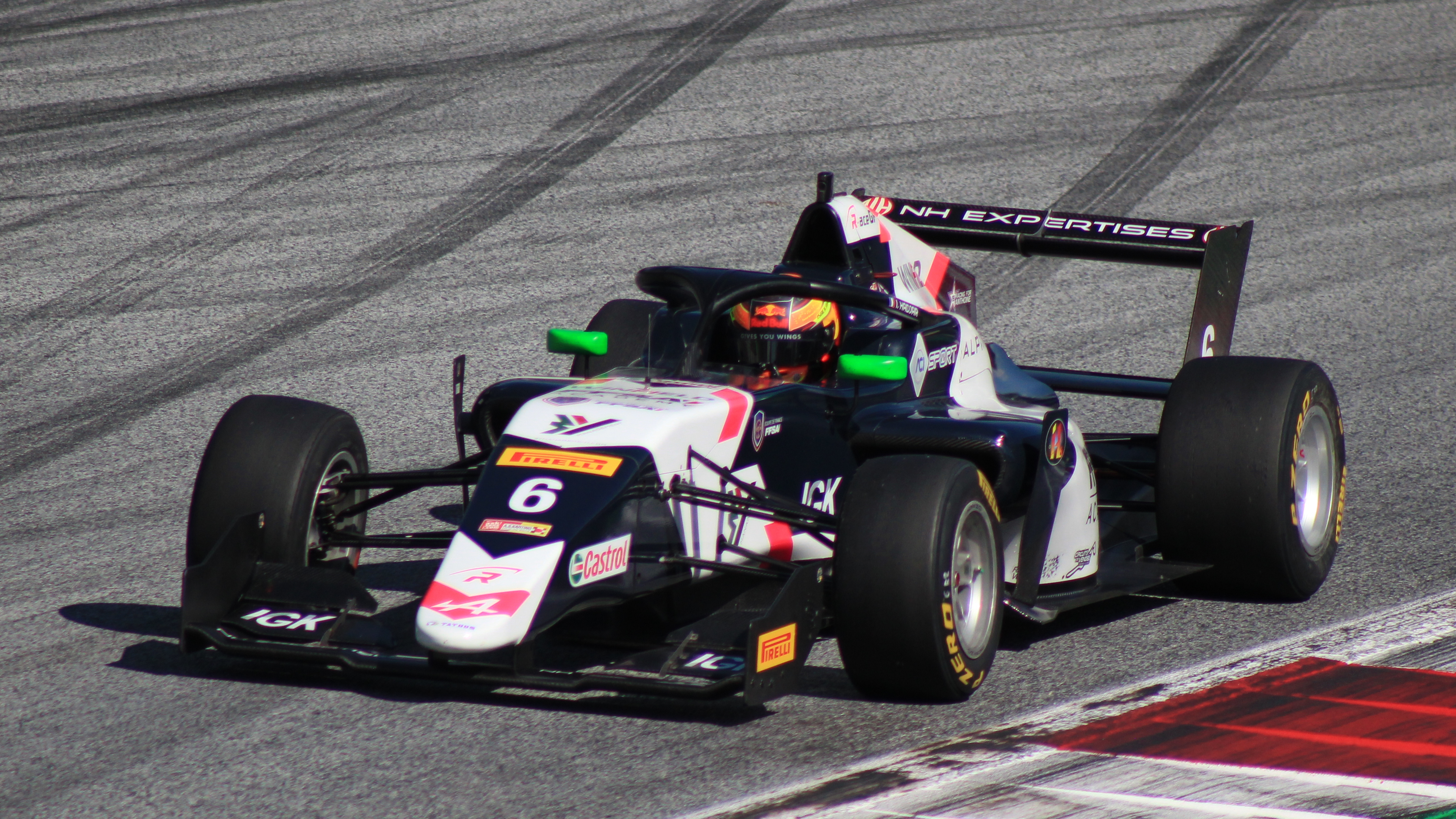
Hadjar racing in the 2021 Formula Regional European Championship

Hadjar made his debut at the Formula Regional level in 2021, competing in the first three rounds of the F3 Asian Championship with Evans GP. He impressed right from the start, scoring a podium finish during the opening round in Dubai Autodrome. During the second round at Yas Marina, Hadjar demonstrated strong pace and finished on the podium in all three rounds. Hadjar scored another third place during the final race of the third round. Despite not taking part in the latter rounds of the campaign, Hadjar managed to finish sixth in the standings, highest of all part-time entrants.

Hadjar's main campaign would lie in the Formula Regional European Championship, where he partnered Zane Maloney, Léna Bühler and fellow countryman Hadrien David at R-ace GP. Hadjar scored his first points, along with his first rookie win, at the first round in Imola. He then proceeded to score his first podium at the next event in Barcelona, and achieved his first Formula Regional victory in the first race on the streets of Monaco, from pole position. In that same weekend, Hadjar finished second in race two, only behind teammate Maloney, and closed in on the championship lead held by Grégoire Saucy. However, Hadjar would be unable to score a podium finish until the final round of the season, despite amassing a number of finishes in the top-six. Following a disappointing round at Mugello where he hadn't scored any points, Hadjar bounced back with a double podium in that final round at Monza, scoring a win in the second race after the leading pair collided. Hadjar ended up fifth in the standings, just four points behind teammate Maloney, and won the honours for the best rookie of the season.

==== 2022 ====
At the start of 2022, Hadjar raced in the Formula Regional Asian Championship with Hitech Grand Prix. Hadjar started off the season with a podium in Yas Marina, he would also claim a double rostrum in round 2. Hadjar secured his first win of the year during the first race at the Dubai Autodrome, where he withstood heavy pressure from Paul Aron. Hadjar would once again triumph in the final race of the campaign in Abu Dhabi from pole, meaning he finished third in the standings.

=== FIA Formula 3 (2022–2023) ===
==== 2022: Third in the championship ====
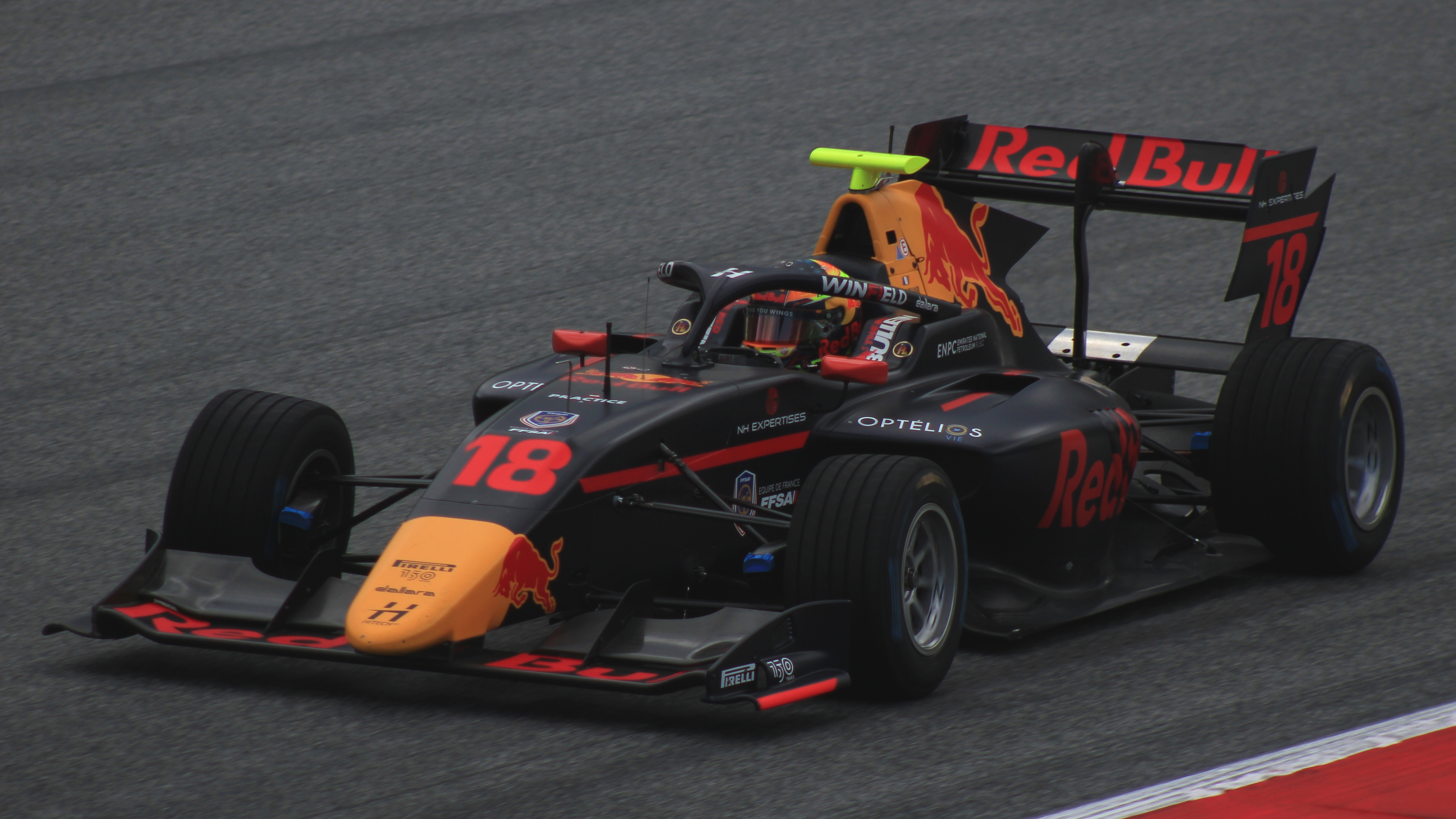
Hadjar driving the Dallara F3 2019 during the 2022 Spielberg Formula 3 round

In November 2021, Hadjar drove for Hitech Grand Prix in the FIA Formula 3 post-season test. He would eventually be announced to drive for the team in the 2022 season in January. He started his season out in the best way possible, inheriting victory in the Sakhir sprint race after original winner Oliver Bearman had received a five-second time penalty for track limits infringements. The feature race would be less successful, as Hadjar finished 25th after suffering a puncture caused by contact with Alexander Smolyar. Qualifying seventh in Imola, Hadjar made his way to the podium places in the sprint race, but a collision with Caio Collet on the last lap dropped him to fifth place. Hadjar returned to the podium during the feature race, benefitting from a last corner collision between Bearman and Grégoire Saucy to finish third. A fourth place in qualifying followed in Barcelona, he battled in the lower end of the points and finished tenth. He would finish third the next day, after Hadjar passed Smolyar at the start of lap 1. At Silverstone, a mistake on his qualifying lap confined him to ninth on the grid. In the sprint race, he moved up two places to second in the first half of the race before overtaking Victor Martins on the penultimate lap, allowing Hadjar to take his second win. before finishing fifth on Sunday following a fierce fight with fellow Red Bull junior Jak Crawford. Hadjar made overtakes to finish fifth in the feature race.

Hadjar put himself into championship contention by taking pole in Spielberg. After scoring one point on Saturday, Hadjar converted his pole into a lights-to-flag feature race win in rainy conditions. Hadjar qualified tenth in Hungary and moved up to second in the sprint race, but a mistake saw him slip to fourth place. Hadjar experienced a challenging race on Sunday as a poor start meant he ended up in 18th. A mixed-weather qualifying session at Spa yielded a disappointing 23rd place for Hadjar, though he progressed enough to score two points in the sprint race, where he finished ninth. Hadjar lost the championship lead at the penultimate round in Zandvoort, despite scoring a sixth and fifth place in the races. In a close championship fight between seven drivers, Hadjar put a dent into his title aspirations by crashing at the final corner during qualifying in Monza, meaning he would start from 16th. Contact with Kush Maini during the sprint race necessitated a front wing change, which left him down in 27th. He would finish ninth on Sunday, meaning that Hadjar finished fourth in the drivers' standings, with three wins, one pole, five podiums and 123 points.

==== 2023: Return to F3 in Macau ====
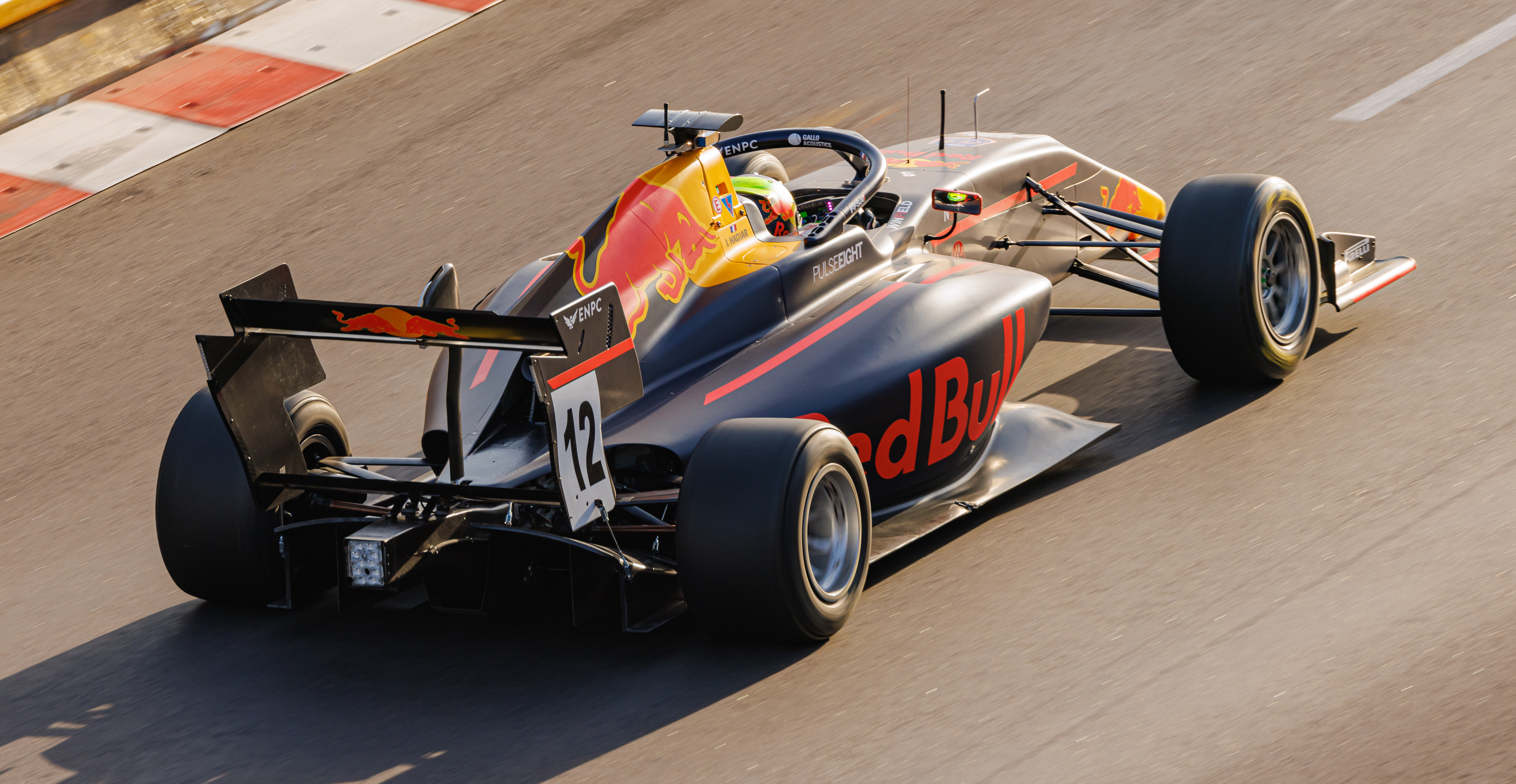
Hadjar in the 2023 Macau Grand Prix

Hadjar returned to Formula 3 to participate in the 2023 Macau Grand Prix with Hitech Pulse-Eight for the final edition of the FIA Formula 3 World Cup. He would qualify fourth for the Qualification Race before finishing ninth and seventh in the Qualification Race and Main Race respectively.

=== FIA Formula 2 (2023–2024) ===
==== 2023: Rookie season ====
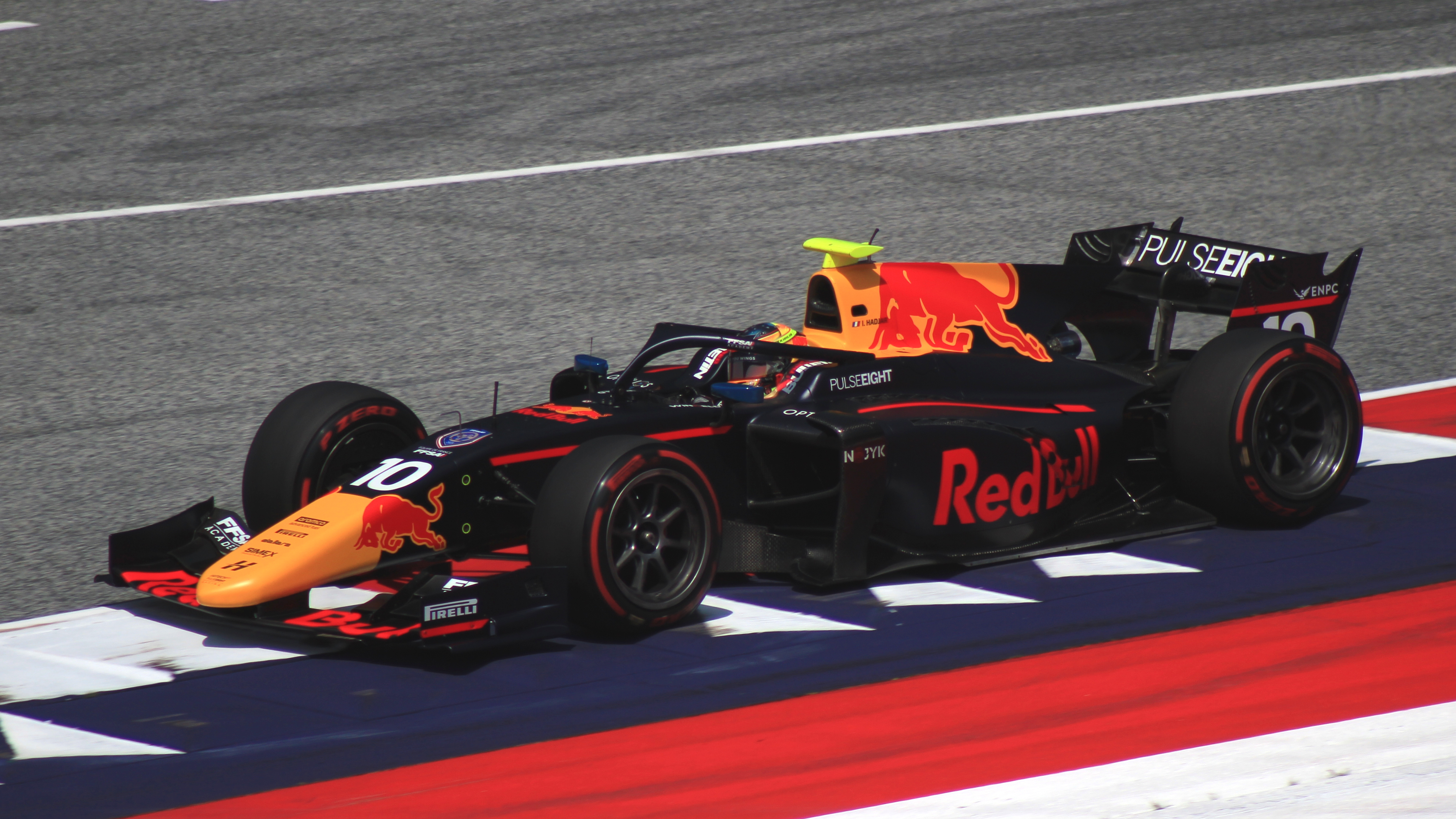
Hadjar driving the Dallara F2 2018 during the 2023 Spielberg Formula 2 round

Having tested for Hitech at the 2022 F2 post-season test at Yas Marina, Hadjar joined the team for the 2023 Formula 2 season alongside his then fellow Red Bull junior Jak Crawford. On debut in Bahrain, Hadjar qualified 14th and finished 20th on Saturday after struggling with his tyres, but ended up seventh in the feature race. He scored more points in Jeddah, finishing ninth on Sunday after qualifying 19th. He then qualified fourth at Albert Park and finished sixth on Saturday, but finished outside of the points on Sunday after suffering front wing damage due to contact with Oliver Bearman during a pit stop, as well as a subsequent penalty. This was followed up by a charge from 18th to eighth in the Baku sprint race, though he was demoted to 11th for illegally overtaking Jack Doohan during the safety car restart. He bounced back by finishing seventh in the feature race after trying an alternative strategy.

Hadjar qualified tenth in Monaco meaning he would start the sprint from pole; he led until lap 6 when a mechanical failure put him out of the race. He subsequently finished 12th in the feature race and later experienced another scoreless weekend in Barcelona. Hadjar qualified 21st in Austria and took a gamble in the sprint race, starting on slick tyres on a drying track. This paid off as he progressed to fourth by the chequered flag, before being promoted to third following a disqualification for Clément Novalak. In the feature race Hadjar finished 12th. Hadjar qualified ninth in Silverstone, where he battled for the podium spots in the sprint race but eventually finished fifth. A poor strategy choice in the feature race led to a finish outside of the points. Hadjar qualified fifth in Hungary, and he held off championship leader Frederik Vesti to finish eighth in the sprint race. In his best Sunday showing of the year thus far, Hadjar ended where he started in fifth.

A week later, Hadjar crashed into the pit exit wall during the feature race in Spa-Francorchamps, ending his chance for points. He started the Zandvoort sprint race from the front and held the lead as a multi-car accident caused the race to be halted; the subsequent rain shower led to the event's abandonment, as Hadjar was awarded victory but no points as less than two racing laps had been completed. He finished the feature race in sixth place. A frustrating weekend at Monza followed, as Hadjar qualified fourth but failed to score points during the races, most notably damaging his front wing on the opening lap of the feature race. At the season finale in Yas Marina Hadjar ran second in the opening laps of the sprint race, though he eventually dropped to fifth by the end. Hadjar ended his season with an eighth place in the feature race, his second double-points result of the season.

Hadjar finished the year 14th in the drivers' standings with 55 points, two behind teammate Crawford.

==== 2024: Title battle vs. Bortoleto and le Petit Prost ====
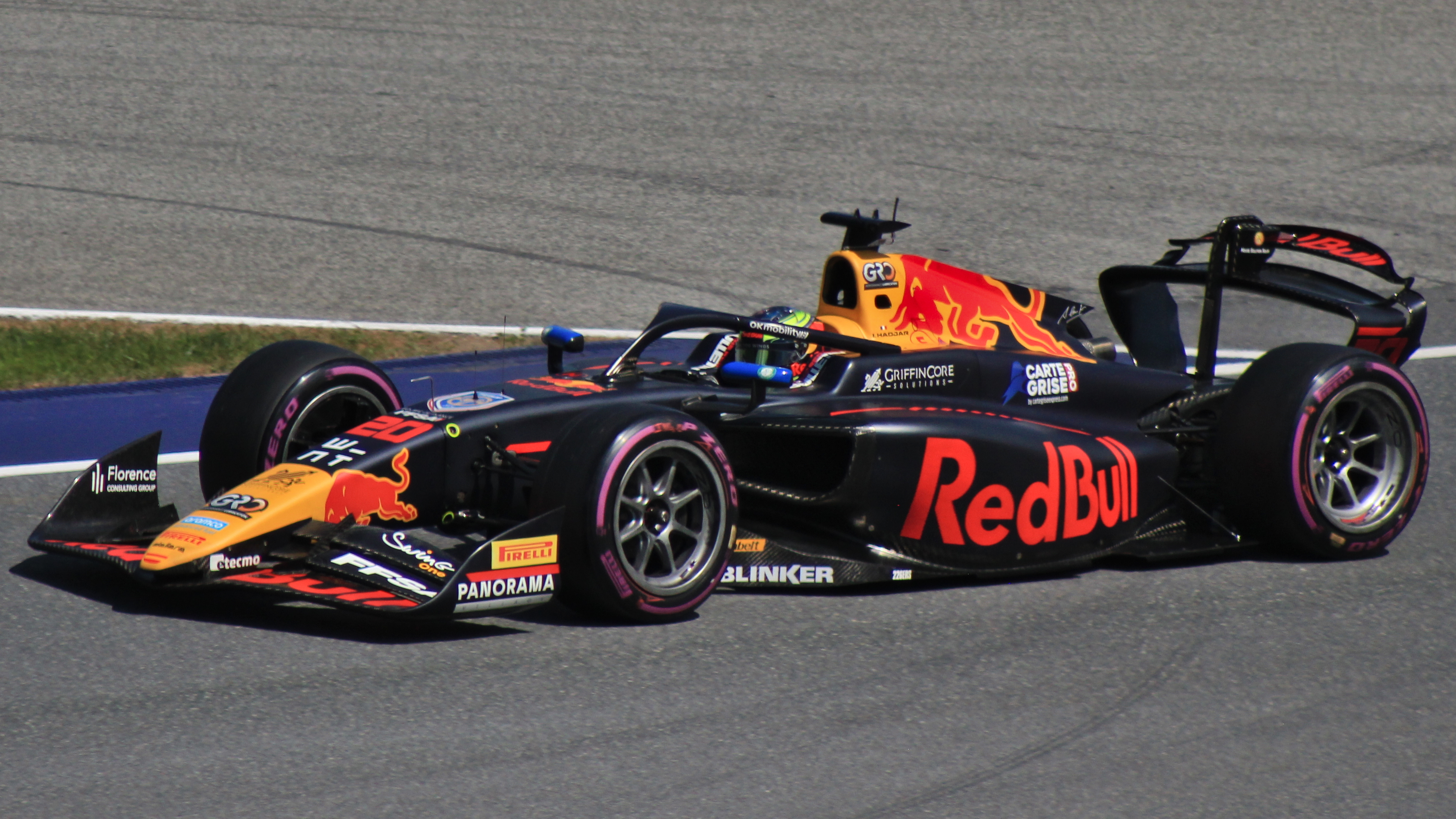
Hadjar driving for Campos Racing during the 2024 Spielberg Formula 2 round

Hadjar switched to Campos Racing for the 2024 Formula 2 season, teaming up with fellow Red Bull junior Pepe Martí. After qualifying second in Sakhir, He moved up through the field and finished the sprint race in fourth, after a battle with teammate Martí. However, Hadjar was spun around by Gabriel Bortoleto and collected by Enzo Fittipaldi at the first corner of the feature race, ending his race. In Jeddah, Hadjar experienced a woeful weekend as he was forced to retire from the sprint whilst running sixth on the penultimate lap due to an engine issue and retired again on Sunday with another issue. Hadjar qualified eighth in Melbourne. At the start of the sprint race, Hadjar wedged his teammate Martí into Bortoleto whilst taking the lead. He then dominated the sprint to win his first race in F2, but was demoted to sixth after being given a ten-second penalty for the incident. In the feature race, Hadjar passed multiple cars following a safety car interruption and held the net race lead thereafter to claim his first victory. After the victory, Le Parisien described Hadjar as "le Petit Prost" (lit. 'the Little Prost').

Hadjar's impressive qualifying form continued into Imola, where he qualified third. He was involved in a multi-car collision during the opening lap of the sprint race, which took him out of the running. Despite that, he bounced back by winning his second successive feature event, having taken the lead following a slow pit stop for Oliver Bearman before defending against Bortoleto in the dying laps. Hadjar qualified third in Monaco again, he finished the sprint race in eighth. Another Sunday win looked on the cards as he led after polesitter Richard Verschoor suffered with car issues, but a late virtual safety car (VSC) on the penultimate lap allowed Zak O'Sullivan to make his mandatory pit stop and come out ahead of Hadjar, who ended up finishing second. Hadjar's good run of form was stopped as he qualified 11th at Barcelona, though he managed to finish sixth and fifth in the races. Hadjar then qualified seventh in Austria after experiencing an engine failure during the session; a subsequent issue with the new engine forced the team to run it with limited power. The problem was rectified before Sunday's race, where Hadjar finished third after a battle with teammate Martí before being passed by Franco Colapinto on the last lap.

A week later, Hadjar took his first F2 pole for Silverstone. He retired from the sprint after spinning out at Copse corner on lap 8. Despite a slow start, Hadjar bounced back to win the feature race, inheriting victory after Jak Crawford had been penalised for an unsafe release; this put Hadjar into the lead of the championship. Hadjar qualified third in Hungary. In the sprint race, despite starting on the soft tyres, Hadjar managed them well to finish fourth on the road, before being promoted to the rostrum due to a disqualification for original winner Verschoor. However, Hadjar was forced to start from the pit lane on Sunday and he eventually finished 18th. Hadjar qualified third in Belgium and finished the shortened sprint in ninth. For the feature race, Hadjar took the lead on lap 8 and held off title rival Bortoleto after their pit stops to take his fourth win of the season, leaving him with a 36-point lead over Bortoleto going into the summer break.

However, the following round at Monza yielded no points for Hadjar, despite qualifying on the front row. After finishing tenth in the sprint race, his luck took a turn for the worse when he pitted just before the safety car deployment, causing him to lose positions. In contrast, Bortoleto benefitted from the safety car to win the feature race. He started 20th in both Baku races after crashing turn 1 during qualifying due to overheating brakes. His low starting position meant Hadjar failed to score points again, causing Bortoleto to pass him in the standings. After a two-month break, Hadjar qualified ninth for the round in Qatar, meaning he started second on Saturday. He passed Oliver Bearman on lap 2 of the sprint and built up a three-second lead before his tyres ran out and he was repassed by Bearman on lap 21. Hadjar then spun, dropping to fourth by the flag. In the feature race Hadjar benefitted from a safety car that allowed him to jump up to third place behind title rivals Bortoleto and Paul Aron. Bortoleto received a penalty for crossing the pit entry line and Hadjar was promoted to second at the finish, allowing him to reduce Bortoleto's lead to half a point going into the season finale.

Hadjar qualified fourth in Abu Dhabi and finished fifth on Saturday, after suffering front wing damage on the first lap after contact with Kush Maini. Though Hadjar was promoted to third on the feature race grid after Aron was forced to start from the pit lane, Hadjar stalled at the start of the feature race. Bortoleto finished second and took the title, while Hadjar finished second overall. On his title loss, Hadjar said "all that hard work for this to happen, I can't believe it, this is the worst moment of my life". Hadjar would end his final F2 season as runner-up in the Drivers' Championship finishing with four wins, eight podiums, one pole position, one fastest lap and 192 points compared to teammate Marti's 62.

== Formula One career ==
In June 2021, Red Bull announced that Hadjar was to become a member of the Red Bull Junior Team in 2022. Hadjar made his free practice debut at the 2023 Mexico City Grand Prix with AlphaTauri, to fulfill the mandatory rookie driver rule. Before the weekend, Hadjar admitted that he felt "apprehension", having not driven a Formula One car prior. He ended the session in seventeenth, second-highest of the five rookies who participated. He then drove for Red Bull during the Abu Dhabi practice, finishing the session in seventeenth again.

In 2024, Hadjar ended nineteenth in free practice one at the British Grand Prix with Red Bull. In September, he was promoted to replace Liam Lawson as the reserve driver for both Red Bull and the rebranded Racing Bulls as Lawson replaced Daniel Ricciardo from the United States Grand Prix onwards. Later that year, he took part in free practice during the Abu Dhabi Grand Prix, driving Max Verstappen's RB20; he finished the session in fifteenth. Hadjar also drove the RB20 in the post-season Abu Dhabi rookie test, where his pace—faster than that of future teammate Yuki Tsunoda—impressed team principal Christian Horner.

=== Racing Bulls (2025) ===
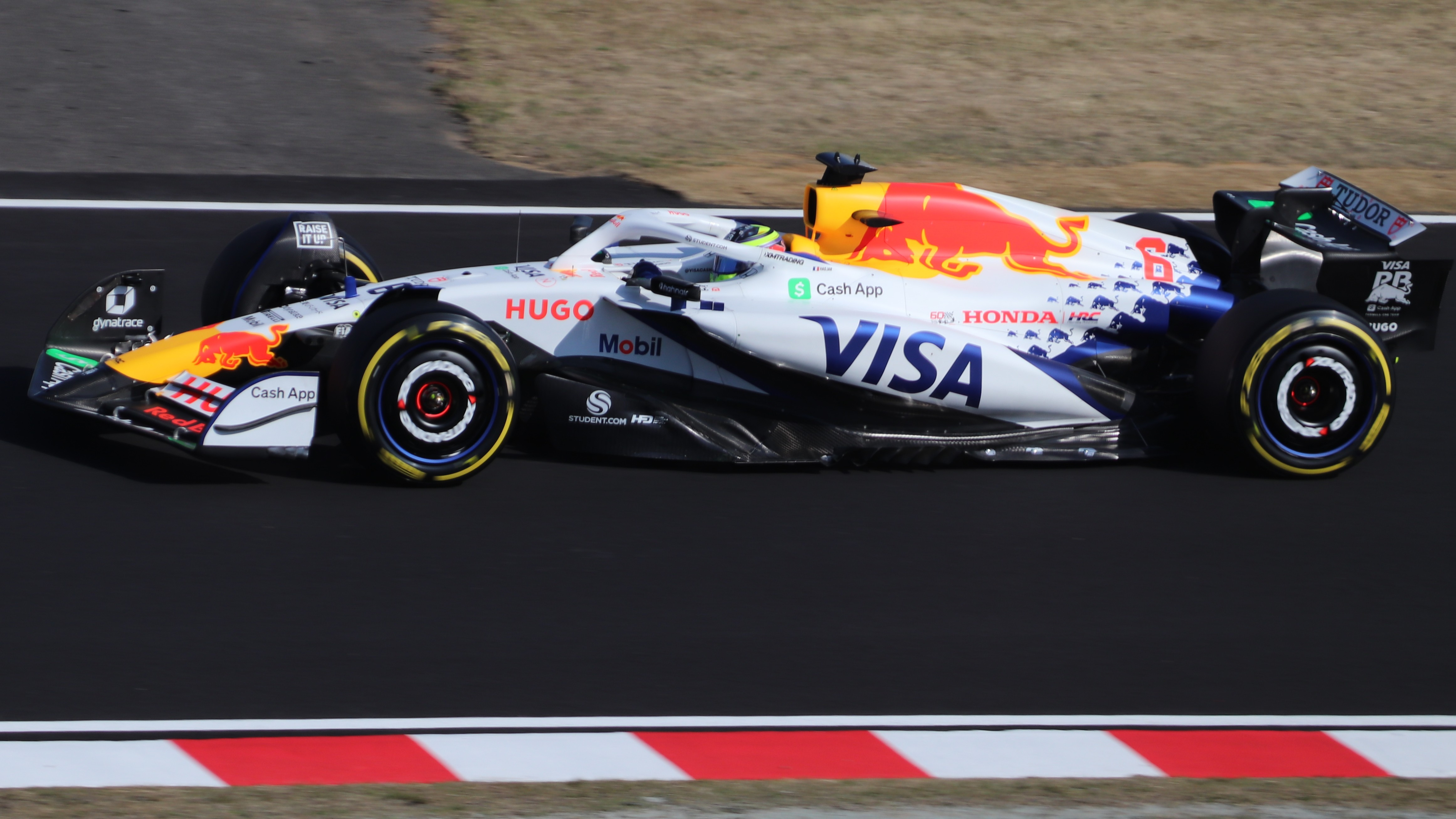
Hadjar (pictured at the Japanese Grand Prix) debuted in Formula One with Racing Bulls in 2025.

Following the promotion of Liam Lawson to Red Bull, Hadjar partnered Yuki Tsunoda at Racing Bulls for 2025. He qualified eleventh on debut at the Australian Grand Prix, before spinning into the barriers on the formation lap and failing to start the race. After finishing thirteenth in the Chinese Grand Prix sprint, he qualified seventh for the main race and finished eleventh due to a strategic error. He qualified seventh again in Japan, before finishing eighth to claim his maiden points finish, now partnered by Lawson. He dropped outside the points with thirteenth in Bahrain, before claiming tenth at the Saudi Arabian Grand Prix on an alternate strategy. Tenth in the Miami sprint, he qualified and finished eleventh in the main race. He returned to the points in the following three Grands Prix: ninth, where he started, in Emilia Romagna; sixth after qualifying fifth in Monaco, where he helped teammate Lawson finish eighth; and seventh from ninth in Spain as he moved up to ninth in the World Drivers' Championship. He dropped to sixteenth at the Canadian Grand Prix after a grid penalty for impeding and twelfth in Austria amidst performance concerns with the VCARB 02. He retired from the rain-affected British Grand Prix in a rear-end collision with Kimi Antonelli in low visibility. His eighth-placed sprint finish in Belgium was followed by the same result in qualifying for the main race, where he dropped to last with a mechanical issue, before claiming eleventh at the Hungarian Grand Prix. He qualified fourth for the Dutch Grand Prix, where he held position from frontrunners Charles Leclerc and George Russell before passing the retiring Lando Norris near the end to clinch third, becoming the fifth-youngest podium finisher in Formula One history and the first Arab driver to do so. His sixteenth-placed qualifying in Italy led to a power unit switch under parc fermé conditions and a subsequent pit lane start for the Grand Prix, where he climbed to tenth. Following further points in Azerbaijan (10th), São Paulo (8th) and Las Vegas (6th after disqualifications for both McLaren drivers), Hadjar finished 12th in the Drivers' Championship, with 51 points.

=== Red Bull (2026) ===
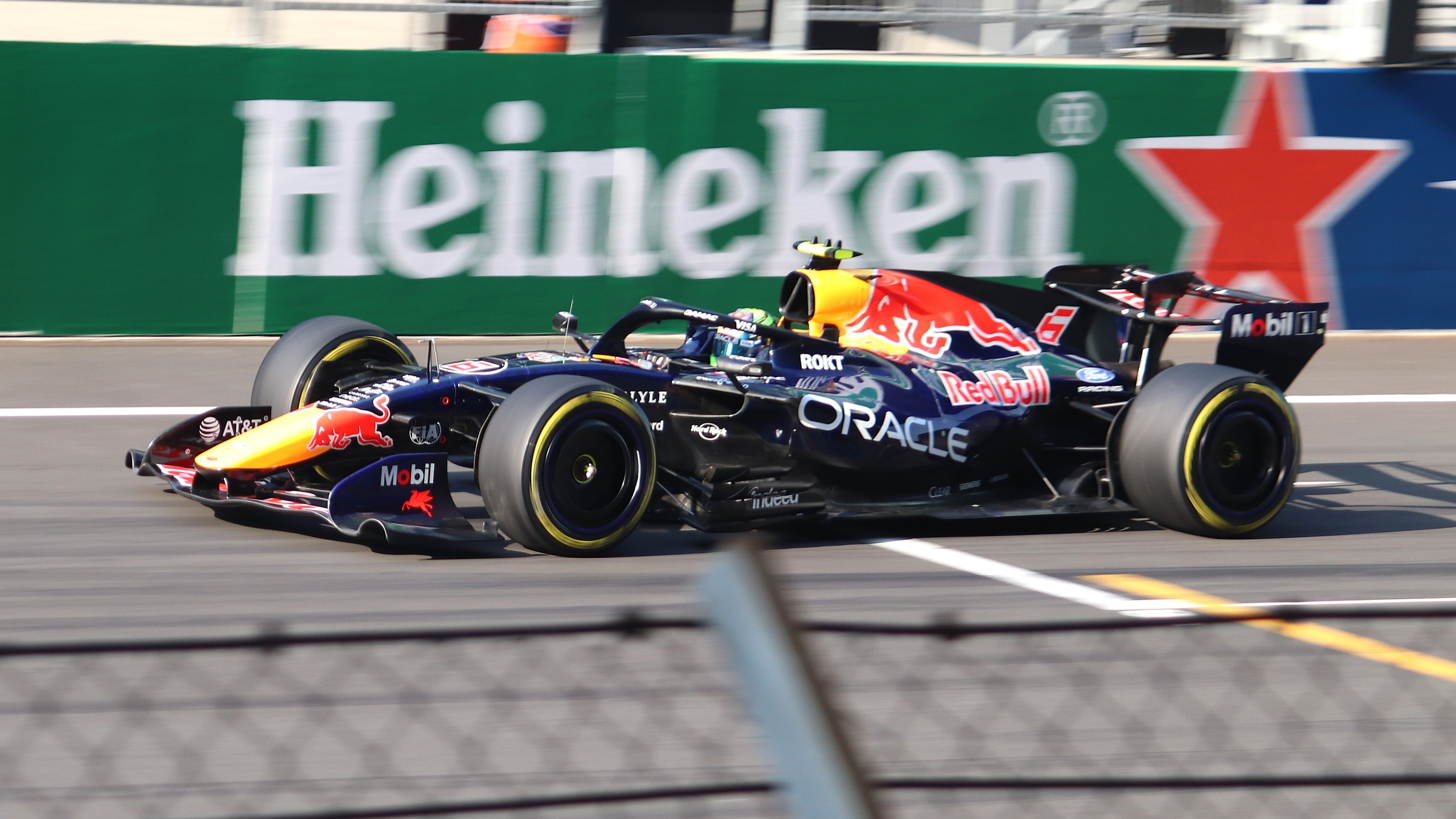
Hadjar driving the RB22 at the 2026 Chinese Grand Prix

In December 2025, it was announced that Hadjar would be replacing Yuki Tsunoda at Red Bull for 2026.

Hadjar made his racing debut with Red Bull at the Australian Grand Prix. After his teammate, Max Verstappen, crashed out of Q1, Hadjar qualified in third place, only to lose it with an early engine failure during the race. Both Red Bulls - with Hadjar in fifteenth - came out pointless at the Chinese Grand Prix sprint event, though was the team's only points-scorer in eighth from a ninth-place start after Verstappen experienced a coolant leak. He qualified in eighth in Japan, though finished a pointless twelfth.

Hadjar experienced a poor Miami Grand Prix: after another pointless finish during the sprint, qualifying and finishing ninth, he was disqualified from ninth in Grand Prix qualifying, broke parc fermé, started from the pit lane, and then crashed out of the race on lap four while trying to navigate the turn 14 chicane.

Following a top-five finish next time out in Canada, Hadjar finished fourth on the road at the Monaco Grand Prix, and was promoted to third after a time penalty for Pierre Gasly. The podium was temporarily rescinded following an appeal that overturned Gasly's penalty, but was ultimately reinstated after another right of review.

Hadjar missed the Dutch Grand Prix, the Italian Grand Prix, and the Spanish Grand Prix, after sustaining a wrist injury during a summer break training session. He was replaced by former teammate Liam Lawson, who in turn had his Racing Bulls seat taken by Yuki Tsunoda. After missing three races, he returned at the Azerbaijan Grand Prix. On the same weekend, Red Bull announced that Hadjar would continue at the team for 2027. Hadjar finished third on his comeback, securing his third career F1 podium.

== Karting record ==
=== Karting career summary ===
Season	Series	Team	Position
2014	Championnat Regional Île-de-France – Minime		12th
2014	Coupe de France – Minime		16th
2015	Trophée Interclub – Cadet		23rd
2015	National Series Karting – Cadet		24th
2015	Coupe de France – Cadet		NC
2015	Championnat de France – Cadet		7th
2016	Championnat de France – Cadet		20th
2016	Coupe de France – Cadet		**2nd**
2016	National Series Karting – Cadet		4th
2016	Challenge Rotax Max France – Cadet		**2nd**
2017	IAME International Open – X30 Junior		9th
2017	CIK-FIA European Championship – OKJ	Hadjar, Yassine	NC†
2017	Finale Nationale X30 – X30 Junior		7th
2017	Championnat de France – Junior	Sens	7th
2017	IAME International Final – X30 Junior		NC
2018	South Garda Winter Cup – OKJ		NC
2018	WSK Super Master Series – OKJ	Forza Racing	115th
2018	National Series Karting – Nationale		7th
2018	CIK-FIA European Championship – OKJ	Forza Racing	16th
2018	Coupe de France – Nationale	Forza Racing	6th
2018	CIK-FIA World Championship – OKJ	Forza Racing	22nd
2018	IAME International Final – X30 Junior	Forza Racing	23rd

=== Complete CIK-FIA Karting European Championship results ===
(key) (Races in bold indicate pole position) (Races in italics indicate fastest lap)

Year	Team	Class	1	2	3	4	5	6	7	8	9	10	DC	Points
2017	Hadjar, Yassine	OKJ	SAR; QH	SAR; R	CAY; QH	CAY; R	LEM; QH; 13	LEM; R 7	ALA; QH	ALA; R	KRI; QH	KRI; R	NC†	0
2018	Forza Racing	OKJ	SAR; QH; 53	SAR; R DNQ	PFI; QH; 8	PFI; R 19	AMP; QH; 27	AMP; R 27	LEM; QH; 10	LEM; R 7			16th	13

== Racing record ==
=== Racing career summary ===
Season	Series	Team	Races	Wins	Poles	F/Laps	Podiums	Points	Position
2018	Ginetta Junior Winter Championship	Elite Motorsport	3	0	0	0	0	0	NC
2019	French F4 Championship	FFSA Academy	20	1	0	1	2	118	7th
2020	Formula 4 UAE Championship	3Y Technology	8	0	0	0	0	56	11th
2020	French F4 Championship	FFSA Academy	21	3	2	6	11	233	**3rd**
2021	F3 Asian Championship	Evans GP	9	0	0	1	5	95	6th
2021	Formula Regional European Championship	R-ace GP	20	2	1	3	5	166	5th
2022	Formula Regional Asian Championship	Hitech Grand Prix	15	2	1	2	5	134	**3rd**
2022	FIA Formula 3 Championship	Hitech Grand Prix	18	3	1	2	5	123	4th
2023	FIA Formula 2 Championship	Hitech Pulse-Eight	26	0	0	1	1	55	14th
2023	Macau Grand Prix	Hitech Pulse-Eight	1	0	0	0	0	—N/a	7th
2023	Formula One	Scuderia AlphaTauri	Test driver						
2023	Formula One	Oracle Red Bull Racing	Test driver						
2024	FIA Formula 2 Championship	Campos Racing	28	4	1	2	8	192	**2nd**
2024	Formula One	Oracle Red Bull Racing	Reserve driver						
2024	Formula One	Visa Cash App RB F1 Team	Reserve driver						
2025	Formula One	Visa Cash App Racing Bulls F1 Team	24	0	0	0	1	51	12th
2026	Formula One	Oracle Red Bull Racing	17	0	0	0	3	122*	8th*

* Season still in progress.

=== Complete French F4 Championship results ===
(key) (Races in bold indicate pole position) (Races in italics indicate fastest lap)

Year	1	2	3	4	5	6	7	8	9	10	11	12	13	14	15	16	17	18	19	20	21	Pos	Points
2019	NOG; 1; 8	NOG; 2; 10	NOG; 3; 16	PAU; 1; 4	PAU; 2; 6	PAU; 3 DNS	SPA; 1; 1	SPA; 2; 17	SPA; 3; 7	LÉD; 1; 7	LÉD; 2; 4	LÉD; 3; 2	HUN; 1; 18	HUN; 2; 12	HUN; 3; 5	MAG; 1; 8	MAG; 2 Ret	MAG; 3; 5	LEC; 1 Ret	LEC; 2 Ret	LEC; 3; 4	7th	118
2020	NOG; 1; 3	NOG; 2; 6	NOG; 3 Ret	MAG; 1; 3	MAG; 2; 9	MAG; 3; 2	ZAN; 1; 4	ZAN; 2; 2	ZAN; 3; 4	LEC1; 1 Ret	LEC1; 2; 2	LEC1; 3; 2	SPA; 1; 3	SPA; 2 Ret	SPA; 3; 4	**LEC2**; **1**; 1	LEC2; 2; 3	**LEC2**; **3**; 1	LEC3; 1; 1	LEC3; 2; 5	LEC3; 3; 6	3rd	233

=== Complete Formula 4 UAE Championship results ===
(key) (Races in bold indicate pole position; races in italics indicate fastest lap)

Year	Team	1	2	3	4	5	6	7	8	9	10	11	12	13	14	15	16	17	18	19	20	DC	Points
2020	3Y Technology	DUB1; 1	DUB1; 2	DUB1; 3	DUB1; 4	YMC1; 1	YMC1; 2	YMC1; 3	YMC1; 4	YMC2; 1; 7	YMC2; 2 Ret	YMC2; 3; 5	YMC2; 4; 5	DUB2; 1	DUB2; 2	DUB2; 3	DUB2; 4	DUB3; 1; 5	DUB3; 2; 6	DUB3; 3; 4	DUB3; 4 Ret	11th	56

=== Complete Formula Regional Asian Championship results ===
(key) (Races in bold indicate pole position) (Races in italics indicate the fastest lap of top ten finishers)

Year	Entrant	1	2	3	4	5	6	7	8	9	10	11	12	13	14	15	DC	Points
2021	Evans GP	DUB; 1; 8	DUB; 2; 3	DUB; 3; 4	ABU; 1; 3	ABU; 2; 2	ABU; 3; 3	ABU; 1; 10	ABU; 2 Ret	ABU; 3; 3	DUB; 1	DUB; 2	DUB; 3	ABU; 1	ABU; 2	ABU; 3	6th	95
2022	Hitech Grand Prix	ABU; 1; 4	ABU; 2; 16†	ABU; 3; 3	DUB; 1; 8	DUB; 2; 3	DUB; 3; 3	DUB; 1; 5	DUB; 2; 11	DUB; 3 Ret	DUB; 1; 1	DUB; 2; 11	DUB; 3; 10	ABU; 1; 4	ABU; 2; 25	**ABU**; **3**; 1	3rd	134

=== Complete Formula Regional European Championship results ===
(key) (Races in bold indicate pole position) (Races in italics indicate fastest lap)

Year	Team	1	2	3	4	5	6	7	8	9	10	11	12	13	14	15	16	17	18	19	20	DC	Points
2021	R-ace GP	IMO; 1; 7	IMO; 2; 12	CAT; 1; 7	CAT; 2; 3	**MCO**; **1**; 1	MCO; 2; 2	LEC; 1; 21	LEC; 2; 4	ZAN; 1; 6	ZAN; 2; 11	SPA; 1; 7	SPA; 2; 9	RBR; 1; 12	RBR; 2; 6	VAL; 1; 9	VAL; 2; 4	MUG; 1; 12	MUG; 2; 13	MNZ; 1; 2	MNZ; 2; 1	5th	166

=== Complete FIA Formula 3 Championship results ===
(key) (Races in bold indicate pole position; races in italics indicate fastest lap)

Year	Entrant	1	2	3	4	5	6	7	8	9	10	11	12	13	14	15	16	17	18	DC	Points
2022	Hitech Grand Prix	BHR; SPR; 1	BHR; FEA; 25	IMO; SPR; 5	IMO; FEA; 3	CAT; SPR; 10	CAT; FEA; 3	SIL; SPR; 1	SIL; FEA; 5	RBR; SPR; 10	**RBR**; **FEA**; 1	HUN; SPR; 4	HUN; FEA; 18	SPA; SPR; 9	SPA; FEA; 14	ZAN; SPR; 6	ZAN; FEA; 5	MNZ; SPR; 27	MNZ; FEA; 9	4th	123

=== Complete Macau Grand Prix results ===
Year	Team	Car	Qualifying	Quali Race	Main race
2023	(United Kingdom) Hitech Pulse-Eight	Dallara F3 2019	4th	9th	7th

=== Complete FIA Formula 2 Championship results ===
(key) (Races in bold indicate pole position) (Races in italics indicate points for the fastest lap of top ten finishers)

Year	Entrant	1	2	3	4	5	6	7	8	9	10	11	12	13	14	15	16	17	18	19	20	21	22	23	24	25	26	27	28	DC	Points
2023	Hitech Pulse-Eight	BHR; SPR; 20	BHR; SPR; 7	JED; SPR; 12	JED; FEA; 9	MEL; SPR; 6	MEL; FEA; 15	BAK; SPR; 11	BAK; FEA; 7	MCO; SPR; Ret	MCO; FEA; 12	CAT; SPR; 12	CAT; FEA; 20	RBR; SPR; 3	RBR; FEA; 12	SIL; SPR; 5	SIL; FEA; 15	HUN; SPR; 8	HUN; FEA; 5	SPA; SPR; 11	SPA; FEA; Ret	ZAN; SPR; 1	ZAN; FEA; 6	MNZ; SPR; 11	MNZ; FEA; 11	YMC; SPR; 5	YMC; FEA; 8			14th	55
2024	Campos Racing	BHR; SPR; 4	BHR; FEA; Ret	JED; SPR; 15†	JED; FEA; Ret	MEL; SPR; 6	MEL; FEA; 1	IMO; SPR; Ret	IMO; FEA; 1	MON; SPR; 8	MON; FEA; 2	CAT; SPR; 6	CAT; FEA; 5	RBR; SPR; 13	RBR; FEA; 3	SIL; SPR; Ret	**SIL**; **FEA**; 1	HUN; SPR; 3	HUN; FEA; 18	SPA; SPR; 9	SPA; FEA; 1	MNZ; SPR; 10	MNZ; FEA; 11	BAK; SPR; 12	BAK; FEA; 14	LSL; SPR; 4	LSL; FEA; 2	YMC; SPR; 5	YMC; FEA; 19	2nd	192

=== Complete Formula One results ===
(key) (Races in bold indicate pole position) (Races in italics indicate fastest lap)

Year	Entrant	Chassis	Engine	1	2	3	4	5	6	7	8	9	10	11	12	13	14	15	16	17	18	19	20	21	22	23	24	WDC	Points
2023	Scuderia AlphaTauri	AlphaTauri AT04	Honda RBPTH001 1.6 V6 t	BHR	SAU	AUS	AZE	MIA	MON	ESP	CAN	AUT	GBR	HUN	BEL	NED	ITA	SIN	JPN	QAT	USA	MXC; TD	SAP	LVG				–	–
2023	Oracle Red Bull Racing	Red Bull RB19	Honda RBPTH001 1.6 V6 t																						ABU; TD			–	–
2024	Oracle Red Bull Racing	Red Bull RB20	Honda RBPTH002 1.6 V6 t	BHR	SAU	AUS	JPN	CHN	MIA	EMI	MON	CAN	ESP	AUT	GBR; TD	HUN	BEL	NED	ITA	AZE	SIN	USA	MXC	SAP	LVG	QAT	ABU; TD	–	–
2025	Visa Cash App Racing Bulls F1 Team	Racing Bulls VCARB 02	Honda RBPTH003 1.6 V6 t	AUS; DNS	CHN; 11	JPN; 8	BHR; 13	SAU; 10	MIA; 11	EMI; 9	MON; 6	ESP; 7	CAN; 16	AUT; 12	GBR; Ret	BEL; 20^{8}	HUN; 11	NED; 3	ITA; 10	AZE; 10	SIN; 11	USA; 16	MXC; 13	SAP; 8	LVG; 6	QAT; 18†	ABU; 17	12th	51
2026	Oracle Red Bull Racing	Red Bull Racing RB22	Red Bull Ford DM01 1.6 V6 t	AUS; Ret	CHN; 8	JPN; 12	MIA; Ret	CAN; 5	MON; 3	BCN; 6	AUT; 6	GBR; 5	BEL; 6	HUN; 6	NED	ITA	ESP	AZE; 3	BHR; 5	SIN; 10	USA; 6	MXC; 9	SAP; 3	LVG	QAT	ABU		8th*	122*

* Season still in progress.

== Notes ==
Sporting positions
Preceded by Inaugural	Formula Regional European Championship; Rookie Champion; 2021	Succeeded by Leonardo Fornaroli
