= Imola Grand Prix =

Imola Grand Prix may refer to:

- City of Imola motorcycle Grand Prix
- 1963 Imola Grand Prix, a non-championship Formula One race
- San Marino Grand Prix, held at the Autodromo Internazionale Enzo e Dino Ferrari and sometimes referred to as the Imola Grand Prix
- Emilia-Romagna Grand Prix, also held at the Autodromo Internazionale Enzo e Dino Ferrari and sometimes referred to as the Imola Grand Prix

== See also ==
- Autodromo Internazionale Enzo e Dino Ferrari, often called the Imola Circuit
