= 2025 Emilia-Romagna Grand Prix =

Formula One motor race

Race 7 of 24 in the 2025 Formula One World Championship
← Previous race	Next race →
- Layout of the Autodromo Internazionale Enzo e Dino Ferrari

Race details
- Date: 18 May 2025
- Official name: Formula 1 AWS Gran Premio del Made in Italy e dell'Emilia-Romagna 2025
- Location: Autodromo Internazionale Enzo e Dino Ferrari; Imola, Emilia-Romagna, Italy
- Course: Permanent racing facility
- Course length: 4.909 km (3.050 mi)
- Distance: 63 laps, 309.051 km (192.035 mi)
- Weather: Sunny
- Attendance: 242,000

Pole position
Driver	(Australia) Oscar Piastri	McLaren-Mercedes
- Time: 1:14.670

Fastest lap
Driver	(Netherlands) Max Verstappen	Red Bull Racing-Honda RBPT
- Time: 1:17.988 on lap 58

Podium
First	(Netherlands) Max Verstappen	Red Bull Racing-Honda RBPT
Second	(United Kingdom) Lando Norris	McLaren-Mercedes
Third	(Australia) Oscar Piastri	McLaren-Mercedes

The 2025 Emilia-Romagna Grand Prix (officially known as the Formula 1 AWS Gran Premio del Made in Italy e dell'Emilia-Romagna 2025) was a Formula One motor race that was held on 18 May 2025 at the Autodromo Internazionale Enzo e Dino Ferrari in Imola, Italy. It was the seventh round of the 2025 Formula One World Championship and the final Emilia-Romagna Grand Prix as it is not contracted for the 2026 season and beyond.

Oscar Piastri of McLaren took pole position for the event, which was won by Red Bull Racing's Max Verstappen after overtaking Piastri into Variante Tamburello on the first lap and maintaining the lead to the finish; the McLarens of Lando Norris and Piastri completed the podium. This was Red Bull Racing's 400th Grand Prix appearance, and Sauber's 600th, in Formula One.

The result reduced Piastri's lead in the World Drivers' Championship to 13 points over teammate Norris, with Verstappen 22 points behind Piastri. While McLaren comfortably led the Constructors' Championship with 279 points, third-placed Red Bull decreased their deficit to 16 points over second-placed Mercedes.

== Background ==
The event was held at the Autodromo Internazionale Enzo e Dino Ferrari in Imola for the 32nd and final time in the circuit's history, having previously held one edition of the Italian Grand Prix and 26 editions of the San Marino Grand Prix, across the weekend of 16–18 May. The Grand Prix was the seventh round of the 2025 Formula One World Championship and the fifth running of the Emilia-Romagna Grand Prix.

This was the last Emilia-Romagna Grand Prix as it was discontinued after its contract to host its race until this season was not renewed.

=== Championship standings before the race ===
Going into the event, Oscar Piastri led the Drivers' Championship with 131 points, 16 points ahead of his teammate Lando Norris in second, and 32 ahead of Max Verstappen in third. McLaren, with 246 points, entered the race as the leader in the Constructors' Championship from Mercedes in second with 141 points, and Red Bull Racing third with 105 points.

=== Entrants ===
The drivers and teams were the same as published in the season entry list with two exceptions; Yuki Tsunoda at Red Bull Racing was in the seat originally held by Liam Lawson before the latter was demoted back to Racing Bulls from the Japanese Grand Prix onward, and Franco Colapinto replaced Jack Doohan at Alpine from this race onward until at least the Austrian Grand Prix on a rotating seat basis.

The event marked Red Bull Racing's 400th Grand Prix appearance, and Sauber's 600th Grand Prix appearance, including its appearances under the BMW Sauber name in 2006–2009 and the Alfa Romeo name in 2019–2023.

=== Tyre choices ===
Tyre supplier Pirelli brought the C4, C5, and C6 tyre compounds—the softest three in their range (designated hard, medium, and soft, respectively) for teams to use at the event.

== Practice ==
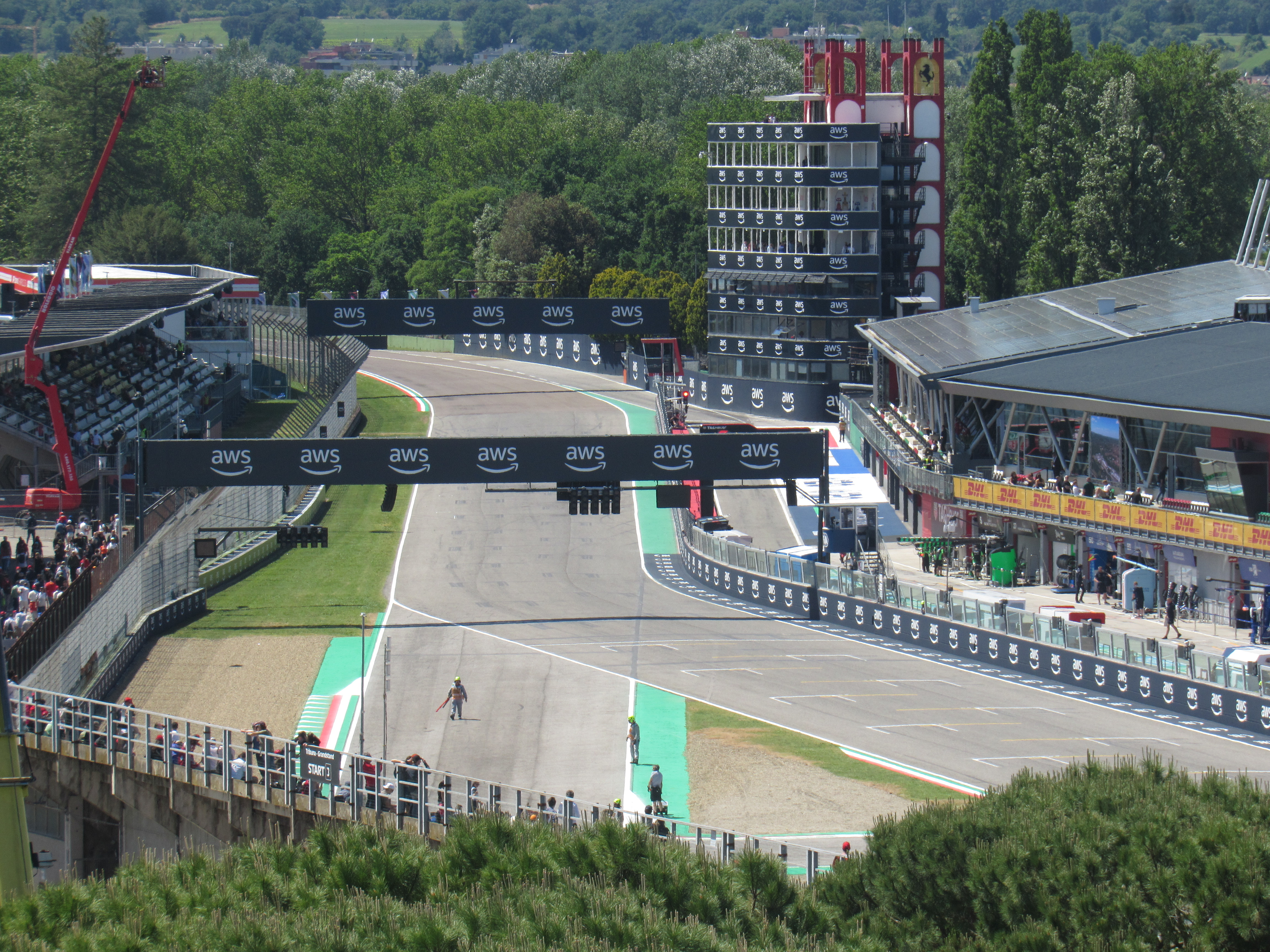
2025 marked the end of Imola's Formula One contract, having hosted the Emilia-Romagna Grand Prix since 2020.

Three free practice sessions were held for the event. The first free practice session was held on 16 May 2025, at 13:30 local time (UTC+2), and was topped by Oscar Piastri of McLaren ahead of his teammate Lando Norris and Carlos Sainz Jr. of Williams. A red flag was observed following a late minute crash of Gabriel Bortoleto of Sauber at turn 18. The second free practice session was held on the same day, at 17:00 local time, and was topped by Piastri followed by Norris and Pierre Gasly of Alpine. A red flag was needed as Isack Hadjar of Racing Bulls found the gravel at turn 4. The third free practice session was held on 17 May 2025, at 12:30 local time, and was topped by Norris ahead of Piastri and Max Verstappen of Red Bull Racing.

== Qualifying ==
Qualifying was held on 17 May 2025, at 16:00 local time (UTC+2), and determined the starting grid order for the race.

=== Qualifying report ===
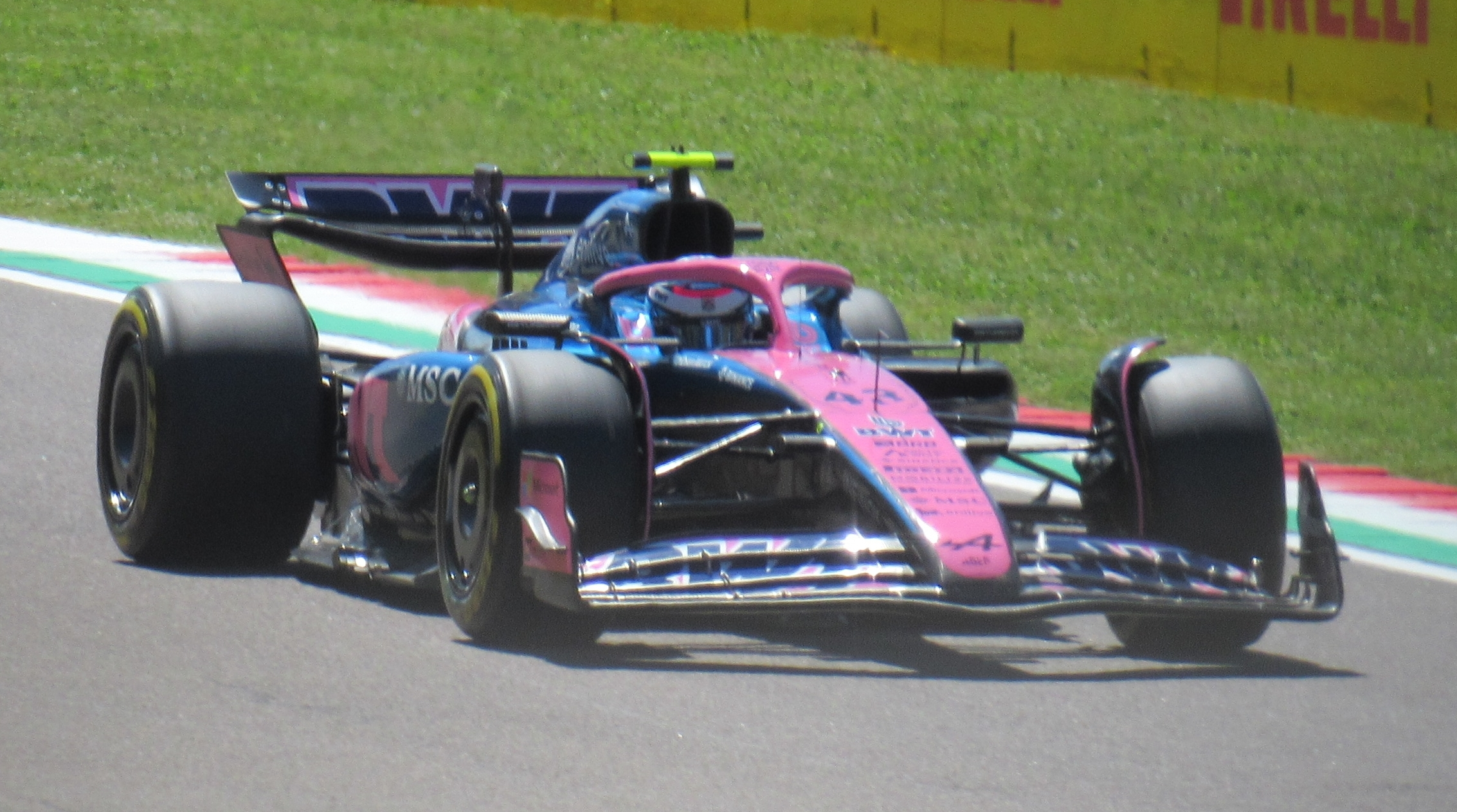
Colapinto made his Alpine debut and advanced to Q2. He would not take part in the session after spinning and hitting the wall at the end of Q1.

The opening segment of qualifying (Q1) was topped by Max Verstappen of Red Bull Racing, ahead of Oscar Piastri of McLaren and Fernando Alonso of Aston Martin. During the first segment, two red flags were observed. The first followed a crash for Verstappen's teammate Yuki Tsunoda at turn 6, who rolled his RB21 and caused significant damage. As such, he was ruled out of qualifying. The second was at turn 4, with Franco Colapinto, making his debut for Alpine, spinning and hitting the wall. The start of the second segment (Q2) was delayed due to repairs being made to the tyre barrier, and Colapinto, despite advancing, would not take part in Q2. Colapinto would take a further one-place grid penalty for the race. Following Q1, discussions were held between Haas and race control regarding their driver Oliver Bearman advancing into Q2 and knocking out Gabriel Bortoleto of Sauber, due to setting a representative lap just as the red flags were shown for Colapinto's crash. Bearman ultimately did not advance to Q2, and his lap time was deleted, relegating him to nineteenth.

Q2 was topped by Carlos Sainz Jr. in the Williams ahead of both McLarens: Piastri and Lando Norris. For the first time this season, the Ferrari cars suffered a double Q2 elimination, with Charles Leclerc eleventh and Lewis Hamilton twelfth. Kimi Antonelli of Mercedes also saw himself eliminated from the session. The final segment of qualifying (Q3) ended with Piastri, who took his third pole position of the season, ahead of Verstappen and George Russell of Mercedes.

=== Qualifying classification ===
Pos.	No.	Driver	Constructor	Qualifying times			Final grid
Pos.	No.	Driver	Constructor	Q1	Q2	Q3	Final grid
1	81	(Australia) Oscar Piastri	McLaren-Mercedes	1:15.500	1:15.214	1:14.670	1
2	1	(Netherlands) Max Verstappen	Red Bull Racing-Honda RBPT	1:15.175	1:15.394	1:14.704	2
3	63	(United Kingdom) George Russell	Mercedes	1:15.852	1:15.334	1:14.807	3
4	4	(United Kingdom) Lando Norris	McLaren-Mercedes	1:15.894	1:15.261	1:14.962	4
5	14	(Spain) Fernando Alonso	Aston Martin Aramco-Mercedes	1:15.695	1:15.442	1:15.431	5
6	55	(Spain) Carlos Sainz Jr.	Williams-Mercedes	1:15.987	1:15.198	1:15.432	6
7	23	(Thailand) Alexander Albon	Williams-Mercedes	1:16.123	1:15.521	1:15.473	7
8	18	(Canada) Lance Stroll	Aston Martin Aramco-Mercedes	1:15.817	1:15.497	1:15.581	8
9	6	(France) Isack Hadjar	Racing Bulls-Honda RBPT	1:16.253	1:15.510	1:15.746	9
10	10	(France) Pierre Gasly	Alpine-Renault	1:15.937	1:15.505	1:15.787	10
11	16	(Monaco) Charles Leclerc	Ferrari	1:16.108	1:15.604	N/A	11
12	44	(United Kingdom) Lewis Hamilton	Ferrari	1:16.163	1:15.765	N/A	12
13	12	(Italy) Kimi Antonelli	Mercedes	1:15.943	1:15.772	N/A	13
14	5	(Brazil) Gabriel Bortoleto	Kick Sauber-Ferrari	1:16.340	1:16.260	N/A	14
15	43	(Argentina) Franco Colapinto	Alpine-Renault	1:16.256	No time	N/A	16^{1}
16	30	(New Zealand) Liam Lawson	Racing Bulls-Honda RBPT	1:16.379	N/A	N/A	15
17	27	(Germany) Nico Hülkenberg	Kick Sauber-Ferrari	1:16.518	N/A	N/A	17
18	31	(France) Esteban Ocon	Haas-Ferrari	1:16.613	N/A	N/A	18
19	87	(United Kingdom) Oliver Bearman	Haas-Ferrari	1:16.918	N/A	N/A	19
—	22	(Japan) Yuki Tsunoda	Red Bull Racing-Honda RBPT	No time	N/A	N/A	PL^{2}
107% time: 1:20.437

Notes

- ^1 – Franco Colapinto qualified 15th, but received a one-place grid penalty for entering the fast lane in the pit lane before a re-start time was confirmed in Q1.
- ^2 – Yuki Tsunoda failed to set a time during qualifying. He was permitted to race at the stewards' discretion, but was required to start from the pit lane as his car was rebuilt by using several components of different specification under parc fermé conditions.

== Race ==
The race was held on 18 May 2025, at 15:00 local time (UTC+2), and was run for 63 laps.

=== Race report ===
Polesitter Oscar Piastri of McLaren had a better initial start than second-place Max Verstappen of Red Bull, who himself was challenged by the fast-starting George Russell of Mercedes. However, whilst attempting to block Russell's challenge from the inside, Piastri left the outside of the track clear, allowing Verstappen to brake late and pass him for the lead around the outside of Variante Tamburello. On lap 3, Charles Leclerc of Ferrari challenged Pierre Gasly of Alpine for 9th place into the Piratella corner, causing Gasly to run wide and drop down to 14th. Toward the front of the field, Piastri's teammate Lando Norris had closed in and was applying pressure to George Russell, who was rapidly losing time to Verstappen and Piastri ahead. On lap 11, Norris passed Russell around the outside for 3rd entering Variante Villeneuve, putting himself 11 seconds behind Piastri, who himself was two seconds behind race leader Verstappen.

On lap 14, Piastri became the first of the front three cars to pit, having observed Leclerc making a successful undercut on several drivers including Russell, Carlos Sainz of Williams and Fernando Alonso of Aston Martin. Whilst Piastri, now in 11th place on fresh hard tires, was initially able to gain time on leader Verstappen, this progress halted when Piastri caught the cars that had not yet pitted, including Verstappen's teammate Yuki Tsunoda. While Piastri was able work his way through the traffic, due to his newer tires and faster car, he was now losing significant amounts of time to Verstappen who had still not stopped. However, this would become irrelevant on lap 29, when Esteban Ocon of Haas pulled over with a mechanical failure on the exit of Tosa corner. The virtual safety car (VSC) was deployed, allowing yet-to-stop drivers to gain time by pitting under VSC conditions. Verstappen duly took advantage of this, as did Sainz's teammate Alexander Albon, Isack Hadjar of Racing Bulls, Russell's teammate Kimi Antonelli and Leclerc's teammate Lewis Hamilton, who were able to maintain positions 4th–7th. Piastri decided to make a second pit stop when the virtual safety car remained deployed onto the following lap, however this caused him to lose position to Norris, who had pitted shortly before the VSC was deployed, and Albon, meaning he would be 4th when green flag running resumed.

Verstappen now led the race from Norris by around 20 seconds. On lap 34, Hamilton passed Antonelli for 6th place around the outside of Tamburello before executing the same move on Hadjar two laps later, promoting him to 5th. On lap 40, Piastri passed Albon to move back into 3rd place. On lap 46 Antonelli, who had by then fallen to 8th place, pulled off at Tosa. On this occasion, however, the race director opted to deploy the full safety car, meaning the field would be bunched up for a restart. This provided drivers another chance to make a cheap pit stop, with Verstappen pitting and maintaining his lead while Norris pitted and dropped behind his teammate Piastri, who had chosen to stay out. This meant that when the race resumed on lap 53 Verstappen (on new tires) led Piastri on used tires, with Norris now in 3rd but on tires 15 laps younger than his teammate's.

Norris passed Piastri for 2nd around the outside of Tamburello on lap 58, leaving him 5 seconds behind race leader Verstappen. Leclerc had stayed out under the safety car, moving up to 4th position, but was now coming under immense pressure from Albon and Hamilton, both of whom were on new tires. On lap 60, Albon attempted to pass Leclerc around the outside of Tamburello but was pushed into the gravel trap, causing him to be overtaken by Hamilton. Hamilton then successfully executed the same move on Leclerc the following lap, allowing him to 4th position and ensuring that, for the first time in 2025, he would be the highest finishing Ferrari driver during the Grand Prix. To minimise the risk of receiving a penalty for forcing another driver off the track, Leclerc waved Albon through voluntarily at the beginning of the final lap. Verstappen won the race with a 6 second margin over Norris, taking the 65th Grand Prix victory of his career as well as his 4th victory at the Emilia-Romagna Grand Prix.

=== Race classification ===
Pos.	No.	Driver	Constructor	Laps	Time/Retired	Grid	Points
1	1	(Netherlands) Max Verstappen	Red Bull Racing-Honda RBPT	63	1:31:33.199	2	25
2	4	(United Kingdom) Lando Norris	McLaren-Mercedes	63	+6.109	4	18
3	81	(Australia) Oscar Piastri	McLaren-Mercedes	63	+12.956	1	15
4	44	(United Kingdom) Lewis Hamilton	Ferrari	63	+14.356	12	12
5	23	(Thailand) Alexander Albon	Williams-Mercedes	63	+17.945	7	10
6	16	(Monaco) Charles Leclerc	Ferrari	63	+20.774	11	8
7	63	(United Kingdom) George Russell	Mercedes	63	+22.034	3	6
8	55	(Spain) Carlos Sainz Jr.	Williams-Mercedes	63	+22.898	6	4
9	6	(France) Isack Hadjar	Racing Bulls-Honda RBPT	63	+23.586	9	2
10	22	(Japan) Yuki Tsunoda	Red Bull Racing-Honda RBPT	63	+26.446	PL	1
11	14	(Spain) Fernando Alonso	Aston Martin Aramco-Mercedes	63	+27.250	5	
12	27	(Germany) Nico Hülkenberg	Kick Sauber-Ferrari	63	+30.296	17	
13	10	(France) Pierre Gasly	Alpine-Renault	63	+31.424	10	
14	30	(New Zealand) Liam Lawson	Racing Bulls-Honda RBPT	63	+32.511	15	
15	18	(Canada) Lance Stroll	Aston Martin Aramco-Mercedes	63	+32.993	8	
16	43	(Argentina) Franco Colapinto	Alpine-Renault	63	+33.411	16	
17	87	(United Kingdom) Oliver Bearman	Haas-Ferrari	63	+33.808	19	
18	5	(Brazil) Gabriel Bortoleto	Kick Sauber-Ferrari	63	+38.572	14	
Ret	12	(Italy) Kimi Antonelli	Mercedes	44	Throttle	13	
Ret	31	(France) Esteban Ocon	Haas-Ferrari	27	Engine	18	

== Championship standings after the race ==
Drivers' Championship standings

Pos.	Driver	Points
1	(Australia) Oscar Piastri	146
2	(United Kingdom) Lando Norris	133
3	(Netherlands) Max Verstappen	124
4	(United Kingdom) George Russell	99
5	(Monaco) Charles Leclerc	61

Constructors' Championship standings

Pos.	Constructor	Points
1	(United Kingdom) McLaren-Mercedes	279
2	(Germany) Mercedes	147
3	(Austria) Red Bull Racing-Honda RBPT	131
4	(Italy) Ferrari	114
5	(United Kingdom) Williams-Mercedes	51

- Note: Only the top five positions are included for both sets of standings.

== See also ==
- 2025 Imola Formula 2 round
- 2025 Imola Formula 3 round

Previous race: 2025 Miami Grand Prix	FIA Formula One World Championship; 2025 season	Next race: 2025 Monaco Grand Prix
Previous race: 2024 Emilia-Romagna Grand Prix	Emilia-Romagna Grand Prix	Next race: None
