= 2021 Emilia-Romagna Grand Prix =

Second round of the 2021 Formula One season

Race 2 of 22 (Note: At the time of the event Formula One planned to hold twenty-three Grands Prix.) in the 2021 Formula One World Championship
← Previous race	Next race →
- Layout of the Autodromo Internazionale Enzo e Dino Ferrari

Race details
- Date: 18 April 2021
- Official name: Formula 1 Pirelli Gran Premio del Made in Italy e dell'Emilia Romagna 2021
- Location: Autodromo Internazionale Enzo e Dino Ferrari, Imola, Emilia-Romagna, Italy
- Course: Permanent racing facility
- Course length: 4.909 km (3.050 miles)
- Distance: 63 laps, 309.049 km (192.034 miles)
- Weather: Wet at start, drying during race, 9 °C (48 °F)
- Attendance: 0 (Note: The Grand Prix was held behind closed doors due to the COVID-19 pandemic in Italy.)

Pole position
Driver	(United Kingdom) Lewis Hamilton	Mercedes
- Time: 1:14.411

Fastest lap
Driver	(United Kingdom) Lewis Hamilton	Mercedes
- Time: 1:16.702 on lap 60

Podium
First	(Netherlands) Max Verstappen	Red Bull Racing-Honda
Second	(United Kingdom) Lewis Hamilton	Mercedes
Third	(United Kingdom) Lando Norris	McLaren-Mercedes

The 2021 Emilia-Romagna Grand Prix (officially known as the Formula 1 Pirelli Gran Premio del Made in Italy e dell'Emilia Romagna 2021) was a Formula One motor race which took place on 18 April 2021 at the Autodromo Internazionale Enzo e Dino Ferrari in Imola, Italy. The race, held in wet conditions, was the second round of the 2021 Formula One World Championship, and the second Emilia-Romagna Grand Prix.

Lewis Hamilton, who led the Drivers' Championship, started from pole position, but he was overtaken at the first corner by Max Verstappen of Red Bull Racing, who led the rest of the race and claimed victory. Hamilton managed to recover from a minor crash to take second place for the Mercedes team, just ahead of the McLaren of Lando Norris. The race was temporarily stopped halfway through after a high-speed crash involving Valtteri Bottas and George Russell.

Following the result, Hamilton maintained his lead, but Verstappen was able to reduce the gap to just one point. Norris's third place elevated him to third in the standings, whilst Leclerc improved to fourth, trailing Norris by seven points, with Bottas dropping down to fifth following his retirement. The top five in the Constructors' Championship remained unchanged; Red Bull managed to decrease the gap to Mercedes to seven points.

== Background ==
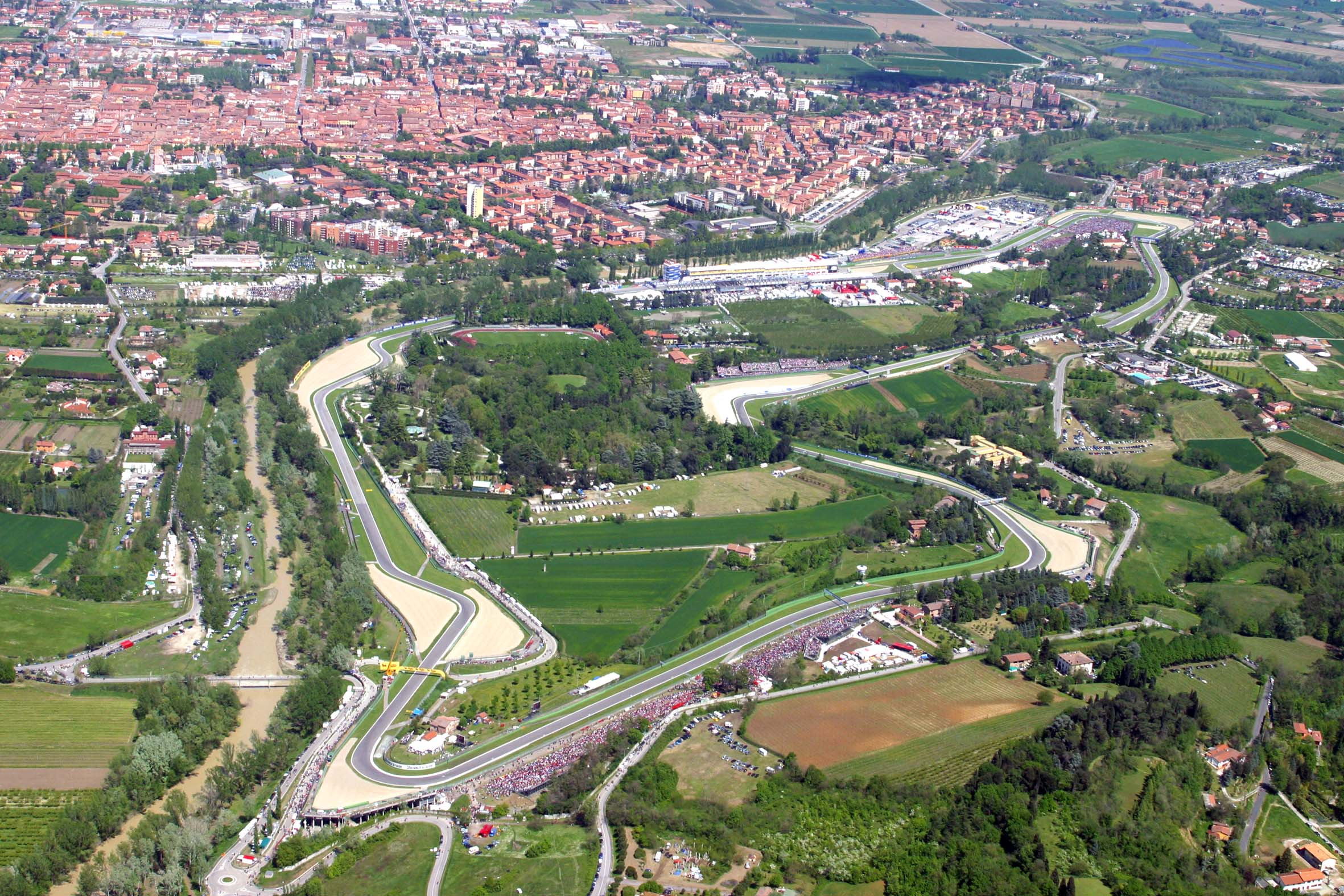
The circuit photographed from above.

The race was the second round of the 2021 Formula One World Championship, and the second running of the Emilia-Romagna Grand Prix. It was the twenty-ninth time Imola hosted a Formula One race, having previously hosted 26 editions of the San Marino Grand Prix and the 1980 Italian Grand Prix. Unlike the 2020 edition (which took place over two days), this event utilised the traditional three-day format.

The drivers and teams were the same as the season entry list with no additional stand-in drivers for the race. Tyre supplier Pirelli brought the C2, C3 and C4 tyre compounds (designated hard, medium and soft respectively) for teams to use at the event.

In March 2021, organisers announced that the race would be held behind closed doors due to the COVID-19 pandemic in Italy. The DRS zone located on the main straight would be longer than the previous edition of the race, to aid overtaking. The detection point was moved from the exit of the second Rivazza (turn 18) to the entrance of the said turn (turn 17).

Lewis Hamilton entered the weekend as both the defending race winner and the championship leader, with a seven-point lead over Max Verstappen of Red Bull Racing. Verstappen was considered the favourite to win the race, ahead of Hamilton and his teammate, Valtteri Bottas. Some teams had new parts on their cars for the first European race of the year, with Ferrari and Williams using their versions of the "z-shaped" floors Mercedes and Red Bull had utilised in Bahrain.

== Practice ==
There were three practice sessions, all an hour in length. The first practice session started at 11:00 local time (UTC+02:00) on Friday 16 April. The second practice session started at 14:30 local time on the same afternoon and the final practice session started at 11:00 on Saturday.

The first practice session ended with Bottas fastest ahead of Hamilton and Verstappen. The session was red flagged twice, the first time following a collision between Red Bull's Sergio Pérez and Alpine's Esteban Ocon at turns five and six, and a second time when Nikita Mazepin crashed at turn 18. The second practice session ended with Bottas fastest ahead of Hamilton and Pierre Gasly, driving for AlphaTauri. The session was interrupted twice, the first time when Verstappen stopped on track, resulting in the virtual safety car being deployed, and a second time when Charles Leclerc crashed his Ferrari, at the end of the session, bringing out the red flag. The final practice session ended with Verstappen fastest ahead of the McLaren of Lando Norris and Hamilton.

== Qualifying ==
The time of the qualifying session was moved to avoid a clash with the funeral of Prince Philip, Duke of Edinburgh, who died on 9 April; as a result the start times for the practice sessions were also adjusted. Before the start of qualifying, at 14:00 local time (UTC+02:00), there was a minute's silence to mark the Prince's death. The first part of qualifying (Q1) was red-flagged after Yuki Tsunoda spun and crashed heavily at the Variente Alta chicane. As only five drivers had set a time before Tsunoda's crash, the track was noticeably congested near the end of the session; In addition to Tsunoda, the eliminated drivers included both the Alfa Romeos of Kimi Raikkonen and Antonio Giovinazzi, and both the Haas cars of Mick Schumacher and Nikita Mazepin. Giovinazzi later issued a public criticism of Mazepin, who had overtaken the Italian driver on his last lap, forcing its abandonment. The second part of qualifying (Q2) was less eventful, but saw the surprise elimination of the Ferrari of Carlos Sainz Jr., who only managed eleventh place. Behind the Spaniard was George Russell, Sebastian Vettel, Russell's teammate Nicholas Latifi, and Fernando Alonso. Sergio Pérez topped the session, ahead of the McLaren of Lando Norris, who had performed impressively all weekend.

Lewis Hamilton took pole position for the 99th time in the final part of qualifying, just ahead of the Red Bull of Pérez, who confessed that he had lost time at the Rivazza double left-hander. Norris would have started on the front row for the first time in his career, had he not breached track limits at the fast Piratella curve, leading to his time being deleted; he started seventh. Pérez's teammate Max Verstappen thus qualified third, less than a tenth of a second behind Hamilton, while Charles Leclerc managed to take fourth place in the session. Behind them, Pierre Gasly and Daniel Ricciardo qualified fifth and sixth, while Hamilton's teammate Valtteri Bottas experienced a torrid session; having been first in Q1, he only managed eighth in Q3. The top ten was rounded out by Esteban Ocon and Lance Stroll, the latter of whom did not set a lap during the session.

=== Qualifying classification ===
Pos.	No.	Driver	Constructor	Qualifying times			Final grid
Pos.	No.	Driver	Constructor	Q1	Q2	Q3	Final grid
1	44	(United Kingdom) Lewis Hamilton	Mercedes	1:14.823	1:14.817	1:14.411	1
2	11	(Mexico) Sergio Pérez	Red Bull Racing-Honda	1:15.395	1:14.716	1:14.446	2
3	33	(Netherlands) Max Verstappen	Red Bull Racing-Honda	1:15.109	1:14.884	1:14.498	3
4	16	(Monaco) Charles Leclerc	Ferrari	1:15.413	1:14.808	1:14.740	4
5	10	(France) Pierre Gasly	AlphaTauri-Honda	1:15.548	1:14.927	1:14.790	5
6	3	(Australia) Daniel Ricciardo	McLaren-Mercedes	1:15.669	1:15.033	1:14.826	6
7	4	(United Kingdom) Lando Norris	McLaren-Mercedes	1:15.009	1:14.718	1:14.875	7
8	77	(Finland) Valtteri Bottas	Mercedes	1:14.672	1:14.905	1:14.898	8
9	31	(France) Esteban Ocon	Alpine-Renault	1:15.385	1:15.117	1:15.210	9
10	18	(Canada) Lance Stroll	Aston Martin-Mercedes	1:15.522	1:15.138	No time	10
11	55	(Spain) Carlos Sainz Jr.	Ferrari	1:15.406	1:15.199	N/A	11
12	63	(United Kingdom) George Russell	Williams-Mercedes	1:15.826	1:15.261	N/A	12
13	5	(Germany) Sebastian Vettel	Aston Martin-Mercedes	1:15.459	1:15.394	N/A	13
14	6	(Canada) Nicholas Latifi	Williams-Mercedes	1:15.653	1:15.593^{1}	N/A	14
15	14	(Spain) Fernando Alonso	Alpine-Renault	1:15.832	1:15.593^{1}	N/A	15
16	7	(Finland) Kimi Räikkönen	Alfa Romeo Racing-Ferrari	1:15.974	N/A	N/A	16
17	99	(Italy) Antonio Giovinazzi	Alfa Romeo Racing-Ferrari	1:16.122	N/A	N/A	17
18	47	(Germany) Mick Schumacher	Haas-Ferrari	1:16.279	N/A	N/A	18
19	9	(Russian Automobile Federation) Nikita Mazepin (Note: Nikita Mazepin is Russian, but he competed as a neutral competitor using the designation RAF (Russian Automobile Federation), as the Court of Arbitration for Sport upheld a ban on Russia competing at World Championships. The ban was implemented by the World Anti-Doping Agency in response to the state-sponsored doping program of Russian athletes.)	Haas-Ferrari	1:16.797	N/A	N/A	19
107% time: 1:19.899
—	22	(Japan) Yuki Tsunoda	AlphaTauri-Honda	No time	N/A	N/A	20^{2}

==== Notes ====
- ^1 – Nicholas Latifi and Fernando Alonso set identical lap in Q2. Latifi was classified ahead of Alonso as he had set his lap earlier.
- ^2 – Yuki Tsunoda failed to set a time during qualifying, but was permitted to race at the stewards' discretion. He also received a five-place grid penalty for an unscheduled gearbox change and was then required to start the race from the back of the grid for exceeding his quota for power unit components. These two penalties were not in force as he was already due to start the race from the back of the grid.

== Race ==
The race started at 15:00 local time (UTC+02:00) and was held over 63 laps. Heavy rain had fallen before the race, and on his way to the grid, Fernando Alonso lost control and hit the wall at Tosa; he managed to drive to the grid, where the Alpine mechanics were able to fix the damage. Sebastian Vettel had to start from the pitlane after his brakes overheated before the race, and was given a ten-second penalty when the team failed to fit his car's tyres before the five-minute deadline. Charles Leclerc was able to recover from a spin on the formation lap and start the race.

At the race start, Max Verstappen bolted off the line and managed to overtake both his teammate Sergio Pérez and polesitter Lewis Hamilton to take the lead; Hamilton was forced to drive over the kerbs on the outside of the Tamburello curve, which damaged his front wing. On the run up to the Variante Alta chicane, Nikita Mazepin was unable to avoid the Williams of Nicholas Latifi, who had run wide at the Acque Minerali right-hander; Mazepin's Haas emerged undamaged, but Latifi was spun into the wall, ending his race. During the resulting safety car, Mick Schumacher spun near the pit exit and lost his front wing, while Perez, after running into the gravel, illegally regained his position, an action which gained him a ten-second stop-go penalty. With the rain gradually ceasing, Vettel was the first driver to change onto slick tyres, which he did on lap 22. Verstappen, leading by just over a second from Hamilton, pitted on lap 27 for slicks; Hamilton, seeking to utilise the overcut, looked to be neck-and-neck with his rival when he came into the pits the next lap, but a comparatively slow pitstop dropped him back behind Verstappen.

On the thirty-first lap, Hamilton slid into the gravel at Tosa, while trying to lap the Williams of George Russell. He managed to stop his car clear of the barriers, but drove directly into the barriers while trying to rejoin the race, damaging his front wing. Soon after, Russell was involved in a 320 kilometres per hour (200 mph) crash with the other Mercedes of Valtteri Bottas, at the entrance to the fast Tamburello chicane; the race was red-flagged because debris had scattered across the track. Both drivers were noticeably enraged following the incident - Russell marched over to the remains of Bottas's Mercedes to confront him, while Bottas replied to a light slap on his crash helmet from Russell by giving him the middle finger. Because the stewards classified the incident as a racing incident, neither driver was penalised.

Just before the restart, Verstappen almost spun at Rivazza, but managed to maintain control; he kept the lead and pulled away for the rest of the race. Behind him, Lando Norris overtook the Ferrari of Charles Leclerc for second place, while Perez and Yuki Tsunoda spun at Villeneuve and Tamburello respectively, dropping them down to 14th and 15th. Hamilton, starting ninth after the red flag, worked his way upwards through the field, and eventually managed to pass the stubborn McLaren of Norris for second place on lap 60. Norris achieved his second podium with third-place, following an equal placing at Austria the previous year. Hamilton claimed the bonus point for fastest lap, allowing him to maintain the lead in the championship over Verstappen.

=== Post-race ===
Toto Wolff expressed displeasure with both Bottas and Russell following the race, but remarked he had expected Russell, a member of the Mercedes Junior Team, to be more circumspect while overtaking a Mercedes. Bottas had sustained a bruised knee in the 30 g (290 m/s^{2}; 970 ft/s^{2}) crash, and Wolff was also irritated that his car had been almost completely wrecked. The following day Russell expressed his desire to "clear the air" with Bottas following the confrontation, and later apologised to Bottas and to the Williams team. Lance Stroll was later given a five-second time penalty for cutting the Tamburello chicane, dropping him from seventh to eighth-position. Kimi Räikkönen was given a thirty-second penalty after he breached the restart rules, dropping him from ninth place to thirteenth. Räikkönen's team appealed the penalty, it was upheld following a review.

=== Race classification ===
Pos.	No.	Driver	Constructor	Laps	Time/Retired	Grid	Points
1	33	(Netherlands) Max Verstappen	Red Bull Racing-Honda	63	2:02:34.598	3	25
2	44	(United Kingdom) Lewis Hamilton	Mercedes	63	+22.000	1	19^{1}
3	4	(United Kingdom) Lando Norris	McLaren-Mercedes	63	+23.702	7	15
4	16	(Monaco) Charles Leclerc	Ferrari	63	+25.579	4	12
5	55	(Spain) Carlos Sainz Jr.	Ferrari	63	+27.036	11	10
6	3	(Australia) Daniel Ricciardo	McLaren-Mercedes	63	+51.220	6	8
7	10	(France) Pierre Gasly	AlphaTauri-Honda	63	+52.818	5	6
8	18	(Canada) Lance Stroll	Aston Martin-Mercedes	63	+56.909^{2}	10	4
9	31	(France) Esteban Ocon	Alpine-Renault	63	+1:05.704	9	2
10	14	(Spain) Fernando Alonso	Alpine-Renault	63	+1:06.561	15	1
11	11	(Mexico) Sergio Pérez	Red Bull Racing-Honda	63	+1:07.151	2	
12	22	(Japan) Yuki Tsunoda	AlphaTauri-Honda	63	+1:13.184^{3}	20	
13	7	(Finland) Kimi Räikkönen	Alfa Romeo Racing-Ferrari	63	+1:34.773^{4}	16	
14	99	(Italy) Antonio Giovinazzi	Alfa Romeo Racing-Ferrari	62	+1 lap	17	
15^{5}	5	(Germany) Sebastian Vettel	Aston Martin-Mercedes	61	Gearbox	PL^{5}	
16	47	(Germany) Mick Schumacher	Haas-Ferrari	61	+2 laps	18	
17	9	(Russian Automobile Federation) Nikita Mazepin	Haas-Ferrari	61	+2 laps	19	
Ret	77	(Finland) Valtteri Bottas	Mercedes	30	Collision	8	
Ret	63	(United Kingdom) George Russell	Williams-Mercedes	30	Collision	12	
Ret	6	(Canada) Nicholas Latifi	Williams-Mercedes	0	Collision	14	
Fastest lap: (United Kingdom) Lewis Hamilton (Mercedes) – 1:16.702 (lap 60)

==== Notes ====
- ^1 – Includes one point for fastest lap.
- ^2 – Lance Stroll finished 7th on the track, but received a post-race five-second time penalty for leaving the track and gaining an advantage while passing Pierre Gasly.
- ^3 – Yuki Tsunoda received a five-second time penalty for exceeding track limits.
- ^4 – Kimi Räikkönen finished 9th on the track, but received a post-race 30-second time penalty for a rolling start infringement.
- ^5 – Sebastian Vettel qualified 13th, but he started the race from the pit lane due to brakes issue occurred during the formation lap. He was classified as he completed more than 90% of the race distance.

== Championship standings after the race ==
Drivers' Championship standings

	Pos.	Driver	Points
	1	(United Kingdom) Lewis Hamilton	44
	2	(Netherlands) Max Verstappen	43
1	3	(United Kingdom) Lando Norris	27
2	4	(Monaco) Charles Leclerc	20
2	5	(Finland) Valtteri Bottas	16

Constructors' Championship standings

Pos.	Constructor	Points
1	(Germany) Mercedes	60
2	(Austria) Red Bull Racing-Honda	53
3	(United Kingdom) McLaren-Mercedes	41
4	(Italy) Ferrari	34
5	(Italy) AlphaTauri-Honda	8

- Note: Only the top five positions are included for both sets of standings.

== Notes ==
Previous race: 2021 Bahrain Grand Prix	FIA Formula One World Championship; 2021 season	Next race: 2021 Portuguese Grand Prix
Previous race: 2020 Emilia-Romagna Grand Prix	Emilia-Romagna Grand Prix	Next race: 2022 Emilia-Romagna Grand Prix
