= 2024 Emilia-Romagna Grand Prix =

Formula One motor race

Race 7 of 24 in the 2024 Formula One World Championship
← Previous race	Next race →
- Layout of the Autodromo Internazionale Enzo e Dino Ferrari

Race details
- Date: 19 May 2024
- Official name: Formula 1 MSC Cruises Gran Premio del Made in Italy e dell'Emilia-Romagna 2024
- Location: Autodromo Internazionale Enzo e Dino Ferrari; Imola, Emilia-Romagna, Italy
- Course: Permanent racing facility
- Course length: 4.909 km (3.050 mi)
- Distance: 63 laps, 309.049 km (192.034 mi)
- Weather: Partly cloudy
- Attendance: 200,000

Pole position
Driver	(Netherlands) Max Verstappen	Red Bull Racing-Honda RBPT
- Time: 1:14.746

Fastest lap
Driver	(United Kingdom) George Russell	Mercedes
- Time: 1:18.589 on lap 54

Podium
First	(Netherlands) Max Verstappen	Red Bull Racing-Honda RBPT
Second	(United Kingdom) Lando Norris	McLaren-Mercedes
Third	(Monaco) Charles Leclerc	Ferrari

The 2024 Emilia-Romagna Grand Prix (officially known as the Formula 1 MSC Cruises Gran Premio del Made in Italy e dell'Emilia-Romagna 2024) was a Formula One motor race held on 19 May 2024 at the Autodromo Internazionale Enzo e Dino Ferrari in Imola, Italy. It was the seventh round of the 2024 Formula One World Championship. Max Verstappen of Red Bull Racing took pole position and won the race over Lando Norris of McLaren and Charles Leclerc of Ferrari. Verstappen crossed the finish line 0.725 seconds ahead of Norris, who had closed the gap between them during the final laps of the race.

== Background ==
The event was held at the Autodromo Internazionale Enzo e Dino Ferrari in Imola for the 31st time in the circuit's history, having previously held one edition of the Italian Grand Prix and 26 editions of the San Marino Grand Prix, across the weekend of 17–19 May. The Grand Prix was the seventh round of the 2024 Formula One World Championship and the fourth running of the Emilia-Romagna Grand Prix. It was also the first edition of the event since 2022 after the 2023 Grand Prix was called off due to flooding in the region.

=== Championship standings before the race ===
Going into the weekend, Max Verstappen led the Drivers' Championship with 136 points, 33 points ahead of his teammate Sergio Pérez in second, and 38 ahead of Charles Leclerc in third. Red Bull Racing, with 239 points, led the Constructors' Championship from Ferrari and McLaren, who were second and third with 187 and 124 points, respectively.

=== Entrants ===
The drivers and teams were the same as the season entry list with no additional stand-in drivers for the race. Oliver Bearman drove in the first free practice session for Haas in place of Kevin Magnussen. This was the 300th entry and Grand Prix start for Mercedes as a Formula One constructor.

=== Tyre choices ===
Tyre supplier Pirelli brought the C3, C4, and C5 tyre compounds (the softest three in their range) designated hard, medium, and soft, respectively, for teams to use at the event. The tyre compounds selected are one set softer than the previous edition of the race.

== Practice ==
Three free practice sessions were held for the event. The first free practice session was held on 17 May 2024, at 13:30 local time (UTC+2), and was topped by Charles Leclerc of Ferrari, with George Russell of Mercedes and Leclerc's teammate Carlos Sainz Jr. behind him. A brief red flag was observed after the Williams of Alexander Albon ended his session on track due to mechanical failure. Red Bull Racing was fined €1,000 after Sergio Pérez breached the pit lane speed limit by 8.9 km/h (5.5 mph).

The second free practice session was held on the same day, at 17:00 local time, and was topped by Leclerc ahead of Oscar Piastri of McLaren and Yuki Tsunoda of RB. The third free practice session was held on 18 May 2024, at 12:30 local time, and was topped by Piastri ahead of his teammate Lando Norris and Sainz of Ferrari. Two red flags were observed after Fernando Alonso of Aston Martin and Pérez both collided with the wall. Pérez's crash in particular occurred during the closing minutes of the session, which disallowed further timed laps for most drivers. Aston Martin was fined €100 after Lance Stroll breached the pit lane speed limit by 0.1 km/h (0.062 mph).

== Qualifying ==
Qualifying was held on 18 May 2024, at 16:00 local time (UTC+2).

=== Qualifying report ===
Max Verstappen of Red Bull Racing set the fastest time and took his eighth consecutive pole position, the second driver to do so after Ayrton Senna at the 1989 United States Grand Prix. Oscar Piastri of McLaren joined him in the grid's front row with teammate Lando Norris behind him in third. After the session, Piastri was given a three-place grid penalty, moving him to fifth, for impeding the Haas of Kevin Magnussen during his flying lap in the first segment (Q1). As a result, Norris took his place for second with Charles Leclerc and Carlos Sainz Jr. of Ferrari behind in third and fourth respectively. Logan Sargeant of Williams had two lap times deleted due to track limits, leaving him last with a non-classified lap time.

=== Qualifying classification ===
Pos.	No.	Driver	Constructor	Qualifying times			Final grid
Pos.	No.	Driver	Constructor	Q1	Q2	Q3	Final grid
1	1	(Netherlands) Max Verstappen	Red Bull Racing-Honda RBPT	1:15.762	1:15.176	1:14.746	1
2	81	(Australia) Oscar Piastri	McLaren-Mercedes	1:15.940	1:15.407	1:14.820	5^{a}
3	4	(United Kingdom) Lando Norris	McLaren-Mercedes	1:15.915	1:15.371	1:14.837	2
4	16	(Monaco) Charles Leclerc	Ferrari	1:15.823	1:15.328	1:14.970	3
5	55	(Spain) Carlos Sainz Jr.	Ferrari	1:16.015	1:15.512	1:15.233	4
6	63	(United Kingdom) George Russell	Mercedes	1:16.107	1:15.671	1:15.234	6
7	22	(Japan) Yuki Tsunoda	RB-Honda RBPT	1:15.894	1:15.358	1:15.465	7
8	44	(United Kingdom) Lewis Hamilton	Mercedes	1:16.604	1:15.677	1:15.504	8
9	3	(Australia) Daniel Ricciardo	RB-Honda RBPT	1:16.060	1:15.691	1:15.674	9
10	27	(Germany) Nico Hülkenberg	Haas-Ferrari	1:15.841	1:15.569	1:15.980	10
11	11	(Mexico) Sergio Pérez	Red Bull Racing-Honda RBPT	1:16.404	1:15.706	N/A	11
12	31	(France) Esteban Ocon	Alpine-Renault	1:16.361	1:15.906	N/A	12
13	18	(Canada) Lance Stroll	Aston Martin Aramco-Mercedes	1:16.458	1:15.992	N/A	13
14	23	(Thailand) Alexander Albon	Williams-Mercedes	1:16.524	1:16.200	N/A	14
15	10	(France) Pierre Gasly	Alpine-Renault	1:16.015	1:16.381	N/A	15
16	77	(Finland) Valtteri Bottas	Kick Sauber-Ferrari	1:16.626	N/A	N/A	16
17	24	(China) Zhou Guanyu	Kick Sauber-Ferrari	1:16.834	N/A	N/A	17
18	20	(Denmark) Kevin Magnussen	Haas-Ferrari	1:16.854	N/A	N/A	18
19	14	(Spain) Fernando Alonso	Aston Martin Aramco-Mercedes	1:16.917	N/A	N/A	PL^{b}
107% time: 1:21.065
—	2	(United States) Logan Sargeant	Williams-Mercedes	No time	N/A	N/A	19^{c}

Notes

- ^a – Oscar Piastri received a three-place grid penalty for impeding Kevin Magnussen in Q1.
- ^b – Fernando Alonso qualified 19th, but was required to start the race from the pit lane as his car was modified during parc fermé conditions.
- ^c – Logan Sargeant failed to set a time during qualifying. He was permitted to race at the stewards' discretion.

== Race ==
The race was held on 19 May 2024, at 15:00 local time (UTC+2), and was run for 63 laps.

=== Race report ===
Before the race, one change to the grid was made: Fernando Alonso, in his lowest start for Aston Martin, started from the pit lane due to suspension changes that were made during parc fermé. He was originally due to start 19th of 20. Sargeant, who had not set a lap time within 107% rule time, was allowed to race at the stewards' discretion. The race began with Red Bull Racing polesitter Max Verstappen having a good start ahead of second-placed McLaren driver Lando Norris. Lewis Hamilton moved his Mercedes into seventh place while Sergio Pérez, who suffered his first Q2 elimination of the season the day before, overtook Daniel Ricciardo in the RB for tenth place. Verstappen proceeded to build a three-second gap to Norris by lap-ten, who was pressured from behind by the Ferrari drivers of Charles Leclerc and Carlos Sainz Jr.

On lap ten, Alexander Albon encountered an issue with his hard tyres. Williams fitted his tyre incorrectly during their pit stop, resulting in it being loose. He had to slow down on track to avoid the wheel becoming loose, and was given a ten-second penalty from the stewards for an unsafe release. Albon, who was now a lap down at this point, took the medium compounds for his next stop as other drivers came in. The RB of Yuki Tsunoda had been stuck behind Haas driver Nico Hülkenberg but would eventually undercut him after a quick stop. Meanwhile, with Piastri continuing to struggle against Sainz, Pérez ran wide into the gravel trap, making him lose time. Numerous drivers, including race leader Verstappen, took their stop by lap 21. Verstappen briefly conceded the lead to Sainz before he overtook the latter on lap 27. Pérez soon came under pressure from Hamilton, who was able to dispatch the Red Bull driver. Pérez had been utilising the hard tyres from his first stint, making a change on lap 38 to mediums and attacking Ricciardo, Hülkenberg and Tsunoda shortly after he exited the pit lane. Meanwhile, Magnussen was scrapping with the Alpine drivers and the Sauber of Zhou Guanyu while Norris and Leclerc were close to each other in a battle for second place.

With Norris having pulled away from Leclerc after the latter made a mistake, Verstappen's lead soon came under threat with Norris beginning to close the gap to the race leader. Meanwhile, Williams decided to retire Albon. By the time the chequered flag was flown, Norris finished in second place while Verstappen won the race by 0.725 seconds ahead of Norris, who closed the gap from six seconds in the final 15 laps. Leclerc completed the podium in third, and behind him was Piastri in fourth and Sainz in fifth. Meanwhile, Lance Stroll scored two points, with his team mate Alonso the last of the finishing cars in nineteenth. This was Alonso's lowest finish in his Formula One career. The seventh-placed George Russell took the fastest lap for Mercedes.

Following the race, Verstappen maintained his lead with 161 points, extending it to 48 points over Leclerc, who overtook Sergio Pérez for second in the championship, as the latter dropped down to third with 107 points, six behind Leclerc. Red Bull took their points total to 268 points, extending their advantage over Ferrari to 56 points.

=== Race classification ===
Pos.	No.	Driver	Constructor	Laps	Time/Retired	Grid	Points
1	1	(Netherlands) Max Verstappen	Red Bull Racing-Honda RBPT	63	1:25:25.252	1	25
2	4	(United Kingdom) Lando Norris	McLaren-Mercedes	63	+0.725	2	18
3	16	(Monaco) Charles Leclerc	Ferrari	63	+7.916	3	15
4	81	(Australia) Oscar Piastri	McLaren-Mercedes	63	+14.132	5	12
5	55	(Spain) Carlos Sainz Jr.	Ferrari	63	+22.325	4	10
6	44	(United Kingdom) Lewis Hamilton	Mercedes	63	+35.104	8	8
7	63	(United Kingdom) George Russell	Mercedes	63	+47.154	6	7^{a}
8	11	(Mexico) Sergio Pérez	Red Bull Racing-Honda RBPT	63	+54.776	11	4
9	18	(Canada) Lance Stroll	Aston Martin Aramco-Mercedes	63	+1:19.556	13	2
10	22	(Japan) Yuki Tsunoda	RB-Honda RBPT	62	+1 lap	7	1
11	27	(Germany) Nico Hülkenberg	Haas-Ferrari	62	+1 lap	10	
12	20	(Denmark) Kevin Magnussen	Haas-Ferrari	62	+1 lap	18	
13	3	(Australia) Daniel Ricciardo	RB-Honda RBPT	62	+1 lap	9	
14	31	(France) Esteban Ocon	Alpine-Renault	62	+1 lap	12	
15	24	(China) Zhou Guanyu	Kick Sauber-Ferrari	62	+1 lap	17	
16	10	(France) Pierre Gasly	Alpine-Renault	62	+1 lap	15	
17	2	(United States) Logan Sargeant	Williams-Mercedes	62	+1 lap	19	
18	77	(Finland) Valtteri Bottas	Kick Sauber-Ferrari	62	+1 lap	16	
19	14	(Spain) Fernando Alonso	Aston Martin Aramco-Mercedes	62	+1 lap	PL	
Ret	23	(Thailand) Alexander Albon	Williams-Mercedes	51	Withdrew	14	
Fastest lap: (United Kingdom) George Russell (Mercedes) – 1:18.589 (lap 54)

Notes

- ^a – Includes one point for fastest lap.

== Championship standings after the race ==
Drivers' Championship standings

	Pos.	Driver	Points
	1	(Netherlands) Max Verstappen	161
1	2	(Monaco) Charles Leclerc	113
1	3	(Mexico) Sergio Pérez	107
	4	(United Kingdom) Lando Norris	101
	5	(Spain) Carlos Sainz Jr.	93

Constructors' Championship standings

Pos.	Constructor	Points
1	(Austria) Red Bull Racing-Honda RBPT	268
2	(Italy) Ferrari	212
3	(United Kingdom) McLaren-Mercedes	154
4	(Germany) Mercedes	79
5	(United Kingdom) Aston Martin Aramco-Mercedes	44

- Note: Only the top five positions are included for both sets of standings.

== See also ==
- 2024 Imola Formula 2 round
- 2024 Imola Formula 3 round

Previous race: 2024 Miami Grand Prix	FIA Formula One World Championship; 2024 season	Next race: 2024 Monaco Grand Prix
Previous race: 2022 Emilia-Romagna Grand Prix; 2023 edition cancelled	Emilia-Romagna Grand Prix	Next race: 2025 Emilia-Romagna Grand Prix
