= 2022 Emilia-Romagna Grand Prix =

Fourth round of the 2022 Formula One season

Race 4 of 22 (Note: At the time of the event Formula One planned to hold twenty-three Grands Prix.) in the 2022 Formula One World Championship
← Previous race	Next race →
- Layout of the Autodromo Internazionale Enzo e Dino Ferrari

Race details
- Date: 24 April 2022
- Official name: Formula 1 Rolex Gran Premio del Made in Italy e dell'Emilia-Romagna 2022
- Location: Autodromo Internazionale Enzo e Dino Ferrari; Imola, Emilia-Romagna, Italy
- Course: Permanent racing facility
- Course length: 4.909 km (3.050 miles)
- Distance: 63 laps, 309.049 km (192.034 miles)
- Weather: Cloudy in a wet and drying track
- Attendance: 129,656

Pole position
Driver	(Netherlands) Max Verstappen (Note: Max Verstappen was credited with pole position after qualifying. He also started the race in the first position after winning the sprint.)	Red Bull Racing-RBPT
- Time: 1:27.999
- Grid positions set by results of sprint

Fastest lap
Driver	(Netherlands) Max Verstappen	Red Bull Racing-RBPT
- Time: 1:18.446 on lap 55

Podium
First	(Netherlands) Max Verstappen	Red Bull Racing-RBPT
Second	(Mexico) Sergio Pérez	Red Bull Racing-RBPT
Third	(United Kingdom) Lando Norris	McLaren-Mercedes

The 2022 Emilia-Romagna Grand Prix (officially known as the Formula 1 Rolex Gran Premio del Made in Italy e dell'Emilia-Romagna 2022) was a Formula One motor race held on 24 April 2022 at the Autodromo Internazionale Enzo e Dino Ferrari in Imola, Italy. It was the first Grand Prix weekend of the 2022 season to utilize the Formula One sprint racing format.

The race was won by Max Verstappen, ahead of his teammate Sergio Pérez and Lando Norris who finished third, his and McLaren's only podium of the season. It was Red Bull Racing's first 1–2 finish since the 2016 Malaysian Grand Prix, as well as Verstappen's second career grand slam, having started in pole position after winning the sprint race from first position on Saturday, and set the fastest lap while leading every lap of the race he won on Sunday. Championship leader Charles Leclerc finished sixth, while his teammate Carlos Sainz Jr. retired on lap 1 after a collision with Daniel Ricciardo at turn 1. This was the only race in the 2022 season where a driver outside one of the top three constructors achieved a podium.

== Background ==
=== Championship standings before the race ===
Charles Leclerc was the Drivers' Championship leader after the previous round in Australia with 71 points, 34 ahead of George Russell in second, with Carlos Sainz Jr. in third, four points behind Russell. In the Constructors' Championship, Ferrari led Mercedes by 39 points and Red Bull Racing by a further 10.

=== Entrants ===
The drivers and teams were the same as the season entry list with no additional stand-in drivers for the race.

=== Tyre choices ===
Tyre supplier Pirelli brought the C2, C3, and C4 tyre compounds (designated hard, medium, and soft, respectively) for teams to use at the event.

=== Track changes ===
The DRS detection point was moved further back, being positioned 385 metres (1,263 ft) before turn 17.

== Practice ==
There were two practice sessions, both lasting one hour. The first practice session started at 13:30 local time (UTC+02:00) on Friday, 22 April. The second practice session started at 12:30 local time on 23 April. The first practice session ended with Charles Leclerc quickest ahead of Carlos Sainz Jr. and Max Verstappen. The session was red flagged twice due to the wet conditions causing spins at turn twelve by Lando Norris and later Valtteri Bottas. In the second practice session, George Russell set the fastest lap ahead of Sergio Pérez and Leclerc.

== Qualifying ==
Qualifying took place at 17:00 local time and was scheduled to last one hour. Unlike the 2021 season, in which the qualifying for the Formula One sprint determined the grid for Saturday and the winner of the sprint would be considered as the pole-sitter for the Grand Prix, the 2022 rules state that the driver setting the fastest time on qualifying would be considered as the pole-sitter regardless of the sprint results.

=== Qualifying report ===
The first qualifying session was red flagged with 12 minutes left after Alexander Albon's brakes caught fire at turn 14 due to an incorrect switch setting, spewing debris all over the track. Only ten drivers had set times before the red flag, causing the track to become congested. The drivers eliminated were Albon, his Williams teammate Nicholas Latifi, the two AlphaTauri drivers, Yuki Tsunoda and Pierre Gasly, and Esteban Ocon in the Alpine. The second part of qualifying was red flagged after Carlos Sainz Jr. spun at turn 18 and collided with the outside barrier; although his time was fast enough for him to advance to the third part of qualifying, he was not able to participate in the session due to his crash, leaving him tenth. Those eliminated were Lance Stroll, Zhou Guanyu, Mick Schumacher, and notably George Russell and Lewis Hamilton, the two Mercedes drivers, the first time since the 2012 Japanese Grand Prix that a Mercedes car did not make the final part of qualifying.

In Q3, there were three more red flags, bringing the total in qualifying to five, a new record. First was Kevin Magnussen spinning at turn 12, one of many drivers having issues at that part of the track. The second red flag in the session was called when Valtteri Bottas's Alfa Romeo had an issue causing him to pull off the side of the track at turn 16, with only three minutes left in the session. Max Verstappen, who was on pace to set the fastest lap, had to slow down due to the yellow flags and was still able to complete the lap and beat Charles Leclerc's time by 0.7 seconds; the red flag was deployed before Leclerc was able to complete his lap. Drivers were again in a frenzy to get one more chance to improve their lap time; however, with less than a minute to go, Lando Norris spun at turn 12. This caused the session to end prematurely, leaving the drivers with no more chance to improve their lap times. Verstappen had set the fastest lap ahead Leclerc, the championship leader, who qualified in second. McLaren's Norris was third and Magnussen, driving for Haas, a team that did not qualify higher than 14th in 2021, was fourth, which was the team's best qualifying in its history. Verstappen's teammate Sergio Pérez managed seventh behind Fernando Alonso and Daniel Ricciardo, with Bottas, Sebastian Vettel, and Sainz occupying the rest of the top ten.

=== Qualifying classification ===
Pos.	No.	Driver	Constructor	Qualifying times			Sprint grid
Pos.	No.	Driver	Constructor	Q1	Q2	Q3	Sprint grid
1	1	(Netherlands) Max Verstappen	Red Bull Racing-RBPT	1:19.295	1:18.793	1:27.999	1
2	16	(Monaco) Charles Leclerc	Ferrari	1:18.796	1:19.584	1:28.778	2
3	4	(United Kingdom) Lando Norris	McLaren-Mercedes	1:20.168	1:19.294	1:29.131	3
4	20	(Denmark) Kevin Magnussen	Haas-Ferrari	1:20.147	1:19.902	1:29.164	4
5	14	(Spain) Fernando Alonso	Alpine-Renault	1:20.198	1:19.595	1:29.202	5
6	3	(Australia) Daniel Ricciardo	McLaren-Mercedes	1:19.980	1:20.031	1:29.742	6
7	11	(Mexico) Sergio Pérez	Red Bull Racing-RBPT	1:19.773	1:19.296	1:29.808	7
8	77	(Finland) Valtteri Bottas	Alfa Romeo-Ferrari	1:20.419	1:20.192	1:30.439	8
9	5	(Germany) Sebastian Vettel	Aston Martin Aramco-Mercedes	1:20.364	1:19.957	1:31.062	9
10	55	(Spain) Carlos Sainz Jr.	Ferrari	1:19.305	1:18.990	No time	10
11	63	(United Kingdom) George Russell	Mercedes	1:20.383	1:20.757	N/A	11
12	47	(Germany) Mick Schumacher	Haas-Ferrari	1:20.422	1:20.916	N/A	12
13	44	(United Kingdom) Lewis Hamilton	Mercedes	1:20.470	1:21.138	N/A	13
14	24	(China) Zhou Guanyu	Alfa Romeo-Ferrari	1:19.730	1:21.434	N/A	14
15	18	(Canada) Lance Stroll	Aston Martin Aramco-Mercedes	1:20.342	1:28.119	N/A	15
16	22	(Japan) Yuki Tsunoda	AlphaTauri-RBPT	1:20.474	N/A	N/A	16
17	10	(France) Pierre Gasly	AlphaTauri-RBPT	1:20.732	N/A	N/A	17
18	6	(Canada) Nicholas Latifi	Williams-Mercedes	1:21.971	N/A	N/A	18
19	31	(France) Esteban Ocon	Alpine-Renault	1:22.338	N/A	N/A	19
107% time: 1:24.311
—	23	(Thailand) Alexander Albon	Williams-Mercedes	No time	N/A	N/A	20^{1}

Notes

- ^1 – Alexander Albon failed to set a time during qualifying, but he was permitted to race in the sprint at the stewards' discretion.

== Sprint ==
The sprint started at 16:30 local time on 23 April and lasted for 21 laps. Unlike the 2021 season, in which only the first three placed drivers in the sprint received points, the 2022 rules expanded points to the first eight drivers. It continued to determine the grid for the race on Sunday.

=== Sprint report ===
Max Verstappen had a bad start and Charles Leclerc took the lead, while Pierre Gasly hit Zhou Guanyu at turn 9, causing a puncture for Gasly, and Zhou's retirement, which brought out the safety car. In the first laps, Leclerc pushed hard to keep Verstappen out of DRS range but started to suffer from graining. On lap 19, Verstappen was able to pass him into turn 1 with the DRS to win the sprint, ahead of Leclerc. Sergio Pérez recovered to third, while Carlos Sainz Jr. came back to fourth. With the results, Sainz returned to second in the standings, while Verstappen rose from 6th to 5th, as both Mercedes drivers George Russell and Lewis Hamilton finished outside the points.

=== Sprint classification ===
Pos.	No.	Driver	Constructor	Laps	Time/Retired	Grid	Points	Final grid
1	1	(Netherlands) Max Verstappen	Red Bull Racing-RBPT	21	30:39.567	1	8	1
2	16	(Monaco) Charles Leclerc	Ferrari	21	+2.975	2	7	2
3	11	(Mexico) Sergio Pérez	Red Bull Racing-RBPT	21	+4.721	7	6	3
4	55	(Spain) Carlos Sainz Jr.	Ferrari	21	+17.578	10	5	4
5	4	(United Kingdom) Lando Norris	McLaren-Mercedes	21	+24.561	3	4	5
6	3	(Australia) Daniel Ricciardo	McLaren-Mercedes	21	+27.740	6	3	6
7	77	(Finland) Valtteri Bottas	Alfa Romeo-Ferrari	21	+28.133	8	2	7
8	20	(Denmark) Kevin Magnussen	Haas-Ferrari	21	+30.712	4	1	8
9	14	(Spain) Fernando Alonso	Alpine-Renault	21	+32.278	5		9
10	47	(Germany) Mick Schumacher	Haas-Ferrari	21	+33.773	12		10
11	63	(United Kingdom) George Russell	Mercedes	21	+36.284	11		11
12	22	(Japan) Yuki Tsunoda	AlphaTauri-RBPT	21	+38.298	16		12
13	5	(Germany) Sebastian Vettel	Aston Martin Aramco-Mercedes	21	+40.177	9		13
14	44	(United Kingdom) Lewis Hamilton	Mercedes	21	+41.459	13		14
15	18	(Canada) Lance Stroll	Aston Martin Aramco-Mercedes	21	+42.910	15		15
16	31	(France) Esteban Ocon	Alpine-Renault	21	+43.517	19		16
17	10	(France) Pierre Gasly	AlphaTauri-RBPT	21	+43.794	17		17
18	23	(Thailand) Alexander Albon	Williams-Mercedes	21	+48.871	20		18
19	6	(Canada) Nicholas Latifi	Williams-Mercedes	21	+52.017	18		19
Ret	24	(China) Zhou Guanyu	Alfa Romeo-Ferrari	0	Collision	14		PL^{a}
Fastest lap: (Mexico) Sergio Pérez (Red Bull Racing-RBPT) – 1:19.012 (lap 14)

Notes

- ^a – Zhou Guanyu was required to start the race from the pit lane as his car was modified under parc fermé conditions due to a collision with Pierre Gasly.

== Race ==
The race started at 15:00 local time on 24 April and lasted 63 laps. It was won by Max Verstappen ahead of teammate Sergio Pérez in second and Lando Norris in third. On home soil, Ferrari drivers Charles Leclerc and Carlos Sainz Jr. suffered, as the former made a mistake late in the race that cost him a podium, while the latter had a DNF on lap 1.

=== Race report ===
With rain falling in the circuit in the preceding hours and the track being wet, all cars on the grid started on intermediate tyres. Those starting on the right side of the grid, such as championship leader Charles Leclerc in second and his teammate Carlos Sainz Jr. in fourth, had a bad start due to a bitumen asphalt strip, which was added to cover the old starting line but had become more slippery when it rained. Going into turn 1, Leclerc lost positions to Sergio Pérez and Lando Norris, while Sainz was overtaken by Norris at the start and was hit by Daniel Ricciardo. The collision, which was not investigated, left Sainz struck in the gravel, while Ricciardo was able to get back on track and make a pit stop at the end of the lap. After the Sainz–Ricciardo collision, Mick Schumacher had a half-spin and dropped from 10th to 17th, as his rear-axle slid tagged the sidepod of Fernando Alonso, who had to retire on lap 8 after his bodywork failed. Russell, Sebastian Vettel, and Lance Stroll had a good start, with Russell sixth, Vettel ninth, and Stroll eleventh. The safety car brought out by the Sainz–Ricciardo collision was withdrawn on lap 4.

With Leclerc stuck behind Norris, the two Red Bull cars of Max Verstappen and Pérez built a lead, as Verstappen turned down a suggestion from his team to put on dry tyres and he continued racing, as did the rest of the field, despite reports of the track drying. On lap 8, Leclerc overtook Norris into turn 1, but by then he had a 6.2 and 3.3 seconds deficit to Verstappen and Pérez, respectively. In the next seven laps, those gaps remained stable, as Verstappen was 5.5 seconds ahead of Pérez, with Leclerc at 1.9 seconds behind. Verstappen told his team he was ready to switch to slick tyres in case a safety car was brought out but remained on track. Ricciardo went into the pits on lap 18 to switch to dry, medium compound tyres, which led the rest of the field to follow suit over the next few laps. On lap 19, both Pérez and Russell, the latter now running fourth after overtaking Kevin Magnussen on lap 12, pitted, which was a lap earlier than Verstappen and Leclerc, the latter of whom had a successful overcut to come in front of Pérez for second; however, due to Leclerc's colder tyres, Pérez was able to take the position back a few turns later, as Verstappen expanded his lead to 7.5 seconds.

Leclerc remained close behind Pérez, who went over the grass at the chicane at turns 14–15 on lap 28, and Leclerc closed the gap to less than one second but was not able to make the overtake. When the DRS was activated on lap 35, after being off until then because of wet-weather conditions, despite all drivers being on dry tyres, Leclerc was over one second behind Pérez, while Pierre Gasly was able to get into DRS zone behind Alexander Albon, as Lewis Hamilton remained stuck behind the two drivers for the rest of the race, being lapped by Verstappen on lap 40. Verstappen extended his lead on Pérez and Leclerc. On lap 50, Leclerc went into the pits for soft compounds and came out in fourth position, behind Norris. Leclerc overtook Norris with the help of DRS by lap 51, as both Red Bull cars responded to Leclerc's undercut attempt and pitted on lap 51 (Pérez) and 52 (Verstappen), respectively. With the move, Leclerc closed the gap to Pérez and had a seven-tenth gap on lap 53. In an attempt to push and get closer to Pérez for an overtake, Leclerc clattered the kerbs at the turns 14–15 chicane and spun to the outside wall on lap 54. He broke an endplate but avoided suspension damage, and was able to restart and get a new front wing and soft compounds at the pits. He fell back to ninth and recovered to sixth by the end of the race.

Verstappen won ahead of Pérez, Norris, Russell, whose front-wing aerodynamic balance was not adjusted at his pit stop, and Valtteri Bottas, with Leclerc, Yuki Tsunoda, Vettel, Magnussen, and Stroll to complete the top 10. Albon, Gasly, and Hamilton finished 11th, 12th, and 13th, respectively, after Esteban Ocon received a five-second penalty and was demoted to 14th for an unsafe release in the pits, which forced Hamilton to lift off in the pit lane and drop a place, ahead of Zhou Guanyu, Nicholas Latifi, and Schumacher, who spun for a second time in the race, while Ricciardo, who was the only driver to make a second pit stop for a set of hard compounds and suffered a damaged diffusor from the collision with Sainz, finished last. Having led every lap whilst also having set the fastest lap and winning the race, Verstappen achieved his second career grand slam, while Red Bull had their first 1–2 finish since the 2016 Malaysian Grand Prix. In the Drivers' Championship, Sainz fell to fifth, while both Verstappen and Red Bull made a comeback to second place in the Drivers' and Constructors' championships, respectively. Leclerc saw his leading advantage in the standings reduced from 45 to 27 points.

By virtue of Bottas's fifth place finish in this event, Alfa Romeo were able to secure sixth place in the Constructor's Championship, having finished level on points at the end of the season with Aston Martin but finishing ahead on countback.

=== Race classification ===
Pos.	No.	Driver	Constructor	Laps	Time/Retired	Grid	Points
1	1	(Netherlands) Max Verstappen	Red Bull Racing-RBPT	63	1:32:07.986	1	26^{a}
2	11	(Mexico) Sergio Pérez	Red Bull Racing-RBPT	63	+16.527	3	18
3	4	(United Kingdom) Lando Norris	McLaren-Mercedes	63	+34.834	5	15
4	63	(United Kingdom) George Russell	Mercedes	63	+42.506	11	12
5	77	(Finland) Valtteri Bottas	Alfa Romeo-Ferrari	63	+43.181	7	10
6	16	(Monaco) Charles Leclerc	Ferrari	63	+56.072	2	8
7	22	(Japan) Yuki Tsunoda	AlphaTauri-RBPT	63	+1:01.110	12	6
8	5	(Germany) Sebastian Vettel	Aston Martin Aramco-Mercedes	63	+1:10.892	13	4
9	20	(Denmark) Kevin Magnussen	Haas-Ferrari	63	+1:15.260	8	2
10	18	(Canada) Lance Stroll	Aston Martin Aramco-Mercedes	62	+1 lap	15	1
11	23	(Thailand) Alexander Albon	Williams-Mercedes	62	+1 lap	18	
12	10	(France) Pierre Gasly	AlphaTauri-RBPT	62	+1 lap	17	
13	44	(United Kingdom) Lewis Hamilton	Mercedes	62	+1 lap	14	
14	31	(France) Esteban Ocon	Alpine-Renault	62	+1 lap^{b}	16	
15	24	(China) Zhou Guanyu	Alfa Romeo-Ferrari	62	+1 lap	PL	
16	6	(Canada) Nicholas Latifi	Williams-Mercedes	62	+1 lap	19	
17	47	(Germany) Mick Schumacher	Haas-Ferrari	62	+1 lap	10	
18	3	(Australia) Daniel Ricciardo	McLaren-Mercedes	62	+1 lap	6	
Ret	14	(Spain) Fernando Alonso	Alpine-Renault	6	Collision damage	9	
Ret	55	(Spain) Carlos Sainz Jr.	Ferrari	0	Collision	4	
Fastest lap: (Netherlands) Max Verstappen (Red Bull Racing-RBPT) – 1:18.446 (lap 55)

Notes

- ^a – Includes one point for fastest lap.
- ^b – Esteban Ocon finished 11th, but he received a five-second time penalty for an unsafe release.

== Championship standings after the race ==
Drivers' Championship standings

	Pos.	Driver	Points
	1	(Monaco) Charles Leclerc	86
4	2	(Netherlands) Max Verstappen	59
1	3	(Mexico) Sergio Pérez	54
2	4	(United Kingdom) George Russell	49
2	5	(Spain) Carlos Sainz Jr.	38

Constructors' Championship standings

	Pos.	Constructor	Points
	1	(Italy) Ferrari	124
1	2	(Austria) Red Bull Racing-RBPT	113
1	3	(Germany) Mercedes	77
	4	(United Kingdom) McLaren-Mercedes	46
1	5	(Switzerland) Alfa Romeo-Ferrari	25

- Note: Only the top five positions are included for both sets of standings.

== See also ==
- 2022 Imola Formula 2 round
- 2022 Imola Formula 3 round

== Notes ==
Previous race: 2022 Australian Grand Prix	FIA Formula One World Championship; 2022 season	Next race: 2022 Miami Grand Prix
Previous race: 2021 Emilia-Romagna Grand Prix	Emilia-Romagna Grand Prix	Next race: 2024 Emilia-Romagna Grand Prix; 2023 edition cancelled
