= 2023 Emilia-Romagna Grand Prix =

Cancelled Formula One motor race

- Layout of the Autodromo Internazionale Enzo e Dino Ferrari

Race details
- Date: Planned for 21 May 2023
- Official name: Formula 1 Qatar Airways Gran Premio del Made in Italy e dell'Emilia-Romagna 2023
- Location: Autodromo Internazionale Enzo e Dino Ferrari; Imola, Emilia-Romagna, Italy
- Course: Permanent racing facility
- Course length: 4.909 km (3.050 miles)
- Scheduled distance: 63 laps, 309.049 km (192.034 miles)

The 2023 Emilia-Romagna Grand Prix (officially known as the Formula 1 Qatar Airways Gran Premio del Made in Italy e dell'Emilia-Romagna 2023) was a scheduled Formula One motor race set to be held on 21 May 2023, at the Autodromo Internazionale Enzo e Dino Ferrari in Imola, Italy. On 17 May, Formula One Management announced the cancellation of the race due to sudden floods in the region.

== Background ==
The event was set to be held across the weekend of 19–21 May. It would have been the sixth round of the 2023 Formula One World Championship.

=== Qualifying format and tyre rule changes ===
The Grand Prix was set to be the first of two to trial a new qualifying format that mandates specific tyre compounds. During the first segment (Q1), drivers would have used the hard compound, mediums during the second (Q2), and softs during the third (Q3). In addition, teams would have only had 11 sets of tyres for the race weekend rather than 13 as part of an initiative to help the sport become more environmentally friendly.

=== Championship standings before the race ===
Max Verstappen led the Drivers' Championship with 119 points, 14 points ahead of his teammate Sergio Pérez in second, and 44 ahead of Fernando Alonso in third. Red Bull Racing, with 224 points, led the Constructors' Championship from Aston Martin and Mercedes, who were second and third with 102 and 96 points, respectively.

As the race was cancelled, these standings would carry over to the following Monaco Grand Prix.

=== Tyre choices ===
Tyre supplier Pirelli had brought the C3, C4, and C5 tyre compounds (designated hard, medium, and soft, respectively) for teams to use at the event.

== Rain, floods and subsequent cancellation ==
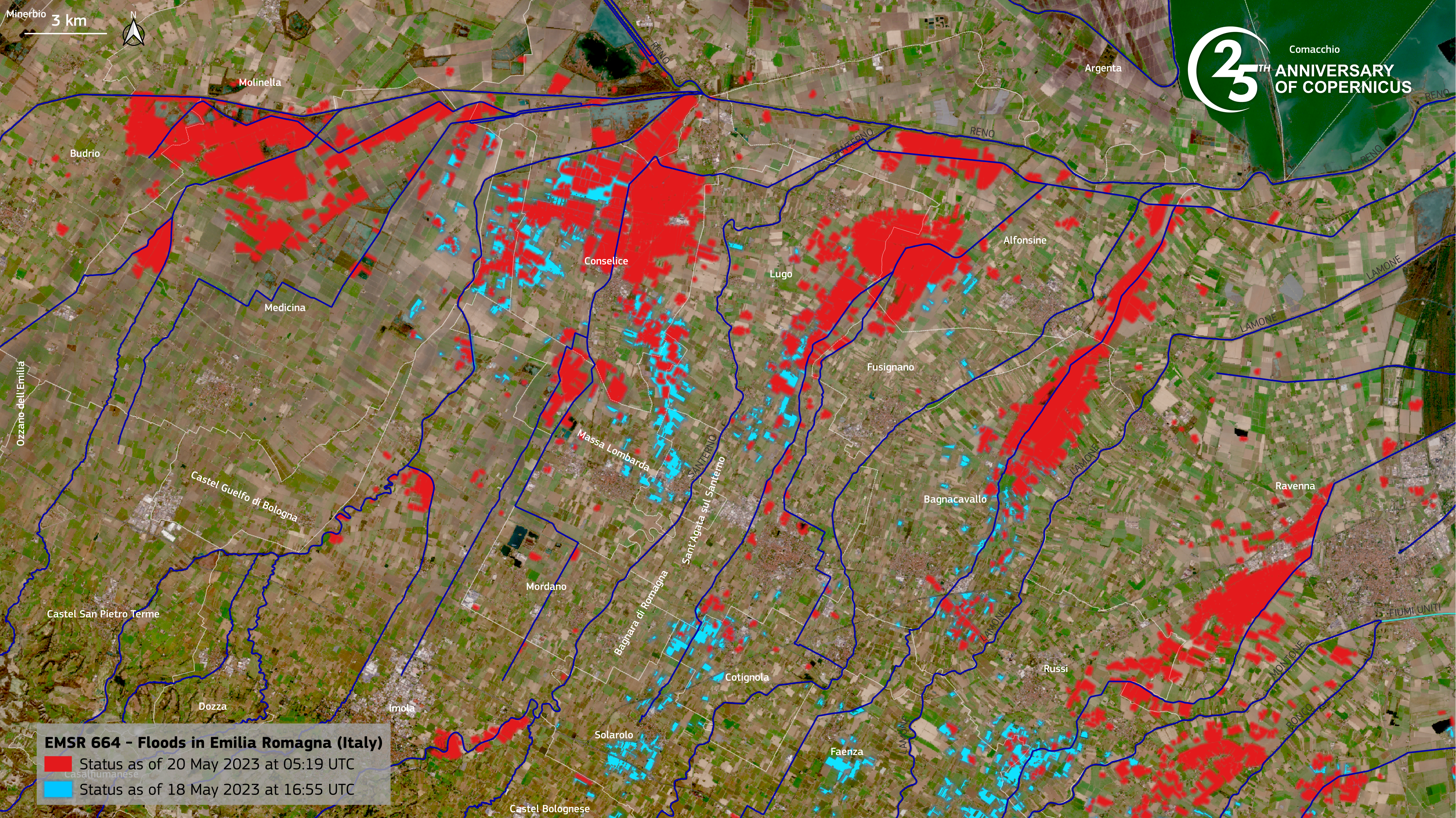
The floods in Emilia-Romagna on 20 May, the scheduled qualifying day; Imola Circuit is obscured by the right side of the key

Heading into the weekend, the Italian Protezione Civile issued a weather red alert for the Emilia-Romagna region, where the race would be held; the region had been affected by heavy rain, which led to floods and landslides. On 16 May, all Formula One personnel were instructed to leave the paddock, citing precautionary steps after a rise in water level at the nearby Santerno river was reported. Due to the heavy rain observed throughout the week before the race and after several rumours the day before, the Italian ministry called for the race to be postponed. Parts of the Grand Prix venue, including the Formula 2 paddock, were later seen to be flooded after the announcement of the cancellation.

Ultimately, the Grand Prix, as well as Formula 2 and Formula 3 support races, would not go ahead as scheduled; an official statement from Formula One stated that the decision was made as it was not possible to hold the event while considering the safety of the fans, teams, and other personnel, and to lighten the load on local emergency services as they had already been pressured due to the storm damage. While the announcement did not rule out the possibility of holding the event later in the year, this was considered unlikely to occur due to a lack of logistically viable calendar slots.

Formula One donated €1 million to the Emilia-Romagna region's Agency for Territorial Safety and Civil Protection, and Ferrari announced a further €1 million donation to the region's fundraising effort after the floods.

== See also ==
- 2020 Australian Grand Prix, the last Grand Prix cancelled the same week the event was scheduled to take place

Previous race: N/A	FIA Formula One World Championship; 2023 season	Next race: N/A
Previous race: 2022 Emilia-Romagna Grand Prix	Emilia-Romagna Grand Prix	Next race: 2024 Emilia-Romagna Grand Prix
