= 2020 Emilia-Romagna Grand Prix =

Formula One race in Italy

Race 13 of 17 (Note: The outbreak of the COVID-19 pandemic saw several Grands Prix cancelled or rescheduled. The revised calendar consisted of seventeen races.) in the 2020 Formula One World Championship
← Previous race	Next race →
- Layout of the Autodromo Enzo e Dino Ferrari

Race details
- Date: 1 November 2020
- Official name: Formula 1 Emirates Gran Premio dell'Emilia Romagna 2020
- Location: Autodromo Internazionale Enzo e Dino Ferrari; Imola, Emilia-Romagna, Italy
- Course: Permanent racing facility
- Course length: 4.909 km (3.050 miles)
- Distance: 63 laps, 309.049 km (192.034 miles)
- Weather: Partly cloudy
- Attendance: 0 (Note: The Grand Prix was held behind closed doors due to the COVID-19 pandemic in Italy.)

Pole position
Driver	(Finland) Valtteri Bottas	Mercedes
- Time: 1:13.609

Fastest lap
Driver	(United Kingdom) Lewis Hamilton	Mercedes
- Time: 1:15.484 on lap 63 (lap record)

Podium
First	(United Kingdom) Lewis Hamilton	Mercedes
Second	(Finland) Valtteri Bottas	Mercedes
Third	(Australia) Daniel Ricciardo	Renault

The 2020 Emilia-Romagna Grand Prix (officially known as the Formula 1 Emirates Gran Premio dell'Emilia Romagna 2020) was a Formula One motor race which took place on 1 November 2020 at the Autodromo Internazionale Enzo e Dino Ferrari in Imola, Italy. It was the 28th Formula One race held at the Imola circuit, the first since 2006 and the first-ever running of a race there under the name of Emilia-Romagna Grand Prix. The race was the 13th round of the 2020 Formula One World Championship.

The 63-lap race was won by Mercedes driver Lewis Hamilton, with his teammate Valtteri Bottas taking second place, and Renault driver Daniel Ricciardo taking the final podium place. With their drivers finishing first and second in the race, Mercedes secured the World Constructors' Championship, breaking the record for the most consecutive World Constructors' Championships, with seven.

== Background ==
This was the 28th running of a Formula One event at Imola, the first time since the 2006 San Marino Grand Prix. Kimi Räikkönen was the only driver entered who had previously raced at the track in Formula One, having done so from the 2001 to the 2006 edition of the San Marino Grand Prix. The race weekend was held over two days rather than the traditional three days, hosting only one practice session of 90 minutes on Saturday morning before qualifying.

=== Impact of the COVID-19 pandemic ===
The 2020 Formula One World Championship was heavily affected by the COVID-19 pandemic. Most of the originally planned Grands Prix were cancelled or postponed, prompting the FIA to draft a new calendar. The Emilia-Romagna Grand Prix was not originally featured on the 2020 schedule, but was added in July 2020 in order to maximise the number of races in the season. Initially, 13,000 fans were expected to attend the race. However, due to a surge of cases attributed to the COVID-19 pandemic in the country, organisers announced that the Grand Prix would take place behind closed doors.

=== Entrants ===
Ten teams (each representing a different constructor) each entered two drivers. The drivers and teams were the same as those on the season entry list with no additional stand-in drivers for either the race or practice.

=== Tyres ===
Sole Formula One tyre manufacturer Pirelli brought their C2, C3 and C4 compound tyres for teams to use in the race, the middle range of the five compounds available in terms of hardness.

== Practice ==
Lewis Hamilton finished the only practice session fastest ahead of Red Bull's Max Verstappen and the other Mercedes of Valtteri Bottas.

== Qualifying ==
Valtteri Bottas took pole by 0.097s ahead of his teammate Lewis Hamilton. Pierre Gasly's 4th place was Scuderia AlphaTauri's best qualifying result as a constructor and the best qualifying result for the team since the 2008 Italian Grand Prix when they competed as Scuderia Toro Rosso.

=== Qualifying classification ===
Pos.	No.	Driver	Constructor	Qualifying times			Final grid
Pos.	No.	Driver	Constructor	Q1	Q2	Q3	Final grid
1	77	(Finland) Valtteri Bottas	Mercedes	1:14.221	1:14.585	1:13.609	1
2	44	(United Kingdom) Lewis Hamilton	Mercedes	1:14.229	1:14.643	1:13.706	2
3	33	(Netherlands) Max Verstappen	Red Bull Racing-Honda	1:15.034	1:14.974	1:14.176	3
4	10	(France) Pierre Gasly	AlphaTauri-Honda	1:15.183	1:14.681	1:14.502	4
5	3	(Australia) Daniel Ricciardo	Renault	1:15.474	1:14.953	1:14.520	5
6	23	(Thailand) Alexander Albon	Red Bull Racing-Honda	1:15.402	1:14.745	1:14.572	6
7	16	(Monaco) Charles Leclerc	Ferrari	1:15.123	1:15.017	1:14.616	7
8	26	(Russia) Daniil Kvyat	AlphaTauri-Honda	1:15.412	1:15.022	1:14.696	8
9	4	(United Kingdom) Lando Norris	McLaren-Renault	1:15.274	1:15.051	1:14.814	9
10	55	(Spain) Carlos Sainz Jr.	McLaren-Renault	1:15.528	1:15.027	1:14.911	10
11	11	(Mexico) Sergio Pérez	Racing Point-BWT Mercedes	1:15.407	1:15.061	N/A	11
12	31	(France) Esteban Ocon	Renault	1:15.352	1:15.201	N/A	12
13	63	(United Kingdom) George Russell	Williams-Mercedes	1:15.760	1:15.323	N/A	13
14	5	(Germany) Sebastian Vettel	Ferrari	1:15.571	1:15.385	N/A	14
15	18	(Canada) Lance Stroll	Racing Point-BWT Mercedes	1:15.822	1:15.494	N/A	15
16	8	(France) Romain Grosjean	Haas-Ferrari	1:15.918	N/A	N/A	16
17	20	(Denmark) Kevin Magnussen	Haas-Ferrari	1:15.939	N/A	N/A	17
18	7	(Finland) Kimi Räikkönen	Alfa Romeo Racing-Ferrari	1:15.953	N/A	N/A	18
19	6	(Canada) Nicholas Latifi	Williams-Mercedes	1:15.987	N/A	N/A	19
20	99	(Italy) Antonio Giovinazzi	Alfa Romeo Racing-Ferrari	1:16.208	N/A	N/A	20
107% time: 1:19.416

== Race ==
Valtteri Bottas initially led from pole while Max Verstappen passed Lewis Hamilton to move up from 3rd into 2nd at the start. On the second lap Bottas hit some debris on the track which damaged his car, slowing his progress for the remainder of the race. Daniel Ricciardo overtook Pierre Gasly at the start to move up into fourth place, only for Gasly to retire from the race in the early stages with a coolant leak.

Bottas and Verstappen pitted for new tyres earlier in the race. Hamilton pitted during a virtual safety car meaning the pitstop cost him less time than his rivals, allowing him to lead the race after the first round of pitstops. Verstappen eventually passed Bottas, only for a tyre failure to cause his car to leave the track and get beached in the gravel trap at the Villeneuve chicane. This brought out a safety car and bunched up the field for the final few laps of the race.

During the safety car period George Russell, who had been running in 10th, spun and crashed his Williams car into a wall between Piratella and Acque Minerali whilst trying to warm his tyres. After the safety car restart Daniil Kvyat moved up several positions into fourth place whilst Alex Albon spun from fifth and dropped to the back. Ricciardo inherited third place behind the two Mercedes drivers after Sergio Pérez pitted for new tyres behind the safety car.

=== Race classification ===
Pos.	No.	Driver	Constructor	Laps	Time/Retired	Grid	Points
1	44	(United Kingdom) Lewis Hamilton	Mercedes	63	1:28:32.430	2	26^{1}
2	77	(Finland) Valtteri Bottas	Mercedes	63	+5.783	1	18
3	3	(Australia) Daniel Ricciardo	Renault	63	+14.320	5	15
4	26	(Russia) Daniil Kvyat	AlphaTauri-Honda	63	+15.141	8	12
5	16	(Monaco) Charles Leclerc	Ferrari	63	+19.111	7	10
6	11	(Mexico) Sergio Pérez	Racing Point-BWT Mercedes	63	+19.652	11	8
7	55	(Spain) Carlos Sainz Jr.	McLaren-Renault	63	+20.230	10	6
8	4	(United Kingdom) Lando Norris	McLaren-Renault	63	+21.131	9	4
9	7	(Finland) Kimi Räikkönen	Alfa Romeo Racing-Ferrari	63	+22.224	18	2
10	99	(Italy) Antonio Giovinazzi	Alfa Romeo Racing-Ferrari	63	+26.398	20	1
11	6	(Canada) Nicholas Latifi	Williams-Mercedes	63	+27.135	19	
12	5	(Germany) Sebastian Vettel	Ferrari	63	+28.453	14	
13	18	(Canada) Lance Stroll	Racing Point-BWT Mercedes	63	+29.163	15	
14	8	(France) Romain Grosjean	Haas-Ferrari	63	+32.935^{2}	16	
15	23	(Thailand) Alexander Albon	Red Bull Racing-Honda	63	+57.284	6	
Ret	63	(United Kingdom) George Russell	Williams-Mercedes	51	Accident	13	
Ret	33	(Netherlands) Max Verstappen	Red Bull Racing-Honda	50	Puncture/Spun off	3	
Ret	20	(Denmark) Kevin Magnussen	Haas-Ferrari	47	Gearbox/Illness	17	
Ret	31	(France) Esteban Ocon	Renault	27	Gearbox	12	
Ret	10	(France) Pierre Gasly	AlphaTauri-Honda	8	Coolant leak	4	
Fastest lap: (United Kingdom) Lewis Hamilton (Mercedes) – 1:15.484 (lap 63)

Notes

- ^1 – Includes one point for fastest lap.
- ^2 – Romain Grosjean finished 12th on the track, but received a five-second time penalty for exceeding track limits.

== Championship standings after the race ==
Drivers' Championship standings

Pos.	Driver	Points
1	(United Kingdom) **Lewis Hamilton***	282
2	(Finland) **Valtteri Bottas***	197
3	(Netherlands) Max Verstappen	162
4	(Australia) Daniel Ricciardo	95
5	(Monaco) Charles Leclerc	85

Constructors' Championship standings

	Pos.	Constructor	Points
	1	(Germany) **Mercedes**	479
	2	(Austria) Red Bull Racing-Honda	226
2	3	(France) Renault	135
	4	(United Kingdom) McLaren-Renault	134
2	5	(United Kingdom) Racing Point-BWT Mercedes	134 (Note: Racing Point was deducted 15 points after a protest from Renault was upheld regarding the legality of their car.)

- Note: Only the top five positions are included for both sets of standings.
- Competitors in bold are the 2020 World Constructors' Champions.
- Competitors in bold and marked with an asterisk still had a mathematical chance of winning the Championship.

== Notes ==
Previous race: 2020 Portuguese Grand Prix	FIA Formula One World Championship; 2020 season	Next race: 2020 Turkish Grand Prix
Previous race: None; Previous race at the Imola Circuit: 2006 San Marino Grand Prix	Emilia-Romagna Grand Prix	Next race: 2021 Emilia-Romagna Grand Prix
