= 2006 San Marino Grand Prix =

Coordinates: 44°20′38″N 11°43′00″E

Race 4 of 18 in the 2006 Formula One World Championship
← Previous race	Next race →
- Autodromo Enzo e Dino Ferrari

Race details
- Date: 23 April 2006
- Official name: Formula 1 Gran Premio Foster's di San Marino 2006
- Location: Autodromo Enzo e Dino Ferrari; Imola, Emilia-Romagna, Italy
- Course: Permanent racing facility
- Course length: 4.933 km (3.065 miles)
- Distance: 62 laps, 305.609 km (189.897 miles)
- Weather: Sunny

Pole position
Driver	(Germany) Michael Schumacher	Ferrari
- Time: 1:22.795

Fastest lap
Driver	(Spain) Fernando Alonso	Renault
- Time: 1:24.569 on lap 23

Podium
First	(Germany) Michael Schumacher	Ferrari
Second	(Spain) Fernando Alonso	Renault
Third	(Colombia) Juan Pablo Montoya	McLaren-Mercedes

The 2006 San Marino Grand Prix (formally the Formula 1 Gran Premio Foster's di San Marino 2006) was a Formula One motor race held at the Autodromo Enzo e Dino Ferrari in Imola, Italy on 23 April 2006. The 62-lap race was the fourth round of the 2006 Formula One season, and the 26th running of the San Marino Grand Prix. It was won by Ferrari driver Michael Schumacher, who had started from pole position. It was both his and Ferrari's first win of the season. Championship leader Fernando Alonso finished second for the Renault team, while Juan Pablo Montoya completed the podium with third position for McLaren.

As a consequence of the race, Schumacher improved his position in the Drivers' Championship from fourth to second. Alonso lengthened his lead in the standings from 14 to 15 points. Kimi Räikkönen remained in third, 3 points behind Schumacher, whilst his teammate Montoya elevated himself ahead of Button into fifth place as a result of his podium finish. Alonso's Renault teammate, Giancarlo Fisichella, dropped to fourth place but still helped to extend the team's lead to 18 points over McLaren in the Constructors' Championship. Ferrari were then 3 points behind McLaren, on a total of 30 points, 15 more than fourth-placed Honda, and 20 more than fifth-placed BMW Sauber.

It was Schumacher's seventh victory at the San Marino Grand Prix, and his fifth win at Imola in six years. This was the last Formula One race to be held in Imola until the 2020 Emilia Romagna Grand Prix.

== Report ==
=== Friday drivers ===
The bottom 6 teams in the 2005 Constructors' Championship and Super Aguri were entitled to run a third car in free practice on Friday. These drivers drove on Friday but did not compete in qualifying or the race. Fabrizio del Monte was set to act as Midland's third driver for this race, but this fell through due to lack of sponsorship.

Constructor	Nat	Driver
Williams-Cosworth	(Austria)	Alexander Wurz
Honda	(United Kingdom)	Anthony Davidson
Red Bull-Ferrari	(Netherlands)	Robert Doornbos
BMW Sauber	(Poland)	Robert Kubica
MF1-Toyota	(Switzerland)	Giorgio Mondini
Toro Rosso-Cosworth	(Switzerland)	Neel Jani
Super Aguri-Honda		none

=== Qualifying ===
Michael Schumacher took pole position, and in doing so, broke Ayrton Senna's record of 65 poles.

=== Race ===
On the first lap, Alonso passed Barrichello at the Tamburello curve. Like the previous Grand Prix, the race started with an accident, this time in the Villeneuve curve. The Super Aguri team's driver Yuji Ide hit MF1's Christijan Albers, putting the Dutchman's car into a series of rolls that left it upside down. Albers was unhurt and Ide was able to continue after replacing his damaged front wing, although he later retired on lap 23. He was reprimanded by the stewards and warned over his future conduct. This incident also formed part of the evidence that led the FIA to withdraw Ide's superlicence later in the season. The Safety Car was deployed for two laps.

Michael Schumacher appeared to have a clear lead coming up to the first set of pit stops, although things started to go wrong after that. His car developed graining in its tyres, which slowed him down considerably. Alonso gained significantly on Schumacher, but could not pass him. The Imola circuit is renowned for being difficult to overtake on.

The race continued normally for some laps, until Toyota driver Jarno Trulli entered the pits to retire following a steering problem. Tonio Liuzzi had a problem and spun his Toro Rosso car in the Variante Alta, a corner which had recently been revised.

Honda driver Rubens Barrichello started the first round of pit stops, on lap 14. His stop lasted 15 seconds, which dropped him to 13th place. Michael Schumacher came into the pits on lap 20, temporarily giving Renault's Fernando Alonso the lead.

Lap 30 saw Honda's Jenson Button make his second stop. The refuelling nozzle got stuck and Button, thinking it had been removed, pulled away from the pits, tearing the nozzle from the refuelling rig. He was delayed in the pitlane while the Honda mechanics removed the nozzle from his car.

By the halfway point of the race, Ferrari began experiencing problems, specifically tyre degradation. Eight laps were enough for Alonso to bring down the 10 second difference between himself and Schumacher. The duel that took place during the 2005 San Marino Grand Prix was to be repeated, this time with Schumacher in the lead.

Lap 41 saw Alonso pit for a second time, ahead of Schumacher. Alonso's out lap was not good enough to put himself in front of Schumacher, so their positions remained the same. Alonso chased hard, but a mistake by running wide into a corner left Schumacher a clear path for the last few laps to win. Meanwhile, David Coulthard had a driveshaft problem and retired on lap 47.

== Classification ==
=== Qualifying ===
Pos.	No.	Driver	Constructor	Q1	Q2	Q3	Grid
1	5	(Germany) Michael Schumacher	Ferrari	1:24.598	1:22.579	1:22.795	1
2	12	(United Kingdom) Jenson Button	Honda	1:24.480	1:23.749	1:22.988	2
3	11	(Brazil) Rubens Barrichello	Honda	1:24.727	1:23.760	1:23.242	3
4	6	(Brazil) Felipe Massa	Ferrari	1:24.884	1:23.595	1:23.702	4
5	1	(Spain) Fernando Alonso	Renault	1:23.536	1:23.743	1:23.709	5
6	7	(Germany) Ralf Schumacher	Toyota	1:24.370	1:23.565	1:23.772	6
7	4	(Colombia) Juan Pablo Montoya	McLaren-Mercedes	1:24.960	1:23.760	1:24.021	7
8	3	(Finland) Kimi Räikkönen	McLaren-Mercedes	1:24.259	1:23.190	1:24.158	8
9	8	(Italy) Jarno Trulli	Toyota	1:24.446	1:23.727	1:24.172	9
10	9	(Australia) Mark Webber	Williams-Cosworth	1:24.992	1:23.718	1:24.795	10
11	2	(Italy) Giancarlo Fisichella	Renault	1:24.434	1:23.771		11
12	17	(Canada) Jacques Villeneuve	BMW Sauber	1:25.081	1:23.887		12
13	10	(Germany) Nico Rosberg	Williams-Cosworth	1:24.495	1:23.966		13
14	14	(United Kingdom) David Coulthard	Red Bull-Ferrari	1:24.849	1:24.101		14
15	16	(Germany) Nick Heidfeld	BMW Sauber	1:25.410	1:24.129		15
16	20	(Italy) Vitantonio Liuzzi	Toro Rosso-Cosworth	1:24.879	1:24.520		16
17	15	(Austria) Christian Klien	Red Bull-Ferrari	1:25.410			17
18	21	(United States) Scott Speed	Toro Rosso-Cosworth	1:25.437			18
19	18	(Portugal) Tiago Monteiro	MF1-Toyota	1:26.820			19
20	19	(Netherlands) Christijan Albers	MF1-Toyota	1:27.088			20
21	22	(Japan) Takuma Sato	Super Aguri-Honda	1:27.609			21
22	23	(Japan) Yuji Ide	Super Aguri-Honda	1:29.282			22

=== Race ===
Pos	No	Driver	Constructor	Tyre	Laps	Time/Retired	Grid	Points
1	5	(Germany) Michael Schumacher	Ferrari	B	62	1:31:06.486	1	10
2	1	(Spain) Fernando Alonso	Renault	M	62	+2.096	5	8
3	4	(Colombia) Juan Pablo Montoya	McLaren-Mercedes	M	62	+15.868	7	6
4	6	(Brazil) Felipe Massa	Ferrari	B	62	+17.096	4	5
5	3	(Finland) Kimi Räikkönen	McLaren-Mercedes	M	62	+17.524	8	4
6	9	(Australia) Mark Webber	Williams-Cosworth	B	62	+37.739	10	3
7	12	(United Kingdom) Jenson Button	Honda	M	62	+39.635	2	2
8	2	(Italy) Giancarlo Fisichella	Renault	M	62	+40.200	11	1
9	7	(Germany) Ralf Schumacher	Toyota	B	62	+45.511	6	
10	11	(Brazil) Rubens Barrichello	Honda	M	62	+1:17.851	3	
11	10	(Germany) Nico Rosberg	Williams-Cosworth	B	62	+1:19.675	13	
12	17	(Canada) Jacques Villeneuve	BMW Sauber	M	62	+1:22.370	12	
13	16	(Germany) Nick Heidfeld	BMW Sauber	M	61	+1 Lap	15	
14	20	(Italy) Vitantonio Liuzzi	Toro Rosso-Cosworth	M	61	+1 Lap	16	
15	21	(United States) Scott Speed	Toro Rosso-Cosworth	M	61	+1 Lap	18	
16	18	(Portugal) Tiago Monteiro	MF1-Toyota	B	60	+2 Laps	19	
Ret	14	(United Kingdom) David Coulthard	Red Bull-Ferrari	M	47	Driveshaft	14	
Ret	22	(Japan) Takuma Sato	Super Aguri-Honda	B	44	Accident	21	
Ret	15	(Austria) Christian Klien	Red Bull-Ferrari	M	40	Hydraulics	17	
Ret	23	(Japan) Yuji Ide	Super Aguri-Honda	B	23	Suspension	22	
Ret	8	(Italy) Jarno Trulli	Toyota	B	5	Steering	9	
Ret	19	(Netherlands) Christijan Albers	MF1-Toyota	B	0	Collision	20	

== Championship standings after the race ==
Drivers' Championship standings

	Pos.	Driver	Points
	1	(Spain) Fernando Alonso	36
2	2	(Germany) Michael Schumacher	21
	3	(Finland) Kimi Räikkönen	18
2	4	(Italy) Giancarlo Fisichella	15
1	5	(Colombia) Juan Pablo Montoya	15

Constructors' Championship standings

Pos.	Constructor	Points
1	(France) Renault	51
2	(United Kingdom) McLaren-Mercedes	33
3	(Italy) Ferrari	30
4	(Japan) Honda	15
5	(Germany) BMW Sauber	10

- Note: Only the top five positions are included for both sets of standings.

== See also ==
- 2006 San Marino GP2 Series round

Previous race: 2006 Australian Grand Prix	FIA Formula One World Championship; 2006 season	Next race: 2006 European Grand Prix
Previous race: 2005 San Marino Grand Prix	San Marino Grand Prix	Next race: None; Next race at Imola: 2020 Emilia Romagna Grand Prix
