= Emilia-Romagna Grand Prix =

Formula One Grand Prix

- Autodromo Internazionale Enzo e Dino Ferrari

Race information
- Number of times held: 5
- First held: 2020
- Last held: 2025
- Most wins (drivers): (Netherlands) Max Verstappen (4)
- Most wins (constructors): (Austria) Red Bull Racing (4)
- Circuit length: 4.909 km (3.050 miles)
- Race length: 309.051 km (192.035 miles)
- Laps: 63

Last race (2025)

Pole position
- (Australia) Oscar Piastri; McLaren-Mercedes; 1:14.670

Podium
- 1. (Netherlands) M. Verstappen; Red Bull Racing-Honda RBPT; 1:31:33.199; 2. (United Kingdom) L. Norris; McLaren-Mercedes; +6.109; 3. (Australia) O. Piastri; McLaren-Mercedes; +12.956

Fastest lap
- (Netherlands) Max Verstappen; Red Bull Racing-Honda RBPT; 1:17.988

The Emilia-Romagna Grand Prix (Italian: Gran Premio dell'Emilia-Romagna), also known as the Imola Grand Prix (Italian: Gran Premio di Imola), was a Formula One motor racing event held at the Autodromo Internazionale Enzo e Dino Ferrari, often referred to as "Imola" after the town where it is located. The event took the name "Emilia-Romagna" from the Italian region where the circuit is located. The venue previously hosted the Italian Grand Prix in 1980, and the San Marino Grand Prix from 1981 to 2006.

The COVID-19 pandemic in 2020 resulted in the cancellation of a number of Grands Prix, so Formula One returned to the Imola circuit in 2020 to fill out the calendar. The race remained on the calendar afterward. In 2023, the event was cancelled due to flooding affecting the Emilia-Romagna region. The Grand Prix was discontinued after the 2025 race.

== History ==
=== 2020–2021 ===
The COVID-19 pandemic in 2020 led to disruption of the originally scheduled race calendar, with a number of races cancelled. The Emilia-Romagna Grand Prix was added to the revised calendar intended as a "one-off" race, as one of several new or returning Grands Prix, in order to make up for the loss of other races. The event used a one-off, two-day weekend format, with one practice session, on Saturday, rather than the usual three. Mercedes's Valtteri Bottas qualified on pole, with teammate Lewis Hamilton winning the race.

Despite originally being intended to be held as a one-off event in 2020, due to the ongoing nature of the COVID-19 pandemic the Emilia-Romagna Grand Prix returned in 2021 on 18 April, replacing the postponed Chinese Grand Prix as the second round of the 2021 season. Lewis Hamilton took pole with Max Verstappen winning a dramatic, rain affected race.

=== 2022–2025 ===
The event appeared on the 2022 calendar for a third consecutive edition, and hosted one of the three sprint formats during the season for the first time. In early 2022, the organisers announced that a contract had been signed to continue organising the Grand Prix until 2025. The Grand Prix awarded Max Verstappen with his second grand slam as he won the race for the second straight year.

The 2023 edition was cancelled due to heavy rainfall and floods caused by Storm Minerva. The 2024 edition saw Max Verstappen win the race with McLaren's Lando Norris coming second and Ferrari's Charles Leclerc third. The 2025 edition, the last held according to the contract, was won by Verstappen ahead of the two McLarens of Norris and Oscar Piastri.

=== Discontinuation ===
In June 2025, it was announced that Formula One would not race at Imola for 2026 and onwards, thereby discontinuing the Emilia-Romagna Grand Prix.

== Winners ==
=== By year ===
All Emilia-Romagna Grands Prix were held at Autodromo Internazionale Enzo e Dino Ferrari.

Year	Driver	Constructor	Report
2020	(United Kingdom) Lewis Hamilton	Mercedes	Report
2021	(Netherlands) Max Verstappen	Red Bull Racing-Honda	Report
2022	(Netherlands) Max Verstappen	Red Bull Racing-RBPT	Report
2023	Not held due to floods in Emilia-Romagna		Report
2024	(Netherlands) Max Verstappen	Red Bull Racing-Honda RBPT	Report
2025	(Netherlands) Max Verstappen	Red Bull Racing-Honda RBPT	Report

=== Repeat winners (drivers) ===
Drivers in bold are competing in the Formula One championship in 2026.

Wins	Driver	Years won
4	**(Netherlands) Max Verstappen**	2021, 2022, 2024, 2025

=== Repeat winners (constructors) ===
Teams in bold are competing in the Formula One championship in 2026.

Wins	Constructor	Years won
4	(Austria) **Red Bull Racing**	2021, 2022, 2024, 2025

=== Repeat winners (engine manufacturers) ===
Manufacturers in bold are competing in the Formula One championship in 2026.

Wins	Manufacturer	Years won
2	(Japan) Honda RBPT	2024, 2025
