= Cadillac MAC-26 =

2026 Formula One car

- Sergio Pérez driving the Cadillac MAC-26 at the 2026 Austrian Grand Prix
- Category: Formula One
- Constructor: Cadillac
- Designers: Nick Chester (Chief Technical Officer); John McQuilliam (Chief Designer); Rob Stubbings (Deputy Chief Designer); James Knapton (Head of Performance Analytics); Simon Dodman (Chief Engineer, Aerodynamics); Jon Tomlinson (Head of Aerodynamics); Pat Symonds (Executive Engineering Consultant)

Technical specifications
- Engine: Ferrari 067/6 1.6 L (98 cu in) direct injection V6 turbocharged engine limited to 15,000 RPM in a mid-mounted, rear-wheel drive layout Turbo
- Transmission: 8 forward + 1 reverse
- Fuel: Shell V-Power sustainable Ethanol
- Lubricants: Shell Helix Ultra
- Tyres: Pirelli P Zero (Dry); Pirelli Cinturato (Wet)

Competition history
- Notable entrants: Cadillac Formula 1 Team
- Notable drivers: 11. Sergio Pérez; 77. Valtteri Bottas
- Debut: 2026 Australian Grand Prix
- Last event: 2026 Singapore Grand Prix
Races	Wins	Podiums	Poles	F/Laps
17	0	0	0	0

The Cadillac MAC-26 is a Formula One car designed and built by the Cadillac Formula 1 Team to compete in the 2026 Formula One World Championship. It is currently being driven by Sergio Pérez and Valtteri Bottas, marking Cadillac's debut season in Formula One. The car made its competitive debut at the 2026 Australian Grand Prix on March 8, 2026.

== History ==
=== Prior history and attempts to enter Formula One ===
The Cadillac Formula 1 Team is the most recent entry onto the Formula One grid, and the brand's first appearance in the sport as a constructor. On two occasions in the 1950s, Cadillac-engined Kurtis Krafts were entered for the Indianapolis 500 while the race was part of the Formula One World Championship. A 2023 attempt to enter the sport as Andretti Cadillac through General Motors (GM) and Andretti Global, led by Michael Andretti, son of 1978 World Champion Mario, was vetoed by the Formula One Group, despite the acceptance of the bid by the Fédération Internationale de l'Automobile (FIA), with the proviso that Formula One Group would reconsider should GM agree to enter as a fully-fledged works team. A second proposal was submitted in 2024, now led by Dan Towriss through Andretti's owner TWG Motorsports and renamed Cadillac, and was approved by the Formula One Group.

=== 2026 regulation changes and development context ===
Significant changes to Formula One's technical regulations were introduced for 2026, affecting both the chassis and engine. For 2026, Cadillac use customer Ferrari Tipo 067/6 V6 turbo hybrid engines, with the works General Motors power unit scheduled to be introduced for the 2029 season.

=== Launch and pre-season ===
The car made its first appearance on track during a private shakedown at Silverstone Circuit in January 2026, before participating in an extended private January 26–30, 2026 shakedown at the Circuit de Barcelona-Catalunya with 9 of the 10 other teams.

Before being revealed, the MAC-26 was shipped to Times Square, New York, where a timer and drape stood until the car was officially unveiled. On February 8, 2026, a short Cadillac commercial aired during a break, unveiling the livery. The team said that their decision to release the commercial during the Super Bowl and ship the car to Times Square was to maximize its visibility to the public. The commercial was directed by Sam Piling and scored by Max Richter. Shortly after the commercial aired, the car was also revealed at Times Square. A longer video, integrating President John F. Kennedy's 1962 speech about putting a man on the Moon, was released after the Super Bowl commercial had aired.

==== Liveries ====
During the Barcelona pre-season shakedown, the MAC-26 wore an all-black livery with an angled Cadillac logo on both sides.

===== Race liveries =====
The MAC-26's race livery was initially an asymmetrical design: black on one side and white on the other. This was the first asymmetrical Formula One livery since the BAR 01 of 1999, which was white and red on one side, and blue and yellow on the other. At the Austrian Grand Prix, the team debuted a revised symmetrical, predominantly white livery, citing positive fan reception of its 2026 Miami Grand Prix livery as part of the reason for the change.

===== Special liveries =====
For the team's first home race, the 2026 Miami Grand Prix, Cadillac launched a special Stars and Stripes livery. The colors of the American flag were blended into Cadillac’s signature black and white color scheme.

For the 2026 British Grand Prix, Cadillac launched a special livery to mark 250 years of American independence as the Grand Prix weekend fell on Independence Day.

==== Name ====
On February 27, 2026, Cadillac announced the chassis name to be MAC-26, with "MAC" for "Mario Andretti Cadillac", after 1978 World Champion Mario Andretti, father of Michael Andretti, who previously attempted to enter the grid as Andretti Global, before changing its entry bid to Cadillac.

== Complete Formula One results ==
Key

Key
Colour	Result
Gold	Winner
Silver	Second place
Bronze	Third place
Green	Other points position
Blue	Other classified position
Blue	Not classified, finished (NC)
Purple	Not classified, retired (Ret)
Red	Did not qualify (DNQ)
Black	Disqualified (DSQ)
White	Did not start (DNS)
White	Race cancelled (C)
Blank	Did not practice (DNP)
Blank	Excluded (EX)
Blank	Did not arrive (DNA)
Blank	Withdrawn (WD)
Blank	Did not enter (empty cell)
Annotation	Meaning
P	Pole position
F	Fastest lap
Superscript number	Points-scoring position in sprint

Year	Entrant	Power unit	Tyres	Driver name	Grands Prix																							Points	WCC pos.
Year	Entrant	Power unit	Tyres	Driver name	AUS	CHN	JPN	MIA	CAN	MON	BCN	AUT	GBR	BEL	HUN	NED	ITA	ESP	AZE	BHR	SIN	USA	MXC	SAP	LVG	QAT	ABU	Points	WCC pos.
2026	Cadillac Formula 1 Team	Ferrari 067/6	P	(Mexico) Sergio Pérez	16	15	17	16	Ret	15	14	Ret	14	Ret	Ret	15	18	Ret	14	19	17							0*	11th*
2026	Cadillac Formula 1 Team	Ferrari 067/6	P	(Finland) Valtteri Bottas	Ret	13	19	18	16	Ret	Ret	Ret	16	18	Ret	Ret	19	18	16†	Ret	19							0*	11th*

* Season still in progress.
