= McLaren MCL40 =

2026 Formula One car

- Lando Norris drives the MCL40 at the 2026 Austrian Grand Prix
- Category: Formula One
- Designer: Rob Marshall (Chief Designer)
- Predecessor: McLaren MCL39

Technical specifications
- Chassis: Carbon fibre composite
- Engine: Mercedes-AMG F1 M17 E Performance 1.6 L (98 cu in) direct injection V6 turbocharged engine limited to 15,000 RPM in a mid-mounted, rear-wheel drive layout
- Electric motor: Mercedes-AMG Kinetic energy recovery system
- Transmission: McLaren 8-speed + 1 reverse sequential seamless semi-automatic transmission operated via paddle shifters.
- Battery: Lithium-ion battery
- Fuel: Petronas
- Lubricants: Motul
- Tyres: Pirelli P Zero (Dry/Slick); Pirelli Cinturato (Wet/Treaded)

Competition history
- Notable entrants: McLaren Mastercard F1 Team
- Notable drivers: 1. (United Kingdom) Lando Norris; 81. (Australia) Oscar Piastri
- Debut: 2026 Australian Grand Prix
- First win: 2026 Hungarian Grand Prix
- Last win: 2026 São Paulo Grand Prix
- Last event: 2026 Las Vegas Grand Prix
Races	Wins	Podiums	Poles	F/Laps
21	3	10	4	2

The McLaren MCL40 is a Formula One car designed and built by McLaren under the direction of Rob Marshall to compete in the 2026 Formula One World Championship. It is driven by reigning world champion Lando Norris and Oscar Piastri in their eighth and fourth seasons with the team respectively. As of the 2026 São Paulo Grand Prix, it has achieved three Grand Prix victories, four Grand Prix pole positions, eight Grand Prix podiums, two Grand Prix fastest laps, one sprint pole position, one sprint win, five sprint podiums and two sprint fastest laps.

== Background ==
=== Development context ===
Significant changes to the technical regulations were introduced for 2026, affecting both the chassis and power unit. In general, these changes simplified the power unit and increased the share of energy generated by the electric motor compared to the combustion engine, as well as reducing the overall size and weight of the car and reducing the amount of downforce aerodynamic surfaces can generate.

Mercedes AMG HPP, McLaren's engine supplier since 2021, was subject to scrutiny over the winter break as it emerged their engine exploited a measurement loophole in the power unit regulations. The compression ratio of the combustion engine was restricted in the 2026 regulations, which would reduce the amount of power the engine could produce. However, the compression ratio was measured by the Fédération Internationale de l'Automobile (FIA) at ambient temperatures. Mercedes was able to find a manufacturing technique that would allow the compression ratio to expand when the engine was hot, allowing it to produce more power while still complying with the FIA test.

=== Initial design and early development ===
Initial work on the car began in 2024. Chief designer Rob Marshall stated that McLaren would not deliver any significant changes to the car between the private test and the opening round of the season. Marshall stated McLaren's priority would be understanding how the 2026 regulation cars worked before pursuing performance improvements. Marshall identified packaging for radiators and electrical boxes as a particular challenge given the reduced size of the car.

=== Livery ===
The MCL40 used a one-off black and silver geometric livery for the private pre-season test at Circuit de Barcelona-Catalunya. The MCL40 livery is similar to the MCL39, featuring more orange on the engine cover and front wing to comply with the new livery regulation and introduced a dark green airbox and mirrors for sponsor Allwyn Entertainment. This maintained McLaren's practice of retaining the livery of a successful car for the following season. As with all McLaren cars since the MCL35, the car's livery is applied with vinyl wrap rather than paint.

==== Special liveries ====
- At the Monaco and Barcelona-Catalunya Grands Prix, McLaren raced a special livery to celebrate its 1,000th Grand Prix. The livery consists of a bespoke metallic papaya orange and anthracite livery and features the numbers 0001 and 1000 adorning the sidepods. The livery also contain details recognising the team's history (such as the Bruce McLaren Motor Racing logo on the base of halo) and important milestones (such as the race dates of the first and 1,000th Grand Prix above the numbers 0001 and 1000, respectively).
- For the British Grand Prix, McLaren collaborated with Google Gemini to launch a special livery based on the M2B to celebrate the team's beginnings.
- For the Italian and Spanish Grands Prix, McLaren featured an "enhanced" OKX livery.
- For the Mexico City Grand Prix, McLaren will race a livery featuring of fans' stories and artwork in collaboration with Velo.

=== Auction ===
Unusually, McLaren auctioned the rights to an MCL40 with RM Sotheby's before the season began. The car sold for US$11,480,000. Its owner will be able to select which driver's chassis to receive, and it will be delivered in a running condition in 2028.

== Competition and development history ==
=== Opening rounds ===
Piastri qualified fifth and Norris sixth for the Australian Grand Prix. Piastri did not start the Grand Prix after crashing on a reconnaissance lap, which he said was caused by "a large element of [him]", but also the energy deployment rules of the electric motor unexpectedly delivering 100 kW (130 hp) more power than expected. Norris finished fifth after battling with Max Verstappen.

After finishing the sprint fourth and sixth in China, neither driver started the race due to power unit issues. This was the team's first double non-start since the 2005 United States Grand Prix.

At the Japanese Grand Prix, Piastri qualified third and Norris fifth. Piastri took the race lead at the start; he opted to change tyres on lap 18 to avoid the risk of Charles Leclerc undercutting him, though lost his advantage during a safety car period. Piastri finished second, and Norris fifth.

The MCL40 was used in a two-day tyre test in April for sole supplier Pirelli at the Nürburgring. Piastri completed 66 laps and Norris 108.. In that same period, the originally scheduled April dates of the Bahrain and Saudi Arabian Grands Prix were called off due to the impact of the 2026 Iran war. Stella announced that "an entirely new MCL40" would be introduced over the two North American races following the break.

After the hiatus, McLaren took advantage with their upgrades in the 2026 Miami Grand Prix and thus, claiming Norris a sprint pole and a sprint win. In the main race, both Norris and Piastri finished 2nd and 3rd respectively, just behind Mercedes' Kimi Antonelli, with the former having his first podium as defending champion.

=== Mid-season rounds ===
For a special commemoration of reaching 1000 Grands Prix, the MCL40 had a special livery for Monaco, making McLaren the second team to reach that milestone since Ferrari in the 2020 Tuscan Grand Prix. After starting 7th and 8th, the team had a bittersweet race with Lando retiring for the second consecutive time due to a battery related issue as Piastri bags 5th place, originally 4th before Gasly's podium was overturned.

== Complete Formula One results ==
Key

Key
Colour	Result
Gold	Winner
Silver	Second place
Bronze	Third place
Green	Other points position
Blue	Other classified position
Blue	Not classified, finished (NC)
Purple	Not classified, retired (Ret)
Red	Did not qualify (DNQ)
Black	Disqualified (DSQ)
White	Did not start (DNS)
White	Race cancelled (C)
Blank	Did not practice (DNP)
Blank	Excluded (EX)
Blank	Did not arrive (DNA)
Blank	Withdrawn (WD)
Blank	Did not enter (empty cell)
Annotation	Meaning
P	Pole position
F	Fastest lap
Superscript number	Points-scoring position in sprint

Year	Entrant	Engine	Tyres	Drivers	Grands Prix																							Points	WCC
Year	Entrant	Engine	Tyres	Drivers	AUS	CHN	JPN	MIA	CAN	MON	BCN	AUT	GBR	BEL	HUN	NED	ITA	ESP	AZE	BHR	SIN	USA	MXC	SAP	LVG	QAT	ABU	Points	WCC
2026	McLaren F1 Team	Mercedes-AMG	P	(United Kingdom) Lando Norris	5	DNS^{4}	5	2^{1 F}	Ret^{2}	Ret	3	7	4^{3}	7^{F}	1^{P}	1^{3 P}	4	3^{P}	Ret	9	4^{8}	5	5	1^{P}	2			431*	4th*
2026	McLaren F1 Team	Mercedes-AMG	P	(Australia) Oscar Piastri	DNS	DNS^{6}	2	3^{2}	11^{4}	4	5	4	11^{7}	5	Ret	6^{5}	5	8	13	6	5	7	13	6	3			431*	4th*

* Season still in progress.
