= Peter Crolla =

British engineer

- Born: Peter J. Crolla; Bradford, West Riding of Yorkshire, England
- Citizenship: British
- Occupation: Engineer
- Employer: Cadillac F1 Team
- Known for: Formula One engineer
- Title: Race Team Manager

Peter J. Crolla is a British Formula One engineer. Since 2025, he has been serving as the Race Team Manager of the Cadillac F1 Team; he previously served as the team manager of Haas F1 Team as well as team leader of McLaren.

== Career ==
Crolla started his career in motorsport in 2004 as a data engineer for Team Dynamics which was competing in the British Touring Car Championship. After one year with the team he moved to Fortec Motorsport which competed in British Formula 3 International Series where he was a race engineer for two years and then became team manager from 2007 to 2010. In 2011 he returned to Team Dynamics as team manager. He stayed there for three years, until Crolla joined McLaren Racing as garage team leader. Seeking a new challenge, Crolla joined the fledging Haas team as race team co-ordinator and the team's 14th employee. He was appointed team manager in September 2017 until 2021 where he was appointed trackside operations manager, overseeing garage operations as well as sporting governance and liasing sporting matters with Michael Masi and the FIA until 2022 where he returned to his former position as Team Manager once again from 2022 to January 2025. In January 2025, Crolla left the team to join the Cadillac F1 Team as Race Team Manager, starting from April 2025.
