= Marcin Budkowski =

Polish motorsports engineer (born 1977)

- Born: Marcin Szczęsny Budkowski; 23 April 1977 (age 49); Warsaw, Polish People's Republic
- Education: Ecole polytechnique Institut supérieur de l'aéronautique et de l'espace Imperial College London
- Occupations: Motorsport executive; engineer
- Employer(s): Cadillac (2026–present); Alpine (2021–2022); Renault (2017–2020); FIA (2014–2017); McLaren (2007–2014); Ferrari (2002–2007); Prost (2001–2002)
- Known for: Formula One engineer
- Title: Team Principal

Marcin Szczęsny Budkowski (born 23 April 1977) is a Polish Formula One engineer. Since August 2026, Budkowski has been team principal of Cadillac Formula 1 Team. He previously was the executive director of Alpine F1 Team.

== Education ==
Budkowski graduated from École Polytechnique, Paris, in 1999 and continued his studies between 1999 and 2001 at the Institut supérieur de l'aéronautique et de l'espace (ISAE SUPAERO) and Imperial College London, specialising in aeronautics and aerodynamics.

== Motorsport career ==
After completing his studies, Budkowski started his career in motorsport in 2001 as an aerodynamicist for Prost. Budkowski subsequently moved to Maranello, working for Ferrari between 2002 and 2007 in a period that saw the team winning multiple championships.

Seeking a new challenge, he then joined McLaren in 2007, working in a variety of aerodynamic roles both at the factory and trackside, notably during the 2008 title winning year, before becoming head of aerodynamics in 2012.

His seven years at McLaren ended in 2014, after which he became Formula 1's technical and sporting coordinator for the FIA, subsequently becoming head of the Formula One technical department in 2017. He then joined Renault F1 Team as executive technical director, where he remained as the team transitioned into the Alpine F1 Team. In this role he oversaw the day-to-day running and operation of the team, worked closely with senior management and directors to ensure that the team met its objectives, he also worked with HR and finance to manage budgets and recruitment. In January 2021 he was made a director of Alpine F1 Team, a position he left in January 2022. In February 2023, he joined Viaplay as tech analyst for Polish Formula 1 broadcast.

On 12 August 2026, he joined Cadillac Formula 1 Team as team principal.
