= Cadillac in Formula One =

Formula One constructor

(United States) Cadillac-Ferrari
- Full name: Cadillac Formula 1 Team
- Base: Fishers, Indiana, U.S.; Concord, North Carolina, U.S.; Warren, Michigan, U.S.; Silverstone, England
- Team principal(s): Marcin Budkowski (Team Principal); Dan Towriss (CEO); Rob White (COO)
- Chief Technical Officer: Nick Chester
- Website: cadillacf1team.com

2026 Formula One World Championship
- Race drivers: 11. (Mexico) Sergio Pérez; 77. (Finland) Valtteri Bottas
- Test driver(s): 24. (China) Zhou Guanyu; (United States) Colton Herta
- Chassis: MAC-26
- Engine: Ferrari 067/6
- Tyres: Pirelli

Formula One World Championship career
- First entry: 2026 Australian Grand Prix
- Last entry: 2026 São Paulo Grand Prix
- Races entered: 20 (20 starts)
- Engines: Ferrari
- Constructors' Championships: 0
- Drivers' Championships: 0
- Race victories: 0
- Podiums: 0
- Points: 0
- Pole positions: 0
- Fastest laps: 0

The American car manufacturer General Motors (GM) has been a Formula One constructor under the luxury Cadillac brand as Cadillac Formula 1 Team since 2026 and is expected to become a power unit manufacturer starting in 2029. GM collaborates with American motorsport organization TWG Motorsports through the latter's British subsidiary, TWG Cadillac Formula 1 Team Limited.

Cadillac became the first new, independent constructor to join the grid since Haas in 2016. The project has three bases in the United States—in Fishers, Indiana; Concord, North Carolina; and Warren, Michigan—as well as a British base in Silverstone. The engine department will be based in North Carolina.

== Background ==
=== Early GM engine involvement (1951–1953) ===
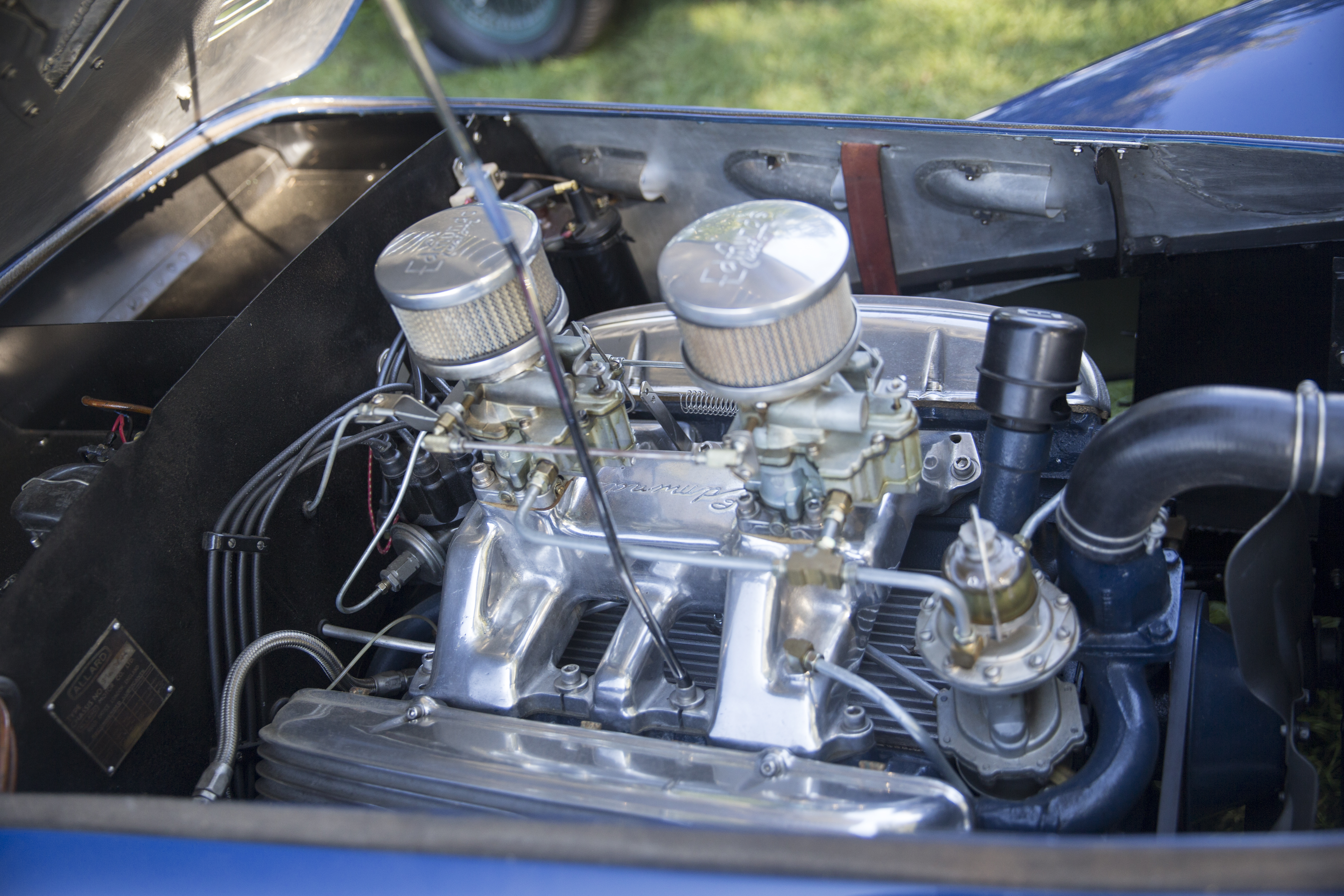
The Cadillac 331 series V8 appeared at the Indianapolis 500 in 1952 and 1953, when it featured in the Formula One World Championship.

Cadillac as a Formula One engine manufacturer
- Official name(s): GM Performance Power Units LLC
- Base: Concord, North Carolina, U.S. (2027–)
- Notable staff: Russ O'Blenes (chief executive officer)

Several GM marques participated in the Indianapolis 500 when it counted towards the FIA World Championship of Drivers from 1950 to 1960:

- 1951: Gordon Reid entered a Chevrolet-engined Silnes car but failed to qualify.
- 1952: Johnny Fedricks entered a Cadillac-engined Kurtis Kraft car but failed to qualify.
- 1953: Bill Homeier entered a Cadillac-engined Kurtis Kraft car but failed to qualify.

=== Establishment (2023–present) ===
In January 2023, General Motors (GM) and the Michael Andretti-led Andretti Global announced their intention to enter GM's Cadillac brand into the Formula One World Championship. The FIA approved their bid but the Formula One Group vetoed it, explaining that it would reconsider its decision if GM agreed to manufacture Formula One engines. Following the rejection, Andretti continued to build up the team and operations using Toyota's wind tunnel in Cologne, which McLaren had recently vacated.

In November 2024, following extended disputes between the Formula One Group and Michael Andretti, Andretti Global sponsor TWG Global—led by Mark Walter—announced that it was taking over the business operation in areas such as sponsorship, infrastructure planning, and organizational growth. Michael Andretti remained as an advisor, while his father, Mario, agreed to serve on the board of directors. The team renamed its British subsidiary from Andretti Racing to Cadillac, and eventually TWG Cadillac Formula 1 Team Ltd.

That month, the Formula One Group tentatively approved Cadillac as a new constructor for the 2026 season. The entry received its final approval in March 2025, in time for Cadillac to sign the latest Concorde Agreement. The approval by the FIA and Formula One Management confirmed Cadillac's place on the grid as the championship's 11th team for the 2026 season. Cadillac will be the first debutant Formula One venture since Haas in 2016. GM paid an expansion fee of US$450 million, over twice as much as originally demanded. In addition, GM announced that it would begin manufacturing engines for Cadillac for the 2029 season; until then, the team will compete with Ferrari engines. In November, Cadillac made its testing debut at Imola with Sergio Pérez driving a blank-liveried Ferrari SF-23.

The project has been described as part of an effort to expand American involvement in top-tier motorsport. Team representatives have emphasized community engagement, workforce development, and long-term competitiveness over short-term marketing aims.

== Constructor personnel ==
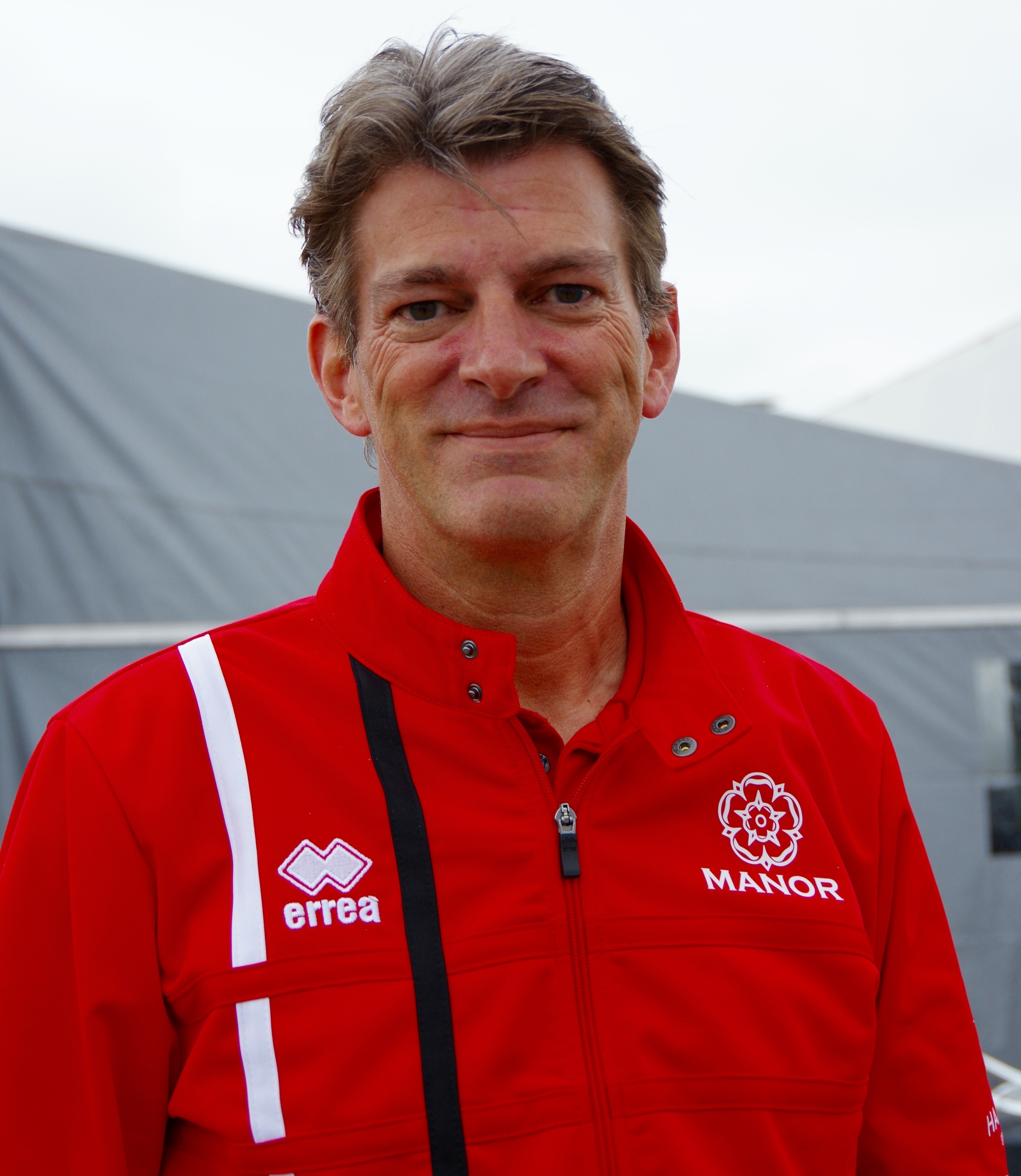
Graeme Lowdon, the former CEO of Virgin and Marussia, was hired as the inaugural team principal.

In December 2024, Cadillac hired the former Virgin and Marussia CEO, Graeme Lowdon, as team principal. Lowdon is overseen by Dan Towriss, the CEO of TWG Motorsports. The team has hired several alumni of "Team Enstone" in senior roles, including: Formula One chief technical officer Pat Symonds, operations officer Rob White, technical director Nick Chester, aerodynamicist Jon Tomlinson, and advisor Naoki Tokunaga. Former Scuderia Ferrari race engineer, Xavi Marcos, is chief race engineer.

Ahead of signing their drivers, Lowdon said that he intended to hire drivers based on merit, although he "[saw] no reason why an American driver [could not] be selected on merit". Mario Andretti had stated that the team planned to pair an experienced driver with a younger American driver, who would likely be Andretti Global driver Colton Herta. Cadillac would sign World Drivers' Championship runners-up Sergio Pérez and Valtteri Bottas as their inaugural driver line-up, citing their experience over American options such as Herta and Josef Newgarden. Herta later agreed to become a test driver and depart IndyCar for FIA Formula 2 in 2026 with support from Cadillac. Simon Pagenaud, Pietro Fittipaldi, Charlie Eastwood, and Alec Udell also joined the team as simulator drivers. Bottas' former Sauber teammate Zhou Guanyu joined the team as their reserve driver.

In August, 2026, Marcin Budkowski was appointed as Team Principal, replacing Graeme Lowdon. In September, the team signed former Red Bull Racing Chief Designer Craig Skinner, taking the role of Chief Development Engineer, with former Aston Martin Aerodynamics and Deputy Technical Director Eric Blandin, having previously worked at Red Bull, Ferrari, and Mercedes, joining as Head of Aerodynamics. Tim Lean also joined the team as Chief Engineer, following previous tenures at Ferrari, Red Bull, and McLaren.

== Power unit program ==
GM and TWG established GM Performance Power Units LLC (GM PPU) to produce works engines for the Cadillac team, and hired longtime GM engine designer Russ O'Blenes to lead the engine division. In addition, Joe Saward reported that GM was seeking to purchase the intellectual property of Renault's former power unit program. GM PPU plans to produce Formula One power units for the 2029 season, using Ferrari power units and gearboxes until then. GM PPU announced that it plans to spend US$65–70 million building an engine factory for 300–350 employees, which is expected to open in the first quarter of 2027, and an additional US$75–80 million in start-up fees.

In February 2025, the City of Concord approved a US$150 million project to construct a 204,045-square-foot facility at 4295 Defender Way, adjacent to the Hendrick Motorsports campus. The facility, which involves a US$70 million construction cost and an additional US$80 million investment in state-of-the-art dynamometers and R&D equipment, is expected to be fully operational by the first quarter of 2027. Until the permanent site is completed, GM PPU is conducting preliminary testing and engineering at an interim facility located at 4540 Fortune Way NW in Concord.

== Facilities ==
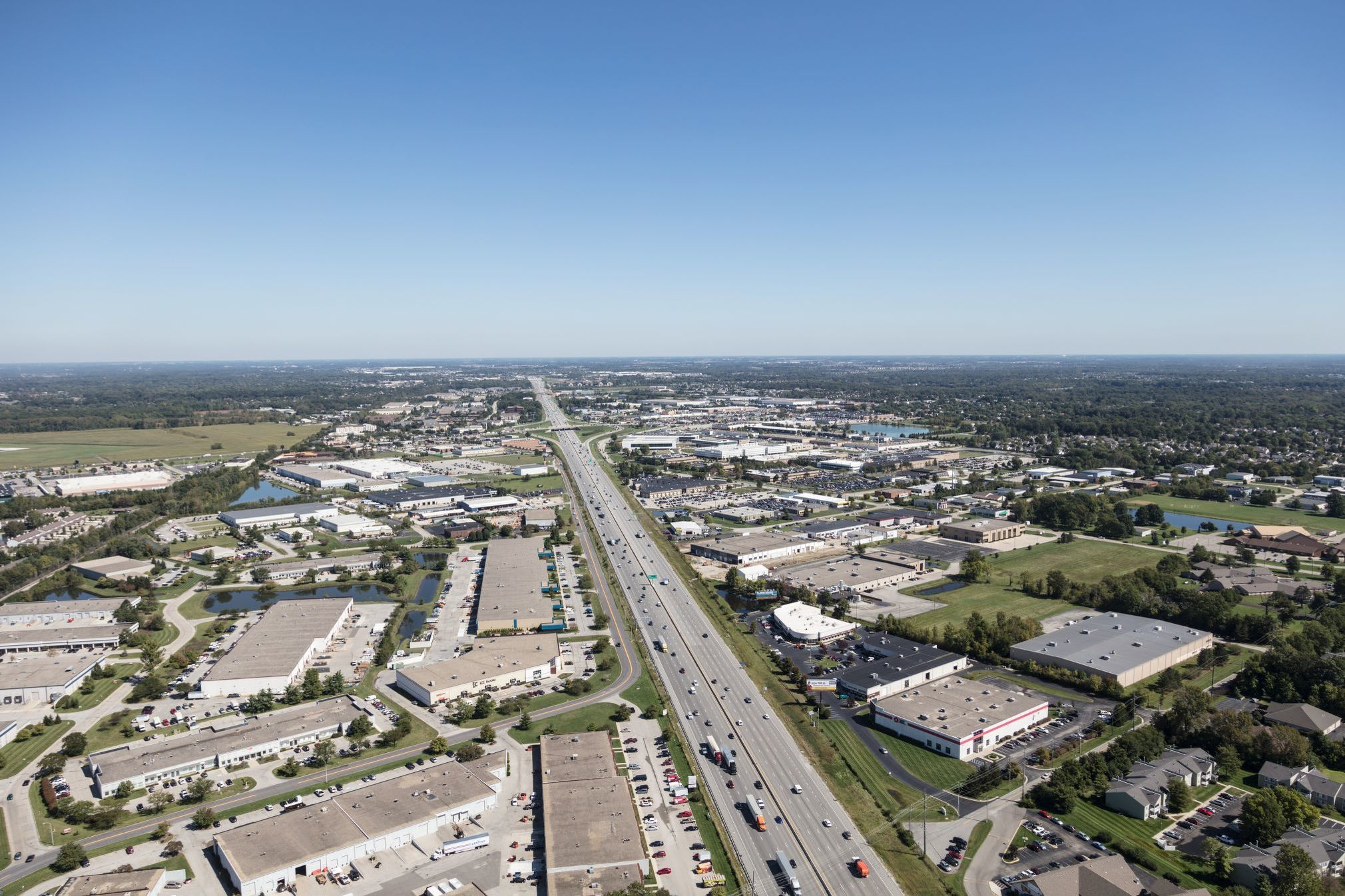
Cadillac will be headquartered at a purpose-built facility in Fishers, Indiana.

Cadillac plans to operate four facilities, in: Fishers, Indiana; Concord, North Carolina; Warren, Michigan; and Northamptonshire, England. The organization will be headquartered at a brand-new facility in Fishers—a suburb of Indianapolis—which will handle "the bulk" of manufacturing. In January 2026, team principal Graeme Lowdon stated that the organization had advertised 595 positions, receiving 143,265 applications, and had hired 520 staff by the end of 2025. Andretti Global initially suggested that it would base its Formula One and IndyCar operations in same building, but the IndyCar operation was ultimately moved to a different facility; Formula One regulations prohibit the use of multi-team facilities. GM will build a 204,000-square foot power unit facility near its Charlotte Technical Center in Concord. Additional operations will take place in Warren—the location of the General Motors Technical Center. In addition, the team has signed a long-term agreement with Toyota to rent their wind tunnel in Cologne, Germany. The race team, competing under an American racing licence, and chassis designers will operate from a facility in Silverstone, England.

The Fishers campus represents a US$200 million investment and serves as the primary hub for chassis manufacturing and research and development. While originally intended as a universal headquarters for all Andretti Global programs, the 400,000-square-foot facility was repurposed for exclusive Formula One use to comply with FIA regulations prohibiting the co-location of multiple racing series to prevent cost-cap circumvention. Consequently, non-F1 operations, including IndyCar and Formula E, were relocated to a separate 240,000-square-foot facility in Indianapolis.

== Complete Formula One World Championship results ==
Key

Key
Colour	Result
Gold	Winner
Silver	Second place
Bronze	Third place
Green	Other points position
Blue	Other classified position
Blue	Not classified, finished (NC)
Purple	Not classified, retired (Ret)
Red	Did not qualify (DNQ)
Black	Disqualified (DSQ)
White	Did not start (DNS)
White	Race cancelled (C)
Blank	Did not practice (DNP)
Blank	Excluded (EX)
Blank	Did not arrive (DNA)
Blank	Withdrawn (WD)
Blank	Did not enter (empty cell)
Annotation	Meaning
P	Pole position
F	Fastest lap
Superscript number	Points-scoring position in sprint

Year	Chassis	Engine	Tyres	Drivers	1	2	3	4	5	6	7	8	9	10	11	12	13	14	15	16	17	18	19	20	21	22	23	Points	WCC
2026	MAC-26	Ferrari 067/6 1.6 V6 t	P		AUS	CHN	JPN	MIA	CAN	MON	BCN	AUT	GBR	BEL	HUN	NED	ITA	ESP	AZE	BHR	SIN	USA	MXC	SAP	LVG	QAT	ABU	0*	11th*
2026	MAC-26	Ferrari 067/6 1.6 V6 t	P	(Finland) Valtteri Bottas	Ret	13	19	18	16	Ret	Ret	Ret	16	18	Ret	Ret	19	18	16†	Ret	19	Ret	Ret	DNS				0*	11th*
2026	MAC-26	Ferrari 067/6 1.6 V6 t	P	(Mexico) Sergio Pérez	16	15	17	16	Ret	15	14	Ret	14	Ret	Ret	15	18	Ret	14	19	17	19	16	18				0*	11th*

Notes

- * – Season still in progress.
