= 2026 Monaco Grand Prix =

Formula One motor race

Race 6 of 23 (Note: At the time of the event Formula One planned to hold twenty-two Grands Prix.) in the 2026 Formula One World Championship
| ← Previous race | Next race → |
- Layout of the Circuit de Monte Carlo, Monaco

Race details
- Date: 7 June 2026
- Official name: Formula 1 Louis Vuitton Grand Prix de Monaco 2026
- Location: Circuit de Monaco; La Condamine and Monte Carlo, Monaco
- Course: Street circuit
- Course length: 3.337 km (2.074 miles)
- Distance: 78 laps, 260.286 km (161.772 miles)
- Weather: Sunny. Max. ambient temp. 25.6°C, max. track temp. 46°C.

Pole position
| Driver | (Italy) Kimi Antonelli | Mercedes |
- Time: 1:12.051

Fastest lap
| Driver | (Italy) Kimi Antonelli | Mercedes |
- Time: 1:13.481 on lap 76

Podium
| First | (Italy) Kimi Antonelli | Mercedes |
| Second | (United Kingdom) Lewis Hamilton | Ferrari |
| Third | (France) Isack Hadjar | Red Bull Racing-Red Bull Ford |

The 2026 Monaco Grand Prix (officially known as the Formula 1 Louis Vuitton Grand Prix de Monaco 2026) was a Formula One motor race. It was held on 7 June 2026, at the Circuit de Monaco in Monaco, and was the sixth round of the 2026 Formula One World Championship.

Converting pole position into a victory, Kimi Antonelli (Mercedes) became the youngest driver to win the Monaco Grand Prix and the youngest to achieve a Grand Slam. Lewis Hamilton (Ferrari) and Isack Hadjar (Red Bull) completed the podium, marking Hadjar's first podium of the season. The Grand Prix result was contested and faced several appeals, before the classification was finalised in September 2026.

== Background ==
The event was held at the Circuit de Monaco in Monaco for the 83rd time in the circuit's history, across the weekend of 5–7 June. The Grand Prix was the sixth round of the 2026 Formula One World Championship and the 72nd running of the Monaco Grand Prix as a round of the Formula One World Championship.

=== Championship standings before the race ===
Going into the weekend, Kimi Antonelli led the Drivers' Championship with 131 points, 43 points ahead of his teammate George Russell in second, and 56 ahead of Charles Leclerc in third. Mercedes, with 219 points, led the Constructors' Championship from Ferrari and McLaren, who were second and third with 147 and 106 points, respectively.

=== Entrants ===
The drivers and teams were the same as the season entry list with no additional stand-in drivers for the race.

The Chinese Grand Prix marked McLaren's 1,000th entry, though neither car started the race. Had the team made a start at the Chinese Grand Prix, this event would have marked their 1,000th race start. As 2026 also marked the 60th anniversary of the 1966 Monaco Grand Prix, where the team made its debut, the team opted to celebrate their 1,000th Grand Prix at this event.

=== Tyre choices ===
Tyre supplier Pirelli brought the C3, C4, and C5 tyre compounds—the softest three in their range (designated hard, medium, and soft, respectively)—for teams to use at the event.

=== Active aerodynamics ===
For this Grand Prix, Formula One's new active-aero "straight mode" was not used. The FIA made the decision on safety grounds, given Monaco's tight, twisty street layout and limited straights. "Overtake mode" remained available for the event.

== Practice ==
Three free practice sessions were held for the event. The first free practice session was held on 5 June 2026, at 13:30 local time (UTC+2), and was topped by Charles Leclerc (Ferrari) ahead of his teammate Lewis Hamilton and Max Verstappen (Red Bull). The session was red-flagged twice; the first came from Verstappen's teammate Isack Hadjar crashing into the wall at turn 14, and the second was observed late in the session due to debris from Fernando Alonso (Aston Martin). The second free practice was held on the same day, at 17:00 local time, and was topped by Hamilton ahead of Leclerc and Verstappen. In the closing stages of the session, a red flag was as the brakes on the Cadillac of Sergio Pérez overheated and caught fire. The third free practice was held on 6 June 2026, at 12:30 local time, and was topped by Kimi Antonelli (Mercedes) ahead of Leclerc and Hamilton. A red flag was observed after Oliver Bearman (Haas) crashed into the wall at turn 3.

== Qualifying ==
Qualifying was held on 6 June 2026, at 16:00 local time (UTC+2), and determined the starting grid order for the race.

=== Qualifying report ===
Ferrari entered qualifying as one of the favourites for pole position after showing strong pace in practice, although Kimi Antonelli (Mercedes) had topped the final practice session earlier in the day. The opening segment (Q1) was congested, with most drivers heading out early on soft tyres, Max Verstappen (Red Bull) delayed his first run and initially had to deal with traffic. Charles Leclerc (Ferrari) set the fastest time in Q1, ahead of Verstappen, Antonelli and Lando Norris (McLaren). Antonelli was shown the black-and-white flag during the session for failing to follow the race director's instructions.

Q1 was interrupted in the closing minutes when Gabriel Bortoleto (Audi) clipped the barriers at the entry to the Nouvelle chicane, damaging his suspension and bringing out the red flag. The session resumed with just over two minutes remaining, leaving several drivers to queue for a final attempt. Carlos Sainz Jr. (Williams) improved to tenth to escape elimination, while Esteban Ocon (Haas), Sergio Pérez (Cadillac), Oliver Bearman (Haas), Valtteri Bottas (Cadillac), Fernando Alonso and Lance Stroll (both Aston Martin) were knocked out. Bortoleto advanced in fifteenth place, but the damage from his crash prevented him from taking part in Q2 (the second segment).

Q2 began with a near miss between Sainz and Verstappen in the pit lane, with Williams releasing Sainz into Verstappen's path. The incident was noted by the stewards, but no further action was taken. Antonelli set the early pace in Q2 before Verstappen moved ahead late in the session. Isack Hadjar (Red Bull) was third-fastest, while George Russell (Mercedes) struggled moved through to the third segment (Q3) in eighth. Alexander Albon (Williams), Sainz, Nico Hülkenberg (Audi), Franco Colapinto (Alpine), Arvid Lindblad (Racing Bulls) and Bortoleto were eliminated.

Antonelli set the first representative time in Q3, with Verstappen coming in 0.001 seconds back. Leclerc aborted his first run before returning on fresh soft tyres and briefly taking provisional pole. Verstappen then moved ahead, but Antonelli improved on his final flying lap, securing pole position. Lewis Hamilton (Ferrari) qualified third, just over two tenths of a second behind Antonelli.

Leclerc made a final attempt in front of his home crowd, but lost the rear of his Ferrari at Tabac, hit the barrier and stopped the damaged car at Rascasse. He remained fourth on the grid, ahead of Hadjar and Russell. Oscar Piastri and Norris qualified seventh and eighth for McLaren, with Pierre Gasly (Alpine) and Liam Lawson (Racing Bulls) completing the top ten.

=== Qualifying classification ===
| Pos. | No. | Driver | Constructor | Qualifying times | | | Final grid |
| Pos. | No. | Driver | Constructor | Q1 | Q2 | Q3 | Final grid |
|---|---|---|---|---|---|---|---|
| 1 | 12 | (Italy) Kimi Antonelli | Mercedes | 1:13.599 | 1:12.704 | 1:12.051 | 1 |
| 2 | 3 | (Netherlands) Max Verstappen | Red Bull Racing-Red Bull Ford | 1:13.490 | 1:12.499 | 1:12.094 | 2 |
| 3 | 44 | (United Kingdom) Lewis Hamilton | Ferrari | 1:13.777 | 1:12.934 | 1:12.279 | 3 |
| 4 | 16 | (Monaco) Charles Leclerc | Ferrari | 1:13.293 | 1:12.774 | 1:12.351 | 4 |
| 5 | 6 | (France) Isack Hadjar | Red Bull Racing-Red Bull Ford | 1:14.408 | 1:12.722 | 1:12.434 | 5 |
| 6 | 63 | (United Kingdom) George Russell | Mercedes | 1:14.214 | 1:13.238 | 1:12.445 | 6 |
| 7 | 81 | (Australia) Oscar Piastri | McLaren-Mercedes | 1:14.159 | 1:12.983 | 1:12.624 | 7 |
| 8 | 1 | (United Kingdom) Lando Norris | McLaren-Mercedes | 1:13.630 | 1:12.919 | 1:12.765 | 8 |
| 9 | 10 | (France) Pierre Gasly | Alpine-Mercedes | 1:14.469 | 1:13.762 | 1:13.226 | 9 |
| 10 | 30 | (New Zealand) Liam Lawson | Racing Bulls-Red Bull Ford | 1:14.498 | 1:13.471 | 1:13.412 | 10 |
| 11 | 23 | (Thailand) Alexander Albon | Atlassian Williams-Mercedes | 1:14.321 | 1:13.787 | N/A | 11 |
| 12 | 55 | (Spain) Carlos Sainz Jr. | Atlassian Williams-Mercedes | 1:14.348 | 1:13.815 | N/A | 12 |
| 13 | 27 | (Germany) Nico Hülkenberg | Audi | 1:13.923 | 1:13.902 | N/A | 13 |
| 14 | 43 | (Argentina) Franco Colapinto | Alpine-Mercedes | 1:14.573 | 1:13.995 | N/A | 14 |
| 15 | 41 | (United Kingdom) Arvid Lindblad | Racing Bulls-Red Bull Ford | 1:14.685 | 1:14.248 | N/A | 15 |
| 16 | 5 | (Brazil) Gabriel Bortoleto | Audi | 1:14.683 | No time | N/A | 16 |
| 17 | 31 | (France) Esteban Ocon | Haas-Ferrari | 1:14.722 | N/A | N/A | 17 |
| 18 | 11 | (Mexico) Sergio Pérez | Cadillac-Ferrari | 1:14.747 | N/A | N/A | 18 |
| 19 | 87 | (United Kingdom) Oliver Bearman | Haas-Ferrari | 1:14.814 | N/A | N/A | 19 |
| 20 | 77 | (Finland) Valtteri Bottas | Cadillac-Ferrari | 1:15.283 | N/A | N/A | 20 |
| 21 | 14 | (Spain) Fernando Alonso | Aston Martin Aramco-Honda | 1:15.349 | N/A | N/A | 21 |
| 22 | 18 | (Canada) Lance Stroll | Aston Martin Aramco-Honda | 1:16.061 | N/A | N/A | 22 |
107% time: 1:18.423

== Race ==
The race was held on 7 June 2026, at 15:00 local time (UTC+2), and was run for 78 laps.

=== Race report ===
Before the start, Liam Lawson reported a technical issue on his Racing Bulls car, although the team was able to resolve the problem in time for him to take his place on the grid. Gabriel Bortoleto was unable to line-up in his original grid position after his Audi stopped at the pit exit, forcing him to start from the pit lane. Polesitter Kimi Antonelli (Mercedes) retained the lead at the start, while Max Verstappen (Red Bull) suffered a power unit-related problem and dropped to the back of the field before retiring at the end of the opening lap. Lewis Hamilton and Charles Leclerc (both Ferrari) moved into second and third, with Isack Hadjar (Red Bull) running fourth. Further back, Pierre Gasly (Alpine) passed Lando Norris (McLaren) on the opening lap. Sergio Pérez (Cadillac) was given a drive-through penalty for being out of position at the start.

Antonelli gradually built a lead over Hamilton and Leclerc during the opening stint, while Hadjar came under pressure from George Russell. Despite Hadjar reporting engine braking and gear-selection issues Russell was unable to pass Hadjar on track and later lost time through penalties, including a drive-through penalty after failing to serve an earlier pit lane speeding penalty correctly. Several drivers also received five-second penalties for speeding in the pit lane, including Hamilton, Russell, Gasly, Franco Colapinto and Oscar Piastri. Mechanical issues removed several cars from contention during the first half of the race, with Valtteri Bottas retiring with brake problems, Oliver Bearman being called into the pits to retire, and Norris retiring after reporting a loss of battery power.

With 22 laps remaining, Lance Stroll (Aston Martin) crashed at the final corner, bringing out the safety car. Several drivers pitted during the interruption, including Hamilton and Piastri, who were able to serve their time penalties. When racing resumed, Leclerc crashed at the same corner, prompting a red flag while officials inspected damage to the track surface. During the stoppage, Gasly received a second five-second penalty for speeding in the pit lane, while Russell was required to serve his drive-through penalty after the restart.

The Grand Prix resumed with a standing restart. Antonelli again held the lead from Hamilton, while Russell briefly moved ahead of Gasly and Hadjar before serving his drive-through penalty and falling out of the points paying positions. Behind them, Carlos Sainz Jr. (Williams) was involved in two collisions shortly after the restart, first with Nico Hülkenberg (Audi) and then with Colapinto, and retired with collision damage. Antonelli went on to win the race ahead of Hamilton, securing his fifth victory of the season and extending his lead in the Drivers' Championship. Gasly finished third on the road, but his two five-second penalties dropped him to seventh, promoting Hadjar to his first podium of the season. Piastri finished fourth, followed by Lawson and Arvid Lindblad, while Alexander Albon, Esteban Ocon and Pérez completed the points positions.

==== Post-race ====
After the race, Pérez received a ten-second time penalty for being out of position at the standing restart following the red flag - the stewards found that the front-right wheel of Pérez's car was outside the starting box. The penalty demoted him from tenth to fifteenth, costing Cadillac what would have been its first Formula One point and promoting Fernando Alonso to tenth, giving Aston Martin its first point of the season.

In line with Formula One regulations, Alpine petitioned for a "right of review" (a kind of appeal) of the two five-second pit lane speeding penalties imposed on Gasly. On 12 June, the stewards upheld Alpine's petition and rescinded both penalties, reinstating Gasly to third place. The stewards' decision stated that pit lane speed was calculated from the time taken between timing loops and the distance between them, and that the applied distance of 2,692 cm (1,060 in) differed from the theoretical shortest distance of 2,615 cm (1,030 in). Using the latter figure, the official timekeeper's calculations gave Gasly's two speeds as 58.7 km/h (36.5 mph) and 58.8 km/h (36.5 mph), below the 60 km/h (37 mph) pit lane speed limit; the stewards therefore determined that Gasly had not exceeded the speed limit.

As a result of the amended classification, Isack Hadjar, Oscar Piastri, Liam Lawson and Arvid Lindblad were all demoted one position. The stewards noted that other drivers had served pit lane speeding penalties during the race, affecting their strategies and results, but stated that the regulations did not give them the power to "undo" a penalty that had already been served, and that no other competitor had petitioned for a right of review within the permitted time frame.

The reversal prompted further controversy and separate procedural challenges. McLaren and Red Bull notified their intention to appeal the decision, while Mercedes explored legal options because George Russell had served a related pit lane speeding penalty during the race and could not have that penalty removed retrospectively. Mercedes subsequently lodged a separate right-of-review petition in relation to Russell, who had also received a drive-through penalty for failing to serve the initial speeding sanction correctly. Mercedes was due to attend a stewards' hearing on 20 June, at which it would first have had to demonstrate the existence of a significant and relevant new element, but withdrew its petition on 18 June before the hearing was held. The withdrawal ended Mercedes's right-of-review proceedings, while McLaren and Red Bull continued with their separate appeal process before the FIA International Court of Appeal. The appeal was heard on 25 August and the final decision made known on 3 September: Gasly's two post race penalties were reinstated, thus promoting Hadjar, Piastri, Lawson and Lindblad one place and demoting Gasly to seventh.

Following the verdict, Alpine said that the team was "unjustly punished" by the decision, while Alpine executive advisor Flavio Briatore alleged that one of the judges, Filippo Marchino, had ties with McLaren. McLaren team principal Andrea Stella and the FIA International Court of Appeal refuted Briatore's claims, with Stella adding that "if anybody makes these kind of allegations – which seem quite serious – they are going to have to take the responsibility for what they are saying in a public forum."

=== Race classification ===
| Pos. | No. | Driver | Constructor | Laps | Time/Retired | Grid | Points |
|---|---|---|---|---|---|---|---|
| 1 | 12 | (Italy) Kimi Antonelli | Mercedes | 78 | 2:23:31.243 | 1 | 25 |
| 2 | 44 | (United Kingdom) Lewis Hamilton | Ferrari | 78 | +6.271 | 3 | 18 |
| 3 | 6 | (France) Isack Hadjar | Red Bull Racing-Red Bull Ford | 78 | +23.394 | 5 | 15 |
| 4 | 81 | (Australia) Oscar Piastri | McLaren-Mercedes | 78 | +24.261 | 7 | 12 |
| 5 | 30 | (New Zealand) Liam Lawson | Racing Bulls-Red Bull Ford | 78 | +26.553 | 10 | 10 |
| 6 | 41 | (United Kingdom) Arvid Lindblad | Racing Bulls-Red Bull Ford | 78 | +29.010 | 15 | 8 |
| 7 | 10 | (France) Pierre Gasly | Alpine-Mercedes | 78 | +30.369^{a} | 9 | 6 |
| 8 | 23 | (Thailand) Alexander Albon | Atlassian Williams-Mercedes | 78 | +33.413 | 11 | 4 |
| 9 | 31 | (France) Esteban Ocon | Haas-Ferrari | 78 | +37.140 | 17 | 2 |
| 10 | 14 | (Spain) Fernando Alonso | Aston Martin Aramco-Honda | 78 | +41.899 | 21 | 1 |
| 11 | 5 | (Brazil) Gabriel Bortoleto | Audi | 78 | +42.748 | PL^{b} | |
| 12 | 63 | (United Kingdom) George Russell | Mercedes | 78 | +43.353 | 6 | |
| 13 | 27 | (Germany) Nico Hülkenberg | Audi | 78 | +44.102^{c} | 13 | |
| 14 | 43 | (Argentina) Franco Colapinto | Alpine-Mercedes | 78 | +48.964^{d} | 14 | |
| 15 | 11 | (Mexico) Sergio Pérez | Cadillac-Ferrari | 78 | +49.153^{e} | 18 | |
| 16^{f} | 55 | (Spain) Carlos Sainz Jr. | Atlassian Williams-Mercedes | 70 | Collision damage | 12 | |
| Ret | 16 | (Monaco) Charles Leclerc | Ferrari | 64 | Accident | 4 | |
| Ret | 18 | (Canada) Lance Stroll | Aston Martin Aramco-Honda | 56 | Accident^{g} | 22 | |
| Ret | 1 | (United Kingdom) Lando Norris | McLaren-Mercedes | 43 | Battery | 8 | |
| Ret | 87 | (United Kingdom) Oliver Bearman | Haas-Ferrari | 27 | Brakes | 19 | |
| Ret | 77 | (Finland) Valtteri Bottas | Cadillac-Ferrari | 15 | Brakes | 20 | |
| Ret | 3 | (Netherlands) Max Verstappen | Red Bull Racing-Red Bull Ford | 0 | Engine | 2 | |

Notes

- ^a – Pierre Gasly finished third, but received two five-second time penalties for speeding in the pit lane. Both penalties were overturned after a right-of-review appeal by Alpine, then later re-instated after appeal by McLaren and Red Bull.
- ^b – Gabriel Bortoleto started from the pit lane as he encountered an issue during a reconnaissance lap.
- ^c – Nico Hülkenberg finished ninth, but received a ten-second time penalty for causing a collision with Carlos Sainz Jr.
- ^d – Franco Colapinto finished 15th, but received a five-second time penalty for speeding in the pit lane. He gained a position following Sergio Pérez's penalty.
- ^e – Sergio Pérez finished 11th on track and was promoted to 10th following Nico Hülkenberg's penalty, but received a post-race ten-second time penalty for being out of position at the restart.
- ^f – Carlos Sainz Jr. was classified as he completed more than 90% of the race distance.
- ^g – Lance Stroll received a five-second time penalty for exceeding track limits. The penalty did not take effect as he retired from the race.

== Championship standings after the race ==
Drivers' Championship standings

| | Pos. | Driver | Points |
|---|---|---|---|
| | 1 | (Italy) Kimi Antonelli | 156 |
| 2 | 2 | (United Kingdom) Lewis Hamilton | 90 |
| 1 | 3 | (United Kingdom) George Russell | 88 |
| 1 | 4 | (Monaco) Charles Leclerc | 75 |
| 1 | 5 | (Australia) Oscar Piastri | 60 |

Constructors' Championship standings

| Pos. | Constructor | Points |
|---|---|---|
| 1 | (Germany) Mercedes | 244 |
| 2 | (Italy) Ferrari | 165 |
| 3 | (United Kingdom) McLaren-Mercedes | 118 |
| 4 | (Austria) Red Bull Racing-Red Bull Ford | 72 |
| 5 | (France) Alpine-Mercedes | 41 |

- Note: Only the top five positions are included for both sets of standings. These are the points standings after all the appeals have been resolved: Alpine's initial right-of-review appeal, when Gasly was credited with third place, and then Gasly's subsequent demotion to 7th following the FIA International Court of Appeal decision in September following McLaren's and Red Bull's appeals.

== See also ==
- 2026 Monte Carlo Formula 2 round
- 2026 Monte Carlo Formula 3 round

== Notes ==
| Previous race: 2026 Canadian Grand Prix | FIA Formula One World Championship; 2026 season | Next race: 2026 Barcelona-Catalunya Grand Prix |
| Previous race: 2025 Monaco Grand Prix | Monaco Grand Prix | Next race: 2027 Monaco Grand Prix |
