= 2026 Italian Grand Prix =

Formula One motor race

Race 13 of 23 in the 2026 Formula One World Championship
← Previous race	Next race →
- Layout of the Autodromo Nazionale di Monza

Race details
- Date: 6 September 2026
- Official name: Formula 1 Pirelli Gran Premio d'Italia 2026
- Location: Monza Circuit; Monza, Italy
- Course: Permanent racing facility
- Course length: 5.793 km (3.600 miles)
- Distance: 53 laps, 306.720 km (190.587 miles)
- Weather: Sunny. Max. ambient temp. 33.9°C, max. track temp. 57.1°C.
- Attendance: 403,666

Pole position
Driver	(France) Pierre Gasly	Alpine-Mercedes
- Time: 1:21.786

Fastest lap
Driver	(Italy) Kimi Antonelli	Mercedes
- Time: 1:23.504 on lap 53

Podium
First	(Italy) Kimi Antonelli	Mercedes
Second	(United Kingdom) George Russell	Mercedes
Third	(Netherlands) Max Verstappen	Red Bull Racing-Red Bull Ford

The 2026 Italian Grand Prix (officially known as the Formula 1 Pirelli Gran Premio d'Italia 2026) was a Formula One motor race that was held on 6 September 2026 at the Monza Circuit in Monza, Italy. It was the thirteenth round of the 2026 Formula One World Championship.

During qualifying, Pierre Gasly (Alpine) achieved his and the team's first pole position. George Russell (Mercedes) battled Max Verstappen (Red Bull) for the lead of the race and went on to control it. However, his teammate Kimi Antonelli, who started in nineteenth position on the grid, overtook him for the lead in the closing stages of the race and went on to win, becoming the first Italian driver to win on home soil since Riccardo Patrese won the 1990 San Marino Grand Prix. Russell settled for second, with Verstappen completing the podium.

== Background ==
The event was held at the Monza Circuit in Monza for the 76th time in the circuit's history, across the weekend of 4–6 September. The Grand Prix was the thirteenth round of the 2026 Formula One World Championship and the 77th running of the Italian Grand Prix as a round of the Formula One World Championship. Ferrari and Haas both brought significant upgrade packages for the event.

=== Championship standings before the race ===
Going into the weekend, Kimi Antonelli led the Drivers' Championship with 242 points, 59 points ahead of teammate George Russell in second and 59 ahead of Lewis Hamilton in third. Mercedes, with 425 points, led the Constructors' Championship from Ferrari and McLaren, who were second and third with 338 and 265 points, respectively.

=== Entrants ===
The drivers and teams were the same as published in the season entry list, with the exception of Isack Hadjar at Red Bull, who injured his wrist leading into the preceding Dutch Grand Prix and was unable to compete. He was again replaced by Liam Lawson. Red Bull reserve driver Yuki Tsunoda replaced Lawson at Racing Bulls. During the first practice session, four teams fielded alternate drivers who had not raced in more than two Grands Prix, as required by the Formula One regulations:

- Luke Browning for Williams in place of Alexander Albon.
- Paul Aron for Alpine in place of Pierre Gasly.
- Ayumu Iwasa for Red Bull in place of Max Verstappen.
- Colton Herta for Cadillac in place of Sergio Pérez.

=== Tyre choices ===
Tyre supplier Pirelli selected the C3, C4, and C5 tyre compounds—the softest three in its range, designated hard, medium, and soft, respectively—for teams to use at the event.

== Practice ==
Three free practice sessions were held for the event. The first practice session was held on 4 September 2026, at 12:30 local time (UTC+2), and was topped by Charles Leclerc (Ferrari) ahead of his teammate Lewis Hamilton and George Russell (Mercedes). The second practice session was held on the same day, at 16:00 local time, and was topped by Russell ahead of Leclerc and Russell's teammate Kimi Antonelli. The third practice session was held on 5 September 2026, at 12:30 local time, and was topped by Russell ahead of Hamilton and Max Verstappen (Red Bull).

== Qualifying ==
Qualifying was held on 5 September 2026, at 16:00 local time (UTC+2), and determined the starting grid order for the race.

=== Qualifying report ===
Qualifying was held in dry conditions. Liam Lawson (Red Bull) was the first to leave the pit lane at the start of Q1 and set the initial benchmark. He was followed by Lance Stroll (Aston Martin) and Oliver Bearman (Haas). The Ferrari drivers moved into first and second place, with Charles Leclerc setting the fastest time, followed by Lewis Hamilton. Max Verstappen (Red Bull) then topped the timesheets. He was quickly displaced by Pierre Gasly (Alpine), who remained at the top for the rest of Q1, with his teammate, Franco Colapinto, in third. Nico Hülkenberg (Audi) improved late in the session to claim a position in the second part of qualifying (Q2). Yuki Tsunoda (Racing Bulls) was the fastest driver eliminated, ahead of Alexander Albon (Williams). Both Cadillac drivers, Valtteri Bottas and Sergio Pérez, also failed to progress alongside Stroll and Fernando Alonso (Aston Martin).

Lawson once again led the field out at the start of Q2 and briefly set the pace before Verstappen established the first representative benchmark. McLaren then assumed control for most of the segment, with Oscar Piastri in first place and Lando Norris in second. It was during the final round of laps that Piastri impeded Lawson, resulting in his three-place grid-penalty for the race. Antonelli moved to the top of the timesheets following his flying lap. Hamilton improved to tenth, beating Gabriel Bortoleto (Audi) by 0.001 seconds. Oliver Bearman (Haas) qualified twelfth, followed by Lawson, Hülkenberg, Carlos Sainz Jr. (Williams) and Esteban Ocon (Haas).

The Mercedes drivers were the first on the track in Q3. George Russell set the first timed lap after being given a tow by Kimi Antonelli early in the lap. Piastri held second after the opening runs, ahead of Gasly, Leclerc, Verstappen, Antonelli, Norris, Arvid Lindblad (Racing Bulls), Hamilton and Colapinto. Hamilton and Colapinto moved to fifth and seventh respectively in their final attempt. Russell briefly took provisional pole, before being displaced by Gasly. None of the other drivers improved on their times.

This was Gasly's first career pole. It made him the first French driver to take one since Jean Alesi at the 1997 Italian Grand Prix, driving for Benetton. This was Team Enstone's first pole position as Alpine and their first since the Alonso took pole at the 2009 Hungarian Grand Prix - when they competed as Renault.

=== Qualifying classification ===
Pos.	No.	Driver	Constructor	Qualifying times			Final grid
Pos.	No.	Driver	Constructor	Q1	Q2	Q3	Final grid
1	10	(France) Pierre Gasly	Alpine-Mercedes	1:22.612	1:22.077	1:21.786	1
2	63	(United Kingdom) George Russell	Mercedes	1:22.779	1:22.161	1:21.846	2
3	81	(Australia) Oscar Piastri	McLaren-Mercedes	1:22.924	1:22.017	1:21.966	6^{a}
4	16	(Monaco) Charles Leclerc	Ferrari	1:22.902	1:22.509	1:22.004	3
5	44	(United Kingdom) Lewis Hamilton	Ferrari	1:22.847	1:22.516	1:22.011	4
6	3	(Netherlands) Max Verstappen	Red Bull Racing-Red Bull Ford	1:22.631	1:22.188	1:22.070	5
7	12	(Italy) Kimi Antonelli	Mercedes	1:22.758	1:21.882	1:22.093	19^{b}
8	43	(Argentina) Franco Colapinto	Alpine-Mercedes	1:22.662	1:22.400	1:22.220	7
9	1	(United Kingdom) Lando Norris	McLaren-Mercedes	1:22.659	1:22.067	1:22.256	8
10	41	(United Kingdom) Arvid Lindblad	Racing Bulls-Red Bull Ford	1:22.727	1:22.345	1:22.286	9
11	5	(Brazil) Gabriel Bortoleto	Audi	1:22.946	1:22.517	N/A	10
12	87	(United Kingdom) Oliver Bearman	Haas-Ferrari	1:22.906	1:22.756	N/A	11
13	27	(Germany) Nico Hülkenberg	Audi	1:23.440	1:22.779	N/A	12
14	30	(New Zealand) Liam Lawson	Red Bull Racing-Red Bull Ford	1:22.989	1:22.821	N/A	PL^{c}
15	55	(Spain) Carlos Sainz Jr.	Atlassian Williams-Mercedes	1:23.616	1:23.453	N/A	13
16	31	(France) Esteban Ocon	Haas-Ferrari	1:23.466	1:23.454	N/A	14
17	22	(Japan) Yuki Tsunoda	Racing Bulls-Red Bull Ford	1:23.755	N/A	N/A	15
18	23	(Thailand) Alexander Albon	Atlassian Williams-Mercedes	1:24.356	N/A	N/A	20^{d}
19	77	(Finland) Valtteri Bottas	Cadillac-Ferrari	1:24.364	N/A	N/A	16
20	11	(Mexico) Sergio Pérez	Cadillac-Ferrari	1:24.595	N/A	N/A	17
21	14	(Spain) Fernando Alonso	Aston Martin Aramco-Honda	1:25.150	N/A	N/A	PL^{e}
22	18	(Canada) Lance Stroll	Aston Martin Aramco-Honda	1:25.222	N/A	N/A	18
107% time: 1:28.394

Notes

- ^a – Oscar Piastri received a three-place grid penalty for impeding Liam Lawson in Q2.
- ^b – Kimi Antonelli received a 30-place grid penalty for exceeding his quota of power unit elements.
- ^c – Liam Lawson received a 35-place grid penalty for exceeding his quota of power unit elements. He was required to start the race from the pit lane as his car was modified under parc fermé conditions.
- ^d – Alexander Albon received a 20-place grid penalty for exceeding his quota of power unit elements.
- ^e – Fernando Alonso qualified 21st, but was required to start the race from the pit lane as his car was modified under parc fermé conditions.

== Race ==
The race was held on 6 September 2026, at 15:00 local time (UTC+2), and was run for 53 laps.

=== Race report ===
The 53-lap race took place in hot and dry conditions. Twenty drivers lined up on the grid, while Fernando Alonso (Aston Martin) and Liam Lawson (Red Bull) starting from the pit lane following set up changes to their cars. Pole-sitter Pierre Gasly (Alpine) was joined on the front row by George Russell, with Charles Leclerc and Lewis Hamilton (both Ferrari) on the second row. Oscar Piastri (McLaren) started sixth following a three-place grid penalty following qualifying, alongside Max Verstappen (Red Bull) who had subsequently been promoted to fifth. Kimi Antonelli (Mercedes), Alonso and Yuki Tsunoda (Racing Bulls) began on hard-compound tyres, with the remainder of the grid almost equally split between the mediums and softs.

Gasly held the lead until the second lap, when Russell overtook him to take first place. Behind them, Verstappen overtook Leclerc, Hamilton dropped to tenth and Oliver Bearman (Haas) moved to ninth. Leclerc then ran over a drainage grill, spun out and crashed into the barrier at the Parabolica. Before the double yellows were waved, Franco Colapinto (Alpine) passed Piastri for fourth. Antonelli managed to make seven places during this time. The race was red-flagged for approximately half an hour at the end of the third lap as the barrier was repaired, after which the race resumed with a standing start. Tsunoda positioned his car at an angle inside his grid box at the end of the second formation lap, with the race director choosing to declare another formation lap.

After the restart, Colapinto briefly reached third before losing numerous places after going off-track. Verstappen, Hamilton, Piastri and Antonelli overtook Gasly between laps 7 and 11, leaving him in sixth. Tsunoda made up five places, moving from fourteenth to ninth by lap 15. Antonelli took the lead on lap 18, with Russell briefly overtaking him on lap 20, before Antonelli moved back in front. Russell moved back into the lead on lap 23. Alonso retired from the Grand Prix two laps later. Lance Stroll also retired after his car stopped at the first chicane on lap 28. This caused a virtual safety car that led to Antonelli, Verstappen, Carlos Sainz Jr. (Williams), Esteban Ocon (Haas), Sergio Pérez and Valtteri Bottas (both Cadillac) coming into the pits. Prior to this, Verstappen and Antonelli both were within two seconds of race leader George Russell. Russell stayed out. With Antonelli's significant tyre offset and pace advantage, he was able to catch up to Russell by the closing stages of the race. His first attempt to pass him at the first chicane was unsuccessful, with Antonelli being sent into the gravel, though he was later able to pass Russell. Concurrently, both McLarens were also squabbling for fourth; Norris took the position after passing his teammate. Antonelli won the race after starting nineteenth. With this victory, Antonelli became the first driver since John Watson at the 1983 United States Grand Prix West to win from 19th or lower and became the first Italian driver to win on home soil since Riccardo Patrese in 1990, (Note: Ricardo Patrese won the 1990 San Marino Grand Prix, held in Imola, Emilia-Romagna) and the first to win the Italian Grand Prix since Ludovico Scarfiotti in 1966.

=== Race classification ===
Pos.	No.	Driver	Constructor	Laps	Time/Retired	Grid	Points
1	12	(Italy) Kimi Antonelli	Mercedes	53	1:51:15.281	19	25
2	63	(United Kingdom) George Russell	Mercedes	53	+3.857	2	18
3	3	(Netherlands) Max Verstappen	Red Bull Racing-Red Bull Ford	53	+14.718	5	15
4	1	(United Kingdom) Lando Norris	McLaren-Mercedes	53	+19.056	8	12
5	81	(Australia) Oscar Piastri	McLaren-Mercedes	53	+19.253	6	10
6	44	(United Kingdom) Lewis Hamilton	Ferrari	53	+24.655	4	8
7	10	(France) Pierre Gasly	Alpine-Mercedes	53	+27.351	1	6
8	41	(United Kingdom) Arvid Lindblad	Racing Bulls-Red Bull Ford	53	+45.136	9	4
9	43	(Argentina) Franco Colapinto	Alpine-Mercedes	53	+47.353	7	2
10	22	(Japan) Yuki Tsunoda	Racing Bulls-Red Bull Ford	53	+58.187	15	1
11	5	(Brazil) Gabriel Bortoleto	Audi	53	+1:05.187	10	
12	27	(Germany) Nico Hülkenberg	Audi	53	+1:06.187	12	
13	55	(Spain) Carlos Sainz Jr.	Atlassian Williams-Mercedes	53	+1:14.117	13	
14	30	(New Zealand) Liam Lawson	Red Bull Racing-Red Bull Ford	53	+1:15.609	PL	
15	87	(United Kingdom) Oliver Bearman	Haas-Ferrari	53	+1:18.958	11	
16	31	(France) Esteban Ocon	Haas-Ferrari	52	+1 lap	14	
17	23	(Thailand) Alexander Albon	Atlassian Williams-Mercedes	52	+1 lap	20	
18	11	(Mexico) Sergio Pérez	Cadillac-Ferrari	52	+1 lap^{a}	17	
19	77	(Finland) Valtteri Bottas	Cadillac-Ferrari	51	+2 laps	16	
Ret	18	(Canada) Lance Stroll	Aston Martin Aramco-Honda	26	Hydraulics	18	
Ret	14	(Spain) Fernando Alonso	Aston Martin Aramco-Honda	23	Mechanical	PL	
Ret	16	(Monaco) Charles Leclerc	Ferrari	1	Accident	3	

Notes

- ^a – Sergio Pérez received a five-second time penalty for failing to follow the race director's instructions. His final position was not affected by the penalty.

== Championship standings after the race ==
Drivers' Championship standings

Pos.	Driver	Points
1	(Italy) Kimi Antonelli	267
2	(United Kingdom) George Russell	201
3	(United Kingdom) Lewis Hamilton	191
4	(United Kingdom) Lando Norris	171
5	(Monaco) Charles Leclerc	155

Constructors' Championship standings

Pos.	Constructor	Points
1	(Germany) Mercedes	468
2	(Italy) Ferrari	346
3	(United Kingdom) McLaren-Mercedes	287
4	(Austria) Red Bull Racing-Red Bull Ford	204
5	(Italy) Racing Bulls-Red Bull Ford	75

- Note: Only the top five positions are included for both sets of standings.

== See also ==
- 2026 Monza Formula 2 round

Previous race: 2026 Dutch Grand Prix	FIA Formula One World Championship; 2026 season	Next race: 2026 Spanish Grand Prix
Previous race: 2025 Italian Grand Prix	Italian Grand Prix	Next race: 2027 Italian Grand Prix
