= 2026 Dutch Grand Prix =

Formula One motor race

Race 12 of 23 in the 2026 Formula One World Championship
← Previous race	Next race →
- Layout of Circuit Zandvoort

Race details
- Date: 23 August 2026
- Official name: Formula 1 Heineken Dutch Grand Prix 2026
- Location: Circuit Zandvoort; Zandvoort, Netherlands
- Course: Permanent racing facility
- Course length: 4.259 km (2.646 miles)
- Distance: 72 laps, 306.592 km (190.510 miles)
- Weather: Partly cloudy. Max. ambient temp. 20.4°C, max. track temp. 38.2°C.
- Attendance: 325,000

Pole position
Driver	(United Kingdom) Lando Norris	McLaren-Mercedes
- Time: 1:11.163

Fastest lap
Driver	(Monaco) Charles Leclerc	Ferrari
- Time: 1:14.230 on lap 60

Podium
First	(United Kingdom) Lando Norris	McLaren-Mercedes
Second	(Italy) Kimi Antonelli	Mercedes
Third	(United Kingdom) George Russell	Mercedes

The 2026 Dutch Grand Prix (officially known as the Formula 1 Heineken Dutch Grand Prix 2026) was a Formula One motor race held on 23 August 2026 at Circuit Zandvoort in Zandvoort, the Netherlands. It was the twelfth round of the 2026 Formula One World Championship and the fifth of six Grands Prix in the season to utilise the sprint format. The event was the final scheduled running of the Dutch Grand Prix before its departure from the Formula One calendar.

George Russell (Mercedes) secured pole position for the sprint and converted it into victory ahead of Charles Leclerc (Ferrari) and Lando Norris (McLaren). Norris took pole position for the main race, ahead of Russell and Kimi Antonelli (Mercedes). The race began on a damp circuit following pre-race rain and was red-flagged at the end of the opening lap after Max Verstappen (Red Bull) lost control at the banked final corner and crashed heavily. Antonelli overtook Norris for the lead at the standing restart and led for much of the race, Norris extended his penultimate stint to gain a tyre-life advantage. After rejoining behind Antonelli and the out-of-sequence Lewis Hamilton (Ferrari), Norris overtook both drivers on lap 54 and retained the lead. He won ahead of Antonelli and Russell, securing his second consecutive victory following the Hungarian Grand Prix, the thirteenth victory of his Formula One career and his second at Zandvoort.

== Background ==
The event was held at Circuit Zandvoort in Zandvoort for the 36th time in the circuit's history, across the weekend of 21–23 August. It was the 36th running of the Dutch Grand Prix as a round of the Formula One World Championship. It was also the fifth of six Grands Prix in the season to utilise the sprint format and the first time that the Dutch Grand Prix featured it. This was the last scheduled Dutch Grand Prix, after the promoter elected against extending the contract in 2027.

=== Championship standings before the race ===
Following the previous round in Hungary, Kimi Antonelli led the Drivers' Championship with 219 points, 50 points ahead of Lewis Hamilton in second and 59 ahead of his teammate George Russell in third. Mercedes, with 379 points, led the Constructors' Championship from Ferrari and McLaren, which were second and third with 307 and 220 points, respectively.

=== Entrants ===
The drivers and teams were the same as published in the season entry list, with the exception of Isack Hadjar at Red Bull, who injured his wrist leading into the weekend and was therefore unable to compete. He was replaced by Liam Lawson, marking his first appearance with Red Bull since the 2025 Chinese Grand Prix. Red Bull reserve driver Yuki Tsunoda, who last raced at the 2025 Abu Dhabi Grand Prix as a Red Bull driver, replaced Lawson at Racing Bulls, his first appearance for Racing Bulls since swapping seats with Lawson after the first two rounds of 2025.

=== Tyre choices ===
Tyre supplier Pirelli selected its C2, C3, and C4 compounds—the middle three in its range—for the event, designating them as hard, medium, and soft, respectively.

== Practice ==
The sole free practice session was held on 21 August 2026, at 12:30 local time (UTC+2), and was topped by Kimi Antonelli (Mercedes) ahead of Lando Norris (McLaren) and teammate George Russell.

== Sprint qualifying ==
Sprint qualifying was held on 21 August 2026, at 16:30 local time (UTC+2), and determined the starting grid order for the sprint.

=== Sprint qualifying report ===
The 12-minute opening segment (SQ1) saw the medium compound tyres mandated. Kimi Antonelli and George Russell (Mercedes) set the opening timed laps. Antonelli carried too much speed into the penultimate corner on his first flying lap, lost the rear of his car and travelled through the gravel before returning to the pits. Although Mercedes initially reported that no damage was visible, Antonelli later revealed that the excursion had left holes in the floor and caused a substantial loss of downforce; the Mercedes mechanics repaired the floor sufficiently for him to continue, and he recovered to finish SQ1 in eighth place. Russell established the early benchmark before Charles Leclerc, Lewis Hamilton (Ferrari) and Lando Norris (McLaren) successively moved to the top. Leclerc ultimately finished SQ1 fastest, ahead of Norris, Oscar Piastri (McLaren), Hamilton and Russell. Liam Lawson (Red Bull), who had returned to the team in place of the injured Isack Hadjar, took sixth ahead of teammate Max Verstappen. At the other end of the order, Fernando Alonso (Aston Martin) locked his brakes at turn 1 and ran wide, while a malfunction of his car's straight-line mode contributed to him finishing last, despite receiving a tow from a Cadillac. Late improvements by Esteban Ocon (Haas) and Alexander Albon (Williams) displaced their respective teammates Oliver Bearman (Haas) and Carlos Sainz Jr. (Williams), who were eliminated in 17th and 18th, respectively. Lance Stroll (Aston Martin), the Cadillac drivers Valtteri Bottas and Sergio Pérez, and Alonso were also eliminated.

SQ2 (the second part of sprint qualifying) was again contested on medium tyres. Norris initially moved to the top before Piastri produced the fastest lap of the segment. Leclerc and Hamilton subsequently improved, but neither Ferrari nor the Mercedes drivers could displace Piastri. Ferrari and Mercedes returned to the pits after completing their runs, whereas McLaren remained on track and ended the segment first and second, with Leclerc third ahead of Russell, Hamilton and Antonelli. Pierre Gasly (Alpine), Verstappen, Arvid Lindblad (Racing Bulls) and Gabriel Bortoleto (Audi) secured the remaining four places in the final part of sprint qualifying (SQ3). Bortoleto's final improvement lifted him into the top ten and displaced Lawson into the elimination zone. Lawson finished 11th after failing to make the same improvement as the other drivers as track conditions evolved, narrowly ahead of Yuki Tsunoda (Racing Bulls), who had taken Lawson's regular seat for the weekend. Franco Colapinto (Alpine), Nico Hülkenberg (Audi), Ocon and Albon completed the group eliminated before SQ3.

The final eight-minute SQ3 segment was run on soft tyres and became a one-lap shootout, with all ten drivers remaining in their garages until the closing four minutes. Norris was the first to complete a representative lap and took provisional sprint pole. Antonelli was unable to improve on Norris's effort, Russell moved ahead. Leclerc subsequently qualified third ahead of Piastri, leaving the four fastest drivers separated by less than one tenth of a second. Antonelli finished fifth, with the earlier floor damage continuing to affect his performance. Verstappen qualified sixth, while Hamilton encountered oversteer at turn 1 and difficulty rotating his Ferrari through turn 9 on his way to seventh. Gasly headed the midfield runners in eighth, followed by Bortoleto and Lindblad. Russell had finished fifth in SQ1 and fourth in SQ2 without leading either segment, but secured his third sprint pole position of the season.

=== Sprint qualifying classification ===
Pos.	No.	Driver	Constructor	Qualifying times			Sprint grid
Pos.	No.	Driver	Constructor	SQ1	SQ2	SQ3	Sprint grid
1	63	(United Kingdom) George Russell	Mercedes	1:13.278	1:12.235	1:11.567	1
2	1	(United Kingdom) Lando Norris	McLaren-Mercedes	1:13.071	1:12.189	1:11.608	2
3	16	(Monaco) Charles Leclerc	Ferrari	1:13.011	1:12.190	1:11.622	3
4	81	(Australia) Oscar Piastri	McLaren-Mercedes	1:13.126	1:12.026	1:11.666	4
5	12	(Italy) Kimi Antonelli	Mercedes	1:13.668	1:12.511	1:11.794	5
6	3	(Netherlands) Max Verstappen	Red Bull Racing-Red Bull Ford	1:13.585	1:12.771	1:12.094	6
7	44	(United Kingdom) Lewis Hamilton	Ferrari	1:13.151	1:12.445	1:12.191	7
8	10	(France) Pierre Gasly	Alpine-Mercedes	1:13.977	1:12.720	1:12.578	8
9	5	(Brazil) Gabriel Bortoleto	Audi	1:13.730	1:12.786	1:12.583	9
10	41	(United Kingdom) Arvid Lindblad	Racing Bulls-Red Bull Ford	1:14.057	1:12.785	1:12.737	10
11	30	(New Zealand) Liam Lawson	Red Bull Racing-Red Bull Ford	1:13.420	1:13.136	N/A	11
12	22	(Japan) Yuki Tsunoda	Racing Bulls-Red Bull Ford	1:14.490	1:13.145	N/A	12
13	43	(Argentina) Franco Colapinto	Alpine-Mercedes	1:14.618	1:13.439	N/A	13
14	27	(Germany) Nico Hülkenberg	Audi	1:14.284	1:13.616	N/A	14
15	31	(France) Esteban Ocon	Haas-Ferrari	1:14.503	1:13.893	N/A	15
16	23	(Thailand) Alexander Albon	Atlassian Williams-Mercedes	1:14.596	1:14.294	N/A	16
17	87	(United Kingdom) Oliver Bearman	Haas-Ferrari	1:14.728	N/A	N/A	17
18	55	(Spain) Carlos Sainz Jr.	Atlassian Williams-Mercedes	1:14.738	N/A	N/A	PL^{a}
19	18	(Canada) Lance Stroll	Aston Martin Aramco-Honda	1:15.391	N/A	N/A	18
20	77	(Finland) Valtteri Bottas	Cadillac-Ferrari	1:15.472	N/A	N/A	19
21	11	(Mexico) Sergio Pérez	Cadillac-Ferrari	1:15.545	N/A	N/A	20
22	14	(Spain) Fernando Alonso	Aston Martin Aramco-Honda	1:16.014	N/A	N/A	PL^{b}
107% time: 1:18.121

Notes

- ^a – Carlos Sainz Jr. qualified 18th, but was required to start the sprint from the pit lane as his car was modified under parc fermé conditions.
- ^b – Fernando Alonso qualified 22nd, but was required to start the sprint from the pit lane as his car was modified under parc fermé conditions.

== Sprint ==
The sprint was held on 22 August 2026, at 12:00 local time (UTC+2), and was run for 24 laps.

=== Sprint report ===
George Russell (Mercedes) started from pole position, with Lando Norris (McLaren) alongside him and Charles Leclerc (Ferrari) and Oscar Piastri (McLaren) on the second row. Before the start, Carlos Sainz Jr. (Williams) and Fernando Alonso (Aston Martin) were required to begin from the pit lane after their teams made set up changes under parc fermé conditions. A technical problem on Sergio Pérez's (Cadillac) car was discovered before the formation lap, prompting the team to return it to the pit lane and leaving his grid position vacant. The sprint began in dry and overcast conditions, with most drivers using the medium compound tyres; Leclerc and Oliver Bearman (Haas) were the only drivers to select the soft compound.

Russell retained the lead at the start and resisted Norris's initial challenge. Behind them, Kimi Antonelli (Mercedes) swept around Piastri through the opening corners to take fourth place, the only change of position among the top ten on the opening lap, while Leclerc remained close behind Norris and Max Verstappen (Red Bull) followed by Piastri in sixth. Further back, Franco Colapinto (Alpine) passed Yuki Tsunoda (Racing Bulls) for twelfth, while Pérez joined the sprint from the pit lane after three laps. Nico Hülkenberg (Audi) encountered a power unit problem during the early stages and returned to the pits; although he later rejoined the track, he completed too few laps to be classified.

Norris remained within range of Russell during the opening laps, as Russell conserved his tyres through the high-speed corners. On lap 10, Mercedes told Russell that he could increase his pace, after which he opened a more secure advantage over Norris. Norris began to struggle with rear grip and came under sustained pressure from Leclerc, whose soft tyres continued to perform without the anticipated loss of pace, while Antonelli remained close behind. The order also remained closely contested further back: Piastri held off Verstappen for fifth, with Lewis Hamilton (Ferrari) behind, while Pierre Gasly (Alpine) defended the final points-paying position from Gabriel Bortoleto (Audi). Arvid Lindblad (Racing Bulls) stayed ahead of Liam Lawson (Red Bull) in the contest for tenth. Despite several cars running within overtaking range, the narrow circuit and the similar pace of the leading group limited changes of position.

On lap 18, Leclerc successfully overtook Norris around the outside of the first turn. Leclerc pulled away once ahead, while Russell increased his pace sufficiently to retain control of the sprint. Norris then came under pressure from Antonelli, who attempted to challenge into the first corner on the final lap but was unable to complete a pass. Piastri similarly resisted Verstappen for fifth, while Hamilton remained seventh and Gasly secured the final point in eighth. Russell won, giving him his third sprint victory of the season, ahead of Leclerc and Norris. Antonelli finished fourth and extended his championship lead over Hamilton to 53 points, while Russell reduced his deficit to Antonelli to 56 points.

=== Sprint classification ===
Pos.	No.	Driver	Constructor	Laps	Time/Retired	Grid	Points
1	63	(United Kingdom) George Russell	Mercedes	24	30:25.318	1	8
2	16	(Monaco) Charles Leclerc	Ferrari	24	+1.360	3	7
3	1	(United Kingdom) Lando Norris	McLaren-Mercedes	24	+5.196	2	6
4	12	(Italy) Kimi Antonelli	Mercedes	24	+5.581	5	5
5	81	(Australia) Oscar Piastri	McLaren-Mercedes	24	+10.185	4	4
6	3	(Netherlands) Max Verstappen	Red Bull Racing-Red Bull Ford	24	+10.529	6	3
7	44	(United Kingdom) Lewis Hamilton	Ferrari	24	+12.188	7	2
8	10	(France) Pierre Gasly	Alpine-Mercedes	24	+42.510	8	1
9	5	(Brazil) Gabriel Bortoleto	Audi	24	+44.437	9	
10	41	(United Kingdom) Arvid Lindblad	Racing Bulls-Red Bull Ford	24	+44.971	10	
11	30	(New Zealand) Liam Lawson	Red Bull Racing-Red Bull Ford	24	+47.471	11	
12	43	(Argentina) Franco Colapinto	Alpine-Mercedes	24	+54.466	13	
13	22	(Japan) Yuki Tsunoda	Racing Bulls-Red Bull Ford	24	+56.483	12	
14	31	(France) Esteban Ocon	Haas-Ferrari	24	+1:06.098	15	
15	87	(United Kingdom) Oliver Bearman	Haas-Ferrari	24	+1:06.588	17	
16	23	(Thailand) Alexander Albon	Atlassian Williams-Mercedes	24	+1:14.632	16	
17	18	(Canada) Lance Stroll	Aston Martin Aramco-Honda	24	+1:14.650	18	
18	14	(Spain) Fernando Alonso	Aston Martin Aramco-Honda	24	+1:15.284	PL	
19	77	(Finland) Valtteri Bottas	Cadillac-Ferrari	23	+1 lap	19	
20	55	(Spain) Carlos Sainz Jr.	Atlassian Williams-Mercedes	23	+1 lap	PL	
21	11	(Mexico) Sergio Pérez	Cadillac-Ferrari	21	+3 laps	PL^{a}	
NC^{b}	27	(Germany) Nico Hülkenberg	Audi	7	+17 laps	14	

Notes

- ^a – Sergio Pérez started the sprint from the pit lane due to a technical issue. His place on the grid was left vacant.
- ^b – Nico Hülkenberg was not classified as he did not complete 90% of the sprint distance.

== Qualifying ==
Qualifying was held on 22 August 2026, at 16:00 local time (UTC+2), and determined the starting grid order for the main race.

=== Qualifying report ===
Q1, the opening part of qualifying, began on a dry track, with all drivers using the soft-compound tyre. Nico Hülkenberg (Audi) led the field out of the pit lane, before Yuki Tsunoda (Racing Bulls) set the early pace. Lewis Hamilton (Ferrari) then moved to the top, only to be displaced in turn by Lando Norris and Oscar Piastri (both McLaren). George Russell (Mercedes) initially split the McLarens, while Hamilton briefly went through the gravel after locking up at turn 1. Gabriel Bortoleto (Audi) recovered from an error on his first attempt to move clear of the elimination zone, and Piastri ultimately headed Hamilton and Norris, with less than a tenth of a second covering the leading three. Alexander Albon (Williams) secured the final place in Q2 (the second part of qualifying) by little more than two hundredths of a second over Carlos Sainz Jr. (Williams), who was eliminated alongside Fernando Alonso and Lance Stroll (both Aston Martin), Oliver Bearman (Haas), and Valtteri Bottas and Sergio Pérez (both Cadillac).

Max Verstappen (Red Bull) led the field out at the start of Q2 and briefly set the pace before Russell established the first representative benchmark. McLaren then assumed control as the track evolved, with Norris narrowly beating Piastri to finish the segment fastest. Bortoleto's improvement into the top ten increased the pressure on the Red Bull drivers (Verstappen and Liam Lawson), and, with the leading 13 cars covered by approximately one second, every remaining driver completed a second run. Verstappen improved to third, ahead of Charles Leclerc (Ferrari), Kimi Antonelli (Mercedes), Russell and Hamilton, while Lawson advanced in eighth. Bortoleto and Arvid Lindblad (Racing Bulls) retained the final two places in Q3 (the final part of qualifying). Pierre Gasly (Alpine) was the fastest driver eliminated, missing Lindblad's time by less than a tenth of a second; he was followed by Tsunoda, Hülkenberg, Franco Colapinto (Alpine), Esteban Ocon (Haas) and Albon.

The threat of rain influenced the timing of the Q3 runs. Norris held provisional pole by more than a tenth of a second after the opening attempts, with Russell separating the McLaren drivers and Piastri in third; Leclerc was fourth ahead of Antonelli, Verstappen and Lawson, while Hamilton was eighth. As the first drops began to fall, the drivers returned to the circuit earlier than usual for their final attempts. Antonelli briefly took provisional pole, before Norris immediately surpassed him; Russell then improved to second, just over a tenth of a second behind Norris, with Antonelli third and Piastri fourth. Only four hundredths of a second separated Russell, Antonelli and Piastri. Ferrari's drivers were the last of the leading contenders to complete their laps, but neither challenged for pole; Hamilton moved ahead of Leclerc to form an all-Ferrari third row. Verstappen and Lawson occupied the fourth row, while Bortoleto and Lindblad completed the top ten. This marked Norris's second consecutive pole position and the 18th Grand Prix pole of his career.

=== Qualifying classification ===
Pos.	No.	Driver	Constructor	Qualifying times			Final grid
Pos.	No.	Driver	Constructor	Q1	Q2	Q3	Final grid
1	1	(United Kingdom) Lando Norris	McLaren-Mercedes	1:12.695	1:11.628	1:11.163	1
2	63	(United Kingdom) George Russell	Mercedes	1:12.924	1:11.959	1:11.265	2
3	12	(Italy) Kimi Antonelli	Mercedes	1:13.022	1:11.915	1:11.296	3
4	81	(Australia) Oscar Piastri	McLaren-Mercedes	1:12.610	1:11.641	1:11.305	4
5	44	(United Kingdom) Lewis Hamilton	Ferrari	1:12.673	1:11.970	1:11.494	5
6	16	(Monaco) Charles Leclerc	Ferrari	1:13.064	1:11.910	1:11.558	6
7	3	(Netherlands) Max Verstappen	Red Bull Racing-Red Bull Ford	1:13.290	1:11.874	1:11.618	7
8	30	(New Zealand) Liam Lawson	Red Bull Racing-Red Bull Ford	1:13.392	1:12.301	1:11.733	8
9	5	(Brazil) Gabriel Bortoleto	Audi	1:13.142	1:12.433	1:12.079	9
10	41	(United Kingdom) Arvid Lindblad	Racing Bulls-Red Bull Ford	1:13.074	1:12.525	1:12.185	10
11	10	(France) Pierre Gasly	Alpine-Mercedes	1:13.115	1:12.616	N/A	11
12	22	(Japan) Yuki Tsunoda	Racing Bulls-Red Bull Ford	1:13.085	1:12.627	N/A	12
13	27	(Germany) Nico Hülkenberg	Audi	1:13.188	1:12.797	N/A	13
14	43	(Argentina) Franco Colapinto	Alpine-Mercedes	1:13.322	1:12.800	N/A	14
15	31	(France) Esteban Ocon	Haas-Ferrari	1:13.544	1:13.137	N/A	15
16	23	(Thailand) Alexander Albon	Atlassian Williams-Mercedes	1:13.552	1:13.182	N/A	16
17	55	(Spain) Carlos Sainz Jr.	Atlassian Williams-Mercedes	1:13.574	N/A	N/A	17
18	14	(Spain) Fernando Alonso	Aston Martin Aramco-Honda	1:13.650	N/A	N/A	18
19	18	(Canada) Lance Stroll	Aston Martin Aramco-Honda	1:13.818	N/A	N/A	19
20	87	(United Kingdom) Oliver Bearman	Haas-Ferrari	1:13.826	N/A	N/A	20
21	77	(Finland) Valtteri Bottas	Cadillac-Ferrari	1:14.371	N/A	N/A	21
22	11	(Mexico) Sergio Pérez	Cadillac-Ferrari	1:14.600	N/A	N/A	PL^{a}
107% time: 1:17.692

Notes

- ^a – Sergio Pérez qualified 22nd, but was required to start the race from the pit lane as his car was modified under parc fermé conditions.

== Race ==
The race was held on 23 August 2026 at 15:00 local time (UTC+2) and was run for 72 laps.

=== Race report ===
==== Pre-race ====
Heavy rain fell at Zandvoort during the hour preceding the race, leaving parts of the circuit damp and making the choice between slick and intermediate-wet tyres uncertain. The rain had stopped by the time the pit lane opened, and the field elected to start on dry-weather tyres. Pole-sitter Lando Norris (McLaren) was joined on the front row by George Russell (Mercedes), with Kimi Antonelli (Mercedes) and Oscar Piastri (McLaren) on the second row. Sergio Pérez (Cadillac) was required to start from the pit lane after suspension set-up changes were made to his car under parc fermé conditions. Norris, Russell, Antonelli and Piastri selected the medium compound for the start, as did Pierre Gasly (Alpine), Franco Colapinto (Alpine) and Esteban Ocon (Haas). Most of the remaining drivers chose soft tyres, while both Cadillac drivers started on hards. Owing to the circuit remaining partly wet, the formation lap was conducted behind the safety car, after which the cars lined up for a standing start.

==== Start and red flag ====
Norris retained the lead at the start, while Antonelli passed Russell to take second place. Behind them, Charles Leclerc (Ferrari) overtook Piastri for fourth, and Max Verstappen (Red Bull) ran alongside Liam Lawson (Red Bull) through the opening sequence of corners. At the end of lap 1, Verstappen lost control on the damp inside edge of the banked final corner as he accelerated while part of his car remained on the painted line. His car struck the outside barrier heavily and rebounded towards the circuit; the rest of the field avoided him, and he was uninjured. The accident caused Verstappen's retirement and prompted a red flag. On the same lap, Gabriel Bortoleto (Audi) spun through a full rotation while attempting to avoid the slowing cars and dropped to 18th place, while Nico Hülkenberg (Audi) took evasive action to avoid contact. Verstappen later accepted responsibility for the accident, and Red Bull found no mechanical fault with his car.

==== Red-flag restart ====
The running order reverted to that recorded at the end of lap 1, and the teams used the stoppage to change tyres. Norris fitted soft tyres, while Piastri switched to hards. Oliver Bearman (Haas) suffered a power-unit problem while travelling to the grid and stopped between turns 10 and 11, ending his race and necessitating an additional formation lap. Arvid Lindblad (Racing Bulls) and Colapinto were investigated for overtaking under double yellow flags following Verstappen's accident; both subsequently received drive-through penalties. The race resumed with a standing start on lap 5. Antonelli made the better launch and passed Norris on the inside at Tarzan corner to take the lead, while Piastri overtook Russell at turn 7 for third. Russell dropped to fourth, ahead of Leclerc and Lewis Hamilton (Ferrari), with Lawson seventh as the sole remaining Red Bull driver.

Antonelli initially opened a gap of more than one second over Norris, keeping the McLaren driver out of Overtake Mode range, while Piastri remained close enough to keep the leading pair in sight. Russell, who reported balance problems, headed a closely grouped train containing Leclerc and Hamilton, with neither Ferrari driver able to attempt a pass without compromising their corner exits. Lawson consolidated seventh place ahead of Gasly, Hülkenberg and Yuki Tsunoda (Racing Bulls), while Lindblad and Colapinto served their drive-through penalties and dropped to the rear of the field. Norris gradually reduced Antonelli's advantage, although Antonelli remained more stable through the faster sections and repeatedly rebuilt his margin in the final sector.

==== First pit stops ====
Russell was the first of the leading drivers to make a scheduled pit stop, changing from medium to hard tyres on lap 16 and rejoining in traffic. Piastri, who had restarted on hard tyres, stopped one lap later, but a slow service brought him back out behind Russell. Russell subsequently passed Gasly and Hülkenberg as he worked his way through the traffic. Antonelli and Norris stopped on lap 22 and fitted hard tyres; Antonelli retained the lead, although neither stop was especially quick. Leclerc pitted for mediums at the same stage, while Hamilton extended his stint and temporarily moved into first place. Hamilton remained on track until lap 26, when he fitted hard tyres and rejoined in sixth place, with clear air in which to close on the cars ahead. Once the first pit-stop cycle was complete, Antonelli led Norris, followed by Russell, Piastri, Leclerc and Hamilton.

The pit stops compressed several cars into a midfield group headed by Carlos Sainz Jr. (Williams). Lindblad, Hülkenberg, Gasly and Tsunoda ran in close succession behind him, and Hülkenberg made several passes in rapid succession as he recovered towards the points after starting 13th. Tsunoda also overtook Gasly, who was struggling for traction. At the front, Norris had moved back to within a second of Antonelli by lap 30, although a moment of oversteer briefly interrupted his progress. Leclerc simultaneously closed on Piastri and passed him around the outside of the banked turn 3 on lap 34; Hamilton followed by overtaking Piastri into turn 1 on the next lap. At half distance, Antonelli led Norris and Russell, with Leclerc, Hamilton and Piastri completing the top six; Lawson, Hülkenberg, Tsunoda and Gasly occupied the remaining points-paying positions.

==== Second pit stops ====
Mercedes initiated the second round of pit stops shortly after lap 40, bringing Antonelli in for another set of hard tyres before pitting Russell soon afterwards. Hamilton had by then caught Leclerc and asked Ferrari to reverse their order, but no exchange was made. Leclerc initially continued past the pit entry after being called in and stopped on the following lap, losing further time during the service; Hamilton expressed frustration over the radio as he remained behind his teammate. Piastri's stop was also slow, and he rejoined in sixth place. Norris extended his middle stint until lap 48, seven laps longer than Antonelli, before fitting fresh hard tyres. He rejoined approximately five seconds behind Antonelli, but the offset in tyre age enabled him to close quickly. Hamilton, whose own final stop had not yet been made, inherited the on-track lead, with Antonelli and Norris immediately behind him.

By lap 52, Norris was directly behind Antonelli, whose rear tyres were beginning to lose grip. Antonelli nevertheless remained close enough to Hamilton to use Overtake Mode and attempted to pass into turn 1 on lap 54. He moved towards the inside, leaving Norris the cleaner outside line; Norris braked later and swept around the outside of Antonelli to take second place. Later on the same lap, Hamilton ran wide at turn 10, allowing Norris to draw alongside and complete the pass for the lead through the following sequence of corners. Antonelli overtook Hamilton soon afterwards, but Norris had already begun to establish a margin at the front.

==== Race conclusion ====
A virtual safety car was deployed on lap 55 to recover Ocon's car, which had stopped on track. Antonelli and Hamilton used the neutralisation to fit soft tyres, while Norris and Russell remained on their existing hards. The virtual safety car period ended before Norris could make a stop without relinquishing the lead, leaving him several seconds ahead of Russell at the restart, with Antonelli a similar distance behind Russell. Antonelli's newer soft tyres enabled him to close rapidly, and Mercedes instructed Russell to yield second place on lap 65 so that Antonelli could pursue Norris. Russell initially questioned the instruction because of the risk that Hamilton might also catch him, but complied; after the race, he accepted that the swap had been justified by Antonelli's tyre advantage. Antonelli initially reduced Norris's lead, but his soft tyres then began to fade and Norris again pulled clear.

A late collision between Williams teammates Sainz and Alexander Albon left debris at turn 5 and triggered a second virtual safety car period on lap 70. Sainz subsequently received a ten-second time penalty for causing the collision, while Albon retired. The interruption effectively ended Antonelli's opportunity to challenge for victory. Norris controlled the final restart and won by more than eleven seconds over Antonelli, while Russell resisted late pressure from Hamilton to complete the podium; Leclerc finished fifth and Piastri sixth. Lawson crossed the line seventh and retained the position despite receiving a ten-second penalty for failing to slow sufficiently under yellow flags. Hülkenberg finished eighth, while Fernando Alonso (Aston Martin) used a long one-stop strategy to rise from 18th on the grid to ninth, ahead of Gasly. Tsunoda, Lindblad and Bortoleto were the next three finishers. Colapinto also received a ten-second penalty for failing to slow under yellow flags, in addition to his earlier drive-through, but neither his final position nor Lawson's changed. Pérez and Sainz completed the classified finishers, while Albon, Valtteri Bottas (Cadillac), Ocon, Lance Stroll (Aston Martin), Bearman and Verstappen did not finish.

=== Post-race and championship impact ===
The victory was Norris's second in succession following the Hungarian Grand Prix, his second at Zandvoort and the thirteenth of his Formula One career. It also gave McLaren a third consecutive Dutch Grand Prix victory. Antonelli retained the lead of the Drivers' Championship with 242 points, 59 ahead of both Russell and Hamilton. Russell moved ahead of Hamilton into second place on countback, having won two races to Hamilton's one, while Norris rose to fourth with 159 points, 83 behind Antonelli. Mercedes remained first in the Constructors' Championship with 425 points, 87 ahead of Ferrari, with McLaren third on 263.

=== Race classification ===
Pos.	No.	Driver	Constructor	Laps	Time/Retired	Grid	Points
1	1	(United Kingdom) Lando Norris	McLaren-Mercedes	72	2:04:44.859	1	25
2	12	(Italy) Kimi Antonelli	Mercedes	72	+11.536	3	18
3	63	(United Kingdom) George Russell	Mercedes	72	+15.906	2	15
4	44	(United Kingdom) Lewis Hamilton	Ferrari	72	+16.755	5	12
5	16	(Monaco) Charles Leclerc	Ferrari	72	+17.258	6	10
6	81	(Australia) Oscar Piastri	McLaren-Mercedes	72	+32.332	4	8
7	30	(New Zealand) Liam Lawson	Red Bull Racing-Red Bull Ford	72	+1:19.915^{a}	8	6
8	27	(Germany) Nico Hülkenberg	Audi	71	+1 lap	13	4
9	14	(Spain) Fernando Alonso	Aston Martin Aramco-Honda	71	+1 lap	18	2
10	10	(France) Pierre Gasly	Alpine-Mercedes	71	+1 lap	11	1
11	22	(Japan) Yuki Tsunoda	Racing Bulls-Red Bull Ford	71	+1 lap	12	
12	41	(United Kingdom) Arvid Lindblad	Racing Bulls-Red Bull Ford	71	+1 lap	10	
13	5	(Brazil) Gabriel Bortoleto	Audi	71	+1 lap	9	
14	43	(Argentina) Franco Colapinto	Alpine-Mercedes	70	+2 laps^{b}	14	
15	11	(Mexico) Sergio Pérez	Cadillac-Ferrari	70	+2 laps	PL	
16	55	(Spain) Carlos Sainz Jr.	Atlassian Williams-Mercedes	70	+2 laps^{c}	17	
17^{d}	23	(Thailand) Alexander Albon	Atlassian Williams-Mercedes	66	Collision damage	16	
Ret	77	(Finland) Valtteri Bottas	Cadillac-Ferrari	61	Hydraulics	21	
Ret	31	(France) Esteban Ocon	Haas-Ferrari	52	Engine	15	
Ret	18	(Canada) Lance Stroll	Aston Martin Aramco-Honda	45	Handling	19	
Ret	87	(United Kingdom) Oliver Bearman	Haas-Ferrari	2	Engine	20	
Ret	3	(Netherlands) Max Verstappen	Red Bull Racing-Red Bull Ford	0	Accident	7	

Notes

- ^a – Liam Lawson received a ten-second time penalty for failing to slow under yellow flags. His final position was not affected by the penalty.
- ^b – Franco Colapinto received a ten-second time penalty for failing to slow under yellow flags. His final position was not affected by the penalty.
- ^c – Carlos Sainz Jr. received a ten-second time penalty for causing a collision with Alexander Albon. His final position was not affected by the penalty.
- ^d – Alexander Albon was classified as he completed more than 90% of the race distance.

== Championship standings after the race ==
Drivers' Championship standings

	Pos.	Driver	Points
	1	(Italy) Kimi Antonelli	242
1	2	(United Kingdom) George Russell	183
1	3	(United Kingdom) Lewis Hamilton	183
1	4	(United Kingdom) Lando Norris	159
1	5	(Monaco) Charles Leclerc	155

Constructors' Championship standings

Pos.	Constructor	Points
1	(Germany) Mercedes	425
2	(Italy) Ferrari	338
3	(United Kingdom) McLaren-Mercedes	265
4	(Austria) Red Bull Racing-Red Bull Ford	189
5	(Italy) Racing Bulls-Red Bull Ford	70

- Note: Only the top five positions are included for both sets of standings.

Previous race: 2026 Hungarian Grand Prix	FIA Formula One World Championship; 2026 season	Next race: 2026 Italian Grand Prix
Previous race: 2025 Dutch Grand Prix	Dutch Grand Prix	Next race: N/A
