= 2026 Austrian Grand Prix =

Formula One motor race

Race 8 of 23 (Note: At the time of the event Formula One planned to hold twenty-two Grands Prix.) in the 2026 Formula One World Championship
| ← Previous race | Next race → |
- Layout of the Red Bull Ring, Austria

Race details
- Date: 28 June 2026
- Official name: Formula 1 Lenovo Austrian Grand Prix 2026
- Location: Red Bull Ring, Spielberg, Austria
- Course: Permanent racing facility
- Course length: 4.326 km (2.688 miles)
- Distance: 71 laps, 307.026 km (190.777 miles)
- Weather: Sunny. Max. ambient temp. 35.6°C, max. track temp. 52.1°C.
- Attendance: 320,000

Pole position
| Driver | (United Kingdom) George Russell | Mercedes |
- Time: 1:06.113

Fastest lap
| Driver | (Italy) Kimi Antonelli | Mercedes |
- Time: 1:10.374 on lap 59

Podium
| First | (United Kingdom) George Russell | Mercedes |
| Second | (Netherlands) Max Verstappen | Red Bull Racing-Red Bull Ford |
| Third | (Italy) Kimi Antonelli | Mercedes |

The 2026 Austrian Grand Prix (officially known as the Formula 1 Lenovo Austrian Grand Prix 2026) was a Formula One motor race held on 28 June 2026 at the Red Bull Ring in Spielberg, Austria. It was the eighth round of the 2026 Formula One World Championship.

George Russell (Mercedes) converted pole position for the race into a victory, having qualified ahead of Ferrari drivers Charles Leclerc and Lewis Hamilton and having set his fastest lap under a single yellow flag following a late crash by Max Verstappen (Red Bull) at turn 9; Russell retained pole position after the stewards determined that he had sufficiently reduced his speed through the affected sector. Verstappen and Russell's Mercedes teammate Kimi Antonelli rounded out the podium.

== Background ==
The Red Bull Ring in Spielberg hosted Formula One for the twenty-second time in the circuit's history, having previously held two editions of the Styrian Grand Prix and 19 editions of the Austrian Grand Prix, across the weekend of 26–28 June. It was the eighth round of the 2026 Formula One World Championship and the 39th running of the Austrian Grand Prix as a round of the Formula One World Championship.

=== Championship standings before the race ===
Going into the weekend, Kimi Antonelli led the Drivers' Championship with 156 points, 41 points ahead of Lewis Hamilton in second, and 50 ahead of George Russell in third. Mercedes, with 262 points, led the Constructors' Championship from Ferrari and McLaren, who were second and third with 190 and 141 points, respectively.

=== Entrants ===
The drivers and teams were the same as the season entry list with no additional stand-in drivers for the race.

During the first practice session, six teams fielded alternate drivers who had not raced in more than two Grands Prix, as required by the Formula One regulations:

- Luke Browning for Williams in place of Carlos Sainz Jr.
- Jak Crawford for Aston Martin in place of Lance Stroll.
- Paul Aron for Audi in place of Gabriel Bortoleto.
- Ryo Hirakawa for Haas in place of Esteban Ocon.
- Ayumu Iwasa for Racing Bulls in place of Liam Lawson.
- Dino Beganovic for Ferrari in place of Charles Leclerc.

=== Tyre choices ===
Tyre supplier Pirelli brought the C3, C4, and C5 tyre compounds—the softest three in their range (designated hard, medium, and soft, respectively)—for teams to use at the event.

== Practice ==
Three free practice sessions were held for the event. The first free practice session was held on 26 June 2026, at 13:30 local time (UTC+2), and was topped by Kimi Antonelli (Mercedes) ahead of his teammate George Russell and Oscar Piastri (McLaren). A red flag was observed in the closing minutes of the session due to Sergio Pérez (Cadillac) stopping on track. The second free practice session was held on the same day, at 17:00 local time, and was topped by Antonelli ahead of Piastri and Lando Norris (McLaren). The third free practice session was held on 27 June 2026, at 12:30 local time, and was topped by Russell ahead of Antonelli and Lewis Hamilton (Ferrari).

== Qualifying ==
Qualifying was held on 27 June 2026, at 16:00 local time (UTC+2), and determined the starting grid order for the race.

=== Qualifying report ===
Qualifying was held in hot conditions at the Red Bull Ring. Mercedes entered the session as the team to beat after topping all three practice sessions.

Esteban Ocon was the first driver to set a timed lap in the opening segment of qualifying (Q1), before Nico Hülkenberg and then Russell moved to the top of the timesheets. Antonelli subsequently led the segment, ahead of Lando Norris and Hamilton, while Russell initially struggled for balance and reported that all four wheels were sliding. The final runs produced a closely contested battle for progression to the second segment of qualifying (Q2). Liam Lawson improved to fourth, while Russell recovered to fifth, but Carlos Sainz Jr. lost time with a slide through the final corner and missed the Q2 cut. His Williams team-mate Alexander Albon also failed to progress after an error at turn 1, making it a double Q1 elimination for the team. The two Cadillacs of Sergio Pérez and Valtteri Bottas were eliminated in nineteenth and twentieth, despite the team's update package, while Fernando Alonso and Lance Stroll placed twenty-first and twenty-second for Aston Martin.

Antonelli again headed the field in Q2, with the two McLarens of Piastri and Norris following closely behind. Max Verstappen completed only one push lap, after Red Bull elected not to send him back out in order to preserve an additional set of fresh soft tyres for Q3 (the final segment of qualifying). The decision left Verstappen vulnerable as he slipped to tenth while rivals improved. Gasly was eliminated in eleventh, followed by Gabriel Bortoleto, Oliver Bearman, Hülkenberg, Ocon and Franco Colapinto, who suffered a snap of oversteer at turn 1 on his final attempt.

Norris set the initial benchmark in Q3, before Verstappen responded with the fastest lap of the weekend to that point. Antonelli then beat Verstappen to take provisional pole, with Russell behind his Mercedes teammate. Hamilton ran wide at turn 3 on his first Q3 attempt and did not set a time, leaving him with a single remaining opportunity in the final runs. Hamilton subsequently moved to provisional pole, only for Leclerc to take the position.

The session changed when Verstappen lost control of his Red Bull at turn 9 during his final attempt and crashed into the barriers. The incident produced local yellow flags as Russell approached the final sector. Antonelli abandoned his lap after believing that double-waved yellow flags had been shown, while Russell continued after reducing speed through the affected marshaling sector. Russell completed the lap, which was enough to move him to first. The stewards determined that no further investigation was necessary after concluding that Russell had encountered a single yellow flag and had lifted sufficiently; allowing Russell to keep pole position.

Russell's lap secured his fourth pole position of the season and his first at the Austrian Grand Prix. Mercedes remained unbeaten in Grand Prix qualifying in 2026, taking pole for the eighth consecutive round, while Leclerc and Hamilton gave Ferrari second and third on the grid.

=== Qualifying classification ===
| Pos. | No. | Driver | Constructor | Qualifying times | | | Final grid |
| Pos. | No. | Driver | Constructor | Q1 | Q2 | Q3 | Final grid |
|---|---|---|---|---|---|---|---|
| 1 | 63 | (United Kingdom) George Russell | Mercedes | 1:07.398 | 1:06.979 | 1:06.113 | 1 |
| 2 | 16 | (Monaco) Charles Leclerc | Ferrari | 1:07.543 | 1:07.030 | 1:06.349 | 2 |
| 3 | 44 | (United Kingdom) Lewis Hamilton | Ferrari | 1:07.290 | 1:06.994 | 1:06.408 | 3 |
| 4 | 12 | (Italy) Kimi Antonelli | Mercedes | 1:07.083 | 1:06.763 | 1:06.414 | 4 |
| 5 | 3 | (Netherlands) Max Verstappen | Red Bull Racing-Red Bull Ford | 1:07.407 | 1:07.183 | 1:06.475 | 5 |
| 6 | 1 | (United Kingdom) Lando Norris | McLaren-Mercedes | 1:07.259 | 1:06.897 | 1:06.502 | 6 |
| 7 | 81 | (Australia) Oscar Piastri | McLaren-Mercedes | 1:07.487 | 1:06.890 | 1:06.511 | 7 |
| 8 | 6 | (France) Isack Hadjar | Red Bull Racing-Red Bull Ford | 1:07.408 | 1:07.086 | 1:06.632 | 8 |
| 9 | 30 | (New Zealand) Liam Lawson | Racing Bulls-Red Bull Ford | 1:07.385 | 1:07.136 | 1:06.955 | 9 |
| 10 | 41 | (United Kingdom) Arvid Lindblad | Racing Bulls-Red Bull Ford | 1:07.549 | 1:07.155 | 1:07.007 | 10 |
| 11 | 10 | (France) Pierre Gasly | Alpine-Mercedes | 1:08.038 | 1:07.223 | N/A | 11 |
| 12 | 5 | (Brazil) Gabriel Bortoleto | Audi | 1:08.035 | 1:07.293 | N/A | 12 |
| 13 | 87 | (United Kingdom) Oliver Bearman | Haas-Ferrari | 1:08.061 | 1:07.523 | N/A | 13 |
| 14 | 27 | (Germany) Nico Hülkenberg | Audi | 1:08.066 | 1:07.611 | N/A | 14 |
| 15 | 31 | (France) Esteban Ocon | Haas-Ferrari | 1:08.231 | 1:07.817 | N/A | 15 |
| 16 | 43 | (Argentina) Franco Colapinto | Alpine-Mercedes | 1:07.894 | 1:08.171 | N/A | 16 |
| 17 | 55 | (Spain) Carlos Sainz Jr. | Atlassian Williams-Mercedes | 1:08.252 | N/A | N/A | 17 |
| 18 | 23 | (Thailand) Alexander Albon | Atlassian Williams-Mercedes | 1:08.509 | N/A | N/A | 18 |
| 19 | 11 | (Mexico) Sergio Pérez | Cadillac-Ferrari | 1:08.945 | N/A | N/A | 19 |
| 20 | 77 | (Finland) Valtteri Bottas | Cadillac-Ferrari | 1:09.030 | N/A | N/A | 20 |
| 21 | 14 | (Spain) Fernando Alonso | Aston Martin Aramco-Honda | 1:09.942 | N/A | N/A | 21 |
| 22 | 18 | (Canada) Lance Stroll | Aston Martin Aramco-Honda | 1:10.363 | N/A | N/A | 22 |
107% time: 1:11.778

== Race ==
The race was held on 28 June 2026, at 15:00 local time (UTC+2), and was run for 71 laps.

=== Race report ===
The race was held in hot conditions at the Red Bull Ring, with tyre management expected to play a significant role over the 71 laps. Most of the leading runners began on the medium compound, while Gabriel Bortoleto and Carlos Sainz Jr. were among those who selected soft tyres. Lando Norris reported a long brake pedal on the formation lap, although McLaren resolved the issue before the start.

Russell defended the lead into the first corner, while Leclerc initially retained second. Hamilton and Leclerc ran alongside one another through the opening sequence of corners, with Hamilton emerging ahead of his Ferrari teammate by turn 5. Antonelli ran wide at both turns 1 and 3 on the opening lap, and again went off the circuit at turn 1 on the second lap while trying to pass Leclerc. Although Antonelli briefly moved ahead, he was required to return the position, which allowed Verstappen to close on the pair. Verstappen subsequently passed Antonelli at turn 5 and Leclerc at the following corner, moving into third behind Russell and Hamilton.

The opening laps were also affected by a double retirement for Cadillac. Valtteri Bottas reported a brake fire and entered the pits to retire, while teammate Sergio Pérez subsequently reported smoke in the cockpit. Pérez also stopped in the pit lane, with Cadillac confirming that both retirements were caused by overheating brakes. The two failures occurred within the first five laps. At the front, Russell established an advantage of approximately three seconds while Verstappen began to pressure Hamilton for second place. A battery deployment issue resulted in Leclerc losing a position to Antonelli. Verstappen made his first attempt to pass Hamilton at turn 3 on lap 11, but Hamilton responded through turns 5 and 6, forcing Verstappen onto the gravel on the exit of the corner. Verstappen complained over team radio that Hamilton should receive a penalty, although the stewards took no further action after reviewing the incident.

Hamilton was the first of the front-runners to make a pit stop, changing from medium to hard tyres at the end of lap 12. Leclerc made a similar stop soon afterwards, while Verstappen extended his first stint before committing to a two-stop strategy. Russell and Antonelli retained their relative positions through the first cycle of stops, while Norris also remained in contention after extending his opening stint. Verstappen and Hamilton resumed their battle after the first pit stop phase, with Verstappen again passing Hamilton at turn 3 on lap 22 before Hamilton regained the position through the following corners. Verstappen then positioned his car on the inside line at turn 6 and completed the move for second place.

The race's first virtual safety car period was triggered when Sainz stopped on the start-finish straight with a suspected electrical problem. Antonelli had entered the pits shortly before the virtual safety car was deployed, which dropped him behind both Ferraris. Hamilton had passed the pit entry when Ferrari instructed him to come in for a pit stop, making his stop on the following lap for a set of used soft tyres before the pit lane was temporarily closed during the recovery of Sainz's car. The interruption further committed Ferrari to a three-stop strategy for Hamilton, while Leclerc followed a similarly aggressive approach as the team sought to offset his limited race pace through fresher tyres. When racing resumed, Antonelli quickly recovered ground. He passed Leclerc at turn 5 on lap 30 and returned to the leading group, while Leclerc later fell behind Oscar Piastri and Hamilton. Russell, Verstappen and Antonelli gradually separated themselves from the Ferrari drivers, with the leading trio adopting two-stop strategies. Hamilton and Leclerc, by contrast, required three stops and were unable to sustain the pace required to remain in podium contention. Lance Stroll retired his Aston Martin during the later stages of the race with a suspected ERS problem.

Russell made his second stop on lap 44, taking hard tyres and returning to the track ahead of the cars that had yet to make their final stops. Red Bull elected to leave Verstappen out for a further five laps, giving him a tyre-age advantage for the final stint but costing him track position. Verstappen eventually stopped on lap 49 for a new set of hard tyres and rejoined approximately ten seconds behind Russell with 22 laps remaining. Antonelli stopped two laps later, also taking hard tyres, and rejoined in third place behind Verstappen. A second, short virtual safety car period occurred on lap 53 after Alexander Albon struck and displaced a bollard at turn 3. Verstappen used his newer tyres to reduce the deficit to Russell during the closing stages, although he was unable to get close enough to attempt an overtake. Russell briefly ran wide on lap 58 and lost time, but maintained sufficient pace to control the lead. Antonelli also closed rapidly on Verstappen, leaving the Red Bull driver to defend second place on the final lap. Russell took the win ahead of Verstappen, while Antonelli finished in third, setting the fastest lap of the race in the process.

==== Post-race and championship impact ====
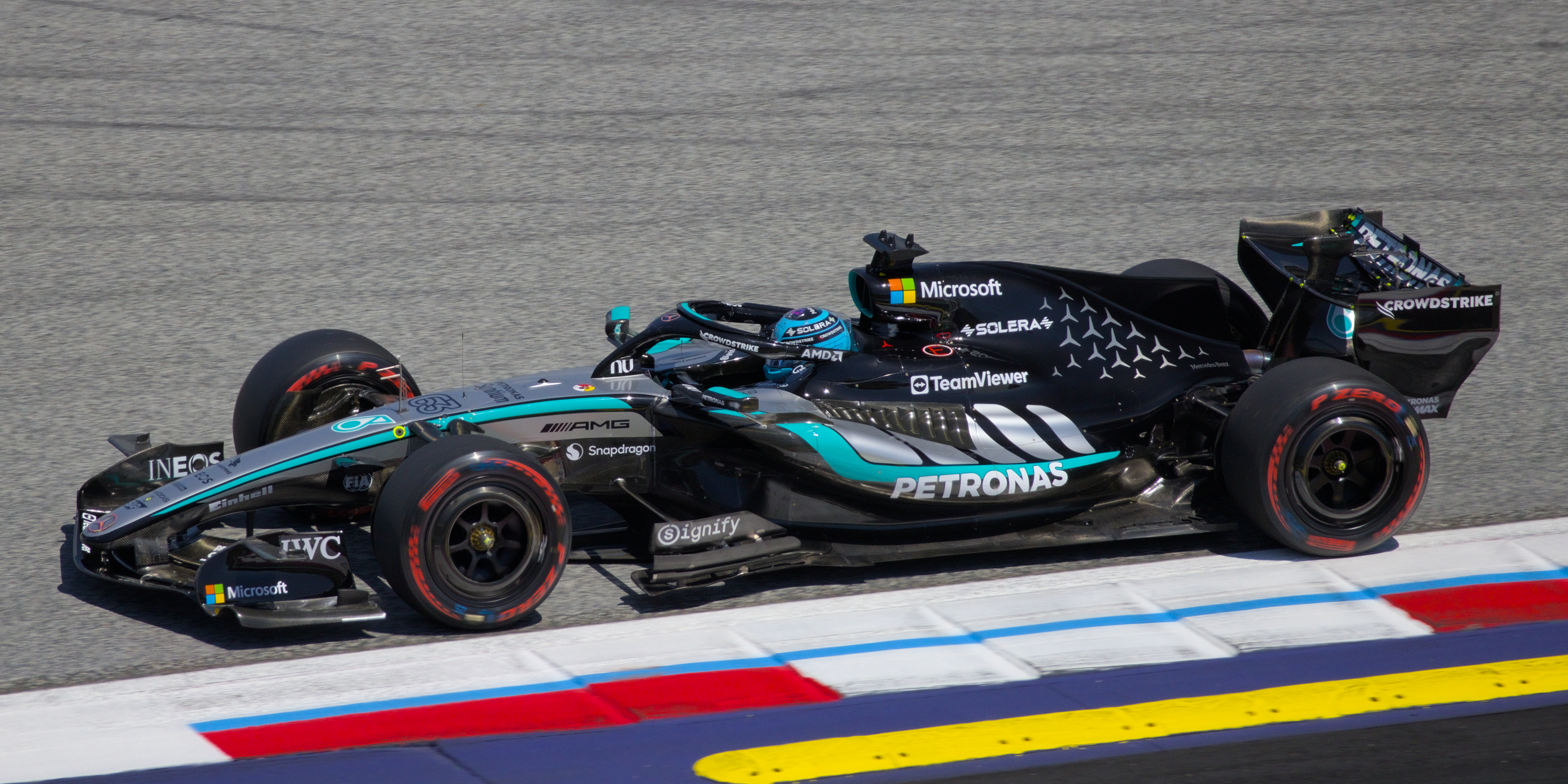
Mercedes' Russell took his second victory of the season and reduced Antonelli's lead at the top of the championship to 40 points.

Russell's victory was his second of the 2026 season and the seventh of his career. The result returned him to second place in the Drivers' Championship. Antonelli retained the championship lead on 171 points, ahead of Russell on 131, while Hamilton dropped to third. Verstappen's second place gave Red Bull its strongest result of the season to that point.

=== Race classification ===
| Pos. | No. | Driver | Constructor | Laps | Time/Retired | Grid | Points |
|---|---|---|---|---|---|---|---|
| 1 | 63 | (United Kingdom) George Russell | Mercedes | 71 | 1:26:37.979 | 1 | 25 |
| 2 | 3 | (Netherlands) Max Verstappen | Red Bull Racing-Red Bull Ford | 71 | +1.611 | 5 | 18 |
| 3 | 12 | (Italy) Kimi Antonelli | Mercedes | 71 | +1.986 | 4 | 15 |
| 4 | 81 | (Australia) Oscar Piastri | McLaren-Mercedes | 71 | +21.809 | 7 | 12 |
| 5 | 44 | (United Kingdom) Lewis Hamilton | Ferrari | 71 | +26.393 | 3 | 10 |
| 6 | 6 | (France) Isack Hadjar | Red Bull Racing-Red Bull Ford | 71 | +29.399 | 8 | 8 |
| 7 | 1 | (United Kingdom) Lando Norris | McLaren-Mercedes | 71 | +31.505 | 6 | 6 |
| 8 | 16 | (Monaco) Charles Leclerc | Ferrari | 71 | +45.659 | 2 | 4 |
| 9 | 30 | (New Zealand) Liam Lawson | Racing Bulls-Red Bull Ford | 70 | +1 lap | 9 | 2 |
| 10 | 41 | (United Kingdom) Arvid Lindblad | Racing Bulls-Red Bull Ford | 70 | +1 lap | 10 | 1 |
| 11 | 5 | (Brazil) Gabriel Bortoleto | Audi | 70 | +1 lap | 12 | |
| 12 | 27 | (Germany) Nico Hülkenberg | Audi | 70 | +1 lap | 14 | |
| 13 | 10 | (France) Pierre Gasly | Alpine-Mercedes | 70 | +1 lap | 11 | |
| 14 | 87 | (United Kingdom) Oliver Bearman | Haas-Ferrari | 70 | +1 lap | 13 | |
| 15 | 43 | (Argentina) Franco Colapinto | Alpine-Mercedes | 70 | +1 lap | 16 | |
| 16 | 31 | (France) Esteban Ocon | Haas-Ferrari | 69 | +2 laps | 15 | |
| 17 | 23 | (Thailand) Alexander Albon | Atlassian Williams-Mercedes | 69 | +2 laps | 18 | |
| 18 | 14 | (Spain) Fernando Alonso | Aston Martin Aramco-Honda | 68 | +3 laps | 21 | |
| Ret | 18 | (Canada) Lance Stroll | Aston Martin Aramco-Honda | 45 | ERS | 22 | |
| Ret | 55 | (Spain) Carlos Sainz Jr. | Atlassian Williams-Mercedes | 23 | Electrical | 17 | |
| Ret | 11 | (Mexico) Sergio Pérez | Cadillac-Ferrari | 4 | Brakes | 19 | |
| Ret | 77 | (Finland) Valtteri Bottas | Cadillac-Ferrari | 2 | Brakes | 20 | |

== Championship standings after the race ==
Drivers' Championship standings

| | Pos. | Driver | Points |
|---|---|---|---|
| | 1 | (Italy) Kimi Antonelli | 171 |
| 1 | 2 | (United Kingdom) George Russell | 131 |
| 1 | 3 | (United Kingdom) Lewis Hamilton | 125 |
| 2 | 4 | (Australia) Oscar Piastri | 82 |
| | 5 | (United Kingdom) Lando Norris | 79 |

Constructors' Championship standings

| | Pos. | Constructor | Points |
|---|---|---|---|
| | 1 | (Germany) Mercedes | 302 |
| | 2 | (Italy) Ferrari | 204 |
| | 3 | (United Kingdom) McLaren-Mercedes | 161 |
| | 4 | (Austria) Red Bull Racing-Red Bull Ford | 118 |
| 1 | 5 | (Italy) Racing Bulls-Red Bull Ford | 48 |

- Note: Only the top five positions are included for both sets of standings.

== See also ==
- 2026 Spielberg Formula 2 round
- 2026 Spielberg Formula 3 round

== Notes ==
| Previous race: 2026 Barcelona-Catalunya Grand Prix | FIA Formula One World Championship; 2026 season | Next race: 2026 British Grand Prix |
| Previous race: 2025 Austrian Grand Prix | Austrian Grand Prix | Next race: 2027 Austrian Grand Prix |
