= 2026 Chinese Grand Prix =

Second round of the 2026 F1 season

Race 2 of 23 (Note: At the time of the event Formula One planned to hold twenty-four Grands Prix.) in the 2026 Formula One World Championship
← Previous race	Next race →
- Layout of the Shanghai International Circuit

Race details
- Date: 15 March 2026
- Official name: Formula 1 Heineken Chinese Grand Prix 2026
- Location: Shanghai International Circuit; Shanghai, China
- Course: Permanent racing facility
- Course length: 5.451 km (3.387 miles)
- Distance: 56 laps, 305.066 km (189.559 miles)
- Weather: Cloudy. Max. ambient temp. 16°C, max. track temp. 23.6°C.
- Attendance: 230,000

Pole position
Driver	(Italy) Kimi Antonelli	Mercedes
- Time: 1:32.064

Fastest lap
Driver	(Italy) Kimi Antonelli	Mercedes
- Time: 1:35.275 on lap 52

Podium
First	(Italy) Kimi Antonelli	Mercedes
Second	(United Kingdom) George Russell	Mercedes
Third	(United Kingdom) Lewis Hamilton	Ferrari

The 2026 Chinese Grand Prix (officially known as the Formula 1 Heineken Chinese Grand Prix 2026) was a Formula One motor race that was held on 15 March 2026 at the Shanghai International Circuit in Shanghai, China. It was the second round of the 2026 Formula One World Championship and the first of six Grands Prix in the season to utilise the sprint format.

George Russell (Mercedes) converted pole position in the sprint to a victory. His teammate, 19-year-old Kimi Antonelli, became the youngest Formula One polesitter, second-youngest Grand Prix winner and the first Italian to win a Grand Prix since Giancarlo Fisichella at the 2006 Malaysian Grand Prix. Antonelli led a Mercedes 1–2 ahead of Russell and Lewis Hamilton, who achieved his maiden podium with Ferrari.

== Background ==
The event was held at the Shanghai International Circuit in Shanghai for the 19th time in the circuit's history, across the weekend of 13–15 March. The Grand Prix was the second round of the 2026 Formula One World Championship and the 19th running of the Chinese Grand Prix. It was also the first of six Grands Prix in the season to utilise the sprint format and the third time overall that the Chinese Grand Prix featured it.

=== Championship standings before the race ===
Going into the event, George Russell led the Drivers' Championship with 25 points, 7 points ahead of his teammate Kimi Antonelli in second, and 10 ahead of Charles Leclerc (Ferrari) in third. Mercedes entered this round as the leaders of the Constructors' Championship with 43 points, 16 ahead of Ferrari and 33 ahead of McLaren, who were second and third, respectively.

=== Entrants ===
The drivers and teams were the same as published in the season entry list, with no additional stand-in drivers for the race. The Grand Prix marked the 1,000th entry for McLaren.

=== Tyre choices ===
Tyre supplier Pirelli brought the C2, C3, and C4 tyre compounds designated hard, medium, and soft, respectively, for teams to use at the event.

== Practice ==
The only free practice session was held on 13 March 2026, at 11:30 local time (UTC+8), and was topped by George Russell (Mercedes), ahead of teammate Kimi Antonelli and Lando Norris (McLaren).

== Sprint qualifying ==
Sprint qualifying was held on 13 March 2026, at 15:30 local time (UTC+8), and determined the starting grid order for the sprint.

=== Sprint qualifying report ===
Sprint qualifying consisted of three sessions, with the six drivers with the slowest lap times being eliminated following each of the first two sessions. For the first two sessions, new medium tyres were mandated, while the third and final session allowed teams to use any set of soft tyres.

During the twelve-minute long first session (SQ1), Carlos Sainz Jr. and Alexander Albon (both Williams) were eliminated, alongside Fernando Alonso and Lance Stroll (both Aston Martin), and Valtteri Bottas and Sergio Pérez (both Cadillac), Pérez did not set a time during the session. The second session (SQ2), which lasted for ten minutes, saw the eliminations of Nico Hülkenberg and Gabriel Bortoleto (both Audi), Liam Lawson and Arvid Lindblad (both Racing Bulls), Esteban Ocon (Haas), and Franco Colapinto (Alpine).

The third session (SQ3) lasted for eight minutes, and determined the final order of the remaining ten drivers. George Russell (Mercedes) took pole position ahead of teammate Kimi Antonelli, while Lando Norris (McLaren) finished third. Lewis Hamilton (Ferrari) and Oscar Piastri (McLaren) finished in fourth and fifth, respectively. Charles Leclerc, Pierre Gasly, Max Verstappen, Oliver Bearman, and Isack Hadjar completed the rest of the top ten.

=== Sprint qualifying classification ===
Pos.	No.	Driver	Constructor	Qualifying times			Sprint grid
Pos.	No.	Driver	Constructor	SQ1	SQ2	SQ3	Sprint grid
1	63	(United Kingdom) George Russell	Mercedes	1:33.030	1:32.241	1:31.520	1
2	12	(Italy) Kimi Antonelli	Mercedes	1:33.455	1:32.291	1:31.809	2
3	1	(United Kingdom) Lando Norris	McLaren-Mercedes	1:33.783	1:33.086	1:32.141	3
4	44	(United Kingdom) Lewis Hamilton	Ferrari	1:33.148	1:33.042	1:32.161	4
5	81	(Australia) Oscar Piastri	McLaren-Mercedes	1:33.813	1:33.038	1:32.224	5
6	16	(Monaco) Charles Leclerc	Ferrari	1:33.194	1:32.602	1:32.528	6
7	10	(France) Pierre Gasly	Alpine-Mercedes	1:33.970	1:33.405	1:32.888	7
8	3	(Netherlands) Max Verstappen	Red Bull Racing-Red Bull Ford	1:34.170	1:33.564	1:33.254	8
9	87	(United Kingdom) Oliver Bearman	Haas-Ferrari	1:34.280	1:33.501	1:33.409	9
10	6	(France) Isack Hadjar	Red Bull Racing-Red Bull Ford	1:34.447	1:33.620	1:33.723	10
11	27	(Germany) Nico Hülkenberg	Audi	1:33.997	1:33.635	N/A	11
12	31	(France) Esteban Ocon	Haas-Ferrari	1:34.087	1:33.639	N/A	12
13	30	(New Zealand) Liam Lawson	Racing Bulls-Red Bull Ford	1:34.110	1:33.714	N/A	13
14	5	(Brazil) Gabriel Bortoleto	Audi	1:34.291	1:33.774	N/A	14
15	41	(United Kingdom) Arvid Lindblad	Racing Bulls-Red Bull Ford	1:34.495	1:34.048	N/A	15
16	43	(Argentina) Franco Colapinto	Alpine-Mercedes	1:34.592	1:34.327	N/A	16
17	55	(Spain) Carlos Sainz Jr.	Atlassian Williams-Mercedes	1:34.761	N/A	N/A	17
18	23	(Thailand) Alexander Albon	Atlassian Williams-Mercedes	1:35.305	N/A	N/A	PL^{a}
19	14	(Spain) Fernando Alonso	Aston Martin Aramco-Honda	1:35.581	N/A	N/A	18
20	18	(Canada) Lance Stroll	Aston Martin Aramco-Honda	1:36.151	N/A	N/A	19
21	77	(Finland) Valtteri Bottas	Cadillac-Ferrari	1:37.378	N/A	N/A	20
107% time: 1:39.542
—	11	(Mexico) Sergio Pérez	Cadillac-Ferrari	No time	N/A	N/A	21^{b}

Notes

- ^a – Alexander Albon qualified 18th, but was required to start the sprint from the pit lane as his car was modified under parc fermé conditions.
- ^b – Sergio Pérez failed to set a time during sprint qualifying. He was permitted to race in the sprint at the stewards' discretion.

== Sprint ==
The sprint was held on 14 March 2026, at 11:00 local time (UTC+8), and was run for 19 laps.

=== Sprint report ===
The sprint began with George Russell holding first into the first turn, while Lewis Hamilton had move up to second from fourth, having passed Kimi Antonelli and Lando Norris down the main straight. Hamilton then passed Russell into turn 14, and was in the lead at the end of lap one. At turn 4, Antonelli made contact with Isack Hadjar, and received a 10-second penalty as a result. By lap 5, Russell had overtaken Hamilton, and was increasing his lead. Behind, Charles Leclerc had overtaken his teammate Hamilton on lap 8, with Antonelli getting past Oscar Piastri and Norris. Antonelli then overtook Hamilton on lap 11, and Leclerc two laps later. Nico Hulkenberg then came to a stop, prompting a safety car and most of the front runners fitted the soft compound tyre. Antonelli served his penalty, coming out just ahead of Piastri in seventh. The sprint resumed on lap 14, with Russell holding the lead until the end. Leclerc finished second, with Hamilton two seconds behind in third. Norris held off Antonelli to take fourth. Piastri, Liam Lawson and Oliver Bearman collected the remaining points, in sixth to eighth respectively.

=== Sprint classification ===
Pos.	No.	Driver	Constructor	Laps	Time/Retired	Grid	Points
1	63	(United Kingdom) George Russell	Mercedes	19	33:38.998	1	8
2	16	(Monaco) Charles Leclerc	Ferrari	19	+0.674	6	7
3	44	(United Kingdom) Lewis Hamilton	Ferrari	19	+2.554	4	6
4	1	(United Kingdom) Lando Norris	McLaren-Mercedes	19	+4.433	3	5
5	12	(Italy) Kimi Antonelli	Mercedes	19	+5.688	2	4
6	81	(Australia) Oscar Piastri	McLaren-Mercedes	19	+6.809	5	3
7	30	(New Zealand) Liam Lawson	Racing Bulls-Red Bull Ford	19	+10.900	13	2
8	87	(United Kingdom) Oliver Bearman	Haas-Ferrari	19	+11.271	9	1
9	3	(Netherlands) Max Verstappen	Red Bull Racing-Red Bull Ford	19	+11.619	8	
10	31	(France) Esteban Ocon	Haas-Ferrari	19	+13.887	12	
11	10	(France) Pierre Gasly	Alpine-Mercedes	19	+14.780	7	
12	55	(Spain) Carlos Sainz Jr.	Atlassian Williams-Mercedes	19	+15.753	17	
13	5	(Brazil) Gabriel Bortoleto	Audi	19	+15.858	14	
14	43	(Argentina) Franco Colapinto	Alpine-Mercedes	19	+16.393	16	
15	6	(France) Isack Hadjar	Red Bull Racing-Red Bull Ford	19	+16.430	10	
16	23	(Thailand) Alexander Albon	Atlassian Williams-Mercedes	19	+20.014	PL	
17	14	(Spain) Fernando Alonso	Aston Martin Aramco-Honda	19	+21.599	18	
18	18	(Canada) Lance Stroll	Aston Martin Aramco-Honda	19	+21.971	19	
19	11	(Mexico) Sergio Pérez	Cadillac-Ferrari	19	+28.241^{a}	21	
Ret	27	(Germany) Nico Hülkenberg	Audi	12	Engine	11	
Ret	77	(Finland) Valtteri Bottas	Cadillac-Ferrari	12	Power loss	20	
Ret	41	(United Kingdom) Arvid Lindblad	Racing Bulls-Red Bull Ford	11	Withdrew	15	

Notes

- ^a – Sergio Pérez received a five-second time penalty for a safety car infringement. The penalty made no difference as he was classified in the last position.

== Qualifying ==
Qualifying was held on 14 March 2026, at 15:00 local time (UTC+8), and determined the starting grid order for the main race. Kimi Antonelli took pole position, at 19 years old he become the youngest Formula One polesitter, beating the record set at the 2008 Italian Grand Prix by Sebastian Vettel who was 21.

=== Qualifying classification ===
Pos.	No.	Driver	Constructor	Qualifying times			Final grid
Pos.	No.	Driver	Constructor	Q1	Q2	Q3	Final grid
1	12	(Italy) Kimi Antonelli	Mercedes	1:33.305	1:32.443	1:32.064	1
2	63	(United Kingdom) George Russell	Mercedes	1:33.262	1:32.523	1:32.286	2
3	44	(United Kingdom) Lewis Hamilton	Ferrari	1:33.522	1:32.567	1:32.415	3
4	16	(Monaco) Charles Leclerc	Ferrari	1:33.175	1:32.486	1:32.428	4
5	81	(Australia) Oscar Piastri	McLaren-Mercedes	1:33.590	1:33.130	1:32.550	5
6	1	(United Kingdom) Lando Norris	McLaren-Mercedes	1:33.535	1:32.910	1:32.608	6
7	10	(France) Pierre Gasly	Alpine-Mercedes	1:33.788	1:33.003	1:32.873	7
8	3	(Netherlands) Max Verstappen	Red Bull Racing-Red Bull Ford	1:33.417	1:33.098	1:33.002	8
9	6	(France) Isack Hadjar	Red Bull Racing-Red Bull Ford	1:33.632	1:33.352	1:33.121	9
10	87	(United Kingdom) Oliver Bearman	Haas-Ferrari	1:33.687	1:33.197	1:33.292	10
11	27	(Germany) Nico Hülkenberg	Audi	1:34.116	1:33.354	N/A	11
12	43	(Argentina) Franco Colapinto	Alpine-Mercedes	1:33.634	1:33.357	N/A	12
13	31	(France) Esteban Ocon	Haas-Ferrari	1:33.974	1:33.538	N/A	13
14	30	(New Zealand) Liam Lawson	Racing Bulls-Red Bull Ford	1:34.139	1:33.765	N/A	14
15	41	(United Kingdom) Arvid Lindblad	Racing Bulls-Red Bull Ford	1:33.906	1:33.784	N/A	15
16	5	(Brazil) Gabriel Bortoleto	Audi	1:33.549	1:33.965	N/A	16
17	55	(Spain) Carlos Sainz Jr.	Atlassian Williams-Mercedes	1:34.317	N/A	N/A	17
18	23	(Thailand) Alexander Albon	Atlassian Williams-Mercedes	1:34.772	N/A	N/A	PL^{a}
19	14	(Spain) Fernando Alonso	Aston Martin Aramco-Honda	1:35.203	N/A	N/A	18
20	77	(Finland) Valtteri Bottas	Cadillac-Ferrari	1:35.436	N/A	N/A	19
21	18	(Canada) Lance Stroll	Aston Martin Aramco-Honda	1:35.995	N/A	N/A	20
22	11	(Mexico) Sergio Pérez	Cadillac-Ferrari	1:36.906	N/A	N/A	21
107% time: 1:39.697

Notes

- ^a – Alexander Albon qualified 18th, but was required to start the race from the pit lane as his car was modified under parc fermé conditions.

== Race ==
The race was held on 15 March 2026, at 15:00 local time (UTC+8), and was run for 56 laps.

=== Race report ===
Lando Norris, Oscar Piastri, Gabriel Bortoleto, and Alexander Albon all failed to make the race start. Norris and Piastri both suffered power unit problems. Bortoleto and Albon failed to start the race due to hydraulic problems.

Starting from pole position, Antonelli took his maiden Grand Prix win, Championship leader George Russell finished second. It was the first win for an Italian driver in Formula One since Giancarlo Fisichella at the 2006 Malaysian Grand Prix. With his win, Antonelli also became the second-youngest Formula One winner and the youngest driver to secure a hat trick. Lewis Hamilton took his first podium in a full Grand Prix for Ferrari after duelling with teammate Charles Leclerc for third for much of the race.

=== Race classification ===
Pos.	No.	Driver	Constructor	Laps	Time/Retired	Grid	Points
1	12	(Italy) Kimi Antonelli	Mercedes	56	1:33:15.607	1	25
2	63	(United Kingdom) George Russell	Mercedes	56	+5.515	2	18
3	44	(United Kingdom) Lewis Hamilton	Ferrari	56	+25.267	3	15
4	16	(Monaco) Charles Leclerc	Ferrari	56	+28.894	4	12
5	87	(United Kingdom) Oliver Bearman	Haas-Ferrari	56	+57.268	10	10
6	10	(France) Pierre Gasly	Alpine-Mercedes	56	+59.647	7	8
7	30	(New Zealand) Liam Lawson	Racing Bulls-Red Bull Ford	56	+1:20.588	14	6
8	6	(France) Isack Hadjar	Red Bull Racing-Red Bull Ford	56	+1:27.247	9	4
9	55	(Spain) Carlos Sainz Jr.	Atlassian Williams-Mercedes	55	+1 lap	17	2
10	43	(Argentina) Franco Colapinto	Alpine-Mercedes	55	+1 lap	12	1
11	27	(Germany) Nico Hülkenberg	Audi	55	+1 lap	11	
12	41	(United Kingdom) Arvid Lindblad	Racing Bulls-Red Bull Ford	55	+1 lap	15	
13	77	(Finland) Valtteri Bottas	Cadillac-Ferrari	55	+1 lap	19	
14	31	(France) Esteban Ocon	Haas-Ferrari	55	+1 lap	13	
15	11	(Mexico) Sergio Pérez	Cadillac-Ferrari	55	+1 lap	21	
Ret	3	(Netherlands) Max Verstappen	Red Bull Racing-Red Bull Ford	45	Coolant leak	8	
Ret	14	(Spain) Fernando Alonso	Aston Martin Aramco-Honda	32	Vibrations	18	
Ret	18	(Canada) Lance Stroll	Aston Martin Aramco-Honda	9	Battery	20	
DNS	81	(Australia) Oscar Piastri	McLaren-Mercedes	0	Electrical	—^{a}	
DNS	1	(United Kingdom) Lando Norris	McLaren-Mercedes	0	Electrical	—^{a}	
DNS	5	(Brazil) Gabriel Bortoleto	Audi	0	Hydraulics	—^{a}	
DNS	23	(Thailand) Alexander Albon	Atlassian Williams-Mercedes	0	Hydraulics	—^{a}	

Notes

- ^a – Oscar Piastri, Lando Norris, Gabriel Bortoleto and Alexander Albon did not start the race due to issues. Their places on the grid were left vacant.

== Championship standings after the race ==
Drivers' Championship standings

	Pos.	Driver	Points
	1	(United Kingdom) George Russell	51
	2	(Italy) Kimi Antonelli	47
	3	(Monaco) Charles Leclerc	34
	4	(United Kingdom) Lewis Hamilton	33
2	5	(United Kingdom) Oliver Bearman	17

Constructors' Championship standings

	Pos.	Constructor	Points
	1	(Germany) Mercedes	98
	2	(Italy) Ferrari	67
	3	(United Kingdom) McLaren-Mercedes	18
1	4	(United States) Haas-Ferrari	17
1	5	(Austria) Red Bull Racing-Red Bull Ford	12

- Note: Only the top five positions are included for both sets of standings.

== Notes ==
Previous race: 2026 Australian Grand Prix	FIA Formula One World Championship; 2026 season	Next race: 2026 Japanese Grand Prix
Previous race: 2025 Chinese Grand Prix	Chinese Grand Prix	Next race: 2027 Chinese Grand Prix
