= Red Bull Racing RB22 =

2026 Formula One car

- Max Verstappen driving the RB22 at the 2026 Austrian Grand Prix
- Category: Formula One
- Constructor: Red Bull Racing
- Designers: Pierre Waché (Technical Director); Ben Waterhouse (Head of Performance Engineering); Paul Monaghan (Chief Engineer, Car Engineering); Craig Skinner (Chief Designer); Jerome Lafarge (Chief Designer, Composites and Structures); Edward Aveling (Chief Designer, Mechanical and Systems); Alistair Brizell (Head of Vehicle Performance); Enrico Balbo (Head of Aerodynamics); Craig Dear (Head of Aerodynamics Development); Ben Hodgkinson (Technical Director - Power Unit)
- Predecessor: Red Bull RB21

Technical specifications
- Suspension (front): Multi-link pull-rod actuated dampers and anti-roll bar
- Suspension (rear): Double wishbone push-rod springs, dampers, and anti-roll bar
- Engine: Red Bull Ford DM01 1.6 L (98 cu in) direct injection V6 turbocharged engine limited to 15,000 rpm in a rear mid-mounted, rear-wheel-drive layout
- Weight: 770 kg (including driver, coolant and oil)
- Fuel: Esso / Mobil Synergy
- Lubricants: Mobil 1
- Tyres: Pirelli P Zero (Dry); Pirelli Cinturato (Wet)

Competition history
- Notable entrants: Oracle Red Bull Racing
- Notable drivers: 3. (Netherlands) Max Verstappen; 6. (France) Isack Hadjar; 30. (New Zealand) Liam Lawson
- Debut: 2026 Australian Grand Prix
- First win: 2026 Bahrain Grand Prix
- Last win: 2026 Las Vegas Grand Prix
- Last event: 2026 Las Vegas Grand Prix
Races	Wins	Podiums	Poles	F/Laps
21	4	16	3	2

The Red Bull Racing RB22 is a Formula One car designed and built by Red Bull Racing to compete in the 2026 Formula One World Championship. It is currently being driven by four-time World Champion Max Verstappen and Isack Hadjar, in his first season with Red Bull after his debut season with Racing Bulls the previous year. The RB22 is the first Red Bull Racing car to be powered by a Ford-branded power unit, and marks Ford's return to the sport after the sale of the Jaguar team to Red Bull GmbH at the end of the 2004 season. Technical Director Pierre Waché oversees the chassis development for the RB22 with Technical Director Ben Hodgkinson of Red Bull Ford Powertrains overseeing the engine development.

Red Bull had a shaky opening to the season, with handling and reliability issues compromising the team's performance. Mid-season upgrades brought the team back to podium contention, with a late-season upgrade allowing the team to take its first few wins of the season.

== Background ==
=== Regulation changes ===
For 2026, the Formula One regulations received significant changes revolving around the car's aerodynamics and engine. Due to this, the RB22 features significant changes from its predecessor, the RB21. The RB22 is the first Red Bull car since the RB14 of 2018 to not be powered by a Honda power unit, following the Japanese manufacturer's move to Aston Martin as its works engine partner.

=== Livery ===
A bespoke event was held on 15 January 2026 in Detroit to unveil the RB22 and VCARB 03. The livery marked a change from the matte dark navy blue of previous cars to a glossy blue and black colour scheme, accompanied with a "jacquard" pattern.

== Competition and development history ==
=== Opening rounds ===
After a decent start to the weekend at the 2026 Australian Grand Prix, Verstappen crashed in the first qualifying session, and did not set a time. Meanwhile, Hadjar qualified 3rd, behind the Mercedes duo, in his debut race for the premier team. During the race, Hadjar had an engine problem on lap 11, and retired. Verstappen finished the race in 6th position, behind reigning champion Lando Norris. The team did not fare better at the Chinese Grand Prix: finishing outside the points during the sprint, the Red Bulls found themselves outqualified by the Alpine of former Red Bull junior Pierre Gasly, and Verstappen suffered gearbox issues that forced a retirement while Hadjar finished behind Oliver Bearman (Haas), Gasly, and sister team driver and former Red Bull seat holder Liam Lawson. The team dropped to fifth behind Haas. In Japan, Pierre Gasly kept Verstappen at bay in the majority of the race, thus staying in 7th, with Hadjar in 12th behind Nico Hülkenberg's Audi.

Due to the Bahrain and Saudi Arabian Grands Prix being cancelled, Red Bull was one of the teams that brought upgrades to the next outing in Miami. Verstappen fared better as he got points both from the sprint and the main race but Hadjar, who had originally qualified in the top 10 but was then disqualified due to a technical infringement and started the race from the pit lane, faced a difficult weekend as he crashed on lap 6 at the main race. The next Grand Prix in Canada, was once again a sprint weekend with Verstappen finishing 7th and Hadjar 21st. In the main race, Verstappen claimed Red Bull's first podium in 2026, finishing 3rd and Hadjar finishing 5th, despite having a ten-second time penalty when battling Charles Leclerc.

Monaco was a mixed weekend for the team, with Verstappen qualifying behind Antonelli's Mercedes on the front row, and then having his powertrain fail in the formation lap, and Hadjar qualifying 5th, and finished the race in 3rd to achieve his first podium with Red Bull and second in the sport. Barcelona was an average weekend, with Verstappen qualifying in 4th and finishing the race in 4th, and Hadjar qualifying 5th and finishing the race in 6th.

In Austria, Hadjar qualified in 8th and finished 6th, while Verstappen - who despite a late Q3 crash, would qualify P5 - would ultimately fall short of the win to Russell by 1.611 seconds. Following that was Britain, where Hadjar was the fastest Red Bull in qualifying, settling in P5 with his teammate two places behind. The race was average for the Frenchman, while Verstappen was set for a P3 finish until lap 50, where he spun out at the end of Wellington Straight and went into the gravel.

Belgium was a solid weekend for the team, with Verstappen qualifying 2nd and finishing the race in 3rd, and Hadjar going from P21 due to a powertrain penalty to finish P6. Hungary was another solid drive for the Dutchman, who would qualify fourth and finish second, and with Hadjar going from P8 to P6, the team earned a tidy haul of points.

=== Mid-season rounds ===
In the Netherlands, Verstappen crashed on the first lap while Lawson took Hadjar's place due to a wrist injury and finished 7th. The next Grand Prix in Italy was better for Verstappen, challenging the Mercedes duo of Kimi Antonelli and George Russell in the first half of the race and finishing 3rd, while Lawson was in an incident with Nico Hülkenberg and finished 14th. Madrid was a better race for the team, with Verstappen finishing 2nd and Lawson overtaking Franco Colapinto for 6th.

Azerbaijan saw Hadjar return from his wrist injury and Lawson back in the VCARB. It also saw Hadjar outqualify his teammate, qualifying 4th while Verstappen qualified 8th. The two would go on to work their way up to the podium places behind race winner Russell, with Verstappen being 0.196 seconds from the victory due to a late yellow flag that caught Russell out on the last lap, and Hadjar 3rd after a solid drive. The next weekend was Bahrain, which due to the 2026 Iran War, was held at the Sepang International Circuit in Malaysia, being the first race at the circuit since the 2017 Malaysian Grand Prix. Verstappen would claim his first pole position of the season and his first since Abu Dhabi the previous year. Despite rain delaying the start of the race by 93 minutes and half of the cars stopping in the initial formation lap due to a software glitch, the race would go ahead. While he was jumped by the Mercedes duo at the start of the race, he worked his way back in front and would win the race, taking his and Red Bull's first win in 2026, his 72nd Grand Prix win, and the first win for Ford as a powertrain manufacturer since the 2003 Brazilian Grand Prix. Following that was Singapore, where Verstappen took sprint pole, won the sprint, took his 50th pole position, and then led every lap of the Grand Prix to take his first win in Marina Bay, while Hadjar finished 10th after a pit lane start, thanks to a powertrain failure in Q1.

== Complete Formula One results ==
Key

Key
Colour	Result
Gold	Winner
Silver	Second place
Bronze	Third place
Green	Other points position
Blue	Other classified position
Blue	Not classified, finished (NC)
Purple	Not classified, retired (Ret)
Red	Did not qualify (DNQ)
Black	Disqualified (DSQ)
White	Did not start (DNS)
White	Race cancelled (C)
Blank	Did not practice (DNP)
Blank	Excluded (EX)
Blank	Did not arrive (DNA)
Blank	Withdrawn (WD)
Blank	Did not enter (empty cell)
Annotation	Meaning
P	Pole position
F	Fastest lap
Superscript number	Points-scoring position in sprint

Year	Entrant	Power unit	Tyres	Driver name	Grands Prix																							Points	WCC pos.
Year	Entrant	Power unit	Tyres	Driver name	AUS	CHN	JPN	MIA	CAN	MON	BCN	AUT	GBR	BEL	HUN	NED	ITA	ESP	AZE	BHR	SIN	USA	MXC	SAP	LVG	QAT	ABU	Points	WCC pos.
2026	Red Bull Racing	Red Bull Ford DM01; 1.6 V6 t	P	(Netherlands) Max Verstappen	6^{F}	Ret	8	5^{5}	3^{7}	Ret	4	2	20†^{6}	3	2	Ret^{6}	3	2	2	1^{P}^{F}	1^{1 P}	3	1	2	1^{P}			440*	3rd*
2026	Red Bull Racing	Red Bull Ford DM01; 1.6 V6 t	P	(France) Isack Hadjar	Ret	8	12	Ret	5	3	6	6	5	6	6				3	5	10	6	9	3	15			440*	3rd*
2026	Red Bull Racing	Red Bull Ford DM01; 1.6 V6 t	P	(New Zealand) Liam Lawson												7	14	6										440*	3rd*

* Season still in progress.
