= Racing Bulls VCARB 03 =

2026 Formula One car

- Arvid Lindblad driving the Racing Bulls VCARB 03 at the 2026 Austrian Grand Prix
- Category: Formula One
- Constructor: Racing Bulls
- Designers: Tim Goss (Chief Technical Officer); Guillaume Cattelani (Deputy Technical Director - Performance); Andrea Landi (Deputy Technical Director - Car Design); Paolo Marabini (Chief Designer); Guillaume Dezoteux (Head of Vehicle Performance); Guru Johl (Head of Aerodynamics); Tom Coughlan (Chief Aerodynamicist); Ben Hodgkinson (Technical Director, Power Unit - Red Bull)
- Predecessor: Racing Bulls VCARB 02

Technical specifications
- Chassis: Carbon-fibre monocoque and Halo safety cockpit protection device
- Width: 1,900 mm (74.8 in)
- Wheelbase: 3,400 mm (133.9 in)
- Engine: Red Bull Ford DM01 1.6 L (98 cu in)
- Electric motor: Ford Kinetic and thermal energy recovery systems
- Transmission: Red Bull Technology 8 plus 1 reverse
- Battery: Ford-Lithium-ion-battery
- Weight: 770 kg (including driver, excluding fuel)
- Fuel: Esso / Mobil Synergy
- Lubricants: Mobil 1
- Brakes: Brembo 6-piston aluminium-lithium calipers, Brembo carbon discs and carbon pads
- Tyres: Pirelli P Zero (Dry); Pirelli Cinturato (Wet)
- Clutch: Hydraulically-activated carbon multiplate

Competition history
- Notable entrants: Visa Cash App Racing Bulls F1 Team
- Notable drivers: 30. (New Zealand) Liam Lawson; 41. (United Kingdom) Arvid Lindblad; 22. (Japan) Yuki Tsunoda
- Debut: 2026 Australian Grand Prix
- Last event: 2026 Mexico City Grand Prix
Races	Wins	Podiums	Poles	F/Laps
19	0	0	0	0

The Racing Bulls VCARB 03 is a Formula One car designed and built by Racing Bulls to compete in the 2026 Formula One World Championship. It is being driven by Liam Lawson and Arvid Lindblad, the latter in his first Formula One season.

== Background ==
=== Development ===
The VCARB 03's foundations and technical direction were laid by former technical director Jody Egginton with subsequent design and development led by chief technical officer Tim Goss and deputy technical directors Guillaume Cattelani and Andrea Landi , the VCARB 03 is drastically different to its predecessor due to the 2026 Formula One regulation changes. The VCARB 03 debuted at Imola in January 2026 and featured in the shakedown test in Barcelona in the same month.

=== Sponsorship and livery ===
The VCARB 03 livery was revealed during a live event at Detroit, the home of Ford, alongside its sister team Red Bull Racing on 15 January 2026. The car maintains the "Racing Bulls" identity with a heavy emphasis on white and blue. Title sponsors Visa and Cash App remain prominent on the sidepods and engine cover. The 2026 livery introduced more exposed carbon fiber to save weight.

At the Japanese Grand Prix the car ran in a cherry-coloured livery to promote a new flavour produced by the energy drink manufacturer. Having been designed in collaboration with Japanese calligrapher Bisen Aoyagi. Inspired by the Red Bull Spring Edition and traditional Japanese shodo brush art, the design includes "Give You Wiiings". A new livery featuring a predominantly yellow colour was presented for the Miami Grand Prix as part of the Red Bull Summer Edition series. At the Barcelona-Catalunya Grand Prix the team rolled out a special, football-inspired livery dubbed "VCARB FC," the design celebrating the 2026 FIFA World Cup.

== Competition history ==
The VCARB 03 made its competitive debut at the 2026 Australian Grand Prix.

In the Netherlands, Yuki Tsunoda substituted for Lawson, who replaced Isack Hadjar at Red Bull Racing due to a wrist injury. Tsunoda and Lindblad finishing the race in 11th and 12th.

== Complete Formula One results ==
Key

Key
Colour	Result
Gold	Winner
Silver	Second place
Bronze	Third place
Green	Other points position
Blue	Other classified position
Blue	Not classified, finished (NC)
Purple	Not classified, retired (Ret)
Red	Did not qualify (DNQ)
Black	Disqualified (DSQ)
White	Did not start (DNS)
White	Race cancelled (C)
Blank	Did not practice (DNP)
Blank	Excluded (EX)
Blank	Did not arrive (DNA)
Blank	Withdrawn (WD)
Blank	Did not enter (empty cell)
Annotation	Meaning
P	Pole position
F	Fastest lap
Superscript number	Points-scoring position in sprint

Year	Entrant	Power unit	Tyres	Driver name	Grands Prix																							Points	WCC pos.
Year	Entrant	Power unit	Tyres	Driver name	AUS	CHN	JPN	MIA	CAN	MON	BCN	AUT	GBR	BEL	HUN	NED	ITA	ESP	AZE	BHR	SIN	USA	MXC	SAP	LVG	QAT	ABU	Points	WCC pos.
2026	Racing Bulls	Red Bull Ford DM01; 1.6 V6 t	P	(New Zealand) Liam Lawson	13	7^{7}	9	Ret	7	5	8	9	6^{8}	12	8				12	7	7^{5}	9	7					108*	5th*
2026	Racing Bulls	Red Bull Ford DM01; 1.6 V6 t	P	(United Kingdom) Arvid Lindblad	8	12	14	14	DNS^{8}	6	9	10	7	9	10	12	8	9	7	10	15	12	Ret					108*	5th*
2026	Racing Bulls	Red Bull Ford DM01; 1.6 V6 t	P	(Japan) Yuki Tsunoda												11	10	14										108*	5th*

* Season still in progress.
