= Red Bull Ford V6 hybrid Formula One power unit =

Red Bull Ford V6 turbo-hybrid power unit

Overview
- Manufacturer: Red Bull Powertrains
- Designer: Ben Hodgkinson (Technical Director); Phil Prew (Engineering Director)
- Production: 2026–present

Layout
- Configuration: V6 single hybrid turbocharged engine, 90° cylinder angle
- Displacement: 1.6 L (98 cu in)
- Cylinder bore: 80 mm (3.15 in)
- Piston stroke: 53 mm (2.09 in)
- Cylinder block material: Aluminium alloy
- Cylinder head material: Aluminium alloy
- Valvetrain: 24-valve (four-valves per cylinder), DOHC
- Compression ratio: 16:1

RPM range
- Max. engine speed: 15,000 rpm

Combustion
- Turbocharger: turbocharger
- Fuel system: gasoline direct injection
- Fuel type: "Advanced sustainable" Esso Synergy
- Oil system: Dry sump
- Cooling system: Single water pump

The Red Bull Ford V6 hybrid Formula One power unit is a series of 1.6-litre, hybrid turbocharged V6 racing engines which features a kinetic energy recovery system (MGU-K) that provides nearly half the horsepower of the power unit. Developed and produced by Red Bull Powertrains in partnership with the Ford Motor Company for use in Formula One, the engines have been used by Red Bull Racing and Racing Bulls since the 2026 season.

== List of models ==
Engine specifications of the Red Bull Ford Formula 1 hybrid V6 engine
Season	Name	Layout	Max. Total system output (est.)	Notes
2026	DM01	1.6 L 90° V6 turbo hybrid	Internal Combustion Engine 400 kW (540 hp); Energy Recovery System 350 kW (470 hp); Total 750 kW (1,010 hp)	

== See also ==
- Audi V6 hybrid Formula One power unit
- Ferrari V6 hybrid Formula One power unit
- Honda V6 hybrid Formula One power unit
- Mercedes V6 hybrid Formula One power unit
