= Red Bull Powertrains =

Formula One power unit manufacturer

Red Bull Powertrains Limited
- Type: Subsidiary
- Industry: Automotive
- Founded: 16 February 2021; 5 years ago
- Founders: Helmut Marko; Christian Horner
- Headquarters: Milton Keynes, England
- Key people: Laurent Mekies (CEO); Ben Hodgkinson (Technical Director); Phil Prew (Engineering Director)
- Parent: Red Bull GmbH
- Website: www.redbullpowertrains.com

Red Bull Powertrains as a Formula One engine manufacturer
Formula One World Championship career
- First entry: 2022 Bahrain Grand Prix
- Last entry: 2022 Abu Dhabi Grand Prix
- Races entered: 22 (22 starts)
- Chassis: Red Bull Racing, AlphaTauri
- Constructors' Championships: 1 (2022)
- Drivers' Championships: 1 (2022)
- Race victories: 17
- Podiums: 28
- Points: 794
- Pole positions: 8
- Fastest laps: 8

Red Bull Ford as a Formula One engine manufacturer
Formula One World Championship career
- First entry: 2026 Australian Grand Prix
- Last entry: 2026 United States Grand Prix
- Races entered: 18 (18 starts)
- Chassis: Red Bull Racing, Racing Bulls
- Race victories: 2
- Podiums: 12
- Points: 457
- Pole positions: 2
- Fastest laps: 2

Red Bull Powertrains Limited (RBPT) is a Formula One power unit manufacturing company owned by the Austrian Red Bull GmbH and based in the United Kingdom. The company was formed in 2021 to take over the operation of Formula One power units developed by Honda from 2022 onwards following the Japanese manufacturer's withdrawal from the sport after 2021. Red Bull Powertrains has full responsibility for engine supply and operations for both Red Bull-owned teams from 2026, when it was rebranded to Red Bull Ford Powertrains, following a partnership with the Ford Motor Company.

Red Bull Powertrains operates in a 5,000-square-foot facility next to the Red Bull Racing chassis department in Milton Keynes. Besides Ferrari, Red Bull is the only other current F1 team to have both the chassis and engine departments at the same location.

== History ==
In February 2021, Red Bull Advanced Technologies signed an exclusive distribution agreement for Formula One engines with Honda to start in the 2022 season, after the Japanese automaker left Formula One at the end of the 2021 season. The engines were to be purchased from Honda and renamed Red Bull Powertrains units, and supplied to its two teams currently competing in Formula One, Red Bull Racing and AlphaTauri, starting in 2022. Honda continued to support the Red Bull-owned teams between 2022 until the end of 2025, assembling the power units and providing trackside and race operation support. The power units remained Honda's intellectual property, and due to the F1 engine development freeze in place since September 2022, Red Bull Powertrains did not develop them.

On 23 April 2021 Red Bull Powertrains announced the hiring of Ben Hodgkinson as technical director. Hodgkinson had been head of mechanical engineering at Mercedes AMG High Performance Powertrains since 2017, and had worked at the Brixworth factory for 20 years. On 6 May 2021, Red Bull Racing announced the hiring of five more senior Mercedes engine employees: Steve Blewett (who will be the production director of the Red Bull power unit), Omid Mostaghimi (chief engine, electronics and energy recovery), Pip Clode (head of mechanical design for energy recovery), Anton Mayo (head of combustion power unit design) and Steve Brodie (leader of combustion engine operations).

On 2 October 2022, Honda announced an agreement for the "re-strengthening" of their partnership with Red Bull Racing and will maintain total oversight of the engines until 2025. Honda's logo will also reappear on Red Bull Racing's and AlphaTauri's car from the 2022 Japanese Grand Prix onwards.

On 4 February 2023, Red Bull Racing and the Ford Motor Company announced a strategic partnership that will see Ford return to Formula One in 2026 following new engine regulations. Ford will provide "expertise in areas including battery cell and electric motor technology as well as power unit control software and analytics" and "combustion engine development," and the company will be renamed to Red Bull Ford Powertrains.

=== Re-badged Honda power units (2022–2025) ===
==== RBPTH001 ====
The RBPTH001 was, despite its name, developed, produced, and maintained by Honda. It was a derivative of the Honda RA621H, with different ignition timing, cylinder pressure, and MGU-H to account for the new E10 fuels. The crankshaft and cylinder block geometry were also modified to ensure reliability when running on E10 fuels, and a specialised coating developed by Honda's motorcycle division was applied to the walls of the cylinders. The injection system, exhaust, and the turbocharger's compressor and turbine were all optimised for E10 fuel. The changes meant that the RBPTH001 weighed more than the RA621H, but the dimensions of the engines are virtually identical save for the exhaust and intake layout and the electrical components. The new engine could also run at noticeably higher temperatures compared to the RA621H. Despite the reduced energy density of the 2022 fuels, the RBPTH001 had greater thermal efficiency than its predecessor.

=== Red Bull Ford power units (2026–) ===
In December 2025, it was announced that the Red Bull Powertrains-Ford naming was simplified to Red Bull Ford.

==== DM01 ====
Red Bull Ford launched the DM01 on 15 January 2026. The power unit was named after the late Red Bull GmbH founder Dietrich Mateschitz. Prior to his death in 2022, Mateschitz was heavily involved in setting up RBPT.

== Formula One engine results ==
Key

Key
Colour	Result
Gold	Winner
Silver	Second place
Bronze	Third place
Green	Other points position
Blue	Other classified position
Blue	Not classified, finished (NC)
Purple	Not classified, retired (Ret)
Red	Did not qualify (DNQ)
Black	Disqualified (DSQ)
White	Did not start (DNS)
White	Race cancelled (C)
Blank	Did not practice (DNP)
Blank	Excluded (EX)
Blank	Did not arrive (DNA)
Blank	Withdrawn (WD)
Blank	Did not enter (empty cell)
Annotation	Meaning
P	Pole position
F	Fastest lap
Superscript number	Points-scoring position in sprint

=== As Red Bull Powertrains (2022) ===
Year	Entrant	Chassis	Engine	Drivers	Grands Prix																						Points	WCC
Year	Entrant	Chassis	Engine	Drivers	BHR	SAU	AUS	EMI	MIA	ESP	MON	AZE	CAN	GBR	AUT	FRA	HUN	BEL	NED	ITA	SIN	JPN	USA	MXC	SAP	ABU	Points	WCC
2022	Oracle Red Bull Racing	RB18	RBPTH001; 1.6 V6 t	(Mexico) Sergio Pérez	18†	4^{P}	2	2^{3}	4	2^{F}	1	2^{F}	Ret	2	Ret^{5}	4	5	2	5	6^{F}	1	2	4	3	7^{5}	3	759	1st
2022	Oracle Red Bull Racing	RB18	RBPTH001; 1.6 V6 t	(Netherlands) Max Verstappen	19†	1	Ret	1^{P 1 F}	1^{F}	1	3	1	1^{P}	7	2^{P 1 F}	1	1	1^{F}	1^{P}^{F}	1	7	1^{P}	1	1^{P}	6^{4}	1^{P}	759	1st
2022	Scuderia AlphaTauri	AT03	RBPTH001; 1.6 V6 t	(France) Pierre Gasly	Ret	8	9	12	Ret	13	11	5	14	Ret	15	12	12	9	11	8	10	18	14	11	14	14	35	9th
2022	Scuderia AlphaTauri	AT03	RBPTH001; 1.6 V6 t	(Japan) Yuki Tsunoda	8	DNS	15	7	12	10	17	13	Ret	14	16	Ret	19	13	Ret	14	Ret	13	10	Ret	17	11	35	9th

Notes

- † – Retired before completion, but classified as more than 90% of the race distance was completed.

=== As Red Bull Ford (2026–present) ===
Year	Entrant	Chassis	Engine	Drivers	Grands Prix																							Points	WCC
Year	Entrant	Chassis	Engine	Drivers	AUS	CHN	JPN	MIA	CAN	MON	BCN	AUT	GBR	BEL	HUN	NED	ITA	ESP	AZE	BHR	SIN	USA	MXC	SAP	LVG	QAT	ABU	Points	WCC
2026	Oracle Red Bull Racing	RB22	DM01; 1.6 V6 t	(Netherlands) Max Verstappen	6^{F}	Ret	8	5^{5}	3^{7}	Ret	4	2	20†^{6}	3	2	Ret^{6}	3	2	2	1^{P}^{F}	1^{1 P}	3						355*	3rd*
2026	Oracle Red Bull Racing	RB22	DM01; 1.6 V6 t	(France) Isack Hadjar	Ret	8	12	Ret	5	3	6	6	5	6	6				3	5	10	6						355*	3rd*
2026	Oracle Red Bull Racing	RB22	DM01; 1.6 V6 t	(New Zealand) Liam Lawson												7	14	6										355*	3rd*
2026	Visa Cash App Racing Bulls F1 Team	VCARB 03	DM01; 1.6 V6 t	(New Zealand) Liam Lawson	13	7^{7}	9	Ret	7	5	8	9	6^{8}	12	8				12	7	7^{5}	9						102*	5th*
2026	Visa Cash App Racing Bulls F1 Team	VCARB 03	DM01; 1.6 V6 t	(United Kingdom) Arvid Lindblad	8	12	14	14	DNS^{8}	6	9	10	7	9	10	12	8	9	7	10	15	12						102*	5th*
2026	Visa Cash App Racing Bulls F1 Team	VCARB 03	DM01; 1.6 V6 t	(Japan) Yuki Tsunoda												11	10	14										102*	5th*

Notes

- * – Season still in progress.
