= Phil Prew =

British engineer

Philip Prew
- Born: Philip Prew
- Occupation: Engineer
- Years active: 1997-present
- Employer: Red Bull Powertrains
- Known for: Formula One engineer
- Title: Engineering director

Philip Prew is a British Formula One engineer. He is currently the engineering director of Red Bull Powertrains. He is also known for engineering Lewis Hamilton to his maiden F1 title in 2008.

== Career ==
Prew began his engineering career in 1993 as a project engineer at Ricardo, working on automotive programmes before moving into Formula One with McLaren Racing in 1997. He initially worked as a vehicle dynamics engineer, before serving as performance engineer to Mika Häkkinen during McLaren's championship-winning campaigns in 1998 and 1999. He remained with the Finn for 2000 before being promoted to serve as race engineer for David Coulthard in 2001. He worked with the scot for four seasons, winning several races along the way.

He then moved to engineer Juan Pablo Montoya for 2005 and the first part of 2006 before the Colombian quit the sport. He finished the season with reserve driver Pedro de la Rosa. Prew became race engineer to Lewis Hamilton in 2007, supporting Hamilton across his first three seasons in Formula One, including Hamilton's 2008 World Drivers’ Championship victory. Prew remained in the role until 2009, before being moved to oversee both race engineering teams as Principal Race Engineer for 2010.

In 2013, Prew became chief engineer at McLaren, overseeing the technical and operational direction of the team's trackside engineering group until 2016. He then joined Mercedes AMG High Performance Powertrains as chief engineer, taking a senior role in the development and track support of Mercedes’ hybrid Formula One power units. Prew later moved to Red Bull Powertrains as technical operations director, leading trackside operations for the organisation's inaugural Formula One power unit programme ahead of the 2026 regulations. At the start of the 2026 season, Prew was promoted to Engineering Director.
