= 2026 Singapore Grand Prix =

Seventeenth round of the 2026 F1 season

Race 17 of 23 in the 2026 Formula One World Championship
← Previous race	Next race →
- Layout of the Marina Bay Street Circuit

Race details
- Date: 11 October 2026
- Official name: Formula 1 Singapore Airlines Singapore Grand Prix 2026
- Location: Marina Bay Street Circuit; Marina Bay, Singapore
- Course: Temporary street circuit
- Course length: 4.927 km (3.061 miles)
- Distance: 62 laps, 305.337 km (189.727 miles)
- Weather: Partly cloudy. Max. ambient temp. 30.5°C, max. track temp. 44.3°C.
- Attendance: 301,294

Pole position
Driver	(Netherlands) Max Verstappen	Red Bull Racing-Red Bull Ford
- Time: 1:31.373

Fastest lap
Driver	(Monaco) Charles Leclerc	Ferrari
- Time: 1:35.202 on lap 41

Podium
First	(Netherlands) Max Verstappen	Red Bull Racing-Red Bull Ford
Second	(Monaco) Charles Leclerc	Ferrari
Third	(Italy) Kimi Antonelli	Mercedes

The 2026 Singapore Grand Prix (officially known as the Formula 1 Singapore Airlines Singapore Grand Prix 2026) was a Formula One motor race that was held on 11 October 2026 at the Marina Bay Street Circuit in Marina Bay, Singapore. It was the seventeenth round of the 2026 Formula One World Championship and the sixth and final Grand Prix in the season to utilise the sprint format.

Max Verstappen (Red Bull) took pole and the win for both the sprint and main races. In the sprint race, championship-contender George Russell (Mercedes) had the lead before crashing at the end of the second lap. In the main race, Verstappen lead throughout with Charles Leclerc (Ferrari) and championship-leader Kimi Antonelli (Mercedes) second and third.

== Background ==
The event was held at the Marina Bay Street Circuit in Marina Bay for the 17th time in the circuit's history, across the weekend of 9–11 October. The Grand Prix was the seventeenth round of the 2026 Formula One World Championship and the 17th running of the Singapore Grand Prix as a round of the Formula One World Championship. It was also the sixth and final Grand Prix in the season to utilise the sprint format and the first time that the Singapore Grand Prix featured it.

=== Championship standings before the race ===
Going into the weekend, Kimi Antonelli led the Drivers' Championship with 320 points, 84 points ahead of teammate George Russell in second and 106 ahead of Lewis Hamilton in third. Mercedes, with 556 points, led the Constructors' Championship from Ferrari and McLaren, who were second and third with 405 and 316 points, respectively.

=== Entrants ===
The drivers and teams were the same as the season entry list with no additional stand-in drivers for the race.

=== Tyre choices ===
Tyre supplier Pirelli selected the C3, C4, and C5 tyre compounds—the softest three in its range, designated hard, medium, and soft, respectively—for teams to use at the event.

== Practice ==
The sole free practice session was held on 9 October 2026, at 16:30 local time (UTC+8), and was topped by George Russell (Mercedes) ahead of Charles Leclerc (Ferrari) and Lando Norris (McLaren).

== Sprint qualifying ==
Sprint qualifying was held on 9 October 2026, at 20:30 local time (UTC+8), and determined the starting grid order for the sprint.

=== Sprint qualifying classification ===
Pos.	No.	Driver	Constructor	Qualifying times			Sprint grid
Pos.	No.	Driver	Constructor	SQ1	SQ2	SQ3	Sprint grid
1	3	(Netherlands) Max Verstappen	Red Bull Racing-Red Bull Ford	1:33.477	1:32.701	1:31.156	1
2	63	(United Kingdom) George Russell	Mercedes	1:33.573	1:32.614	1:31.276	2
3	16	(Monaco) Charles Leclerc	Ferrari	1:33.495	1:32.246	1:31.399	3
4	81	(Australia) Oscar Piastri	McLaren-Mercedes	1:34.277	1:33.106	1:31.454	4
5	1	(United Kingdom) Lando Norris	McLaren-Mercedes	1:34.257	1:32.572	1:31.587	5
6	44	(United Kingdom) Lewis Hamilton	Ferrari	1:33.748	1:32.562	1:31.702	6
7	12	(Italy) Kimi Antonelli	Mercedes	1:34.392	1:32.998	1:31.849	7
8	30	(New Zealand) Liam Lawson	Racing Bulls-Red Bull Ford	1:34.855	1:33.133	1:32.341	8
9	6	(France) Isack Hadjar	Red Bull Racing-Red Bull Ford	1:34.182	1:32.947	No time	9
10	10	(France) Pierre Gasly	Alpine-Mercedes	1:34.673	1:33.155	No time	10
11	43	(Argentina) Franco Colapinto	Alpine-Mercedes	1:35.048	1:33.249	N/A	11
12	27	(Germany) Nico Hülkenberg	Audi	1:34.128	1:33.420	N/A	12
13	87	(United Kingdom) Oliver Bearman	Haas-Ferrari	1:34.950	1:33.423	N/A	13
14	5	(Brazil) Gabriel Bortoleto	Audi	1:34.690	1:33.466	N/A	14
15	14	(Spain) Fernando Alonso	Aston Martin Aramco-Honda	1:34.960	1:33.734	N/A	15
16	31	(France) Esteban Ocon	Haas-Ferrari	1:35.004	1:34.368	N/A	16
17	41	(United Kingdom) Arvid Lindblad	Racing Bulls-Red Bull Ford	1:35.136	N/A	N/A	17
18	18	(Canada) Lance Stroll	Aston Martin Aramco-Honda	1:35.662	N/A	N/A	18
19	23	(Thailand) Alexander Albon	Atlassian Williams-Mercedes	1:36.130	N/A	N/A	19
20	11	(Mexico) Sergio Pérez	Cadillac-Ferrari	1:36.760	N/A	N/A	20
21	77	(Finland) Valtteri Bottas	Cadillac-Ferrari	1:36.868	N/A	N/A	21
22	55	(Spain) Carlos Sainz Jr.	Atlassian Williams-Mercedes	1:37.376	N/A	N/A	PL^{a}
107% time: 1:40.020

Notes

- ^a – Carlos Sainz Jr. qualified 22nd, but was required to start the sprint from the pit lane as his car was modified under parc fermé conditions.

== Sprint ==
The sprint was held on 10 October 2026, and was scheduled to start at 17:00 local time (UTC+8), before being delayed to 17:30 due to heavy rain affecting the track. It was reduced from 21 to 20 laps.

=== Sprint report ===
After two formation laps that led to a standing start, George Russell (Mercedes) took the lead from polesitter Max Verstappen (Red Bull) into the first corner. At the end of the second lap, Russell ran over the white line marking the edge of the track. The wet conditions had made the line slippery and Russell span as a result, hiting the barrier, resulting in terminal damage. There were several other retirements and incidents across the opening two laps and subsequent safety car period: Sergio Pérez (Cadillac) hit Lance Stroll (Aston Martin) at turn 16, Isack Hadjar (Red Bull) retired after dropping positions early on due to power unit failures, and Franco Colapinto (Alpine) retired due to a communications issue with his car. Arvid Lindblad (Racing Bulls) spun to last place, he recovered to thirteenth by the finish.

The safety car ended on lap 6. Alexander Albon (Williams) hit Gabriel Bortoleto (Audi), causing the Brazilian driver to retire alongside Valtteri Bottas (Cadillac). Albon himself retired soon afterward. On the final lap Lando Norris attempted to overtake Oscar Piastri (both McLaren) up the inside of turn 5, the pair made contact and both drivers spun. As a result, Norris dropped to eighth and Piastri retired. The incident was investigated by the stewards, who did not impose any penalties. Verstappen won his first sprint of the season, and Lewis Hamilton (Ferrari) finished second ahead of teammate Charles Leclerc, who inherited third.

=== Sprint classification ===
Pos.	No.	Driver	Constructor	Laps	Time/Retired	Grid	Points
1	3	(Netherlands) Max Verstappen	Red Bull Racing-Red Bull Ford	20	39:48.162	1	8
2	44	(United Kingdom) Lewis Hamilton	Ferrari	20	+2.591	6	7
3	16	(Monaco) Charles Leclerc	Ferrari	20	+16.871	3	6
4	12	(Italy) Kimi Antonelli	Mercedes	20	+17.238	7	5
5	30	(New Zealand) Liam Lawson	Racing Bulls-Red Bull Ford	20	+20.632	8	4
6	87	(United Kingdom) Oliver Bearman	Haas-Ferrari	20	+24.321	13	3
7	27	(Germany) Nico Hülkenberg	Audi	20	+27.525	12	2
8	1	(United Kingdom) Lando Norris	McLaren-Mercedes	20	+28.272	5	1
9	10	(France) Pierre Gasly	Alpine-Mercedes	20	+36.220	10	
10	31	(France) Esteban Ocon	Haas-Ferrari	20	+37.640	16	
11	14	(Spain) Fernando Alonso	Aston Martin Aramco-Honda	20	+50.464	15	
12	55	(Spain) Carlos Sainz Jr.	Atlassian Williams-Mercedes	20	+52.467	PL	
13	41	(United Kingdom) Arvid Lindblad	Racing Bulls-Red Bull Ford	20	+55.792	17	
14^{a}	81	(Australia) Oscar Piastri	McLaren-Mercedes	19	Collision	4	
Ret	23	(Thailand) Alexander Albon	Atlassian Williams-Mercedes	14	Collision damage	19	
Ret	5	(Brazil) Gabriel Bortoleto	Audi	6	Collision	14	
Ret	77	(Finland) Valtteri Bottas	Cadillac-Ferrari	6	Collision	21	
Ret	6	(France) Isack Hadjar	Red Bull Racing-Red Bull Ford	2	Power loss	9	
Ret	43	(Argentina) Franco Colapinto	Alpine-Mercedes	2	Engine	11	
Ret	63	(United Kingdom) George Russell	Mercedes	1	Accident	2	
Ret	11	(Mexico) Sergio Pérez	Cadillac-Ferrari	1	Collision damage	20	
Ret	18	(Canada) Lance Stroll	Aston Martin Aramco-Honda	0	Collision	18	

Notes

- ^a – Oscar Piastri was classified as he completed more than 90% of the sprint distance.

== Qualifying ==
Qualifying was held on 10 October 2026, and was scheduled to start at 21:00 local time (UTC+8), before being delayed to 21:30 due to the postponement of the sprint. It determined the starting grid order for the main race.

=== Qualifying classification ===
Pos.	No.	Driver	Constructor	Qualifying times			Final grid
Pos.	No.	Driver	Constructor	Q1	Q2	Q3	Final grid
1	3	(Netherlands) Max Verstappen	Red Bull Racing-Red Bull Ford	1:33.241	1:31.639	1:31.373	1
2	16	(Monaco) Charles Leclerc	Ferrari	1:32.774	1:31.953	1:31.427	2
3	44	(United Kingdom) Lewis Hamilton	Ferrari	1:32.429	1:31.529	1:31.496	3
4	12	(Italy) Kimi Antonelli	Mercedes	1:33.601	1:32.079	1:31.562	4
5	1	(United Kingdom) Lando Norris	McLaren-Mercedes	1:32.775	1:31.895	1:31.712	5
6	63	(United Kingdom) George Russell	Mercedes	1:33.617	1:32.212	1:31.747	19^{a}
7	81	(Australia) Oscar Piastri	McLaren-Mercedes	1:33.076	1:32.245	1:31.860	6
8	10	(France) Pierre Gasly	Alpine-Mercedes	1:33.182	1:32.602	1:32.225	7
9	30	(New Zealand) Liam Lawson	Racing Bulls-Red Bull Ford	1:32.885	1:32.319	1:32.369	8
10	41	(United Kingdom) Arvid Lindblad	Racing Bulls-Red Bull Ford	1:33.288	1:32.498	1:32.781	9
11	27	(Germany) Nico Hülkenberg	Audi	1:33.147	1:32.784	N/A	10
12	87	(United Kingdom) Oliver Bearman	Haas-Ferrari	1:33.356	1:32.908	N/A	11
13	31	(France) Esteban Ocon	Haas-Ferrari	1:33.803	1:33.323	N/A	12
14	55	(Spain) Carlos Sainz Jr.	Atlassian Williams-Mercedes	1:33.774	1:33.526	N/A	13
15	5	(Brazil) Gabriel Bortoleto	Audi	1:34.169	1:33.658	N/A	14
16	43	(Argentina) Franco Colapinto	Alpine-Mercedes	1:33.261	1:33.787	N/A	15
17	14	(Spain) Fernando Alonso	Aston Martin Aramco-Honda	1:34.223	N/A	N/A	PL^{b}
18	23	(Thailand) Alexander Albon	Atlassian Williams-Mercedes	1:34.289	N/A	N/A	16
19	18	(Canada) Lance Stroll	Aston Martin Aramco-Honda	1:34.946	N/A	N/A	PL^{c}
20	11	(Mexico) Sergio Pérez	Cadillac-Ferrari	1:35.123	N/A	N/A	17
21	77	(Finland) Valtteri Bottas	Cadillac-Ferrari	1:35.984	N/A	N/A	18
107% time: 1:38.899
—	6	(France) Isack Hadjar	Red Bull Racing-Red Bull Ford	No time	N/A	N/A	PL^{d}

Notes

- ^a – George Russell received a 60-place grid penalty for exceeding his quota of power unit elements.
- ^b – Fernando Alonso qualified 17th, but was required to start the race from the pit lane as his car was modified under parc fermé conditions.
- ^c – Lance Stroll qualified 19th, but was required to start the race from the pit lane as his car was modified under parc fermé conditions.
- ^d – Isack Hadjar failed to set a time during qualifying. He was allowed to race at the stewards' discretion. He was required to start the race from the pit lane as his car was modified under parc fermé conditions.

== Race ==
The race was held on 11 October 2026, at 20:00 local time (UTC+8), and was run for 62 laps.

=== Race report ===
Prior to the race start, Red Bull's Isack Hadjar and both Aston Martin drivers Fernando Alonso and Lance Stroll were required to start from the pit lane as all had made modifications under parc fermé conditions after Saturday's qualifying, promoting championship contender George Russell to nineteenth on the grid instead of starting 21st.

At the start, both Verstappen and Leclerc got off their respective grid boxes well, with the latter having a slightly better reaction time, enabling him to attack Verstappen heading into turn 1. Verstappen opted to block the attack, allowing him to keep the lead, whilst Hamilton was able to defend his position against Antonelli and both McLaren drivers. On lap seven, Gabriel Bortoleto came to a halt with a gearbox failure, leaving his Audi stranded at the pit lane exit, triggering a virtual safety car (VSC). During the VSC, the pit lane was closed and no driver was able to change tyres. Hamilton, who opted for the medium compound to start the race as opposed to the drivers around him, was initially able to keep up the speed compared to both Verstappen and Leclerc by setting fastest laps, but saw his advantage slip away as both front runners were able to build a substantial gap, before Leclerc then lost ground on Verstappen due to tyre disadvantage.

The race order remained largely unchaged during the middle stage before Stroll caused a second virtual safety car phase by stopping his car with a clutch issue, triggering a series of pit stops including tyre changes for the leading group. Hamilton opted to stay out on worn soft tyres which put him into a vulnerable position heading into the final stages of the race, as he got overtaken by Leclerc, who tried to use his tyre advantage towards Verstappen in an attempt to close the 14-second-gap to the leader with roughly 20 laps to go as Verstappen decided to stay out as well following the second VSC, mainly to maintain the gap he had built up earlier on in order to avoid himself getting undercut by Leclerc.

Hamilton tried to defend attacks from both Norris and Antonelli on lap 54, causing him to go wide after the first turn. Championship leader Antonelli took advantage, as Norris lost momentum heading into the corner complex of two and three after attacking Hamilton, taking fourth place from Norris. Later at the same lap, Antonelli was able to get past Hamilton in order to take third, whilst Norris completed his overtaking attempt towards Hamilton one lap later to claim fourth. On the final lap, Hamilton was overtaken by Piastri in the end for fifth, with the former taking full responsibility for his misjudgement to stay out on old tyres: Ferrari initially planned to pit Hamilton during the second VSC phase in order to secure a podium, which he declined.

With Leclerc being unable to close the gap, Verstappen crossed the line to take an unchallenged win, as he led every single lap of the race after taking pole position on Saturday. The Dutchman was able to take his first Grand Prix victory at the Singapore Grand Prix, his 73rd overall. He was denied a seventh career grand chelem as Leclerc took the fastest lap, with the latter taking second place ahead of Antonelli who claimed his fourteenth podium finish in seventeen races this season. Norris and Piastri settled for fourth and fifth, respectively. Hamilton took the chequered flag in sixth, with Lawson, Hülkenberg, Russell and Hadjar completing the top ten.

=== Post-race and championship impact ===
His second consecutive victory elevated Verstappen to fourth in the Drivers' Championship, whilst both Leclerc and Norris were demoted one position each. Verstappen moved to within eight points of third-placed Hamilton. Antonelli moved to 340 points, enabling him to extend his gap towards teammate and nearest rival Russell to 102 points.

With the top five of the Constructors' Championship remaining unchanged, Ferrari, in second, was able to narrow the gap over Mercedes to 134 points with six races to go, whilst Red Bull closed the points disadvantage to reigning champions and third-placed McLaren to seven.

=== Race classification ===
Pos.	No.	Driver	Constructor	Laps	Time/Retired	Grid	Points
1	3	(Netherlands) Max Verstappen	Red Bull Racing-Red Bull Ford	62	1:42:00.785	1	25
2	16	(Monaco) Charles Leclerc	Ferrari	62	+7.335	2	18
3	12	(Italy) Kimi Antonelli	Mercedes	62	+24.573	4	15
4	1	(United Kingdom) Lando Norris	McLaren-Mercedes	62	+40.506	5	12
5	81	(Australia) Oscar Piastri	McLaren-Mercedes	62	+49.644	6	10
6	44	(United Kingdom) Lewis Hamilton	Ferrari	62	+53.188	3	8
7	30	(New Zealand) Liam Lawson	Racing Bulls-Red Bull Ford	62	+1:21.666	8	6
8	27	(Germany) Nico Hülkenberg	Audi	62	+1:23.386	10	4
9	63	(United Kingdom) George Russell	Mercedes	62	+1:24.677	19	2
10	6	(France) Isack Hadjar	Red Bull Racing-Red Bull Ford	62	+1:30.862	PL	1
11	10	(France) Pierre Gasly	Alpine-Mercedes	61	+1 lap	7	
12	87	(United Kingdom) Oliver Bearman	Haas-Ferrari	61	+1 lap	11	
13	31	(France) Esteban Ocon	Haas-Ferrari	61	+1 lap	12	
14	55	(Spain) Carlos Sainz Jr.	Atlassian Williams-Mercedes	61	+1 lap	13	
15	41	(United Kingdom) Arvid Lindblad	Racing Bulls-Red Bull Ford	61	+1 lap	9	
16	14	(Spain) Fernando Alonso	Aston Martin Aramco-Honda	61	+1 lap	PL	
17	11	(Mexico) Sergio Pérez	Cadillac-Ferrari	60	+2 laps	17	
18^{a}	23	(Thailand) Alexander Albon	Atlassian Williams-Mercedes	59	Overheating	16	
19	77	(Finland) Valtteri Bottas	Cadillac-Ferrari	59	+3 laps	18	
Ret	18	(Canada) Lance Stroll	Aston Martin Aramco-Honda	36	Clutch	PL	
Ret	43	(Argentina) Franco Colapinto	Alpine-Mercedes	29	Transmission	15	
Ret	5	(Brazil) Gabriel Bortoleto	Audi	7	Gearbox	14	

Notes

- ^a – Alexander Albon was classified as he completed more than 90% of the race distance.

== Championship standings after the race ==
Drivers' Championship standings

	Pos.	Driver	Points
	1	(Italy) **Kimi Antonelli***	340
	2	(United Kingdom) **George Russell***	238
	3	(United Kingdom) **Lewis Hamilton***	229
2	4	(Netherlands) **Max Verstappen***	221
1	5	(Monaco) **Charles Leclerc***	215

Constructors' Championship standings

Pos.	Constructor	Points
1	(Germany) **Mercedes***	578
2	(Italy) **Ferrari***	444
3	(United Kingdom) **McLaren-Mercedes***	339
4	(Austria) **Red Bull Racing-Red Bull Ford***	332
5	(Italy) Racing Bulls-Red Bull Ford	100

- Note: Only the top five positions are included for both sets of standings.
- Competitors marked in bold and with an asterisk still have a theoretical chance of becoming World Champion.

Previous race: 2026 Bahrain Grand Prix	FIA Formula One World Championship; 2026 season	Next race: 2026 United States Grand Prix
Previous race: 2025 Singapore Grand Prix	Singapore Grand Prix	Next race: 2027 Singapore Grand Prix
