= 2026 Belgian Grand Prix =

Formula One motor race

Race 10 of 23 (Note: At the time of the event Formula One planned to hold twenty-two Grands Prix.) in the 2026 Formula One World Championship
← Previous race	Next race →
- Layout of the Circuit de Spa-Francorchamps

Race details
- Date: 19 July 2026
- Official name: Formula 1 Moët & Chandon Belgian Grand Prix 2026
- Location: Circuit de Spa-Francorchamps; Stavelot, Belgium
- Course: Permanent racing facility
- Course length: 7.004 km (4.352 miles)
- Distance: 44 laps, 308.054 km (191.415 miles)
- Weather: Partly cloudy. Max. ambient temp. 19.9°C, max. track temp. 34.4°C.
- Attendance: 400,000

Pole position
Driver	(Italy) Kimi Antonelli	Mercedes
- Time: 1:44.361

Fastest lap
Driver	(United Kingdom) Lando Norris	McLaren-Mercedes
- Time: 1:48.890 on lap 44

Podium
First	(Italy) Kimi Antonelli	Mercedes
Second	(Monaco) Charles Leclerc	Ferrari
Third	(Netherlands) Max Verstappen	Red Bull Racing-Red Bull Ford

The 2026 Belgian Grand Prix (officially known as the Formula 1 Moët & Chandon Belgian Grand Prix 2026) was a Formula One motor race that took place on 19 July 2026 at the Circuit de Spa-Francorchamps in Stavelot, Belgium. It was the tenth round of the 2026 Formula One World Championship.

Kimi Antonelli (Mercedes) converted pole position into his sixth victory of both the season and his Formula One career. Antonelli briefly lost the lead to Max Verstappen (Red Bull) on the opening lap and later to Charles Leclerc (Ferrari) after the latter benefited from a virtual safety car-assisted pit stop. He recovered to pass Leclerc on lap 34 and won by just under two seconds, with Leclerc finishing second and Verstappen completing the podium. Antonelli's championship rival and teammate George Russell retired following an opening-lap collision with Lewis Hamilton, enabling Antonelli to extend his championship lead to 45 points over Hamilton and 50 over Russell.

== Background ==
The event was held at the Circuit de Spa-Francorchamps in Stavelot for the 59th time in the circuit's history, across the weekend of 17–19 July. The Grand Prix was the tenth round of the 2026 Formula One World Championship and the 71st running of the Belgian Grand Prix as a round of the Formula One World Championship.

=== Championship standings before the race ===
Going into the weekend, Kimi Antonelli led the Drivers' Championship with 179 points, 25 points ahead of his teammate George Russell in second, and 32 ahead of Lewis Hamilton in third. Mercedes, with 333 points, led the Constructors' Championship from Ferrari and McLaren, who were second and third with 255 and 179 points, respectively.

=== Entrants ===
The drivers and teams were the same as published in the season entry list, with no additional stand-in drivers for the race. During the first practice session Fernando Alonso (Aston Martin) was replaced by Jak Crawford, a driver who had not raced in more than two Grands Prix, as required by the Formula One regulations.

=== Tyre choices ===
Tyre supplier Pirelli brought the C2, C3 and C4 tyre compounds, designated hard, medium and soft, respectively, for teams to use at the event.

== Practice ==
Three free practice sessions were held for the event. The first free practice session was held on 17 July 2026, at 13:30 local time (UTC+2), and was topped by Max Verstappen (Red Bull) ahead of Lewis Hamilton (Ferrari) and his teammate Charles Leclerc. The second free practice session was held on the same day, at 17:00 local time, and was topped by Kimi Antonelli (Mercedes) ahead of Lando Norris (McLaren) and Verstappen. The third free practice session was held on 18 July 2026, at 12:30 local time, and was topped by Antonelli ahead of Norris and Verstappen. The session was most notable for Hamilton crashing at the tail end of the session and breaking his right-rear suspension.

== Qualifying ==
Qualifying was held on 18 July 2026, at 16:00 local time (UTC+2), and determined the starting grid order for the race.

=== Qualifying report ===
Qualifying was held in dry conditions. Kimi Antonelli (Mercedes) entered the session as the favourite for pole position after setting the fastest time in both the second and third practice sessions, while Mercedes had taken pole at each of the opening nine rounds of the season. Ferrari had repaired Lewis Hamilton's car following his crash at Les Fagnes near the end of final practice, with the suspension, floor and rear assembly having sustained damage. Lando Norris, Isack Hadjar, Lance Stroll and Fernando Alonso were due to receive grid penalties for exceeding their permitted allocations of power unit components.

The opening part of qualfying (Q1), began slowly, with Stroll and the Cadillac drivers Valtteri Bottas and Sergio Pérez initially the only cars on the circuit. Pérez set the first representative time before the remainder of the field emerged on the soft compound tyres. Max Verstappen (Red Bull) became the first frontrunner to lead the session, with Arvid Lindblad (Racing Bulls) initially his closest challenger. Hadjar then moved behind Verstappen before Norris (McLaren) set the fastest time of Q1. Norris, Verstappen and Hadjar remained in the pits during the final runs. Franco Colapinto (Alpine) escaped the elimination zone by improving to thirteenth, while teammate Pierre Gasly also improved and set the fastest final sector of the session. Their laps dropped Alexander Albon (Williams) to seventeenth behind Oliver Bearman (Haas), resulting in Albon's sixth Q1 elimination in ten events. Esteban Ocon was eliminated in eighteenth, ahead of Bottas, Pérez and the two Aston Martin drivers Alonso and Stroll.

Unlike Q1, a queue formed immediately at the start of the second part of qualifying (Q2). Colapinto established the first benchmark before Antonelli moved to the top ahead of Charles Leclerc and teammate George Russell. Lindblad placed sixth after the first runs, ahead of Oscar Piastri and Russell. Antonelli, Norris, Hamilton and Verstappen elected not to complete another timed lap, while Leclerc joined the drivers attempting a second run despite occupying second position. Gabriel Bortoleto (Audi) secured the final position for Q3 (the final part of qualifying) over Liam Lawson, who was eliminated in eleventh. Gasly and Colapinto followed in twelfth and thirteenth, while Nico Hülkenberg qualified fourteenth before being instructed to stop his Audi on the circuit with a hydraulic leak. The recovery of Hülkenberg's car delayed the beginning of Q3. Carlos Sainz Jr. placed fifteenth, ahead of Bearman, who completed the Q2 elimination positions.

In Q3, Hadjar abandoned the pursuit of a representative lap and was instead used by Red Bull to provide Verstappen with a slipstream through the final sector. Verstappen initially moved to the top, before Antonelli went quickest, but soon Norris improved to claim provisional pole position. The session was then red-flagged after Piastri ran through the gravel at Stavelot, leaving debris on the racing line that had to be cleared by the marshals. Hadjar again led his teammate onto the circuit for the final attempts, enabling Verstappen to improve. Antonelli immediately responded by improving in all three sectors, beating Verstappen. Norris ran through the gravel at turn 13 and abandoned his final attempt, leaving him third. Russell improved to fourth, while Leclerc remained fifth after lifting at the final chicane when a yellow flag intended for the pit entry was displayed within his line of sight. Leclerc finished behind Russell and ahead of Hamilton. Piastri qualified seventh ahead of Lindblad and Bortoleto, while Hadjar was classified tenth without setting a lap time.

After qualifying, Norris received a ten-place grid penalty for using a fourth control electronics unit, while Stroll received the same penalty for taking a fourth motor generator unit–kinetic. Hadjar accumulated a 30-place penalty after Red Bull installed a fifth internal combustion engine, turbocharger and exhaust set, while Alonso received a 20-place penalty for taking a fifth energy store, fifth control electronics unit and seventh power unit ancillary component. Norris was consequently demoted from third to thirteenth, promoting Russell, Leclerc, Hamilton, Piastri, Lindblad, Bortoleto, Lawson, Gasly, Colapinto and Hülkenberg by one position. Although Stroll had qualified last, he was placed twentieth on the provisional grid, ahead of Hadjar and Alonso, who were allocated twenty-first and twenty-second respectively after their larger penalties. Antonelli's result was his sixth pole position of the season and extended Mercedes' unbeaten qualifying run to all ten rounds held in 2026. His margin over Verstappen was the largest pole-position advantage of the season, while the result placed Antonelli on the front row alongside Verstappen and Russell directly behind his teammate, with Antonelli holding a 25-point lead over Russell in the Drivers' Championship.

=== Qualifying classification ===
Pos.	No.	Driver	Constructor	Qualifying times			Final grid
Pos.	No.	Driver	Constructor	Q1	Q2	Q3	Final grid
1	12	(Italy) Kimi Antonelli	Mercedes	1:46.304	1:45.142	1:44.361	1
2	3	(Netherlands) Max Verstappen	Red Bull Racing-Red Bull Ford	1:45.930	1:45.589	1:44.678	2
3	1	(United Kingdom) Lando Norris	McLaren-Mercedes	1:45.865	1:45.454	1:44.801	13^{a}
4	63	(United Kingdom) George Russell	Mercedes	1:46.185	1:45.689	1:44.869	3
5	16	(Monaco) Charles Leclerc	Ferrari	1:46.278	1:45.397	1:44.893	4
6	44	(United Kingdom) Lewis Hamilton	Ferrari	1:46.124	1:45.543	1:44.895	5
7	81	(Australia) Oscar Piastri	McLaren-Mercedes	1:46.433	1:45.671	1:45.016	6
8	41	(United Kingdom) Arvid Lindblad	Racing Bulls-Red Bull Ford	1:46.191	1:45.629	1:45.143	7
9	5	(Brazil) Gabriel Bortoleto	Audi	1:46.609	1:46.082	1:45.628	8
10	6	(France) Isack Hadjar	Red Bull Racing-Red Bull Ford	1:46.062	1:45.823	No time	21^{b}
11	30	(New Zealand) Liam Lawson	Racing Bulls-Red Bull Ford	1:46.501	1:46.120	N/A	9
12	10	(France) Pierre Gasly	Alpine-Mercedes	1:46.679	1:46.331	N/A	10
13	43	(Argentina) Franco Colapinto	Alpine-Mercedes	1:46.795	1:46.392	N/A	11
14	27	(Germany) Nico Hülkenberg	Audi	1:46.893	1:46.671	N/A	12
15	55	(Spain) Carlos Sainz Jr.	Atlassian Williams-Mercedes	1:47.080	1:46.777	N/A	19^{c}
16	87	(United Kingdom) Oliver Bearman	Haas-Ferrari	1:47.113	1:46.779	N/A	14
17	23	(Thailand) Alexander Albon	Atlassian Williams-Mercedes	1:47.120	N/A	N/A	15
18	31	(France) Esteban Ocon	Haas-Ferrari	1:47.801	N/A	N/A	16
19	77	(Finland) Valtteri Bottas	Cadillac-Ferrari	1:47.823	N/A	N/A	17
20	11	(Mexico) Sergio Pérez	Cadillac-Ferrari	1:47.971	N/A	N/A	18
21	14	(Spain) Fernando Alonso	Aston Martin Aramco-Honda	1:50.002	N/A	N/A	22^{d}
22	18	(Canada) Lance Stroll	Aston Martin Aramco-Honda	1:50.177	N/A	N/A	20^{e}
107% time: 1:53.275

Notes

- ^a – Lando Norris received a ten-place grid penalty for exceeding his quota of power unit elements.
- ^b – Isack Hadjar received a 30-place grid penalty for exceeding his quota of power unit elements.
- ^c – Carlos Sainz Jr. received a ten-place grid penalty for exceeding his quota of power unit elements.
- ^d – Fernando Alonso received a 20-place grid penalty for exceeding his quota of power unit elements.
- ^e – Lance Stroll received a ten-place grid penalty for exceeding his quota of power unit elements.

== Race ==
The race was held on 19 July 2026, at 15:00 local time (UTC+2), and was run for 44 laps.

=== Race report ===
The 44-lap race began in cool, overcast but dry conditions, despite reports during the formation lap that rain was approaching the circuit. Pirelli had expected thermal degradation to make a two-stop strategy the preferred option. The majority of the field started on the medium-compound tyres, while Lando Norris, Sergio Pérez, Lance Stroll, Isack Hadjar and Fernando Alonso selected the hard compound. Valtteri Bottas and Carlos Sainz Jr. were the only drivers to begin on soft tyres. Kimi Antonelli (Mercedes) started from pole position alongside Max Verstappen (Red Bull), with Antonelli's teammate George Russell and Charles Leclerc (Ferrari) on the second row.

Antonelli retained the lead through La Source, but Verstappen obtained a better run on the descent towards Eau Rouge and briefly moved ahead. Antonelli used Verstappen's slipstream and the straight-line speed of his Mercedes to regain first place along the Kemmel Straight before Les Combes, while Leclerc also passed Verstappen to take second. Russell suffered a loss of electrical deployment after La Source and was passed by both Ferrari drivers. He attempted to recover a position from Lewis Hamilton around the outside at the first part of Les Combes, but Hamilton understeered into the Mercedes, with his left-front wheel making contact with Russell's right-rear. Russell spun into the gravel and became stranded, bringing out the safety car at the beginning of lap two. Elsewhere on the opening lap, Esteban Ocon (Haas) made contact with Sainz and subsequently teammate Oliver Bearman in separate incidents, sustaining a front-left puncture and dropping to the rear of the field.

The stewards determined that Russell had established sufficient overlap and had remained within the available racing room. Although Hamilton had attempted to avoid the contact, the stewards considered him wholly responsible because he had been unable to maintain sufficient separation. His loss of front-end grip, his attempt to take avoiding action and the fact that the collision occurred during the compressed conditions of the opening lap were treated as mitigating factors. Hamilton consequently received a five-second time penalty instead of the standard ten-second sanction and was not given any penalty points.

Several drivers stopped during the safety car period, including Hadjar, Bearman and both Cadillac drivers. Red Bull used the interruption to cycle Hadjar, who had started twenty-first on hard tyres, onto mediums and then back onto another set of hards. Racing resumed at the beginning of lap five, with Antonelli accelerating early and retaining the lead ahead of Leclerc and Verstappen. Hamilton passed Oscar Piastri (McLaren) at La Source, with Piastri immediately reclaiming fourth place through Eau Rouge and Raidillon. Verstappen used the tow along the Kemmel Straight to pass Leclerc for second at Les Combes on lap six. Behind the leading five, the Racing Bulls drivers Liam Lawson and Arvid Lindblad had advanced to sixth and seventh respectively, with Franco Colapinto (Alpine) involved in their midfield battle.

Piastri challenged Leclerc around the outside at Les Combes on lap eight, but the two made side-to-side contact as Leclerc moved towards the racing line. The collision dislodged a piece of bodywork and damaged Piastri's McLaren. The stewards took no further action, ruling that Piastri's front axle had not drawn ahead of Leclerc's and that there had been no realistic possibility of completing the overtake from the outside. They also determined that Leclerc had followed the normal racing line rather than deliberately forcing Piastri off the circuit. Hamilton passed the damaged McLaren shortly afterwards and moved into fourth. Norris used the durability of his hard tyres to advance from thirteenth to seventh by lap 11 and then passed Lindblad for sixth. Hamilton repeatedly informed Ferrari that he had more pace than Leclerc, but the team did not exchange their positions. Pérez retired on lap 14 after reporting a suspension failure, while Sainz made an early stop for a new front wing after damage sustained during his opening-lap contact with Ocon.

Antonelli managed his tyres during the first stint before increasing his pace as the first pit stop window approached. He extended his advantage over Verstappen from approximately two seconds to more than three seconds before Verstappen became the first of the leaders to stop, changing from mediums to hards. A brief virtual safety car period was called shortly afterwards while debris was removed from the circuit, it ended before Antonelli could benefit. Mercedes stopped him on the following lap to cover Verstappen's strategy, with Antonelli rejoining in fifth place but retaining the net lead over Verstappen.

A second virtual safety car period was called around lap 20 while marshals were on the circuit. Ferrari took advantage by pitting both its drivers. Leclerc's reduced-loss pitstop enabled him to emerge ahead of Antonelli, while Hamilton served his five-second penalty before leaving the pit box. Hamilton was shown the signal to depart while a mechanic was still positioned beside the right-front corner of the car, and his front-right wheel made low-speed contact with the mechanic, knocking him down. The mechanic was uninjured. The premature release prevented Ferrari from completing the front-wing adjustment Hamilton had requested. The incident was referred for a post-race investigation.

Norris, who had not yet stopped, led at the halfway point from Leclerc, Antonelli, Verstappen, Piastri and Hamilton. Leclerc passed Norris along the Kemmel Straight on lap 23, while Antonelli initially lost time behind the McLaren before overtaking it three laps later. Verstappen, who complained that his hard tyres lacked grip, passed Norris for third on lap 29. Piastri then closed on his teammate, prompting McLaren to instruct the drivers not to lose time battling one another. Norris remained on his original hard tyres until lap 31 because the second virtual safety car had occurred too early for a set of mediums to comfortably reach the finish. His eventual change to the medium compound was delayed by a problem with the left-rear wheel, dropping him to eighth before he passed Gabriel Bortoleto (Audi) for seventh.

Leclerc initially held an advantage of approximately three seconds over Antonelli, but began to struggle with front-axle grip on the hard tyres and reported harsh downshifts from his Ferrari. Antonelli steadily reduced the gap and caught up to Leclerc on lap 33, with traffic involving Bottas further reducing the Leclerc's advantage. On lap 34, Antonelli used the Mercedes' straight-line speed and overtake deployment to pass Leclerc along the Kemmel Straight to reclaim the lead. Leclerc remained within approximately one second for several laps and continued to apply pressure, but was unable to attempt a pass. Mercedes warned Antonelli that he had already exceeded track limits twice, requiring him to avoid another infringement during the closing laps. Antonelli maintained his advantage and won by securing his sixth victory of the season.

Verstappen finished a distant third after being unable to match the leading pair on the hard compound. Hamilton recovered from his penalty and the incomplete front-wing adjustment to pass Piastri during the closing laps and finish fourth, with Piastri fifth. Hadjar completed his recovery from twenty-first on the grid in sixth following his three-stop strategy. Norris suffered a slow pit stop and tried to get close to Hadjar but was unable to pass before the finish; he set the race's fastest lap on the final lap.

Bortoleto took eighth, ahead of Lindblad in ninth. The final point was decided during a three-way fight involving Colapinto, teammate Pierre Gasly and Lawson. When Lawson attempted to pass Gasly along the Kemmel Straight, Colapinto overtook both drivers and retained tenth place to the finish. Gasly finished eleventh ahead of Lawson and Nico Hülkenberg, with Bearman, Alexander Albon, Sainz, Ocon, Bottas and Alonso completing the classified finishers. Stroll retired after 25 laps with a suspected gearbox problem, joining Pérez and Russell as the race's three retirements.

==== Post-race and championship impact ====
Antonelli's victory was the sixth of both his Formula One career and the season. He increased his championship total to 204 points and reversed the reduction in his lead that had occurred during the preceding three rounds. Having entered the event 25 points ahead of Russell, Antonelli left Belgium 45 points ahead of Hamilton, who moved into second place on 159 points. Russell dropped to third on 154 points, 50 behind Antonelli, while Leclerc remained fourth with 126 and Norris fifth with 103. Despite Russell's retirement, Mercedes retained the lead of the Constructors' Championship with 358 points, 73 ahead of Ferrari on 285. McLaren remained third with 195 points and Red Bull fourth with 151. Colapinto's point and Lindblad's ninth-place finish left Alpine and Racing Bulls level on 61 points in the contest for fifth place.

Russell stated after the race that the electrical system had failed to recharge after La Source, leaving his battery approximately 35 per cent below its expected level and without usable deployment by the top of Eau Rouge. The associated loss of boost left him vulnerable to Leclerc and Hamilton along the Kemmel Straight. Shortly after the incident, Russell, on an unbroadcast piece of team radio, angrily admonished his battery's faulty charging state, which left him with no usable battery deployment down the straight. Although the stewards penalised Hamilton, Russell regarded their contact as a racing incident and said that he did not blame Hamilton, instead focusing his criticism on the technical problem that had placed him in the battle. The failure was separate from the straight-line performance issue Mercedes had investigated earlier in the weekend.

=== Race classification ===
Pos.	No.	Driver	Constructor	Laps	Time/Retired	Grid	Points
1	12	(Italy) Kimi Antonelli	Mercedes	44	1:24:42.479	1	25
2	16	(Monaco) Charles Leclerc	Ferrari	44	+1.952	4	18
3	3	(Netherlands) Max Verstappen	Red Bull Racing-Red Bull Ford	44	+11.586	2	15
4	44	(United Kingdom) Lewis Hamilton	Ferrari	44	+17.245	5	12
5	81	(Australia) Oscar Piastri	McLaren-Mercedes	44	+18.988	6	10
6	6	(France) Isack Hadjar	Red Bull Racing-Red Bull Ford	44	+23.307	21	8
7	1	(United Kingdom) Lando Norris	McLaren-Mercedes	44	+24.014	13	6
8	5	(Brazil) Gabriel Bortoleto	Audi	44	+49.140	8	4
9	41	(United Kingdom) Arvid Lindblad	Racing Bulls-Red Bull Ford	44	+50.406	7	2
10	43	(Argentina) Franco Colapinto	Alpine-Mercedes	44	+1:16.037	11	1
11	10	(France) Pierre Gasly	Alpine-Mercedes	44	+1:16.991	10	
12	30	(New Zealand) Liam Lawson	Racing Bulls-Red Bull Ford	44	+1:17.523	9	
13	27	(Germany) Nico Hülkenberg	Audi	44	+1:18.348	12	
14	87	(United Kingdom) Oliver Bearman	Haas-Ferrari	44	+1:34.465	14	
15	23	(Thailand) Alexander Albon	Atlassian Williams-Mercedes	44	+1:44.684	15	
16	55	(Spain) Carlos Sainz Jr.	Atlassian Williams-Mercedes	44	+1:45.856	19	
17	31	(France) Esteban Ocon	Haas-Ferrari	44	+1:50.925	16	
18	77	(Finland) Valtteri Bottas	Cadillac-Ferrari	43	+1 lap	17	
19	14	(Spain) Fernando Alonso	Aston Martin Aramco-Honda	42	+2 laps	22	
Ret	18	(Canada) Lance Stroll	Aston Martin Aramco-Honda	25	Gearbox	20	
Ret	11	(Mexico) Sergio Pérez	Cadillac-Ferrari	13	Suspension	18	
Ret	63	(United Kingdom) George Russell	Mercedes	0	Collision	3	

== Championship standings after the race ==
Drivers' Championship standings

	Pos.	Driver	Points
	1	(Italy) Kimi Antonelli	204
1	2	(United Kingdom) Lewis Hamilton	159
1	3	(United Kingdom) George Russell	154
	4	(Monaco) Charles Leclerc	126
	5	(United Kingdom) Lando Norris	103

Constructors' Championship standings

Pos.	Constructor	Points
1	(Germany) Mercedes	358
2	(Italy) Ferrari	285
3	(United Kingdom) McLaren-Mercedes	197
4	(Austria) Red Bull Racing-Red Bull Ford	154
5	(Italy) Racing Bulls-Red Bull Ford	65

- Note: Only the top five positions are included for both sets of standings.

== See also ==
- 2026 Spa-Francorchamps Formula 2 round
- 2026 Spa-Francorchamps Formula 3 round

== Notes ==
Previous race: 2026 British Grand Prix	FIA Formula One World Championship; 2026 season	Next race: 2026 Hungarian Grand Prix
Previous race: 2025 Belgian Grand Prix	Belgian Grand Prix	Next race: 2027 Belgian Grand Prix
