= 2026 Japanese Grand Prix =

Third round of the 2026 F1 season

Race 3 of 23 (Note: At the time of the event Formula One planned to hold twenty-two Grands Prix.) in the 2026 Formula One World Championship
| ← Previous race | Next race → |
- Layout of the Suzuka International Racing Course

Race details
- Date: 29 March 2026
- Official name: Formula 1 Aramco Japanese Grand Prix 2026
- Location: Suzuka International Racing Course; Suzuka, Mie Prefecture, Japan
- Course: Permanent racing facility
- Course length: 5.807 km (3.608 miles)
- Distance: 53 laps, 307.471 km (191.054 miles)
- Weather: Cloudy. Max. ambient temp. 19.8°C, max. track temp. 36.8°C.
- Attendance: 315,000

Pole position
| Driver | (Italy) Kimi Antonelli | Mercedes |
- Time: 1:28.778

Fastest lap
| Driver | (Italy) Kimi Antonelli | Mercedes |
- Time: 1:32.432 on lap 49

Podium
| First | (Italy) Kimi Antonelli | Mercedes |
| Second | (Australia) Oscar Piastri | McLaren-Mercedes |
| Third | (Monaco) Charles Leclerc | Ferrari |

The 2026 Japanese Grand Prix (officially known as the Formula One Aramco Japanese Grand Prix 2026) was a Formula One motor race that was held on 29 March 2026 at the Suzuka International Racing Course in Suzuka, Japan. It was the third round of the 2026 Formula One World Championship. Kimi Antonelli converted the pole position to a win for Mercedes, ahead of Oscar Piastri (McLaren) and Charles Leclerc (Ferrari). Antonelli took the lead of the Drivers' Championship for the first time in his career, becoming the youngest World Drivers' Championship leader at 19 years and 216 days. Doing this, he also became Italy's first Drivers' Championship leader since Giancarlo Fisichella led the 2005 championship.

== Background ==
The event was held at the Suzuka International Racing Course in Suzuka for the 36th time in the circuit's history, across the weekend of 27–29 March. The Grand Prix was the third round of the 2026 Formula One World Championship and the 40th running of the Japanese Grand Prix as a round of the Formula One World Championship.

=== Championship standings before the race ===
Going into the event, George Russell (Mercedes) led the Drivers' Championship with 51 points, 4 points ahead of his teammate Kimi Antonelli in second, and 17 points of Charles Leclerc (Ferrari) in third. Mercedes entered this round as the leaders of the Constructors' Championship with 98 points, 31 points ahead of Ferrari and 80 points ahead of McLaren, who were second and third, respectively.

=== Entrants ===
The drivers and teams were the same as published in the season entry list, with no additional stand-in drivers for the race. During the first practice session Fernando Alonso (Aston Martin) was replaced by Jak Crawford, a driver who had not raced in more than two Grands Prix, as required by the Formula One regulations.

=== Tyre choices ===
Tyre supplier Pirelli brought the C1, C2, and C3 tyre compounds (the three hardest in their range) designated hard, medium, and soft, respectively, for teams to use at the event.

== Practice ==
Three free practice sessions were held for the event. The first free practice session was held on 27 March 2026, at 11:30 local time (UTC+9), and was topped by George Russell (Mercedes) ahead of his teammate Kimi Antonelli and Lando Norris (McLaren). The second free practice session was held on the same day, at 15:00 local time, and was topped by Oscar Piastri (McLaren) ahead of Antonelli and Russell. The third free practice session was held on 28 March 2026, at 11:30 local time, and was topped by Antonelli ahead of Russell and Charles Leclerc (Ferrari).

== Qualifying ==
Qualifying was held on 28 March 2026, at 15:00 local time (UTC+9), and determined the starting grid order for the race.

=== Qualifying classification ===
| Pos. | No. | Driver | Constructor | Qualifying times | | | Final grid |
| Pos. | No. | Driver | Constructor | Q1 | Q2 | Q3 | Final grid |
|---|---|---|---|---|---|---|---|
| 1 | 12 | (Italy) Kimi Antonelli | Mercedes | 1:30.035 | 1:29.048 | 1:28.778 | 1 |
| 2 | 63 | (United Kingdom) George Russell | Mercedes | 1:29.967 | 1:29.686 | 1:29.076 | 2 |
| 3 | 81 | (Australia) Oscar Piastri | McLaren-Mercedes | 1:30.200 | 1:29.451 | 1:29.132 | 3 |
| 4 | 16 | (Monaco) Charles Leclerc | Ferrari | 1:29.915 | 1:29.303 | 1:29.405 | 4 |
| 5 | 1 | (United Kingdom) Lando Norris | McLaren-Mercedes | 1:30.401 | 1:29.795 | 1:29.409 | 5 |
| 6 | 44 | (United Kingdom) Lewis Hamilton | Ferrari | 1:30.309 | 1:29.589 | 1:29.567 | 6 |
| 7 | 10 | (France) Pierre Gasly | Alpine-Mercedes | 1:30.584 | 1:29.874 | 1:29.691 | 7 |
| 8 | 6 | (France) Isack Hadjar | Red Bull Racing-Red Bull Ford | 1:30.662 | 1:30.104 | 1:29.978 | 8 |
| 9 | 5 | (Brazil) Gabriel Bortoleto | Audi | 1:30.359 | 1:29.990 | 1:30.274 | 9 |
| 10 | 41 | (United Kingdom) Arvid Lindblad | Racing Bulls-Red Bull Ford | 1:30.781 | 1:30.109 | 1:30.319 | 10 |
| 11 | 3 | (Netherlands) Max Verstappen | Red Bull Racing-Red Bull Ford | 1:30.519 | 1:30.262 | N/A | 11 |
| 12 | 31 | (France) Esteban Ocon | Haas-Ferrari | 1:30.915 | 1:30.309 | N/A | 12 |
| 13 | 27 | (Germany) Nico Hülkenberg | Audi | 1:30.358 | 1:30.387 | N/A | 13 |
| 14 | 30 | (New Zealand) Liam Lawson | Racing Bulls-Red Bull Ford | 1:30.657 | 1:30.495 | N/A | 14 |
| 15 | 43 | (Argentina) Franco Colapinto | Alpine-Mercedes | 1:30.931 | 1:30.627 | N/A | 15 |
| 16 | 55 | (Spain) Carlos Sainz Jr. | Atlassian Williams-Mercedes | 1:30.927 | 1:31.033 | N/A | 16 |
| 17 | 23 | (Thailand) Alexander Albon | Atlassian Williams-Mercedes | 1:31.088 | N/A | N/A | 17 |
| 18 | 87 | (United Kingdom) Oliver Bearman | Haas-Ferrari | 1:31.090 | N/A | N/A | 18 |
| 19 | 11 | (Mexico) Sergio Pérez | Cadillac-Ferrari | 1:32.206 | N/A | N/A | 19 |
| 20 | 77 | (Finland) Valtteri Bottas | Cadillac-Ferrari | 1:32.330 | N/A | N/A | 20 |
| 21 | 14 | (Spain) Fernando Alonso | Aston Martin Aramco-Honda | 1:32.646 | N/A | N/A | 21 |
| 22 | 18 | (Canada) Lance Stroll | Aston Martin Aramco-Honda | 1:32.920 | N/A | N/A | 22 |
107% time: 1:36.209

== Race ==
The race was held on 29 March 2026, and was scheduled to start at 14:00 local time (UTC+9) before being delayed to 14:10 following an accident in the Porsche Carrera Cup Japan support series that resulted in repairs to the barriers at turn 12. The race was run for 53 laps.

=== Race report ===
At the race start, McLaren's Oscar Piastri and Ferrari's Charles Leclerc had good starts putting themselves into first and second, respectively. The Mercedes drivers both had slow starts with George Russell failing to fourth and polesitter Kimi Antonelli falling to sixth. Russell overtook Norris for third on the second lap and then Leclerc for second on the third, but was unable to catch Piastri in the lead. Antonelli eventually recovered to fourth by lap 10. Red Bull Racing's Max Verstappen, who started eleventh, made a good start and was dueling with Alpine's Pierre Gasly for seventh.

Norris was the first of the frontrunners to pit on lap 16, with Leclerc pitting one lap later. To avoid getting undercut by Leclerc and wanting to hold track position to Russell, Piastri pitted on lap 18. This left Russell and Antonelli in the lead. Russell eventually pitted on lap 20, relinquishing the lead to his teammate. Later that lap, Oliver Bearman crashed his Haas at Spoon curve. Bearman was racing behind the Alpine of Franco Colapinto; on the run to Spoon curve, Colapinto was electing to cut the electrical energy earlier than Bearman, to utilise the energy further down the straight. On lap 20, Bearman was using more electrical energy resulting in a speed differential of an estimated 45 km/h (28 mph). This resulted in Bearman having to take avoiding action on the grass where he lost control of the car.

The safety car was deployed, allowing Antonelli to retain his lead as he pitted. Ferrari's Lewis Hamilton, Gasly, and Verstappen also benefitted as they had not pitted yet. Hamilton lost time in the pit lane due to being held for an incoming Verstappen, dropping him to fourth behind Antonelli, Piastri, and Russell. On the restart, Antonelli had a good getaway from Piastri while Russell was overtaken by Hamilton and later Leclerc. On lap 41, Leclerc, who had the stronger pace between the two Ferraris, overtook his teammate. Russell overtook Hamilton the next lap. In the final few laps, Leclerc managed to hold off Russell for third, Gasly held off Verstappen for seventh, and Norris overtook Hamilton for fifth. Antonelli won from Piastri for his second career win. In doing so, he became the youngest World Drivers' Championship leader. Piastri, in his first Grand Prix start of the season, and Leclerc rounded out the podium. Russell, Norris, Hamilton, Gasly, Verstappen, Liam Lawson and Esteban Ocon rounded out the remaining points positions.

=== Post-race ===
The regulation changes surrounding the increased usage of the battery and electric power deployment modes came under scrutiny from drivers following Bearman's crash. The FIA held a review with power unit developers on 9 April regarding potential refinements to the regulations. One of the solutions was to reduce the deployment rate of electrical energy while increasing the amount that can be harvested while undergoing "super clipping", a phenomenon that occurs when the battery is being charged on full throttle against the engine. Three further meetings were held on 15, 16 and 20 April, where further options would be evaluated and agreed on by team representatives, the FIA, Formula One Management, and power unit manufacturers, with the intention that these changes would be introduced for the following Miami Grand Prix.

=== Race classification ===
| Pos. | No. | Driver | Constructor | Laps | Time/Retired | Grid | Points |
|---|---|---|---|---|---|---|---|
| 1 | 12 | (Italy) Kimi Antonelli | Mercedes | 53 | 1:28:03.403 | 1 | 25 |
| 2 | 81 | (Australia) Oscar Piastri | McLaren-Mercedes | 53 | +13.722 | 3 | 18 |
| 3 | 16 | (Monaco) Charles Leclerc | Ferrari | 53 | +15.270 | 4 | 15 |
| 4 | 63 | (United Kingdom) George Russell | Mercedes | 53 | +15.754 | 2 | 12 |
| 5 | 1 | (United Kingdom) Lando Norris | McLaren-Mercedes | 53 | +23.479 | 5 | 10 |
| 6 | 44 | (United Kingdom) Lewis Hamilton | Ferrari | 53 | +25.037 | 6 | 8 |
| 7 | 10 | (France) Pierre Gasly | Alpine-Mercedes | 53 | +32.340 | 7 | 6 |
| 8 | 3 | (Netherlands) Max Verstappen | Red Bull Racing-Red Bull Ford | 53 | +32.677 | 11 | 4 |
| 9 | 30 | (New Zealand) Liam Lawson | Racing Bulls-Red Bull Ford | 53 | +50.180 | 14 | 2 |
| 10 | 31 | (France) Esteban Ocon | Haas-Ferrari | 53 | +51.216 | 12 | 1 |
| 11 | 27 | (Germany) Nico Hülkenberg | Audi | 53 | +52.280 | 13 | |
| 12 | 6 | (France) Isack Hadjar | Red Bull Racing-Red Bull Ford | 53 | +56.154 | 8 | |
| 13 | 5 | (Brazil) Gabriel Bortoleto | Audi | 53 | +59.078 | 9 | |
| 14 | 41 | (United Kingdom) Arvid Lindblad | Racing Bulls-Red Bull Ford | 53 | +59.848 | 10 | |
| 15 | 55 | (Spain) Carlos Sainz Jr. | Atlassian Williams-Mercedes | 53 | +1:05.008 | 16 | |
| 16 | 43 | (Argentina) Franco Colapinto | Alpine-Mercedes | 53 | +1:05.773 | 15 | |
| 17 | 11 | (Mexico) Sergio Pérez | Cadillac-Ferrari | 53 | +1:32.453 | 19 | |
| 18 | 14 | (Spain) Fernando Alonso | Aston Martin Aramco-Honda | 52 | +1 lap | 21 | |
| 19 | 77 | (Finland) Valtteri Bottas | Cadillac-Ferrari | 52 | +1 lap | 20 | |
| 20 | 23 | (Thailand) Alexander Albon | Atlassian Williams-Mercedes | 51 | +2 laps | 17 | |
| Ret | 18 | (Canada) Lance Stroll | Aston Martin Aramco-Honda | 30 | Water pressure | 22 | |
| Ret | 87 | (United Kingdom) Oliver Bearman | Haas-Ferrari | 20 | Accident | 18 | |

== Championship standings after the race ==
Drivers' Championship standings

| | Pos. | Driver | Points |
|---|---|---|---|
| 1 | 1 | (Italy) Kimi Antonelli | 72 |
| 1 | 2 | (United Kingdom) George Russell | 63 |
| | 3 | (Monaco) Charles Leclerc | 49 |
| | 4 | (United Kingdom) Lewis Hamilton | 41 |
| 1 | 5 | (United Kingdom) Lando Norris | 25 |

Constructors' Championship standings

| | Pos. | Constructor | Points |
|---|---|---|---|
| | 1 | (Germany) Mercedes | 135 |
| | 2 | (Italy) Ferrari | 90 |
| | 3 | (United Kingdom) McLaren-Mercedes | 46 |
| | 4 | (United States) Haas-Ferrari | 18 |
| 2 | 5 | (France) Alpine-Mercedes | 16 |

- Note: Only the top five positions are included for both sets of standings.

== Notes ==
| Previous race: 2026 Chinese Grand Prix | FIA Formula One World Championship; 2026 season | Next race: 2026 Miami Grand Prix |
| Previous race: 2025 Japanese Grand Prix | Japanese Grand Prix | Next race: 2027 Japanese Grand Prix |
