= 2026 Hungarian Grand Prix =

Formula One motor race

Race 11 of 23 in the 2026 Formula One World Championship
← Previous race	Next race →
- Layout of the Hungaroring

Race details
- Date: 26 July 2026
- Official name: Formula 1 AWS Hungarian Grand Prix 2026
- Location: Hungaroring; Mogyoród, Hungary
- Course: Permanent racing facility
- Course length: 4.381 km (2.722 miles)
- Distance: 70 laps, 306.630 km (190.531 miles)
- Weather: Partly cloudy. Max. ambient temp. 31.9°C, max. track temp. 53.1°C.
- Attendance: 310,000

Pole position
Driver	(United Kingdom) Lando Norris	McLaren-Mercedes
- Time: 1:17.207

Fastest lap
Driver	(Monaco) Charles Leclerc	Ferrari
- Time: 1:22.000 on lap 58

Podium
First	(United Kingdom) Lando Norris	McLaren-Mercedes
Second	(Netherlands) Max Verstappen	Red Bull Racing-Red Bull Ford
Third	(Italy) Kimi Antonelli	Mercedes

The 2026 Hungarian Grand Prix (officially known as the Formula 1 AWS Hungarian Grand Prix 2026) was a Formula One motor race held on 26 July 2026 at the Hungaroring in Mogyoród, Hungary. It was the eleventh round of the 2026 Formula One World Championship.

Lando Norris secured pole position for McLaren, ending Mercedes's run of ten consecutive pole positions since the start of the season. Lewis Hamilton (Ferrari) and Kimi Antonelli (Mercedes), who had qualified second and fourth respectively, each received a three-place grid penalty. As a result, Charles Leclerc (Ferrari) was promoted to the front row alongside Norris, while Piastri and Max Verstappen (Red Bull) moved up to the second row.

Norris converted pole position into a twelfth career victory, his and McLaren's first victory of the season. The victory also allowed McLaren to extend their record for most Hungarian Grand Prix wins (14) and marked the team's third consecutive victory at the circuit. Norris's teammate Piastri led for the early stages of the race but lost time during the second pit stop sequence when he made contact with Carlos Sainz Jr. (Williams) while lapping him, before later retiring due to a gearbox failure.

Verstappen and Antonelli completed the podium. Antonelli increased his Drivers' Championship lead to 50 and 59 points over Hamilton and teammate George Russell respectively, while Mercedes retained a 72-point lead over Ferrari in the Constructors' Championship.

== Background ==
The event was held at the Hungaroring in Mogyoród for the 41st time in the circuit's history, across the weekend of 24–26 July. The Grand Prix was the eleventh round of the 2026 Formula One World Championship and the 41st running of the Hungarian Grand Prix as part of the Formula One World Championship.

=== Championship standings before the race ===
Going into the weekend, Kimi Antonelli led the Drivers' Championship with 204 points, 45 points ahead of Lewis Hamilton in second, and 50 ahead of his teammate George Russell in third. Mercedes, with 358 points, led the Constructors' Championship from Ferrari and McLaren, who were second and third with 285 and 195 points, respectively.

=== Entrants ===
The drivers and teams were the same as published in the season entry list, with no additional stand-in drivers for the race.

During the first practice session, five teams fielded alternate drivers who had not raced in more than two Grands Prix, as required by the Formula One regulations:

- Leonardo Fornaroli for McLaren in place of Oscar Piastri.
- Colton Herta for Cadillac in place of Valtteri Bottas.
- Ryo Hirakawa for Haas in place of Oliver Bearman.
- Paul Aron for Alpine in place of Franco Colapinto.
- Frederik Vesti for Mercedes in place of Kimi Antonelli.

=== Tyre choices ===
Tyre supplier Pirelli brought the C3, C4, and C5 tyre compounds—the softest three in its range, designated hard, medium, and soft, respectively—for teams to use at the event.

== Practice ==
Three free practice sessions were held for the event. The first free practice session was held on 24 July 2026, at 13:30 local time (UTC+2), and was topped by Charles Leclerc (Ferrari) ahead of Max Verstappen (Red Bull) and Lewis Hamilton (Ferrari). The second free practice session was held on the same day, at 17:00 local time, and was topped by Hamilton ahead of Leclerc and Lando Norris (McLaren). The third free practice was held on 25 July 2026, at 12:30 local time, and was topped by Norris ahead of Hamilton and Kimi Antonelli (Mercedes).

== Qualifying ==
Qualifying was held on 25 July 2026, at 16:00 local time (UTC+2), and determined the starting grid order for the race.

=== Qualifying report ===
Qualifying was held in hot and dry conditions, with track temperatures approaching 50 °C (122 °F) and the heat making it difficult to preserve the tyres through the Hungaroring's twisting final sector. McLaren had brought a significant upgrade package for the event.

Several drivers from the lower end of the practice order entered the circuit immediately at the start of Q1 (the first of the three segments of qualifying). Valtteri Bottas (Cadillac) was the first to leave the pit lane, followed by the Williams drivers Carlos Sainz Jr. and Alexander Albon. Fernando Alonso set the initial benchmark for Aston Martin. Ferrari were the only team to begin on the medium compound tyres; Hamilton moved into first place, while Leclerc's opening effort was deleted for exceeding track limits at turn 3. Max Verstappen (Red Bull) then moved ahead of Hamilton, with teammate Isack Hadjar initially third, before Antonelli moved into second. Norris subsequently went fastest and remained at the top for the rest of Q1. Gabriel Bortoleto (Audi) and Pierre Gasly (Alpine) recovered after having their first representative laps deleted, while Alonso improved late in the session to claim the final position in the second part of qualifying (Q2) position and give Aston Martin its first Grand Prix Q2 appearance of the season. Oliver Bearman (Haas) missed progression and was eliminated in seventeenth, ahead of Sainz, Albon, Lance Stroll, Bottas and Sergio Pérez. The two Williams drivers qualified eighteenth and nineteenth, respectively, while both Cadillacs were classified on the final row.

Alonso was the first driver on track in Q2, before Verstappen established the early benchmark. Hadjar clipped the gravel and spun onto the grass, causing yellow flags which required George Russell to back off; Leclerc was noted for a possible yellow flag infringement but no further investigation was launched. Once the circuit returned to green flag conditions, Hamilton went fastest. Antonelli complained of having no grip and had a lap time deleted, while Hadjar recovered from his spin to move briefly into first. Norris reclaimed first place during the final runs, ahead of Leclerc and Hamilton. Arvid Lindblad (Racing Bulls) improved to seventh and displaced teammate Liam Lawson from the top ten, while Antonelli recovered to advance in eighth ahead of Russell. Nico Hülkenberg secured the final place in the final part of qualifying (Q3) for Audi, beating Lawson. Lawson was eliminated in eleventh ahead of Gasly and Franco Colapinto, while Bortoleto placed fourteenth after his first lap had been compromised by Hadjar's yellow flags. Esteban Ocon, who suspected that he had damaged his floor at turn 3, qualified fifteenth ahead of Alonso.

All of the leading drivers had retained two new sets of the softest C5 tyre for Q3. Verstappen set the first timed lap, before Oscar Piastri and Norris successively moved ahead. Hamilton then took provisional pole, with Norris second after sliding while exiting the final corner. Leclerc held third after the opening runs, ahead of Antonelli, Piastri, Verstappen, Russell, Hadjar, Lindblad and Hülkenberg. Hamilton, seeking a record tenth pole position at the Hungaroring and his first for a Grand Prix since the 2023, and Leclerc were the first two leading drivers to begin their final attempts. Neither Ferrari driver improved, while Hamilton encountered Piastri at turn 1 after completing his lap. Hamilton was travelling slowly on the racing line and, having received Ferrari's warning too late to see the approaching McLaren in his mirrors, forced Piastri to run wide and abandon his final attempt. Norris improved through the second and third sectors, beating Hamilton. Verstappen spun at turn 14 on his final attempt, bringing out yellow flags as Antonelli completed an improved lap to retain fourth. Russell was also unable to improve and was instructed to stop at turn 1 after vibrations from crossing the turn 4 kerb caused a water leak and loss of pressure, prompting double yellow flags. Piastri remained fifth, ahead of Verstappen and Russell, with Hadjar eighth, Lindblad ninth and Hülkenberg tenth.

=== Post qualifying ===
After qualifying, the stewards determined that Hamilton had unnecessarily impeded Piastri and imposed a three-place grid penalty, demoting him from second to fifth. Their decision noted that Piastri had been forced to take avoiding action and abort his lap, while Hamilton had not been informed of the approaching car until it was already close behind. Antonelli was investigated over two separate incidents. For failing to slow sufficiently under the single yellow flags caused by Verstappen's spin, he received a three-place grid penalty and one penalty point on his FIA Super Licence, taking his total to four over the preceding 12 months. Telemetry showed that, despite lifting off the throttle earlier, his reduction in speed lasted only briefly and he passed the incident slightly faster than on his previous push lap. The standard five-place penalty was reduced because Antonelli had made an attempt to slow and had limited time and distance in which to react. Antonelli received only a warning for the second incident, in which he exceeded the prescribed maximum time between the second and first safety car lines on an in-lap, because no other driver was affected.

The two grid penalties promoted Leclerc to the front row alongside Norris, with Piastri and Verstappen on the second row. Hamilton retained fifth ahead of Russell, while Antonelli was demoted from fourth to seventh. Norris's pole was the seventeenth of his Formula One career and his first since the 2025 Las Vegas Grand Prix. It was also the first Grand Prix pole of 2026 for both Norris and McLaren, and ended Mercedes's run of ten consecutive pole positions at the opening ten rounds.

=== Qualifying classification ===
Pos.	No.	Driver	Constructor	Qualifying times			Final grid
Pos.	No.	Driver	Constructor	Q1	Q2	Q3	Final grid
1	1	(United Kingdom) Lando Norris	McLaren-Mercedes	1:18.277	1:17.456	1:17.207	1
2	44	(United Kingdom) Lewis Hamilton	Ferrari	1:18.730	1:17.803	1:17.219	5^{a}
3	16	(Monaco) Charles Leclerc	Ferrari	1:18.984	1:17.626	1:17.445	2
4	12	(Italy) Kimi Antonelli	Mercedes	1:18.726	1:18.393	1:17.479	7^{b}
5	81	(Australia) Oscar Piastri	McLaren-Mercedes	1:18.891	1:17.928	1:17.684	3
6	3	(Netherlands) Max Verstappen	Red Bull Racing-Red Bull Ford	1:18.656	1:18.249	1:17.725	4
7	63	(United Kingdom) George Russell	Mercedes	1:18.856	1:18.445	1:17.760	6
8	6	(France) Isack Hadjar	Red Bull Racing-Red Bull Ford	1:18.754	1:17.872	1:17.856	8
9	41	(United Kingdom) Arvid Lindblad	Racing Bulls-Red Bull Ford	1:19.233	1:18.360	1:18.281	9
10	27	(Germany) Nico Hülkenberg	Audi	1:18.796	1:18.639	1:18.686	10
11	30	(New Zealand) Liam Lawson	Racing Bulls-Red Bull Ford	1:19.161	1:18.765	N/A	11
12	10	(France) Pierre Gasly	Alpine-Mercedes	1:19.741	1:18.844	N/A	12
13	43	(Argentina) Franco Colapinto	Alpine-Mercedes	1:19.771	1:19.027	N/A	13
14	5	(Brazil) Gabriel Bortoleto	Audi	1:19.069	1:19.105	N/A	14
15	31	(France) Esteban Ocon	Haas-Ferrari	1:20.010	1:19.734	N/A	15
16	14	(Spain) Fernando Alonso	Aston Martin Aramco-Honda	1:20.126	1:19.808	N/A	16
17	87	(United Kingdom) Oliver Bearman	Haas-Ferrari	1:20.233	N/A	N/A	17
18	55	(Spain) Carlos Sainz Jr.	Atlassian Williams-Mercedes	1:20.621	N/A	N/A	18
19	23	(Thailand) Alexander Albon	Atlassian Williams-Mercedes	1:20.658	N/A	N/A	19
20	18	(Canada) Lance Stroll	Aston Martin Aramco-Honda	1:20.659	N/A	N/A	20
21	77	(Finland) Valtteri Bottas	Cadillac-Ferrari	1:20.886	N/A	N/A	21
22	11	(Mexico) Sergio Pérez	Cadillac-Ferrari	1:21.322	N/A	N/A	PL^{c}
107% time: 1:23.756

Notes

- ^a – Lewis Hamilton received a three-place grid penalty for impeding Oscar Piastri in Q3.
- ^b – Kimi Antonelli received a three-place grid penalty for a yellow flag infringement.
- ^c – Sergio Pérez qualified 22nd, but was required to start the race from the pit lane as his car was modified under parc fermé conditions.

== Race ==
The race was held on 26 July 2026, at 15:00 local time (UTC+2), and was run for 70 laps.

=== Race report ===
The 70-lap race took place in hot and dry conditions, with the track temperature reaching approximately 55 °C (131 °F). Twenty-one drivers formed on the grid, while Sergio Pérez started from the pit lane following set up changes to his Cadillac. Lando Norris (McLaren) started from pole position alongside Charles Leclerc (Ferrari), with Oscar Piastri and Max Verstappen (Red Bull) on the second row. Lewis Hamilton started fifth and Kimi Antonelli seventh after both had received three-place grid penalties following qualifying. Norris, Piastri and Verstappen selected the medium-compound tyres, while Leclerc and Hamilton were among six drivers to start on softs; the remainder also began on mediums.

Norris retained the lead into turn one, while Piastri passed Leclerc to move into second. Piastri then gained a run on his teammate approaching turn two and used a cutback at the exit to take the lead after Norris ran wide. Verstappen emerged in third after going wheel-to-wheel with the Ferraris, with Hamilton passing Leclerc for fourth. Further back, George Russell (Mercedes) triggered his car's anti-stall system at the start and fell from sixth to nineteenth.

Piastri maintained a lead of approximately one second over Norris during the opening stint, with the two McLarens gradually pulling away from Verstappen. Norris repeatedly told McLaren that he was faster than his teammate, but the team decided against exchanging their positions on a circuit where following another car closely was difficult. Verstappen reported problems with the suspension and gear shifts of his Red Bull, with Hamilton close behind, although Hamilton was unable to complete a pass. Russell recovered rapidly through the lower order and had reached eleventh place by lap 13.

Hamilton made the first pit stop among the leading drivers on lap 14, changing from soft to hard tyres. Verstappen responded one lap later and rejoined behind Hamilton, but regained the position with a late-braking pass into turn one at the beginning of the following lap. Valtteri Bottas retired his Cadillac shortly afterwards with an overheated left-front brake, which had begun to smoke and catch fire as he returned to the pits. Piastri and Leclerc stopped on lap 17, followed by Norris one lap later; Piastri narrowly retained his advantage over his teammate at the pit exit. Antonelli and Isack Hadjar, who had yet to stop, briefly led the race before Antonelli changed to hard tyres on lap 22.

After the first pit stop cycle, Piastri continued to lead Norris, with Verstappen, Hamilton and Leclerc following. Norris remained within approximately one second of Piastri but ran wide at turn four on lap 29 while applying pressure to his teammate. Hamilton made his second stop on lap 30, and Norris asked McLaren to pit him before Piastri in an attempt to gain the undercut. McLaren rejected the request and stopped Piastri for another set of hard tyres on lap 33, leaving Norris in clear air and allowing him to extend his second tyre stint.

After rejoining, Piastri encountered Carlos Sainz Jr. (Williams), who was racing Fernando Alonso (Aston Martin) while blue flags were being displayed. Sainz remained on the racing line and contact occurred at the exit of turn two as Piastri attempted to lap him, forcing Piastri partly off the circuit and costing him further time. The stewards determined that Sainz was responsible for the collision and imposed a five-second time penalty.

Norris recorded faster laps than Piastri despite using older tyres. Leclerc made his second stop on lap 37, while Norris continued until the end of lap 39 and rejoined approximately eight-tenths of a second ahead of Piastri. The gap quickly increased as Norris took advantage of his fresher tyres. Verstappen subsequently made his second stop for soft tyres, while Antonelli continued to lead on the road. Norris caught and passed Antonelli on lap 46 to reclaim first place, after which he opened a substantial advantage over Piastri. Pérez retired after completing 48 laps with a problem at the front-left of his Cadillac.

Antonelli made his second stop on lap 54, changing to soft tyres and rejoining in sixth place. Two laps later, Piastri reported a gearbox failure and stopped beside the circuit between turns one and two. A virtual safety car was deployed to recover his car. Norris, Hamilton and Leclerc stopped for fresh tyres, while Verstappen remained on track and gained second place. Antonelli, who had stopped shortly before the interruption, also stayed out. Hamilton initially emerged ahead of Antonelli, but returned the position after replays showed that the Mercedes had reached the relevant virtual-safety-car line first.

Hamilton was subsequently given a five-second time penalty for exceeding the 80 km/h (50 mph) pit lane speed limit by 0.1 km/h (0.062 mph) during his final stop. He pressured Antonelli during the closing laps but was unable to pass. Norris controlled the restart and won over Verstappen, with Antonelli completing the podium. Hamilton crossed the finish line fourth but his penalty demoted him behind Leclerc to fifth.

Hadjar finished sixth, ahead of Russell, whose recovery ended in seventh. The final points positions were decided by a four-car contest between Racing Bulls and Audi. The two-stopping Liam Lawson and Nico Hülkenberg used their fresher tyres to pass the one-stopping Arvid Lindblad and Gabriel Bortoleto, finishing eighth and ninth respectively. Lindblad retained tenth place ahead of Bortoleto. Pierre Gasly finished twelfth, while Lance Stroll and Alonso placed thirteenth and fourteenth in Aston Martin's upgraded cars.

Franco Colapinto, Esteban Ocon, Alexander Albon, Sainz and Oliver Bearman completed the classified finishers. Bearman received a five-second time penalty for ignoring blue flags. Piastri, Pérez and Bottas were the race's three retirements.

==== Post-race and championship impact ====
Norris's victory was the twelfth of his Formula One career, his first of the 2026 season and his first since becoming World Champion. It was also his second consecutive Hungarian Grand Prix victory and the first time he had won more than once at the same circuit. Together with Piastri's victory in 2024, the result gave McLaren a third consecutive win at the Hungaroring and extended the constructor's record at the circuit to fourteen victories.

The result represented McLaren's first Grand Prix win of the season and followed the introduction of a substantial upgrade package. Norris described his race pace as among the strongest he had produced and said that the car had been particularly confidence-inspiring to drive. The victory increased his championship total to 128 points and reduced his deficit to fourth-placed Leclerc to ten points. McLaren team principal Andrea Stella had considered Ferrari the pre-race favourite because of its low-speed cornering performance, but stated that McLaren's upgrades had performed as intended.

Antonelli's third-place finish increased his Drivers' Championship total to 219 points. He entered the summer break 50 points ahead of Hamilton, and 59 ahead of Russell. Leclerc held fourth with 138 points, followed by Norris with 128, Verstappen with 109 and Piastri with 92. In the Constructors' Championship, Mercedes remained first with 379 points, 72 ahead of Ferrari. McLaren increased its total to 220 points, with Red Bull fourth with 177.

=== Race classification ===
Pos.	No.	Driver	Constructor	Laps	Time/Retired	Grid	Points
1	1	(United Kingdom) Lando Norris	McLaren-Mercedes	70	1:39:56.180	1	25
2	3	(Netherlands) Max Verstappen	Red Bull Racing-Red Bull Ford	70	+15.080	4	18
3	12	(Italy) Kimi Antonelli	Mercedes	70	+18.728	7	15
4	16	(Monaco) Charles Leclerc	Ferrari	70	+23.840	2	12
5	44	(United Kingdom) Lewis Hamilton	Ferrari	70	+24.540^{a}	5	10
6	6	(France) Isack Hadjar	Red Bull Racing-Red Bull Ford	70	+55.488	8	8
7	63	(United Kingdom) George Russell	Mercedes	70	+57.503	6	6
8	30	(New Zealand) Liam Lawson	Racing Bulls-Red Bull Ford	69	+1 lap	11	4
9	27	(Germany) Nico Hülkenberg	Audi	69	+1 lap	10	2
10	41	(United Kingdom) Arvid Lindblad	Racing Bulls-Red Bull Ford	69	+1 lap	9	1
11	5	(Brazil) Gabriel Bortoleto	Audi	69	+1 lap	14	
12	10	(France) Pierre Gasly	Alpine-Mercedes	69	+1 lap	12	
13	18	(Canada) Lance Stroll	Aston Martin Aramco-Honda	69	+1 lap	20	
14	14	(Spain) Fernando Alonso	Aston Martin Aramco-Honda	69	+1 lap	16	
15	43	(Argentina) Franco Colapinto	Alpine-Mercedes	68	+2 laps	13	
16	31	(France) Esteban Ocon	Haas-Ferrari	68	+2 laps	15	
17	23	(Thailand) Alexander Albon	Atlassian Williams-Mercedes	68	+2 laps	19	
18	55	(Spain) Carlos Sainz Jr.	Atlassian Williams-Mercedes	68	+2 laps	18	
19	87	(United Kingdom) Oliver Bearman	Haas-Ferrari	68	+2 laps^{b}	17	
Ret	81	(Australia) Oscar Piastri	McLaren-Mercedes	55	Gearbox	3	
Ret	11	(Mexico) Sergio Pérez	Cadillac-Ferrari	48	Suspension	PL	
Ret	77	(Finland) Valtteri Bottas	Cadillac-Ferrari	13	Brakes	21	

Notes

- ^a – Lewis Hamilton finished fourth, but received a five-second time penalty for speeding in the pit lane.
- ^b – Oliver Bearman finished seventeenth, but received a five-second time penalty for ignoring blue flags.

== Championship standings after the race ==
Drivers' Championship standings

Pos.	Driver	Points
1	(Italy) Kimi Antonelli	219
2	(United Kingdom) Lewis Hamilton	169
3	(United Kingdom) George Russell	160
4	(Monaco) Charles Leclerc	138
5	(United Kingdom) Lando Norris	128

Constructors' Championship standings

Pos.	Constructor	Points
1	(Germany) Mercedes	379
2	(Italy) Ferrari	307
3	(United Kingdom) McLaren-Mercedes	222
4	(Austria) Red Bull Racing-Red Bull Ford	180
5	(Italy) Racing Bulls-Red Bull Ford	70

- Note: Only the top five positions are included for both sets of standings.

== See also ==
- 2026 Budapest Formula 2 round
- 2026 Budapest Formula 3 round

Previous race: 2026 Belgian Grand Prix	FIA Formula One World Championship; 2026 season	Next race: 2026 Dutch Grand Prix
Previous race: 2025 Hungarian Grand Prix	Hungarian Grand Prix	Next race: 2027 Hungarian Grand Prix
