= 2026 Canadian Grand Prix =

Formula One motor race

Race 5 of 23 (Note: At the time of the event Formula One planned to hold twenty-two Grands Prix.) in the 2026 Formula One World Championship
← Previous race	Next race →
- Layout of the Circuit Gilles Villeneuve, Canada

Race details
- Date: 24 May 2026
- Official name: Formula 1 Lenovo Grand Prix du Canada 2026
- Location: Circuit Gilles Villeneuve, Montréal, Quebec, Canada
- Course: Semi-permanent racing facility
- Course length: 4.361 km (2.710 miles)
- Distance: 68 laps, 296.548 km (184.266 miles)
- Scheduled distance: 70 laps, 305.270 km (189.686 miles)
- Weather: Cloudy. Max. ambient temp. 14.6°C, max. track temp. 19.1°C.
- Attendance: 360,000

Pole position
Driver	(United Kingdom) George Russell	Mercedes
- Time: 1:12.578

Fastest lap
Driver	(Italy) Kimi Antonelli	Mercedes
- Time: 1:14.210 on lap 68

Podium
First	(Italy) Kimi Antonelli	Mercedes
Second	(United Kingdom) Lewis Hamilton	Ferrari
Third	(Netherlands) Max Verstappen	Red Bull Racing-Red Bull Ford

The 2026 Canadian Grand Prix (officially known as the Formula 1 Lenovo Grand Prix du Canada 2026) was a scheduled Formula One motor race which was held on 24 May 2026 at the Circuit Gilles Villeneuve in Montreal, Quebec, Canada. It was the fifth round of the 2026 Formula One World Championship and the third of six Grands Prix in the season to utilise the sprint format.

George Russell (Mercedes) converted pole position for the sprint event to a victory, following a short battle for the lead with Kimi Antonelli. Antonelli would eventually fall to third behind Lando Norris (McLaren). Russell also took pole position for the main race, where he and Antonelli again battled in the opening stages before a battery failure led to his first retirement since the 2024 British Grand Prix. Antonelli inherited the lead and the race win, taking his fourth consecutive victory. The podium was completed by Lewis Hamilton (Ferrari) and Max Verstappen (Red Bull), the latter taking his and Red Bull's first podium of the season, and Ford's first podium since Jordan Grand Prix's victory at the 2003 Brazilian Grand Prix.

== Background ==
The event was held at the Circuit Gilles Villeneuve on Île Notre-Dame in Montreal for the 45th time in the circuit's history, across the weekend of 22–24 May. The Grand Prix was the fifth round of the 2026 Formula One World Championship and the 55th running of the Canadian Grand Prix as a round of the Formula One World Championship. It was also the third of six Grands Prix in the season to utilise the sprint format and the first time that the Canadian Grand Prix featured it.

=== Championship standings before the race ===
Going into the weekend, Kimi Antonelli led the Drivers' Championship with 100 points, 20 points ahead of Mercedes teammate George Russell in second, and a further 21 points ahead of Charles Leclerc (Ferrari) in third. Mercedes, with 180 points, led the Constructors' Championship from Ferrari and McLaren, who were second and third with 110 and 94 points, respectively.

=== Entrants ===
The drivers and teams were the same as the season entry list with no additional stand-in drivers for the race.

=== Tyre choices ===
Tyre supplier Pirelli brought the C3, C4, and C5 tyre compounds—the softest three in their range (designated hard, medium, and soft, respectively)—for teams to use at the event.

== Practice ==
The sole free practice session was held on 22 May 2026, at 12:30 local time (UTC–4), and was topped by Kimi Antonelli (Mercedes) ahead of his teammate George Russell and Lewis Hamilton (Ferrari).

== Sprint qualifying ==
Sprint qualifying was held on 22 May 2026, at 16:30 local time (UTC–4), and determined the starting grid order of the sprint.

=== Sprint qualifying report ===
Mercedes' George Russell took pole position for the sprint, ahead of teammate Kimi Antonelli and McLaren's Lando Norris. A red flag was observed at the end of SQ1 due to a crash for Fernando Alonso. While Alonso progressed to SQ2, Aston Martin's first SQ2 appearance of the year, he was unable to set a further lap time. Alexander Albon and Liam Lawson, who both experienced car-related issues following the earlier practice session, sat out qualifying and made up the final two spots on the grid.

=== Sprint qualifying classification ===
Pos.	No.	Driver	Constructor	Qualifying times			Sprint grid
Pos.	No.	Driver	Constructor	SQ1	SQ2	SQ3	Sprint grid
1	63	(United Kingdom) George Russell	Mercedes	1:14.772	1:13.026	1:12.965	1
2	12	(Italy) Kimi Antonelli	Mercedes	1:14.010	1:13.551	1:13.033	2
3	1	(United Kingdom) Lando Norris	McLaren-Mercedes	1:14.265	1:13.957	1:13.280	3
4	81	(Australia) Oscar Piastri	McLaren-Mercedes	1:14.665	1:13.858	1:13.299	4
5	44	(United Kingdom) Lewis Hamilton	Ferrari	1:13.889	1:13.465	1:13.326	5
6	16	(Monaco) Charles Leclerc	Ferrari	1:15.006	1:13.554	1:13.410	6
7	3	(Netherlands) Max Verstappen	Red Bull Racing-Red Bull Ford	1:14.028	1:14.412	1:13.504	7
8	6	(France) Isack Hadjar	Red Bull Racing-Red Bull Ford	1:14.541	1:14.239	1:13.605	8
9	41	(United Kingdom) Arvid Lindblad	Racing Bulls-Red Bull Ford	1:14.517	1:14.140	1:13.737	9
10	55	(Spain) Carlos Sainz Jr.	Atlassian Williams-Mercedes	1:15.500	1:14.547	1:14.536	10
11	27	(Germany) Nico Hülkenberg	Audi	1:15.673	1:14.595	N/A	11
12	5	(Brazil) Gabriel Bortoleto	Audi	1:15.801	1:14.627	N/A	12
13	43	(Argentina) Franco Colapinto	Alpine-Mercedes	1:15.484	1:14.702	N/A	13
14	31	(France) Esteban Ocon	Haas-Ferrari	1:15.760	1:14.928	N/A	14
15	87	(United Kingdom) Oliver Bearman	Haas-Ferrari	1:15.872	1:15.197	N/A	PL^{a}
16	14	(Spain) Fernando Alonso	Aston Martin Aramco-Honda	1:15.760	No time	N/A	15
17	11	(Mexico) Sergio Pérez	Cadillac-Ferrari	1:16.002	N/A	N/A	16
18	18	(Canada) Lance Stroll	Aston Martin Aramco-Honda	1:16.354	N/A	N/A	17
19	10	(France) Pierre Gasly	Alpine-Mercedes	1:16.642	N/A	N/A	PL^{a}
20	77	(Finland) Valtteri Bottas	Cadillac-Ferrari	1:16.866	N/A	N/A	PL^{a}
107% time: 1:19.061
—	23	(Thailand) Alexander Albon	Atlassian Williams-Mercedes	No time	N/A	N/A	PL^{b}
—	30	(New Zealand) Liam Lawson	Racing Bulls-Red Bull Ford	No time	N/A	N/A	18^{b}

Notes

- ^a – Oliver Bearman, Pierre Gasly and Valtteri Bottas qualified 15th, 19th and 20th, respectively, but they were required to start the sprint from the pit lane as their cars were modified under parc fermé conditions.
- ^b – Alexander Albon and Liam Lawson failed to set a time during sprint qualifying. They were permitted to race in the sprint at the stewards' discretion. Albon started the sprint from the pit lane as his car was modified under parc fermé conditions.

== Sprint ==
The sprint was held on 23 May 2026, at 12:00 local time (UTC–4), and was run for 23 laps.

=== Sprint report ===
Oliver Bearman (Haas), Pierre Gasly (Alpine), Valtteri Bottas (Cadillac), Alexander Albon (Williams), and Lance Stroll (Aston Martin) started from the pit lane. Stroll, Sergio Perez and Bottas, opted to start on the soft compound tyre, while the rest of the field opted for medium compounds. At the race start, Russell held first into turn 1, with Mercedes teammate Kimi Antonelli close behind. McLaren's Lando Norris held third, while his teammate Oscar Piastri was overtaken for fourth by Ferrari's Lewis Hamilton. In the midfield, Audi's Nico Hülkenberg ran off the track, losing four positions. Stroll was also noted for a potential start infringement. During lap 5, Antonelli and Russell went wheel to wheel at turn 2, and Antonelli ran off the track and lost second to Norris. Red Bull's Isack Hadjar pitted with an engine issue, before returning to the track a few laps after. For the remainder of the sprint, the top three remained close, with Russell finishing first ahead of Norris and Antonelli. They were followed by Piastri, nione seconds back, who had overtaken Hamilton on the final lap for fourth. His teammate Charles Leclerc took advantage of this move to progress to the fifth position, with Hamilton finishing in sixth. Max Verstappen and Arvid Lindblad respectively finished seventh and eighth to round out the point scorers.

=== Sprint classification ===
Pos.	No.	Driver	Constructor	Laps	Time/Retired	Grid	Points
1	63	(United Kingdom) George Russell	Mercedes	23	28:50.951	1	8
2	1	(United Kingdom) Lando Norris	McLaren-Mercedes	23	+1.272	3	7
3	12	(Italy) Kimi Antonelli	Mercedes	23	+1.843	2	6
4	81	(Australia) Oscar Piastri	McLaren-Mercedes	23	+9.797	4	5
5	16	(Monaco) Charles Leclerc	Ferrari	23	+9.929	6	4
6	44	(United Kingdom) Lewis Hamilton	Ferrari	23	+10.545	5	3
7	3	(Netherlands) Max Verstappen	Red Bull Racing-Red Bull Ford	23	+15.935	7	2
8	41	(United Kingdom) Arvid Lindblad	Racing Bulls-Red Bull Ford	23	+29.710	9	1
9	43	(Argentina) Franco Colapinto	Alpine-Mercedes	23	+31.621	13	
10	55	(Spain) Carlos Sainz Jr.	Atlassian Williams-Mercedes	23	+36.793	10	
11	30	(New Zealand) Liam Lawson	Racing Bulls-Red Bull Ford	23	+1:01.344	18	
12	5	(Brazil) Gabriel Bortoleto	Audi	23	+1:01.814	12	
13	31	(France) Esteban Ocon	Haas-Ferrari	23	+1:04.209	14	
14	11	(Mexico) Sergio Pérez	Cadillac-Ferrari	23	+1:10.402^{a}	16	
15	27	(Germany) Nico Hülkenberg	Audi	23	+1:12.158^{b}	11	
16	18	(Canada) Lance Stroll	Aston Martin Aramco-Honda	22	+1 lap	PL^{c}	
17	77	(Finland) Valtteri Bottas	Cadillac-Ferrari	22	+1 lap	PL	
18	87	(United Kingdom) Oliver Bearman	Haas-Ferrari	22	+1 lap	PL	
19	23	(Thailand) Alexander Albon	Atlassian Williams-Mercedes	22	+1 lap	PL	
20	10	(France) Pierre Gasly	Alpine-Mercedes	22	+1 lap	PL	
21	6	(France) Isack Hadjar	Red Bull Racing-Red Bull Ford	20	+3 laps	8	
Ret	14	(Spain) Fernando Alonso	Aston Martin Aramco-Honda	15	Engine	15	

Notes

- ^a – Sergio Pérez finished 11th, but received a ten-second time penalty for forcing Liam Lawson off the track.
- ^b – Nico Hülkenberg finished 13th, but received a ten-second time penalty for leaving the track and gaining an advantage.
- ^c – Lance Stroll started from the pit lane due to issues with the front suspension.

== Qualifying ==
Qualifying was held on 23 May 2026, at 16:00 local time (UTC–4), and determined the starting grid order for the main race.

=== Qualifying classification ===
Pos.	No.	Driver	Constructor	Qualifying times			Final grid
Pos.	No.	Driver	Constructor	Q1	Q2	Q3	Final grid
1	63	(United Kingdom) George Russell	Mercedes	1:13.953	1:13.079	1:12.578	1
2	12	(Italy) Kimi Antonelli	Mercedes	1:13.380	1:13.076	1:12.646	2
3	1	(United Kingdom) Lando Norris	McLaren-Mercedes	1:13.503	1:13.049	1:12.729	3
4	81	(Australia) Oscar Piastri	McLaren-Mercedes	1:13.559	1:13.285	1:12.781	4
5	44	(United Kingdom) Lewis Hamilton	Ferrari	1:13.767	1:13.041	1:12.868	5
6	3	(Netherlands) Max Verstappen	Red Bull Racing-Red Bull Ford	1:14.067	1:13.479	1:12.907	6
7	6	(France) Isack Hadjar	Red Bull Racing-Red Bull Ford	1:13.654	1:12.975	1:12.935	7
8	16	(Monaco) Charles Leclerc	Ferrari	1:13.825	1:13.496	1:12.976	8
9	41	(United Kingdom) Arvid Lindblad	Racing Bulls-Red Bull Ford	1:13.895	1:13.548	1:13.280	9
10	43	(Argentina) Franco Colapinto	Alpine-Mercedes	1:14.466	1:13.857	1:13.697	10
11	27	(Germany) Nico Hülkenberg	Audi	1:14.562	1:13.886	N/A	11
12	30	(New Zealand) Liam Lawson	Racing Bulls-Red Bull Ford	1:14.346	1:13.897	N/A	12
13	5	(Brazil) Gabriel Bortoleto	Audi	1:14.775	1:14.071	N/A	13
14	10	(France) Pierre Gasly	Alpine-Mercedes	1:14.698	1:14.187	N/A	14
15	55	(Spain) Carlos Sainz Jr.	Atlassian Williams-Mercedes	1:14.276	1:14.273	N/A	15
16	87	(United Kingdom) Oliver Bearman	Haas-Ferrari	1:14.449	1:14.416	N/A	16
17	31	(France) Esteban Ocon	Haas-Ferrari	1:14.845	N/A	N/A	17
18	23	(Thailand) Alexander Albon	Atlassian Williams-Mercedes	1:14.851	N/A	N/A	18
19	14	(Spain) Fernando Alonso	Aston Martin Aramco-Honda	1:15.196	N/A	N/A	19
20	11	(Mexico) Sergio Pérez	Cadillac-Ferrari	1:15.429	N/A	N/A	20
21	18	(Canada) Lance Stroll	Aston Martin Aramco-Honda	1:16.195	N/A	N/A	PL^{a}
22	77	(Finland) Valtteri Bottas	Cadillac-Ferrari	1:16.272	N/A	N/A	21
107% time: 1:18.516

Notes

- ^a – Lance Stroll qualified 21st, but was required to start the race from the pit lane as his car was modified during parc fermé conditions.

== Race ==
The race was held on 24 May 2026, at 16:00 local time (UTC–4), and was scheduled to be run for 70 laps before being reduced as two extra formation laps were held after Arvid Lindblad (Racing Bulls) suffered an issue.

=== Race report ===
Rain fell immediately prior to the race start, leading to varied tyre strategies across the field. McLaren, Audi, Cadillac and Carlos Sainz Jr. of Williams opted to start on intermediate-wet tyres, while the two Racing Bulls drivers and Alpine’s Franco Colapinto started on medium tyres. The remainder of the field chose soft compounds. As in the sprint, Aston Martin’s Lance Stroll started from the pit lane after parts of his engine were changed under parc fermé conditions. The start was delayed and an additional formation lap was completed after Arvid Lindblad's car stalled due to a clutch issue, reducing the race distance to 68 laps.

At the start, Lando Norris moved from third to first into turn 1, followed by the Mercedes pair of Kimi Antonelli and George Russell, with Russell losing a position to his teammate. Lewis Hamilton (Ferrari) overtook Oscar Piastri (McLaren) to move into fourth place. At the end of the first lap, McLaren determined that their tyre choice was incorrect and both Norris and Piastri pitted to switch from intermediates to dry-weather tyres, dropping them to the rear of the field alongside other drivers who had started on intermediates. After the initial pit cycle, Antonelli led from Russell and Hamilton. On lap 6, Russell overtook Antonelli on the back straight, before the Mercedes drivers continued to exchange positions over the following laps. Max Verstappen (Red Bull) later moved into third place ahead of Hamilton, who was experiencing power issues. Further back, Norris and Piastri recovered through the field, running in 11th and 13th respectively. On lap 13, yellow flags were deployed after Piastri collided with Alexander Albon, forcing Albon to retire. Piastri pitted for a new front wing and received a ten-second penalty for the incident.

On lap 30, Russell slowed and retired due to a battery issue, triggering a virtual safety car while his car was recovered. Most of the field pitted during this period, with Antonelli rejoining on medium tyres and maintaining a lead of approximately 4.6 seconds over Verstappen. By lap 35, Antonelli led Verstappen and Hamilton. During the pit cycle, Charles Leclerc lost position to Isack Hadjar after Ferrari completed a double stack pit stop. Hadjar later received a ten-second penalty for multiple changes of direction while defending against Leclerc, allowing Leclerc to regain the position. On lap 40, Norris was catching Liam Lawson, when his gearbox suddenly failed, forcing him to park on the same spot at turn 10 where Albon retired. On lap 43, Sergio Pérez (Cadillac) retired due to a front-right suspension failure. Nine laps later, another virtual safety car was deployed to clear debris from the track, with Antonelli leading Verstappen by 4.3 seconds at the restart. A further virtual safety car was deployed on lap 53 to clear debris from the track at turn 11. Hadjar and Piastri both served time penalties during this period and rejoined in fifth and thirteenth positions respectively. After the restart, Antonelli extended his lead to around eight seconds, while Hamilton closed in on Verstappen for second place.

On lap 62, Hamilton passed Verstappen to take second position. Hadjar received a stop-and-go penalty for a yellow flag infringement but retained fifth place ahead of Colapinto after serving it. Antonelli won the race, securing his fourth consecutive victory, ahead of Hamilton and Verstappen. Leclerc finished fourth, followed by Hadjar, Colapinto, Liam Lawson, Pierre Gasly, Sainz. and Oliver Bearman, who completed the points positions.

=== Race classification ===
Pos.	No.	Driver	Constructor	Laps	Time/Retired	Grid	Points
1	12	(Italy) Kimi Antonelli	Mercedes	68	1:28:15.758	2	25
2	44	(United Kingdom) Lewis Hamilton	Ferrari	68	+10.768	5	18
3	3	(Netherlands) Max Verstappen	Red Bull Racing-Red Bull Ford	68	+11.276	6	15
4	16	(Monaco) Charles Leclerc	Ferrari	68	+44.151	8	12
5	6	(France) Isack Hadjar	Red Bull Racing-Red Bull Ford	67	+1 lap	7	10
6	43	(Argentina) Franco Colapinto	Alpine-Mercedes	67	+1 lap	10	8
7	30	(New Zealand) Liam Lawson	Racing Bulls-Red Bull Ford	67	+1 lap	12	6
8	10	(France) Pierre Gasly	Alpine-Mercedes	67	+1 lap	14	4
9	55	(Spain) Carlos Sainz Jr.	Atlassian Williams-Mercedes	67	+1 lap	15	2
10	87	(United Kingdom) Oliver Bearman	Haas-Ferrari	67	+1 lap	16	1
11	81	(Australia) Oscar Piastri	McLaren-Mercedes	66	+2 laps	4	
12	27	(Germany) Nico Hülkenberg	Audi	66	+2 laps	11	
13	5	(Brazil) Gabriel Bortoleto	Audi	66	+2 laps^{a}	13	
14	31	(France) Esteban Ocon	Haas-Ferrari	66	+2 laps	17	
15	18	(Canada) Lance Stroll	Aston Martin Aramco-Honda	64	+4 laps	PL	
16	77	(Finland) Valtteri Bottas	Cadillac-Ferrari	64	+4 laps	21	
Ret	11	(Mexico) Sergio Pérez	Cadillac-Ferrari	39	Suspension	20	
Ret	1	(United Kingdom) Lando Norris	McLaren-Mercedes	38	Gearbox	3	
Ret	63	(United Kingdom) George Russell	Mercedes	29	Engine	1	
Ret	14	(Spain) Fernando Alonso	Aston Martin Aramco-Honda	23	Broken seat	19	
Ret	23	(Thailand) Alexander Albon	Atlassian Williams-Mercedes	11	Collision	18	
DNS	41	(United Kingdom) Arvid Lindblad	Racing Bulls-Red Bull Ford	0	Gearbox	—^{b}	

Notes

- ^a – Gabriel Bortoleto received a five-second time penalty for a virtual safety car infringement. His final position was not affected by the penalty.
- ^b – Arvid Lindblad did not start the race due to a gearbox issue. His place on the grid was left vacant.

== Championship standings after the race ==
Drivers' Championship standings

	Pos.	Driver	Points
	1	(Italy) Kimi Antonelli	131
	2	(United Kingdom) George Russell	88
	3	(Monaco) Charles Leclerc	75
1	4	(United Kingdom) Lewis Hamilton	72
1	5	(United Kingdom) Lando Norris	58

Constructors' Championship standings

Pos.	Constructor	Points
1	(Germany) Mercedes	219
2	(Italy) Ferrari	147
3	(United Kingdom) McLaren-Mercedes	106
4	(Austria) Red Bull Racing-Red Bull Ford	57
5	(France) Alpine-Mercedes	35

- Note: Only the top five positions are included for both sets of standings.

== See also ==
- 2026 Montreal Formula 2 round

== Notes ==
Previous race: 2026 Miami Grand Prix	FIA Formula One World Championship; 2026 season	Next race: 2026 Monaco Grand Prix
Previous race: 2025 Canadian Grand Prix	Canadian Grand Prix	Next race: 2027 Canadian Grand Prix
