= 2026 United States Grand Prix =

Eighteenth round of the 2026 F1 season

Race 18 of 23 in the 2026 Formula One World Championship
← Previous race	Next race →
- Layout of the Circuit of the Americas

Race details
- Date: October 25, 2026
- Official name: Formula 1 MSC Cruises United States Grand Prix 2026
- Location: Circuit of the Americas; Austin, Texas, United States
- Course: Permanent racing facility
- Course length: 5.513 km (3.426 miles)
- Distance: 56 laps, 308.432 km (191.650 miles)
- Weather: Sunny
- Attendance: 467,000

Pole position
Driver	(Italy) Kimi Antonelli	Mercedes
- Time: 1:34.035

Fastest lap
Driver	(Monaco) Charles Leclerc	Ferrari
- Time: 1:37.976 on lap 42

Podium
First	(Italy) Kimi Antonelli	Mercedes
Second	(Monaco) Charles Leclerc	Ferrari
Third	(Netherlands) Max Verstappen	Red Bull Racing-Red Bull Ford

The 2026 United States Grand Prix (officially known as the Formula 1 MSC Cruises United States Grand Prix 2026) was a Formula One motor race that was held on October 25, 2026, at the Circuit of the Americas in Austin, Texas, United States. It was the eighteenth round of the 2026 Formula One World Championship. Championship leader Kimi Antonelli (Mercedes) took his seventh pole position which he converted into his ninth Grand Prix victory. Charles Leclerc (Ferrari) and Max Verstappen (Red Bull) came in second and third place, respectively.

== Background ==
The event was held at the Circuit of the Americas in Austin, Texas, for the 14th time in the circuit's history, across the weekend of October 23–25, 2026. The Grand Prix was the eighteenth round of the 2026 Formula One World Championship and the 47th running of the United States Grand Prix as a round of the Formula One World Championship.

=== Championship standings before the race ===
Going into the weekend, Kimi Antonelli led the Drivers' Championship with 340 points, 102 points ahead of teammate George Russell in second and 111 ahead of Lewis Hamilton in third. Mercedes, with 578 points, led the Constructors' Championship from Ferrari and McLaren, who were second and third with 444 and 339 points, respectively.

==== Championship permutations ====
Going into the race, there were 150 points available across the six remaining scheduled rounds. With Antonelli leading the championship by 102 points, and with 25 of the 150 points available at this round, Antonelli had a chance to secure the title at this event. In order to do so, Antonelli needed to win the race, with Russell failing to finish in the top eight, and Hamilton failing to finish within the top four.

=== Entrants ===
The drivers and teams were the same as published in the season entry list with no additional stand-in drivers for the race. During the first practice session Sergio Pérez (Cadillac) was replaced by Colton Herta, a driver who had not raced in more than two Grands Prix, as required by the Formula One regulations.

This was Esteban Ocon's last start for Haas; he was dismissed during the Mexico City race weekend, and is not scheduled to compete in the 2027 season.

=== Tyre choices ===
Tyre supplier Pirelli selected its C2, C3, and C4 compounds—the middle three in its range—for the event, designating them as hard, medium, and soft, respectively.

== Practice ==
Three free practice sessions were held for the event. The first free practice session was held on October 23, 2026, at 12:30 local time (UTC–5), and was topped by Charles Leclerc (Ferrari) ahead of Max Verstappen (Red Bull) and Lando Norris (McLaren). The second free practice session was held on the same day, at 16:00 local time, and was topped by Leclerc ahead of Kimi Antonelli (Mercedes) and Verstappen. The third free practice session was held on October 24, 2026, at 12:30 local time, and was topped by Lewis Hamilton (Ferrari) ahead of Verstappen and Leclerc.

== Qualifying ==
Qualifying was held on October 24, 2026, at 16:00 local time (UTC–5), and determined the starting grid order for the race.

=== Qualifying report ===
In the first qualifying segment (Q1), both Mercedes drivers Kimi Antonelli and George Russell as well as McLaren's Oscar Piastri opted to start the qualifying session with the medium compound as opposed to the soft. Ferrari's Charles Leclerc set the early pace ahead of the Red Bulls driven by Max Verstappen and Isack Hadjar, whilst Antonelli initially settled for fifth position, nearly a second behind Leclerc. Pierre Gasly's initial lap was deleted for a track limits violation, leaving him without a lap with five minutes to go. Teammate Franco Colapinto was in seventeenth place, with Liam Lawson putting it in sixth following his first attempt. On their second run, Mercedes stayed on the medium tyres in order to save the softer compound for the final two segments. Russell went on to set a personal best time, however, he saw his attempt hampered by understeer at turn 20, leaving him seventh. Despite setting the fastest times in both opening sectors, Antonelli saw himself in fifth, roughly two tenths behind Lando Norris, who topped the first segment after a significant improvement in his second run, setting the fastest middle sector. Esteban Ocon (Haas) was eliminated in 17th ahead of Lance Stroll and both Williams drivers (Carlos Sainz Jr. and Alexander Albon), with both Cadillac drivers occupying the last two places.

Going into the second qualifying segment (Q2), Verstappen initially went fastest, with Norris being his closest challenger, whilst Antonelli and Russell were third and fourth. At Audi, Gabriel Bortoleto who had already amassed a grid penalties worth 80 places for changing multiple power unit elements, planned to give his teammate Nico Hülkenberg a tow on both of his runs, Hülkenberg was eliminated from the segment alongside Bortoleto, both Alpine drivers, Haas' Oliver Bearman and Fernando Alonso. During their second runs, Russell and Antonelli managed to set fastest times in both the first and second sectors, respectively, leading them to top the time sheets with Antonelli the quicker of the two, before Leclerc went even quicker following an improvement in the final sector.

The initial benchmark of the final segment (Q3) has been set by Russell, before Antonelli topped the timing sheets by being four tenths quicker, until Verstappen was able to separate the Mercedes into second ahead of Hadjar and Leclerc, with Russell dropping to fifth. During their final runs, no driver was able to improve their respective lap times significantly. Ferrari, who were considered a favourite for pole position after topping all free practice sessions, saw their drivers Leclerc and Lewis Hamilton making errors going into turn 20 with understeer, securing fourth and fifth as Antonelli took pole position ahead of both Verstappen and Hadjar. It was Antonelli's seventh pole of the season, whilst Verstappen managed to qualify on the front row for the third consecutive Grand Prix. Norris set a lap time which put him into sixth, his lap time was deleted due to track limit violations, dropping him down to eighth behind Russell and Piastri, whilst both Racing Bulls drivers Arvid Lindblad and Lawson completed the top ten, with the latter setting no time in order to save soft tyres for Sunday's race.

=== Qualifying classification ===
Pos.	No.	Driver	Constructor	Qualifying times			Final grid
Pos.	No.	Driver	Constructor	Q1	Q2	Q3	Final grid
1	12	(Italy) Kimi Antonelli	Mercedes	1:35.390	1:34.278	1:34.035	1
2	3	(Netherlands) Max Verstappen	Red Bull Racing-Red Bull Ford	1:35.215	1:34.471	1:34.214	2
3	6	(France) Isack Hadjar	Red Bull Racing-Red Bull Ford	1:35.286	1:34.887	1:34.250	3
4	16	(Monaco) Charles Leclerc	Ferrari	1:35.200	1:34.198	1:34.267	4
5	44	(United Kingdom) Lewis Hamilton	Ferrari	1:35.355	1:34.833	1:34.311	5
6	63	(United Kingdom) George Russell	Mercedes	1:35.730	1:34.305	1:34.476	6
7	81	(Australia) Oscar Piastri	McLaren-Mercedes	1:35.842	1:34.818	1:34.803	7
8	1	(United Kingdom) Lando Norris	McLaren-Mercedes	1:35.029	1:34.539	1:35.049	8
9	41	(United Kingdom) Arvid Lindblad	Racing Bulls-Red Bull Ford	1:35.755	1:34.950	1:36.049	14^{a}
10	30	(New Zealand) Liam Lawson	Racing Bulls-Red Bull Ford	1:35.662	1:35.058	No time	9
11	10	(France) Pierre Gasly	Alpine-Mercedes	1:35.969	1:35.080	N/A	10
12	27	(Germany) Nico Hülkenberg	Audi	1:35.704	1:35.158	N/A	11
13	5	(Brazil) Gabriel Bortoleto	Audi	1:35.632	1:35.691	N/A	21^{b}
14	43	(Argentina) Franco Colapinto	Alpine-Mercedes	1:35.898	1:35.722	N/A	20^{c}
15	14	(Spain) Fernando Alonso	Aston Martin Aramco-Honda	1:36.240	1:35.818	N/A	12
16	87	(United Kingdom) Oliver Bearman	Haas-Ferrari	1:36.175	1:36.031	N/A	13
17	31	(France) Esteban Ocon	Haas-Ferrari	1:36.531	N/A	N/A	15
18	18	(Canada) Lance Stroll	Aston Martin Aramco-Honda	1:36.677	N/A	N/A	PL^{d}
19	55	(Spain) Carlos Sainz Jr.	Atlassian Williams-Mercedes	1:36.770	N/A	N/A	16
20	23	(Thailand) Alexander Albon	Atlassian Williams-Mercedes	1:36.967	N/A	N/A	17
21	11	(Mexico) Sergio Pérez	Cadillac-Ferrari	1:37.433	N/A	N/A	18
22	77	(Finland) Valtteri Bottas	Cadillac-Ferrari	1:37.523	N/A	N/A	19
107% time: 1:41.681

Notes

- ^a – Arvid Lindblad received a five-place grid penalty for exceeding his quota of power unit elements.
- ^b – Gabriel Bortoleto received a 80-place grid penalty for exceeding his quota of power unit elements.
- ^c – Franco Colapinto received a 10-place grid penalty for exceeding his quota of power unit elements.
- ^d – Lance Stroll qualified 18th, but was required to start the race from the pit lane as his car was modified under parc fermé conditions.

== Race ==
The race was held on October 25, 2026, at 15:00 local time (UTC–5), and was run for 56 laps.

=== Race report ===
Pole sitter Kimi Antonelli retained first position after the start, whilst Charles Leclerc moved up into third at the first corner and overtook Max Verstappen for second through turns 2 and 3. Lewis Hamilton overtook Isack Hadjar for fourth in the process and then attacked Verstappen, although Verstappen managed to successfully defend the position. While Antonelli started to extend his lead in the opening stages, Verstappen was set for a counterattack towards Leclerc by outbraking him successfully at the entry of turn 16. George Russell attacked Hadjar at turn 11, but went wide after locking up, causing him to leave the track, which the stewards deemed as an unfair advantage and gave him a five-second time penalty.

Further down the order, a couple of battles in the midfield were occurring, as Oliver Bearman and Pierre Gasly were fighting for tenth position, which ended in a minor collision between the two. The stewards deemed the former fully responsible for the accident and handed him a ten-second time penalty. Fernando Alonso and Alexander Albon were involved in a battle for sixteenth across multiple laps, which found its conclusion with a collision, leaving Alonso with severe damage on the floor. This caused Alonso to critisise Albon for his race craft, stating that "I think the quality of the drivers in the lower third of the grid is very low, as we saw today with Alex".

During the first sequence of pit stops, Verstappen was the first to come in for an early tyre change on lap 14, opting for a two-stop-strategy by using another set of soft tyres, with Leclerc and Hamilton covering him by opting for the same strategy, whilst both Lando Norris and Oscar Piastri decided to pit for the hard compound. During their second stints, both Verstappen and Leclerc increased the pressure on Antonelli, who stayed out on his medium compound tyre. Verstappen and Leclerc easily got past both Hadjar and Russell (who had also stayed out), with Red Bull instructing Hadjar to let Verstappen through.

On lap 25, Antonelli made his pit stop, onto the hard compound tyre, which demoted him to third. Shortly after, Verstappen reported an imbalanced feeling in the car, stating that it felt undriveable on those set of soft tyres, causing him to pit for the second time seven laps later, also onto the hard-compound tyre. Antonelli made his way past Leclerc before the latter made his second pit stop. Whilst Antonelli maintained his comfortable lead, the battle for second reached its climax, with Norris trying to make the one-stop-strategy work; both Verstappen and Leclerc closed the gap to Norris by setting fast lap times on fresher rubber.

With ten laps to go, Leclerc successfully caught up to both Norris and Verstappen. The latter overtook Norris heading into turn 1 in an attempt to defend himself from Leclerc, with Leclerc subsequently attacking Norris ahead of the fast turns 2-9 before overtaking him later at the entry of turn 13 after Norris locked up. The Ferrari driver would then catch up to Verstappen and overtake him two laps later. Norris paid tribute for a risky strategy as he got overtaken by Hamilton, who himself tried to close the gap to Verstappen, before a late virtual safety car was triggered following a late retirement of Cadillac's Valtteri Bottas due to an engine issue, neutralising the race for several laps.

Antonelli crossed the line to convert pole position into a ninth career victory. Leclerc finished second while Verstappen marginally hung onto third place from Hamilton for his sixth consecutive podium finish and tenth of 2026. Norris took fifth position ahead of Hadjar, with Piastri, Russell, Lawson and Gasly completing the top ten.

=== Post-race and championship impact ===
Despite winning the Grand Prix, the championship was not decided at this race as both Hamilton and Russell finished better than fifth and ninth, respectively. Antonelli was praised by several media outlets and experts for his commanding win, especially by team principal and CEO Toto Wolff, who described Antonelli's performance as "The best race that he's delivered" and "exceptional."

His victory allowed him to extend his points advantage in the championship to 123 and 124 points to Russell and Hamilton, respectively. Following the result, Verstappen, Leclerc and Norris were mathematically eliminated from championship contention, the first time Verstappen had not challenged for title going into the final round for six years.

The Constructors' Championship saw Mercedes and Ferrari as the only remaining contenders. Ferrari cut the points advantage towards Mercedes by one point, meaning that Mercedes led the standings by 133 points with a total of 215 still to be awarded. In the battle for third in the standings, both Red Bull and McLaren moved to 355 points, but Red Bull claimed third on countback by virtue of having more second place finishes (both teams were on two wins).

=== Race classification ===
Pos.	No.	Driver	Constructor	Laps	Time/Retired	Grid	Points
1	12	(Italy) Kimi Antonelli	Mercedes	56	1:35:16.650	1	25
2	16	(Monaco) Charles Leclerc	Ferrari	56	+13.078	4	18
3	3	(Netherlands) Max Verstappen	Red Bull Racing-Red Bull Ford	56	+17.485	2	15
4	44	(United Kingdom) Lewis Hamilton	Ferrari	56	+18.515	5	12
5	1	(United Kingdom) Lando Norris	McLaren-Mercedes	56	+30.521	8	10
6	6	(France) Isack Hadjar	Red Bull Racing-Red Bull Ford	56	+34.373	3	8
7	81	(Australia) Oscar Piastri	McLaren-Mercedes	56	+52.674	7	6
8	63	(United Kingdom) George Russell	Mercedes	56	+54.303	6	4
9	30	(New Zealand) Liam Lawson	Racing Bulls-Red Bull Ford	56	+1:19.183	9	2
10	10	(France) Pierre Gasly	Alpine-Mercedes	56	+1:27.516	10	1
11	27	(Germany) Nico Hülkenberg	Audi	56	+1:34.945	11	
12	41	(United Kingdom) Arvid Lindblad	Racing Bulls-Red Bull Ford	55	+1 lap	14	
13	5	(Brazil) Gabriel Bortoleto	Audi	55	+1 lap	21	
14	31	(France) Esteban Ocon	Haas-Ferrari	55	+1 lap	15	
15	18	(Canada) Lance Stroll	Aston Martin Aramco-Honda	55	+1 lap	PL	
16	14	(Spain) Fernando Alonso	Aston Martin Aramco-Honda	55	+1 lap	12	
17	23	(Thailand) Alexander Albon	Atlassian Williams-Mercedes	55	+1 lap	17	
18	55	(Spain) Carlos Sainz Jr.	Atlassian Williams-Mercedes	55	+1 lap	16	
19	11	(Mexico) Sergio Pérez	Cadillac-Ferrari	55	+1 lap	18	
Ret	77	(Finland) Valtteri Bottas	Cadillac-Ferrari	48	Engine	19	
Ret	43	(Argentina) Franco Colapinto	Alpine-Mercedes	35	Collision damage	20	
Ret	87	(United Kingdom) Oliver Bearman	Haas-Ferrari	24	Collision damage	13	

== Championship standings after the race ==
Drivers' Championship standings

Pos.	Driver	Points
1	(Italy) **Kimi Antonelli***	365
2	(United Kingdom) **George Russell***	242
3	(United Kingdom) **Lewis Hamilton***	241
4	(Netherlands) Max Verstappen	236
5	(Monaco) Charles Leclerc	233

Constructors' Championship standings

	Pos.	Constructor	Points
	1	(Germany) **Mercedes***	607
	2	(Italy) **Ferrari***	474
1	3	(Austria) Red Bull Racing-Red Bull Ford	355
1	4	(United Kingdom) McLaren-Mercedes	355
	5	(Italy) Racing Bulls-Red Bull Ford	102

- Note: Only the top five positions are included for both sets of standings.
- Competitors marked in bold and with an asterisk still have a theoretical chance of becoming World Champion.

Previous race: 2026 Singapore Grand Prix	FIA Formula One World Championship; 2026 season	Next race: 2026 Mexico City Grand Prix
Previous race: 2025 United States Grand Prix	United States Grand Prix	Next race: 2027 United States Grand Prix
