= Ben Hodgkinson =

British engineer

- Born: Benjamin Charles Hodgkinson; 15 June 1975 (age 50)
- Occupation: Engineer
- Employer: Red Bull Racing
- Known for: Formula One engineer
- Title: Technical Director

Benjamin Charles Hodgkinson (born 15 June 1975) is a British Formula One engineer. He is currently the technical director of Red Bull Powertrains.

== Career ==
Hodgkinson studied Mechanical Engineering at University College London. He began his motorsports career developing World Rally Championship power units and contributing to the design of turbocharged Le Mans engines, gaining experience in combustion development and forced-induction design.

He joined Ilmor Racing Engines, later known as Mercedes AMG High Performance Powertrains (HPP), in 2001 as a Design Engineer. Hodgkinson progressed through a number of design and development roles, contributing to the evolution of the Mercedes V8 engines and later the hybrid power unit programme - contributing to the power unit development programmes that underpinned Mercedes’ multiple Constructors’ and Drivers’ Championships. He was appointed Head of Mechanical Engineering in 2017, overseeing mechanical development activities at the company’s Brixworth facility.

In 2022, after more than twenty years at Mercedes HPP, Hodgkinson joined Red Bull Powertrains as Technical Director. His move coincided with Red Bull’s establishment of an in-house power unit division, the team’s largest investment since founding Red Bull Racing in 2005. Hodgkinson now leads the technical direction of Red Bull’s Formula One power unit project as it prepares to supply both Red Bull Racing and Racing Bulls with Ford Racing as the teams technical partner.
