= Haas VF-25 =

2025 Formula One car

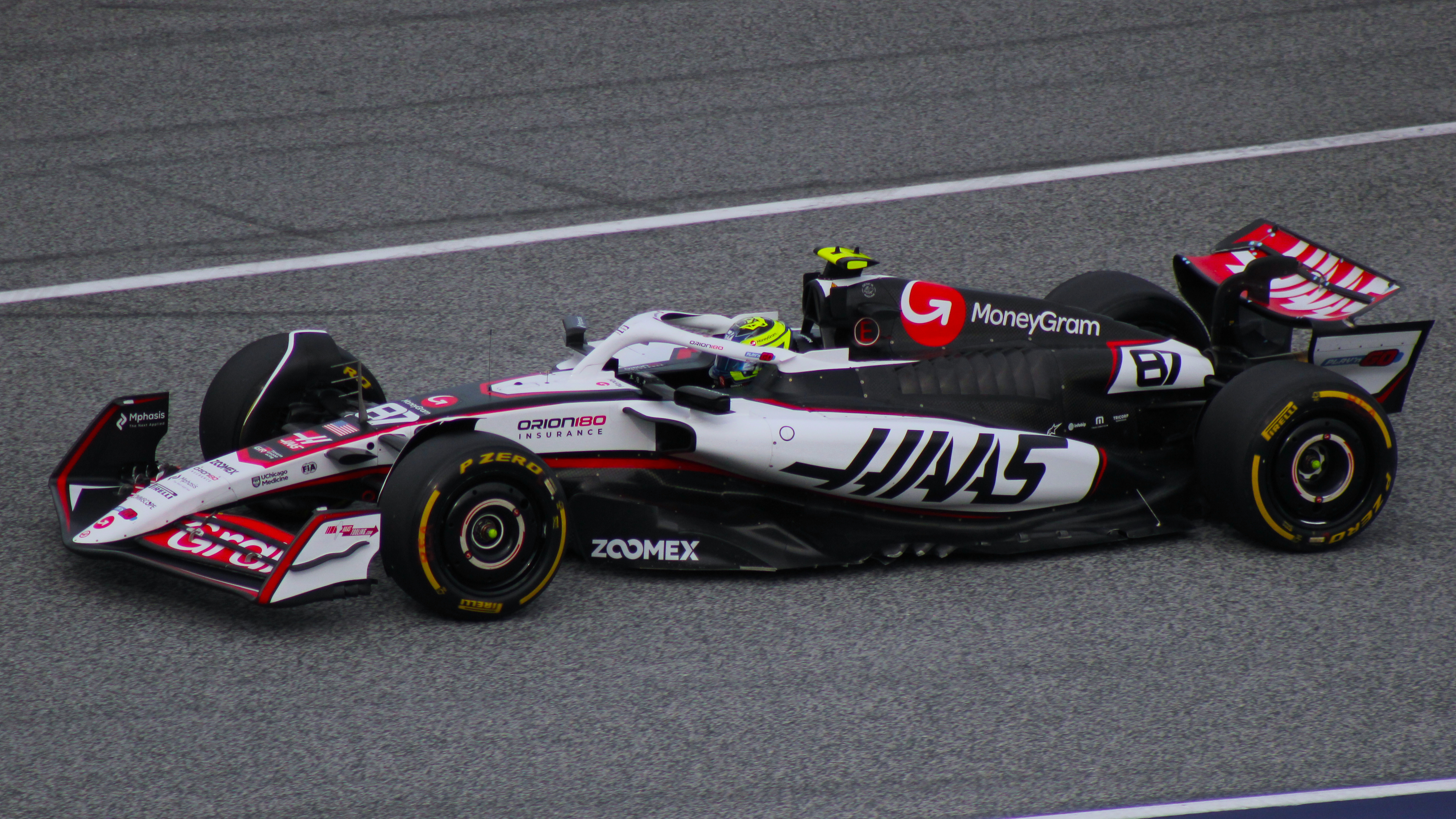
- Oliver Bearman driving the VF-25 during the Austrian Grand Prix
- Category: Formula One
- Constructor: Haas F1 Team
- Designers: Andrea De Zordo (Technical Director); Damien Brayshaw (Performance Director); Tom Coupland (Chief Designer); Jonathan Heal (Deputy Chief Designer); Davide Paganelli (Head of Aerodynamics); Rhodri Moseley (Chief Aerodynamicist)
- Predecessor: Haas VF-24
- Successor: Haas VF-26

Technical specifications
- Width: 2,000 mm (79 in)
- Engine: Ferrari 066/15 1.6 L (98 cu in) direct injection V6 turbocharged engine limited to 15,000 RPM in a mid-mounted, rear-wheel drive layout 1.6 V6
- Electric motor: Kinetic and thermal energy recovery systems
- Transmission: Ferrari 8 speed + 1 reverse
- Weight: 800 kg (including driver, excluding fuel)
- Fuel: Shell
- Lubricants: Shell
- Brakes: 6 piston carbon disk brakes
- Tyres: Pirelli P Zero (dry); Pirelli Cinturato (wet)

Competition history
- Notable entrants: MoneyGram Haas F1 Team
- Notable drivers: 31. (France) Esteban Ocon; 87. (United Kingdom) Oliver Bearman
- Debut: 2025 Australian Grand Prix
- Last event: 2025 Abu Dhabi Grand Prix
Races	Wins	Podiums	Poles	F/Laps
24	0	0	0	0

The Haas VF-25 is a Formula One racing car designed and constructed by the Haas F1 Team which competed in the 2025 Formula One World Championship. It was driven by Esteban Ocon and Oliver Bearman, both of whom were in their first full season with the team following Kevin Magnussen's departure from Formula 1 and Nico Hülkenberg's move to Sauber for the 2025 season as part of its transition to Audi.

== History ==
Ocon during the team's home race, the Las Vegas Grand Prix, where he finished ninth.

Haas unveiled the car at the F1 75 Live event on 18 February 2025. Following the predecessor focusing on a more carbon-based livery, the VF-25 features a larger presence of white colouring.

At the Japanese Grand Prix, the VF-25 sported a pink-accented livery that paid homage to cherry blossom trees. For the Canadian Grand Prix, the VF-25 sported a special livery inspired by the VF-16 to commemorate the team's 200th Grand Prix.

== Complete Formula One results ==
Key

Key
Colour	Result
Gold	Winner
Silver	Second place
Bronze	Third place
Green	Other points position
Blue	Other classified position
Blue	Not classified, finished (NC)
Purple	Not classified, retired (Ret)
Red	Did not qualify (DNQ)
Black	Disqualified (DSQ)
White	Did not start (DNS)
White	Race cancelled (C)
Blank	Did not practice (DNP)
Blank	Excluded (EX)
Blank	Did not arrive (DNA)
Blank	Withdrawn (WD)
Blank	Did not enter (empty cell)
Annotation	Meaning
P	Pole position
F	Fastest lap
Superscript number	Points-scoring position in sprint

Year	Entrant	Power unit	Tyres	Driver name	Grands Prix																								Points	WCC pos.
Year	Entrant	Power unit	Tyres	Driver name	AUS	CHN	JPN	BHR	SAU	MIA	EMI	MON	ESP	CAN	AUT	GBR	BEL	HUN	NED	ITA	AZE	SIN	USA	MXC	SAP	LVG	QAT	ABU	Points	WCC pos.
2025	MoneyGram Haas F1 Team	Ferrari 066/15 1.6 V6 t	P	(France) Esteban Ocon	13	5	18	8	14	12	Ret	7	16	9	10	13	15^{5}	16	10	15	14	18	15	9	12	9	15	7	79	8th
2025	MoneyGram Haas F1 Team	Ferrari 066/15 1.6 V6 t	P	(United Kingdom) Oliver Bearman	14	8	10	10	13	Ret	17	12	17	11	11	11	11^{7}	Ret	6	12	12	9	9	4	6	10	Ret	12	79	8th
