= Haas VF-26 =

2026 Formula One car

- Oliver Bearman driving the Haas VF-26 at the 2026 Austrian Grand Prix
- Category: Formula One
- Constructor: Haas F1 Team
- Designers: Andrea De Zordo (Technical Director); Damien Brayshaw (Performance Director); Tom Coupland (Chief Designer); Jonathan Heal (Deputy Chief Designer); Davide Paganelli (Head of Aerodynamics); Rhodri Moseley (Chief Aerodynamicist)
- Predecessor: Haas VF-25

Technical specifications
- Chassis: Carbon fiber and honeycomb composite structure
- Width: 1,900 mm (75 in)
- Wheelbase: 3,400 mm (133.9 in)
- Engine: Ferrari 067/6 1.6 L (98 cu in) direct injection V6 turbocharged engine limited to 15,000 RPM in a mid-mounted, rear-wheel drive layout 1.6 V6
- Electric motor: Kinetic
- Transmission: Ferrari 8 speed + 1 reverse
- Weight: 770 kg (including driver, excluding fuel)
- Fuel: Shell V-Power sustainable ethanol
- Lubricants: Shell Helix Ultra
- Brakes: 6 piston carbon disk brakes
- Tyres: Pirelli P Zero (dry); Pirelli Cinturato (wet)

Competition history
- Notable entrants: TGR Haas F1 Team
- Notable drivers: 31. (France) Esteban Ocon; 50. (Japan) Ryo Hirakawa; 87. (United Kingdom) Oliver Bearman; 51. (Brazil) Rafael Câmara
- Debut: 2026 Australian Grand Prix
- Last event: 2026 Las Vegas Grand Prix
Races	Wins	Podiums	Poles	F/Laps
21	0	0	0	0

The Haas VF-26 is a Formula One racing car designed and built by the Haas F1 Team to compete in the 2026 Formula One World Championship. It is currently being driven by Rafael Câmara, who made his debut for the team in Brazil, and Oliver Bearman, who is on his second season with the team.

The car was previously driven by Esteban Ocon, who was replaced after a breakdown in relations, and Ryo Hirakawa, who replaced Ocon at the Mexico City Grand Prix.

== Background ==
=== Development ===
The VF-26 was designed under the leadership of Technical Director Andrea De Zordo. Development began in the second half of 2024, with a full transition of resources occurring after the 2025 summer break. The VF-26 saw its first track running at the Barcelona shakedown test in January 2026.

=== Livery ===
The car was officially unveiled in a digital launch on 19 January 2026, sporting a new white and red livery that reflects the team's expanded title partnership with Toyota Gazoo Racing (TGR). Haas featured a Godzilla-themed livery for the Japanese and United States Grands Prix after the team signed a season-long collaboration deal with Toho. The latter grand prix's livery was used to promote Godzilla Minus Zero.

== Competition and development history ==
The VF-26 made its competitive debut at the 2026 Australian Grand Prix in Melbourne.

== Complete Formula One results ==
Key

Key
Colour	Result
Gold	Winner
Silver	Second place
Bronze	Third place
Green	Other points position
Blue	Other classified position
Blue	Not classified, finished (NC)
Purple	Not classified, retired (Ret)
Red	Did not qualify (DNQ)
Black	Disqualified (DSQ)
White	Did not start (DNS)
White	Race cancelled (C)
Blank	Did not practice (DNP)
Blank	Excluded (EX)
Blank	Did not arrive (DNA)
Blank	Withdrawn (WD)
Blank	Did not enter (empty cell)
Annotation	Meaning
P	Pole position
F	Fastest lap
Superscript number	Points-scoring position in sprint

Year	Entrant	Power unit	Tyres	Driver name	Grands Prix																							Points	WCC pos.
Year	Entrant	Power unit	Tyres	Driver name	AUS	CHN	JPN	MIA	CAN	MON	BCN	AUT	GBR	BEL	HUN	NED	ITA	ESP	AZE	BHR	SIN	USA	MXC	SAP	LVG	QAT	ABU	Points	WCC pos.
2026	Haas F1 Team	Ferrari 067/6	P	(France) Esteban Ocon	11	14	10	13	14	9	13	16	13	17	16	Ret	16	11	8	15	13	14	WD					31*	7th*
2026	Haas F1 Team	Ferrari 067/6	P	(United Kingdom) Oliver Bearman	7	5^{8}	Ret	11	10	Ret	17†	14	12	14	19	Ret	15	16	9	14	12^{6}	Ret	Ret	17	13			31*	7th*
2026	Haas F1 Team	Ferrari 067/6	P	(Japan) Ryo Hirakawa																			10					31*	7th*
2026	Haas F1 Team	Ferrari 067/6	P	(Brazil) Rafael Câmara																				20	16			31*	7th*

* Season still in progress.
