= 2025 Canadian Grand Prix =

Formula One motor race

Race 10 of 24 in the 2025 Formula One World Championship
← Previous race	Next race →
- Layout of the Circuit Gilles Villeneuve, Canada

Race details
- Date: 15 June 2025
- Official name: Formula 1 Pirelli Grand Prix du Canada 2025
- Location: Circuit Gilles Villeneuve, Montréal, Quebec, Canada
- Course: Semi-permanent racing facility
- Course length: 4.361 km (2.710 miles)
- Distance: 70 laps, 305.270 km (189.686 miles)
- Weather: Sunny
- Attendance: 352,000

Pole position
Driver	(United Kingdom) George Russell	Mercedes
- Time: 1:10.899

Fastest lap
Driver	(United Kingdom) George Russell	Mercedes
- Time: 1:14.119 on lap 63

Podium
First	(United Kingdom) George Russell	Mercedes
Second	(Netherlands) Max Verstappen	Red Bull Racing-Honda RBPT
Third	(Italy) Kimi Antonelli	Mercedes

The 2025 Canadian Grand Prix (officially known as the Formula 1 Pirelli Grand Prix du Canada 2025) was a Formula One motor race which was held on 15 June 2025 at the Circuit Gilles Villeneuve in Montreal, Quebec, Canada. It was the tenth round of the 2025 Formula One World Championship.

George Russell of Mercedes took pole position and victory for the event, ahead of Max Verstappen in the Red Bull in second and Russell's teammate Kimi Antonelli in third, the latter becoming the third-youngest driver to score a podium finish in Formula One. Championship rivals Oscar Piastri and Lando Norris collided in the closing stages leading to Norris's retirement from the race. Norris apologised and was penalised for the collision.

By finishing fourth, Piastri increased his championship lead to 22 points over Norris, with Verstappen a further 21 points behind in third. In the Constructors' Standings, the result moved Mercedes to second place with 199 points, 16 clear from Ferrari who dropped down to third.

== Background ==
The event was held at the Circuit Gilles Villeneuve on Île Notre-Dame in Montreal for the 44th time in the circuit's history, across the weekend of 13–15 June. The Grand Prix was the tenth round of the 2025 Formula One World Championship and the 54th running of the Canadian Grand Prix as a round of the Formula One World Championship.

=== Championship standings before the race ===
Going into the weekend, Oscar Piastri led the Drivers' Championship with 186 points, ten points ahead of his teammate Lando Norris in second, and 49 ahead of Max Verstappen in third. McLaren, with 362 points, led the Constructors' Championship from Mercedes and Red Bull Racing, who are second and third with 165 and 159 points, respectively.

=== Entrants ===
The drivers and teams were the same as published in the season entry list with two exceptions; Yuki Tsunoda at Red Bull Racing was in the seat originally held by Liam Lawson before the latter was demoted back to Racing Bulls from the Japanese Grand Prix onward, and Franco Colapinto replaced Jack Doohan at Alpine from the Emilia Romagna Grand Prix onward until at least the following Austrian Grand Prix on a rotating seat basis.

The event marked Tsunoda's 100th Grand Prix entry, and Haas and Alpine 200th and 100th Grand Prix appearance, respectively.

=== Tyre choices ===
Tyre supplier Pirelli brought the C4, C5, and C6 tyre compounds—the softest three in their range (designated hard, medium, and soft, respectively)—for teams to use at the event.

== Practice ==
Three free practice sessions were held for the event. The first free practice session was held on 13 June 2025, at 13:30 local time (UTC–4), and was topped by Max Verstappen of Red Bull Racing ahead of Alexander Albon of Williams and his teammate Carlos Sainz Jr. The session was red-flagged early on as Charles Leclerc of Ferrari crashed into the barriers at turn 3. The second free practice session was held on the same day, at 17:00 local time, and was topped by George Russell of Mercedes ahead of Lando Norris of McLaren and Russell's teammate Kimi Antonelli. Due to repairs to his car, Leclerc had to miss the second session.

The third free practice session was held on 14 June 2025, at 12:30 local time, and was topped by Norris ahead of Leclerc and Russell. The session was red-flagged for loose debris after Oscar Piastri in his McLaren hit the Wall of Champions at turn 13. He got a puncture and was able to make it back to the pit lane.

== Qualifying ==
Qualifying was held on 14 June 2025, at 16:00 local time (UTC–4), and determined the starting grid order for the race.

=== Qualifying classification ===
Pos.	No.	Driver	Constructor	Qualifying times			Final grid
Pos.	No.	Driver	Constructor	Q1	Q2	Q3	Final grid
1	63	(United Kingdom) George Russell	Mercedes	1:12.075	1:11.570	1:10.899	1
2	1	(Netherlands) Max Verstappen	Red Bull Racing-Honda RBPT	1:12.054	1:11.638	1:11.059	2
3	81	(Australia) Oscar Piastri	McLaren-Mercedes	1:11.939	1:11.715	1:11.120	3
4	12	(Italy) Kimi Antonelli	Mercedes	1:12.279	1:11.974	1:11.391	4
5	44	(United Kingdom) Lewis Hamilton	Ferrari	1:11.952	1:11.885	1:11.526	5
6	14	(Spain) Fernando Alonso	Aston Martin Aramco-Mercedes	1:12.073	1:11.805	1:11.586	6
7	4	(United Kingdom) Lando Norris	McLaren-Mercedes	1:11.826	1:11.599	1:11.625	7
8	16	(Monaco) Charles Leclerc	Ferrari	1:12.038	1:11.626	1:11.682	8
9	6	(France) Isack Hadjar	Racing Bulls-Honda RBPT	1:12.211	1:12.003	1:11.867	12^{1}
10	23	(Thailand) Alexander Albon	Williams-Mercedes	1:12.090	1:11.892	1:11.907	9
11	22	(Japan) Yuki Tsunoda	Red Bull Racing-Honda RBPT	1:12.334	1:12.102	N/A	18^{2}
12	43	(Argentina) Franco Colapinto	Alpine-Renault	1:12.234	1:12.142	N/A	10
13	27	(Germany) Nico Hülkenberg	Kick Sauber-Ferrari	1:12.323	1:12.183	N/A	11
14	87	(United Kingdom) Oliver Bearman	Haas-Ferrari	1:12.306	1:12.340	N/A	13
15	31	(France) Esteban Ocon	Haas-Ferrari	1:12.378	1:12.634	N/A	14
16	5	(Brazil) Gabriel Bortoleto	Kick Sauber-Ferrari	1:12.385	N/A	N/A	15
17	55	(Spain) Carlos Sainz Jr.	Williams-Mercedes	1:12.398	N/A	N/A	16
18	18	(Canada) Lance Stroll	Aston Martin Aramco-Mercedes	1:12.517	N/A	N/A	17
19	30	(New Zealand) Liam Lawson	Racing Bulls-Honda RBPT	1:12.525	N/A	N/A	PL^{3}
20	10	(France) Pierre Gasly	Alpine-Renault	1:12.667	N/A	N/A	PL^{3}
107% time: 1:16.853

Notes

- ^1 – Isack Hadjar received a three-place grid penalty for impeding Carlos Sainz Jr. during Q1.
- ^2 – Yuki Tsunoda received a ten-place grid penalty for overtaking Oscar Piastri under red flag conditions during the third free practice session.
- ^3 – Liam Lawson and Pierre Gasly qualified 19th and 20th, respectively, but they were required to start the race from the pit lane as their cars were modified under parc fermé conditions and additional power unit elements were used.

== Race ==
The race was held on 15 June 2025, at 14:00 local time (UTC–4), and was run for 70 laps.

=== Race report ===
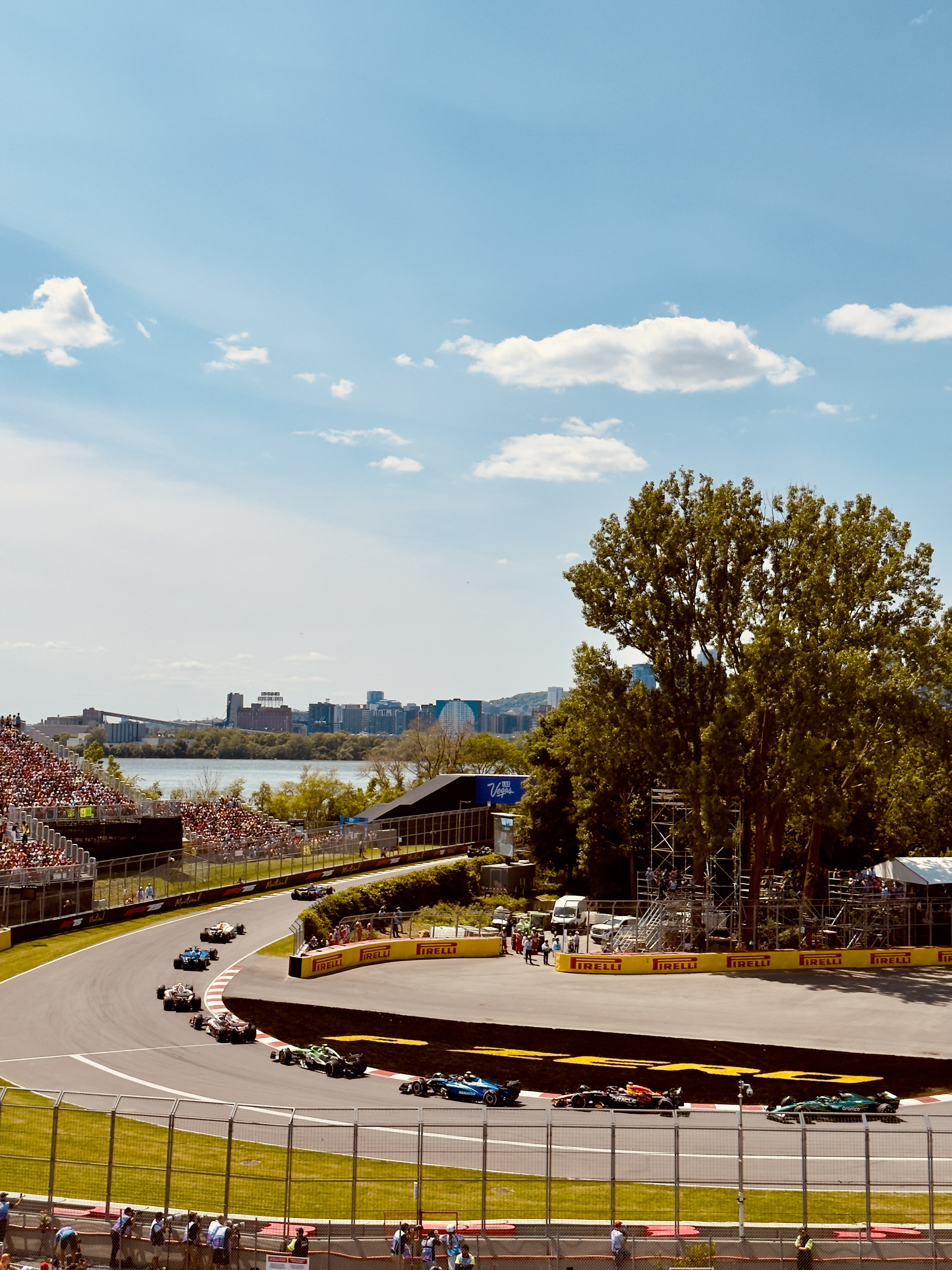
The opening lap of the 2025 Canadian Grand Prix

Polesitter George Russell of Mercedes comfortably held his position off the start, as did second-placed starting Max Verstappen of Red Bull. Third-placed Oscar Piastri of McLaren did not get as strong of a start, and was challenged by Russell's teammate Kimi Antonelli into the first corner. This forced Piastri to the outside of the Virage Senna hairpin, which compromised his exist and allowed Antonelli to pull alongside and then pass Piastri down the inside of turn 3. Further around the lap, Alexander Albon of Williams attempted to overtake Franco Colapinto of Alpine into turn 8 for the ninth position, but ran wide and onto the grass. As Albon rejoined the track, Colapinto was forced to slow down in avoidance. This allowed Nico Hülkenberg of Sauber to pass both cars, with Albon also losing out to Isack Hadjar of Racing Bulls.

The medium tyre was initially the fastest compound, however as the opening stint continued drivers running the hard tyre – the highest placed of which were Piastri's teammate Lando Norris in seventh and Charles Leclerc of Ferrari in eighth – began to make progress. On lap 11, Norris passed Fernando Alonso of Aston Martin exiting the L'Epingle hairpin to take sixth position. On lap 12 Verstappen became the first of the leading contenders to pit, doing so just as he was coming under pressure from Antonelli. To cover off the threat of an undercut, Russell pitted the following lap and was ultimately able to return not just ahead of Verstappen but also the yet-to-stop Hülkenberg, putting a car between him and his main rival for victory. Antonelli pitted the following lap, and emerged behind Verstappen. Norris and Leclerc, still yet to pit, therefore moved into first and second position – however they were quickly being caught by those of whom had already stopped. On lap 26, Russell passed Leclerc for second along the Casino Straight and both Leclerc and Norris pitted shortly after, with Leclerc taking hard tyres, and Norris mediums. The pair emerged in fifth and sixth ahead of Leclerc's teammate Lewis Hamilton, who had started ahead but lost ground due to being caught in traffic after his pit stop as well as suffering damage from running over a groundhog on the 13th lap.

On lap 37, Verstappen became the first leading driver to make this second pit stop, having once again come under threat from Antonelli. Antonelli pitted the following lap, emerging alongside Verstappen, falling behind due to the lowered speed that comes from exiting the pit lane. On lap 42, Russell pitted from the lead and emerged in fourth ahead of Verstappen. Following Piastri's pit stop on lap 45, Norris's on lap 46, and Leclerc's on lap 53, Russell retook the lead. A straight fight now began between the top 5 – whom were separated by about eight seconds – for the podium positions. Initially Piastri, seeking to take third, closed in on Antonelli but was unable to make a pass, leading to Piastri himself coming under pressure from his teammate Norris. On lap 66, Norris dived past Piastri entering L'Epingle, but ran wide on the corner's exit, allowing Piastri to pull back alongside as the teammates raced along the Casino Straight. Piastri retook the position down the inside of turn 13. Norris's line through the corner allowed him to get the better exit onto the start/finish straight. He attempted to move to the left of Piastri, giving him the inside line for turn 1, but misjudged. Norris's front wing clipped the back of Piastri's left-rear tyre and Norris hit the pit wall at high speed, breaking his front-left suspension.

The damage to Norris's car was terminal and the safety car was deployed to clear the McLaren. With insufficient time to clear the debris and resume the race, the Grand Prix finished under neutralised conditions. Russell therefore took his and Mercedes's first win of the season, and the fourth of his career. By crossing the line in third, Antonelli took his first podium finish in Formula One which, at the age of 18 years and 294 days, made him the third youngest podium finisher of all time behind Verstappen and Lance Stroll. Antonelli also became the first Italian driver to achieve a podium finish since Jarno Trulli finished second in the 2009 Japanese Grand Prix. Piastri extended his lead in the championship over second-placed Norris, and Mercedes overtook Ferrari for second in the Constructors' standings. There were three retirements: Liam Lawson, whose car overheated, Albon due to engine-related issues, and Norris due to his collision.

=== Post-race ===
Following the race, Norris admitted fault for the late-stage collision with Piastri. He received a five-second penalty for the collision, which did not affect his race as he had retired. The stewards stated in their verdict on the Norris–Piastri collision that Norris was given an in-race time penalty rather than grid penalty for the next race because Norris was classified as a race finisher in 18th place and four laps down on race winner Russell. (Note: Under the Formula One regulations, a driver is classified as a finisher if they have completed 90% of the race winners distance, even if they did not physically cross the finish line.) The stewards verdict also stated Norris was given lesser five-second time penalty rather than the standard ten-second penalty as the collision did not affect Piastri's result. Meanwhile, Red Bull lodged a protest against Russell for erratic driving during the safety car period, which was rejected by the stewards, and Hamilton, a well-known animal lover, felt devastated after he ran over a groundhog during the race, damaging his Ferrari's floor.

=== Race classification ===
Pos.	No.	Driver	Constructor	Laps	Time/Retired	Grid	Points
1	63	(United Kingdom) George Russell	Mercedes	70	1:31:52.688	1	25
2	1	(Netherlands) Max Verstappen	Red Bull Racing-Honda RBPT	70	+0.288	2	18
3	12	(Italy) Kimi Antonelli	Mercedes	70	+1.014	4	15
4	81	(Australia) Oscar Piastri	McLaren-Mercedes	70	+2.109	3	12
5	16	(Monaco) Charles Leclerc	Ferrari	70	+3.442	8	10
6	44	(United Kingdom) Lewis Hamilton	Ferrari	70	+10.713	5	8
7	14	(Spain) Fernando Alonso	Aston Martin Aramco-Mercedes	70	+10.972	6	6
8	27	(Germany) Nico Hülkenberg	Kick Sauber-Ferrari	70	+15.364	11	4
9	31	(France) Esteban Ocon	Haas-Ferrari	69	+1 lap	14	2
10	55	(Spain) Carlos Sainz Jr.	Williams-Mercedes	69	+1 lap	16	1
11	87	(United Kingdom) Oliver Bearman	Haas-Ferrari	69	+1 lap	13	
12	22	(Japan) Yuki Tsunoda	Red Bull Racing-Honda RBPT	69	+1 lap	18	
13	43	(Argentina) Franco Colapinto	Alpine-Renault	69	+1 lap	10	
14	5	(Brazil) Gabriel Bortoleto	Kick Sauber-Ferrari	69	+1 lap	15	
15	10	(France) Pierre Gasly	Alpine-Renault	69	+1 lap	PL	
16	6	(France) Isack Hadjar	Racing Bulls-Honda RBPT	69	+1 lap	12	
17	18	(Canada) Lance Stroll	Aston Martin Aramco-Mercedes	69	+1 lap	17	
18^{1}	4	(United Kingdom) Lando Norris	McLaren-Mercedes	66	Collision^{1}	7	
Ret	30	(New Zealand) Liam Lawson	Racing Bulls-Honda RBPT	53	Overheating	PL	
Ret	23	(Thailand) Alexander Albon	Williams-Mercedes	46	Engine	9	

Notes

- ^1 – Lando Norris was classified as he completed more than 90% of the race distance. He also received a five-second time penalty for causing a collision with Oscar Piastri. The penalty made no difference as he was classified in the last position.

== Championship standings after the race ==
Drivers' Championship standings

Pos.	Driver	Points
1	(Australia) Oscar Piastri	198
2	(United Kingdom) Lando Norris	176
3	(Netherlands) Max Verstappen	155
4	(United Kingdom) George Russell	136
5	(Monaco) Charles Leclerc	104

Constructors' Championship standings

	Pos.	Constructor	Points
	1	(United Kingdom) McLaren-Mercedes	374
1	2	(Germany) Mercedes	199
1	3	(Italy) Ferrari	183
	4	(Austria) Red Bull Racing-Honda RBPT	162
	5	(United Kingdom) Williams-Mercedes	55

- Note: Only the top five positions are included for both sets of standings.

== Notes ==
Previous race: 2025 Spanish Grand Prix	FIA Formula One World Championship; 2025 season	Next race: 2025 Austrian Grand Prix
Previous race: 2024 Canadian Grand Prix	Canadian Grand Prix	Next race: 2026 Canadian Grand Prix
