= Oliver Bearman =

British racing driver (born 2005)

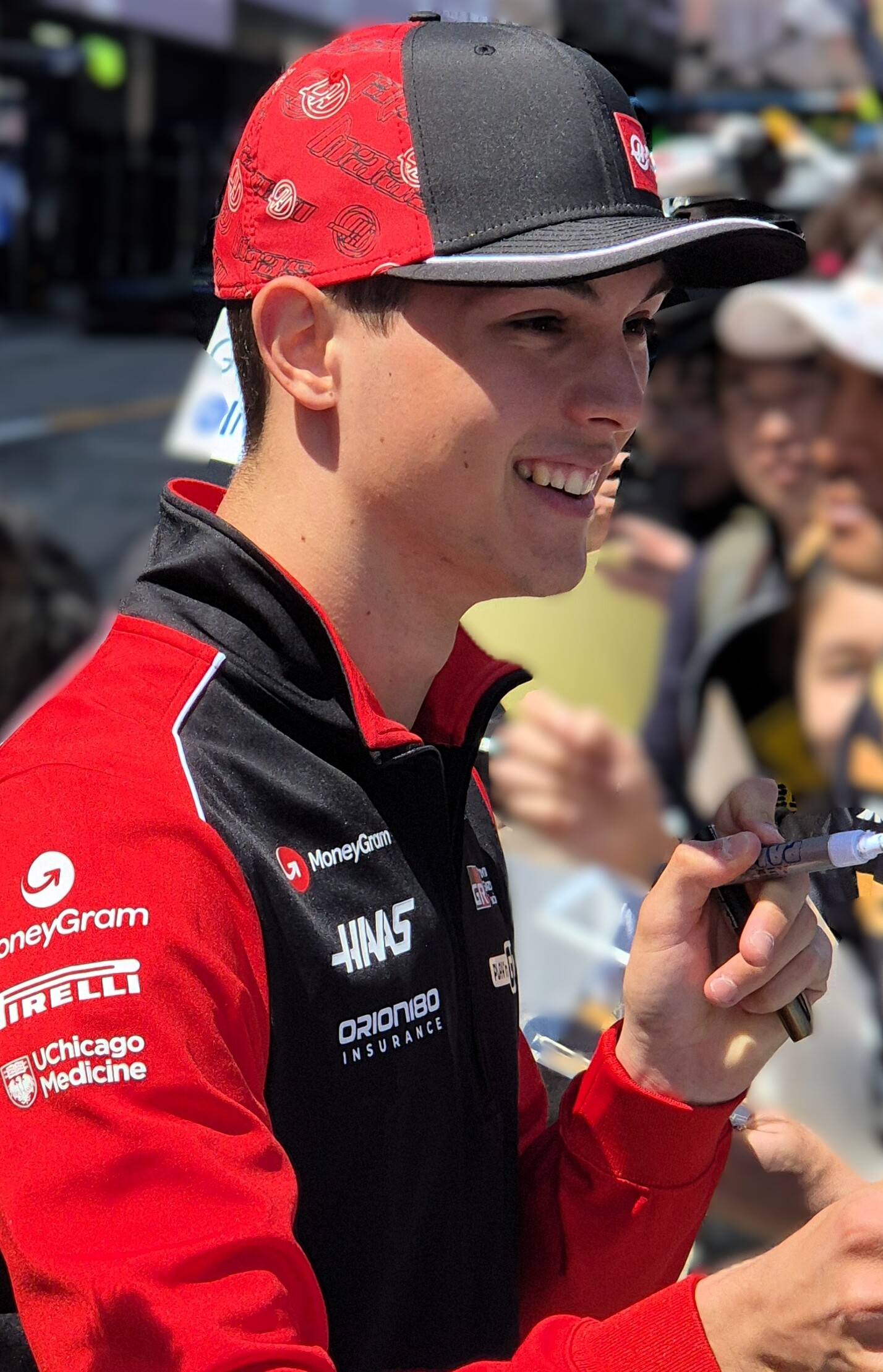
- Bearman in 2025
- Born: Oliver James Bearman; 8 May 2005 (age 21); Chelmsford, Essex, England
- Relatives: Thomas Bearman (brother)

Formula One World Championship career
- Nationality: (United Kingdom) British
- 2026 team: Haas-Ferrari
- Car number: 87 (Note: Bearman selected the number 87 as his personal driver number, per FIA regulations; in 2024, he competed using the standard reserve numbers 38 and 50 for Ferrari and Haas, respectively.)
- Entries: 48 (47 starts)
- Championships: 0
- Wins: 0
- Podiums: 0
- Career points: 71
- Pole positions: 0
- Fastest laps: 0
- First entry: 2024 Saudi Arabian Grand Prix
- Last entry: 2026 Las Vegas Grand Prix
- 2025 position: 13th (41 pts)

Previous series
- 2023–2024; 2022; 2022; 2021; 2020–2021; 2020–2021: FIA Formula 2; FIA Formula 3; FR Asian; GB3; Italian F4; ADAC F4

Championship titles
- 2021; 2021: Italian F4; ADAC F4

Awards
- 2021: Henry Surtees Award
- Website: www.olliebearman.com

Oliver James Bearman (/bɛərmən/; born 8 May 2005) is a British racing driver who competes in Formula One for Haas.

Born and raised in Chelmsford, Bearman began competitive kart racing aged seven, winning several national and continental titles. Graduating to junior formulae in 2020, Bearman won his first title at the 2021 Italian F4 Championship, also winning the ADAC F4 Championship that year, both with Van Amersfoort. He then competed in FIA Formula 3 in 2022, finishing third in his rookie season with Prema. Bearman progressed to FIA Formula 2 in 2023, finishing sixth that year and winning several races across two seasons.

A member of the Ferrari Driver Academy since 2022, Bearman was a reserve driver for both Ferrari and Haas in 2024, substituting for Carlos Sainz Jr. in Saudi Arabia—making his Formula One debut at the age of eighteen—and for Kevin Magnussen in Azerbaijan and São Paulo, becoming the youngest-ever driver to compete for Ferrari at the former. Bearman joined Haas as a full-time driver in 2025 alongside Esteban Ocon. Bearman is contracted to remain at Haas until at least the end of the 2026 season.

== Early and personal life ==
Oliver James Bearman was born on 8 May 2005 to David and Terri Bearman in Havering, London. He has a younger brother, Thomas Bearman (who is also a racing driver), and a sister. His father is the founder and chief executive officer of the insurance firm Aventum Group. Bearman grew up in Chelmsford, Essex, where he attended King Edward VI Grammar School. Bearman left school at the age of sixteen to join the Ferrari Driver Academy in Modena, Italy.

Bearman chose 87 as his permanent racing number for Formula One, as it was the number that he first used in kart racing.

== Junior racing career ==
=== Karting (2013–2020) ===
Bearman started karting competitively in 2013, when he raced in the championship of the Trent Valley Kart Club. He then moved to compete in the Super 1 National Championships, where he managed a best finish of second in 2016 and 2017, driving in the Cadet category. He then won the Kartmasters British Grand Prix in 2017, and he finished his karting career off strongly in 2019 with victory in the IAME International Final, IAME Euro Series and IAME Winter Cup. Bearman also won the IAME Winter Cup and the Euro Series in the X30 Senior Category during 2020.

=== Formula 4 (2020–2021) ===
==== 2020: Junior formulae debut ====
In 2020, Bearman made his single-seater debut in the ADAC Formula 4 Championship with US Racing, whilst also racing in three rounds of Italian F4. His campaign in the German series started off with regular points finishes in the first two rounds, before achieving his debut victory at the Hockenheimring. Bearman followed that up by scoring two further podiums, one at the Nürburgring and Oschersleben. Bearman finished seventh in the standings with 144 points, ahead of fellow rookie teammate Vladislav Lomko but behind top rookie and teammate Tim Tramnitz. In his appearances in the Italian Championship, Bearman scored a total of two podiums, with one of them being a race win in Vallelunga, leading to him finishing tenth in the end results.

==== 2021: Maiden championships ====
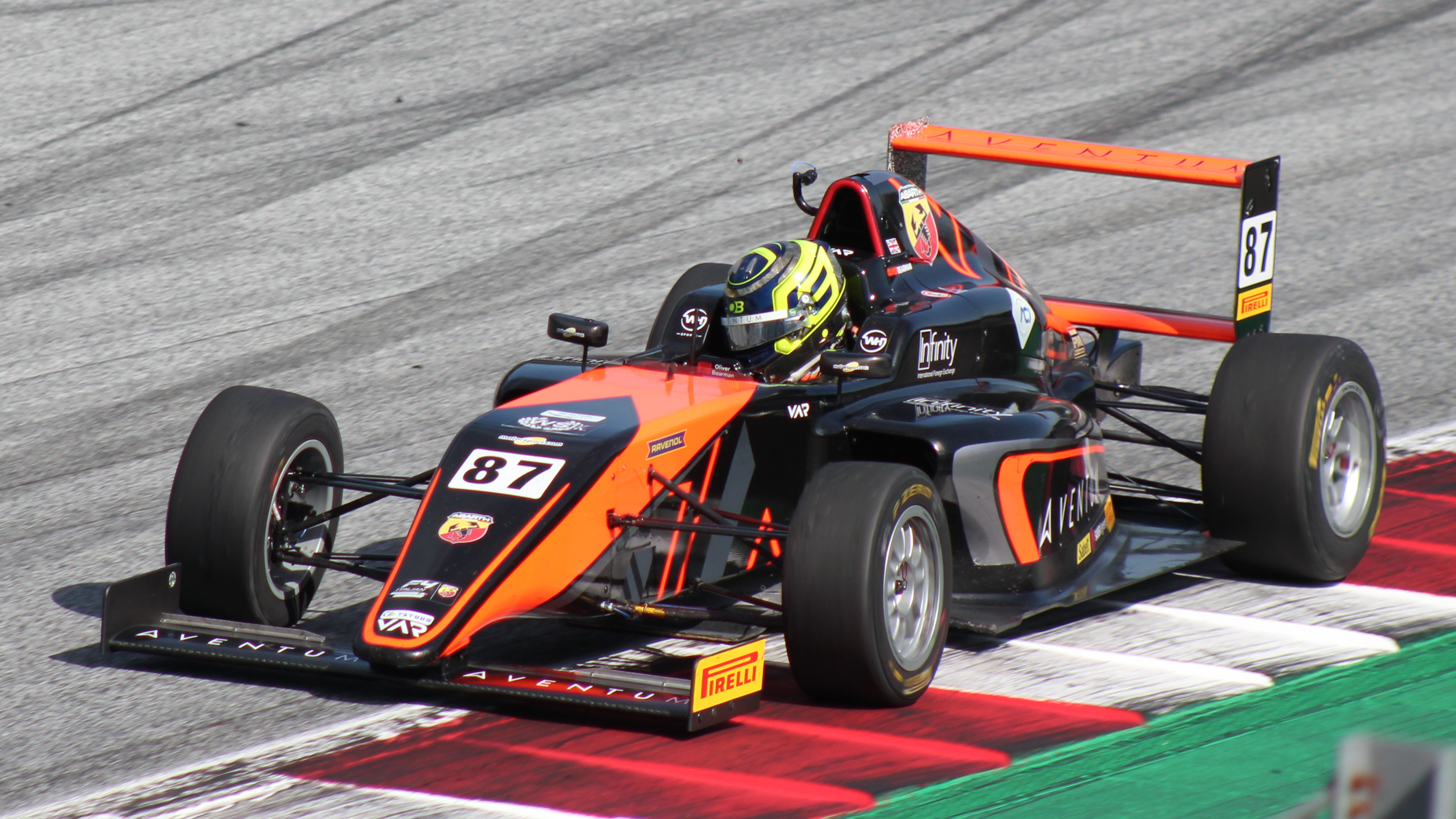
Bearman racing in the 2021 Italian F4 Championship

For the 2021 season, Bearman switched to Van Amersfoort Racing to perform double duties in both the German and Italian F4 Championships. In the Italian series, the Brit kicked off his season with a third place at the Circuit Paul Ricard. Following another podium in the same round, Bearman went on a podium and win streak, which lasted for nine and seven races respectively. This included two victories in Misano, a hat-trick of wins at the Vallelunga Circuit and two wins in Imola. However, a disqualification from the third Imola race for an engine irregularity meant that Bearman lost his streak, having originally won the race. Undeterred, Bearman achieved his eighth win of the season at the following race at the Red Bull Ring, and followed it up with another podium in the second race. In the penultimate round of the season in Mugello, despite not scoring any podiums, Bearman won the title with a tenth place in the third race, putting the championship out of reach for his closest rival Tim Tramnitz. He rounded out his campaign in perfect style, winning all three rounds during the season finale in Monza. Bearman had dominated the season with eleven wins, fifteen podiums and 343 points, 111 ahead of his nearest rival.

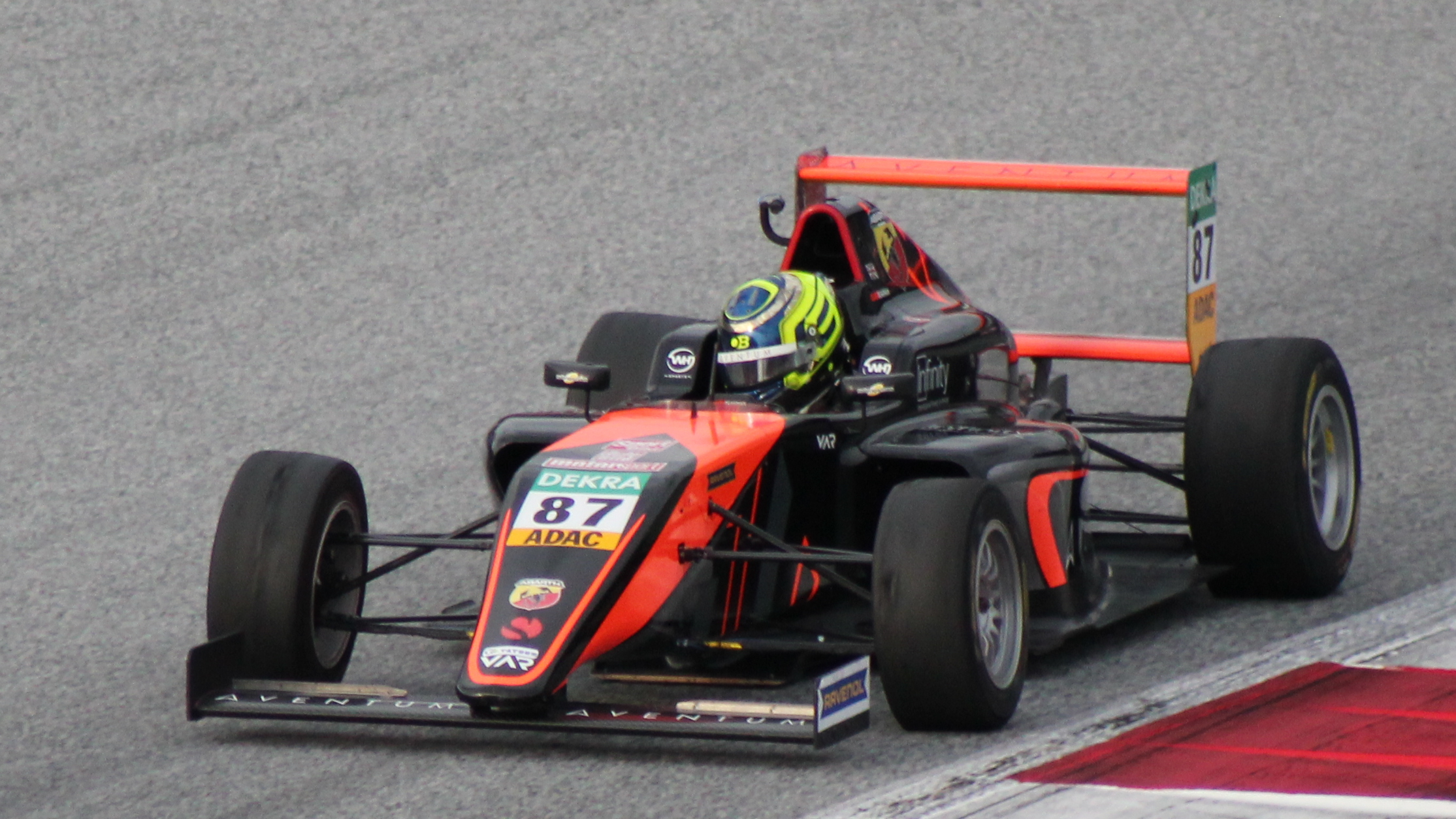
Bearman racing in the 2021 ADAC Formula 4 Championship

In the German championship, Bearman started the season with a double victory in the opening round at the Red Bull Ring, although a collision with Luke Browning on the opening lap in Race 3 prevented a clean sweep. He emulated his feat the next round in Zandvoort, securing another double victory. He took another win at Hockenheim, and despite four more podiums in the next two rounds, title rival Tramnitz closed the gap with three wins. In the Nürburgring finale, he won the second race, and a fourth place on Race 3 allowed Bearman to secure the ADAC F4 crown. It was another outstanding season for Bearman, taking six wins, eleven podiums and 295 points on route to becoming the first driver to win two successive Formula 4 titles in one year.

In September 2021, as a reward for his two F4 titles, Bearman was nominated for the Autosport BRDC Award. Additionally, in December 2021, Bearman was awarded the Henry Surtees Award for most outstanding performance by a BRDC rising star.

=== Formula Three (2021–2022) ===
==== 2021 ====
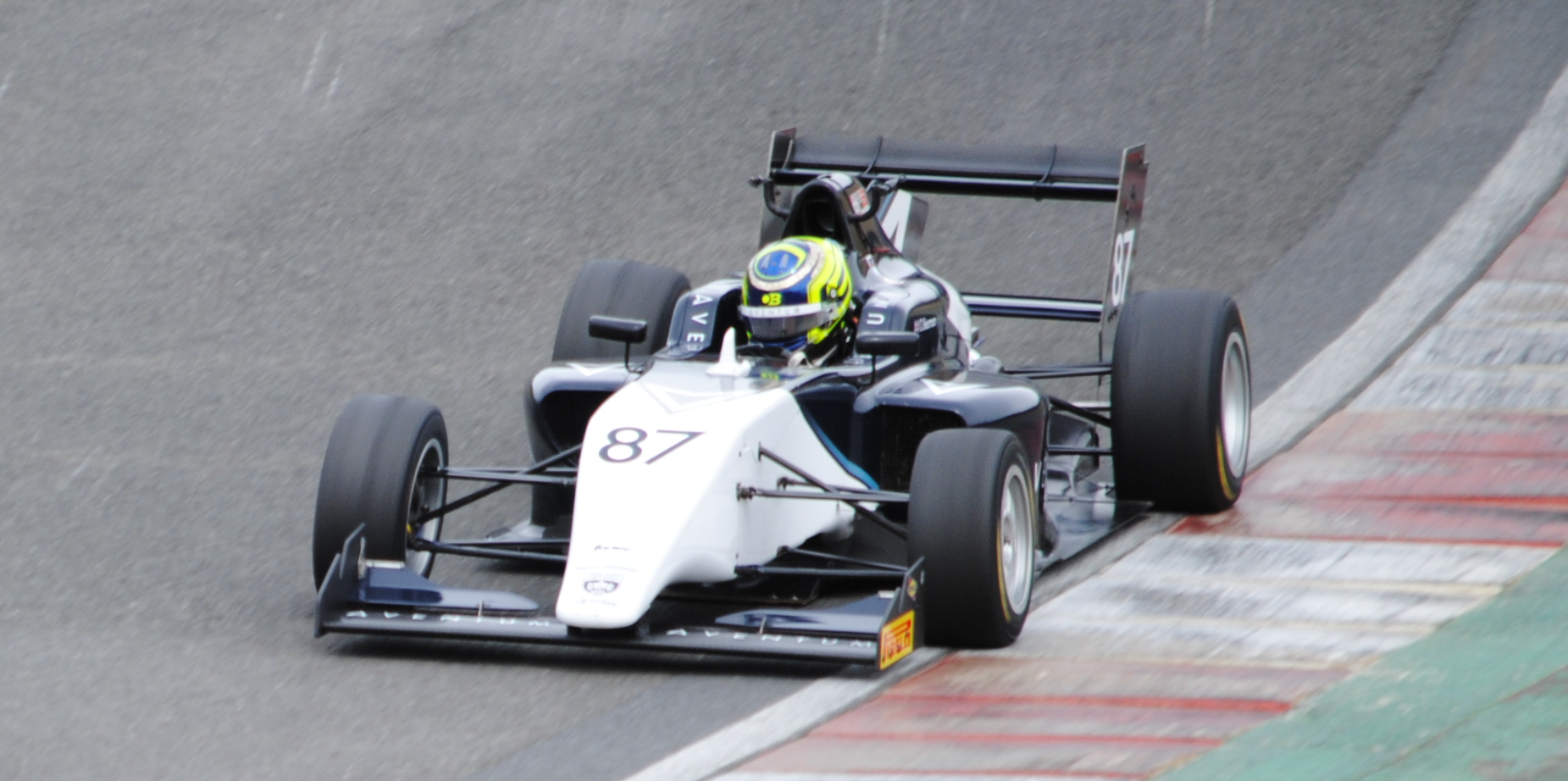
Bearman at Brands Hatch in 2021

Along with his duties in Formula 4, Bearman raced in the GB3 Championship with Fortec Motorsports, partnering Roberto Faria and Mikkel Grundtvig. He started his campaign off strongly, scoring two second-place finishes in the first two races at Brands Hatch. Having skipped the following three rounds in order to concentrate on his F4 campaign, Bearman came back at the Snetterton Circuit, where he won the opening race, and he followed that up by qualifying on pole for the first race at Silverstone. However, his chances of victory were slashed after losing his front left wheel on the second lap, which meant that a second place in Race 2 was the highest finish of his weekend. Bearman did not take part in any more rounds following that and he finished 14th in the standings, with 163 points.

==== 2022 ====
===== Formula Regional =====
In the winter of 2022, Bearman signed with Mumbai Falcons to partake in the final two rounds of the Formula Regional Asian Championship. His main highlight was a podium in only his second race at the Dubai Autodrome, and with two other points finishes, he placed 15th in the standings.

===== FIA Formula 3 =====
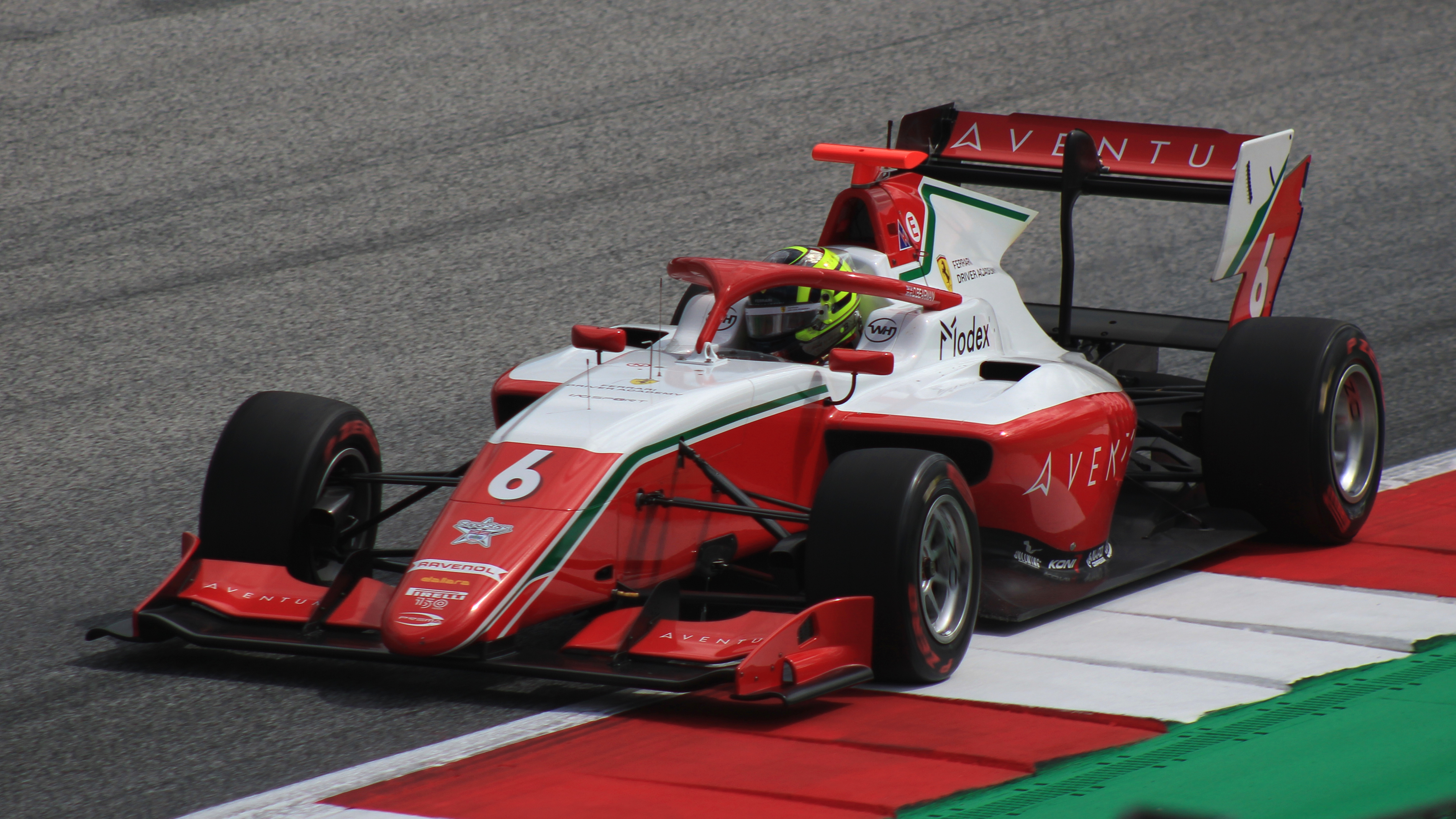
Bearman driving the Dallara F3 2019 during the 2022 Spielberg Formula 3 round

On 31 October 2021, Bearman was announced to be participating in the post-season test of the FIA Formula 3 Championship with Prema Racing, partnering Jak Crawford, Arthur Leclerc and Paul Aron. At the end of the year, Bearman was announced to be driving with Prema for the 2022 season alongside Crawford and Leclerc.

Bearman started his season by controlling the first race of the year in Bahrain, although, having crossed the finish line in first place, he was issued a penalty for multiple track limits breaches, which demoted him to second behind Isack Hadjar. He followed it up with a strong sixth place in the feature race. This was followed by a disappointing event at Imola; there, having been denied a points finish in the first race due to a spin that had come as a direct result of teammate Leclerc pushing him onto the grass, Bearman was battling to remain in third place near the end of Sunday's feature race. On the final lap, Bearman collided with Grégoire Saucy at the penultimate corner, which sent the Swiss driver out of the race and caused Bearman to be demoted from fourth to 17th post-race. The next round in Barcelona panned out more quietly, scoring a fifth place during the feature race.

Bearman gained form in the subsequent three rounds, starting from Silverstone, where from sixth, Bearman made a penultimate lap pass on Caio Collet for the rostrum places before battling his compatriot Zak O'Sullivan to the line for second; nevertheless it was Bearman's first feature race podium. Bearman then qualified third in Austria. He lost a few places after a slight contact with Zane Maloney mid-race, but eventually finished in sixth place, only to be dropped to 16th due to track limits. In a damp feature race, Bearman remained in his position to secure another third place podium. Bearman qualified third in Hungary for the second successive round. After finishing fifth in the sprint race, Bearman secured yet another third place during the feature race, as he narrowly missed out on pipping Maloney for second by 0.025s.

Following the summer break in Spa-Francorchamps, Bearman was able to fight his way to the front during the opening embers of the sprint race, having started from fifth, and took his first victory in the category despite a pair of safety cars and a Red flag interruption interfering with his race. The following day, Bearman once again finished third in the feature race, having overtaken Oliver Goethe on the final lap. Misfortune followed in Zandvoort, as a red flag hampered Bearman's qualifying efforts, leaving the Brit 14th on the grid. In the sprint race, Bearman moved up to tenth but made a mistake and lost the position to Roman Staněk, finishing in 11th. During the feature race, a penalty for a collision with O'Sullivan meant that Bearman lost his tenth place again, not adding points to his tally. Undeterred by his slim title chances going into the season finale at Monza, Bearman qualified in sixth. In the sprint race, Bearman finished second in the sprint race courtesy of a double-overtake on Jonny Edgar and Caio Collet into the first chicane, and even almost snatched the win from Franco Colapinto on the last lap. He continued his fight on Sunday, battling for the lead with Zane Maloney before a red flag ended the race prematurely, meaning Bearman finished the race in second place. With one win, eight podiums and 132 points, Bearman finished third in the standings, a mere seven points behind champion Victor Martins. Despite being regretful of "all the races where [he] needlessly lost points", the Briton maintained that he was happy to finish third in the championship.

=== FIA Formula 2 (2023–2024) ===
==== 2023 ====
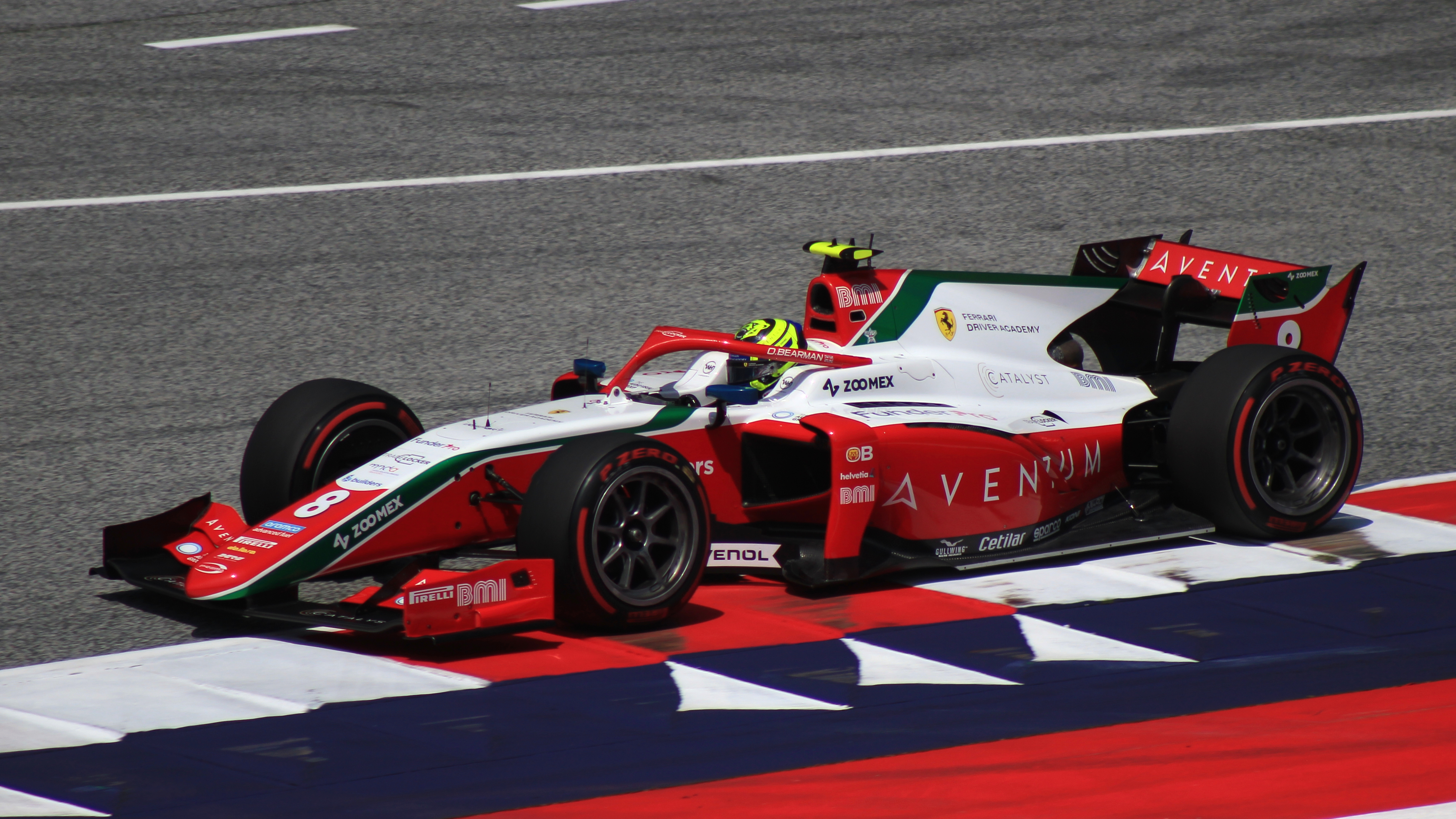
Bearman driving the Dallara F2 2018 during the 2023 Spielberg Formula 2 round

On 14 November 2022, Bearman was announced as a Prema Racing driver for the 2023 Formula 2 Championship, partnering Mercedes junior Frederik Vesti. Bearman started his season in Bahrain with 12th in qualifying, but could not salvage much in the sprint race, finishing P15. Taking advantage of lap 1 chaos in the feature race, Bearman rose to fourth early on. However, tyre degradation proved to be a factor as he was among the first to pit, and fell down the order late on for a disappointing 14th place. In Jeddah, the Briton broke his duck and qualified second having topped practice. However, his sprint race ended after Théo Pourchaire braked late and slammed into him, which ended both their races. In the feature race, Bearman battled with Victor Martins early on after seizing the lead at the start. However Bearman spun on his own later on, which dropped him down the order, and he subsequently lost more positions, ultimately finishing in tenth place.

Bearman ended sixth in qualifying at Melbourne, despite an early crash. In a sprint race where he battled many of his rivals, he secured seventh. However, in the feature race, Bearman's race came undone when he tangled with Isack Hadjar in the pits, sustaining a puncture. He had to pit again and had a trip to the gravel later on, finishing 17th. Bearman claimed his maiden pole position the next round in Baku in dramatic circumstances, managing to set the fastest lap despite a shunt just minutes before the end of the session which resulted in his steering wheel pointing slightly to the right. Starting the race ninth after a grid penalty for Pourchaire, Bearman came through the field to move up to fourth by lap 1. In the closing stages, leaders Dennis Hauger, Victor Martins and Jehan Daruvala crashed out in turn 1 following a late safety car restart. After navigating around the pileup, Bearman capitalised on a mistake by teammate Vesti to take the lead before the race was neutralised once more, becoming the second youngest race winner in Formula 2. The following day, the feature race, Bearman claimed victory and became the ninth driver in GP2 and Formula 2 history to do "the double" and only the fourth as a rookie.

The next round in Monaco proved to be disappointing as Bearman retired on lap 23 of the sprint race due to a suspension problem; in the feature race he finished just outside the points owing to a poor qualifying in 11th. Despite that, he retained his good form by scoring his second pole in Barcelona. A good start in a wet sprint race meant Bearman finished in seventh place. In the feature race, he fended off Enzo Fittipaldi at the start, and from there, he controlled the race to secure his third win. He qualified a disappointing 19th for the Austria. In the sprint race, despite pitting for sluck tyres, Bearman was able to finish in eighth and score a point after a comeback. A timely pit stop during the safety car allowed Bearman to make up a heap of places, and he eventually improved to fifth place after numerous overtakes on fresh tyres. In Silverstone, Bearman qualified fifth and moved up to second briefly in the sprint. However, his race slowly unravelled as he spun, dropping him to sixth after a mistake into the gravel trap amidst a battle with Jack Doohan. A strong start saw him up to third, but contact later on with Kush Maini meant Bearman was given a five-second penalty, demoting him from sixth to eighth in the feature race.

Bearman qualified seventh in Hungary. Bearman finished in third place after a late lunge on Pourchaire in the dying laps meant he moved up to the rostrum places. However, he lacked pace in the feature race, as he faded down to 13th place. Bearman secure his third pole of the season in Spa-Francorchamps. In the feature race, he lost the lead in the pit stops to Pourchaire, and he eventually finished in fourth at the chequered flag, but contact with Victor Martins earned Bearman a penalty which dropped him to seventh place. Starting sixth for the feature race in Zandvoort, Bearman spun at the start after being hit by Juan Manuel Correa but he made his way back up the order, only for his race to end prematurely due to a collision with Martins, which broke Bearman's suspension. Bearman proceeded to qualify on the front row Monza. Despite being shuffled outside the top 10 during the sprint race start, Bearman was able to gain place and finish in sixth position. In the feature race, Bearman managed to pass polesitter Pourchaire at the start, and from there, he controlled the race for his fourth win, placing him within one point of Martins for fifth in the standings.

He qualified in a disappointing 17th for the Abu Dhabi season finale. He finished the sprint in tenth, but an engine failure on lap 20 curtailed his race prematurely. Despite this, Bearman ended his season sixth in the drivers' championship with 130 points, securing four wins, five podiums, two pole positions and two fastest laps. He also helped Prema secure second in the teams' championship.

==== 2024 ====
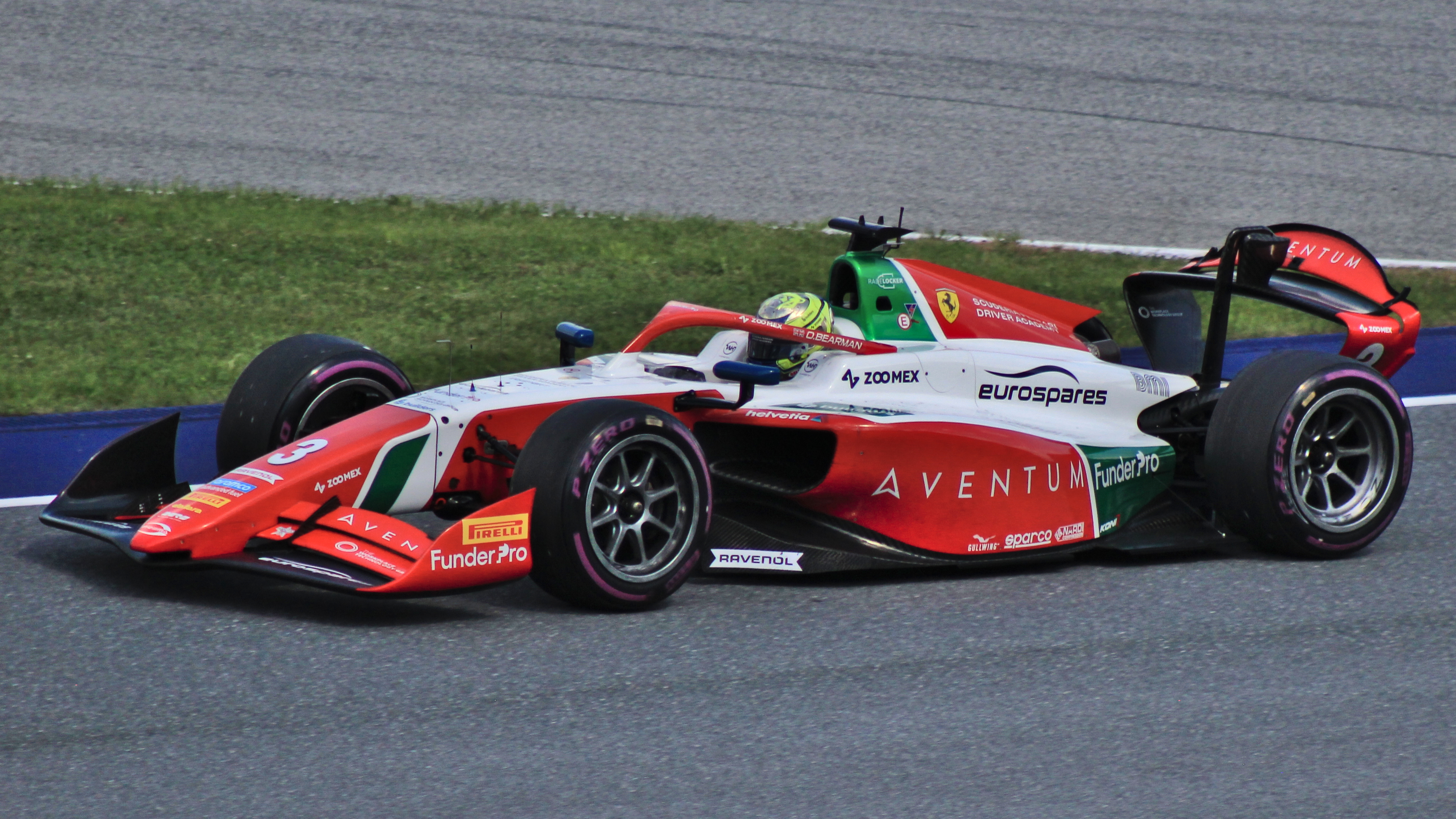
Bearman driving for Prema Racing during the 2024 Spielberg Formula 2 round

Bearman remained with Prema Racing for the 2024 season, paired up with Mercedes junior and 2023 FRECA champion Andrea Kimi Antonelli. Prema struggled to adapt to the new regulations at the start of the season, as Bearman came away without points in the Bahrain opener owing to qualifying down in 18th. Despite his struggles, Bearman qualified on pole for the next round in Jeddah. However, he withdrew from the event to replace Carlos Sainz at Ferrari for the Saudi Arabian Grand Prix. Bearman returned in Melbourne, but a technical issue in qualifying limited him to only 16th. He was set to score his first points in the sprint race with eighth, but received a penalty for forcing Joshua Dürksen wide, dropping him to 14th. In the feature race, despite being held in a double stack pit stop under the safety car, Bearman finished ninth, scoring his first points. Bearman then qualified second at Imola, finishing the sprint in fifth place as he took advantage of a first lap multi-car accident to move up the order. During the feature race, Bearman took the lead on the opening lap but stalled during his mandatory pit stop, condemning him to 19th at the chequered flag.

Bearman qualified 15th in Monte Carlo. In the feature race, a bold strategy call for an early stop meant Bearman finished fourth, his best finish of the season at that point. A torrid weekend followed in Barcelona, where finished the sprint 21st due to track limits penalties, and finished the feature race 14th, where Valentin Khorounzhiy of The Race described his weekend as "truly turgid, amid balance struggles manifesting what the team described as strong understeer - which then also seemingly translated into the tyres getting absolutely shredded over longer runs". Bearman finally broke his duck in Austria by winning the sprint race from second, where he held off Pepe Martí for his first victory. Speaking about his win, Bearman admitted it was "painful" to not be fighting for the championship. His feature race however, was a complete contrast, as he retired on lap 21 with an engine issue. Bearman qualified fifth for Silverstone. In the sprint race, he damaged his front wing on the opening lap following contact with Gabriel Bortoleto, before retiring on lap 15 from another engine issue. In the feature race, he briefly moved to second after a good start, but eventually fell to seventh.

Bearman failed to score points in Hungary once again after a poor qualifying. More woes followed for Bearman in Spa-Francorchamps, as during the feature race, Bearman crashed out on the opening lap after a collision with Zane Maloney and Martí, and he was given a five-place grid drop for the next round. In Monza, Bearman won the sprint race from eighth on the grid as he slowly made his way up the order for a second triumph. After improving to second at the start of the feature race, he duelled with teammate Antonelli and eventually finished seventh, his first double points finish of the season. Bearman missed the next round in Baku to replace a banned Kevin Magnussen at Haas for the Azerbaijan Grand Prix.

Bearman qualified on reverse pole in Qatar. Despite being passed by Isack Hadjar early in the sprint race, Bearman eventually re-passed him to secure his third win of the year. The feature race did not go as planned as an early safety car dashed Bearman's hopes on the alternate strategy, and he eventually placed down in 12th place. He qualified 15th for the season finale in Abu Dhabi. Bearman made good comebacks during the races, finishing in fourth during the sprint and fifth in the feature. Bearman finished his season a disappointing 12th in the driver's standings with 75 points despite being considered as a title favourite going into the season. On his season, Bearman said, "It was tough to not be fighting for wins regularly, but I will have seasons like this in my career and it has been a great learning experience." During the season, he took three wins and one fastest lap.

== Formula One career ==
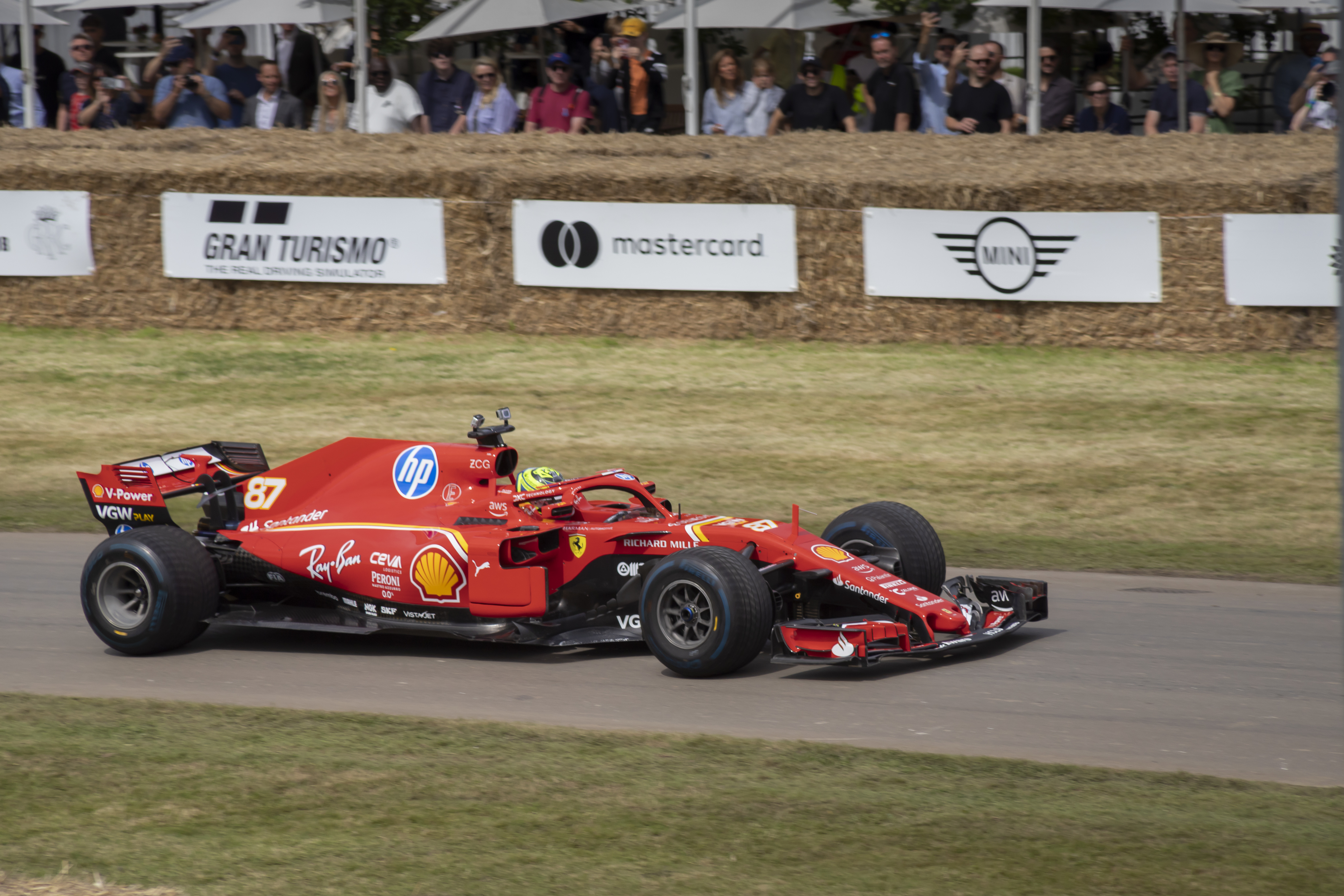
Bearman demonstrating the Ferrari SF71H at the Goodwood Festival of Speed in 2024

In October 2021, Bearman was named as one of the finalists of the Ferrari Driver Academy's Scouting World Final. The following month, Bearman was confirmed to be joining the academy along with karting champion Rafael Câmara.

In October 2023, Bearman made his first test in a Formula One car during a private session at Fiorano with Ferrari. He made his free practice debut at the 2023 Mexico City Grand Prix with Haas F1 Team. He finished 15th, and was only three tenths off Haas driver Nico Hülkenberg. Haas stated they were "very impressed" with his performance. He took part in his second free practice at the Abu Dhabi Grand Prix. Bearman then drove the VF-23 in the young drivers' test.

On 27 January 2024, Bearman was announced as Ferrari's reserve driver for the 2024 season, sharing the role with Robert Shwartzman and Antonio Giovinazzi. He was also later confirmed as a reserve driver for Haas, and drove the Haas VF-24 during first practice at the Emilia Romagna Grand Prix in place of Kevin Magnussen. He drove the VF-24 again during the Pirelli tyre test at Silverstone. Bearman drove the Ferrari SF-24 during first practice at the Mexico City Grand Prix, but his running ended prematurely following a collision with Alex Albon.

=== Ferrari/Haas reserve driver (2024) ===
Bearman made his Formula One debut at the 2024 Saudi Arabian Grand Prix, replacing Carlos Sainz Jr. after he withdrew from the event with appendicitis following the second free practice session, becoming the youngest-ever driver to compete for Ferrari. Bearman qualified eleventh, missing out on Q3 by 36 hundredths. In the race, Bearman was able to hold off Lando Norris and Lewis Hamilton in the closing stages of the race to secure seventh place and his maiden points finish; he became the then-youngest driver to score points on debut in Formula One. Additionally, he was voted Driver of the Day by the fans and received widespread acclaim from drivers and critics for his performance on short notice. Teammate Charles Leclerc also stated that it was "a matter of time before we see [him] permanently in the Formula 1 paddock". Bearman was put on standby for the Australian Grand Prix, but ultimately Sainz was fit enough to drive.

Between Saudi Arabia and Azerbaijan, Bearman took part in four practice sessions for Haas as a young/reserve driver.

In July, Haas announced that Bearman had signed a multi-year contract with the team from 2025 onwards, following months of speculation. Bearman made an early debut for Haas at the Azerbaijan Grand Prix, after Kevin Magnussen received a race ban. He narrowly missed out on a Q3 appearance once again, as he qualified eleventh but ahead of teammate Nico Hülkenberg. In the race, Bearman finished tenth, beating Hülkenberg in both sessions to score another points finish and become the first driver in history to score points for two different teams in his first two races. Bearman again deputised for Magnussen at the São Paulo Grand Prix, after Magnussen withdrew due to illness. He beat Hülkenberg in both sprint sessions, where he qualified tenth and finished fourteenth. Bearman was involved in several incidents in the wet-weather conditions during the Grand Prix—including a 10-second time penalty for causing a collision with Franco Colapinto and a high speed spin, he qualified sixteenth and finished twelfth.

=== Haas (2025–present) ===
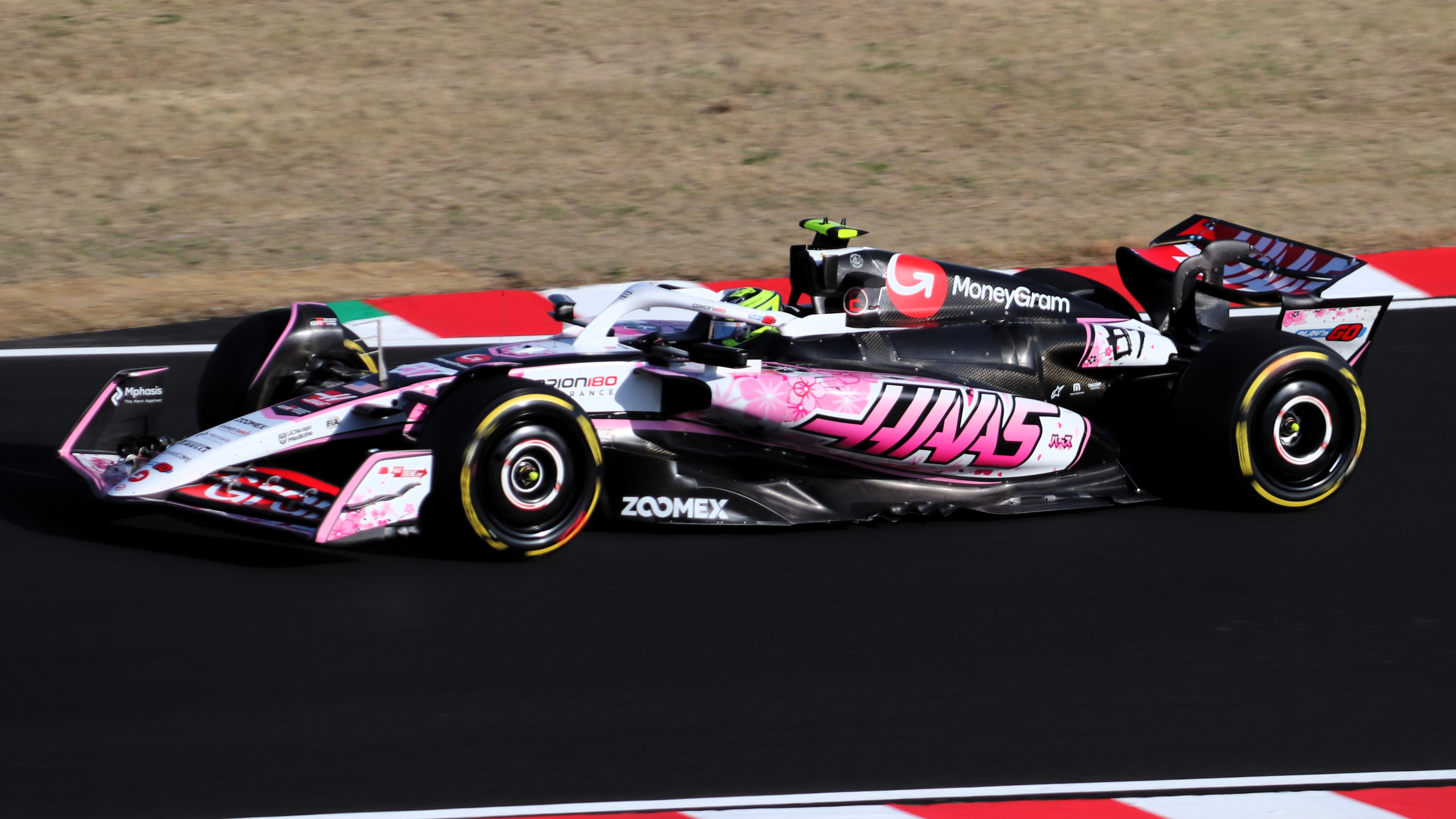
Bearman (pictured at the Japanese Grand Prix) signed for Haas as a full-time driver in 2025.

==== 2025: Rookie season ====
Bearman was partnered with former Alpine driver Esteban Ocon for 2025. At the season-opening Australian Grand Prix, he crashed out of both free practice sessions he entered—missing the second session due to collision damage—and was unable to qualify after a gearbox issue; after being permitted to start by the FIA, he placed last of the finishers in fourteenth. He finished eighth at the Chinese Grand Prix after disqualifications for both Ferrari drivers, achieving his first points finish in the VF-25. He scored further points with tenth-placed finishes in Japan and Bahrain, having qualified last at the latter. He claimed thirteenth at the Saudi Arabian Grand Prix. He climbed from nineteenth to eighth in the rain-affected Miami Grand Prix sprint, demoted to fourteenth following a penalty for an unsafe pit release; he suffered an engine failure whilst running in twelfth in the main race. He finished seventeenth in Emilia Romagna, twelfth in Monaco, and seventeenth again in Spain; he narrowly missed out on setting a qualifying lap at the former, was penalised for a red flag infringement in Monaco, and again for an incident with Liam Lawson at the latter. Bearman claimed eleventh in the following four Grands Prix—Canada, Austria, Britain, and Belgium; at his first British Grand Prix, he received a ten-place grid penalty for crashing in the pit lane under red flag conditions, and claimed points with seventh in the Belgium sprint. He retired from the Hungarian Grand Prix with spontaneous floor damage. After driving from the pit lane to sixth at the Dutch Grand Prix, Bearman hit Carlos Sainz Jr. at the Italian Grand Prix and received a ten-second penalty and two further penalty points; classified twelfth, having incurred ten penalty points, he would be two points away from being awarded a race ban. (Note: A driver needs to have reached the twelve penalty point threshold to be banned. The last driver to have done so is Kevin Magnussen. Bearman previously substituted for Magnussen at the 2024 Azerbaijan Grand Prix.) After finishing twelfth again at the Azerbaijan Grand Prix, Bearman scored back-to-back ninth places in Singapore and the United States. He was running seventh in the United States Grand Prix before a collision with Yuki Tsunoda. He finished fourth at the Mexico City Grand Prix—the joint-highest finish by a Haas driver since their debut in 2016—after climbing from ninth in the opening laps and holding off front-runners Kimi Antonelli, George Russell, and Oscar Piastri. After a collision with Liam Lawson in the São Paulo sprint, Bearman secured a fourth consecutive Q3 entry and finished sixth in the race. His points finish in Brazil was his fourth consecutive points-scoring result, setting a new record for any Haas driver. Bearman extended his record by finishing tenth at Las Vegas, following the disqualification of both McLaren drivers. In Qatar, Bearman qualified thirteenth and retired from the race after a penalty from an unsafe release and subsequent retirement to "save the engine". During the final round in Abu Dhabi, Bearman initially finished tenth, in the points, however was handed a five-second time penalty for changing direction more than once in a battle with Lance Stroll as Haas finished eighth in the Constructors' Championship.

==== 2026 ====
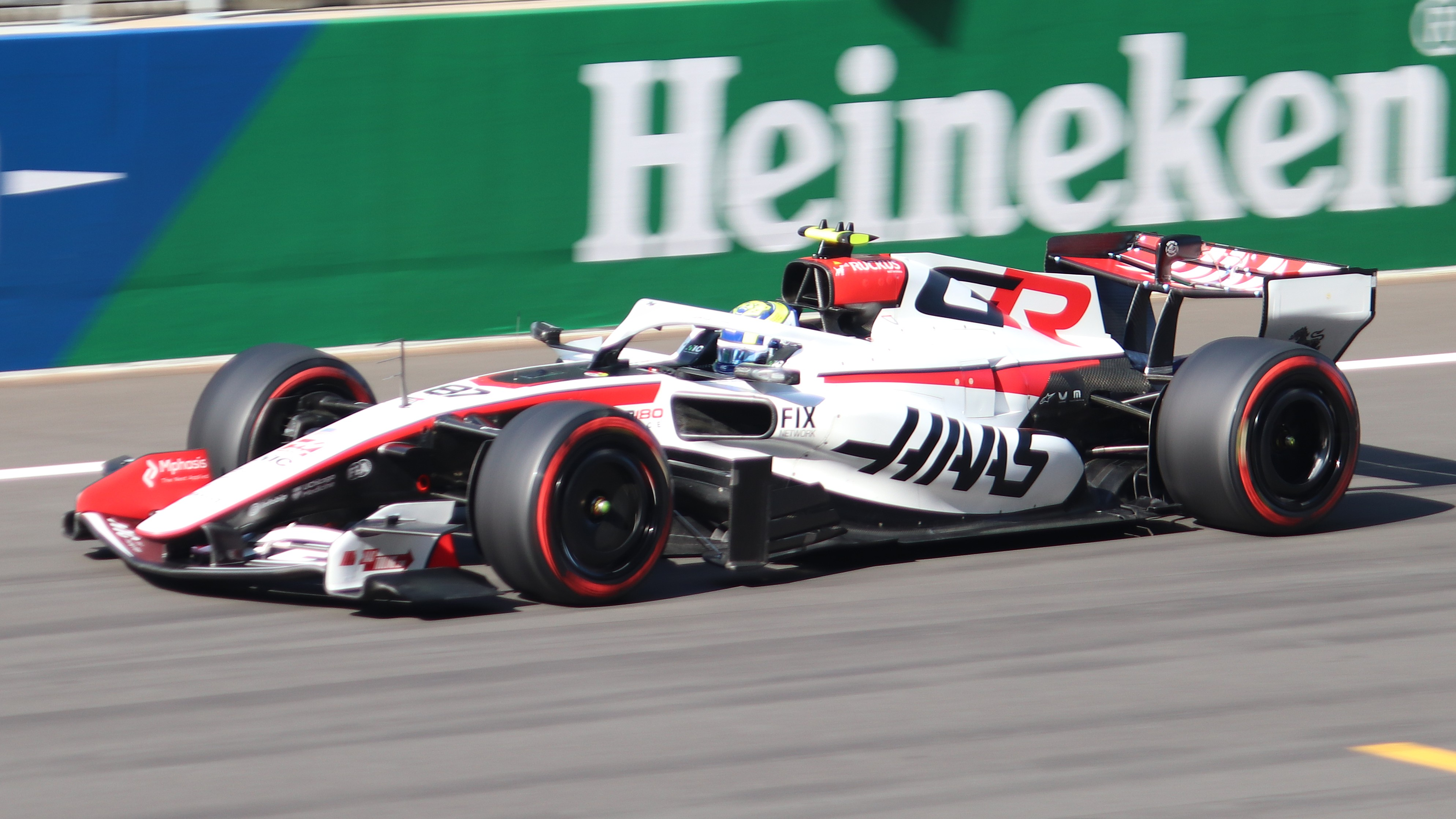
Bearman driving the VF-26 at the Chinese Grand Prix

Bearman remained at Haas for the 2026 season alongside Esteban Ocon. He began the 2026 campaign strongly at the Australian Grand Prix, finishing seventh to secure six points. At the Chinese Grand Prix, he qualified ninth for the sprint race and finished eighth to score a single point. In the main Grand Prix, despite a "deer in the headlights" moment on the opening lap where he narrowly avoided a spinning Isack Hadjar, Bearman recovered to finish in fifth place. He did not finish at the Japanese Grand Prix as he crashed on the twenty-second lap of the race. Following an eleventh place finish in Miami, he scored a point again with a tenth place finish at the Canadian Grand Prix. This was followed by a retirement on the thirtieth lap of the Monaco Grand Prix due to damage to his car, and a power-related retirement on the sixty-third lap of the Barcelona-Catalunya Grand Prix. Subsequently, he finished fourteenth in Austria, twelfth in Silverstone, and fourteenth again in Belgium. Bearman finished nineteenth at the Hungarian Grand Prix, having incurred a five-second time penalty for ignoring blue flags.

== Other racing ==
In December 2024, Bearman took part in a Super Formula test at the Suzuka Circuit. He finished third in the morning session, but engine trouble hindered his progress in the afternoon session, which he described as "a bit sad".

In July 2025, Bearman set a new track record at a karting track in Varberg, Sweden, which has since been reclaimed by the previous holder Elton Zevenwacht.

== Karting record ==
=== Karting career summary ===
Season	Series	Team	Position
2013	Trent Valley Kart Club — Honda Cadet	Evolution Racing	49th
2014	Super 1 National Championships — Honda Cadet	Evolution Racing	13th
2014	Kartmasters British Grand Prix — Honda Cadet	Evolution Racing	4th
2015	Super 1 National Championships — Honda Cadet	Evolution Racing	4th
2015	Kartmasters British Grand Prix — Honda Cadet	Evolution Racing	10th
2015	Formula Kart Stars — Cadet	Evolution Racing	11th
2016	Super 1 National Championships — Honda Cadet	Virtus Motorsport	2nd
2016	ABkC British Open Championship — Honda Cadet	Virtus Motorsport	5th
2016	Kartmasters British Grand Prix — Honda Cadet	Virtus Motorsport	2nd
2017	Super 1 National Championships — Honda Cadet	Virtus Motorsport	2nd
2017	Kartmasters British Grand Prix — Honda Cadet	Virtus Motorsport	1st
2018	IAME Winter Cup — X30 Junior	Strawberry Racing	5th
2019	Kartmasters British Grand Prix — X30 Junior	KR Sport	4th
2019	Kartmasters British Grand Prix — Rotax Junior	KR Sport	2nd
2019	IAME Winter Cup — X30 Junior	KR Sport	1st
2019	British Championships — X30 Junior	KR Sport	27th
2019	IAME Euro Series — X30 Junior	KR Sport	1st
2019	IAME International Final — X30 Junior	KR Sport	1st
2020	IAME Winter Cup — X30 Senior	KR Sport	1st
2020	IAME Euro Series — X30 Senior	KR Sport	59th

== Racing record ==
=== Racing career summary ===
Season	Series	Team	Races	Wins	Poles	F/Laps	Podiums	Points	Position
2020	ADAC Formula 4 Championship	US Racing	21	1	0	1	3	144	7th
2020	Italian F4 Championship	US Racing	8	1	0	1	2	85	10th
2021	ADAC Formula 4 Championship	Van Amersfoort Racing	18	6	5	4	11	295	**1st**
2021	Italian F4 Championship	Van Amersfoort Racing	21	11	8	2	15	343	**1st**
2021	GB3 Championship	Fortec Motorsports	9	1	2	1	4	163	14th
2022	Formula Regional Asian Championship	Mumbai Falcons India Racing	6	0	0	0	1	29	15th
2022	FIA Formula 3 Championship	Prema Racing	18	1	0	1	8	132	**3rd**
2023	FIA Formula 2 Championship	Prema Racing	26	4	3	2	5	130	6th
2023	Formula One	Haas F1 Team	Test driver						
2024	FIA Formula 2 Championship	Prema Racing	24	3	0	0	3	75	12th
2024	Formula One	Scuderia Ferrari	1	0	0	0	0	7	18th
2024	Formula One	MoneyGram Haas F1 Team	2	0	0	0	0	7	18th
2025	Formula One	MoneyGram Haas F1 Team	24	0	0	0	0	41	13th
2026	Formula One	TGR Haas F1 Team	21	0	0	0	0	23*	13th*

* Season still in progress.

=== Complete ADAC Formula 4 Championship results ===
(key) (Races in bold indicate pole position) (Races in italics indicate fastest lap)

Year	Team	1	2	3	4	5	6	7	8	9	10	11	12	13	14	15	16	17	18	19	20	21	Pos	Points
2020	US Racing	LAU1; 1; 10	LAU1; 2; 7	LAU1; 3; 6	NÜR1; 1; 13	NÜR1; 2; 7	NÜR1; 3; 10	HOC; 1 Ret	HOC; 2; 1	HOC; 3; 8	NÜR2; 1; 6	NÜR2; 2; 3	NÜR2; 3; 4	RBR; 1; 6	RBR; 2; 10	RBR; 3; 8	LAU2; 1; 5	LAU2; 2; 6	LAU2; 3 Ret	OSC; 1; 7	OSC; 2; 3	OSC; 3; 7	7th	144
2021	Van Amersfoort Racing	**RBR**; **1**; 1	RBR; 2; 1	RBR; 3 Ret	**ZAN**; **1**; 1	**ZAN**; **2**; 1	ZAN; 3; 4	**HOC1**; **1**; 1	HOC1; 2; 4	HOC1; 3; 2	SAC; 1; 2	SAC; 2; 4	SAC; 3; 2	HOC2; 1; 6	HOC2; 2; 2	HOC2; 3; 3	NÜR; 1; 5	**NÜR**; **2**; 1	NÜR; 3; 4				1st	295

=== Complete Italian F4 Championship results ===
(key) (Races in bold indicate pole position) (Races in italics indicate fastest lap)

Year	Team	1	2	3	4	5	6	7	8	9	10	11	12	13	14	15	16	17	18	19	20	21	Pos	Points
2020	US Racing	MIS; 1	MIS; 2	MIS; 3	IMO1; 1	IMO1; 2	IMO1; 3	RBR; 1; 5	RBR; 2; 2	RBR; 3; 5	MUG; 1	MUG; 2	MUG; 3	MNZ; 1	MNZ; 2	MNZ; 3	IMO2; 1; 7	IMO2; 2; 6	IMO2; 3; 12	VLL; 1; 1	VLL; 2 C	VLL; 3; 6	10th	85
2021	Van Amersfoort Racing	LEC; 1; 3	**LEC**; **2**; 7	LEC; 3; 2	MIS; 1; 2	**MIS**; **2**; 1	**MIS**; **3**; 1	**VLL**; **1**; 1	VLL; 2; 1	**VLL**; **3**; 1	**IMO**; **1**; 1	**IMO**; **2**; 1	**IMO**; **3** DSQ	RBR; 1; 1	RBR; 2; 3	RBR; 3; 20	MUG; 1; 4	MUG; 2; 7	MUG; 3; 10	MNZ; 1; 1	MNZ; 2; 1	MNZ; 3; 1	1st	343

=== Complete GB3 Championship results ===
(key) (Races in bold indicate pole position) (Races in italics indicate fastest lap)

Year	Entrant	1	2	3	4	5	6	7	8	9	10	11	12	13	14	15	16	17	18	19	20	21	22	23	24	DC	Points
2021	Fortec Motorsports	BRH; 1; 2	BRH; 2; 2	BRH; 3; 9^{9}	SIL1; 1	SIL1; 2	SIL1; 3	DON1; 1	DON1; 2	DON1; 3	SPA; 1	SPA; 2	SPA; 3	**SNE**; **1**; 1	SNE; 2 Ret	SNE; 3; 14	**SIL2**; **1** Ret	SIL2; 2; 2	SIL2; 3; 4^{10}	OUL; 1	OUL; 2	OUL; 3	DON2; 1	DON2; 2	DON2; 3	14th	163

=== Complete Formula Regional Asian Championship results ===
(key) (Races in bold indicate pole position) (Races in italics indicate the fastest lap of top ten finishers)

Year	Entrant	1	2	3	4	5	6	7	8	9	10	11	12	13	14	15	DC	Points
2022	Mumbai Falcons India Racing	ABU; 1	ABU; 2	ABU; 3	DUB; 1	DUB; 2	DUB; 3	DUB; 1	DUB; 2	DUB; 3	DUB; 1; 7	DUB; 2; 3	DUB; 3; 24	ABU; 1; 6	ABU; 2 Ret	ABU; 3; 23	15th	29

=== Complete FIA Formula 3 Championship results ===
(key) (Races in bold indicate pole position) (Races in italics indicate fastest lap)

Year	Entrant	1	2	3	4	5	6	7	8	9	10	11	12	13	14	15	16	17	18	DC	Points
2022	Prema Racing	BHR; SPR; 2	BHR; FEA; 6	IMO; SPR; 12	IMO; FEA; 17	CAT; SPR; 12	CAT; FEA; 5	SIL; SPR; 9	SIL; FEA; 3	RBR; SPR; 16	RBR; FEA; 3	HUN; SPR; 5	HUN; FEA; 3	SPA; SPR; 1	SPA; FEA; 3	ZAN; SPR; 11	ZAN; FEA; 25	MNZ; SPR; 2	MNZ; FEA; 2	3rd	132

=== Complete FIA Formula 2 Championship results ===
(key) (Races in bold indicate pole position) (Races in italics indicate points for the fastest lap of top ten finishers)

Year	Entrant	1	2	3	4	5	6	7	8	9	10	11	12	13	14	15	16	17	18	19	20	21	22	23	24	25	26	27	28	DC	Points
2023	Prema Racing	BHR; SPR; 15	BHR; FEA; 14	JED; SPR; Ret	JED; FEA; 10	MEL; SPR; 7	MEL; FEA; 17	BAK; SPR; 1	**BAK**; **FEA**; 1	MCO; SPR; Ret	MCO; FEA; 11	CAT; SPR; 7	**CAT**; **FEA**; 1	RBR; SPR; 8	RBR; FEA; 5	SIL; SPR; 6	SIL; FEA; 8	HUN; SPR; 3	HUN; FEA; 12	SPA; SPR; 12	**SPA**; **FEA**; 7	ZAN; SPR; 3	ZAN; FEA; Ret	MNZ; SPR; 6	MNZ; FEA; 1	YMC; SPR; 10	YMC; FEA; Ret			6th	130
2024	Prema Racing	BHR; SPR; 16	BHR; FEA; 15	JED; SPR; WD	JED; FEA; WD	MEL; SPR; 14	MEL; FEA; 9	IMO; SPR; 5	IMO; FEA; 19	MON; SPR; 11	MON; FEA; 4	CAT; SPR; 21	CAT; FEA; 14	RBR; SPR; 1	RBR; FEA; Ret	SIL; SPR; Ret	SIL; FEA; 7	HUN; SPR; 10	HUN; FEA; 15	SPA; SPR; 7	SPA; FEA; Ret	MNZ; SPR; 1	MNZ; FEA; 7	BAK; SPR	BAK; FEA	LSL; SPR; 1	LSL; FEA; 12	YMC; SPR; 4	YMC; FEA; 5	12th	75

=== Complete Formula One results ===
(key) (Races in bold indicate pole position) (Races in italics indicate fastest lap)

Year	Entrant	Chassis	Engine	1	2	3	4	5	6	7	8	9	10	11	12	13	14	15	16	17	18	19	20	21	22	23	24	WDC	Points
2023	MoneyGram Haas F1 Team	Haas VF-23	Ferrari 066/10 1.6 V6 t	BHR	SAU	AUS	AZE	MIA	MON	ESP	CAN	AUT	GBR	HUN	BEL	NED	ITA	SIN	JPN	QAT	USA	MXC; TD	SAP	LVG	ABU; TD			–	–
2024	Scuderia Ferrari	Ferrari SF-24	Ferrari 066/12 1.6 V6 t	BHR	SAU; 7	AUS	JPN	CHN	MIA														MXC; TD					18th	7
2024	MoneyGram Haas F1 Team	Haas VF-24	Ferrari 066/10 1.6 V6 t							EMI; TD	MON	CAN	ESP; TD	AUT	GBR; TD	HUN; TD	BEL	NED	ITA	AZE; 10	SIN	USA		SAP; 12	LVG	QAT	ABU	18th	7
2025	MoneyGram Haas F1 Team	Haas VF-25	Ferrari 066/15 1.6 V6 t	AUS; 14	CHN; 8	JPN; 10	BHR; 10	SAU; 13	MIA; Ret	EMI; 17	MON; 12	ESP; 17	CAN; 11	AUT; 11	GBR; 11	BEL; 11^{7}	HUN; Ret	NED; 6	ITA; 12	AZE; 12	SIN; 9	USA; 9	MXC; 4	SAP; 6	LVG; 10	QAT; Ret	ABU; 12	13th	41
2026	TGR Haas F1 Team	Haas VF-26	Ferrari 067/6 1.6 V6 t	AUS; 7	CHN; 5^{8}	JPN; Ret	MIA; 11	CAN; 10	MON; Ret	BCN; 17†	AUT; 14	GBR; 12	BEL; 14	HUN; 19	NED; Ret	ITA; 15	ESP; 16	AZE; 9	BHR; 14	SIN; 12^{6}	USA; Ret	MXC; Ret	SAP; 17	LVG	QAT	ABU		13th*	23*

^{†} Did not finish, but was classified as he had completed more than 90% of the race distance.
* Season still in progress.

== Notes ==
Sporting positions
Preceded by Gabriele Minì	Italian F4 Championship; Champion; 2021	Succeeded by Andrea Kimi Antonelli
Preceded by Jonny Edgar	ADAC Formula 4 Champion; 2021	Succeeded by Andrea Kimi Antonelli
Awards and achievements
Preceded by Dan Harper (2019)	Henry Surtees Award; 2021	Succeeded by Louis Foster (2022)
