= 2025 Bahrain Grand Prix =

Fourth round of the 2025 Formula One season

Race 4 of 24 in the 2025 Formula One World Championship
← Previous race	Next race →
- Layout of the Bahrain International Circuit

Race details
- Date: 13 April 2025
- Official name: Formula 1 Gulf Air Bahrain Grand Prix 2025
- Location: Bahrain International Circuit; Sakhir, Bahrain
- Course: Permanent racing facility
- Course length: 5.412 km (3.363 miles)
- Distance: 57 laps, 308.238 km (190.253 miles)
- Weather: Clear
- Attendance: 105,000

Pole position
Driver	(Australia) Oscar Piastri	McLaren-Mercedes
- Time: 1:29.841

Fastest lap
Driver	(Australia) Oscar Piastri	McLaren-Mercedes
- Time: 1:35.140 on lap 36

Podium
First	(Australia) Oscar Piastri	McLaren-Mercedes
Second	(United Kingdom) George Russell	Mercedes
Third	(United Kingdom) Lando Norris	McLaren-Mercedes

The 2025 Bahrain Grand Prix (officially known as the Formula 1 Gulf Air Bahrain Grand Prix 2025) was a Formula One motor race that was held on 13 April 2025 at the Bahrain International Circuit in Sakhir, Bahrain. It was the fourth round of the 2025 Formula One World Championship. Oscar Piastri of McLaren converted his pole position to a victory, ahead of George Russell of Mercedes and Piastri's teammate Lando Norris.

Norris remained the leader in the Drivers' Championship following his fourth podium in the first four races. With 77 points, he was three points clear of Piastri, who leapfrogged Max Verstappen for second in the championship. Reigning Constructors' Champion McLaren (151 points) once again extended their lead in the Constructors' Championship to 58 points over Mercedes.

== Background ==
The event was held at the Bahrain International Circuit in Sakhir for the 21st time in the circuit's history, across the weekend of 11–13 April. The Grand Prix was the fourth round of the 2025 Formula One World Championship and the 21st running of the Bahrain Grand Prix.

=== Championship standings before the race ===
Going into the event, Lando Norris led the Drivers' Championship with 62 points, one point ahead of Max Verstappen in second, and thirteen ahead of Oscar Piastri in third. McLaren, with 111 points, entered the race as the leader in the Constructors' Championship from Mercedes in second with 75 points, and Red Bull Racing third with 61 points.

=== Entrants ===
The drivers and teams were the same as published in the season entry list with one exception. Yuki Tsunoda at Red Bull Racing was in the seat originally held by Liam Lawson before the latter was demoted back to Racing Bulls from the preceding Japanese Grand Prix onward.

During the first free practice session, six teams fielded alternate drivers who had not raced in more than two Grands Prix, as required by the Formula One regulations:

- Dino Beganovic for Ferrari in place of Charles Leclerc, making his Formula One practice debut.
- Ryō Hirakawa for Haas in place of Oliver Bearman.
- Frederik Vesti for Mercedes in place of George Russell.
- Felipe Drugovich for Aston Martin in place of Fernando Alonso.
- Luke Browning for Williams in place of Carlos Sainz Jr.
- Ayumu Iwasa for Red Bull Racing in place of Max Verstappen.

=== Tyre choices ===
Tyre supplier Pirelli brought the C1, C2, and C3 tyre compounds (the three hardest in their range) designated hard, medium, and soft, respectively, for teams to use at the event.

== Practice ==
Three free practice sessions were held for the event. The first free practice session was held on 11 April 2025, at 14:30 local time (UTC+3), and was topped by Lando Norris of McLaren ahead of Pierre Gasly of Alpine and Lewis Hamilton of Ferrari. The second free practice session was held on the same day, at 18:00 local time, and was topped by Oscar Piastri of McLaren ahead of his teammate Norris and George Russell of Mercedes. The third free practice session was held on 12 April 2025, at 15:30 local time, and was topped by Piastri ahead of his teammate Norris and Charles Leclerc of Ferrari.

== Qualifying ==
Qualifying was held on 12 April 2025, at 19:00 local time (UTC+3), and determined the starting grid order for the race.

=== Qualifying report ===
A brief red flag was observed during Q2 as Esteban Ocon crashed his Haas car going into turn two. Sauber's Nico Hülkenberg advanced to Q2 and qualified thirteenth, despite breaching track limits during Q1 at turn 11. It was reported during Q2, and the stewards deleted his Q1 lap time after qualifying, along with those set in Q2, relegating him to sixteenth. Alexander Albon of Williams, who had been knocked out in Q1, was affected by this, as he was restricted from doing Q2, despite his representative Q1 lap time being fast enough to advance.

=== Qualifying classification ===
Pos.	No.	Driver	Constructor	Qualifying times			Final grid
Pos.	No.	Driver	Constructor	Q1	Q2	Q3	Final grid
1	81	(Australia) Oscar Piastri	McLaren-Mercedes	1:31.392	1:30.454	1:29.841	1
2	63	(United Kingdom) George Russell	Mercedes	1:31.494	1:30.664	1:30.009	3^{1}
3	16	(Monaco) Charles Leclerc	Ferrari	1:31.454	1:30.724	1:30.175	2
4	12	(Italy) Kimi Antonelli	Mercedes	1:31.415	1:30.716	1:30.213	5^{1}
5	10	(France) Pierre Gasly	Alpine-Renault	1:31.462	1:30.643	1:30.216	4
6	4	(United Kingdom) Lando Norris	McLaren-Mercedes	1:31.107	1:30.560	1:30.267	6
7	1	(Netherlands) Max Verstappen	Red Bull Racing-Honda RBPT	1:31.303	1:31.019	1:30.423	7
8	55	(Spain) Carlos Sainz Jr.	Williams-Mercedes	1:31.591	1:30.844	1:30.680	8
9	44	(United Kingdom) Lewis Hamilton	Ferrari	1:31.219	1:31.009	1:30.772	9
10	22	(Japan) Yuki Tsunoda	Red Bull Racing-Honda RBPT	1:31.751	1:31.228	1:31.303	10
11	7	(Australia) Jack Doohan	Alpine-Renault	1:31.414	1:31.245	N/A	11
12	6	(France) Isack Hadjar	Racing Bulls-Honda RBPT	1:31.591	1:31.271	N/A	12
13	14	(Spain) Fernando Alonso	Aston Martin Aramco-Mercedes	1:31.634	1:31.886	N/A	13
14	31	(France) Esteban Ocon	Haas-Ferrari	1:31.594	No time	N/A	14
15	23	(Thailand) Alexander Albon	Williams-Mercedes	1:32.040	N/A	N/A	15
16	27	(Germany) Nico Hülkenberg	Kick Sauber-Ferrari	1:32.067	No time	N/A	16
17	30	(New Zealand) Liam Lawson	Racing Bulls-Honda RBPT	1:32.165	N/A	N/A	17
18	5	(Brazil) Gabriel Bortoleto	Kick Sauber-Ferrari	1:32.186	N/A	N/A	18
19	18	(Canada) Lance Stroll	Aston Martin Aramco-Mercedes	1:32.283	N/A	N/A	19
20	87	(United Kingdom) Oliver Bearman	Haas-Ferrari	1:32.373	N/A	N/A	20
107% time: 1:37.484

Notes

- ^1 – George Russell and Kimi Antonelli both received a one-place grid penalty for entering the fast lane in the pit lane before a re-start time was confirmed.

== Race ==
The race was held on 13 April 2025, at 18:00 local time (UTC+3), and was run for 57 laps.

=== Race report ===
Polesitter Oscar Piastri of McLaren successfully defended his lead into turn 1 after a challenge from George Russell of Mercedes, who gained one position to move into 2nd place. Piastri's teammate Lando Norris took third having started from sixth, before being awarded a penalty for not lining up correctly in his grid spot. Russell's teammate, Kimi Antonelli, initially passed Pierre Gasly of Alpine on the run to turn 1 to hold 5th place, but was then repassed by Gasly at turn 6. This forced Antonelli to run wide, resulting in him losing out to Carlos Sainz. Jr of Williams at the exit of the turn 8 hairpin, and he completed the first lap in 7th. On lap 5, Antonelli repassed Sainz at turn 1, with Max Verstappen of Red Bull following him through at turn 6. On lap 9, Leclerc's teammate Lewis Hamilton attempted to pass Sainz at turn 4, however ran wide exiting the turn; this allowed Sainz to retake the place at turn 6. Hamilton made the move stick at turn 11, with Verstappen's teammate Yuki Tsunoda also getting through at turn 12, dropping Sainz to 9th.

On lap 10, Antonelli passed Gasly at turn 4 to take 5th after a short battle. At the end of the lap, Norris pitted for medium tyres and served his time penalty in the process, re-joining in 14th position. By pitting early, Norris was able to utilise the undercut effect, and therefore avoided losing positions to his rivals during the pit stop cycle. On lap 15, race leader Piastri pitted, re-joining on the medium tyre 2 seconds ahead of Russell. This left the two Ferraris leading the race. Both Ferraris would pit on lap 17 for a second set of medium tyres; Leclerc emerged behind Gasly but quickly passed him at turn 11 to retake 4th. On lap 20, Antonelli passed Verstappen exiting turn 4 to take 7th, having fallen behind him during the pitstops. Verstappen, struggling on hard tyres, was passed by Hamilton two laps later at turn 11. On lap 25, Leclerc passed Norris for 3rd at turn 4 as Hamilton simultaneously passed Antonelli for 7th at turn 1, younger tyres proving to be an effective advantage for both Ferraris.

On lap 31, Tsunoda and Sainz made contact at turn 1 whilst disputing 6th position. This incident left a large amount of debris on track, which caused the safety car to be deployed. Drivers who had not yet make their second pitstops took advantage of the slowed pace to change tyres, led by Piastri, Russell, Leclerc, Norris and Hamilton. As the race resumed on lap 35, the top 10 was as follows; Piastri, Russell, Leclerc, Norris, Hamilton, Gasly, Esteban Ocon of Haas, Verstappen, Gasly's teammate Jack Doohan, and Sainz. Antontelli was the only driver to make a third pit stop behind the safety car, and as a result had dropped to 14th. Leclerc reacted slowly at the restart, and was immediately challenged by Norris entering turn 1. Norris could not make the move stick, and was himself passed by Hamilton.

On lap 38, Norris passed Hamilton at turn 4 to take 4th position, with Verstappen passing Ocon at turn 1 to take 7th. Russell, still running 2nd despite concern about the durability of his soft tyres, began struggling with electrical issues on his car. Initially, this presented itself as a transponder failure, which forced his team to override his DRS as it would not activate due to the faulty transponder. Russell then reported issues with his brake-by-wire system, GPS, dashboard display, and the buttons on his steering wheel. The electrical problems also caused issues for the live timing system. This issue was circumvented by using a fallback lap-by-lap timing system. On lap 46 Sainz, who had fallen down the field since the restart, retired due to ongoing issues resulting from his earlier collision with Tsunoda. As the race entered its final laps Norris was chasing Leclerc, who was struggling on hard tyres, for 3rd position, and he took the position on lap 52 at turn 4, after multiple attempts. On the final lap, Norris attempted to pass Russell around the outside of turn 1, Russell successfully defended the attack.

Piastri crossed the finished line with a 15 second lead over Russell to take his 4th career Grand Prix victory, achieving both his and McLaren's first win at the Bahrain Grand Prix. Russell took his best result in Bahrain with second ahead of Norris and Leclerc, although this was briefly thrown into doubt by an investigation over a suspected DRS infringement, whilst Hamilton finished 5th to take his best Grand Prix finish with Ferrari so far. Despite being overtaken by Verstappen at turn 4 on the last lap, Gasly could still celebrate his and Alpine's first points of the season. Haas enjoyed a double points score with Ocon in 8th and Oliver Bearman in 10th, the latter having progressed from being last on the grid. Tsunoda's 9th place gave him his first points finish for Red Bull. Having initially finished 13th, Nico Hülkenberg of Sauber was disqualified after the race, as his car's plank was discovered to be excessively worn down.

Norris remained the leader in the Drivers' Championship following his fourth podium in the first four races. With 77 points, he was three points clear of Piastri, who leapfrogged Max Verstappen for second in the championship. Russell, with a total of 63 points in fourth, closed the gap to third-placed Verstappen to six points, while Charles Leclerc improved to fifth in the standings with 32 points, overtaking Kimi Antonelli who endured his first pointless race in his campaign. Reigning Constructors' Champion McLaren (151 points) once again extended their lead in the Constructors' Championship to 58 points over Mercedes. While Red Bull and Ferrari remained in third and fourth respectively, Haas were able to overtake Williams for fifth in the standings after a strong weekend, combined with a disappointing one for Williams.

=== Race classification ===
Pos.	No.	Driver	Constructor	Laps	Time/Retired	Grid	Points
1	81	(Australia) Oscar Piastri	McLaren-Mercedes	57	1:35:39.435	1	25
2	63	(United Kingdom) George Russell	Mercedes	57	+15.499	3	18
3	4	(United Kingdom) Lando Norris	McLaren-Mercedes	57	+16.273	6	15
4	16	(Monaco) Charles Leclerc	Ferrari	57	+19.679	2	12
5	44	(United Kingdom) Lewis Hamilton	Ferrari	57	+27.993	9	10
6	1	(Netherlands) Max Verstappen	Red Bull Racing-Honda RBPT	57	+34.395	7	8
7	10	(France) Pierre Gasly	Alpine-Renault	57	+36.002	4	6
8	31	(France) Esteban Ocon	Haas-Ferrari	57	+44.244	14	4
9	22	(Japan) Yuki Tsunoda	Red Bull Racing-Honda RBPT	57	+45.061	10	2
10	87	(United Kingdom) Oliver Bearman	Haas-Ferrari	57	+47.594	20	1
11	12	(Italy) Kimi Antonelli	Mercedes	57	+48.016	5	
12	23	(Thailand) Alexander Albon	Williams-Mercedes	57	+48.839	15	
13	6	(France) Isack Hadjar	Racing Bulls-Honda RBPT	57	+56.314	12	
14	7	(Australia) Jack Doohan	Alpine-Renault	57	+57.806^{1}	11	
15	14	(Spain) Fernando Alonso	Aston Martin Aramco-Mercedes	57	+1:00.340	13	
16	30	(New Zealand) Liam Lawson	Racing Bulls-Honda RBPT	57	+1:04.435^{2}	17	
17	18	(Canada) Lance Stroll	Aston Martin Aramco-Mercedes	57	+1:05.489	19	
18	5	(Brazil) Gabriel Bortoleto	Kick Sauber-Ferrari	57	+1:06.872	18	
Ret	55	(Spain) Carlos Sainz Jr.	Williams-Mercedes	45	Collision damage	8	
DSQ	27	(Germany) Nico Hülkenberg	Kick Sauber-Ferrari	57	Plank wear^{3}	16	

Notes

- ^1 – Jack Doohan received a five-second time penalty for exceeding track limits. This initially dropped him to 15th in the provisional classification, but was promoted one place following Nico Hülkenberg's disqualification.
- ^2 – Liam Lawson received a five-second time penalty for causing a collision with Lance Stroll and a ten-second time penalty for causing a collision with Nico Hülkenberg. This initially dropped him to 17th in the provisional classification, but was promoted one place following Nico Hülkenberg's disqualification.
- ^3 – Nico Hülkenberg was provisionally classified in 13th, but was disqualified for excessive plank wear.

== Championship standings after the race ==
Drivers' Championship standings

	Pos.	Driver	Points
	1	(United Kingdom) Lando Norris	77
1	2	(Australia) Oscar Piastri	74
1	3	(Netherlands) Max Verstappen	69
	4	(United Kingdom) George Russell	63
1	5	(Monaco) Charles Leclerc	32

Constructors' Championship standings

	Pos.	Constructor	Points
	1	(United Kingdom) McLaren-Mercedes	151
	2	(Germany) Mercedes	93
	3	(Austria) Red Bull Racing-Honda RBPT	71
	4	(Italy) Ferrari	57
1	5	(United States) Haas-Ferrari	20

- Note: Only the top five positions are included for both sets of standings.

== See also ==
- 2025 Sakhir Formula 2 round
- 2025 Sakhir Formula 3 round

Previous race: 2025 Japanese Grand Prix	FIA Formula One World Championship; 2025 season	Next race: 2025 Saudi Arabian Grand Prix
Previous race: 2024 Bahrain Grand Prix	Bahrain Grand Prix	Next race: 2026 Bahrain Grand Prix
