= 2025 Japanese Grand Prix =

Third round of the 2025 F1 season

Race 3 of 24 in the 2025 Formula One World Championship
| ← Previous race | Next race → |
- Layout of the Suzuka International Racing Course

Race details
- Date: 6 April 2025
- Official name: Formula 1 Lenovo Japanese Grand Prix 2025
- Location: Suzuka International Racing Course; Suzuka, Mie Prefecture, Japan
- Course: Permanent racing facility
- Course length: 5.807 km (3.608 miles)
- Distance: 53 laps, 307.471 km (191.054 miles)
- Weather: Cloudy
- Attendance: 266,000

Pole position
| Driver | (Netherlands) Max Verstappen | Red Bull Racing-Honda RBPT |
- Time: 1:26.983

Fastest lap
| Driver | (Italy) Kimi Antonelli | Mercedes |
- Time: 1:30.965 on lap 50 (lap record)

Podium
| First | (Netherlands) Max Verstappen | Red Bull Racing-Honda RBPT |
| Second | (United Kingdom) Lando Norris | McLaren-Mercedes |
| Third | (Australia) Oscar Piastri | McLaren-Mercedes |

The 2025 Japanese Grand Prix (officially known as the Formula 1 Lenovo Japanese Grand Prix 2025) was a Formula One motor race held on 6 April 2025 at the Suzuka International Racing Course in Suzuka, Japan. It was the third round of the 2025 Formula One World Championship.

Max Verstappen of Red Bull Racing took pole position for the race, which he went on to win, with the two McLarens of Lando Norris and Oscar Piastri completing the podium. Kimi Antonelli of Mercedes broke two records and became the youngest driver in Formula 1 history to lead laps and set the fastest lap.

After winning for the first time in the season, Verstappen closed up to Norris in the Drivers' Championship to one point. Piastri moved to third with 49 points, four more than Russell who fell to fourth. In the Constructors' Standings, the top three remained unchanged, with McLaren extending their lead to 36 points over second-placed Mercedes.

== Background ==
The event was held at the Suzuka International Racing Course in Suzuka for the 35th time in the circuit's history, across the weekend of 4–6 April. The Grand Prix was the third round of the 2025 Formula One World Championship and the 39th running of the Japanese Grand Prix as a round of the Formula One World Championship.

This race was Scuderia Ferrari's 1100th start in a World Championship event as a team.

=== Championship standings before the race ===
Going into the event, Lando Norris led the Drivers' Championship with 44 points, 8 points ahead of Max Verstappen in second, and 9 ahead of George Russell in third. McLaren, with 78 points, entered the race as the leader in the Constructors' Championship from Mercedes in second with 57 points, and Red Bull Racing third with 36 points.

=== Entrants ===
The drivers and teams were the same as published in the season entry list with one exception. Liam Lawson, who previously raced for Red Bull Racing, swapped teams with Yuki Tsunoda of Racing Bulls. Tsunoda made his Red Bull Racing debut. Ryō Hirakawa took part in the first free practice session for Alpine in place of Jack Doohan.

=== Tyre choices ===
Tyre supplier Pirelli brought the C1, C2, and C3 tyre compounds (the three hardest in their range) designated hard, medium, and soft, respectively, for teams to use at the event.

== Practice ==
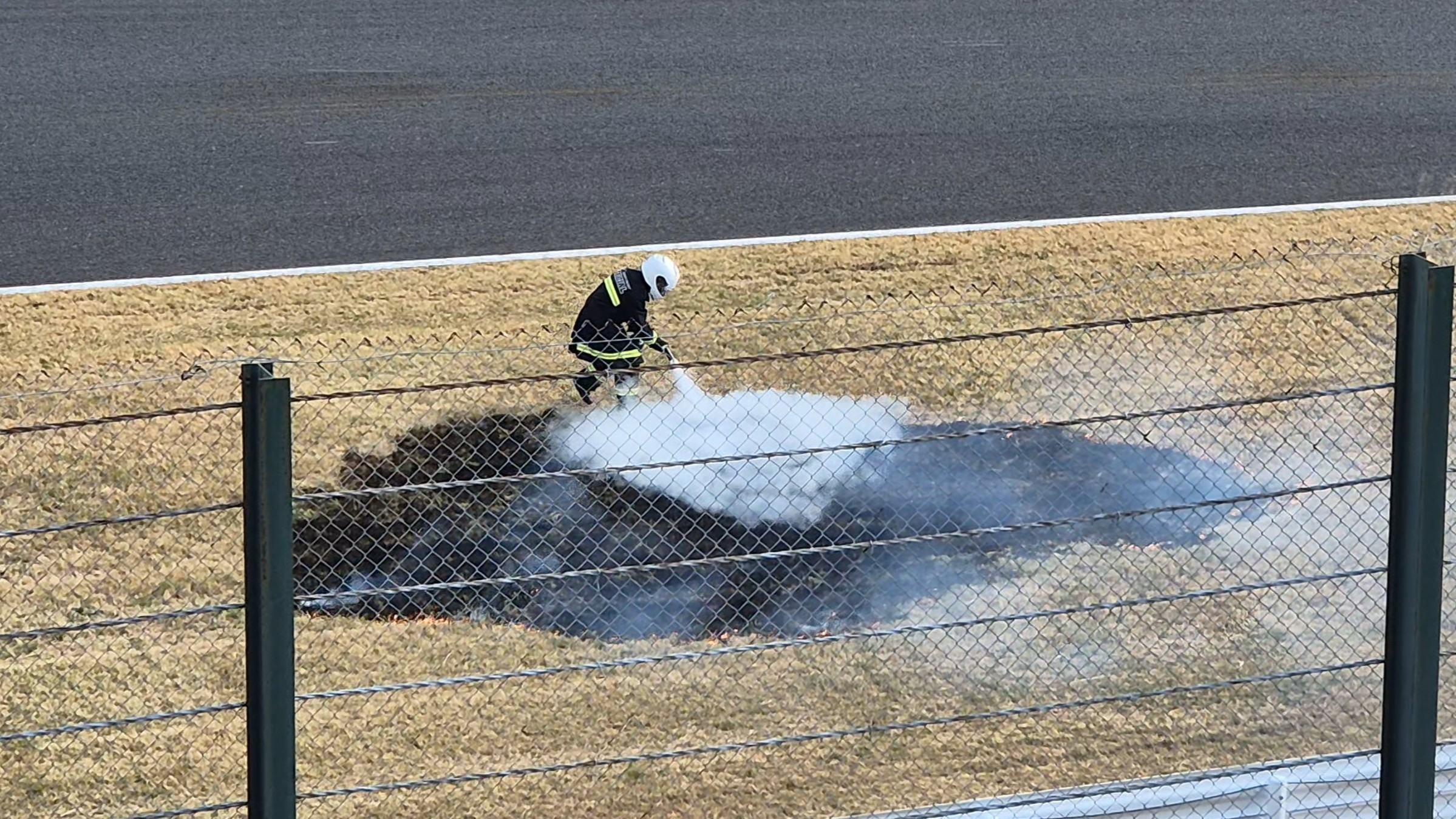
Grass fires prompted several red flag periods throughout free practice.

Three free practice sessions were held for the event. The first free practice session was held on 4 April 2025, at 11:30 local time (UTC+9), and was topped by Lando Norris of McLaren ahead of George Russell of Mercedes, and Charles Leclerc of Ferrari. The second free practice session was held on the same day, at 15:00 local time, and was topped by Oscar Piastri of McLaren ahead of his teammate Norris and Isack Hadjar of Racing Bulls. Four red flags were observed, heavily disrupting the session: the first due to Jack Doohan of Alpine crashing heavily into the barriers at turn 1, the second due to Fernando Alonso of Aston Martin spinning into the gravel around the Degner corners, and the final two due to two separate grass fires.

The third free practice session was held on 5 April 2025, at 11:30 local time, and was topped by Norris ahead of his teammate Piastri and Russell. Two more patches of grass, this time at turns 12 and 15, respectively, caught fire, facilitating two red flags.

== Qualifying ==
Qualifying was held on 5 April 2025, at 15:00 local time (UTC+9), and determined the starting grid order for the race.

=== Qualifying classification ===
| Pos. | No. | Driver | Constructor | Qualifying times | | | Final grid |
| Pos. | No. | Driver | Constructor | Q1 | Q2 | Q3 | Final grid |
|---|---|---|---|---|---|---|---|
| 1 | 1 | (Netherlands) Max Verstappen | Red Bull Racing-Honda RBPT | 1:27.943 | 1:27.502 | 1:26.983 | 1 |
| 2 | 4 | (United Kingdom) Lando Norris | McLaren-Mercedes | 1:27.845 | 1:27.146 | 1:26.995 | 2 |
| 3 | 81 | (Australia) Oscar Piastri | McLaren-Mercedes | 1:27.687 | 1:27.507 | 1:27.027 | 3 |
| 4 | 16 | (Monaco) Charles Leclerc | Ferrari | 1:27.920 | 1:27.555 | 1:27.299 | 4 |
| 5 | 63 | (United Kingdom) George Russell | Mercedes | 1:27.843 | 1:27.400 | 1:27.318 | 5 |
| 6 | 12 | (Italy) Kimi Antonelli | Mercedes | 1:27.968 | 1:27.639 | 1:27.555 | 6 |
| 7 | 6 | (France) Isack Hadjar | Racing Bulls-Honda RBPT | 1:28.278 | 1:27.775 | 1:27.569 | 7 |
| 8 | 44 | (United Kingdom) Lewis Hamilton | Ferrari | 1:27.942 | 1:27.610 | 1:27.610 | 8 |
| 9 | 23 | (Thailand) Alexander Albon | Williams-Mercedes | 1:28.218 | 1:27.783 | 1:27.615 | 9 |
| 10 | 87 | (United Kingdom) Oliver Bearman | Haas-Ferrari | 1:28.228 | 1:27.711 | 1:27.867 | 10 |
| 11 | 10 | (France) Pierre Gasly | Alpine-Renault | 1:28.186 | 1:27.822 | N/A | 11 |
| 12 | 55 | (Spain) Carlos Sainz Jr. | Williams-Mercedes | 1:28.209 | 1:27.836 | N/A | 15^{1} |
| 13 | 14 | (Spain) Fernando Alonso | Aston Martin Aramco-Mercedes | 1:28.337 | 1:27.897 | N/A | 12 |
| 14 | 30 | (New Zealand) Liam Lawson | Racing Bulls-Honda RBPT | 1:28.554 | 1:27.906 | N/A | 13 |
| 15 | 22 | (Japan) Yuki Tsunoda | Red Bull Racing-Honda RBPT | 1:27.967 | 1:28.000 | N/A | 14 |
| 16 | 27 | (Germany) Nico Hülkenberg | Kick Sauber-Ferrari | 1:28.570 | N/A | N/A | 16 |
| 17 | 5 | (Brazil) Gabriel Bortoleto | Kick Sauber-Ferrari | 1:28.622 | N/A | N/A | 17 |
| 18 | 31 | (France) Esteban Ocon | Haas-Ferrari | 1:28.696 | N/A | N/A | 18 |
| 19 | 7 | (Australia) Jack Doohan | Alpine-Renault | 1:28.877 | N/A | N/A | 19 |
| 20 | 18 | (Canada) Lance Stroll | Aston Martin Aramco-Mercedes | 1:29.271 | N/A | N/A | 20 |
107% time: 1:33.825

Notes

- ^1 – Carlos Sainz Jr. received a three-place grid penalty for impeding Lewis Hamilton in Q2.

== Race ==
The race was held on 6 April 2025, at 14:00 local time (UTC+9), and was run for 53 laps.

=== Race report ===
Max Verstappen of Red Bull Racing from pole position went on to win the race, with the two McLarens of Lando Norris and Oscar Piastri completing the podium. Kimi Antonelli of Mercedes became both the youngest driver to lead a race and to set a fastest lap in Formula One history.

=== Race classification ===
| Pos. | No. | Driver | Constructor | Laps | Time/Retired | Grid | Points |
|---|---|---|---|---|---|---|---|
| 1 | 1 | (Netherlands) Max Verstappen | Red Bull Racing-Honda RBPT | 53 | 1:22:06.983 | 1 | 25 |
| 2 | 4 | (United Kingdom) Lando Norris | McLaren-Mercedes | 53 | +1.423 | 2 | 18 |
| 3 | 81 | (Australia) Oscar Piastri | McLaren-Mercedes | 53 | +2.129 | 3 | 15 |
| 4 | 16 | (Monaco) Charles Leclerc | Ferrari | 53 | +16.097 | 4 | 12 |
| 5 | 63 | (United Kingdom) George Russell | Mercedes | 53 | +17.362 | 5 | 10 |
| 6 | 12 | (Italy) Kimi Antonelli | Mercedes | 53 | +18.671 | 6 | 8 |
| 7 | 44 | (United Kingdom) Lewis Hamilton | Ferrari | 53 | +29.182 | 8 | 6 |
| 8 | 6 | (France) Isack Hadjar | Racing Bulls-Honda RBPT | 53 | +37.134 | 7 | 4 |
| 9 | 23 | (Thailand) Alexander Albon | Williams-Mercedes | 53 | +40.367 | 9 | 2 |
| 10 | 87 | (United Kingdom) Oliver Bearman | Haas-Ferrari | 53 | +54.529 | 10 | 1 |
| 11 | 14 | (Spain) Fernando Alonso | Aston Martin Aramco-Mercedes | 53 | +57.333 | 12 | |
| 12 | 22 | (Japan) Yuki Tsunoda | Red Bull Racing-Honda RBPT | 53 | +58.401 | 14 | |
| 13 | 10 | (France) Pierre Gasly | Alpine-Renault | 53 | +1:02.122 | 11 | |
| 14 | 55 | (Spain) Carlos Sainz Jr. | Williams-Mercedes | 53 | +1:14.129 | 15 | |
| 15 | 7 | (Australia) Jack Doohan | Alpine-Renault | 53 | +1:21.314 | 19 | |
| 16 | 27 | (Germany) Nico Hülkenberg | Kick Sauber-Ferrari | 53 | +1:21.957 | 16 | |
| 17 | 30 | (New Zealand) Liam Lawson | Racing Bulls-Honda RBPT | 53 | +1:22.734 | 13 | |
| 18 | 31 | (France) Esteban Ocon | Haas-Ferrari | 53 | +1:23.438 | 18 | |
| 19 | 5 | (Brazil) Gabriel Bortoleto | Kick Sauber-Ferrari | 53 | +1:23.897 | 17 | |
| 20 | 18 | (Canada) Lance Stroll | Aston Martin Aramco-Mercedes | 52 | +1 lap | 20 | |

== Championship standings after the race ==
Drivers' Championship standings

| | Pos. | Driver | Points |
|---|---|---|---|
| | 1 | (United Kingdom) Lando Norris | 62 |
| | 2 | (Netherlands) Max Verstappen | 61 |
| 1 | 3 | (Australia) Oscar Piastri | 49 |
| 1 | 4 | (United Kingdom) George Russell | 45 |
| | 5 | (Italy) Kimi Antonelli | 30 |

Constructors' Championship standings

| | Pos. | Constructor | Points |
|---|---|---|---|
| | 1 | (United Kingdom) McLaren-Mercedes | 111 |
| | 2 | (Germany) Mercedes | 75 |
| | 3 | (Austria) Red Bull Racing-Honda RBPT | 61 |
| 1 | 4 | (Italy) Ferrari | 35 |
| 1 | 5 | (United Kingdom) Williams-Mercedes | 19 |

- Note: Only the top five positions are included for both sets of standings.

| Previous race: 2025 Chinese Grand Prix | FIA Formula One World Championship; 2025 season | Next race: 2025 Bahrain Grand Prix |
| Previous race: 2024 Japanese Grand Prix | Japanese Grand Prix | Next race: 2026 Japanese Grand Prix |
