= Tom Coupland =

British engineer

- Citizenship: British
- Education: Bournemouth University
- Occupation: Engineer
- Employer: Haas F1 Team
- Known for: Formula One engineer
- Title: Chief Designer

Tom Coupland is a British Formula One engineer. He is currently the Chief Designer at the Haas F1 Team.

== Career ==
Coupland studied at Bournemouth University before beginning his motorsport career in touring car racing with the Opel DTM programme in 2003, working as a design engineer. In 2005 he moved to Force India as a Senior Composite Design Engineer, contributing to the design and development of composite structures for the team's Formula One chassis. He continued in a similar role with Team Lotus between 2010 and 2012.

In 2012 Coupland joined Scuderia Ferrari as Chassis Design Project Leader, overseeing the delivery of composite chassis components and coordinating design activities across multiple departments. He was promoted to Deputy Head of Composite Design in 2015, a position he held for nearly six years, supporting Ferrari's structural design and manufacturing programmes during the hybrid era of Formula One.

Coupland joined the Haas F1 Team in 2021 as Head of Composite Design, leading the American team's composite engineering group and contributing to the development of its new-generation chassis concepts. In February 2024 he was appointed Chief Designer, taking overall responsibility for car design coordination, technical concept development, and integration of aerodynamic, structural, and mechanical systems.
