= 2025 Mexico City Grand Prix =

Twentieth round of the 2025 F1 season

Race 20 of 24 in the 2025 Formula One World Championship
| ← Previous race | Next race → |
- Layout of the Autódromo Hermanos Rodríguez

Race details
- Date: 26 October 2025
- Official name: Formula 1 Gran Premio de la Ciudad de México 2025
- Location: Autódromo Hermanos Rodríguez; Mexico City, Mexico
- Course: Permanent racing facility
- Course length: 4.304 km (2.674 miles)
- Distance: 71 laps, 305.354 km (189.738 miles)
- Weather: Sunny
- Attendance: 401,326

Pole position
| Driver | (United Kingdom) Lando Norris | McLaren-Mercedes |
- Time: 1:15.586

Fastest lap
| Driver | (United Kingdom) George Russell | Mercedes |
- Time: 1:20.052 on lap 50

Podium
| First | (United Kingdom) Lando Norris | McLaren-Mercedes |
| Second | (Monaco) Charles Leclerc | Ferrari |
| Third | (Netherlands) Max Verstappen | Red Bull Racing-Honda RBPT |

The 2025 Mexico City Grand Prix (officially known as the Formula 1 Gran Premio de la Ciudad de México 2025) was a Formula One motor race that was held on 26 October 2025 at the Autódromo Hermanos Rodríguez in Mexico City, Mexico. It was the twentieth round of the 2025 Formula One World Championship. McLaren driver Lando Norris converted pole position into a win, giving his team their first victory in Mexico since 1989. Charles Leclerc and Max Verstappen (driving for Ferrari and Red Bull respectively) rounded out the podium.

The result elevated Norris to the lead in the Drivers' Championship, for the first time since the 2025 Bahrain Grand Prix, one point ahead of his teammate Oscar Piastri, who finished fifth. Verstappen remained third, 36 points behind championship leader Norris. In the Constructors' Championship, McLaren moved to 713 points. Ferrari overtook Mercedes in the battle for second place by one point, with 356 and 355 points respectively, with Red Bull in fourth, ten points behind Ferrari.

== Background ==
The event was held at the Autódromo Hermanos Rodríguez in Mexico City for the 25th time in the circuit's history, having previously held twenty editions of the Mexican Grand Prix, across the weekend of 24–26 October. The Grand Prix was the twentieth round of the 2025 Formula One World Championship and the fifth held under the name of the Mexico City Grand Prix, having previously been titled the Mexican Grand Prix.

=== Championship standings before the race ===
Going into the weekend, Oscar Piastri led the Drivers' Championship with 346 points, 14 points ahead of Lando Norris in second, and 40 points ahead of Max Verstappen. McLaren, who won the Constructors' Championship at the Singapore Grand Prix, were ahead of Mercedes and Ferrari, who were second and third with 341 and 334 points, respectively.

=== Entrants ===
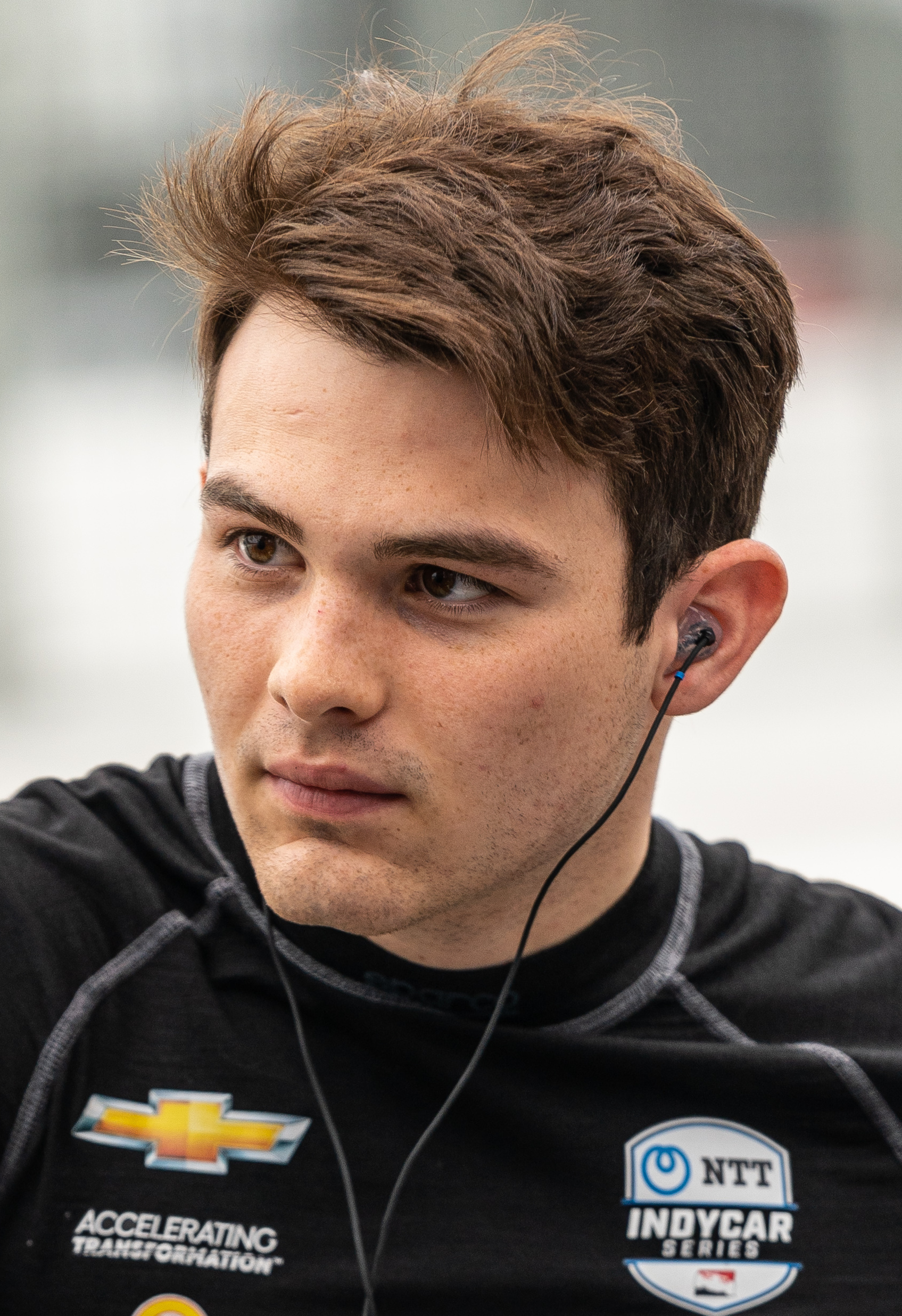
Patricio O'Ward

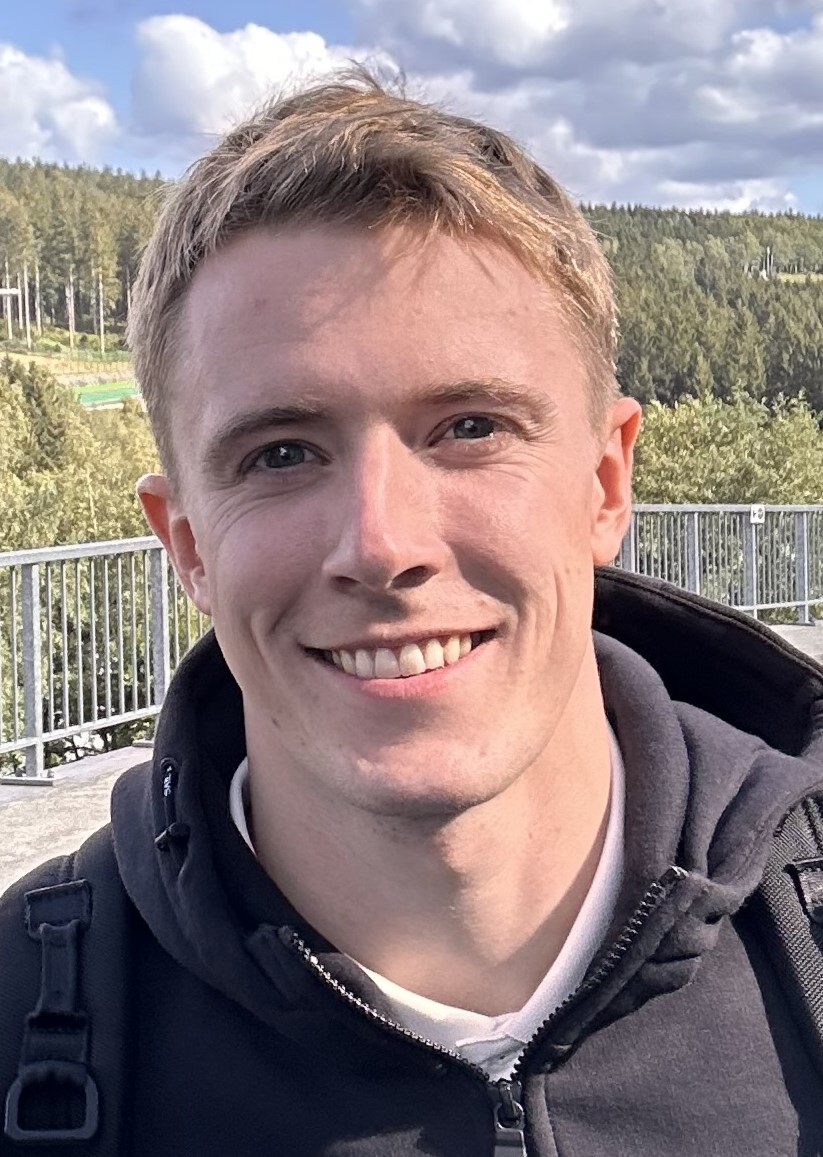
Frederik Vesti

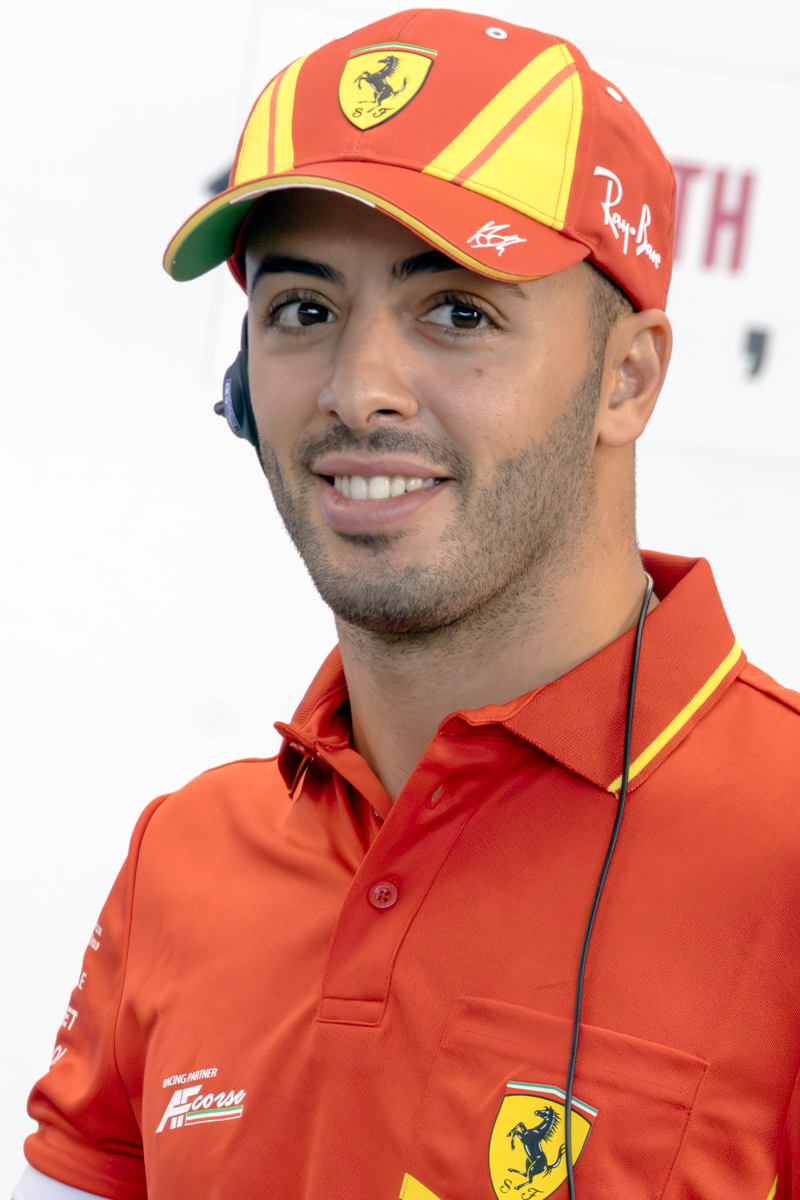
Antonio Fuoco

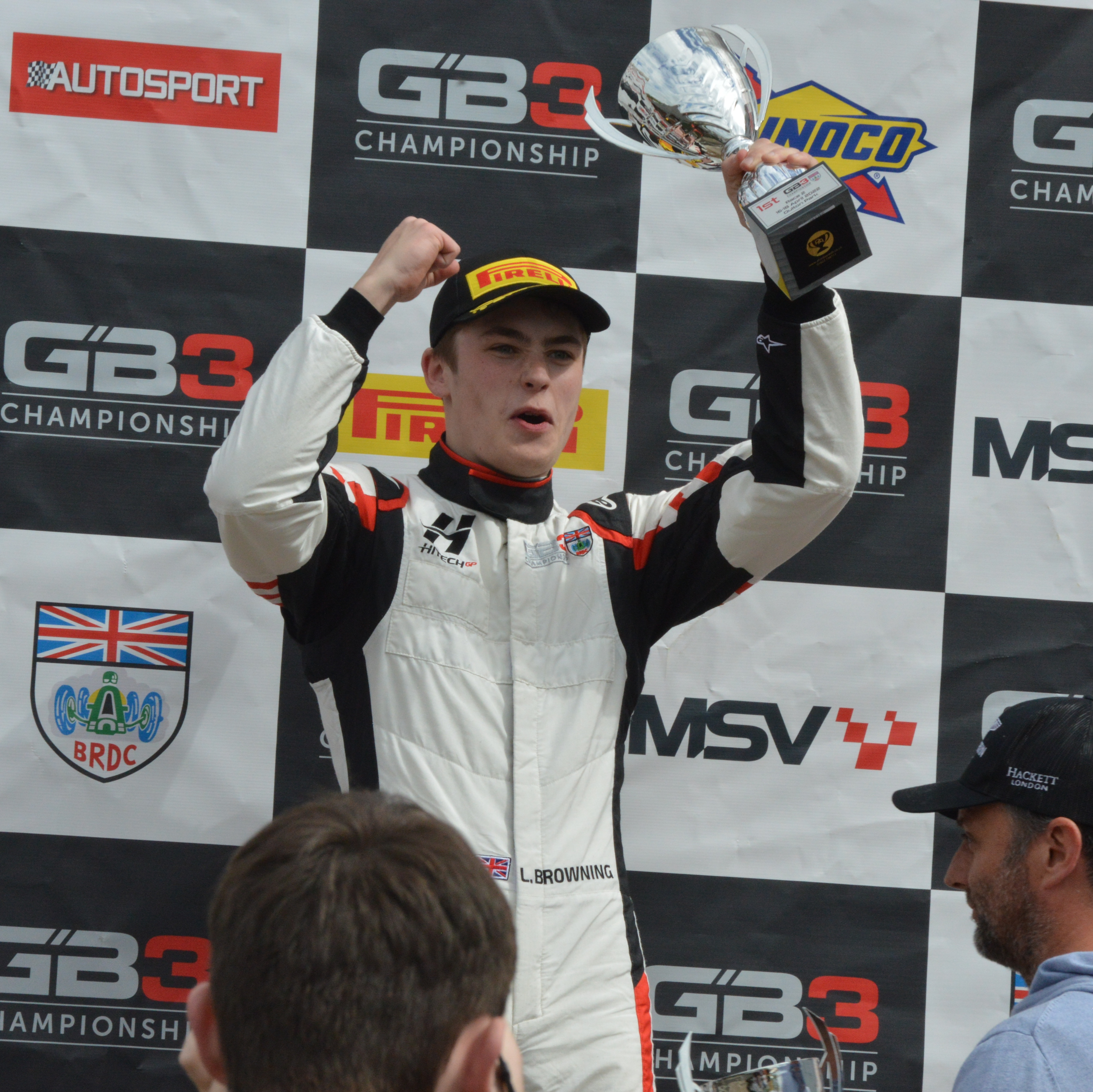
Luke Browning

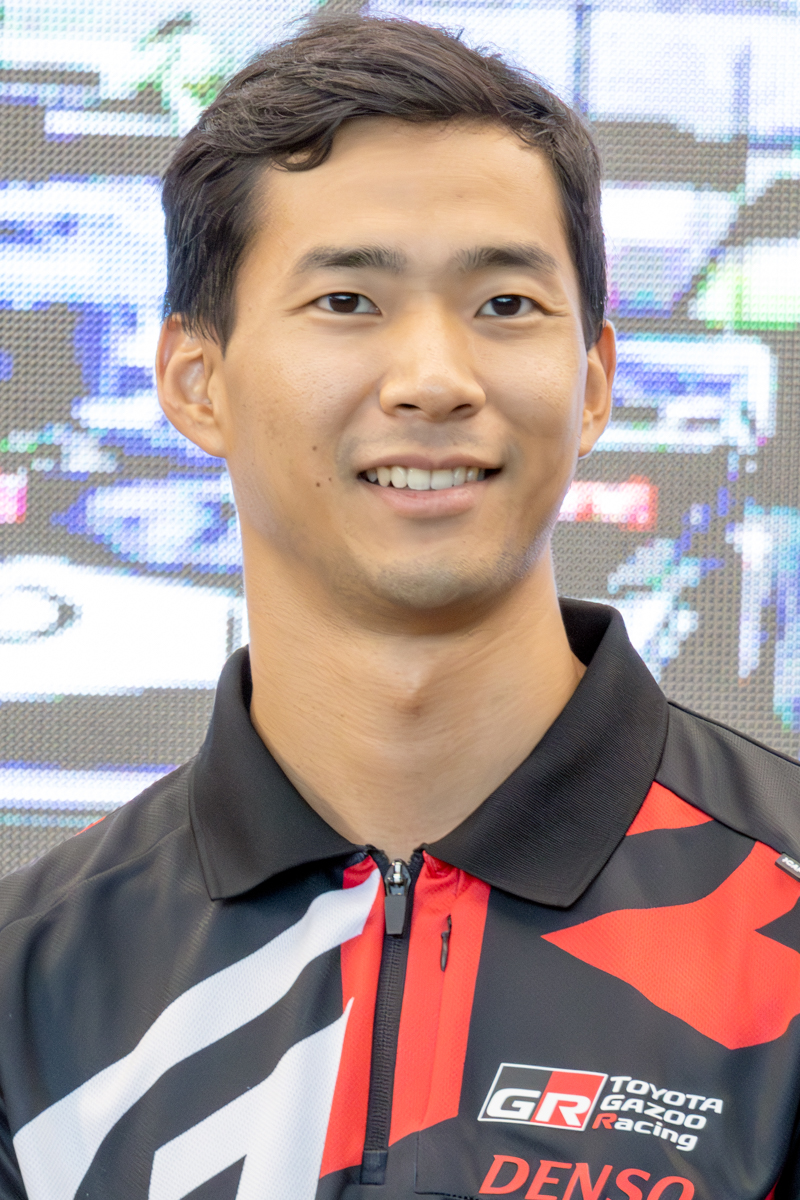
Ryō Hirakawa

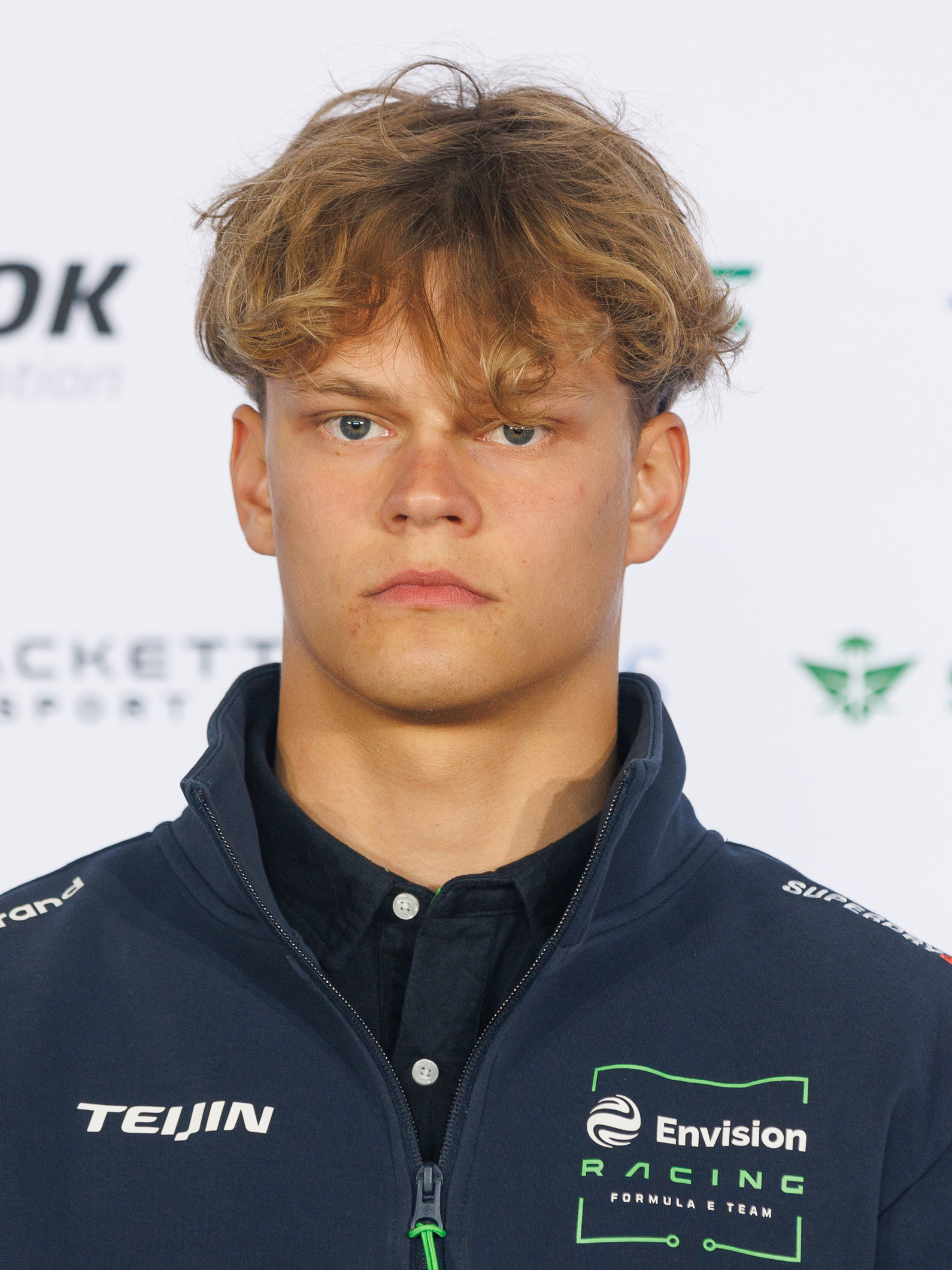
Paul Aron

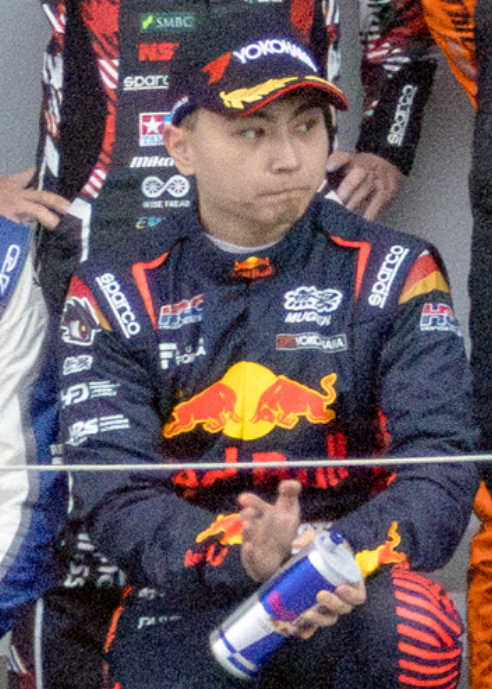
Ayumu Iwasa

Arvid Lindblad, Jak Crawford, and the seven drivers pictured above drove during the first free practice session, with Fuoco and Crawford making their Formula One practice debuts.

The drivers and teams were the same as published in the season entry list with two exceptions; Yuki Tsunoda at Red Bull Racing held the seat originally occupied by Liam Lawson before Lawson was demoted back to Racing Bulls from the Japanese Grand Prix onward, and Franco Colapinto replaced Jack Doohan at Alpine from the Emilia Romagna Grand Prix onward on a race-by-race basis.

During the first practice session, nine teams fielded alternate drivers who had not raced in more than two Grands Prix, as required by the Formula One regulations:

- Patricio O'Ward for McLaren in place of Lando Norris.
- Frederik Vesti for Mercedes in place of George Russell.
- Antonio Fuoco for Ferrari in place of Lewis Hamilton.
- Arvid Lindblad for Red Bull in place of Max Verstappen.
- Luke Browning for Williams in place of Carlos Sainz Jr.
- Jak Crawford for Aston Martin in place of Lance Stroll.
- Ryō Hirakawa for Haas in place of Oliver Bearman.
- Paul Aron for Alpine in place of Pierre Gasly.
- Ayumu Iwasa for Racing Bulls in place of Liam Lawson.

Fuoco and Crawford made their Formula One practice debuts.

=== Tyre choices ===
Tyre supplier Pirelli brought the C2, C4, and C5 tyre compounds designated hard, medium, and soft, respectively, for teams to use at the event.

=== Penalties ===
Carlos Sainz Jr. of Williams carried a five-place grid penalty for causing a collision with Mercedes driver Kimi Antonelli at the preceding United States Grand Prix.

== Practice ==
Three free practice sessions were held for the event. The first free practice session was held on 24 October 2025, at 12:30 local time (UTC–6), and was topped by Charles Leclerc ahead of Kimi Antonelli and Nico Hülkenberg. The second free practice session was held on the same day, at 16:00 local time, and was topped by Max Verstappen ahead of Leclerc and Antonelli. The third practice session was held on 25 October 2025, at 11:30 local time, and was topped by Lando Norris ahead of Lewis Hamilton and George Russell.

== Qualifying ==
Qualifying was held on 25 October 2025, at 15:00 local time (UTC–6), and determined the starting grid order for the race.

=== Qualifying report ===
Q1 saw Gabriel Bortoleto, Alexander Albon, Pierre Gasly, Lance Stroll, and Franco Colapinto eliminated. Yuki Tsunoda, Esteban Ocon, Nico Hulkenberg, Fernando Alonso, and Liam Lawson were eliminated in Q2. Lando Norris took pole position, 0.262 seconds ahead of Charles Leclerc in second. Norris' title rivals Verstappen and Piastri qualified in fifth and eighth respectively. Piastri's starting position was seventh after Carlos Sainz Jr.'s 5-place grid penalty was applied.

=== Qualifying classification ===
| Pos. | No. | Driver | Constructor | Qualifying times | | | Final grid |
| Pos. | No. | Driver | Constructor | Q1 | Q2 | Q3 | Final grid |
|---|---|---|---|---|---|---|---|
| 1 | 4 | (United Kingdom) Lando Norris | McLaren-Mercedes | 1:16.899 | 1:16.252 | 1:15.586 | 1 |
| 2 | 16 | (Monaco) Charles Leclerc | Ferrari | 1:17.024 | 1:16.658 | 1:15.848 | 2 |
| 3 | 44 | (United Kingdom) Lewis Hamilton | Ferrari | 1:16.736 | 1:16.458 | 1:15.938 | 3 |
| 4 | 63 | (United Kingdom) George Russell | Mercedes | 1:16.895 | 1:16.537 | 1:16.034 | 4 |
| 5 | 1 | (Netherlands) Max Verstappen | Red Bull Racing-Honda RBPT | 1:17.076 | 1:16.605 | 1:16.070 | 5 |
| 6 | 12 | (Italy) Kimi Antonelli | Mercedes | 1:17.291 | 1:16.773 | 1:16.118 | 6 |
| 7 | 55 | (Spain) Carlos Sainz Jr. | Williams-Mercedes | 1:17.171 | 1:16.607 | 1:16.172 | 12^{1} |
| 8 | 81 | (Australia) Oscar Piastri | McLaren-Mercedes | 1:17.158 | 1:16.737 | 1:16.174 | 7 |
| 9 | 6 | (France) Isack Hadjar | Racing Bulls-Honda RBPT | 1:16.733 | 1:16.804 | 1:16.252 | 8 |
| 10 | 87 | (United Kingdom) Oliver Bearman | Haas-Ferrari | 1:17.040 | 1:16.787 | 1:16.460 | 9 |
| 11 | 22 | (Japan) Yuki Tsunoda | Red Bull Racing-Honda RBPT | 1:17.234 | 1:16.816 | N/A | 10 |
| 12 | 31 | (France) Esteban Ocon | Haas-Ferrari | 1:16.948 | 1:16.837 | N/A | 11 |
| 13 | 27 | (Germany) Nico Hülkenberg | Kick Sauber-Ferrari | 1:17.251 | 1:17.016 | N/A | 13 |
| 14 | 14 | (Spain) Fernando Alonso | Aston Martin Aramco-Mercedes | 1:17.232 | 1:17.103 | N/A | 14 |
| 15 | 30 | (New Zealand) Liam Lawson | Racing Bulls-Honda RBPT | 1:16.961 | 1:18.072 | N/A | 15 |
| 16 | 5 | (Brazil) Gabriel Bortoleto | Kick Sauber-Ferrari | 1:17.412 | N/A | N/A | 16 |
| 17 | 23 | (Thailand) Alexander Albon | Williams-Mercedes | 1:17.490 | N/A | N/A | 17 |
| 18 | 10 | (France) Pierre Gasly | Alpine-Renault | 1:17.546 | N/A | N/A | 18 |
| 19 | 18 | (Canada) Lance Stroll | Aston Martin Aramco-Mercedes | 1:17.606 | N/A | N/A | 19 |
| 20 | 43 | (Argentina) Franco Colapinto | Alpine-Renault | 1:17.670 | N/A | N/A | 20 |
107% time: 1:22.104

Notes

- ^1 – Carlos Sainz Jr. received a five-place grid penalty for causing a collision with Kimi Antonelli at the preceding United States Grand Prix.

== Race ==
The race was held on 26 October 2025, at 14:00 local time (UTC–6), and was run for 71 laps.

=== Race report ===
Polesitter Lando Norris had a good start. Going into the first turn, four cars - Norris' McLaren, the two Ferraris of Charles Leclerc and Lewis Hamilton, and Max Verstappen's Red Bull - all briefly went into the corner together, with Verstappen pushed into the grass. Verstappen drove around the first three turns as a result. Leclerc briefly gained a position to lead the race, but cut the track and had to give the position back. Mercedes' Kimi Antonelli and George Russell both lost a position on the opening lap. Norris' teammate Oscar Piastri had a bad start and dropped from seventh to ninth. Liam Lawson was hit by Carlos Sainz Jr. in the Williams and retired the Racing Bulls car shortly after. Verstappen then battled Hamilton, with Hamilton and Verstappen going side by side through turns 1 and 2. Verstappen then cut the third corner. Verstappen slowed to allow Hamtilon back in front at turn 4, with Russell on the outside. Hamilton braked too late and locked up, choosing to cut turns four and five; Hamilton received a ten-second time penalty for leaving the track and gaining an advantage. Hamilton served the penalty, dropping him out of podium contention from his starting position of third. Haas driver Oliver Bearman, who started ninth, took advantage of Verstappen and Hamilton's fight and slid up to fourth. Russell lost positions after the incident with Verstappen and Hamilton and ended up behind his teammate Antonelli, and Mercedes swapped their drivers for Russell to chase down Bearman. Piastri put the pressure on Russell, and he eventually made it past the Mercedes. Russell gave back the position to Antonelli after the unsuccessful overtake attempt on Bearman, and both of them were passed by Piastri.

Some time later, Nico Hülkenberg and Fernando Alonso retired their Sauber and Aston Martin cars, respectively, due to mechanical issues. Contact with Lawson earlier in the race broke Sainz's tyre speed monitor; due to reporting the incorrect speed, he was caught speeding in the pit lane twice. He was given a five-second time penalty the first time, and a drive-through penalty the second time. Following the late-stage pit stops, Verstappen made his way up to third and Piastri, in fifth, attempted to close up to Bearman, who was in fourth. In the closing laps, Verstappen chased Leclerc for second place on a new set of soft tyres while Leclerc remained on the medium tyres. Sainz brought out the late virtual safety car period: he spun at the stadium section, and attempted to reverse the car into a safe spot, but his car began to smoke, facilitating the virtual safety car. The virtual safety car period ended on the last lap, and Verstappen could not pass Leclerc for second.

Norris won his sixth race of the season, with a gap of more than thirty seconds to Leclerc and Verstappen, who finished second and third, respectively. Oliver Bearman finished in fourth, which recorded Haas' joint-best finish of fourth, tied with Romain Grosjean in 2018. Oscar Piastri, Kimi Antonelli, George Russell, Lewis Hamilton, Esteban Ocon, and Gabriel Bortoleto completed the top ten points finishers. Norris took the lead of the championship by one point with 357 points, ahead of teammate Piastri with 356 points. Verstappen remained third in the fight for the Drivers' Championship with 321 points.

=== Race classification ===
| Pos. | No. | Driver | Constructor | Laps | Time/Retired | Grid | Points |
|---|---|---|---|---|---|---|---|
| 1 | 4 | (United Kingdom) Lando Norris | McLaren-Mercedes | 71 | 1:37:58.574 | 1 | 25 |
| 2 | 16 | (Monaco) Charles Leclerc | Ferrari | 71 | +30.324 | 2 | 18 |
| 3 | 1 | (Netherlands) Max Verstappen | Red Bull Racing-Honda RBPT | 71 | +31.049 | 5 | 15 |
| 4 | 87 | (United Kingdom) Oliver Bearman | Haas-Ferrari | 71 | +40.955 | 9 | 12 |
| 5 | 81 | (Australia) Oscar Piastri | McLaren-Mercedes | 71 | +42.065 | 7 | 10 |
| 6 | 12 | (Italy) Kimi Antonelli | Mercedes | 71 | +47.837 | 6 | 8 |
| 7 | 63 | (United Kingdom) George Russell | Mercedes | 71 | +50.287 | 4 | 6 |
| 8 | 44 | (United Kingdom) Lewis Hamilton | Ferrari | 71 | +56.446 | 3 | 4 |
| 9 | 31 | (France) Esteban Ocon | Haas-Ferrari | 71 | +1:15.464 | 11 | 2 |
| 10 | 5 | (Brazil) Gabriel Bortoleto | Kick Sauber-Ferrari | 71 | +1:16.863 | 16 | 1 |
| 11 | 22 | (Japan) Yuki Tsunoda | Red Bull Racing-Honda RBPT | 71 | +1:19.048 | 10 | |
| 12 | 23 | (Thailand) Alexander Albon | Williams-Mercedes | 70 | +1 lap | 17 | |
| 13 | 6 | (France) Isack Hadjar | Racing Bulls-Honda RBPT | 70 | +1 lap | 8 | |
| 14 | 18 | (Canada) Lance Stroll | Aston Martin Aramco-Mercedes | 70 | +1 lap | 19 | |
| 15 | 10 | (France) Pierre Gasly | Alpine-Renault | 70 | +1 lap | 18 | |
| 16 | 43 | (Argentina) Franco Colapinto | Alpine-Renault | 70 | +1 lap | 20 | |
| 17^{1} | 55 | (Spain) Carlos Sainz Jr. | Williams-Mercedes | 67 | Accident | 12 | |
| Ret | 14 | (Spain) Fernando Alonso | Aston Martin Aramco-Mercedes | 34 | Brakes | 14 | |
| Ret | 27 | (Germany) Nico Hülkenberg | Kick Sauber-Ferrari | 25 | Handling | 13 | |
| Ret | 30 | (New Zealand) Liam Lawson | Racing Bulls-Honda RBPT | 5 | Collision damage | 15 | |

Notes

- ^1 – Carlos Sainz Jr. was classified as he completed more than 90% of the race distance.

== Championship standings after the race ==
Drivers' Championship standings

| | Pos. | Driver | Points |
|---|---|---|---|
| 1 | 1 | (United Kingdom) **Lando Norris*** | 357 |
| 1 | 2 | (Australia) **Oscar Piastri*** | 356 |
| | 3 | (Netherlands) **Max Verstappen*** | 321 |
| | 4 | (United Kingdom) **George Russell*** | 258 |
| | 5 | (Monaco) Charles Leclerc | 210 |

Constructors' Championship standings

| | Pos. | Constructor | Points |
|---|---|---|---|
| | 1 | (United Kingdom) **McLaren-Mercedes*** | 713 |
| 1 | 2 | (Italy) Ferrari | 356 |
| 1 | 3 | (Germany) Mercedes | 355 |
| | 4 | (Austria) Red Bull Racing-Honda RBPT | 346 |
| | 5 | (United Kingdom) Williams-Mercedes | 111 |

- Note: Only the top five positions are included for both sets of standings.
- Competitor marked in bold and with an asterisk still has a theoretical chance of becoming World Champion.

| Previous race: 2025 United States Grand Prix | FIA Formula One World Championship; 2025 season | Next race: 2025 São Paulo Grand Prix |
| Previous race: 2024 Mexico City Grand Prix | Mexico City Grand Prix | Next race: 2026 Mexico City Grand Prix |
