= 2025 United States Grand Prix =

Nineteenth round of the 2025 F1 season

Race 19 of 24 in the 2025 Formula One World Championship
← Previous race	Next race →
- Layout of the Circuit of the Americas

Race details
- Date: October 19, 2025
- Official name: Formula 1 MSC Cruises United States Grand Prix 2025
- Location: Circuit of the Americas; Austin, Texas, United States
- Course: Permanent racing facility
- Course length: 5.513 km (3.426 miles)
- Distance: 56 laps, 308.405 km (191.634 miles)
- Weather: Sunny

Pole position
Driver	(Netherlands) Max Verstappen	Red Bull Racing-Honda RBPT
- Time: 1:32.510

Fastest lap
Driver	(Italy) Kimi Antonelli	Mercedes
- Time: 1:37.577 on lap 33

Podium
First	(Netherlands) Max Verstappen	Red Bull Racing-Honda RBPT
Second	(United Kingdom) Lando Norris	McLaren-Mercedes
Third	(Monaco) Charles Leclerc	Ferrari

The 2025 United States Grand Prix (officially known as the Formula 1 MSC Cruises United States Grand Prix 2025) was a Formula One motor race held on October 19, 2025, at the Circuit of the Americas in Austin, Texas, United States. It was the nineteenth round of the 2025 Formula One World Championship and the fourth of six Grands Prix in the season to utilise the sprint format. Max Verstappen of Red Bull won from pole position in both the sprint and main race. McLaren drivers and championship contenders Oscar Piastri and Lando Norris both retired in the sprint, and finished in fifth and second for the Grand Prix, respectively, with Norris finishing ahead of Charles Leclerc in the Ferrari.

The result meant that Norris closed the gap to Piastri to 14 points. Following his second victory in the last three races, Verstappen retained third, 40 points behind Piastri in the standings, whilst Mercedes, Ferrari and Red Bull were separated by just ten points heading into the next round in Mexico.

== Background ==
The event was held at the Circuit of the Americas in Austin, Texas, for the 13th time in the circuit's history, across the weekend of October 17–19, 2025. The Grand Prix was the nineteenth round of the 2025 Formula One World Championship and the 46th running of the United States Grand Prix as a round of the Formula One World Championship. It was also the fourth of six Grands Prix in the season to utilise the sprint format and the third time overall that the United States Grand Prix featured it.

=== Championship standings before the race ===
Going into the weekend, Oscar Piastri led the Drivers' Championship with 336 points, 22 points ahead of Lando Norris in second, and 63 points ahead of Max Verstappen. McLaren, who had won the Constructors' Championship at the preceding Singapore Grand Prix, were ahead of Mercedes and Ferrari, who were second and third with 325 and 298 points, respectively.

=== Entrants ===
The drivers and teams were the same as published in the season entry list with two exceptions; Yuki Tsunoda at Red Bull Racing held the seat originally held by Liam Lawson before Lawson was demoted back to Racing Bulls from the Japanese Grand Prix onward, and Franco Colapinto replaced Jack Doohan at Alpine from the Emilia Romagna Grand Prix onward on a race-by-race basis.

=== Tyre choices ===
Tyre supplier Pirelli brought the C1, C3, and C4 tyre compounds (designated hard, medium, and soft, respectively) for teams to use at the event.

=== Weather forecast ===
Ahead of the weekend, the Fédération Internationale de l'Automobile (FIA) received a forecast predicting that the heat index would be greater than 31 °C (88 °F) at some time during the sprint and the race. As a result, the FIA declared a "heat hazard"; in these conditions, teams may either equip their drivers with cooling systems, with the minimum weight limit being raised by 5 kilograms (11 lb) to compensate for the equipment, or add additional 0.5 kilograms (1 lb) of ballast in the cockpit. This change was introduced in 2025 to prevent driver overheating, as observed during the 2023 Qatar Grand Prix, and was used for the second time in the season following the preceding Singapore Grand Prix.

== Practice ==
The sole free practice session was held on October 17, 2025, at 12:30 local time (UTC–5), and was topped by Lando Norris ahead of Nico Hülkenberg and Norris' teammate Oscar Piastri. Charles Leclerc had a gearbox issue.

== Sprint qualifying ==
Sprint qualifying was held on October 17, 2025, at 16:30 local time (UTC–5), and determined the starting grid order for the sprint.

=== Sprint qualifying report ===
It consisted of three sessions, with the five drivers with the worst lap times being eliminated following each of the first two sessions. During the twelve minutes long first session (SQ1), Haas drivers Oliver Bearman and Esteban Ocon were eliminated, in addition to Franco Colapinto, Yuki Tsunoda, and Gabriel Bortoleto, the latter of whom failed to set a legal lap time.

The second session (SQ2), which lasted for ten minutes, Kimi Antonelli, Isack Hadjar, Pierre Gasly, Lance Stroll and Liam Lawson; Lawson did not set a legal lap time during the session.

The third session (SQ3) lasted for eight minutes, and determined the final order of the remaining ten drivers. Max Verstappen finished the session in first, with a lap time of 1:32.143. Lando Norris finished in second, 0.071 seconds behind Verstappen, with teammate Oscar Piastri finishing in third with a time of 1:32.523. Nico Hülkenberg, who recorded his highest starting position of the season, and George Russell finished in fourth and fifth. Fernando Alonso, Carlos Sainz Jr., Lewis Hamilton, Alexander Albon, and Charles Leclerc completed the rest of the top ten.

=== Sprint qualifying classification ===
Pos.	No.	Driver	Constructor	Qualifying times			Sprint grid
Pos.	No.	Driver	Constructor	SQ1	SQ2	SQ3	Sprint grid
1	1	(Netherlands) Max Verstappen	Red Bull Racing-Honda RBPT	1:33.363	1:33.163	1:32.143	1
2	4	(United Kingdom) Lando Norris	McLaren-Mercedes	1:33.224	1:33.033	1:32.214	2
3	81	(Australia) Oscar Piastri	McLaren-Mercedes	1:33.889	1:33.371	1:32.523	3
4	27	(Germany) Nico Hülkenberg	Kick Sauber-Ferrari	1:34.236	1:33.577	1:32.645	4
5	63	(United Kingdom) George Russell	Mercedes	1:34.653	1:33.462	1:32.888	5
6	14	(Spain) Fernando Alonso	Aston Martin Aramco-Mercedes	1:34.737	1:33.951	1:32.910	6
7	55	(Spain) Carlos Sainz Jr.	Williams-Mercedes	1:34.239	1:33.652	1:32.911	7
8	44	(United Kingdom) Lewis Hamilton	Ferrari	1:34.226	1:34.012	1:33.035	8
9	23	(Thailand) Alexander Albon	Williams-Mercedes	1:34.472	1:33.831	1:33.099	9
10	16	(Monaco) Charles Leclerc	Ferrari	1:34.913	1:33.938	1:33.104	10
11	12	(Italy) Kimi Antonelli	Mercedes	1:34.414	1:34.018	N/A	11
12	6	(France) Isack Hadjar	Racing Bulls-Honda RBPT	1:34.243	1:34.241	N/A	12
13	10	(France) Pierre Gasly	Alpine-Renault	1:35.144	1:34.258	N/A	13
14	18	(Canada) Lance Stroll	Aston Martin Aramco-Mercedes	1:34.988	1:34.394	N/A	14
15	30	(New Zealand) Liam Lawson	Racing Bulls-Honda RBPT	1:34.603	No time	N/A	15
16	87	(United Kingdom) Oliver Bearman	Haas-Ferrari	1:35.159	N/A	N/A	16
17	43	(Argentina) Franco Colapinto	Alpine-Renault	1:35.246	N/A	N/A	17
18	22	(Japan) Yuki Tsunoda	Red Bull Racing-Honda RBPT	1:35.259	N/A	N/A	18
19	31	(France) Esteban Ocon	Haas-Ferrari	1:36.003	N/A	N/A	19
107% time: 1:39.749
—	5	(Brazil) Gabriel Bortoleto	Kick Sauber-Ferrari	No time	N/A	N/A	20^{1}

Notes

- ^1 – Gabriel Bortoleto failed to set a time during sprint qualifying. He was permitted to race in the sprint at the stewards' discretion.

== Sprint ==
The sprint was held on October 18, 2025, at 12:00 local time (UTC–5), and was run for 19 laps.

=== Sprint report ===
At the first corner, Oscar Piastri of McLaren attempted a switchback maneuver on teammate Norris, only to collide with the Sauber of Nico Hülkenberg on his inside. This contact pushed Piastri into the side of Norris. The collision resulted in Piastri receiving suspension damage and pulling over to the side of the track, and Norris retiring with his left rear wheel coming off. Fernando Alonso's Aston Martin ended up with collateral damage, and Hülkenberg's front wing would be ripped off shortly afterward. Alonso also retired on lap one. In the chaos, Yuki Tsunoda and Gabriel Bortoleto avoided the collisions to go from eighteenth to seventh and twentieth to eleventh, respectively. Other drivers, including Carlos Sainz Jr. and the Ferrari cars of Lewis Hamilton, and Charles Leclerc, also benefited from the incident moving up the order.

On lap 17, Lance Stroll of Aston Martin struck Esteban Ocon's Haas while attempting an overtake, again at turn one, causing both drivers to retire with damage. Stroll received a five-place grid penalty for causing a collision. With Ocon's retirement bringing out another safety car that lasted until the end, Max Verstappen, who led since the first lap, won the sprint from pole position ahead of George Russell. Due to the retirement of both McLarens, Carlos Sainz Jr. was elevated to third, scoring his and his team's first sprint podium.

=== Sprint classification ===
Pos.	No.	Driver	Constructor	Laps	Time/Retired	Grid	Points
1	1	(Netherlands) Max Verstappen	Red Bull Racing-Honda RBPT	19	37:58.229	1	8
2	63	(United Kingdom) George Russell	Mercedes	19	+0.395	5	7
3	55	(Spain) Carlos Sainz Jr.	Williams-Mercedes	19	+0.791	7	6
4	44	(United Kingdom) Lewis Hamilton	Ferrari	19	+1.224	8	5
5	16	(Monaco) Charles Leclerc	Ferrari	19	+1.825	10	4
6	23	(Thailand) Alexander Albon	Williams-Mercedes	19	+2.576	9	3
7	22	(Japan) Yuki Tsunoda	Red Bull Racing-Honda RBPT	19	+2.976	18	2
8	12	(Italy) Kimi Antonelli	Mercedes	19	+4.147	11	1
9	30	(New Zealand) Liam Lawson	Racing Bulls-Honda RBPT	19	+4.804	15	
10	10	(France) Pierre Gasly	Alpine-Renault	19	+5.126	13	
11	5	(Brazil) Gabriel Bortoleto	Kick Sauber-Ferrari	19	+5.649	20	
12	6	(France) Isack Hadjar	Racing Bulls-Honda RBPT	19	+6.228	12	
13	27	(Germany) Nico Hülkenberg	Kick Sauber-Ferrari	19	+6.624	4	
14	43	(Argentina) Franco Colapinto	Alpine-Renault	19	+8.006	17	
15	87	(United Kingdom) Oliver Bearman	Haas-Ferrari	19	+13.576^{1}	16	
Ret	18	(Canada) Lance Stroll	Aston Martin Aramco-Mercedes	15	Collision/Suspension Damage	19	
Ret	31	(France) Esteban Ocon	Haas-Ferrari	15	Collision	14	
Ret	81	(Australia) Oscar Piastri	McLaren-Mercedes	0	Collision/Suspension Damage	3	
Ret	14	(Spain) Fernando Alonso	Aston Martin Aramco-Mercedes	0	Collision	6	
Ret	4	(United Kingdom) Lando Norris	McLaren-Mercedes	0	Collision/Ripped Wheel	2	

Notes

- ^1 – Oliver Bearman finished eighth, but received a ten-second time penalty for leaving the track and gaining an advantage.

== Qualifying ==
Qualifying was held on October 18, 2025, at 16:00 local time (UTC–5), and determined the starting grid order for the main race.

=== Qualifying report ===
A red flag was flown after Isack Hadjar of Racing Bulls crashed out in Q1. Gabriel Bortoleto, Esteban Ocon, Lance Stroll, Alexander Albon and the stricken Hadjar were the first five to be eliminated. Franco Colapinto was initially eliminated in Q1, but was reprieved by Albon having his best lap deleted for a track limits violation. Nico Hulkenberg was unable to replicate his sprint qualifying result and was knocked out in Q2, along with Liam Lawson, Yuki Tsunoda, and the two Alpine cars of Pierre Gasly and Colapinto.

Max Verstappen took his 47th career pole position with only one run in Q3, as Red Bull misjudged the time needed to exit the pits and start his final flying lap. Lando Norris joined him on the front row, 0.291 seconds adrift, with Charles Leclerc, George Russell and Lewis Hamilton completing the top five. Championship leader Oscar Piastri qualified sixth.

=== Qualifying classification ===
Pos.	No.	Driver	Constructor	Qualifying times			Final grid
Pos.	No.	Driver	Constructor	Q1	Q2	Q3	Final grid
1	1	(Netherlands) Max Verstappen	Red Bull Racing-Honda RBPT	1:33.207	1:32.701	1:32.510	1
2	4	(United Kingdom) Lando Norris	McLaren-Mercedes	1:33.843	1:32.876	1:32.801	2
3	16	(Monaco) Charles Leclerc	Ferrari	1:33.525	1:32.869	1:32.807	3
4	63	(United Kingdom) George Russell	Mercedes	1:33.311	1:33.058	1:32.826	4
5	44	(United Kingdom) Lewis Hamilton	Ferrari	1:33.685	1:32.914	1:32.912	5
6	81	(Australia) Oscar Piastri	McLaren-Mercedes	1:33.746	1:33.228	1:33.084	6
7	12	(Italy) Kimi Antonelli	Mercedes	1:33.501	1:33.044	1:33.114	7
8	87	(United Kingdom) Oliver Bearman	Haas-Ferrari	1:33.921	1:33.238	1:33.139	8
9	55	(Spain) Carlos Sainz Jr.	Williams-Mercedes	1:33.739	1:33.124	1:33.150	9
10	14	(Spain) Fernando Alonso	Aston Martin Aramco-Mercedes	1:33.741	1:33.237	1:33.160	10
11	27	(Germany) Nico Hülkenberg	Kick Sauber-Ferrari	1:33.551	1:33.334	N/A	11
12	30	(New Zealand) Liam Lawson	Racing Bulls-Honda RBPT	1:33.549	1:33.360	N/A	12
13	22	(Japan) Yuki Tsunoda	Red Bull Racing-Honda RBPT	1:33.935	1:33.466	N/A	13
14	10	(France) Pierre Gasly	Alpine-Renault	1:33.599	1:33.651	N/A	14
15	43	(Argentina) Franco Colapinto	Alpine-Renault	1:34.039	1:34.044	N/A	15
16	5	(Brazil) Gabriel Bortoleto	Kick Sauber-Ferrari	1:34.125	N/A	N/A	16
17	31	(France) Esteban Ocon	Haas-Ferrari	1:34.136	N/A	N/A	17
18	18	(Canada) Lance Stroll	Aston Martin Aramco-Mercedes	1:34.540	N/A	N/A	19^{1}
19	23	(Thailand) Alexander Albon	Williams-Mercedes	1:34.690	N/A	N/A	18
107% time: 1:39.731
—	6	(France) Isack Hadjar	Racing Bulls-Honda RBPT	No time	N/A	N/A	20^{2}

Notes

- ^1 – Lance Stroll received a five-place grid penalty for causing a collision with Esteban Ocon during the sprint.
- ^2 – Isack Hadjar failed to set a time during qualifying. He was permitted to race at the stewards' discretion.

== Race ==
The race was held on October 19, 2025, at 14:00 local time (UTC–5), and was run for 56 laps.

=== Race report ===
Polesitter Max Verstappen had a good launch and maintained his lead in the opening lap. Title contender Lando Norris qualified in second, but was quickly overtaken on the outside of turn 1 by Ferrari's Charles Leclerc, who opted for soft tyres at the start of the race. Leclerc was the only driver in the top 10 to start on softs. Further back, Gabriel Bortoleto and Alex Albon collided in the opening lap, with Albon's Williams spinning out and then returning to the track. The virtual safety car was deployed on lap 7 after Albon's teammate Carlos Sainz retired from the race following a collision with Antonelli, which the latter escaped without much damage.

Norris and Leclerc battled for second place until lap 21, when Norris took the place back from Leclerc. Leclerc regained second position after their teams' respective pit stops, with Ferrari successfully executing an undercut strategy. Norris made multiple unsuccessful overtake attempts, before he eventually made his way past the Ferrari in the closing laps. Max Verstappen achieved his 68th Grand Prix victory, his fourth in Austin, ahead of Lando Norris, who finished in second and Charles Leclerc in third, the Ferrari driver's sixth podium finish of the season. Lewis Hamilton finished in fourth ahead of Championship leader Oscar Piastri in fifth, with George Russell, Yuki Tsunoda, Nico Hulkenberg, Oliver Bearman, and Fernando Alonso completing the top ten points finishers.

=== Post-race ===
McLaren Team Principal Andrea Stella claimed that Norris had the race pace to challenge Verstappen for the win, but he was held back by his battle with Leclerc. Oscar Piastri retained his lead in the Drivers' Championship, but his nearest rival Lando Norris closed the gap to just 14 points. Max Verstappen trailed Piastri's lead by 40 points.The result saw Leclerc mathematically eliminated from championship contention. In the Constructors' Championship, McLaren extended their lead to 337 points after claiming its tenth Constructors' Championship at the previous round in Singapore. In the fight for second place in the Constructors' Championship, Mercedes, Red Bull and Ferrari were only separated by ten points following the conclusion of this round. Carlos Sainz was given a 5-place grid penalty for the succeeding Mexico City Grand Prix, as well as 2 penalty points for causing a collision in the incident with Antonelli.

=== Race classification ===
Pos.	No.	Driver	Constructor	Laps	Time/Retired	Grid	Points
1	1	(Netherlands) Max Verstappen	Red Bull Racing-Honda RBPT	56	1:34:00.161	1	25
2	4	(United Kingdom) Lando Norris	McLaren-Mercedes	56	+7.959	2	18
3	16	(Monaco) Charles Leclerc	Ferrari	56	+15.373	3	15
4	44	(United Kingdom) Lewis Hamilton	Ferrari	56	+28.536	5	12
5	81	(Australia) Oscar Piastri	McLaren-Mercedes	56	+29.678	6	10
6	63	(United Kingdom) George Russell	Mercedes	56	+33.456	4	8
7	22	(Japan) Yuki Tsunoda	Red Bull Racing-Honda RBPT	56	+52.714	13	6
8	27	(Germany) Nico Hülkenberg	Kick Sauber-Ferrari	56	+57.249	11	4
9	87	(United Kingdom) Oliver Bearman	Haas-Ferrari	56	+1:04.722	8	2
10	14	(Spain) Fernando Alonso	Aston Martin Aramco-Mercedes	56	+1:10.001	10	1
11	30	(New Zealand) Liam Lawson	Racing Bulls-Honda RBPT	56	+1:13.209	12	
12	18	(Canada) Lance Stroll	Aston Martin Aramco-Mercedes	56	+1:14.778	19	
13	12	(Italy) Kimi Antonelli	Mercedes	56	+1:15.746	7	
14	23	(Thailand) Alexander Albon	Williams-Mercedes	56	+1:20.000	18	
15	31	(France) Esteban Ocon	Haas-Ferrari	56	+1:23.043	17	
16	6	(France) Isack Hadjar	Racing Bulls-Honda RBPT	56	+1:32.807	20	
17	43	(Argentina) Franco Colapinto	Alpine-Renault	55	+1 lap	15	
18	5	(Brazil) Gabriel Bortoleto	Kick Sauber-Ferrari	55	+1 lap	16	
19	10	(France) Pierre Gasly	Alpine-Renault	55	+1 lap	14	
Ret	55	(Spain) Carlos Sainz Jr.	Williams-Mercedes	5	Collision damage	9	

== Championship standings after the race ==
Drivers' Championship standings

Pos.	Driver	Points
1	(Australia) **Oscar Piastri***	346
2	(United Kingdom) **Lando Norris***	332
3	(Netherlands) **Max Verstappen***	306
4	(United Kingdom) **George Russell***	252
5	(Monaco) Charles Leclerc	192

Constructors' Championship standings

Pos.	Constructor	Points
1	(United Kingdom) **McLaren-Mercedes***	678
2	(Germany) Mercedes	341
3	(Italy) Ferrari	334
4	(Austria) Red Bull Racing-Honda RBPT	331
5	(United Kingdom) Williams-Mercedes	111

- Note: Only the top five positions are included for both sets of standings.
- Competitor marked in bold and with an asterisk still has a theoretical chance of becoming World Champion.

Previous race: 2025 Singapore Grand Prix	FIA Formula One World Championship; 2025 season	Next race: 2025 Mexico City Grand Prix
Previous race: 2024 United States Grand Prix	United States Grand Prix	Next race: 2026 United States Grand Prix
