= Gabriel Bortoleto =

Brazilian racing driver (born 2004)

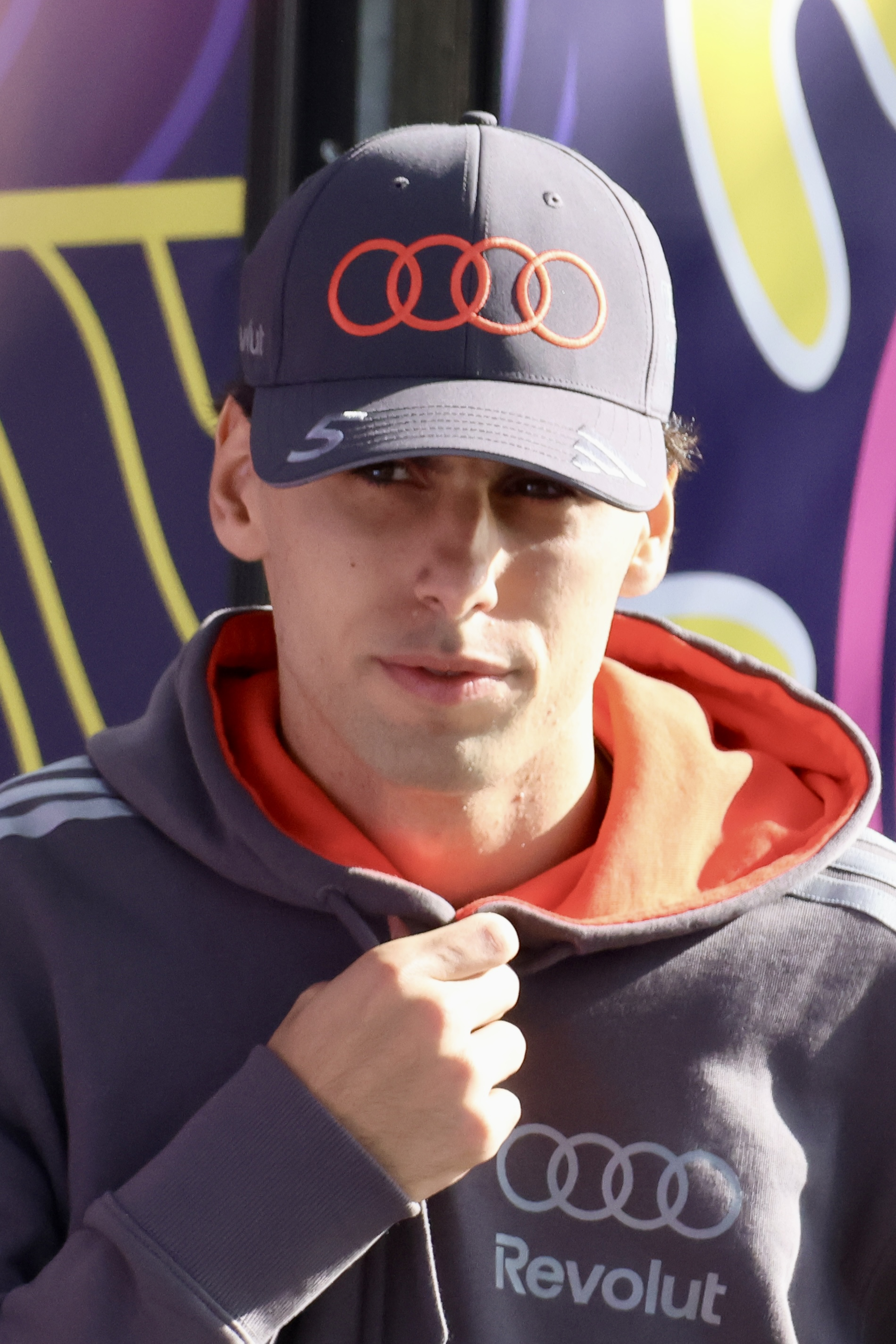
- Bortoleto in 2026
- Born: Gabriel Lourenzo Bortoleto Oliveira; 14 October 2004 (age 22); Osasco, São Paulo, Brazil

Formula One World Championship career
- Nationality: (Brazil) Brazilian
- 2026 team: Audi
- Car number: 5
- Entries: 44 (43 starts)
- Championships: 0
- Wins: 0
- Podiums: 0
- Career points: 33
- Pole positions: 0
- Fastest laps: 0
- First entry: 2025 Australian Grand Prix
- Last entry: 2026 São Paulo Grand Prix
- 2025 position: 19th (19 pts)

Previous series
- 2024; 2023; 2022; 2021–2022; 2020: FIA Formula 2; FIA Formula 3; FR Asian; FR European; Italian F4

Championship titles
- 2024; 2023: FIA Formula 2; FIA Formula 3

Awards
- 2024; 2024: FIA Rookie of the Year; Anthoine Hubert Award
- Website: gabrielbortoleto.com.br

Gabriel Lourenzo "Gabi" Bortoleto Oliveira (Brazilian Portuguese: [ɡabɾiˈɛw lo(w)ˈɾẽsu boɾtoˈletu oliˈve(j)ɾɐ]; born 14 October 2004) is a Brazilian racing driver who competes in Formula One for Audi.

Born and raised in Osasco, Bortoleto began competitive kart racing aged seven, winning multiple national titles and graduating to junior formulae in 2020. A protégé of two-time World Drivers' Champion Fernando Alonso, Bortoleto became a race-winner in Italian F4 and Formula Regional European, before winning his first title at the 2023 FIA Formula 3 Championship with Trident. Bortoleto progressed to FIA Formula 2 in 2024, winning the championship that year with Invicta to become the seventh driver in history to win the GP2/Formula 2 title in their rookie season; at the Monza feature race, Bortoleto became the first driver to win from last on the grid in either Formula 2 or Formula One.

A member of the McLaren Driver Development Programme from 2023 to 2024, Bortoleto joined Sauber for 2025, ahead of their acquisition by Audi in 2026; he achieved several points finishes in his rookie season. Bortoleto is contracted to remain at Audi until at least the end of the 2027 season.

== Early and personal life ==
Gabriel Lourenzo Bortoleto Oliveira was born on 14 October 2004 in Osasco, São Paulo, Brazil. His father, Lincoln Oliveira, is chief executive officer and co-owner of the Stock Car Pro Series in Brazil. He founded Americanet in 1996, which merged with Vero in 2023 to become one of the largest internet service providers in Brazil, with annual revenue of R$1.9 billion (US$380 million).

The family also operates KTF Sports, a Stock Car Pro Series and kart racing team. His older brother, Enzo, formerly competed in BRDC British Formula 3. Bortoleto is known as "Bibi" amongst his close friends. He is managed by A14 Management, a firm owned by Fernando Alonso, and his career is supported by Porto Seguro, O Boticário, Banco de Brasília, and Qualcomm Snapdragon. He has been dating computer science student Isabella Bernardini since 2020. His racing idol is Ayrton Senna.

== Junior racing career ==
=== Karting (2011–2019) ===
Bortoleto began karting in October 2011. Bortoleto started competing in the Campeonato Sulbrasileiro de Kart in 2012. At the age of eleven, he moved to Europe to pursue a racing career with support from his family. He remained in karts until 2019, with his most successful year being 2018, where he finished third in the European and World Championships in OK-Junior, and became vice-champion in both the WSK Super Master Series and the Andrea Margutti Trophy.

=== Formula 4 (2020) ===
Bortoleto made his car racing debut in the 2020 Italian F4 Championship, partnering Sebastián Montoya, Gabriele Minì and Dino Beganovic at Prema Powerteam. His first podium came at Mugello, where he scored second, third, and a victory, taking his first single-seater win in the fourth round of the season. He scored two more podiums in Monza and finished the season fifth in the overall championship, ahead of Montoya but behind Beganovic and eventual champion Minì. Bortoleto also finished fourth in the rookies' standings.

=== Formula Regional (2021–2022) ===
==== 2021: Rookie campaign and first podium ====
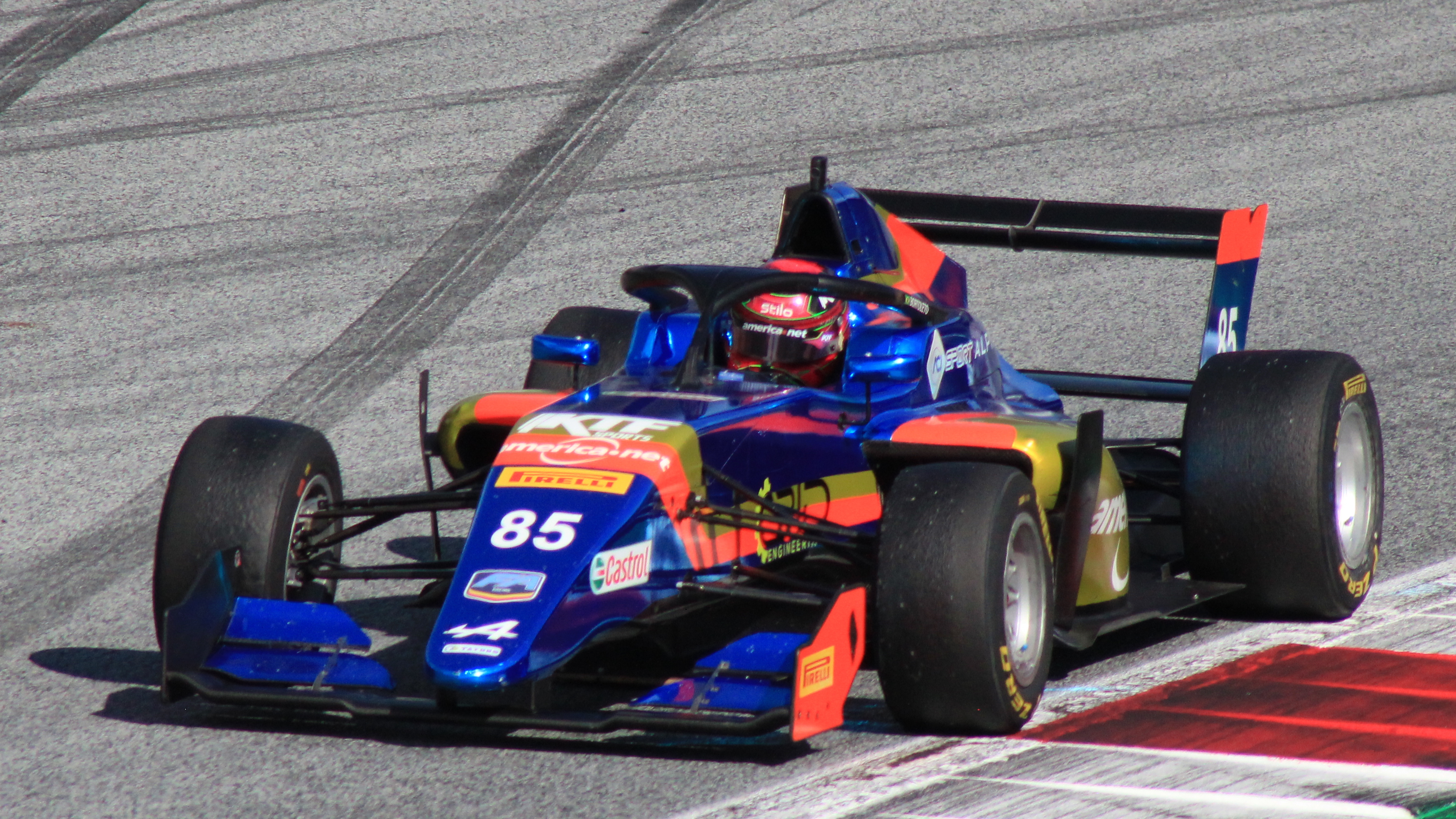
Bortoleto racing in the 2021 Formula Regional European Championship at the Red Bull Ring.

In March 2021, it was announced that Bortoleto would be making his debut in the Formula Regional European Championship with FA Racing, run by MP Motorsport. He scored his first points in the first race of the season in Imola, where he finished ninth. From there it took until the seventh round at the Red Bull Ring until Bortoleto scored again — this time claiming a podium in the second race. This began a run of top-ten finishes, resulting in 15th place in the standings at the end of the year.

==== 2022: Maiden victories with R-ace GP ====
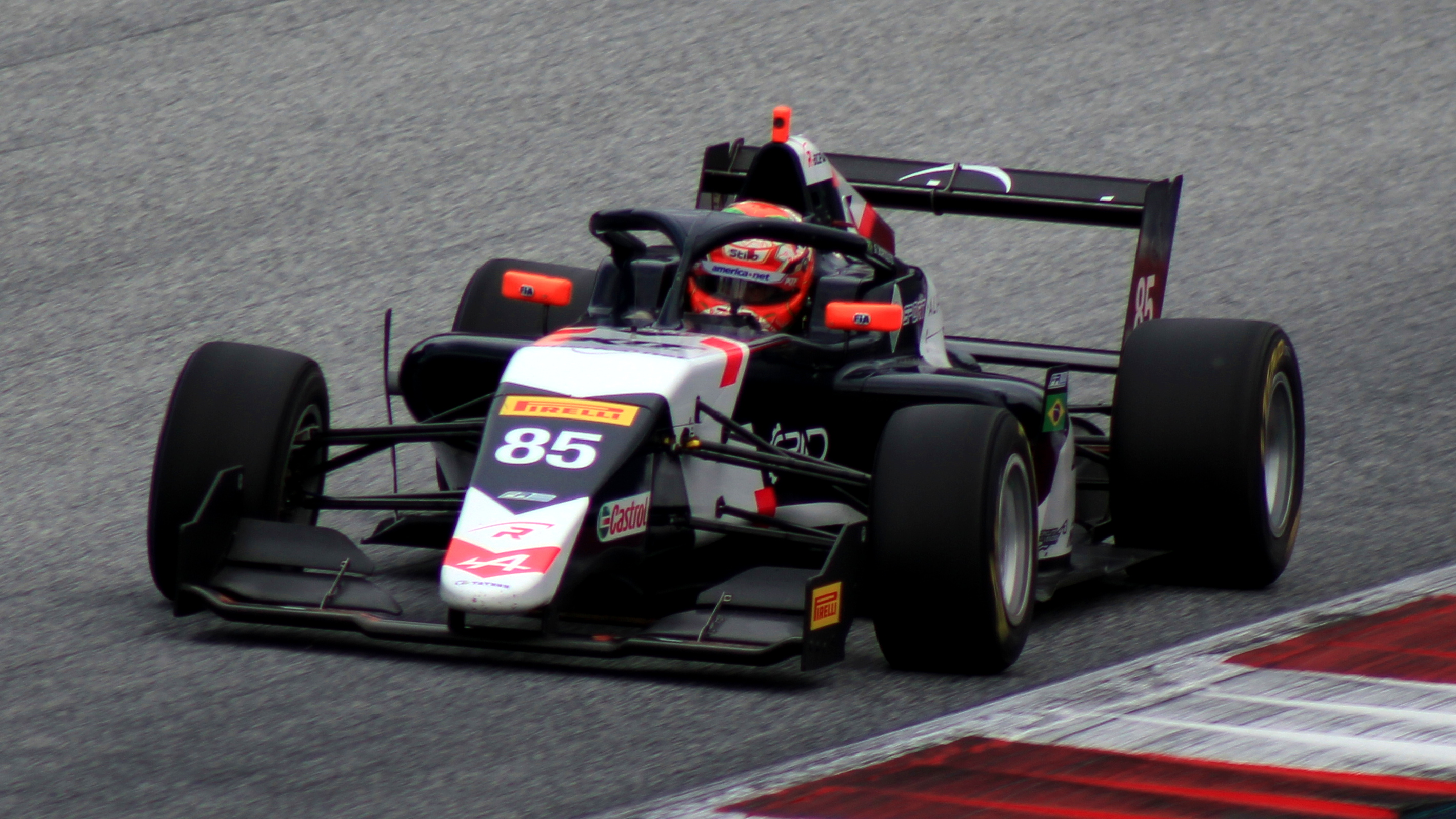
Bortoleto racing in the 2022 Formula Regional European Championship at the Red Bull Ring.

After competing for 3Y by R-ace GP in a partial campaign of the Formula Regional Asian Championship at the start of 2022, where he won in a reversed-top-ten race at Yas Marina, Bortoleto was announced to join R-ace GP ahead of the European Championship. While Bortoleto suffered with engine problems at times during the year, he managed to win at Spa, inheriting victory after teammate Hadrien David was penalised, and at Barcelona. He ended up sixth overall, being beaten by David but dispatching other teammate Lorenzo Fluxá.

=== FIA Formula 3 (2023) ===
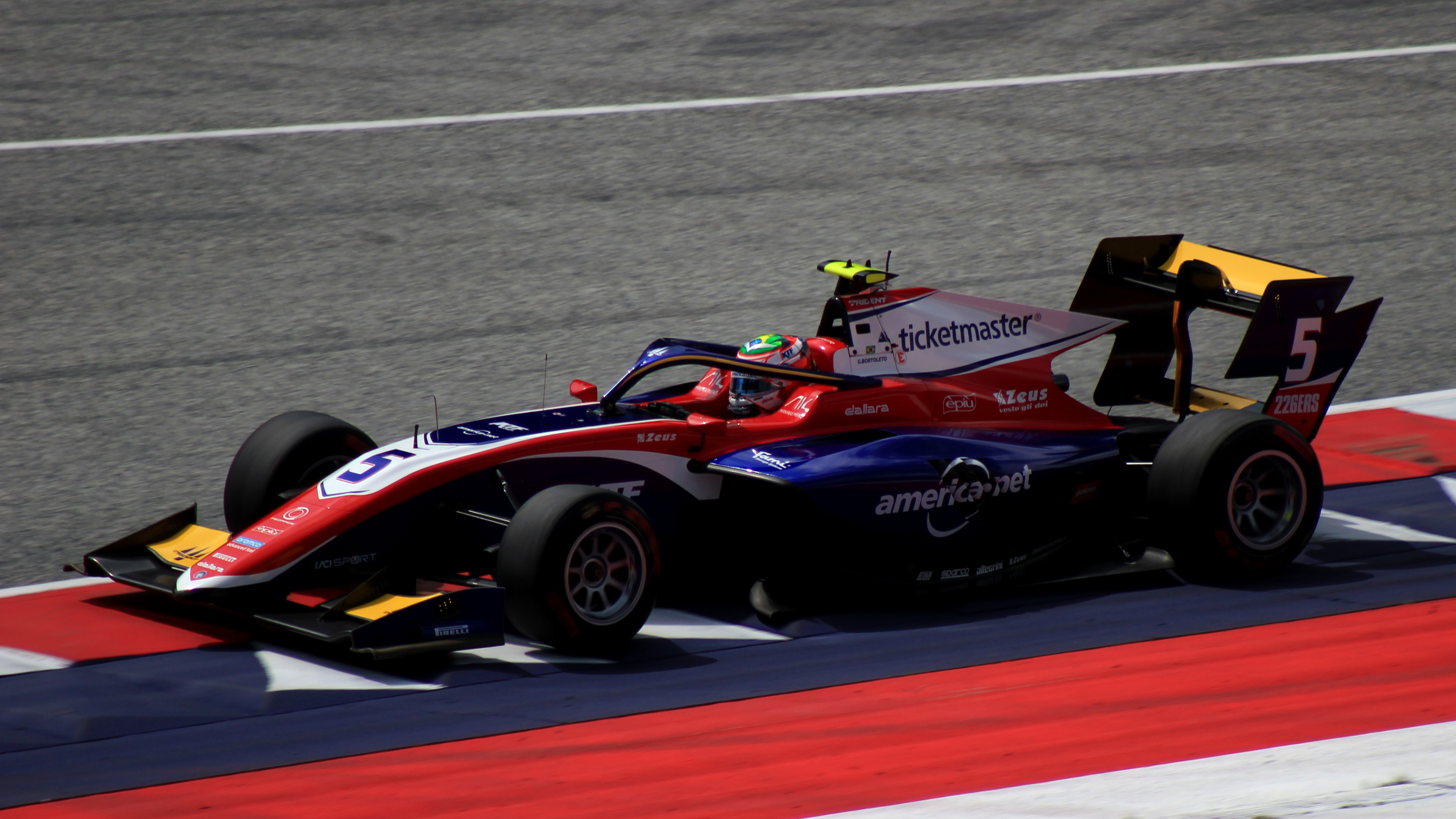
Bortoleto driving the Dallara F3 2019 during the 2023 Spielberg Formula 3 round

At the end of September, Bortoleto participated in the 2022 FIA Formula 3 post-season test at Jerez with Trident, partnering Oliver Goethe and Leonardo Fornaroli. Shortly afterwards, he was announced as a Trident driver for the 2023 FIA Formula 3 Championship, becoming the first driver to be announced to a team for that season.

In his first race at the Bahrain International Circuit, Bortoleto was penalised for causing a collision with Rafael Villagómez and was classified outside the points. This was followed by a victory in the following day's feature race when first-place finisher Gabriele Minì received a penalty. Having been elevated to an early championship lead, the Brazilian extended it at Albert Park by claiming pole position and a second consecutive feature race victory. He continued to score points in each race of the subsequent five rounds, even achieving a second place during the feature race at the Red Bull Ring and two runner-up finishes during the sprint races in Britain and Hungary.

Sitting on a comfortable lead at the top of the standings, Bortoleto would proceed to have his first non-scoring race of 2023 at Spa-Francorchamps, as a weak qualifying session was followed by contact caused by Dino Beganovic during Saturday's race, forcing the Brazilian to stop his car. Despite narrowly missing out on points in Sunday's race, a weak round from all of his immediate title rivals left Bortoleto with a 38-point advantage heading into the final round of the season. As Paul Aron and Pepe Martí missed out on pole position during Monza qualifying, Bortoleto was crowned FIA Formula 3 champion on Friday.

=== FIA Formula 2 (2024) ===
Bortoleto entered Formula 2 for his 2024 campaign, joining Invicta Racing alongside Alpine Academy driver Kush Maini. He began the season by qualifying second for the season opener in Bahrain but was promoted to pole position after Maini was disqualified for a technical infringement. He scored points in both races, despite making contact with and spinning around Isack Hadjar at the start of the feature race. At the next round in Jeddah Bortoleto qualified 15th, finished tenth in the sprint and retired on lap 1 of the feature race with a driveshaft failure. He also retired from the sprint race at Melbourne after being sent into the wall by Pepe Martí, who had been squeezed by Hadjar at the start, and also failed to finish the feature race due to a hydraulic failure.

Bortoleto bounced back by taking pole for the round in Imola and scoring his first points since Bahrain during the sprint, finishing sixth. Though he fell down to fourth at the start of Sunday's event, Bortoleto moved back to second after the pit stop phase; he chased down Hadjar but could not pass him before the race ended, claiming his first podium in F2 with second place. He then qualified ninth in Monaco and finished the sprint race in second, having started from the front row due to the reverse-top-ten format. He then finished the feature in eighth. More points followed in both Barcelona races, though Bortoleto was demoted from seventh to tenth in the feature after causing a collision with his teammate on the final lap.

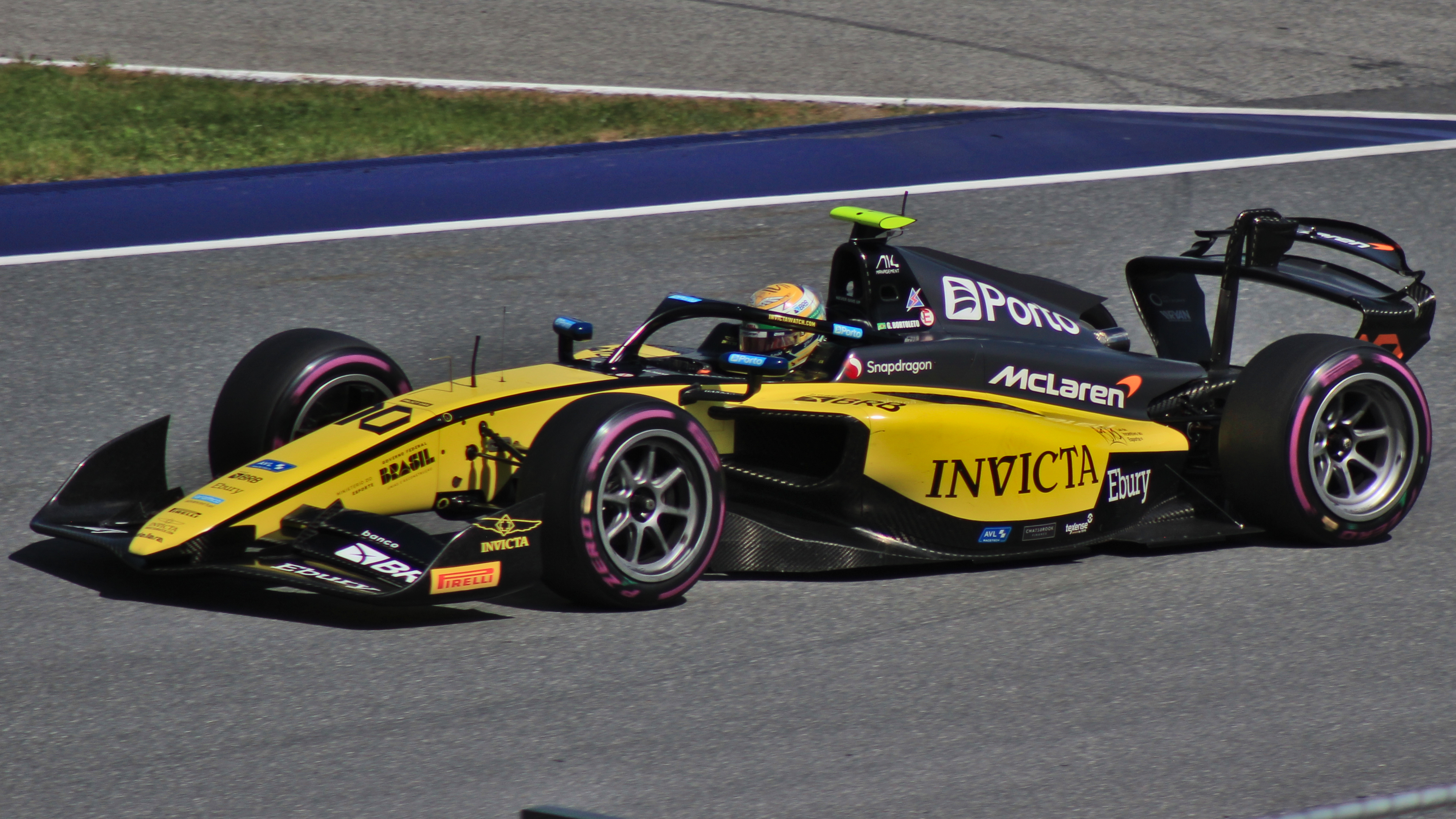
Bortoleto became the fourth driver to win FIA Formula 3 and FIA Formula 2 in successive years.

In Austria, Bortoleto qualified fourth and progressed from eighth to fourth during the sprint race, though he narrowly lost out on a podium to Paul Aron. On Sunday, Bortoleto passed race leader Joshua Dürksen on lap 4 and later overtook Martí, who had jumped him by pitting during a virtual safety car, to claim his maiden F2 victory and enter the top three in the championship. He progressed further with two points results at Silverstone but was penalised again due to a battle with Maini, this time being demoted from third to fourth after a last-lap overtake was judged to have happened off-track. In the Budapest sprint race Bortoleto struggled with tyre wear on his soft tyres, dropping to 16th, and finished fourth in the feature race after losing the podium to Richard Verschoor on the final lap. For the final round before the summer break in Belgium Bortoleto qualified second and fought for the victory with Hadjar, eventually ending up second and moving up to said place in the standings after a late technical issue ended Aron's race.

Bortoleto's start to the Monza round was a disaster: he spun in qualifying before setting a time, therefore necessitating a start from last place for both races. In the sprint race, Bortoleto charged through to eighth, sharing the final point with Dennis Hauger after crossing the finish line in a dead heat. It would however be the feature race where Bortoleto experienced his standout result of the entire year: he benefited from an opportune safety car, which, following his pit stop, allowed him to stay ahead of all drivers who had stopped prior to its deployment. Bortoleto drove out a gap to take a last-to-first victory and benefited from Hadjar's scoreless weekend to close up in the championship. He became the first driver to win from last on the grid in Formula 2. This performance later earned him the Mecachrome Outstanding Win Award at the end-of-year prize giving ceremony.

In the Baku round, Bortoleto finished the sprint race in fifth place and the main race in fourth, taking the lead in the drivers' championship by 4.5 points over Hadjar. Bortoleto qualified second in Qatar and finished fifth on Saturday. He then took the lead from Aron at the start of the feature race, only to be penalised for crossing the pit entry line behind the pit bollard when avoiding the pit lane entrance during a virtual safety car deployment. Though he progressed through the pack and crossed the line in first, Bortoleto was demoted behind Aron and Hadjar in the results, meaning that he and Hadjar would go into the season finale with a gap of half a point.

Bortoleto qualified second again on Yas Island. A charge from ninth to second in the sprint allowed him to enter the final race with a four-point advantage, as Hadjar finished fifth. The start of the feature race decided the championship fight, as Hadjar stalled on the grid. Bortoleto meanwhile took the lead from Victor Martins at turn one and although he was later overtaken by Dürksen following the pit stop phase, Bortoleto finished second and was crowned Formula 2 champion. He became the fourth champion in the FIA Formula 2 era to win the FIA F3 and F2 titles in successive years, following Charles Leclerc, George Russell, and Oscar Piastri, as well as the second Brazilian to triumph in the category after Felipe Drugovich in 2022.

== Formula One career ==
In September 2022, Bortoleto announced that he had joined A14, two time Formula One champion Fernando Alonso's driver management company. After winning the Formula 3 title, Bortoleto signed with the McLaren Driver Development Programme in October 2023. He completed his first test in Formula One machinery at the Red Bull Ring in September 2024, testing the McLaren MCL36.

Around the time that he completed his first test, Sauber Motorsport COO and CTO Mattia Binotto marked Bortoleto as one of the contenders for a seat at Kick Sauber in 2025, ahead of their takeover by Audi. Then three-time Formula One world champion Max Verstappen and race winner Oscar Piastri endorsed Bortoleto to be selected, with Piastri sharing his experience of not getting a seat immediately after winning the 2021 Formula 2 Championship and his hope that Bortoleto would avoid such a situation. Furthermore, McLaren team principal Andrea Stella revealed he would allow Bortoleto to leave their academy for Sauber if needed, praising him for his performances in his junior career.

=== Sauber / Audi (2025–present) ===
==== 2025: Rookie season with Sauber ====
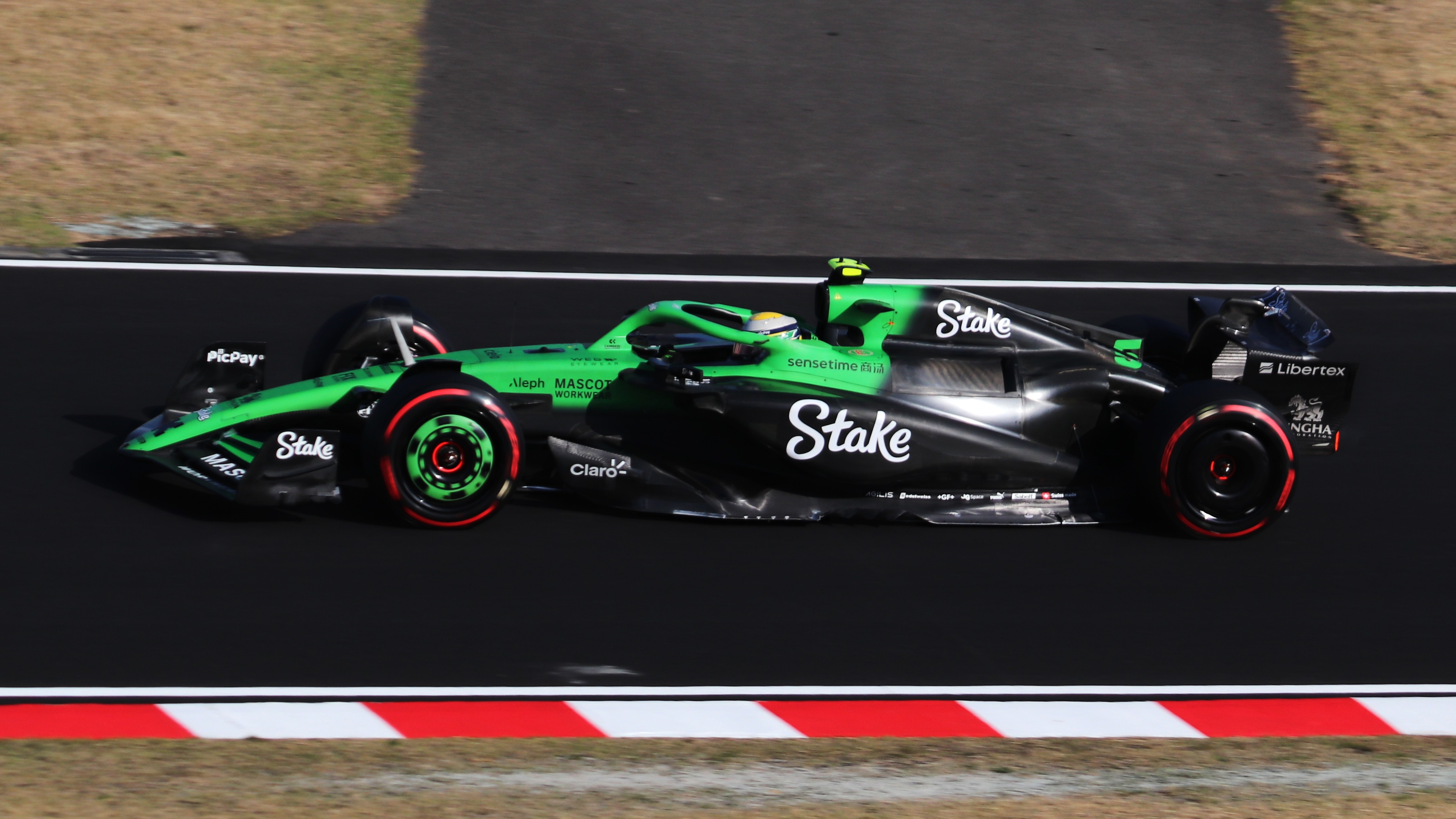
Bortoleto (pictured at the Japanese Grand Prix) debuted in Formula One with Sauber in 2025, ahead of their acquisition by Audi.

Bortoleto signed for Sauber in 2025, partnering Nico Hülkenberg on a multi-year deal beyond the 2026 regulation changes with Audi; they replaced Valtteri Bottas and Zhou Guanyu. He was subsequently released from the McLaren Driver Development Programme. On debut at the Australian Grand Prix, Bortoleto received acclaim for progressing to the second qualifying session, outqualifying teammate Hülkenberg; he crashed out of the race in changing conditions. He finished nineteenth in the Chinese Grand Prix sprint following a final-lap collision with Jack Doohan, before finishing fourteenth in the main race after spinning into the gravel trap on the opening lap. He then finished nineteenth in Japan on an alternate strategy, as well as eighteenth in both Bahrain—where he described the C45 as "undriveable"—and Saudi Arabia. Claiming fifteenth in the Miami Grand Prix sprint, he retired from the main race with a fuel system issue whilst running thirteenth. He started fourteenth in Emilia Romagna before dropping to eighteenth on an alternate strategy. A first-lap incident with Kimi Antonelli at Portier saw Bortoleto drop to last in the Monaco Grand Prix; he recovered to fourteenth.

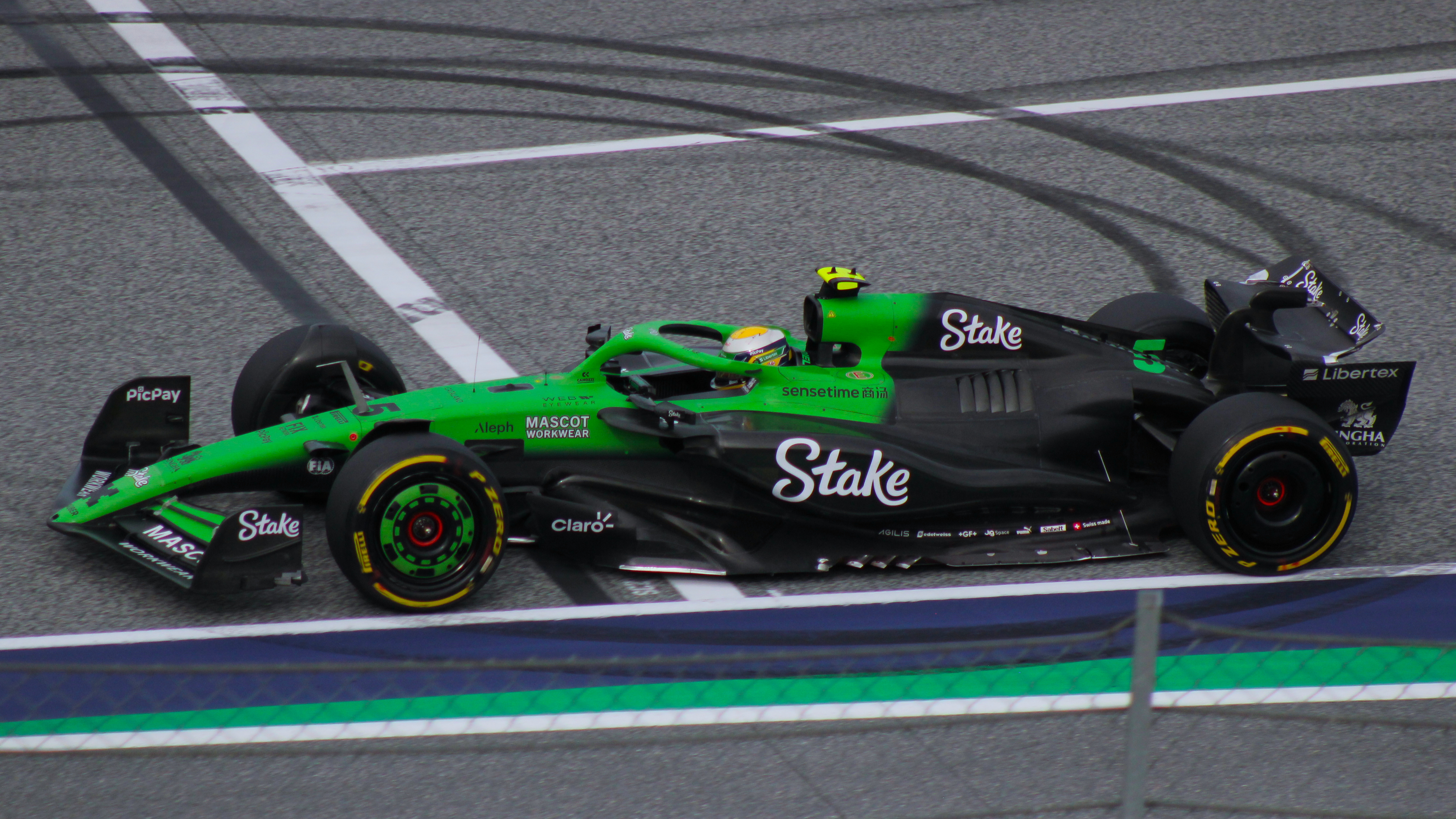
After mid-season upgrades to the C45, Bortoleto scored his maiden points finish at the Austrian Grand Prix.

Upgrades for the Spanish Grand Prix saw Sauber emerge as a midfield challenger, with Bortoleto qualifying and finishing twelfth. He dropped to fourteenth in Canada, prior to claiming his maiden points finish in Austria: qualifying eighth, he held position and challenged Fernando Alonso for seventh in the closing laps, becoming the first Brazilian to score points in Formula One since 2017. Starting seventeenth at the rain-affected British Grand Prix, he gambled with a formation lap switch to slick tyres and crashed out three laps later at Farm. He claimed ninth in both the sprint and wet–dry Grand Prix in Belgium, as well as seventh in qualifying for the Hungarian Grand Prix, where he held off Lance Stroll for sixth; Bortoleto had stayed past curfew on the Friday to adjust his setup with his engineers. He claimed fifteenth in the Netherlands after dropping to last with a slow start and a strategic error, before starting seventh and finishing eighth in Italy. Whilst battling Alexander Albon for tenth in the São Paulo sprint, he suffered a 57 g (560 m/s^{2}; 1,800 ft/s^{2}) barrier collision at the Senna 'S', forcing him to miss qualifying for his home Grand Prix. After starting from the last place on the grid at the São Paulo Grand Prix, he recovered some places before being tapped by Lance Stroll's Aston Martin marking an early end to his home race.

==== 2026: Audi ====
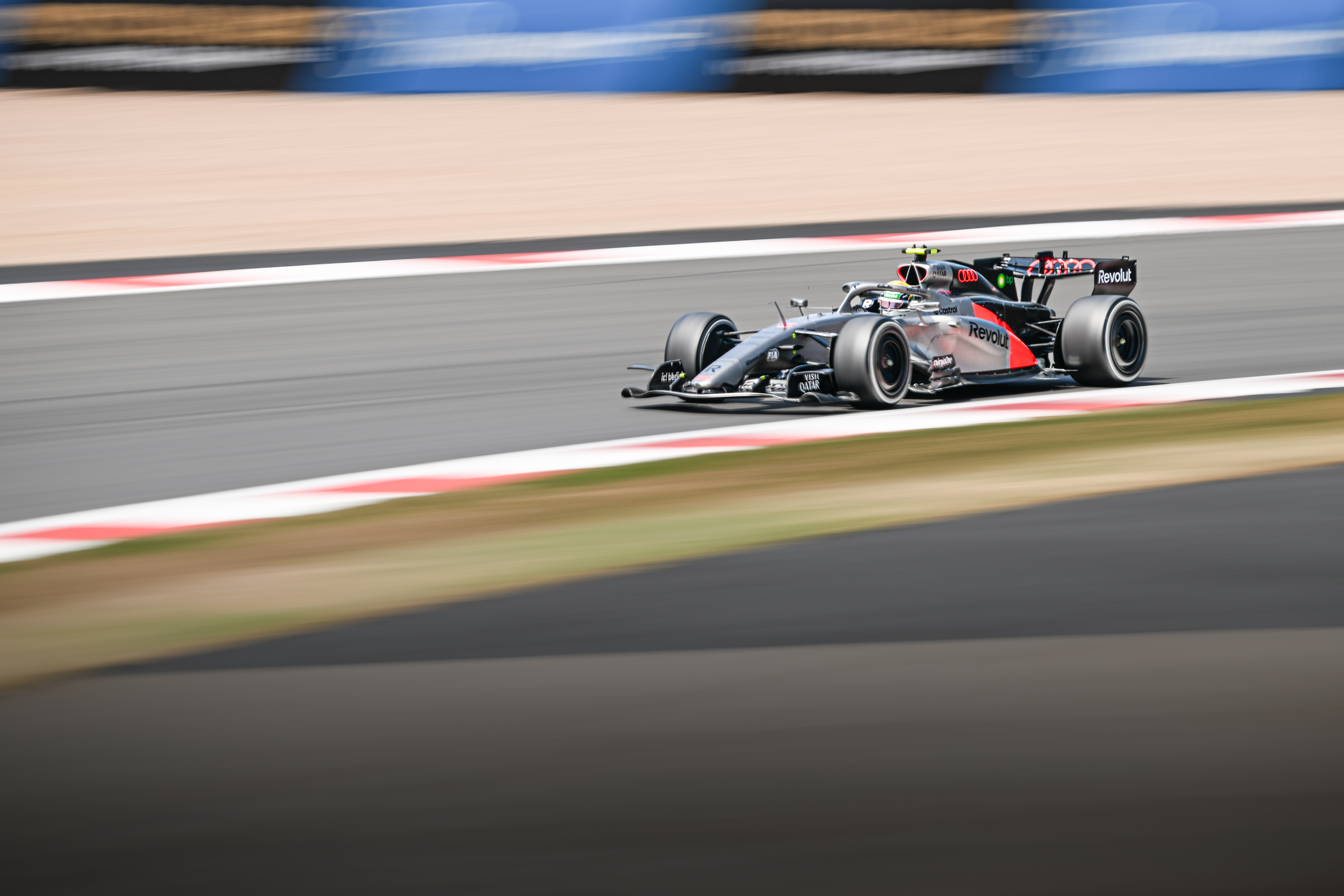
Bortoleto driving through Becketts corner for Audi Revolut F1 Team at the 2026 British Grand Prix

Bortoleto was contracted to retain his place alongside Hülkenberg at the re-branded Audi in 2026. He scored the team's first points as a manufacturer entrant on his Audi debut at the Australian Grand Prix, finishing ninth. He failed to start the following round in China after his car was withdrawn on the way to the grid with a hydraulic problem, one of four cars that did not start the race because of technical issues. He finished thirteenth in Japan, twelfth in Miami, and thirteenth in Canada, before a run of three consecutive eleventh-place finishes at Monaco, the Spanish Grand Prix and Austria left him narrowly outside the points on each occasion. Bortoleto ended the sequence at the 2026 British Grand Prix, finishing eighth at Silverstone for his first points since Australia, while teammate Hülkenberg retired. He placed eighth again at the Belgian Grand Prix, and eleventh at the Hungarian Grand Prix.

== Other activities ==
In November 2025, Bortoleto launched a collection in partnership with the Brazilian brand Barthelemy. The collection features elements from the driver's time with the Trident (Formula 3), Invicta (Formula 2), and Sauber (Formula One) teams.

== Awards and honours ==
- FIA Rookie of the Year: 2024
- Anthoine Hubert Award: 2024
- Aramco Best Rookie Award: 2023

== Karting record ==
=== Karting career summary ===
Season	Series	Team	Position
2012	Campeonato Sulbrasileiro de Kart — PMK/Mirim		9th
2012	Campeonato Paulista de Kart — Mirim		**2nd**
2012	Open do Brasileiro de Kart — Mirim		**1st**
2012	Campeonato Brasileiro de Kart — Mirim		**2nd**
2014	Super Kart Brasil — Cadete		**2nd**
2014	Open do Brasileiro de Kart — Cadete		**1st**
2014	Campeonato Brasileiro de Kart — Cadete		**3rd**
2016	Trofeo delle Industrie — 60 Mini		6th
2016	ROK Cup International Final — Mini ROK	Gamoto Asd	7th
2016	WSK Final Cup — 60 Mini	Gamoto Asd	29th
2017	WSK Champions Cup — OK-J	CRG	7th
2017	South Garda Winter Cup — OK-J	CRG	29th
2017	Andrea Margutti Trophy — OK-J	CRG	19th
2017	Trofeo delle Industrie — OK-J	CRG	11th
2017	WSK Super Master Series — OK-J	CRG	14th
2017	German Karting Championship — OK-J	CRG	31st
2017	CIK-FIA European Championship — OK-J	CRG	8th
2017	CIK-FIA World Championship — OK-J	CRG	7th
2017	SKUSA SuperNationals — X30 Junior	CRG	9th
2017	WSK Final Cup — OK-J	CRG	33rd
2018	WSK Champions Cup — OK-J	CRG	19th
2018	South Garda Winter Cup — OK-J	CRG	33rd
2018	Andrea Margutti Trophy — OK-J	CRG	**2nd**
2018	WSK Super Master Series — OK-J	CRG	**2nd**
2018	CIK-FIA European Championship — OK-J	CRG	**3rd**
2018	CIK-FIA World Championship — OK-J	CRG	**3rd**
2018	WSK Final Cup — OK	CRG	11th
2019	South Garda Winter Cup — OK	CRG	9th
2019	WSK Super Master Series — OK	CRG	7th
2019	CIK-FIA European Championship — OK	CRG	13th
2019	CIK-FIA World Championship — OK	CRG	33rd
2019	FIA International Super Cup — KZ2	CRG	53rd

=== Complete CIK-FIA Karting European Championship results ===
(key) (Races in bold indicate pole position) (Races in italics indicate fastest lap)

Year	Team	Class	1	2	3	4	5	6	7	8	9	10	DC	Points
2017	CRG	OK-J	SAR; QH; 1	**SAR**; **R** 2	CAY; QH; 13	CAY; R 31	LEM; QH; 24	LEM; R 13	ALA; QH; 12	ALA; R 10	KRI; QH; 17	KRI; R 20	8th	39
2018	CRG	OK-J	SAR; QH (6)	SAR; R (14)	PFI; QH; 2	PFI; R 6	AMP; QH; 1	AMP; R 3	ESS; QH; 4	ESS; R 3			3rd	68
2019	CRG	OK	ANG; QH; 9	ANG; R 6	GEN; QH; 24	GEN; R 12	KRI; QH; 19	KRI; R 10	LEM; QH; 23	LEM; R 33			13th	22

== Racing record ==
=== Racing career summary ===
Season	Series	Team	Races	Wins	Poles	F/Laps	Podiums	Points	Position
2020	Italian F4 Championship	Prema Powerteam	20	1	4	1	5	157	5th
2021	Formula Regional European Championship	FA Racing by MP	20	0	0	0	1	44	15th
2021	Stock Car Light Brasil	KTF Racing	4	1	1	0	1	60	13th
2022	Formula Regional Asian Championship	3Y by R-ace GP	6	1	0	0	1	44	15th
2022	Formula Regional European Championship	R-ace GP	20	2	2	1	5	176	6th
2022	Stock Car Brasil	KTF Sports	1	0	0	0	0	—N/a	NC†
2023	FIA Formula 3 Championship	Trident	18	2	1	3	6	164	**1st**
2024	FIA Formula 2 Championship	Invicta Racing	28	2	2	2	8	214.5	**1st**
2024	Formula One	McLaren F1 Team	Test driver						
2025	Formula One	Stake F1 Team Kick Sauber	24	0	0	0	0	19	19th
2026	Formula One	Audi Revolut F1 Team	20	0	0	0	0	14*	14th*

^{†} As Bortoleto was a guest driver, he was ineligible to score points.
* Season still in progress.

=== Complete Italian F4 Championship results ===
(key) (Races in bold indicate pole position) (Races in italics indicate fastest lap)

Year	Team	1	2	3	4	5	6	7	8	9	10	11	12	13	14	15	16	17	18	19	20	21	Pos	Points
2020	Prema Powerteam	MIS; 1; 7	MIS; 2; 7	MIS; 3; 11	IMO1; 1; 8	IMO1; 2; 7	IMO1; 3 Ret	RBR; 1; 7	RBR; 2; 7	RBR; 3; 13	MUG; 1; 2	**MUG**; **2**; 1	**MUG**; **3**; 3	MNZ; 1; 18†	MNZ; 2; 3	MNZ; 3; 2	IMO2; 1 Ret	IMO2; 2; 8	IMO2; 3; 8	VLL; 1; 4	**VLL**; **2** C	**VLL**; **3**; 4	5th	157

=== Complete Formula Regional European Championship results ===
(key) (Races in bold indicate pole position) (Races in italics indicate fastest lap)

Year	Team	1	2	3	4	5	6	7	8	9	10	11	12	13	14	15	16	17	18	19	20	DC	Points
2021	FA Racing by MP	IMO; 1; 9	IMO; 2; 11	CAT; 1; 23	CAT; 2; 22	MCO; 1; 23	MCO; 2; 21	LEC; 1; 18	LEC; 2; 28	ZAN; 1; 17	ZAN; 2; 18	SPA; 1; 28	SPA; 2; 12	RBR; 1; 7	RBR; 2; 2	VAL; 1; 11	VAL; 2; 9	MUG; 1; 6	MUG; 2; 8	MNZ; 1; 8	MNZ; 2; 28	15th	44
2022	R-ace GP	MNZ; 1; 6	MNZ; 2; 9	IMO; 1; 7	IMO; 2; 3	MCO; 1; 6	MCO; 2; 5	LEC; 1; 4	LEC; 2; 5	ZAN; 1 Ret	ZAN; 2; 8	HUN; 1; 9	HUN; 2; 3	SPA; 1; 14	SPA; 2; 1	RBR; 1; 15	RBR; 2; 5	CAT; 1; 7	**CAT**; **2**; 1	MUG; 1 Ret	**MUG**; **2**; 2	6th	176

=== Complete Stock Light results ===
(key) (Races in bold indicate pole position) (Races in italics indicate fastest lap)

Year	Team	1	2	3	4	5	6	7	8	9	10	11	12	13	14	15	16	DC	Points
2021	KTF Sports	GOI; 1	GOI; 2	INT1; 1	INT1; 2	MOG1; 1; 3	MOG1; 2; 9	CUR1; 1; 10	**CUR1**; **2**; **1**	CUR2; 1; 13	CUR2; 2; 5	MOG2; 1	MOG2; 2	SAN; 1	SAN; 2	INT1; 1	INT1; 2	6th	229

=== Complete Stock Car Brasil results ===
(key) (Races in bold indicate pole position) (Races in italics indicate fastest lap)

Year	Team	Car	1	2	3	4	5	6	7	8	9	10	11	12	13	14	15	16	17	18	19	20	21	22	23	Rank	Points
2022	KTF Sports	Chevrolet Cruze	INT; 1; 22	GOI; 1	GOI; 2	VCA; 1	VCA; 2	RIO; 1	RIO; 2	BRA; 1	BRA; 2	BRA; 1	BRA; 2	INT; 1	INT; 2	SCZ; 1	SCZ; 2	VCA; 1	VCA; 2	GOI; 1	GOI; 2	GOI; 1	GOI; 2	BRA; 1	BRA; 2	NC†	0†

^{†} As Bortoleto was a guest driver he was ineligible to score points.

=== Complete Formula Regional Asian Championship results ===
(key) (Races in bold indicate pole position) (Races in italics indicate the fastest lap of top ten finishers)

Year	Entrant	1	2	3	4	5	6	7	8	9	10	11	12	13	14	15	DC	Points
2022	3Y by R-ace GP	ABU; 1; 10	ABU; 2; 1	ABU; 3; 6	DUB; 1; 6	DUB; 2 Ret	DUB; 3; 8	DUB; 1	DUB; 2	DUB; 3	DUB; 1	DUB; 2	DUB; 3	ABU; 1	ABU; 2	ABU; 3	14th	46

=== Complete FIA Formula 3 Championship results ===
(key) (Races in bold indicate pole position) (Races in italics indicate fastest lap)

Year	Entrant	1	2	3	4	5	6	7	8	9	10	11	12	13	14	15	16	17	18	DC	Points
2023	Trident	BHR; SPR; 19	BHR; FEA; 1	MEL; SPR; 6	**MEL**; **FEA**; 1	MON; SPR; 6	MON; FEA; 5	CAT; SPR; 4	CAT; FEA; 4	RBR; SPR; 10	RBR; FEA; 2	SIL; SPR; 2	SIL; FEA; 6	HUN; SPR; 2	HUN; FEA; 7	SPA; SPR; Ret	SPA; FEA; 11	MNZ; SPR; 2	MNZ; FEA; 5	1st	164

=== Complete FIA Formula 2 Championship results ===
(key) (Races in bold indicate pole position) (Races in italics indicate fastest lap)

Year	Entrant	1	2	3	4	5	6	7	8	9	10	11	12	13	14	15	16	17	18	19	20	21	22	23	24	25	26	27	28	DC	Points
2024	Invicta Racing	BHR; SPR; 6	**BHR**; **FEA**; 5	JED; SPR; 10	JED; FEA; Ret	MEL; SPR; Ret	MEL; FEA; Ret	IMO; SPR; 6	**IMO**; **FEA**; 2	MON; SPR; 2	MON; FEA; 8	CAT; SPR; 5	CAT; FEA; 10	RBR; SPR; 4	RBR; FEA; 1	SIL; SPR; 4	SIL; FEA; 6	HUN; SPR; 16	HUN; FEA; 4	SPA; SPR; 10	SPA; FEA; 2	MNZ; SPR; 8	MNZ; FEA; 1	BAK; SPR; 5	BAK; FEA; 4	LSL; SPR; 5	LSL; FEA; 3	YMC; SPR; 2	YMC; FEA; 2	1st	214.5

=== Complete Formula One results ===
(key) (Races in bold indicate pole position; races in italics indicates fastest lap.)

Year	Entrant	Chassis	Engine	1	2	3	4	5	6	7	8	9	10	11	12	13	14	15	16	17	18	19	20	21	22	23	24	WDC	Points
2025	Stake F1 Team Kick Sauber	Kick Sauber C45	Ferrari 066/12 1.6 V6 t	AUS; Ret	CHN; 14	JPN; 19	BHR; 18	SAU; 18	MIA; Ret	EMI; 18	MON; 14	ESP; 12	CAN; 14	AUT; 8	GBR; Ret	BEL; 9	HUN; 6	NED; 15	ITA; 8	AZE; 11	SIN; 17	USA; 18	MXC; 10	SAP; Ret	LVG; Ret	QAT; 13	ABU; 11	19th	19
2026	Audi Revolut F1 Team	Audi R26	Audi AFR 26 Hybrid 1.6 V6 t	AUS; 9	CHN; DNS	JPN; 13	MIA; 12	CAN; 13	MON; 11	BCN; 11	AUT; 11	GBR; 8	BEL; 8	HUN; 11	NED; 13	ITA; 11	ESP; 13	AZE; 15	BHR; 18	SIN; Ret	USA; 13	MXC; 8	SAP; 16	LVG	QAT	ABU		14th*	14*

^{†} Did not finish, but was classified as he had completed more than 90% of the race distance.
* Season still in progress.

== Filmography ==
=== Television ===
Year	Title	Role	Notes	Ref.
2024	O Brasil de Volta ao Grid	Himself	Biographical short film	
2025	Bem-vindo Bortoleto	Himself	Biographical short film	

Sporting positions
Preceded by Victor Martins	FIA Formula 3 Championship; Champion; 2023	Succeeded by Leonardo Fornaroli
Preceded by Théo Pourchaire	FIA Formula 2 Championship; Champion; 2024	Succeeded by Leonardo Fornaroli
Awards
Preceded by Victor Martins	Anthoine Hubert Award; 2024	Incumbent
Preceded by Oscar Piastri	FIA Rookie of the Year; 2024	Incumbent
