= 2025 Singapore Grand Prix =

Eighteenth round of the 2025 F1 season

Race 18 of 24 in the 2025 Formula One World Championship
| ← Previous race | Next race → |
- Layout of the Marina Bay Street Circuit

Race details
- Date: 5 October 2025
- Official name: Formula 1 Singapore Airlines Singapore Grand Prix 2025
- Location: Marina Bay Street Circuit; Marina Bay, Singapore
- Course: Temporary street circuit
- Course length: 4.927 km (3.061 miles)
- Distance: 62 laps, 305.337 km (189.727 miles)
- Weather: Clear
- Attendance: 300,641

Pole position
| Driver | (United Kingdom) George Russell | Mercedes |
- Time: 1:29.158

Fastest lap
| Driver | (United Kingdom) Lewis Hamilton | Ferrari |
- Time: 1:33.808 on lap 48 (lap record)

Podium
| First | (United Kingdom) George Russell | Mercedes |
| Second | (Netherlands) Max Verstappen | Red Bull Racing-Honda RBPT |
| Third | (United Kingdom) Lando Norris | McLaren-Mercedes |

The 2025 Singapore Grand Prix (officially known as the Formula 1 Singapore Airlines Singapore Grand Prix 2025) was a Formula One motor race held on 5 October 2025 at the Marina Bay Street Circuit in Marina Bay, Singapore. It was the eighteenth round of the 2025 Formula One World Championship. George Russell of Mercedes converted his pole position into a win, ahead of Red Bull's Max Verstappen and McLaren's Lando Norris.

McLaren won its tenth Constructors' Championship at this event, and second in a row; this marked the first time McLaren had won consecutive Constructors' Championships since 1991, and the first Singapore Grand Prix to feature the crowning of a World Constructors' Champion. This was also the first Singapore Grand Prix to not feature a retirement.

The top five remained unchanged for both the Drivers' and Constructors' Championship, with Norris reducing his points deficit to 22 points behind championship leader Oscar Piastri. Defending champion Verstappen remained third, a further 41 points behind. In the fight for second place in the Constructors' Standings, Mercedes extended the gap to 27 points over Ferrari, who were seven points clear from fourth-placed Red Bull following McLaren's successful title defense, as they secured their second consecutive Constructors' title, and their tenth overall.

== Background ==
The event was held at the Marina Bay Street Circuit in Marina Bay for the 16th time in the circuit's history, across the weekend of 3–5 October. The Grand Prix was the eighteenth round of the 2025 Formula One World Championship and the 16th running of the Singapore Grand Prix as a round of the Formula One World Championship.

=== Championship standings before the race ===
Going into the weekend, Oscar Piastri led the Drivers' Championship with 324 points, 25 points ahead of teammate Lando Norris in second and 69 ahead of Max Verstappen in third. McLaren, with 634 points, led the Constructors' Championship ahead of Mercedes and Ferrari, who were second and third with 290 and 286 points, respectively.

==== Championship permutations ====
World Constructors' Championship leader McLaren had an opportunity to secure its tenth title at this event, and their second in a row. With seven rounds remaining in the season, a maximum of 346 points could still be scored. McLaren had an opportunity to secure the title if they scored just 13 points, regardless of where either Mercedes or Ferrari finished. As such, winning the race or scoring a podium with one of their drivers would secure the title; if either prerequisite was not met, both drivers would at least need to finish above the mentioned teams to do so. Mercedes would need to outscore McLaren by 31 points, and Ferrari by 35, to disallow them from achieving the title in this event. Red Bull had already been eliminated from contention, for the second season in a row, following the preceding Azerbaijan Grand Prix.

=== Entrants ===
The drivers and teams were the same as published in the season entry list with two exceptions; Yuki Tsunoda at Red Bull Racing held the seat originally held by Liam Lawson before Lawson was demoted back to Racing Bulls from the Japanese Grand Prix onward, and Franco Colapinto replaced Jack Doohan at Alpine from the Emilia Romagna Grand Prix onward until at least the Austrian Grand Prix on a rotating seat basis. Before the race at Spielberg, it was confirmed that Colapinto would retain his seat with the team, effectively on a race-by-race basis.

=== Tyre choices ===
Tyre supplier Pirelli brought the C3, C4 and C5 tyre compounds (designated hard, medium, and soft, respectively) for teams to use at the event.

=== Circuit change ===
The pit lane was widened by one metre; as such, the pit lane speed limit was increased from 60 km/h (37 mph) to 80 km/h (50 mph).

=== Weather forecast ===
Ahead of the weekend, the Fédération Internationale de l'Automobile (FIA) received a forecast predicting that the heat index would be greater than 31 °C (88 °F) at some time during the race. As a result, the FIA declared a "heat hazard"; in these conditions, teams may either equip their drivers with cooling systems, with the minimum weight limit being raised by 5 kilograms (11 lb) to compensate for the equipment, or add additional 0.5 kilograms (1 lb) of ballast in the cockpit. This change was introduced in 2025 to prevent driver overheating, as observed during the 2023 Qatar Grand Prix.

== Practice ==
Three free practice sessions were held for the event. The first free practice session was held on 3 October 2025, at 17:30 local time (UTC+8), and was topped by Fernando Alonso ahead of Charles Leclerc and Max Verstappen. Alexander Albon had a brake fire early into the session, which meant he did not set any time.

The second free practice session was held on the same day, at 21:00 local time, and was topped by Oscar Piastri ahead of Isack Hadjar and Verstappen. The session was affected by a red flag after George Russell hit the wall at turns 16–17, breaking his front wing. Another red flag occurred shortly after the session resumed, with Liam Lawson crashing his car after hitting the wall at turn 16 and stopping at the pit entrance. Leclerc was released from the pit lane early and crashed with Norris, damaging the front wing on the McLaren. Ferrari were fined €10,000 as a result. The third practice session was held on 4 October 2025, at 17:30 local time, and was topped by Verstappen ahead of Piastri and Russell. A red flag was observed due to Lawson losing the car at turn 7, sending him into the wall.

== Qualifying ==
Qualifying was held on 4 October 2025, at 21:00 local time (UTC+8), and determined the starting grid order for the race.

=== Qualifying report ===
George Russell took pole position for the race, driving for Mercedes, his second pole of the 2025 season. Max Verstappen qualified in second, and Drivers' Championship leader Oscar Piastri qualified in third. Williams drivers Alex Albon and Carlos Sainz qualified in 12th and 13th initially, but after an investigation post-qualifying, they were both disqualified for breaching the technical regulations.

=== Qualifying classification ===
| Pos. | No. | Driver | Constructor | Qualifying times | | | Final grid |
| Pos. | No. | Driver | Constructor | Q1 | Q2 | Q3 | Final grid |
|---|---|---|---|---|---|---|---|
| 1 | 63 | (United Kingdom) George Russell | Mercedes | 1:29.928 | 1:29.562 | 1:29.158 | 1 |
| 2 | 1 | (Netherlands) Max Verstappen | Red Bull Racing-Honda RBPT | 1:30.028 | 1:29.572 | 1:29.340 | 2 |
| 3 | 81 | (Australia) Oscar Piastri | McLaren-Mercedes | 1:30.313 | 1:29.813 | 1:29.524 | 3 |
| 4 | 12 | (Italy) Kimi Antonelli | Mercedes | 1:30.036 | 1:29.649 | 1:29.537 | 4 |
| 5 | 4 | (United Kingdom) Lando Norris | McLaren-Mercedes | 1:29.932 | 1:29.809 | 1:29.586 | 5 |
| 6 | 44 | (United Kingdom) Lewis Hamilton | Ferrari | 1:29.765 | 1:29.936 | 1:29.688 | 6 |
| 7 | 16 | (Monaco) Charles Leclerc | Ferrari | 1:30.370 | 1:29.914 | 1:29.784 | 7 |
| 8 | 6 | (France) Isack Hadjar | Racing Bulls-Honda RBPT | 1:30.214 | 1:30.016 | 1:29.846 | 8 |
| 9 | 87 | (United Kingdom) Oliver Bearman | Haas-Ferrari | 1:30.420 | 1:30.076 | 1:29.868 | 9 |
| 10 | 14 | (Spain) Fernando Alonso | Aston Martin Aramco-Mercedes | 1:30.745 | 1:30.054 | 1:29.955 | 10 |
| 11 | 27 | (Germany) Nico Hülkenberg | Kick Sauber-Ferrari | 1:30.715 | 1:30.141 | N/A | 11 |
| 12 | 30 | (New Zealand) Liam Lawson | Racing Bulls-Honda RBPT | 1:30.681 | 1:30.320 | N/A | 12 |
| 13 | 22 | (Japan) Yuki Tsunoda | Red Bull Racing-Honda RBPT | 1:30.574 | 1:30.353 | N/A | 13 |
| 14 | 5 | (Brazil) Gabriel Bortoleto | Kick Sauber-Ferrari | 1:30.820 | N/A | N/A | 14 |
| 15 | 18 | (Canada) Lance Stroll | Aston Martin Aramco-Mercedes | 1:30.949 | N/A | N/A | 15 |
| 16 | 43 | (Argentina) Franco Colapinto | Alpine-Renault | 1:30.982 | N/A | N/A | 16 |
| 17 | 31 | (France) Esteban Ocon | Haas-Ferrari | 1:30.989 | N/A | N/A | 17 |
| 18 | 10 | (France) Pierre Gasly | Alpine-Renault | 1:31.261 | N/A | N/A | PL^{1} |
| DSQ | 23 | (Thailand) Alexander Albon | Williams-Mercedes | 1:30.775 | 1:30.202 | N/A | PL^{2} |
| DSQ | 55 | (Spain) Carlos Sainz Jr. | Williams-Mercedes | 1:30.640 | 1:30.235 | N/A | 18^{2} |
107% time: 1:36.048

Notes

- ^1 – Pierre Gasly qualified 18th, but was required to start the race from the pit lane as his car was modified under parc fermé conditions.
- ^2 – Alexander Albon and Carlos Sainz Jr. qualified 12th and 13th, respectively, but were disqualified for a DRS infringement. They were allowed to race at the stewards' discretion. Albon was required to start the race from the pit lane as his car was modified under parc fermé conditions.

== Race ==
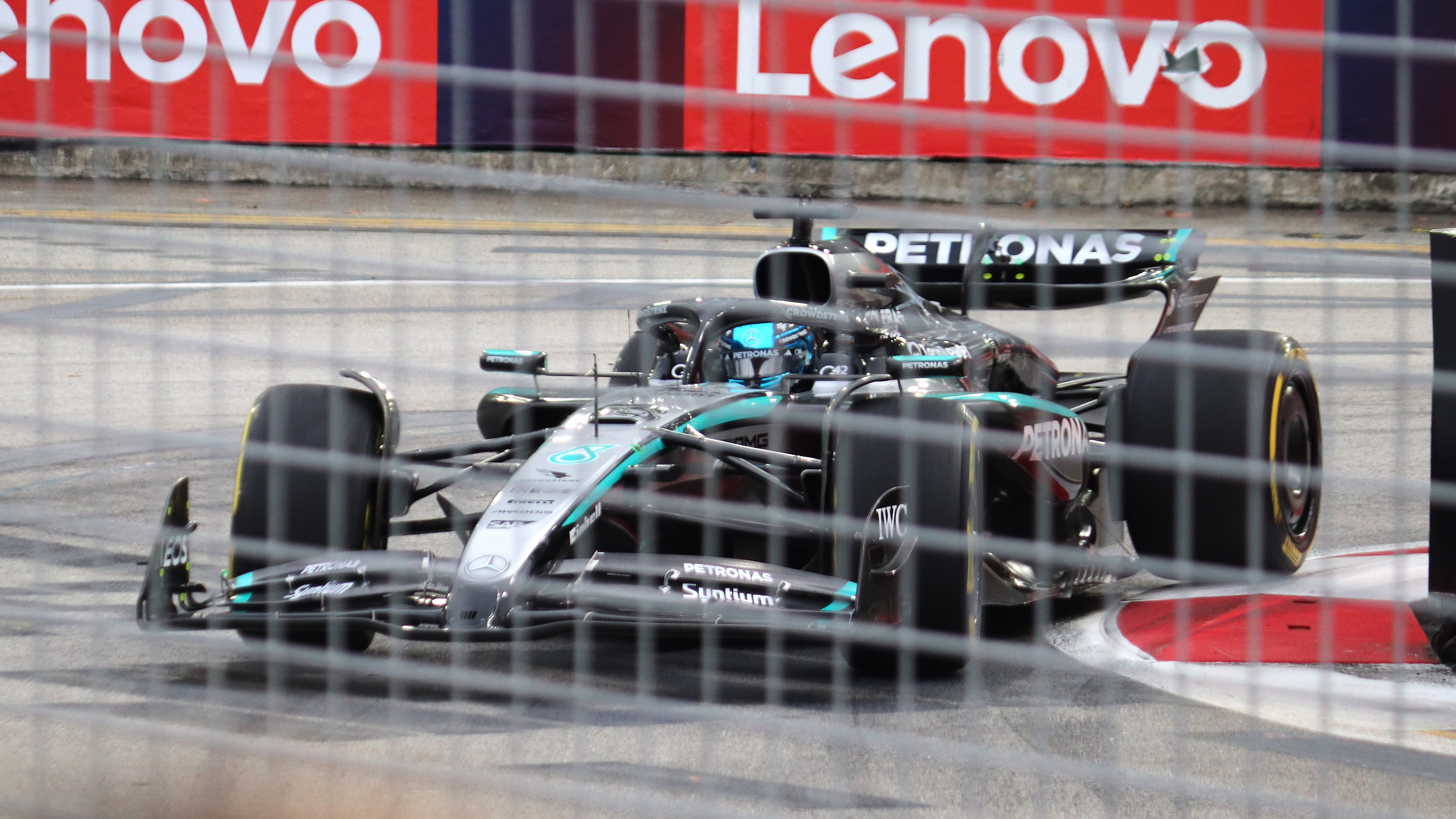
George Russell took his second victory of the season ahead of Verstappen and Norris.

The race was held on 5 October 2025, at 20:00 local time (UTC+8), and was run for 62 laps.

=== Race report ===
George Russell had a good start from pole position. Max Verstappen opted to start on soft tyres in an attempt take the lead from Russell, but had no advantage as Russell kept the lead into turn 1. Lando Norris gained two positions in the opening lap, but sustained damage to his front wing as he collided with his McLaren teammate Oscar Piastri and the back of Verstappen's Red Bull after going too deep into turn 3, dropping Piastri from third to fifth.

In the midfield, Gabriel Bortoleto and Lance Stroll made contact in turn 1 of the opening lap. Further back, Alexander Albon and Pierre Gasly started from the pit lane after making changes to the Williams and Alpine cars under parc fermé conditions. Piastri suffered a slow pit stop at 5.2 seconds and Fernando Alonso also suffered a slow 9.2 second pit stop in the Aston Martin. Russell comfortably won the race ahead of Verstappen and Norris, whose third place finish and Piastri's fourth were enough to secure the Constructors' Championship for McLaren. Kimi Antonelli finished in fifth, Charles Leclerc in sixth, and Alonso, Lewis Hamilton, Oliver Bearman, and Carlos Sainz rounded out the top ten. Isack Hadjar suffered from a power issue for most of the race and finished outside of the points, despite qualifying in eighth.

=== Post-race ===
McLaren secured the 2025 Constructors' Championship with 650 points, their second consecutive title victory. Mercedes (325 points) extended their points lead over Ferrari (298 points) in the battle for second place in the Constructors' Championship. Piastri retained his Driver's Championship lead by 22 points over teammate Norris, and 63 points over rival Verstappen. Hamilton was given a 5-second time penalty for track limits, dropping him to eighth in the final race classification.

=== Race classification ===
| Pos. | No. | Driver | Constructor | Laps | Time/Retired | Grid | Points |
|---|---|---|---|---|---|---|---|
| 1 | 63 | (United Kingdom) George Russell | Mercedes | 62 | 1:40:22.367 | 1 | 25 |
| 2 | 1 | (Netherlands) Max Verstappen | Red Bull Racing-Honda RBPT | 62 | +5.430 | 2 | 18 |
| 3 | 4 | (United Kingdom) Lando Norris | McLaren-Mercedes | 62 | +6.066 | 5 | 15 |
| 4 | 81 | (Australia) Oscar Piastri | McLaren-Mercedes | 62 | +8.146 | 3 | 12 |
| 5 | 12 | (Italy) Kimi Antonelli | Mercedes | 62 | +33.681 | 4 | 10 |
| 6 | 16 | (Monaco) Charles Leclerc | Ferrari | 62 | +45.996 | 7 | 8 |
| 7 | 14 | (Spain) Fernando Alonso | Aston Martin Aramco-Mercedes | 62 | +1:20.667 | 10 | 6 |
| 8 | 44 | (United Kingdom) Lewis Hamilton | Ferrari | 62 | +1:25.251^{1} | 6 | 4 |
| 9 | 87 | (United Kingdom) Oliver Bearman | Haas-Ferrari | 62 | +1:33.527 | 9 | 2 |
| 10 | 55 | (Spain) Carlos Sainz Jr. | Williams-Mercedes | 61 | +1 lap | 18 | 1 |
| 11 | 6 | (France) Isack Hadjar | Racing Bulls-Honda RBPT | 61 | +1 lap | 8 | |
| 12 | 22 | (Japan) Yuki Tsunoda | Red Bull Racing-Honda RBPT | 61 | +1 lap | 13 | |
| 13 | 18 | (Canada) Lance Stroll | Aston Martin Aramco-Mercedes | 61 | +1 lap | 15 | |
| 14 | 23 | (Thailand) Alexander Albon | Williams-Mercedes | 61 | +1 lap | PL | |
| 15 | 30 | (New Zealand) Liam Lawson | Racing Bulls-Honda RBPT | 61 | +1 lap | 12 | |
| 16 | 43 | (Argentina) Franco Colapinto | Alpine-Renault | 61 | +1 lap | 16 | |
| 17 | 5 | (Brazil) Gabriel Bortoleto | Kick Sauber-Ferrari | 61 | +1 lap | 14 | |
| 18 | 31 | (France) Esteban Ocon | Haas-Ferrari | 61 | +1 lap | 17 | |
| 19 | 10 | (France) Pierre Gasly | Alpine-Renault | 61 | +1 lap | PL | |
| 20 | 27 | (Germany) Nico Hülkenberg | Kick Sauber-Ferrari | 61 | +1 lap | 11 | |

Notes

- ^1 – Lewis Hamilton finished seventh on track, but received a post-race five-second time penalty for exceeding track limits.

== Championship standings after the race ==
Drivers' Championship standings

| Pos. | Driver | Points |
|---|---|---|
| 1 | (Australia) **Oscar Piastri*** | 336 |
| 2 | (United Kingdom) **Lando Norris*** | 314 |
| 3 | (Netherlands) **Max Verstappen*** | 273 |
| 4 | (United Kingdom) **George Russell*** | 237 |
| 5 | (Monaco) **Charles Leclerc*** | 173 |

Constructors' Championship standings

| Pos. | Constructor | Points |
|---|---|---|
| 1 | (United Kingdom) **McLaren-Mercedes*** | 650 |
| 2 | (Germany) Mercedes | 325 |
| 3 | (Italy) Ferrari | 298 |
| 4 | (Austria) Red Bull Racing-Honda RBPT | 290 |
| 5 | (United Kingdom) Williams-Mercedes | 102 |

- Note: Only the top five positions are included for both sets of standings.
- Competitors marked in bold and with an asterisk could still become the 2025 World Champion.

| Previous race: 2025 Azerbaijan Grand Prix | FIA Formula One World Championship; 2025 season | Next race: 2025 United States Grand Prix |
| Previous race: 2024 Singapore Grand Prix | Singapore Grand Prix | Next race: 2026 Singapore Grand Prix |
