= 2023 Spanish Grand Prix =

Formula One motor race

Race 7 of 22 in the 2023 Formula One World Championship
← Previous race	Next race →
- Layout of the Circuit de Barcelona-Catalunya, Spain

Race details
- Date: 4 June 2023
- Official name: Formula 1 AWS Gran Premio de España 2023
- Location: Circuit de Barcelona-Catalunya, Montmeló, Spain
- Course: Permanent racing facility
- Course length: 4.657 km (2.894 miles)
- Distance: 66 laps, 307.236 km (190.908 miles)
- Weather: Cloudy
- Attendance: 284,066

Pole position
Driver	(Netherlands) Max Verstappen	Red Bull Racing-Honda RBPT
- Time: 1:12.272

Fastest lap
Driver	(Netherlands) Max Verstappen	Red Bull Racing-Honda RBPT
- Time: 1:16.330 on lap 61

Podium
First	(Netherlands) Max Verstappen	Red Bull Racing-Honda RBPT
Second	(United Kingdom) Lewis Hamilton	Mercedes
Third	(United Kingdom) George Russell	Mercedes

The 2023 Spanish Grand Prix (officially known as the Formula 1 AWS Gran Premio de España 2023) was a Formula One motor race that was held on 4 June 2023 at the Circuit de Barcelona-Catalunya in Montmeló, Spain. It was the seventh round of the 2023 Formula One World Championship.

After taking pole position, Max Verstappen of Red Bull Racing led every lap, took the fastest lap, and won the race ahead of Mercedes drivers Lewis Hamilton and George Russell in second and third respectively, marking Verstappen's third career grand chelem.

== Background ==
The event was held across the weekend of 2–4 June 2023. It was the seventh round of the 2023 Formula One World Championship.

Following the upgrade package to the Mercedes W14 introduced in the previous round, the Monaco Grand Prix, further upgrades improving the car's airflow were introduced to this event. Ferrari revealed an upgrade package for their SF-23, switching from an in-wash solution to a down-wash, similar to Red Bull Racing's RB19. It received a minor upgrade to its floor and diffuser.

=== Championship standings before the race ===
Max Verstappen was the Drivers' Championship leader after the sixth round, the Monaco Grand Prix, with 144 points, 39 ahead of Sergio Pérez in second, with Fernando Alonso in third, 12 points behind Pérez. In the Constructors' Championship, Red Bull Racing led Aston Martin by 129 points and Mercedes by 130.

=== Entrants ===
The drivers and teams were the same as the season entry list with no additional stand-in drivers for the race.

=== Tyre choices ===
Tyre supplier Pirelli brought the C1, C2, and C3 tyre compounds (designated hard, medium, and soft, respectively) for teams to use at the event. For this Grand Prix, drivers could run in the first two practice sessions two sets of new hard tyre that would be introduced for the British Grand Prix.

=== Track changes ===
From this edition, Formula One would use the layout used by MotoGP since 2021, removing the chicane in the last sector of the lap that Formula One had used every year since it was introduced in 2007, and reverting the final corners for Formula One cars to a sweeping fast configuration that Formula One last used in 2006.

== Practice ==
Three free practice sessions were held for the event. The first free practice session was held on 2 June 2023, at 13:30 local time (UTC+2). Max Verstappen topped the session ahead of Sergio Pérez and Esteban Ocon. The second free practice session was held on 2 June 2023, at 17:00 local time (UTC+2). Verstappen topped the session ahead of Fernando Alonso and Nico Hulkenberg. The third free practice session was held on 3 June 2023, at 12:30 local time (UTC+2). Verstappen again topped the session ahead of Sergio Pérez and Lewis Hamilton.

== Qualifying ==
Qualifying was held on 3 June 2023, at 16:00 local time (UTC+2).

=== Qualifying report ===
George Russell reported incoming rain as the first segment began; the first half of the Formula 2 race earlier that day was held under heavy rain. Valtteri Bottas went off the track at turn 12, red-flagging the session due to gravel on the track, Bottas recovered back to track as the red flag was waved. Joining Bottas in the gravel was Spaniard Fernando Alonso and Alexander Albon at the final corner and turn 5, respectively. Nico Hülkenberg topped the session, but his lap time was soon deleted due to a track limits infringement. Charles Leclerc had a poor session, setting a time good enough for nineteenth and knocking him out of the first segment for the first time since the 2019 Monaco Grand Prix. Also eliminated were Bottas, Kevin Magnussen, Albon, and Logan Sargeant.

The second segment saw Sergio Pérez go off-track. An incident involving Lewis Hamilton and George Russell made contact on the main straight, with the former suffering from significant front-wing damage. Russell was investigated for impeding, before being cleared, and joined Pérez, Zhou Guanyu, and the AlphaTauris of Nyck de Vries and Yuki Tsunoda in being eliminated.

Hamilton took a new front wing as the third and final segment began and qualified in fifth. Verstappen took the pole position, his first at the Spanish Grand Prix, with Sainz trailing him behind. Lando Norris was in third while Oscar Piastri occupied the tenth and final position on the Q3 grid. Alonso had a time good enough for ninth, out-qualified by Lance Stroll in sixth. Gasly was set to enjoy a fourth-position finish, until two separate three-place penalties for impeding other drivers dropped him to tenth, with teammate Esteban Ocon in seventh. Nico Hülkenberg qualified eighth.

=== Qualifying classification ===
Pos.	No.	Driver	Constructor	Qualifying times			Final grid
Pos.	No.	Driver	Constructor	Q1	Q2	Q3	Final grid
1	1	(Netherlands) Max Verstappen	Red Bull Racing-Honda RBPT	1:13.615	1:12.760	1:12.272	1
2	55	(Spain) Carlos Sainz Jr.	Ferrari	1:13.411	1:12.790	1:12.734	2
3	4	(United Kingdom) Lando Norris	McLaren-Mercedes	1:13.295	1:12.776	1:12.792	3
4	10	(France) Pierre Gasly	Alpine-Renault	1:13.471	1:13.186	1:12.816	10^{a}
5	44	(United Kingdom) Lewis Hamilton	Mercedes	1:12.937	1:12.999	1:12.818	4
6	18	(Canada) Lance Stroll	Aston Martin Aramco-Mercedes	1:13.766	1:13.082	1:12.994	5
7	31	(France) Esteban Ocon	Alpine-Renault	1:13.433	1:13.001	1:13.083	6
8	27	(Germany) Nico Hülkenberg	Haas-Ferrari	1:13.420	1:13.283	1:13.229	7
9	14	(Spain) Fernando Alonso	Aston Martin Aramco-Mercedes	1:13.747	1:13.098	1:13.507	8
10	81	(Australia) Oscar Piastri	McLaren-Mercedes	1:13.691	1:13.059	1:13.682	9
11	11	(Mexico) Sergio Pérez	Red Bull Racing-Honda RBPT	1:13.874	1:13.334	N/A	11
12	63	(United Kingdom) George Russell	Mercedes	1:13.326	1:13.447	N/A	12
13	24	(China) Zhou Guanyu	Alfa Romeo-Ferrari	1:13.677	1:13.521	N/A	13
14	21	(Netherlands) Nyck de Vries	AlphaTauri-Honda RBPT	1:13.581	1:14.083	N/A	14
15	22	(Japan) Yuki Tsunoda	AlphaTauri-Honda RBPT	1:13.862	1:14.477	N/A	15
16	77	(Finland) Valtteri Bottas	Alfa Romeo-Ferrari	1:13.977	N/A	N/A	16
17	20	(Denmark) Kevin Magnussen	Haas-Ferrari	1:14.042	N/A	N/A	17
18	23	(Thailand) Alexander Albon	Williams-Mercedes	1:14.063	N/A	N/A	18
19	16	(Monaco) Charles Leclerc	Ferrari	1:14.079	N/A	N/A	PL^{b}
20	2	(United States) Logan Sargeant	Williams-Mercedes	1:14.699	N/A	N/A	PL^{c}
107% time: 1:18.042

Notes

- ^a – Pierre Gasly received two three-place grid penalties for impeding Carlos Sainz Jr. and Max Verstappen in Q1.
- ^b – Charles Leclerc qualified 19th, but he received a 15-place grid penalty for exceeding his quota of power unit elements. He was then required to start the race from the pit lane due to changes made to the set up of the suspension under parc fermé.
- ^c – Logan Sargeant qualified 20th, but he was required to start the race from the pit lane due to changes made to the set up of the suspension under parc fermé.

== Race ==
The race was held on 4 June 2023, at 15:00 local time (UTC+2).

=== Race report ===
Polesitter Max Verstappen led from start to finish. Lando Norris made contact with Lewis Hamilton coming into the first corner, damaging his front wing and forcing him to come into the pit lane for a change, dropping him to last. Hamilton's floor was also damaged. Hamilton's teammate George Russell was noted by stewards for gaining an advantage on the opening chicane; no investigation was necessary. In an early stop, Valtteri Bottas swapped his softs compound tyres for hards as Charles Leclerc, who started from pit-lane, passed Alexander Albon for sixteenth; Lance Stroll was running as high as third until Hamilton passed him.

Zhou Guanyu and Nico Hülkenberg swapped their softs for hards on lap 9 with the Alfa driver overtaking the Haas. Esteban Ocon soon followed into the pits. Carlos Sainz Jr. came in on lap 16 for mediums, prompting a confused response from the Ferrari driver; meanwhile Leclerc put on softs. Sergio Pérez soon found himself behind Fernando Alonso, with the Aston Martin soon putting on softs. Norris soon returned to the pits with mediums in-hand; Hamilton followed with mediums and rejoined behind Sainz. With drivers coming in for their stops, Verstappen and Pérez led a 1–2 for Red Bull with Sainz in third; furthermore, Verstappen had pulled such a large gap he swapped for hards by lap 26 and did not lose the lead to his teammate. However, Pérez would drop to ninth after a stop for hards, and soon passed Alonso with the aid of DRS. His tyres degrading as he went, Stroll decided to take the hards and rejoined in thirteenth. Meanwhile, Oscar Piastri went into the pits along with Pierre Gasly.

By lap 50, Sainz, Alonso, Russell, Hamilton and Pérez all swapped their compounds while Verstappen was shown a black and white flag due to three track limits violations. Ocon pulled a defense on Alonso, which Alonso was able to evade. Yuki Tsunoda was given a five-second penalty for forcing Zhou off track, dropping him out of the points from ninth position. Verstappen would take the fastest lap and win the race ahead of Hamilton and Russell, earning him his third career grand slam.

=== Race classification ===
Pos.	No.	Driver	Constructor	Laps	Time/Retired	Grid	Points
1	1	(Netherlands) Max Verstappen	Red Bull Racing-Honda RBPT	66	1:27:57.940	1	26^{1}
2	44	(United Kingdom) Lewis Hamilton	Mercedes	66	+24.090	4	18
3	63	(United Kingdom) George Russell	Mercedes	66	+32.389	12	15
4	11	(Mexico) Sergio Pérez	Red Bull Racing-Honda RBPT	66	+35.812	11	12
5	55	(Spain) Carlos Sainz Jr.	Ferrari	66	+45.698	2	10
6	18	(Canada) Lance Stroll	Aston Martin Aramco-Mercedes	66	+1:03.320	5	8
7	14	(Spain) Fernando Alonso	Aston Martin Aramco-Mercedes	66	+1:04.127	8	6
8	31	(France) Esteban Ocon	Alpine-Renault	66	+1:09.242	6	4
9	24	(China) Zhou Guanyu	Alfa Romeo-Ferrari	66	+1:11.878	13	2
10	10	(France) Pierre Gasly	Alpine-Renault	66	+1:13.530	10	1
11	16	(Monaco) Charles Leclerc	Ferrari	66	+1:14.419	PL	
12	22	(Japan) Yuki Tsunoda	AlphaTauri-Honda RBPT	66	+1:15.416^{2}	15	
13	81	(Australia) Oscar Piastri	McLaren-Mercedes	65	+1 lap	9	
14	21	(Netherlands) Nyck de Vries	AlphaTauri-Honda RBPT	65	+1 lap	14	
15	27	(Germany) Nico Hülkenberg	Haas-Ferrari	65	+1 lap	7	
16	23	(Thailand) Alexander Albon	Williams-Mercedes	65	+1 lap	18	
17	4	(United Kingdom) Lando Norris	McLaren-Mercedes	65	+1 lap	3	
18	20	(Denmark) Kevin Magnussen	Haas-Ferrari	65	+1 lap	17	
19	77	(Finland) Valtteri Bottas	Alfa Romeo-Ferrari	65	+1 lap	16	
20	2	(United States) Logan Sargeant	Williams-Mercedes	65	+1 lap	PL	
Fastest lap: (Netherlands) Max Verstappen (Red Bull Racing-Honda RBPT) – 1:16.330 (lap 61)

Notes

- ^1 – Includes one point for fastest lap.
- ^2 – Yuki Tsunoda finished ninth, but he received a five-second time penalty for forcing Zhou Guanyu off the track.

== Championship standings after the race ==
Drivers' Championship standings

Pos.	Driver	Points
1	(Netherlands) Max Verstappen	170
2	(Mexico) Sergio Pérez	117
3	(Spain) Fernando Alonso	99
4	(United Kingdom) Lewis Hamilton	87
5	(United Kingdom) George Russell	65

Constructors' Championship standings

	Pos.	Constructor	Points
	1	(Austria) Red Bull Racing-Honda RBPT	287
1	2	(Germany) Mercedes	152
1	3	(United Kingdom) Aston Martin Aramco-Mercedes	134
	4	(Italy) Ferrari	100
	5	(France) Alpine-Renault	40

- Note: Only the top five positions are included for both sets of standings.

== See also ==
- 2023 Barcelona Formula 2 round
- 2023 Barcelona Formula 3 round

Previous race: 2023 Monaco Grand Prix	FIA Formula One World Championship; 2023 season	Next race: 2023 Canadian Grand Prix
Previous race: 2022 Spanish Grand Prix	Spanish Grand Prix	Next race: 2024 Spanish Grand Prix
