= 2023 Formula One World Championship =

74th season of Formula One

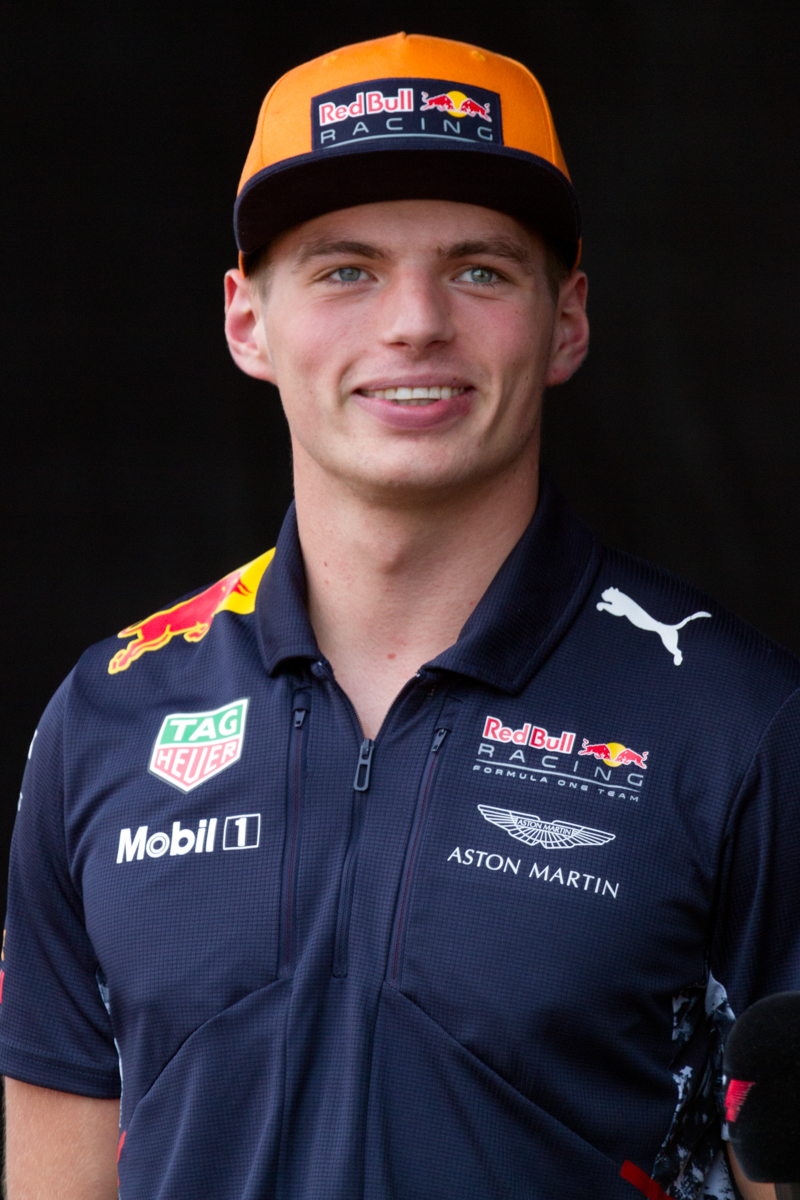
Max Verstappen won his third consecutive World Drivers' Championship, driving for Red Bull Racing-Honda RBPT, winning 19 out of 22 races.

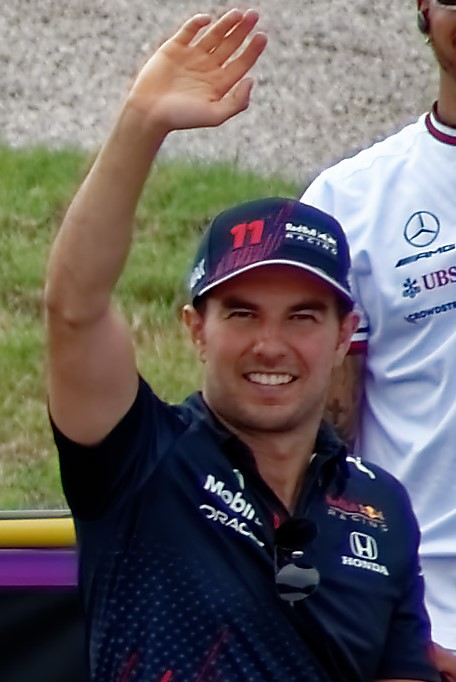
Sergio Pérez finished second, giving Red Bull Racing their first ever 1–2 in the World Drivers' Championship.

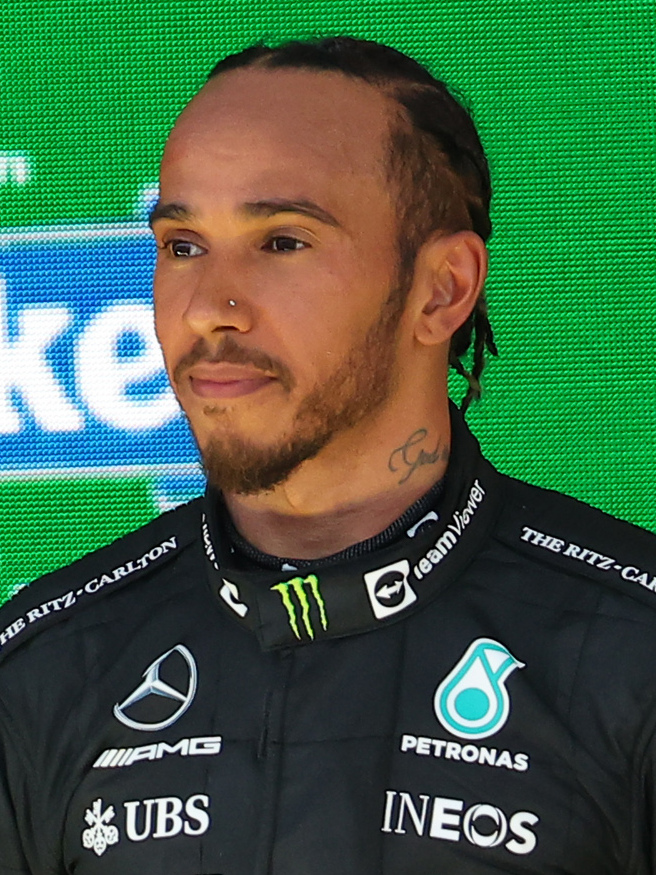
Seven-time champion Lewis Hamilton finished third, driving for Mercedes.

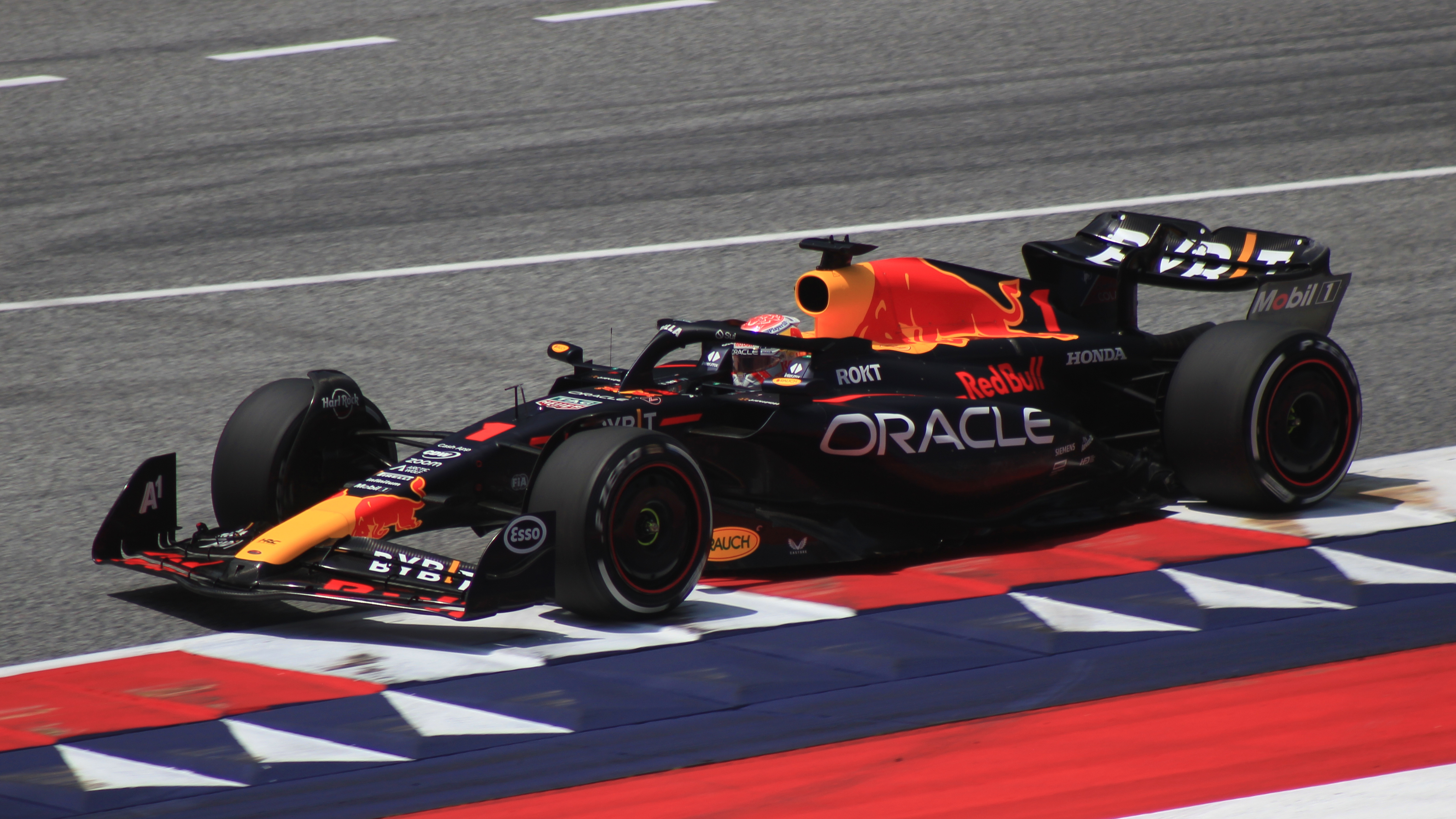
Red Bull Racing won their second consecutive World Constructors' Championship and sixth overall.

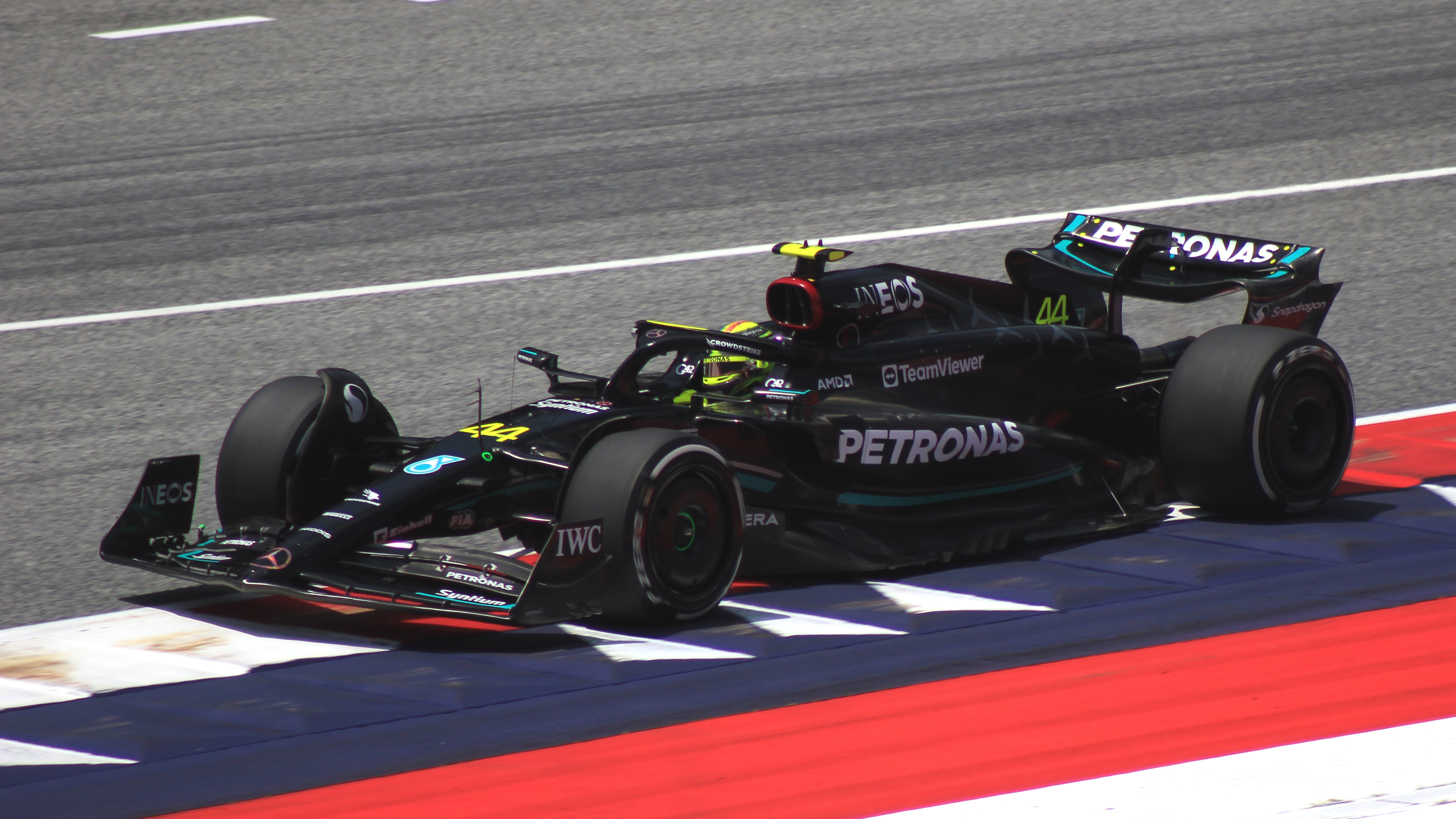
Mercedes finished second in the World Constructors' Championship.

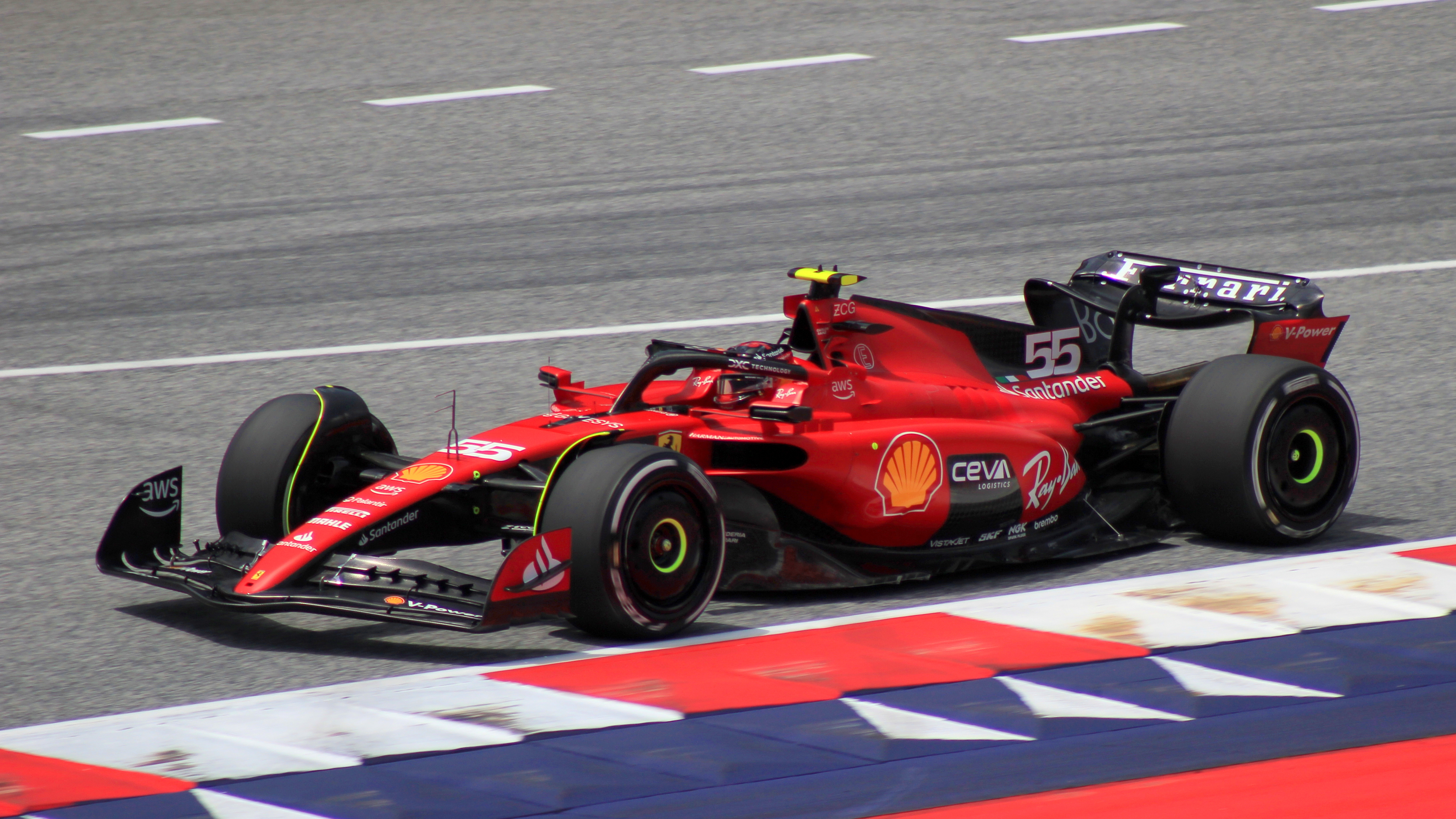
Ferrari finished third in the World Constructors' Championship.

The 2023 FIA Formula One World Championship was a motor racing championship for Formula One cars and the 74th running of the Formula One World Championship. It was recognised by the Fédération Internationale de l'Automobile (FIA), the governing body of international motorsport, as the highest class of competition for open-wheel racing cars. The championship was contested over twenty-two Grands Prix, which were held around the world. It began in March and ended in November.

Drivers and teams competed for the titles of World Drivers' Champion and World Constructors' Champion respectively. The season was dominated by defending champion Max Verstappen, who cruised to his third consecutive Drivers' Championship title at the Qatar Grand Prix, winning a record 19 out of 22 Grands Prix held and finishing on the podium 21 times (also a record number for most podiums in a season) by the end of the championship. His team Red Bull Racing achieved their sixth Constructors' Championship title, their second consecutively, at the preceding Japanese Grand Prix. Red Bull Racing won 21 out of 22 Grands Prix, breaking the team record for highest percentage of Grand Prix wins in a season at 95.45%. Ferrari were the only other team to win a Grand Prix, courtesy of Carlos Sainz Jr. at the Singapore Grand Prix.

== Entries ==
All teams competed with tyres supplied by Pirelli. Each team was required to enter two drivers per round, one for each of the two mandatory cars.

Teams and drivers that competed in the 2023 World Championship
Entrant	Constructor	Chassis	Power unit	Race drivers		
Entrant	Constructor	Chassis	Power unit	No.	Driver name	Rounds
(Switzerland) Alfa Romeo F1 Team Stake (Note: Alfa Romeo initially entered round 2 as "Alfa Romeo F1 Team Kick", before the publication of a second entry list that showed the entrant as "Alfa Romeo F1 Team Stake". Alfa Romeo entered rounds 3, 7, 12 and 17 as "Alfa Romeo F1 Team Kick".)	Alfa Romeo-Ferrari	C43	Ferrari 066/10	24; 77	(China) Zhou Guanyu (Finland) Valtteri Bottas	All; All
(Italy) Scuderia AlphaTauri	AlphaTauri-Honda RBPT	AT04	Honda RBPTH001	21; 3; 40; 22	(Netherlands) Nyck de Vries (Australia) Daniel Ricciardo (New Zealand) Liam Lawson (Japan) Yuki Tsunoda	1–10; 11–13, 18–22 (Note: Daniel Ricciardo was entered into the Dutch Grand Prix, but later withdrew following a crash in second practice in which he broke a metacarpal bone.); 13–17; All
(France) BWT Alpine F1 Team	Alpine-Renault	A523	Renault E-Tech RE23	10; 31	(France) Pierre Gasly (France) Esteban Ocon	All; All
(United Kingdom) Aston Martin Aramco Cognizant F1 Team	Aston Martin Aramco-Mercedes	AMR23	Mercedes-AMG F1 M14	14; 18	(Spain) Fernando Alonso (Canada) Lance Stroll	All; All (Note: Lance Stroll was entered into the Singapore Grand Prix, but later withdrew following a crash in qualifying.)
(Italy) Scuderia Ferrari	Ferrari	SF-23	Ferrari 066/10	16; 55	(Monaco) Charles Leclerc (Spain) Carlos Sainz Jr.	All; All
(United States) MoneyGram Haas F1 Team	Haas-Ferrari	VF-23	Ferrari 066/10	20; 27	(Denmark) Kevin Magnussen (Germany) Nico Hülkenberg	All; All
(United Kingdom) McLaren Formula 1 Team	McLaren-Mercedes	MCL60	Mercedes-AMG F1 M14	4; 81	(United Kingdom) Lando Norris (Australia) Oscar Piastri	All; All
(Germany) Mercedes-AMG Petronas F1 Team	Mercedes	F1 W14	Mercedes-AMG F1 M14	44; 63	(United Kingdom) Lewis Hamilton (United Kingdom) George Russell	All; All
(Austria) Oracle Red Bull Racing	Red Bull Racing-Honda RBPT	RB19	Honda RBPTH001	1; 11	(Netherlands) Max Verstappen (Mexico) Sergio Pérez	All; All
(United Kingdom) Williams Racing	Williams-Mercedes	FW45	Mercedes-AMG F1 M14	2; 23	(United States) Logan Sargeant (Thailand) Alexander Albon	All; All

=== Free practice drivers ===
Throughout the season, each team had to field a driver in one of the first two free practice sessions who had not competed in more than two races, on two occasions, once for each car. The Grand Prix debuts of Oscar Piastri, Logan Sargeant and Nyck de Vries at the Bahrain Grand Prix each counted as one of the mandatory sessions for McLaren-Mercedes, Williams-Mercedes and AlphaTauri-Honda RBPT, respectively. Liam Lawson's debut at the Dutch Grand Prix did not count, as Nyck de Vries had already taken the mandatory free practice slot for that car.

Drivers that took part in first or second free practice sessions
Constructor	Practice drivers		
Constructor	No.	Driver name	Rounds
Alfa Romeo-Ferrari	98	(France) Théo Pourchaire	19, 22
AlphaTauri-Honda RBPT	41	(France) Isack Hadjar	19
Alpine-Renault	61	(Australia) Jack Doohan	19, 22
Aston Martin Aramco-Mercedes	34	(Brazil) Felipe Drugovich	14, 22
Ferrari	39	(Israel) Robert Shwartzman	13, 22
Haas-Ferrari	50	(Great Britain) Oliver Bearman	19, 22
McLaren-Mercedes	29	(Mexico) Patricio O'Ward	22
Mercedes	42	(Denmark) Frederik Vesti	19, 22
Red Bull Racing-Honda RBPT	36; 37	(Great Britain) Jake Dennis (France) Isack Hadjar	22; 22
Williams-Mercedes	45	(Great Britain) Zak O'Sullivan	22

=== Team changes ===
Honda returned as a named engine supplier to Red Bull Racing and AlphaTauri, with both teams badging the engines as Honda RBPT. While Red Bull Powertrains had planned to take over assembly and maintenance of the engines from this season onward, it was later agreed that Honda would continue its technical support of Red Bull Racing and AlphaTauri until the end of 2025.

=== Driver changes ===
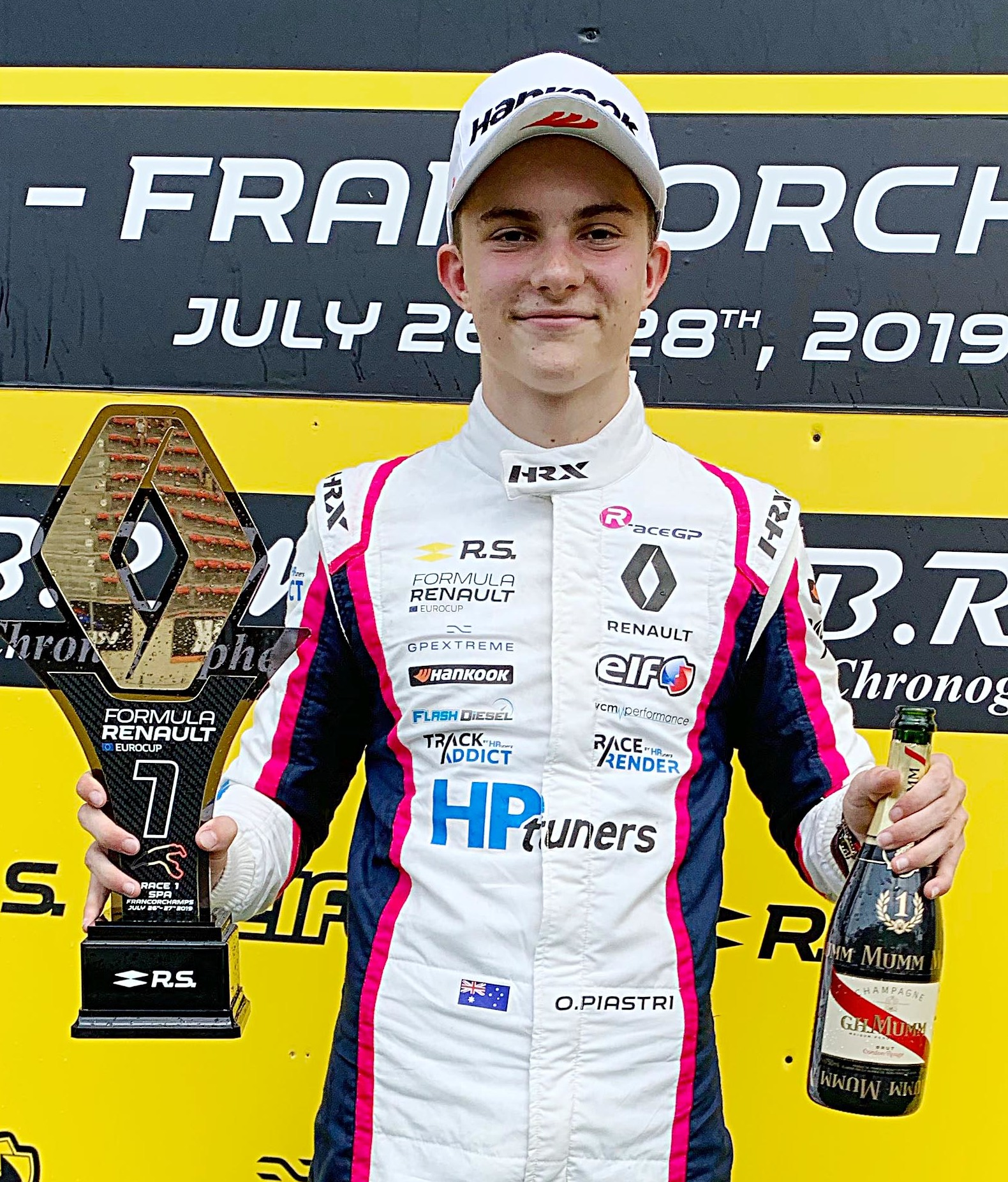
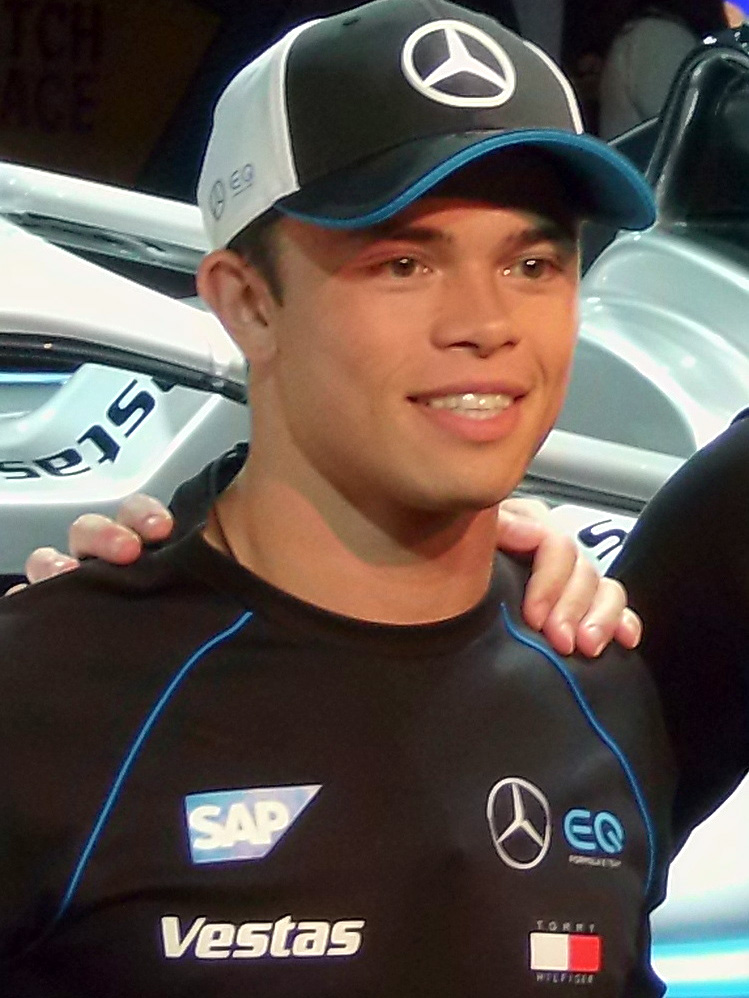
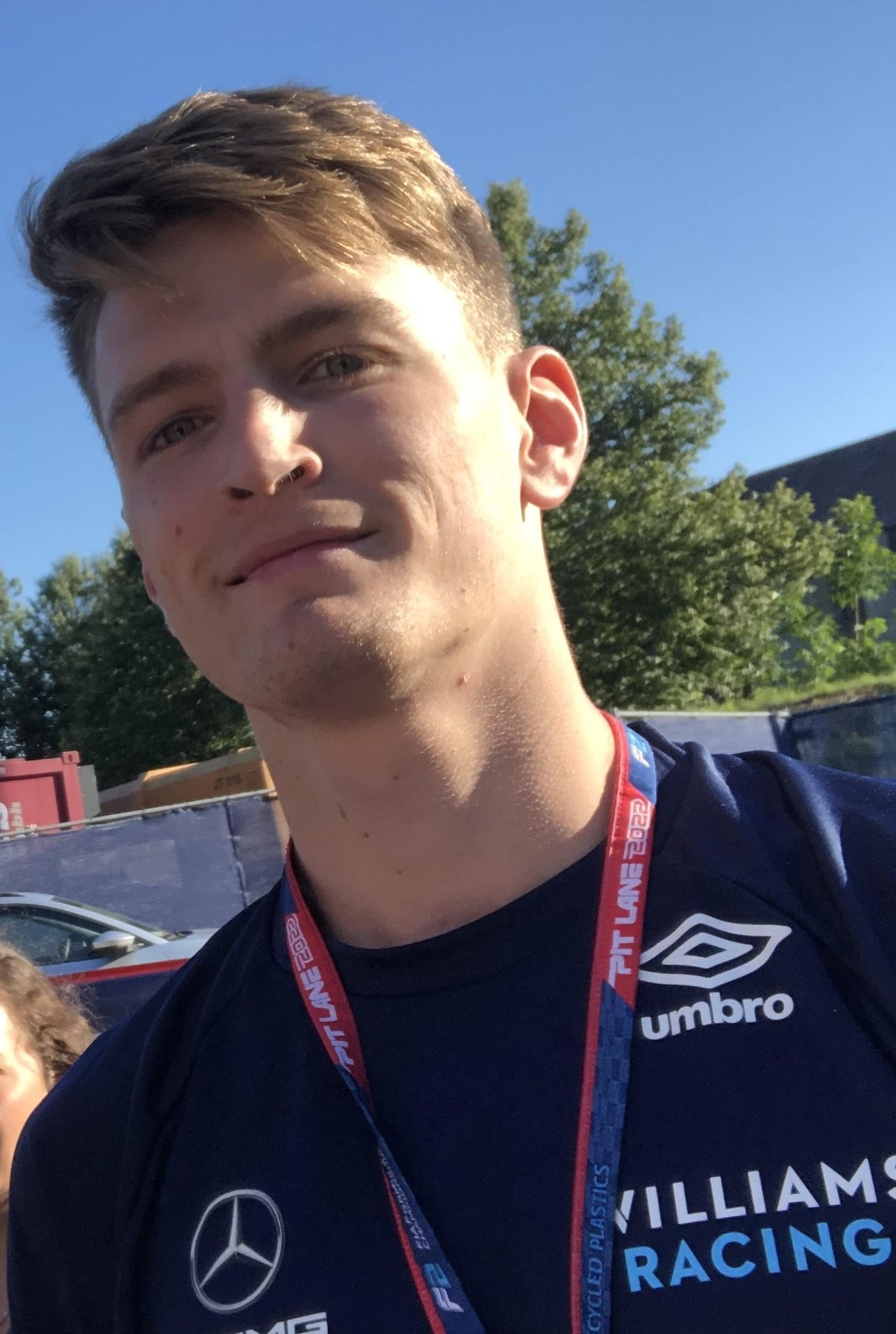
Oscar Piastri (left), Nyck de Vries (centre) and Logan Sargeant (right) made their debuts with McLaren, AlphaTauri and Williams, respectively.

Sebastian Vettel retired from the sport at the end of the 2022 championship, ending his Formula One career after 15 full seasons. His place at Aston Martin was taken by Fernando Alonso, who left Alpine after two seasons. Alonso's replacement was initially announced as the 2021 Formula 2 Champion and Alpine reserve driver, Oscar Piastri. Shortly after this announcement, Piastri stated that he had not signed a contract for 2023 and that he would not be driving for Alpine. The FIA Contract Recognition Board ruled that he did not have any contractual obligations to race for Alpine. Pierre Gasly, who initially had a contract to drive for AlphaTauri, moved to Alpine, replacing Alonso. Gasly was replaced by the 2020–21 Formula E and 2019 Formula 2 Champion Nyck de Vries.

Daniel Ricciardo left McLaren after two seasons. Although he had a contract to drive for the team in 2023, it was terminated during the 2022 championship by mutual agreement. Ricciardo's seat was filled by Piastri, who made his Formula One debut. Nicholas Latifi left Williams after spending three seasons with the team. His seat was filled by Logan Sargeant, who graduated from Formula 2, making his Formula One debut and becoming the first American Formula One driver to compete since Alexander Rossi in 2015. Mick Schumacher left Haas after two seasons. His seat was taken by Nico Hülkenberg, who last competed in Formula One as a full-time race driver in 2019 with former team Renault.

==== Mid-season changes ====
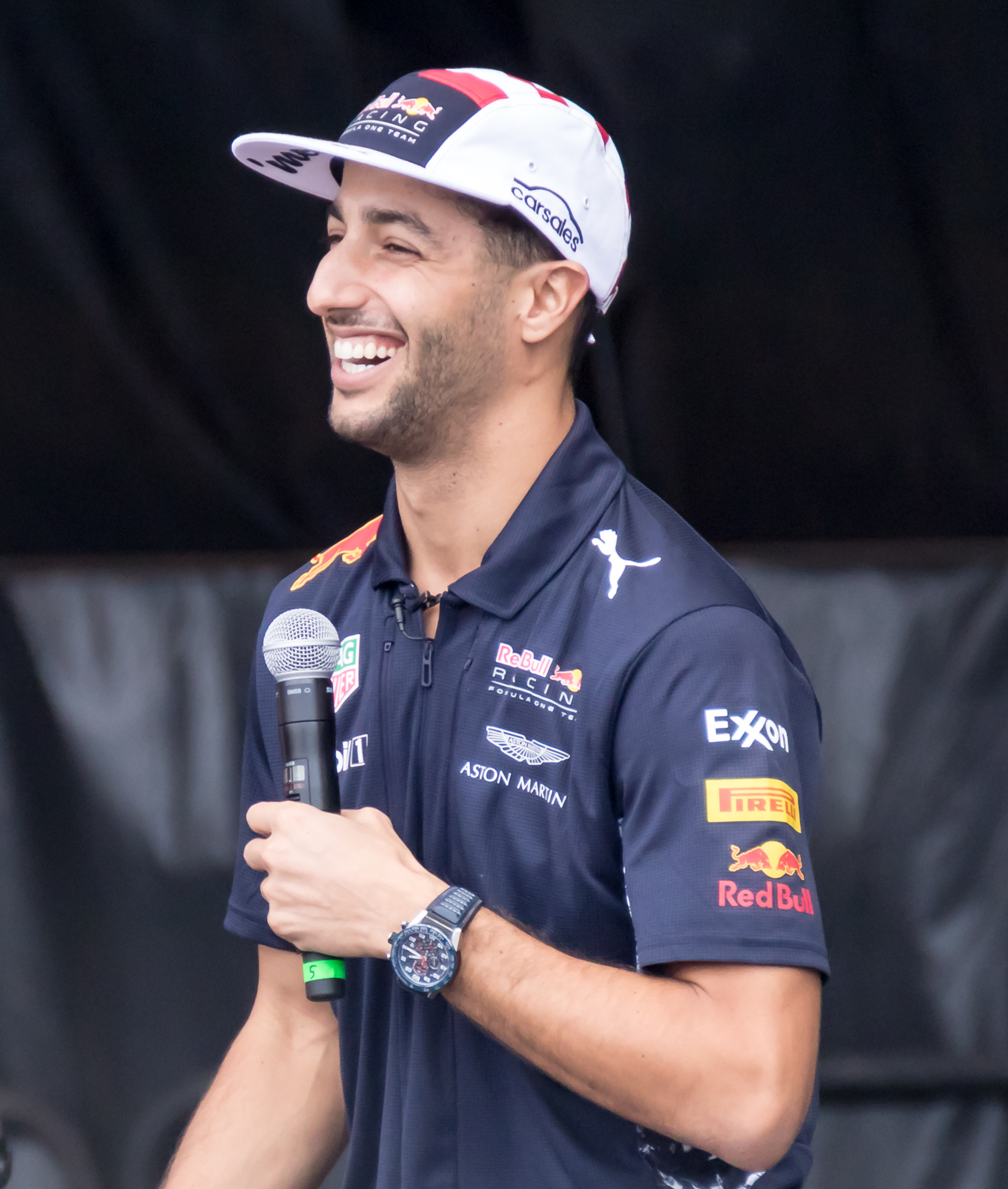
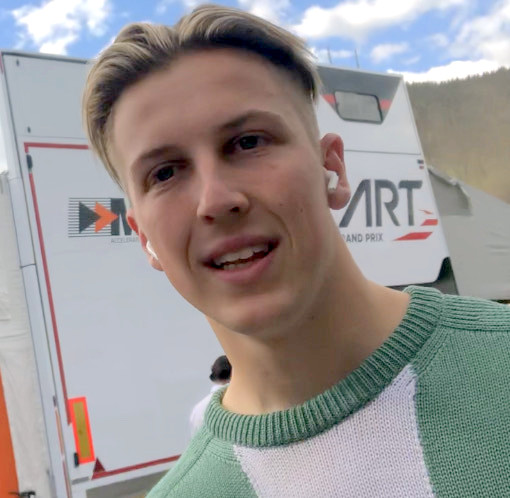
Daniel Ricciardo (left) and debutant Liam Lawson (right) drove for AlphaTauri after Nyck de Vries' departure.

Nyck de Vries was relieved of his driving duties for AlphaTauri after underperforming in the first ten races of his rookie season. His seat was filled by Daniel Ricciardo starting from the Hungarian Grand Prix. Ricciardo had previously raced with the team in 2012 and 2013, when it was known as Toro Rosso. During second practice for the Dutch Grand Prix, his third race of the season, Ricciardo broke a metacarpal bone in his left hand in a crash. As a result, Red Bull Racing and AlphaTauri's reserve driver Liam Lawson substituted for Ricciardo, making his Formula One debut. Lawson continued to substitute in for Ricciardo at the Italian, Singapore, Japanese and Qatar Grands Prix before Ricciardo returned for the United States Grand Prix.

== Calendar ==
The 2023 calendar comprised twenty-two Grands Prix. The Azerbaijan, Austrian, Belgian, Qatar, United States and São Paulo Grands Prix featured the sprint format.

Round	Grand Prix	Circuit	Race date
1	Bahrain Grand Prix	Bahrain International Circuit, Sakhir	5 March
2	Saudi Arabian Grand Prix	(Saudi Arabia) Jeddah Corniche Circuit, Jeddah	19 March
3	Australian Grand Prix	(Australia) Albert Park Circuit, Melbourne	2 April
4	Azerbaijan Grand Prix	(Azerbaijan) Baku City Circuit, Baku	30 April
5	Miami Grand Prix	(United States) Miami International Autodrome, Miami Gardens, Florida	7 May
6	Monaco Grand Prix	Circuit de Monaco, Monaco	28 May
7	Spanish Grand Prix	(Spain) Circuit de Barcelona-Catalunya, Montmeló	4 June
8	Canadian Grand Prix	(Canada) Circuit Gilles Villeneuve, Montreal	18 June
9	Austrian Grand Prix	(Austria) Red Bull Ring, Spielberg	2 July
10	British Grand Prix	(United Kingdom) Silverstone Circuit, Silverstone	9 July
11	Hungarian Grand Prix	(Hungary) Hungaroring, Mogyoród	23 July
12	Belgian Grand Prix	(Belgium) Circuit de Spa-Francorchamps, Stavelot	30 July
13	Dutch Grand Prix	(Netherlands) Circuit Zandvoort, Zandvoort	27 August
14	Italian Grand Prix	(Italy) Monza Circuit, Monza	3 September
15	Singapore Grand Prix	Marina Bay Street Circuit, Singapore	17 September
16	Japanese Grand Prix	(Japan) Suzuka International Racing Course, Suzuka	24 September
17	Qatar Grand Prix	(Qatar) Lusail International Circuit, Lusail	8 October
18	United States Grand Prix	(United States) Circuit of the Americas, Austin, Texas	22 October
19	Mexico City Grand Prix	Autódromo Hermanos Rodríguez, Mexico City	29 October
20	São Paulo Grand Prix	(Brazil) Interlagos Circuit, São Paulo	5 November
21	Las Vegas Grand Prix	(United States) Las Vegas Strip Circuit, Paradise, Nevada	18 November (Note: Saturday race.)
22	Abu Dhabi Grand Prix	(United Arab Emirates) Yas Marina Circuit, Abu Dhabi	26 November

=== Calendar changes ===
The Qatar Grand Prix returned to the calendar, having not been held in 2022 to allow Qatar to prepare to host the 2022 FIFA World Cup. When the Qatar Grand Prix was first announced in 2021, the event was scheduled to take place at an undisclosed location, with a new circuit in the planning stages. The publication of the season calendar showed that the event would remain at the Lusail International Circuit. The Las Vegas Grand Prix made its debut, with the race held in November on a new street track featuring the Las Vegas Strip. The last Grand Prix held in Las Vegas was the 1982 Caesars Palace Grand Prix. The addition of the Las Vegas Grand Prix meant the United States hosted three Formula One Grands Prix in a single season for the first time since 1982.

The Russian Grand Prix was under contract to feature on the 2023 calendar. It was originally meant to switch its venue from the Sochi Autodrom to Igora Drive, in Novozhilovo, located approximately 54 kilometres (34 mi) from Saint Petersburg. The contract was terminated in response to the Russian invasion of Ukraine. The French Grand Prix was removed from the calendar for 2023, the promoters of the Grand Prix stated that they would aim for a rotational race deal by sharing its slot with other Grands Prix.

The Chinese Grand Prix was initially due to be part of the calendar after last being held in 2019, it was cancelled for the fourth consecutive year due to the ongoing difficulties presented by the COVID-19 pandemic in the country. Formula One held discussions with venues to replace the Grand Prix, but this did not transipre.

The Emilia Romagna Grand Prix, which was scheduled to take place on 21 May as the sixth round of the championship, was cancelled on 17 May due to flooding in the area.

== Regulation changes ==
=== Technical regulations ===
==== Safety changes ====
Following dangerous amounts of porpoising during 2022, the FIA introduced changes to the regulations to limit the phenomenon. Floor edges were raised and the throat of the diffuser was also raised. The diffuser edge stiffness was increased and an additional sensor was mandated to monitor the porpoising phenomenon more effectively. Lateral floor deflection tests also became more stringent.

Following Zhou Guanyu's crash at the 2022 British Grand Prix, a rounded top would be required on the roll hoop, which reduces the chance of it digging into the ground during an accident. Additionally, a change was made to ensure a minimum height for the point of application of the homologation test, and a new physical homologation test was introduced where the load pushes the roll hoop in the forward direction, in addition to the pre-existing tests in three other directions. The size of the side-mirrors was increased from 150 mm × 50 mm (5.9 in × 2.0 in) to 200 mm × 60 mm (7.9 in × 2.4 in) in an effort to improve rear visibility.

==== Weight and fuel temperature ====
The allowed weight of cars was due to decrease from 798 kilograms (1,759 lb) to 796 kg (1,755 lb), but this plan was abandoned. The rules around minimum fuel temperature were changed. In 2022, minimum fuel temperature was 20 °C (68 °F). For 2023, the minimum fuel temperature was the lowest of either 10 °C (18 °F) below the ambient temperature, or 10 °C (50 °F).

==== Aerodynamics ====
The FIA initially altered the wording of the aerodynamic regulations after Mercedes produced a front wing that exploited a potential loop-hole in the regulations; Mercedes introduced slot gap separators on their front wings at the 2022 United States Grand Prix, although they did not intend to run them at the event. Rival teams argued that the new front wing was illegal, while Mercedes argued that the regulations allowed slot-gap separators as they were "primarily" there for "mechanical, structural or measurement reasons", and therefore any secondary aerodynamic benefit would be allowed. The FIA ruled that the brackets were illegal at the following 2022 Mexico City Grand Prix. The wording of the regulation was altered so that the slot gap separator brackets must perform a structural role, and the sentence explaining that the primary purpose can not be aerodynamic was removed. This rule change was intended to outlaw slot gap separators. It had the opposite effect, legalising slot gap separators which provide structural support; what aerodynamic benefit they provide no longer held any bearing on their legality. Ferrari launched their car, the SF-23 with the slot gap separators.

=== Sporting regulations ===
There were only three days of pre-season testing, a reduction from 2022 when there were six days. During the F1 Commission held in February 2023 it was decided to relax the restrictions on team radio communications. The FIA took further steps to relax COVID-19 safety protocols that were first introduced in 2020. This relaxation of restrictions included the removal of the need for proof of vaccination for those working in the paddock. The FIA previously dropped the requirements for mandatory face masking and COVID-testing in 2022.

==== Tyres ====
Pirelli announced a change to the available tyre compounds for 2023, as a new compound was inserted between the old C1 and C2 compounds (the hardest two compounds of the 2022 range). This change provided teams with more flexible strategy options after criticism towards the original C1 compound for a large drop in grip compared to the other tyres. Additionally, following criticism over the raceability of its full wet tyre in previous seasons, Pirelli produced a new full wet tyre in the hope of reducing safety cars and red flags in wet race conditions. The new full wet tyre debuted at the Monaco Grand Prix.

With the intention of making tyre usage more sustainable in the future, Formula One trialed a reduction in allocated tyre sets from 13 to 11 at the Hungarian and Italian Grands Prix. It was due to be trialed at the Emilia Romagna Grand Prix before its cancellation. During qualifying for these races, teams were required to use the hard-compound tyres in the first segment of qualifying, the medium-coumpound in the second segment and the soft-compound in the third and final segment. Teams are usually free to choose the tyre compound that they run during qualifying.

==== Sprint events ====
The sprint format was held at six Grands Prix in 2023, compared to three in 2021 and 2022. During sprint weekends, teams were given a broader choice of parts that they are permitted to change under parc fermé conditions.

The event structure for sprint events was altered. Sprint weekends consisted of a single practice session on Friday, followed by the qualifying session which determined the grid for Sunday's Grand Prix. On Saturday, a new qualifying session called "sprint shootout", in place of the old second practice session, was run, determining the grid for the sprint which took place on Saturday afternoons. The Grand Prix took place on Sunday. The new sprint shootout qualifying was shorter than traditional qualifying: the first segment of sprint qualifying (SQ1) was 12 minutes, the second segment (SQ2) was 10 minutes, and the third segment (SQ3) was 8 minutes long, down from 18, 15 and 12 minutes respectively for qualifying for the Grand Prix. New tyres were mandatory for each phase, with a single set of mediums for each of SQ1 and SQ2, and a single set of softs for SQ3.

The tyre rules for sprint shootout were modified for the second sprint weekend of the season at the Austrian Grand Prix, enabling drivers and teams who made it through to SQ3 to use any set of soft tyres, whereas they were previously required to use a new set of soft tyres. The change was made after Lando Norris could not run in SQ3 at the Azerbaijan Grand Prix due to exhausting his allocation of soft tyres. (Note: Theoretically, Lando Norris could have run intermediate or full wet tyres during the dry SQ3 session.)

==== Points ====
The 2022 sporting regulations specified that only races which were ended early by a red flag used a points system that gradually increased points awarded based on the completed race distance. This caused confusion at the 2022 Japanese Grand Prix, where full points were awarded despite less than 75% of the scheduled distance being completed, as the race ended under green flag conditions. The wording of the regulation was amended: all races where less than 75% of the race distance is completed would use the sliding scale system to determine the points awarded, regardless of whether they finished under red or green flag conditions. This rule change satisfied the original intention of the gradual scale points system when it was introduced in 2022.

==== Political gestures ====
The FIA's International Sporting Code (ISC) (Note: The International Sporting Code (ISC) applies to all FIA sanctioned events, not just Formula One.) was updated to include stricter controls on drivers and teams making "political, religious and personal statements". Article 12.2.1n was introduced stating that drivers and teams must receive the FIA's permission before conducting a political statement or protest and that any protest without permission would be considered a breach of the FIA's neutrality rules. The FIA stated the update to the ISC was done to move it in line with the ethical principles of political neutrality laid out by the International Olympic Committee, which gave formal recognition to the FIA in 2013 through the Olympic Charter. FIA President Mohammed Ben Sulayem stated that the rule change was made to ensure that the FIA's platform was not used to help fulfil drivers' "private personal agenda".

Following concerns from drivers and teams on how these rules would affect freedom of expression and the ability of drivers and their teams to express views about what they believe to be a worthwhile cause, the FIA clarified in February 2023 that drivers would be prohibited on making political or religious statement on the following: politically sensitive persons living or dead, military or political conflicts, separatist movements, national governments, any statements referencing a key religious figure or any statement that could be deemed offensive to the religious beliefs of the hosting country. Stewards at each Grand Prix meeting will be required to adjudge whether a driver has breached FIA neutrality rules on a case-by-case basis. Drivers remained free to share their opinions regarding political or religious topics without facing potential sanctions on their personal social media platforms or in an official FIA press conference providing it was in response to a media question or outside of a race weekend. Any driver looking for a special exemption from the FIA to make a statement that may contravene the neutrality rules must have notify the FIA four weeks in advance of an event.

=== Financial regulations ===
The budget cap was reduced to 135 million United States dollars. It was originally set at US$140 million in 2022 before being increased to US$142.5 million to account for inflation. It was initially agreed by the F1 Commission to increase the cost cap by US$1.2 million to account for additional costs caused by the increased number of races. The commission subsequently agreed to adjust to the level of future cost cap increases to US$1.8 million per race when a calendar is over twenty-one races to account for the greater costs of flyaway races compared to European races. Teams also agreed to give the FIA easier access to factories when cost cap audits are being carried out in order to more easily ensure that teams adhere to the cost cap. A winter shutdown of factories was introduced alongside the existing summer shutdown.

==== "Special project" divisions ====
Teams such as Mercedes, Red Bull Racing, and Aston Martin operated "applied technology" divisions which design for and consult on projects outside of Formula One. Since these projects were not related to the teams' Formula One operations, their expenditure fell outside of the cost cap regulations. Between the Canadian and Austrian Grands Prix, the FIA introduced a technical directive that prevented teams from transferring intellectual property from their "special project" divisions to their Formula One operations cost-free, closing a loophole.

== Season summary ==
=== Pre-season ===
There was one pre-season test, at the Bahrain International Circuit in Sakhir from 23 to 25 February. Aston Martin driver Lance Stroll missed the test after suffering a "minor" cycling accident during training. He was replaced by reserve driver Felipe Drugovich. Red Bull Racing's Sergio Pérez set the fastest time of the test, while Scuderia AlphaTauri logged the greatest distance.

=== Opening rounds ===
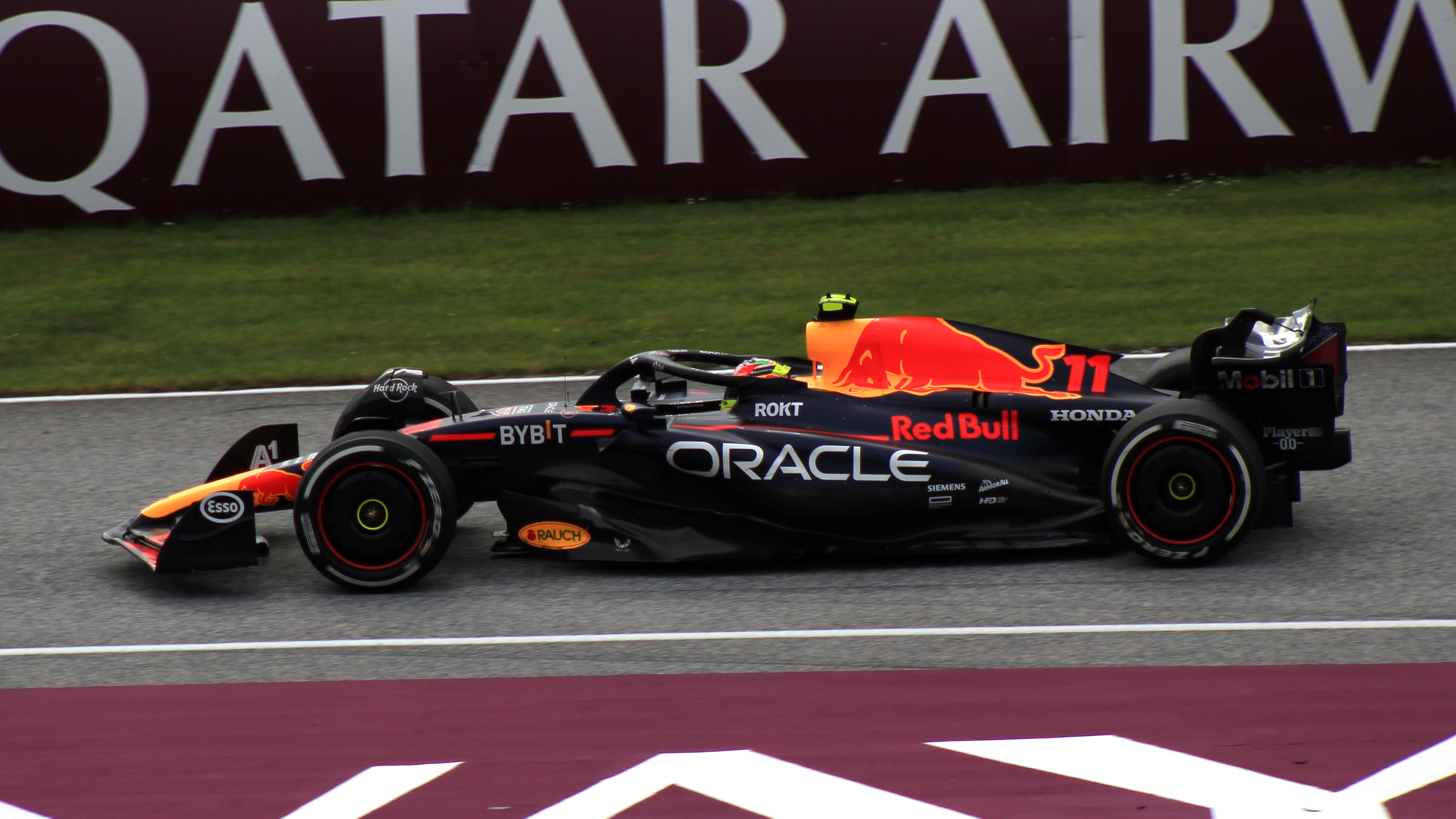
Sergio Pérez (pictured at the Austrian Grand Prix) and Max Verstappen each took two victories across the first four rounds.

Red Bull Racing locked out the front row for the season opening Bahrain Grand Prix, with the two Ferraris on the second row. The much-improved Aston Martin of Fernando Alonso started in fifth. Max Verstappen led most of the race comfortably, winning by eleven seconds ahead of his teammate Sergio Pérez. Charles Leclerc retired with a mechanical failure from third, with Alonso taking this spot. After a late race overtake on Carlos Sainz Jr., Lewis Hamilton finished fifth. Lance Stroll, still racing with a broken wrist and toe, finished sixth, ahead of the Mercedes of George Russell. The points paying positions were rounded out by Valtteri Bottas (Alfa Romeo), Pierre Gasly (Alpine) and Alex Albon (Williams). The result gave Verstappen a 7-point lead in the Drivers' standings, and Red Bull a 20-point lead in the Constructors' standings.

At the Saudi Arabian Grand Prix, Pérez took pole position in qualifying. Championship leader Verstappen suffered a broken drive shaft in qualifying, leaving him in 15th for the start. Pérez lost first place on the first lap to Alonso, but regained it on lap four. Verstappen, starting fifteenth on the grid, reached second by lap 25, and remained there for the rest of the race. Alonso finished third - his 100th podium, with the Mercedes duo of Russell and Hamilton finishing in fourth and fifth respectively. Leclerc and Magnussen took their first points of the season, in seventh and tenth respectively. Magnussen's tenth was also Haas' first points of the campaign. Verstappen took the bonus point for the fastest lap, allowing him to retain the Championship lead by a single point over Pérez. Red Bull extended their championship lead to 49 points.

At the Australian Grand Prix, Verstappen took pole position, while Pérez's qualifying ended with a spin. He elected to take new power unit components and started the race in the pit lane. At the start of the race, Verstappen was overtaken by Russell and Hamilton. He regained the lead by lap 12 and led the race comfortably, as Russell retired on lap 18 due to a mechanical issue. Verstappen won the race, followed by Hamilton, Alonso and Stroll, with Pérez finishing fifth with the fastest lap. The Grand Prix broke the record for most red flags, with three, the first following a crash with Alexander Albon, the second following a crash with Kevin Magnussen, and a third following a multi car collision at the restart. The result saw McLaren and Scuderia AlphaTauri score their first points of the season; the McLaren drivers of Lando Norris and Oscar Piastri finished in sixth and eighth respectively, and AlphaTauri's Yuki Tsunoda finished tenth. Following the race, Verstappen's lead was 15 points over Pérez, and Red Bull's lead was 58 points.

The Azerbaijan Grand Prix saw the season's first sprint event. Leclerc secured pole position for both the sprint, and the Grand Prix. Leclerc lead the sprint from pole until Pérez took the lead on the main straight on lap 7, courtesy of the DRS; Pérez kept the lead until the end of the sprint. Leclerc held on to second, Verstappen finished in third, Russell fourth. In the Grand Prix, polesitter Leclerc led the early part of the race. The DRS was enabled on lap three, with Verstappen utilising it to pass Leclerc into the first corner on the following lap. Pérez repeated the same move on lap six to take second place. Verstappen lost the race lead through the pitstop phase, with Pérez making his stop under safety car conditions. Pérez, Verstappen and Leclerc were the top three drivers for the rest of the race as Pérez took his second Azerbaijan Grand Prix victory. This was Leclerc and Ferrari's first podium finish of the season. Following the race, Verstappen's championship lead was cut to six points, with Red Bull extending their championship lead to 93.

At the Miami Grand Prix, Pérez secured pole position ahead of Alonso, Sainz and Magnussen. Verstappen started ninth after failing to set a representative lap time during the final segment of qualifying; Verstappen made an error on his first attempt, his second attempt was curtailed by a red flag, following a crash by Leclerc. In the race, Verstappen was able to quickly overtake cars to bring himself into second, behind Pérez, by lap 17. Verstappen took the lead when Pérez made his pitstop on lap 20, with Pérez inheriting the lead back on lap 45 when Verstappen pitted. Verstappen executed an overtake for the lead on lap 47, before pulling away to take the win, with the fastest lap. The top three was completed by Pérez and Alonso. Following Verstappen's win, he extended his championship lead to 14 points, with Red Bull extending their lead to 122 points.

Verstappen secured pole position at the Monaco Grand Prix, ahead of Alonso, Leclerc and Alpine's Esteban Ocon who were all on provisional pole at some point during Q3. Leclerc was penalised with a three-place grid penalty after impeding McLaren's Lando Norris in qualifying. Pérez crashed in the first part of qualifying, and subsequently started 20th. The race started in dry conditions, with Verstappen able to establish a ten-second lead by lap 40. Rain started to fall over the following laps with drivers switching to the intermediate-weather compounds across laps 50 to 55, with some drivers later elected to switch to the new full-wet tyres. Verstappen was able to maintain his lead and secured his second Monaco Grand Prix victory, with Alonso finishing second, his best result of the season. Ocon scored his first podium since winning the 2021 Hungarian Grand Prix in third. Pérez was 16th. Verstappen and Red Bull were able to extend their championship leads to 39 and 129 points respectively.

Verstappen secured pole position at the Spanish Grand Prix, ahead of Sainz and Norris. Leclerc, who started the previous year's Spanish Grand Prix on pole, could only qualify 19th, and started from the pit lane after the team elected to make changes to his set-up. Pérez, who was second in the Championship, qualified 11th. Verstappen won the race comfortably ahead of the Mercedes duo of Hamilton and Russell (who started 12th) and Pérez. On his way to victory, Verstappen led every lap, and set the fastest lap, for his third career grand slam. The result meant Verstappen increased his championship lead to 53 points, and Red Bull extended theirs to 135. The double podium for Mercedes moved them to second in the Constructors' Championship, ahead of Aston Martin.

=== Mid-season rounds ===
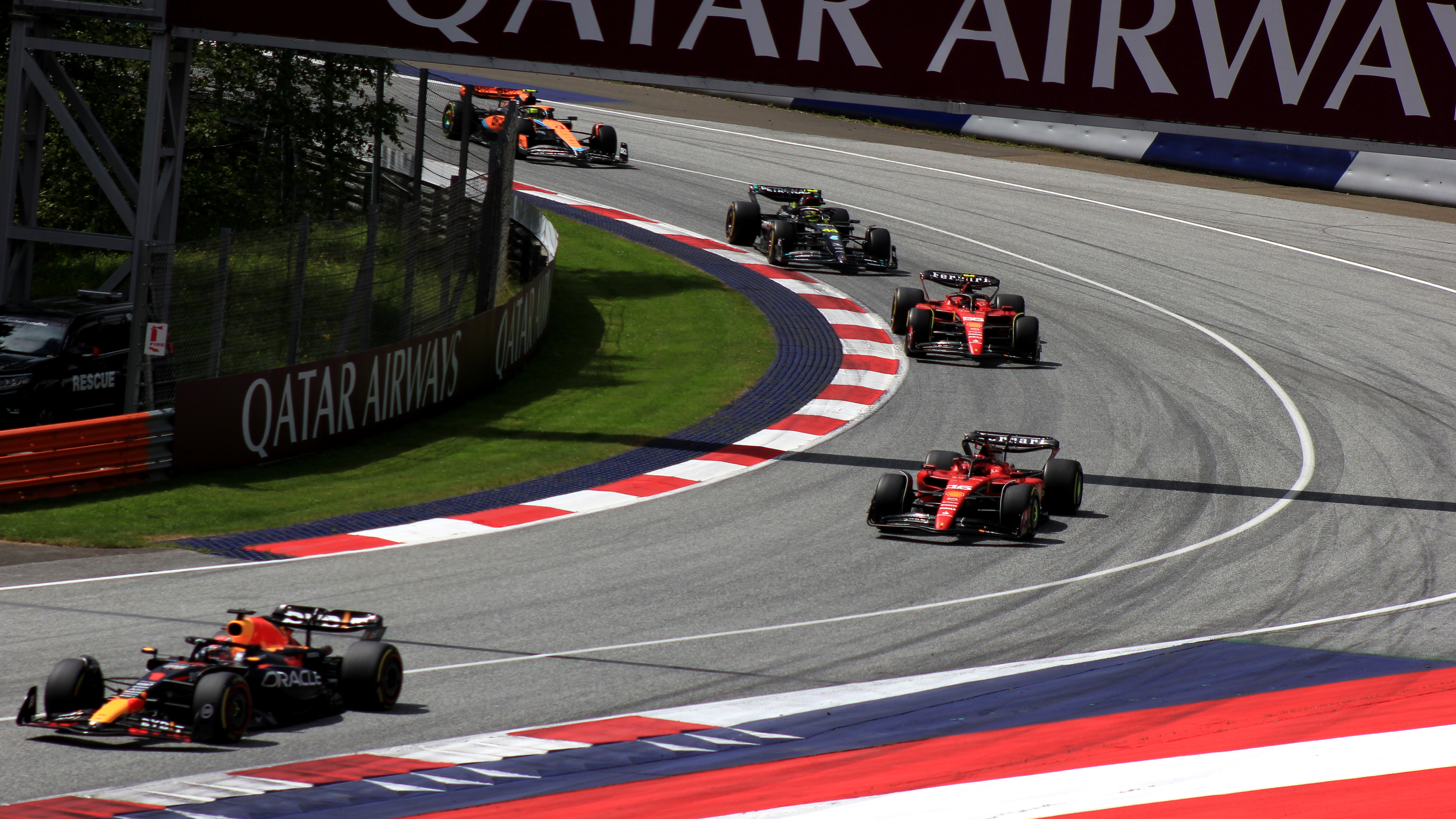
Eventual race winner Max Verstappen leading at the Austrian Grand Prix. It would be his fifth victory in a record-breaking streak of ten consecutive race wins.

At the Canadian Grand Prix, Verstappen secured pole position in rainy conditions ahead of the Haas of Nico Hülkenberg and Alonso; Hülkenberg was demoted to fifth following a penalty. Pérez failed to accurately assess the conditions, qualifying in 12th. Verstappen went on to dominate the race, taking Red Bull Racing's 100th victory in Formula One ahead of Alonso and Hamilton who had a tight battle for the final podium position. Russell was fourth. Verstappen's 41st victory moved him to joint fifth on the all-time list, tied with Ayrton Senna. Red Bull's championship lead was extended to 154 points, Verstappen's lead to 69.

Verstappen also took pole at the Austrian Grand Prix, both for Sunday's Grand Prix and for Saturday's sprint. Pérez briefly took the lead at the start of the sprint before Verstappen successfully overtook him at turn 3 on the opening lap. Verstappen would lead every lap to take victory. Pérez dropped to third behind Hülkenberg, before overtaking him around the halfway point on his way to second. Sainz was third. In the Grand Prix Verstappen pulled away from Leclerc and Sainz who qualified second and third. Leclerc would briefly lead the race after opting to pit under a virtual safety car, whilst Verstappen did not. Leclerc became the first driver since Pérez at the Miami Grand Prix to lead a lap other than Verstappen, who quickly passed Leclerc to regain the lead. Verstappen took his fifth consecutive victory ahead of Leclerc, who scored his best finish of the season, and Pérez, who recovered from starting 15th. Verstappen and Red Bull extended their respective leads to 81 and 199 points.

The British Grand Prix saw an improvement from McLaren, who brought car updates to the event, as Lando Norris and Oscar Piastri qualified in second and third, respectively. Verstappen took his fifth consecutive pole position, whilst Pérez qualified 16th, failing to make it into the final part of qualifying for the fifth consecutive race. Norris made the most of a good start and overtook Verstappen into the first corner. Verstappen re-passed Norris on lap 5 and held on to take his sixth consecutive Grand Prix victory, whilst Norris recorded his best finish of the season finishing second. Hamilton made the most of a safety car to jump Piastri and finish in third place, a record-extending 14th podium at one venue. Pérez finished sixth. The result saw the lead in the Drivers' Championship extend to 99 points and the lead in the Constructors' Championship extend to 208 points.

The Hungarian Grand Prix saw Nyck de Vries replaced with Daniel Ricciardo due to poor performances. Hamilton took pole position, his first since the 2021 Saudi Arabian Grand Prix. It marked his ninth pole position in Hungary, a record for most poles at a single circuit. Verstappen qualified second with Norris third. Hamilton lost out at the start to Verstappen, and was passed by the two McLarens of Norris and Piastri. Verstappen won to become the fifth driver to win seven races consecutively. Hamilton passed Piastri late in the race and finished fourth, with Pérez jumping the pair into third from ninth with Norris in second. Red Bull Racing set a new record for most consecutive victories for a constructor with twelve, beating the mark of 11 set by McLaren in 1988. Verstappen's lead was extended to 110 points, with Red Bull leading the Constructors' Championship by 229 points.

The Belgian Grand Prix saw the return of the sprint format, with Verstappen being the fastest qualifier for both the Grand Prix and sprint race. He was given a five-place grid penalty for the Grand Prix for exceeding the allocated number of gearboxes, so Leclerc was promoted to pole in his place. A rain shower postponed the start of the sprint by 30 minutes, with the sprint starting behind the safety car and all drivers on the full-wet tyres. Most of the field changed to the intermediate-wets when the safety car pulled in, with others, including Verstappen electing to stay out. Verstappen instead changed tyres on the following lap, but lost a position to Piastri, would have pitted a lap earlier. Verstappen was able to chase Piastri down and overtake him for the sprint win. In the race, Pérez took the lead from Leclerc on lap 1. Verstappen then overtook Leclerc on lap 9, putting him in second. He was then able to chase down and overtake Pérez for the lead by lap 17. From there Verstappen was able to pull away to victory from Pérez and Leclerc. The result allowed Verstappen to extend his lead to 125, and Red Bull extended their lead to 256.

At the Dutch Grand Prix, Daniel Ricciardo suffered a broken metacarpal bone in a crash while trying to avoid the McLaren of Piastri who had crashed ahead of him. As a result, Ricciardo withdrew from the weekend, being replaced by Red Bull Junior Team driver Liam Lawson. Verstappen took pole for the third year running in Zandvoort, with Norris in second and Russell in third. Rain fell on the first lap, which saw drivers pit for inters in the early stages. As a result of the early change in tyres, Pérez led by lap 5, from the Alfa Romeo of Zhou Guanyu and Gasly. Verstappen undercut Pérez on the change back to dry-weather tyres on lap 13. From there, he kept the lead for the rest of the race. More rain fell in the closing stages, with multiple drivers being caught out by the tricky conditions at turn 1. Pérez went off, glancing the barrier and losing second place to Alonso. Pérez was able to hold onto third on track but a five-second time penalty for speeding in the pit lane promoted Pierre Gasly to his first podium since the 2021 Azerbaijan Grand Prix. Following the round, Verstappen led the Drivers' Championship by 138 points, and Red Bull led the Constructors' Championship by 285 points.

At the Italian Grand Prix, Carlos Sainz Jr. achieved pole, his first of the year, ahead of Verstappen and teammate Leclerc. In the race, Sainz mounted a successful defense against an attacking Max Verstappen for the lead, before making a mistake breaking into turn one on lap 15, allowing Verstappen into the lead. Excluding pit stop lead changes, Verstappen kept the lead until the end of the race, winning his second consecutive Italian Grand Prix, breaking Sebastian Vettel's record for most consecutive wins with ten. Further back, Russell and Pérez fought for fourth, with Pérez winning out, and eventually joining Sainz and Leclerc in a fight for second. Pérez would win this battle, coming home in second ahead of Sainz and Leclerc. Russell came home in fifth, and Hamilton sixth. The result saw Red Bull and Verstappen extend their respective leads to 310 and 145.

=== Closing rounds ===
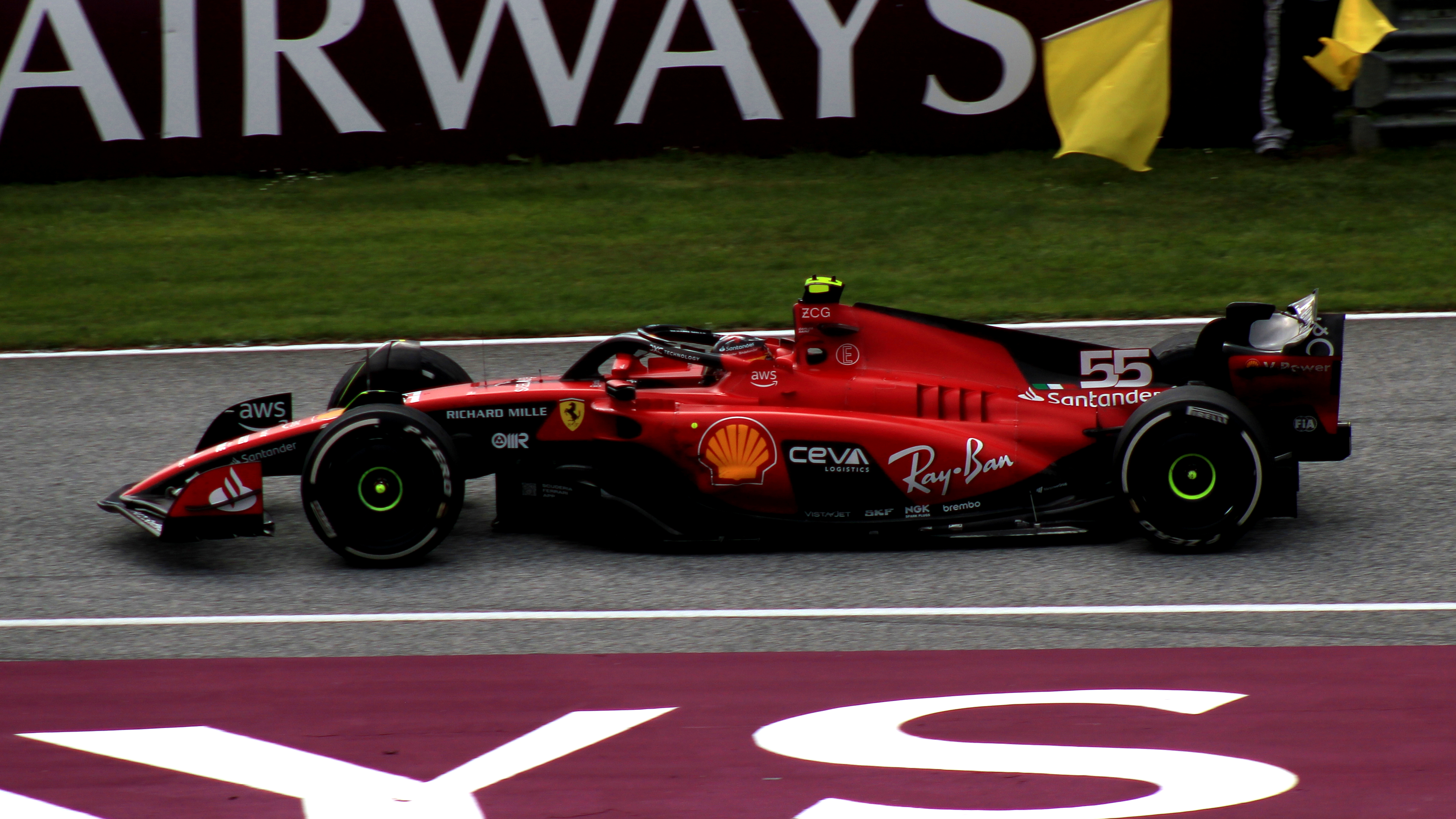
The Singapore Grand Prix was won by Carlos Sainz Jr. of Ferrari (pictured at the Austrian Grand Prix). It was the only Grand Prix not won by Red Bull Racing.

Sainz took his second pole positions of the season at the Singapore Grand Prix, qualifying ahead of Russell and Leclerc. Red Bull Racing struggled all weekend, with Verstappen and Pérez lining up eleventh and thirteenth, respectively. This was the first time Red Bull Racing failed to make the final segment of qualifying since the 2018 Russian Grand Prix. Sainz held the lead at the start, as Leclerc passed Russell at turn 1. A safety car was brought out after Logan Sargeant crashed his Williams, resulting in most of the cars making pitstops. Leclerc had to be held longer in the pits to allow other cars to pass, seeing him drop to fifth. Sainz would hold off the pressure from both Russell and Norris to take his second Formula One victory. Russell crashed out from third on the final lap, promoting Hamilton to third. Leclerc would finish fourth, with Verstappen in fifth. Pérez, who was second in the championship, finished eighth. Sainz's win was the first for Ferrari since the 2022 Austrian Grand Prix, and ended Verstappen's record run of ten consecutive wins since the Miami Grand Prix and Red Bull Racing's record streak of fifteen wins since the 2022 Abu Dhabi Grand Prix. Verstappen extended his championship lead to 151 points, while Red Bull's lead shrank to 308.

Verstappen returned to pole at Suzuka for the Japanese Grand Prix, qualifying ahead of Piastri and Norris. Norris and Piastri both attacked Verstappen at the start, with Piastri going up the inside of turn one, and Norris attempting to go around the outside, with Verstappen able to hold onto the lead. Verstappen was able to pull away from the McLarens to win the race. At the start, Norris was able to take Piastri for second place. Piastri would regain second place by undercutting Norris before McLaren instructed Piastri to let Norris past, to allow the latter to attempt to attack Verstappen for the lead. Pérez, who was placed second in the championship, had started fifth, but a collision with Hamilton at the start warranted a front wing change, dropping him down the field. Pérez would make contact with Magnussen on lap 12, resulting in another front wing change, before electing to retire the car due to collision damage. Verstappen's win saw Red Bull Racing clinch the World Constructors' Championship for this season, their sixth overall and second consecutively. Verstappen's win also saw him extend his championship lead to 177 points over Pérez.

The Qatar Grand Prix saw an opportunity for Verstappen to win the title. Verstappen could win the title by finishing in the top six for the sprint, regardless of where Pérez finished. Oscar Piastri took the sprint pole, ahead of Norris, Verstappen and Russell and the Ferrari pair. The sprint saw split strategies amongst the drivers; Piastri, Norris and Verstappen elected for the medium compound tyres, while Russell, Sainz and Leclerc elected for the soft compound tyres. At the start, the soft shod trio of Russell, Sainz and Leclerc managed to make their way past Verstappen and Norris, with Piastri able to hold the lead before a safety car intervention. When the race restarted, Russell overtook Piastri for the lead. The second half of the race saw a drop off in tyre performance for Russell, Sainz and Leclerc, in which they were re-overtaken by Piastri, Verstappen and Norris. Piastri went on to win his first race, and McLaren's first sprint victory, finishing ahead of Verstappen and Norris. With this result, Verstappen secured his third consecutive Drivers' Championship, also achieving the distinction of having secured a World Championship on a Saturday (the same feat having previously been achieved by Juan Manuel Fangio in 1955, Jack Brabham in 1959, Graham Hill in 1962, Nelson Piquet in 1981 and 1983, and Keke Rosberg in 1982). Verstappen managed to secure pole position for the Grand Prix, ahead of the Mercedes duo of Hamilton and Russell. On lap 1, Hamilton collided with Russell, immediately resulting in a retirement for Hamilton and forcing Russell to make an early pitstop for damage repairs. The race was dominated by Verstappen ahead of Piastri and Norris. McLaren set a new record for the fastest pit stop, clocking in at 1.80 seconds, beating the previous record of 1.82 seconds, set by Red Bull at the 2019 Brazilian Grand Prix. The race took place in extremely hot weather, which caught out numerous drivers, including Logan Sargeant, who retired early due to heat exhaustion, Esteban Ocon, who vomited in his car twice but managed to finish the race in seventh, and Lance Stroll, who stated he briefly passed out and experienced blurry vision.

The United States Grand Prix marked back-to-back sprint events, with Verstappen qualifying on pole for the sprint. Hamilton and Leclerc were able to challenge Verstappen for the lead into the first turn, but Verstappen was able to stay in first. Hamilton was able to stay with Verstappen in the early stages, with Verstappen pulling away in the second half. Leclerc finished third, with Norris fourth. Leclerc qualified on pole ahead of Norris and Hamilton for the Grand Prix. Verstappen had set a lap time fast enough for pole, but it was deleted due to a track limits violation; Verstappen would start in sixth. Norris was able to pass Leclerc on lap one, with Hamilton passing Leclerc for second a few laps later. Verstappen was able to overtake Leclerc for third by lap 11. Verstappen would cycle ahead of Hamilton courtesy of an undercut, and overtook Norris for the lead on lap 29. Hamilton and Norris temporarily lost places to Leclerc as they made their second pitstops, as Leclerc opted for a one-stop strategy, but were able to make those positions back up. Norris and Hamilton chased down Verstappen for the race lead but would be unsuccessful, with Verstappen winning, Hamilton crossing the line in second, and Norris third. Post-race scrutineering determined that Hamilton and Leclerc's skid blocks were excessively worn, disqualifying them both; this promoted Norris to second and Sainz to third, Logan Sargeant was promoted to his first career point in tenth.

Charles Leclerc took his fourth pole position at the Mexico City Grand Prix, ahead of teammate Sainz, Verstappen, Daniel Ricciardo and Pérez. Verstappen took the lead at the start. Pérez collided with Leclerc giving the pair of them damage. Pérez returned to the pitlane, where his damage was deemed to be terminal. Leclerc was able to continue with a damage front wing; he was investigated for driving in an unsafe condition but was not penalised. Following the collision, Leclerc was in second, ahead of Sainz, with Ricciardo being overtaken for fourth by Hamilton in the opening laps. On lap 33, Magnussen crashed heavily at turn 8, bringing out the red flags to allow the barriers to be replaced. At the restart, Hamilton was able to immediately attack Leclerc for second but wouldn't pull off a successful overtake until lap 40. From there the front three stayed in their order and were able to pull away from each other to finish in that order. The result saw Verstappen take a record breaking 16th win in a season.

The São Paulo Grand Prix saw the final sprint of the season. Norris took pole for the sprint race ahead of Verstappen and Pérez. At the start of the sprint, Verstappen was able to take the lead, with Russell jumping up to second, with Norris third, with Pérez falling to fifth by the end of the opening lap. Pérez would soon regain fourth, and Norris regained second by lap 4. By lap 10, Pérez would regain third. Verstappen and Norris would pull away from the rest of the field and Verstappen won, with Norris close behind and Pérez third. Verstappen qualified on pole for the Grand Prix, ahead of Leclerc and Stroll. Leclerc crashed on the formation lap due to a hydraulic failure, and did not start the race. At the start, Verstappen held onto the lead ahead Norris and Hamilton, whilst at the back, the Williams of Alex Albon collided with both Haas cars, crashing into the barriers at turn 1 along with Magnussen, resulting in a red flag. Verstappen and Norris held their position at the restart, whilst Alonso passed Hamilton for third place. Norris was able to briefly challenge Verstappen for the lead, before Verstappen pulled away. He led the rest of the race comfortably, taking his 17th win of the season ahead of Norris. Alonso and Pérez fought intensely in the closing stages, and Alonso took his first podium in six races to finish third. He beat Pérez by 0.053 seconds.

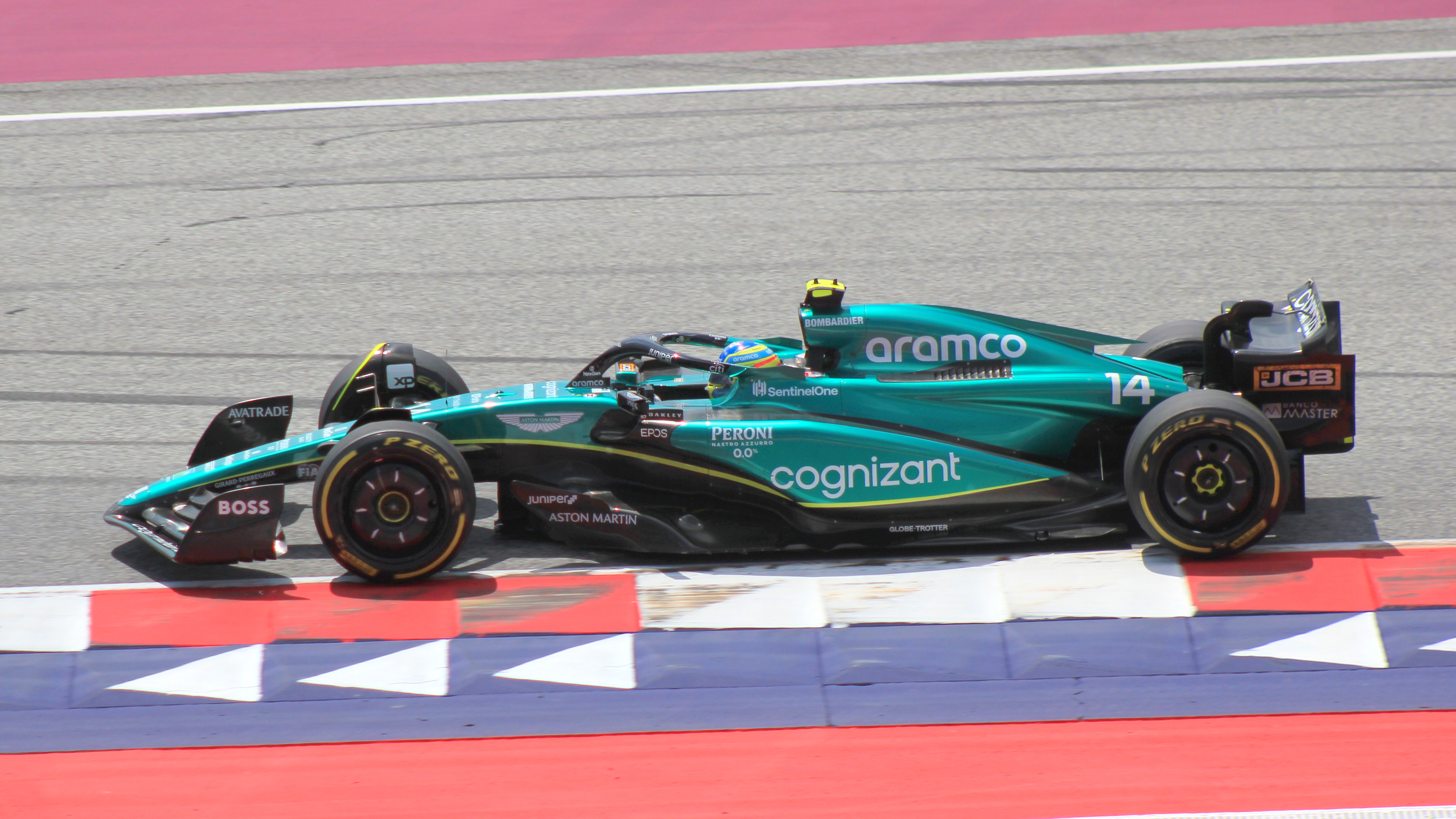
Fernando Alonso achieved his best season since 2013 by finishing 4th in the Drivers' Championship with 206 points and 8 podium finishes.

The first Las Vegas Grand Prix saw the Las Vegas Strip was repurposed into a temporary street circuit, the Las Vegas Strip Circuit. Early runs on track in first practice were curtailed when Carlos Sainz Jr.'s car struck a loose metal cover, severely damaging his car. He had to take a new engine component, resulting in a ten-place grid penalty for the race. Charles Leclerc took pole position ahead of teammate Sainz and Verstappen. At the start, Verstappen was able to take the lead by going up Leclerc's inside at the opening corner, this overtake earned Verstappen a penalty for forcing Leclerc off the track. On lap 4, Norris crashed heavily, he was taken to University Medical Center, but was later discharged. After the opening phase of pitstops, Pérez led from Stroll (both of whom had benefited from pitstops made during the safety cars earlier in the race) ahead of Leclerc, Sainz, Russell and Verstappen. Both Russell and Verstappen overtook Sainz. As Verstappen attempted to overtake Russell, the pair made contact, resulting in a penalty for Russell. From there, Verstappen was able to make his way into first, ahead of Leclerc and Pérez respectively, who had a multi-lap battle for the final two podium position, with Leclerc successfully taking second on the final lap.

The season came to a close with the Abu Dhabi Grand Prix a week later. All three qualification sessions were topped by Max Verstappen, who would take the pole position ahead of Charles Leclerc and Oscar Piastri. Verstappen led a majority of the Grand Prix, excluding in the pit stop phase where Leclerc and Yuki Tsunoda briefly led. Pérez finished second on track, but was demoted to fourth due to a penalty for a collision with Norris, promoting Leclerc to second and Russell to third.

=== Post-season analysis ===
Verstappen's and Red Bull's season's were described as "phenomenal" and "remarkable" as they broke records as the most dominant season performance in Formula One history: Verstappen won a record 19 Grands Prix in a season, also breaking the record for the highest Grand Prix win percentage for drivers, with a win rate percentage of 86.36%, beating the previous record set by Alberto Ascari in 1952, Verstappen's 21 podiums was also a record. Red Bull Racing, won 21 out of 22 Grands Prix, breaking the team record for highest percentage of Grand Prix wins in a season at 95.45%, beating McLaren's 1988 season. Despite Verstappen's dominance, teammate Pérez struggled to compete at the same level. Journalist Mike Seymour commented that Pérez had "plenty of lows" and Pérez himself described parts of his season as "tough" and thanked Red Bull for "keeping faith" in him. Team principal Christian Horner identified that Pérez needed to improve his qualifying performance, so that he could challenge at the front more regularly.

Mercedes' season was labeled as "disappointing" despite finishing second in the Constructors' Standings, and Hamilton finishing third behind only the Red Bull duo in a car that struggled with consistency. Russell described his season of being one of "missed opportunities" as he finished eighth. Although Russell achieved less than he had in 2022, he personally reflected that he felt he was a stronger driver, but that the team had more competition from Aston Martin and McLaren. Team principal Toto Wolff was critical of the car throughout the season describing it as a "miserable thing" and stating that its performance was "inexcusably poor". Ferrari's Leclerc also labelled their season as disappointing. Leclerc reflected that they started the season looking to challenge for the title, but the car was unable to compete with Red Bull. Leclerc further reflected that they were the second best car at times, but at others they were the fifth best car. Both Leclerc and team principal Frédéric Vasseur highlighted that there were positive take aways from the season and that they had the momentum to challenge Red Bull into 2024.

McLaren had started the season poorly, as one of the slowest cars in the field, before an upgrade at the Austrian Grand Prix propelled them up the field. McLaren's team principal Andrea Stella was lauded by McLaren CEO Zak Brown as a "tremendous leader" in his first season directing the team, and Piastri won the FIA Rookie of the Year for a season which was described as "phenomenal". Aston Martin started the season as Red Bull's closest challenger amid a substantial improvement from 2022, with Alonso regularly on the podium in the opening third of the season. However, mid year car developments did not work as planned and the team's relative performance dropped substantially across the remainder of the season. Alpine's season was another one which was described as being disappointing, The team's season was described as being compromised by a mid season managerial change; the team did have ambitions of finishing fourth but ended up a "distant" sixth.

Williams' season, in which they finished seventh in the constructors standings, was described as "promising" based on their improvement from 2022, when they finished tenth. Newly hired team principal James Vowles was praised for giving the team a sense of purpose which allowed their improvement. Albon was also praised for his performance across the season, and Sargeant criticised, with the latter only able to score one point to Albon's 27.

AlphaTauri's eighth-place finish was another which was described as disappointing, with journalist Gary Anderson going so far as to describe it as "wasted". AlphaTauri started the season as one of the worst cars on the grid, but was able to improve, although they were hampered by inconsistency. The team went through four drivers throughout the year, de Vries underperformed and was replaced. Ricciardo and Lawson were both able to secure better and more consistently results for the team, but it was Tsunoda who was praised for his driving throughout the year.

Alfa Romeo saw the biggest drop from 2022 to 2023, falling from sixth to ninth, in a season that was described as having few high points. The car was poor and described as lacking focus and direction, and while they found some additional performance late on, it was only able to keep them from falling to last. Haas finished the season in last place. There was optimism in the early stages of the campaign after they scored in three of the opening five rounds, but poor race pace, which did not improve with upgrades, meant they were unable to capitalise on the strong qualifying performances the car was able to produce.

During the 2023 season neither a British driver nor a British constructor won a championship race for the first time since the 1952 season.

== Results and standings ==
=== Grands Prix ===
Round	Grand Prix	Pole position	Fastest lap	Winning driver	Winning constructor	Report
1	Bahrain Grand Prix	(Netherlands) Max Verstappen	(China) Zhou Guanyu	(Netherlands) Max Verstappen	(Austria) Red Bull Racing-Honda RBPT	Report
2	(Saudi Arabia) Saudi Arabian Grand Prix	(Mexico) Sergio Pérez	(Netherlands) Max Verstappen	(Mexico) Sergio Pérez	(Austria) Red Bull Racing-Honda RBPT	Report
3	(Australia) Australian Grand Prix	(Netherlands) Max Verstappen	(Mexico) Sergio Pérez	(Netherlands) Max Verstappen	(Austria) Red Bull Racing-Honda RBPT	Report
4	Azerbaijan Grand Prix	(Monaco) Charles Leclerc	(United Kingdom) George Russell	(Mexico) Sergio Pérez	(Austria) Red Bull Racing-Honda RBPT	Report
5	(United States) Miami Grand Prix	(Mexico) Sergio Pérez	(Netherlands) Max Verstappen	(Netherlands) Max Verstappen	(Austria) Red Bull Racing-Honda RBPT	Report
6	Monaco Grand Prix	(Netherlands) Max Verstappen	(United Kingdom) Lewis Hamilton	(Netherlands) Max Verstappen	(Austria) Red Bull Racing-Honda RBPT	Report
7	(Spain) Spanish Grand Prix	(Netherlands) Max Verstappen	(Netherlands) Max Verstappen	(Netherlands) Max Verstappen	(Austria) Red Bull Racing-Honda RBPT	Report
8	(Canada) Canadian Grand Prix	(Netherlands) Max Verstappen	(Mexico) Sergio Pérez	(Netherlands) Max Verstappen	(Austria) Red Bull Racing-Honda RBPT	Report
9	(Austria) Austrian Grand Prix	(Netherlands) Max Verstappen	(Netherlands) Max Verstappen	(Netherlands) Max Verstappen	(Austria) Red Bull Racing-Honda RBPT	Report
10	(United Kingdom) British Grand Prix	(Netherlands) Max Verstappen	(Netherlands) Max Verstappen	(Netherlands) Max Verstappen	(Austria) Red Bull Racing-Honda RBPT	Report
11	(Hungary) Hungarian Grand Prix	(United Kingdom) Lewis Hamilton	(Netherlands) Max Verstappen	(Netherlands) Max Verstappen	(Austria) Red Bull Racing-Honda RBPT	Report
12	(Belgium) Belgian Grand Prix	(Monaco) Charles Leclerc (Note: Max Verstappen set the fastest time in qualifying, but received a five-place grid penalty for a new gearbox driveline. Charles Leclerc was promoted to pole position in his place.)	(United Kingdom) Lewis Hamilton	(Netherlands) Max Verstappen	(Austria) Red Bull Racing-Honda RBPT	Report
13	(Netherlands) Dutch Grand Prix	(Netherlands) Max Verstappen	(Spain) Fernando Alonso	(Netherlands) Max Verstappen	(Austria) Red Bull Racing-Honda RBPT	Report
14	(Italy) Italian Grand Prix	(Spain) Carlos Sainz Jr.	(Australia) Oscar Piastri	(Netherlands) Max Verstappen	(Austria) Red Bull Racing-Honda RBPT	Report
15	Singapore Grand Prix	(Spain) Carlos Sainz Jr.	(United Kingdom) Lewis Hamilton	(Spain) Carlos Sainz Jr.	(Italy) Ferrari	Report
16	(Japan) Japanese Grand Prix	(Netherlands) Max Verstappen	(Netherlands) Max Verstappen	(Netherlands) Max Verstappen	(Austria) Red Bull Racing-Honda RBPT	Report
17	Qatar Grand Prix	(Netherlands) Max Verstappen	(Netherlands) Max Verstappen	(Netherlands) Max Verstappen	(Austria) Red Bull Racing-Honda RBPT	Report
18	United States Grand Prix	(Monaco) Charles Leclerc	(Japan) Yuki Tsunoda	(Netherlands) Max Verstappen	(Austria) Red Bull Racing-Honda RBPT	Report
19	Mexico City Grand Prix	(Monaco) Charles Leclerc	(United Kingdom) Lewis Hamilton	(Netherlands) Max Verstappen	(Austria) Red Bull Racing-Honda RBPT	Report
20	(Brazil) São Paulo Grand Prix	(Netherlands) Max Verstappen	(United Kingdom) Lando Norris	(Netherlands) Max Verstappen	(Austria) Red Bull Racing-Honda RBPT	Report
21	(United States) Las Vegas Grand Prix	(Monaco) Charles Leclerc	(Australia) Oscar Piastri	(Netherlands) Max Verstappen	(Austria) Red Bull Racing-Honda RBPT	Report
22	(United Arab Emirates) Abu Dhabi Grand Prix	(Netherlands) Max Verstappen	(Netherlands) Max Verstappen	(Netherlands) Max Verstappen	(Austria) Red Bull Racing-Honda RBPT	Report

=== Scoring system ===
Points were awarded to the top ten classified drivers, the driver who set the fastest lap during the Grand Prix (only if one of the top ten), and the top eight of the sprint. In the case of a tie on points, a countback system was used where the driver with the most Grand Prix wins is ranked higher. If the number of wins is identical, then the number of second places is considered, and so on.

Points were awarded using the following system:

Position	1st	2nd	3rd	4th	5th	6th	7th	8th	9th	10th	FL
Race	25	18	15	12	10	8	6	4	2	1	1
Sprint	8	7	6	5	4	3	2	1			

=== World Drivers' Championship standings ===
Pos.	Driver	BHR (Bahrain)	SAU (Saudi Arabia)	AUS (Australia)	AZE (Azerbaijan)	MIA (United States)	MON (Monaco)	ESP (Spain)	CAN (Canada)	AUT (Austria)	GBR (United Kingdom)	HUN (Hungary)	BEL (Belgium)	NED (Netherlands)	ITA (Italy)	SIN (Singapore)	JPN (Japan)	QAT (Qatar)	USA (United States)	MXC (Mexico)	SAP (Brazil)	LVG (United States)	ABU (United Arab Emirates)	Points
1	(Netherlands) Max Verstappen	1^{P}	2^{F}	1^{P}	2^{3}	1^{F}	1^{P}	1^{P}^{F}	1^{P}	1^{P 1 F}	1^{P}^{F}	1^{F}	1^{1}	1^{P}	1	5	1^{P}^{F}	1^{P 2 F}	1^{1}	1	1^{P 1}	1	1^{P}^{F}	575
2	(Mexico) Sergio Pérez	2	1^{P}	5^{F}	1^{1}	2^{P}	16	4	6^{F}	3^{2}	6	3	2	4	2	8	Ret	10	4^{5}	Ret	4^{3}	3	4	285
3	(United Kingdom) Lewis Hamilton	5	5	2	6^{7}	6	4^{F}	2	3	8	3	4^{P}	4^{7 F}	6	6	3^{F}	5	Ret^{5}	DSQ^{2}	2^{F}	8^{7}	7	9	234
4	(Spain) Fernando Alonso	3	3	3	4^{6}	3	2	7	2	5^{5}	7	9	5	2^{F}	9	15	8	6^{8}	Ret	Ret	3	9	7	206
5	(Monaco) Charles Leclerc	Ret	7	Ret	3^{P 2}	7	6	11	4	2	9	7	3^{P 5}	Ret	4	4	4	5	DSQ^{P 3}	3^{P}	DNS^{5}	2^{P}	2	206
6	(United Kingdom) Lando Norris	17	17	6	9	17	9	17	13	4	2	2	7^{6}	7	8	2	2	3^{3}	2^{4}	5	2^{2 F}	Ret	5	205
7	(Spain) Carlos Sainz Jr.	4	6	12	5^{5}	5	8	5	5	6^{3}	10	8	Ret^{4}	5	3^{P}	1^{P}	6	DNS^{6}	3^{6}	4	6^{8}	6	18†	200
8	(United Kingdom) George Russell	7	4	Ret	8^{4 F}	4	5	3	Ret	7^{8}	5	6	6^{8}	17	5	16†	7	4^{4}	5^{8}	6	Ret^{4}	8	3	175
9	(Australia) Oscar Piastri	Ret	15	8	11	19	10	13	11	16	4	5	Ret^{2}	9	12^{F}	7	3	2^{1}	Ret	8	14	10^{F}	6	97
10	(Canada) Lance Stroll	6	Ret	4	7^{8}	12	Ret	6	9	9^{4}	14	10	9	11	16	WD	Ret	11	7	17†	5	5	10	74
11	(France) Pierre Gasly	9	9	13†	14	8	7	10	12	10	18†	Ret	11^{3}	3	15	6	10	12	6^{7}	11	7	11	13	62
12	(France) Esteban Ocon	Ret	8	14†	15	9	3	8	8	14^{7}	Ret	Ret	8	10	Ret	Ret	9	7	Ret	10	10	4	12	58
13	(Thailand) Alexander Albon	10	Ret	Ret	12	14	14	16	7	11	8	11	14	8	7	11	Ret	13^{7}	9	9	Ret	12	14	27
14	(Japan) Yuki Tsunoda	11	11	10	10	11	15	12	14	19	16	15	10	15	DNS	Ret	12	15	8^{F}	12	9^{6}	18†	8	17
15	(Finland) Valtteri Bottas	8	18	11	18	13	11	19	10	15	12	12	12	14	10	Ret	Ret	8	12	15	Ret	17	19	10
16	(Germany) Nico Hülkenberg	15	12	7	17	15	17	15	15	Ret^{6}	13	14	18	12	17	13	14	16	11	13	12	19†	15	9
17	(Australia) Daniel Ricciardo											13	16	WD					15	7	13	14	11	6
18	(China) Zhou Guanyu	16^{F}	13	9	Ret	16	13	9	16	12	15	16	13	Ret	14	12	13	9	13	14	Ret	15	17	6
19	(Denmark) Kevin Magnussen	13	10	17†	13	10	19†	18	17	18	Ret	17	15	16	18	10	15	14	14	Ret	Ret	13	20	3
20	(New Zealand) Liam Lawson													13	11	9	11	17						2
21	(United States) Logan Sargeant	12	16	16†	16	20	18	20	Ret	13	11	18†	17	Ret	13	14	Ret	Ret	10	16†	11	16	16	1
22	(Netherlands) Nyck de Vries	14	14	15†	Ret	18	12	14	18	17	17													0
Pos.	Driver	BHR (Bahrain)	SAU (Saudi Arabia)	AUS (Australia)	AZE (Azerbaijan)	MIA (United States)	MON (Monaco)	ESP (Spain)	CAN (Canada)	AUT (Austria)	GBR (United Kingdom)	HUN (Hungary)	BEL (Belgium)	NED (Netherlands)	ITA (Italy)	SIN (Singapore)	JPN (Japan)	QAT (Qatar)	USA (United States)	MXC (Mexico)	SAP (Brazil)	LVG (United States)	ABU (United Arab Emirates)	Points

Key
Colour	Result
Gold	Winner
Silver	Second place
Bronze	Third place
Green	Other points position
Blue	Other classified position
Blue	Not classified, finished (NC)
Purple	Not classified, retired (Ret)
Red	Did not qualify (DNQ)
Black	Disqualified (DSQ)
White	Did not start (DNS)
White	Race cancelled (C)
Blank	Did not practice (DNP)
Blank	Excluded (EX)
Blank	Did not arrive (DNA)
Blank	Withdrawn (WD)
Blank	Did not enter (empty cell)
Annotation	Meaning
P	Pole position
F	Fastest lap
Superscript number	Points-scoring position in sprint

Notes:

- † – Driver did not finish the Grand Prix, but was classified as he completed more than 90% of the race distance.

=== World Constructors' Championship standings ===
Pos.	Constructor	BHR (Bahrain)	SAU (Saudi Arabia)	AUS (Australia)	AZE (Azerbaijan)	MIA (United States)	MON (Monaco)	ESP (Spain)	CAN (Canada)	AUT (Austria)	GBR (United Kingdom)	HUN (Hungary)	BEL (Belgium)	NED (Netherlands)	ITA (Italy)	SIN (Singapore)	JPN (Japan)	QAT (Qatar)	USA (United States)	MXC (Mexico)	SAP (Brazil)	LVG (United States)	ABU (United Arab Emirates)	Points
1	(Austria) Red Bull Racing-Honda RBPT	1^{P}	1^{P}	1^{P}	1^{1}	1^{F}	1^{P}	1^{P}^{F}	1^{P}	1^{P 1 F}	1^{P}^{F}	1^{F}	1^{1}	1^{P}	1	5	1^{P}^{F}	1^{P 2 F}	1^{1}	1	1^{P 1}	1	1^{P}^{F}	860
1	(Austria) Red Bull Racing-Honda RBPT	2	2^{F}	5^{F}	2^{3}	2^{P}	16	4	6^{F}	3^{2}	6	3	2	4	2	8	Ret	10	4^{5}	Ret	4^{3}	3	4	860
2	(Germany) Mercedes	5	4	2	6^{7}	4	4^{F}	2	3	7^{8}	3	4^{P}	4^{7 F}	6	5	3^{F}	5	4^{4}	5^{8}	2^{F}	8^{7}	7	3	409
2	(Germany) Mercedes	7	5	Ret	8^{4 F}	6	5	3	Ret	8	5	6	6^{8}	17	6	16†	7	Ret^{5}	DSQ^{2}	6	Ret^{4}	8	9	409
3	(Italy) Ferrari	4	6	12	3^{P 2}	5	6	5	4	2	9	7	3^{P 5}	5	3^{P}	1^{P}	4	5	3^{6}	3^{P}	6^{8}	2^{P}	2	406
3	(Italy) Ferrari	Ret	7	Ret	5^{5}	7	8	11	5	6^{3}	10	8	Ret^{4}	Ret	4	4	6	DNS^{6}	DSQ^{P 3}	4	DNS^{5}	6	18†	406
4	(United Kingdom) McLaren-Mercedes	17	15	6	9	17	9	13	11	4	2	2	7^{6}	7	8	2	2	2^{1}	2^{4}	5	2^{2 F}	10^{F}	5	302
4	(United Kingdom) McLaren-Mercedes	Ret	17	8	11	19	10	17	13	16	4	5	Ret^{2}	9	12^{F}	7	3	3^{3}	Ret	8	14	Ret	6	302
5	(United Kingdom) Aston Martin Aramco-Mercedes	3	3	3	4^{6}	3	2	6	2	5^{5}	7	9	5	2^{F}	9	15	8	6^{8}	7	17†	3	5	7	280
5	(United Kingdom) Aston Martin Aramco-Mercedes	6	Ret	4	7^{8}	12	Ret	7	9	9^{4}	14	10	9	11	16	WD	Ret	11	Ret	Ret	5	9	10	280
6	(France) Alpine-Renault	9	8	13†	14	8	3	8	8	10	18†	Ret	8	3	15	6	9	7	6^{7}	10	7	4	12	120
6	(France) Alpine-Renault	Ret	9	14†	15	9	7	10	12	14^{7}	Ret	Ret	11^{3}	10	Ret	Ret	10	12	Ret	11	10	11	13	120
7	(United Kingdom) Williams-Mercedes	10	16	16†	12	14	14	16	7	11	8	11	14	8	7	11	Ret	13^{7}	9	9	11	12	14	28
7	(United Kingdom) Williams-Mercedes	12	Ret	Ret	16	20	18	20	Ret	13	11	18†	17	Ret	13	14	Ret	Ret	10	16†	Ret	16	16	28
8	(Italy) AlphaTauri-Honda RBPT	11	11	10	10	11	12	12	14	17	16	13	10	13	11	9	11	15	8^{F}	7	9^{6}	14	8	25
8	(Italy) AlphaTauri-Honda RBPT	14	14	15†	Ret	18	15	14	18	19	17	15	16	15	DNS	Ret	12	17	15	12	13	18†	11	25
9	(Switzerland) Alfa Romeo-Ferrari	8	13	9	18	13	11	9	10	12	12	12	12	14	10	12	13	8	12	14	Ret	15	17	16
9	(Switzerland) Alfa Romeo-Ferrari	16^{F}	18	11	Ret	16	13	19	16	15	15	16	13	Ret	14	Ret	Ret	9	13	15	Ret	17	19	16
10	(United States) Haas-Ferrari	13	10	7	13	10	17	15	15	18	13	14	15	12	17	10	14	14	11	13	12	13	15	12
10	(United States) Haas-Ferrari	15	12	17†	17	15	19†	18	17	Ret^{6}	Ret	17	18	16	18	13	15	16	14	Ret	Ret	19†	20	12
Pos.	Constructor	BHR (Bahrain)	SAU (Saudi Arabia)	AUS (Australia)	AZE (Azerbaijan)	MIA (United States)	MON (Monaco)	ESP (Spain)	CAN (Canada)	AUT (Austria)	GBR (United Kingdom)	HUN (Hungary)	BEL (Belgium)	NED (Netherlands)	ITA (Italy)	SIN (Singapore)	JPN (Japan)	QAT (Qatar)	USA (United States)	MXC (Mexico)	SAP (Brazil)	LVG (United States)	ABU (United Arab Emirates)	Points

Key
Colour	Result
Gold	Winner
Silver	Second place
Bronze	Third place
Green	Other points position
Blue	Other classified position
Blue	Not classified, finished (NC)
Purple	Not classified, retired (Ret)
Red	Did not qualify (DNQ)
Black	Disqualified (DSQ)
White	Did not start (DNS)
White	Race cancelled (C)
Blank	Did not practice (DNP)
Blank	Excluded (EX)
Blank	Did not arrive (DNA)
Blank	Withdrawn (WD)
Blank	Did not enter (empty cell)
Annotation	Meaning
P	Pole position
F	Fastest lap
Superscript number	Points-scoring position in sprint

Notes:

- † – Driver did not finish the Grand Prix, but was classified as he completed more than 90% of the race distance.
- Rows are not related to the drivers: within each constructor, individual Grand Prix standings are sorted purely based on the final classification in the race (not by total points scored in the event, which includes points awarded for fastest lap and sprint).

== See also ==
- 2023 Formula One pre-season testing
- 2023 Formula One post-season testing
