= 2023 Monaco Grand Prix =

Formula One motor race

Race 6 of 22 in the 2023 Formula One World Championship
← Previous race	Next race →
- Layout of the Circuit de Monte Carlo, Monaco

Race details
- Date: 28 May 2023
- Official name: Formula 1 Grand Prix de Monaco 2023
- Location: Circuit de Monaco; La Condamine and Monte Carlo, Monaco
- Course: Street circuit
- Course length: 3.337 km (2.074 miles)
- Distance: 78 laps, 260.286 km (161.772 miles)
- Weather: Cloudy, with some rain intervals

Pole position
Driver	(Netherlands) Max Verstappen	Red Bull Racing-Honda RBPT
- Time: 1:11.365

Fastest lap
Driver	(United Kingdom) Lewis Hamilton	Mercedes
- Time: 1:15.650 on lap 33

Podium
First	(Netherlands) Max Verstappen	Red Bull Racing-Honda RBPT
Second	(Spain) Fernando Alonso	Aston Martin-Mercedes
Third	(France) Esteban Ocon	Alpine-Renault

The 2023 Monaco Grand Prix (officially known as the Formula 1 Grand Prix de Monaco 2023) was a Formula One motor race that was held on 28 May 2023, at the Circuit de Monaco in the Principality of Monaco. It was the sixth round of the 2023 Formula One World Championship.

The race, which was affected by rain during the middle stages, was won by polesitter Max Verstappen, ahead of Fernando Alonso and Esteban Ocon, the latter receiving his third podium in his Formula One career after the 2021 Hungarian Grand Prix.

== Background ==
The event was held across the weekend of 26–28 May 2023. It was the sixth round of the 2023 Formula One World Championship, after the previously scheduled Emilia Romagna Grand Prix was cancelled due to floods in the region.

Due to this, Mercedes, a team with pending upgrades intended to be introduced during the Imola race, had to implement them during the Monaco race. The team's car, which utilised the "zero-pod" design that was introduced in the previous year's car, brought an upgrade that reintroduced the sidepods into Monaco. In addition, the Alfa Romeo, Aston Martin and Alpine teams sported upgrade packages for the weekend.

=== Championship standings before the race ===
Going into the weekend, Max Verstappen led the World Drivers' Championship with 119 points, 14 points ahead of his teammate Sergio Pérez in second, and 44 ahead of Fernando Alonso in third. Red Bull Racing, with 224 points, led the Constructors' Championship from Aston Martin and Mercedes, who were second and third with 102 and 96 points, respectively.

=== Entrants ===
The drivers and teams were the same as the season entry list with no additional stand-in drivers for the race.

=== Tyre choices ===
Tyre supplier Pirelli brought the C3, C4, and C5 tyre compounds (designated hard, medium, and soft, respectively) for teams to use at the event.

== Practice ==
Three free practice sessions were held for the event. The first free practice session was held on 26 May 2023, at 13:30 local time (UTC+2). Carlos Sainz Jr. topped the session ahead of Fernando Alonso and Lewis Hamilton. The second free practice session was held on 26 May 2023, at 17:00 local time (UTC+2). Max Verstappen topped the session ahead of Charles Leclerc and Sainz. The third free practice session was held on 27 May 2023, at 12:30 local time (UTC+2). Verstappen again topped the session ahead of Sergio Pérez and Lance Stroll.

== Qualifying ==
Qualifying was held on 27 May 2023, at 16:00 local time (UTC+2).

=== Qualifying report ===
Max Verstappen set the quickest time across all three sessions. During the first session, Carlos Sainz Jr.'s time on his first lap was deleted due to exceeding track limits. Sergio Pérez crashed out of the opening Sainte Dévote corner, red-flagging the session and damaging his car. Due to this, he started in the last position. Due to the narrow nature of the track, his car had to be craned out; the second time such had happened during the weekend following Lewis Hamilton during the third free practice session, which was red-flagged. Pérez's teammate Verstappen tapped the wall following the restart, but no damage was reported. By the end of the first session, Logan Sargeant, the Haas duo of Kevin Magnussen and Nico Hülkenberg, Zhou Guanyu, and Pérez found themselves knocked out.

During the second session, Lando Norris found himself hitting the wall at the Tabac chicane, inflicting minor damage to his car. However, he found himself progressing through the third session; his teammate Oscar Piastri would not. Joining him were Nyck de Vries, Alexander Albon, Lance Stroll and Valtteri Bottas.

During the third and final session, Norris would go out later after quick repairs to his car, though he could not beat Yuki Tsunoda (who would qualify ninth) to the line. The session proved to be the tightest of the weekend as Verstappen set the fastest lap during the closing minutes of the session. Just before the session ended and before Verstappen set his pole time, Fernando Alonso (in second), Esteban Ocon (in fourth), and Charles Leclerc (in third with a brief investigation for impeding Norris) all set the fastest lap. Leclerc was dissatisfied with the result, saying he "struggled a lot with the car", while Verstappen said that "in qualifying, you need to go all out and risk it all". Meanwhile, Lewis Hamilton, Pierre Gasly and George Russell made up sixth, seventh and eighth position respectively. This was Verstappen's first Monaco Grand Prix pole position. With penalties applied, this was the third time Ocon achieved a starting position of third following the 2017 Italian Grand Prix and 2018 Belgian Grand Prix.

Leclerc was dropped to sixth after the stewards investigated his impeding of Norris earlier in Q3.

=== Qualifying classification ===
Pos.	No.	Driver	Constructor	Qualifying times			Final grid
Pos.	No.	Driver	Constructor	Q1	Q2	Q3	Final grid
1	1	(Netherlands) Max Verstappen	Red Bull Racing-Honda RBPT	1:12.386	1:11.908	1:11.365	1
2	14	(Spain) Fernando Alonso	Aston Martin Aramco-Mercedes	1:12.886	1:12.107	1:11.449	2
3	16	(Monaco) Charles Leclerc	Ferrari	1:12.912	1:12.103	1:11.471	6^{a}
4	31	(France) Esteban Ocon	Alpine-Renault	1:12.967	1:12.248	1:11.553	3
5	55	(Spain) Carlos Sainz Jr.	Ferrari	1:12.717	1:12.210	1:11.630	4
6	44	(United Kingdom) Lewis Hamilton	Mercedes	1:12.872	1:12.156	1:11.725	5
7	10	(France) Pierre Gasly	Alpine-Renault	1:13.033	1:12.169	1:11.933	7
8	63	(United Kingdom) George Russell	Mercedes	1:12.769	1:12.151	1:11.964	8
9	22	(Japan) Yuki Tsunoda	AlphaTauri-Honda RBPT	1:12.642	1:12.249	1:12.082	9
10	4	(United Kingdom) Lando Norris	McLaren-Mercedes	1:12.877	1:12.377	1:12.254	10
11	81	(Australia) Oscar Piastri	McLaren-Mercedes	1:13.006	1:12.395	N/A	11
12	21	(Netherlands) Nyck de Vries	AlphaTauri-Honda RBPT	1:13.054	1:12.428	N/A	12
13	23	(Thailand) Alexander Albon	Williams-Mercedes	1:12.706	1:12.527	N/A	13
14	18	(Canada) Lance Stroll	Aston Martin Aramco-Mercedes	1:12.722	1:12.623	N/A	14
15	77	(Finland) Valtteri Bottas	Alfa Romeo-Ferrari	1:13.038	1:12.625	N/A	15
16	2	(United States) Logan Sargeant	Williams-Mercedes	1:13.113	N/A	N/A	16
17	20	(Denmark) Kevin Magnussen	Haas-Ferrari	1:13.270	N/A	N/A	17
18	27	(Germany) Nico Hülkenberg	Haas-Ferrari	1:13.279	N/A	N/A	18
19	24	(China) Zhou Guanyu	Alfa Romeo-Ferrari	1:13.523	N/A	N/A	19
20	11	(Mexico) Sergio Pérez	Red Bull Racing-Honda RBPT	1:13.850	N/A	N/A	20
107% time: 1:17.453

Notes

- ^a – Charles Leclerc received a three-place grid penalty for impeding Lando Norris in Q3.

== Race ==
The race was held on 28 May 2023, at 15:00 local time (UTC+2).

=== Race report ===
Following the formation lap, George Russell made a mistake with his start but was not penalised. As the race began, Nico Hülkenberg made contact with Logan Sargeant, which granted the Haas driver a five-second penalty. Sergio Pérez made an early stop to swap to the hard tyres. By lap 14, Carlos Sainz Jr. ran off the Nouvelle chicane, his front wing making contact with Esteban Ocon's right-rear. Sainz decided to continue on. Valtteri Bottas jumped Alexander Albon, with the latter granting himself a new set of hard tyres. His teammate Sargeant would follow, first on hards, and again on softs. By lap 30, Lewis Hamilton put on fresh hards and came out behind Russell.

By lap 20, Ferrari engineers told Sainz to come in to overtake Ocon, though he was then told to stay out. The order was repeated six laps later, with Ferrari once again telling him to stay out afterwards. Sainz eventually boxed by lap 33 with new mediums, rejoining in seventh and behind Ocon. Sainz was frustrated with the strategy, criticising it over team radio. Soon, Pérez came in with new mediums and a new front wing, coming out in last. Lance Stroll reported damage during lap 38, having made contact with Kevin Magnussen. Charles Leclerc went in for fresh mediums, dropping him to eighth; Pierre Gasly failed to overcut Leclerc with new fresh mediums. Lando Norris came in for hards, dropping him a position lower.

A threat of rain was reported during the race; Russell reported drops by turn 3. The first two drivers to switch to intermediates were Stroll and Bottas; soon Zhou Guanyu and Albon followed. While everyone else went for intermediate tyres, Fernando Alonso decided to use medium tyres; he switched to inters the following lap, with Ferrari deciding to double stack. Sainz spun twice, though did not hit the barriers at high speeds. Stroll, however, received damage to his car following his front wing lodging itself underneath his front wheels. Max Verstappen grazed the wall at Portier while on mediums, but saved the car from retirement. Magnussen took full wets, having had hards as the rain began; Pérez would utilise the compound later on. However, Magnussen crashed out with damage to his front wing. His mechanics, unprepared for such a change, had to prepare it on the spot, lengthening his time in the pits. Meanwhile, Sargeant hit the wall at the hairpin, though he recovered the car. Magnussen would go off on turn one, and Stroll went into an escape road at turn five; Russell followed Stroll into the escape road, only to be hit by Pérez. Meanwhile, Hülkenberg was given a 10 second penalty for serving the first one incorrectly, Gasly was shown a black and white flag for exceeding track limits, Pérez swapped to inters, and Yuki Tsunoda reported problems with his brakes.

The running order on the top three did not change throughout the race. Verstappen's victory marks his second Monaco Grand Prix victory. Alonso finished second; his former teammate Ocon finished third and was awarded driver of the day; the first time a French driver was on the podium in Monaco since Olivier Panis in 1996, and his first podium since the 2021 Hungarian Grand Prix, which was also his first win. Hamilton took the fastest lap. A five-second penalty was given to Russell after an unsafe rejoin, though his final position was not affected.

=== Race classification ===
Pos.	No.	Driver	Constructor	Laps	Time/Retired	Grid	Points
1	1	(Netherlands) Max Verstappen	Red Bull Racing-Honda RBPT	78	1:48:51.980	1	25
2	14	(Spain) Fernando Alonso	Aston Martin Aramco-Mercedes	78	+27.921	2	18
3	31	(France) Esteban Ocon	Alpine-Renault	78	+36.990	3	15
4	44	(United Kingdom) Lewis Hamilton	Mercedes	78	+39.062	5	13^{a}
5	63	(United Kingdom) George Russell	Mercedes	78	+56.284^{b}	8	10
6	16	(Monaco) Charles Leclerc	Ferrari	78	+1:01.890	6	8
7	10	(France) Pierre Gasly	Alpine-Renault	78	+1:02.362	7	6
8	55	(Spain) Carlos Sainz Jr.	Ferrari	78	+1:03.391	4	4
9	4	(United Kingdom) Lando Norris	McLaren-Mercedes	77	+1 lap	10	2
10	81	(Australia) Oscar Piastri	McLaren-Mercedes	77	+1 lap	11	1
11	77	(Finland) Valtteri Bottas	Alfa Romeo-Ferrari	77	+1 lap	15	
12	21	(Netherlands) Nyck de Vries	AlphaTauri-Honda RBPT	77	+1 lap	12	
13	24	(China) Zhou Guanyu	Alfa Romeo-Ferrari	77	+1 lap	19	
14	23	(Thailand) Alexander Albon	Williams-Mercedes	77	+1 lap	13	
15	22	(Japan) Yuki Tsunoda	AlphaTauri-Honda RBPT	76	+2 laps	9	
16	11	(Mexico) Sergio Pérez	Red Bull Racing-Honda RBPT	76	+2 laps	20	
17	27	(Germany) Nico Hülkenberg	Haas-Ferrari	76	+2 laps^{c}	18	
18	2	(United States) Logan Sargeant	Williams-Mercedes	76	+2 laps^{d}	16	
19^{e}	20	(Denmark) Kevin Magnussen	Haas-Ferrari	70	Damage	17	
Ret	18	(Canada) Lance Stroll	Aston Martin Aramco-Mercedes	53	Incident damage	14	
Fastest lap: (United Kingdom) Lewis Hamilton (Mercedes) – 1:15.650 (lap 33)

Notes

- ^a – Includes one point for fastest lap.
- ^b – George Russell received a five-second time penalty for rejoining the track unsafely. His final position was not affected by the penalty.
- ^c – Nico Hülkenberg finished 16th, but he received a ten-second time penalty for failing to serve a penalty during a pit stop.
- ^d – Logan Sargeant received a five-second time penalty for speeding in the pit lane. His final position was not affected by the penalty.
- ^e – Kevin Magnussen was classified as he completed more than 90% of the race distance.

== Championship standings after the race ==
Drivers' Championship standings

	Pos.	Driver	Points
	1	(Netherlands) Max Verstappen	144
	2	(Mexico) Sergio Pérez	105
	3	(Spain) Fernando Alonso	93
	4	(United Kingdom) Lewis Hamilton	69
1	5	(United Kingdom) George Russell	50

Constructors' Championship standings

	Pos.	Constructor	Points
	1	(Austria) Red Bull Racing-Honda RBPT	249
	2	(United Kingdom) Aston Martin Aramco-Mercedes	120
	3	(Germany) Mercedes	119
	4	(Italy) Ferrari	90
1	5	(France) Alpine-Renault	35

- Note: Only the top five positions are included for both sets of standings.

== See also ==
- 2023 Monte Carlo Formula 2 round
- 2023 Monte Carlo Formula 3 round

Previous race: 2023 Miami Grand Prix (2023 Emilia Romagna Grand Prix cancelled)	FIA Formula One World Championship; 2023 season	Next race: 2023 Spanish Grand Prix
Previous race: 2022 Monaco Grand Prix	Monaco Grand Prix	Next race: 2024 Monaco Grand Prix
