= 2023 Canadian Grand Prix =

Formula One motor race

Race 8 of 22 in the 2023 Formula One World Championship
← Previous race	Next race →

Race details
- Date: 18 June 2023
- Official name: Formula 1 Pirelli Grand Prix du Canada 2023
- Location: Circuit Gilles Villeneuve, Montréal, Quebec, Canada
- Course: Street circuit
- Course length: 4.361 km (2.710 miles)
- Distance: 70 laps, 305.270 km (189.686 miles)
- Weather: Partly cloudy
- Attendance: 345,000

Pole position
Driver	(Netherlands) Max Verstappen	Red Bull Racing-Honda RBPT
- Time: 1:25.858

Fastest lap
Driver	(Mexico) Sergio Pérez	Red Bull Racing-Honda RBPT
- Time: 1:14.481 on lap 70

Podium
First	(Netherlands) Max Verstappen	Red Bull Racing-Honda RBPT
Second	(Spain) Fernando Alonso	Aston Martin Aramco-Mercedes
Third	(United Kingdom) Lewis Hamilton	Mercedes

The 2023 Canadian Grand Prix (officially known as the Formula 1 Pirelli Grand Prix du Canada 2023) was a Formula One motor race, which was held on 18 June 2023 at the Circuit Gilles Villeneuve in Montreal, Quebec, Canada. It was the eighth round of the 2023 Formula One World Championship.

The race was won by Max Verstappen, who started from pole position and led the entirety of the race, followed by Aston Martin's Fernando Alonso and Mercedes' Lewis Hamilton. Verstappen's victory marked Red Bull Racing's 100th victory in Formula One.

345,000 people attended over the three days, a record for the Grand Prix.

== Background ==
The event was held across the weekend of 16–18 June 2023. It was the eighth round of the 2023 Formula One World Championship. After the fires in the region, the Grand Prix was in danger of being cancelled. However, on 9 June, Formula One Management made a statement that the Grand Prix would continue as planned.

The Aston Martin team brought major upgrades to the race, overhauling its sidepods and floor.

=== Championship standings before the race ===
Max Verstappen was the Drivers' Championship leader after the seventh round, the Spanish Grand Prix, with 170 points, 53 ahead of Sergio Pérez in second, with Fernando Alonso in third, 18 points behind Pérez. In the Constructors' Championship, Red Bull Racing led Mercedes by 135 points and Aston Martin by 153.

=== Entrants ===
The drivers and teams were the same as the season entry list with no additional stand-in drivers for the race.

=== Tyre choices ===
Tyre supplier Pirelli brought the C3, C4 and C5 tyre compounds (designated hard, medium, and soft, respectively) for teams to use at the event.

== Practice ==
The weekend had three free practice sessions, two on 16 June 2023 and one on 17 June 2023. The first practice session started at 13:30 local time (UTC−4), but was abandoned after a few minutes of running after a CCTV failure at the venue. The session was initially stopped to recover the Alpine car of Pierre Gasly, which had stopped on track. Ultimately only twelve drivers set a time in the much curtailed first session with Valtteri Bottas of Alfa Romeo fastest ahead of Lance Stroll and Fernando Alonso in the two Aston Martin cars. The FIA also announced the intention to commence the second practice session at 16:30 local time (UTC−4) rather than the originally planned time of 17:00 (UTC−4), also extending the length of the session from the planned 60 minutes to 90 minutes in order to give teams a chance to make up for some of the lost running in the first session.

The second practice, which ran for 90 minutes, ended with Lewis Hamilton leading the session ahead of teammate George Russell and Carlos Sainz Jr. The session was red-flagged twice due to issues with Esteban Ocon and Nico Hülkenberg's vehicles. The third practice session started on 17 June 2023 at 12:30 local time (UTC−4). The session was red-flagged after a crash by Carlos Sainz Jr. Verstappen was fastest ahead of Leclerc and Alonso.

== Qualifying ==
Qualifying was held on 17 June 2023, at 16:00 local time (UTC−4).

=== Qualifying report ===
Rain befell the second and third session. Only three minutes after Q1 began, Zhou Guanyu reported an issue with his Ferrari power unit and caused a red flag with a stranded and powerless car on track. However, during the red flag period, his car was able to restart and he went back into the pits. However, he did not set a further time, so he started at the back of the grid. Max Verstappen topped Q1 ahead of Fernando Alonso and Lewis Hamilton, with Carlos Sainz Jr. impeding Lando Norris and Pierre Gasly, the latter who was shown to be furious over the team radio. His impeding resulted in a three-place drop for the Ferrari driver. Gasly joined Zhou, Yuki Tsunoda, teammate Nyck de Vries and Logan Sargeant as the drivers all out of Q1.

It was during Q2 that the rain started to fall. As such, drivers used intermediate tyres; Sergio Pérez and Lance Stroll made contact with the wall no damage, and joined Charles Leclerc, Kevin Magnussen and Valtteri Bottas as the drivers out of Q2. Alexander Albon set the fastest lap of the session, but could not set a time in Q3. Hamilton set a time for 10th.

Verstappen began Q3 with a slide off the final corner, with Oscar Piastri going fully off the exit of turn 6 and crashing out. This resulted in the second red flag of the day as Nico Hülkenberg set a time as it went out. The session was soon resumed. Before penalties, Hülkenberg's time for second place gave Haas its second-highest qualification result after Magnussen's pole at the 2022 São Paulo Grand Prix. He was behind polesitter Verstappen and ahead of Alonso. Hülkenberg was surprised with his performance, saying that it "comes a bit unexpected," but expected a challenge during the race.

Hülkenberg was summoned to the stewards for a red flag infraction, dropping him three places; Tsunoda and Stroll were also given three-place drops for impeding.

=== Qualifying classification ===
Pos.	No.	Driver	Constructor	Qualifying times			Final grid
Pos.	No.	Driver	Constructor	Q1	Q2	Q3	Final grid
1	1	(Netherlands) Max Verstappen	Red Bull Racing-Honda RBPT	1:20.851	1:19.092	1:25.858	1
2	27	(Germany) Nico Hülkenberg	Haas-Ferrari	1:22.730	1:20.305	1:27.102	5^{a}
3	14	(Spain) Fernando Alonso	Aston Martin Aramco-Mercedes	1:21.481	1:19.776	1:27.286	2
4	44	(United Kingdom) Lewis Hamilton	Mercedes	1:21.554	1:20.426	1:27.627	3
5	63	(United Kingdom) George Russell	Mercedes	1:21.798	1:20.098	1:27.893	4
6	31	(France) Esteban Ocon	Alpine-Renault	1:22.114	1:20.406	1:27.945	6
7	4	(United Kingdom) Lando Norris	McLaren-Mercedes	1:21.998	1:19.347	1:28.046	7
8	55	(Spain) Carlos Sainz Jr.	Ferrari	1:22.248	1:19.856	1:29.294	11^{b}
9	81	(Australia) Oscar Piastri	McLaren-Mercedes	1:22.190	1:19.659	1:31.349	8
10	23	(Thailand) Alexander Albon	Williams-Mercedes	1:21.938	1:18.725	No time	9
11	16	(Monaco) Charles Leclerc	Ferrari	1:21.843	1:20.615	N/A	10
12	11	(Mexico) Sergio Pérez	Red Bull Racing-Honda RBPT	1:22.151	1:20.959	N/A	12
13	18	(Canada) Lance Stroll	Aston Martin Aramco-Mercedes	1:22.677	1:21.484	N/A	16^{c}
14	20	(Denmark) Kevin Magnussen	Haas-Ferrari	1:22.351	1:21.678	N/A	13
15	77	(Finland) Valtteri Bottas	Alfa Romeo-Ferrari	1:22.332	1:21.821	N/A	14
16	22	(Japan) Yuki Tsunoda	AlphaTauri-Honda RBPT	1:22.746	N/A	N/A	19^{d}
17	10	(France) Pierre Gasly	Alpine-Renault	1:22.886	N/A	N/A	15
18	21	(Netherlands) Nyck de Vries	AlphaTauri-Honda RBPT	1:23.137	N/A	N/A	17
19	2	(United States) Logan Sargeant	Williams-Mercedes	1:23.337	N/A	N/A	18
20	24	(China) Zhou Guanyu	Alfa Romeo-Ferrari	1:23.342	N/A	N/A	20
107% time: 1:26.510^{e}

Notes

- ^a – Nico Hülkenberg received a three-place grid penalty for a red flag infringement in Q3.
- ^b – Carlos Sainz Jr. received a three-place grid penalty for impeding Pierre Gasly in Q1.
- ^c – Lance Stroll received a three-place grid penalty for impeding Esteban Ocon in Q2.
- ^d – Yuki Tsunoda received a three-place grid penalty for impeding Nico Hülkenberg in Q1.
- ^e – As qualifying was held on a wet track, the 107% rule was not in force.

== Race ==
The race was held on 18 June 2023, at 14:00 local time (UTC−4).

=== Race report ===
As the race began, polesitter Max Verstappen was challenged by Lewis Hamilton as the cars went into the first corner. Soon, Verstappen would create a lead which he would keep throughout the 70 laps ran during the race. Meanwhile, Esteban Ocon overtook Nico Hülkenberg, who would drop down to fifteenth from his starting position of fifth, while Hülkenberg's teammate Kevin Magnussen brushed the wall and continued on. Logan Sargeant retired from the race, his first retirement of the season. This resulted in a brief virtual safety car period, allowing the recovery of the stranded Williams car. Soon, George Russell hit the wall on turn nine, necessitating a full safety car period. All drivers, including Russell, who received a new front wing and repairs to his car, went into the pit lane for their stops. The only drivers who did not stop were the Ferrari duo of Charles Leclerc and Sainz. During this period, a close call between Lewis Hamilton and Fernando Alonso was reported, and Lando Norris for an unsafe release. All three drivers were investigated with no further action taken, though Norris was given a five-second penalty for unsportsmanlike behaviour; he had slowed down during the safety car period.

As the safety car period ended, Verstappen sped ahead of Hamilton, with Alonso unable to fight the two. Alonso would regain second place. A brief yellow flag was observed for a collision between Magnussen and Nyck de Vries. Alexander Albon, on seventh position and having set the hards on his earlier stop, began to hold up Russell, Ocon, Valtteri Bottas and Norris behind him as Russell retired from eighth place and Norris went for Bottas on the final corner, sending him up to ninth; the penalty Norris had received earlier would drop him outside the points into thirteenth. Albon's defending awarded him with the driver of the day.

Verstappen won the race, giving Red Bull its 100th Formula One victory, which also marked Adrian Newey's 200th win in Formula One; his teammate Sergio Pérez on sixth position set the fastest lap. Verstappen commented on his team's 100th win, "It is amazing, I never expected to be on these kind of numbers myself as well, so we keep enjoying it and we keep working hard but this is another great day." In addition, this victory meant Verstappen matched three-time World Champion Ayrton Senna's number of victories at 41.

=== Race classification ===
Pos.	No.	Driver	Constructor	Laps	Time/Retired	Grid	Points
1	1	(Netherlands) Max Verstappen	Red Bull Racing-Honda RBPT	70	1:33:58.348	1	25
2	14	(Spain) Fernando Alonso	Aston Martin Aramco-Mercedes	70	+9.570	2	18
3	44	(United Kingdom) Lewis Hamilton	Mercedes	70	+14.168	3	15
4	16	(Monaco) Charles Leclerc	Ferrari	70	+18.648	10	12
5	55	(Spain) Carlos Sainz Jr.	Ferrari	70	+21.540	11	10
6	11	(Mexico) Sergio Pérez	Red Bull Racing-Honda RBPT	70	+51.028	12	9^{a}
7	23	(Thailand) Alexander Albon	Williams-Mercedes	70	+1:00.813	9	6
8	31	(France) Esteban Ocon	Alpine-Renault	70	+1:01.692	6	4
9	18	(Canada) Lance Stroll	Aston Martin Aramco-Mercedes	70	+1:04.402	16	2
10	77	(Finland) Valtteri Bottas	Alfa Romeo-Ferrari	70	+1:04.432	14	1
11	81	(Australia) Oscar Piastri	McLaren-Mercedes	70	+1:05.101	8	
12	10	(France) Pierre Gasly	Alpine-Renault	70	+1:05.249	15	
13	4	(United Kingdom) Lando Norris	McLaren-Mercedes	70	+1:08.363^{b}	7	
14	22	(Japan) Yuki Tsunoda	AlphaTauri-Honda RBPT	70	+1:13.423	19	
15	27	(Germany) Nico Hülkenberg	Haas-Ferrari	69	+1 lap	5	
16	24	(China) Zhou Guanyu	Alfa Romeo-Ferrari	69	+1 lap	20	
17	20	(Denmark) Kevin Magnussen	Haas-Ferrari	69	+1 lap	13	
18	21	(Netherlands) Nyck de Vries	AlphaTauri-Honda RBPT	69	+1 lap	17	
Ret	63	(United Kingdom) George Russell	Mercedes	53	Brakes	4	
Ret	2	(United States) Logan Sargeant	Williams-Mercedes	6	Oil leak	18	
Fastest lap: (Mexico) Sergio Pérez (Red Bull Racing- Honda RBPT) – 1:14.481 (lap 70)

Notes

- ^a – Includes one point for fastest lap.
- ^b – Lando Norris finished ninth, but he received a five-second time penalty for unsportsmanlike behaviour.

== Championship standings after the race ==
Drivers' Championship standings

	Pos.	Driver	Points
	1	(Netherlands) Max Verstappen	195
	2	(Mexico) Sergio Pérez	126
	3	(Spain) Fernando Alonso	117
	4	(United Kingdom) Lewis Hamilton	102
1	5	(Spain) Carlos Sainz Jr.	68

Constructors' Championship standings

Pos.	Constructor	Points
1	(Austria) Red Bull Racing-Honda RBPT	321
2	(Germany) Mercedes	167
3	(United Kingdom) Aston Martin Aramco-Mercedes	154
4	(Italy) Ferrari	122
5	(France) Alpine-Renault	44

- Note: Only the top five positions are included for both sets of standings.

Previous race: 2023 Spanish Grand Prix	FIA Formula One World Championship; 2023 season	Next race: 2023 Austrian Grand Prix
Previous race: 2022 Canadian Grand Prix	Canadian Grand Prix	Next race: 2024 Canadian Grand Prix
