= Lionel Froissart =

French journalist

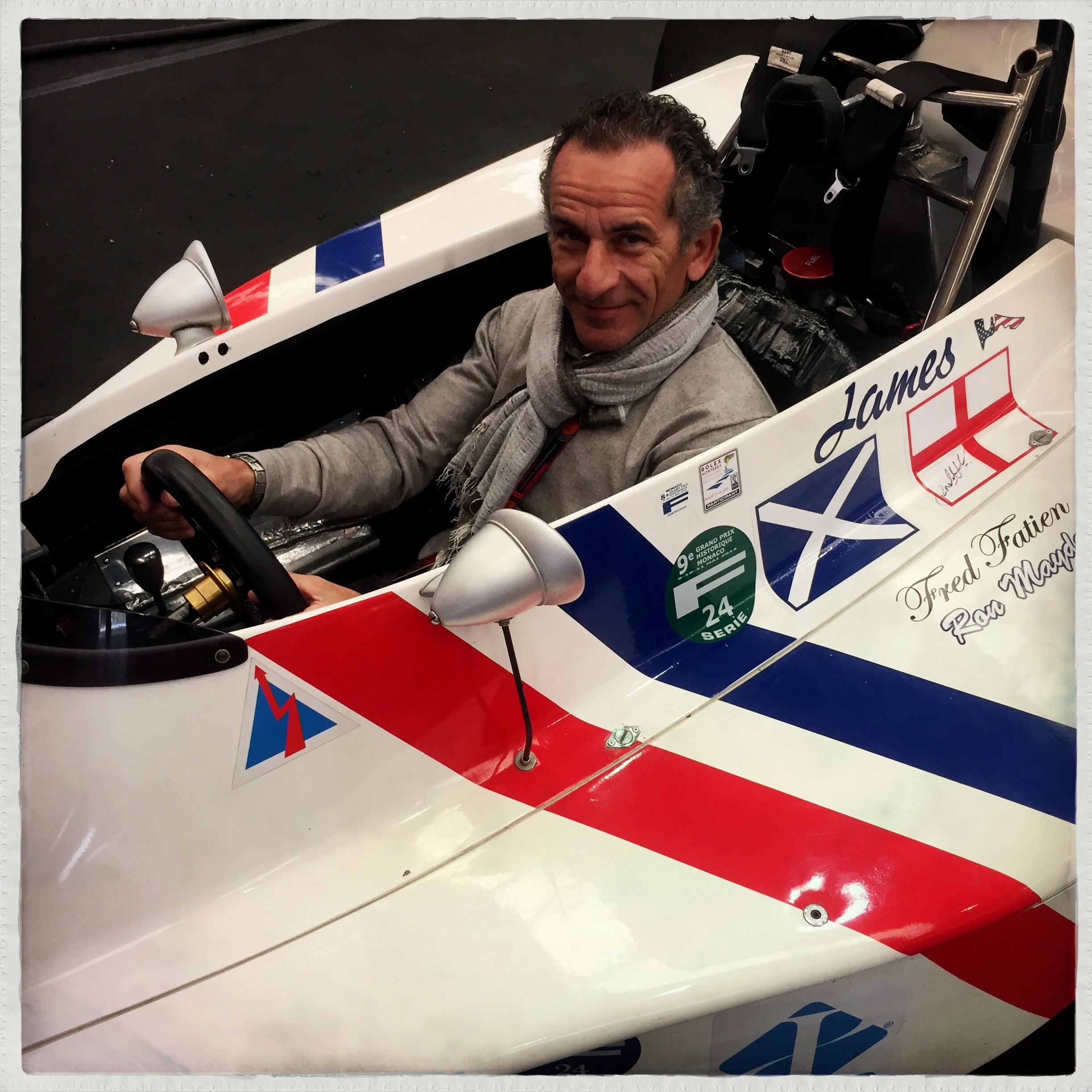
Lionel Froissart in 2015, behind the wheel of a Formula 1 vehicle

Lionel Froissart is a French sports journalist. He was born in 1958 in Paris. He worked for Libération for almost thirty years, where he specialized in F1 and tennis. He is known for his biography of Ayrton Senna, published in 2004. The 2007 novel Les boxeurs finissent mal… en général won the 2008 Sport-Scriptum prize for the best sports book of the year. Punto Basta, his new novel appeared in 2021.

After the 2022 Austrian Grand Prix he was fired after labeling Aston Martin F1 Team driver Lance Stroll as "The Autistic".

== Biography ==
Lionel Froissart was ten years old when he attended his first Formula One Grand Prix on July 7, 1968. It was Jacky Ickx first victory at the 1968 French Grand Prix on the Rouen-Les-Essarts.

He began his career as a journalist at Auto Hebdo in 1976, where he created the Kart racing section. He is also in charge of photographic reporting, immortalizing some of the drivers who became famous in their karting days. Shortly afterwards, he was asked to Road racing races in France. From 1981, he followed a number of Formula 1 Grands Prix for his magazine.

Between 1978 and 1981, he was one of three official Le Palace photographers.

In 1984, he spent the year following the Formula 1 season alongside French driver François Hesnault (Ligier). That same year, Ayrton Senna, whom Lionel Froissart had met in his Kart racing, also made his F1 debut.

In 1986, he was recruited by the newspaper Libération to work in the “Sports” section, where his work led him to cover the Formula 1 Grands Prix. He was also a commentator on F1 Grands Prix for the Screensport (TV channel), Canal+ Horizons and TMC. He then became deputy head of the sports department at Libération. He left Libération on January 6, 2015, becoming a freelance journalist.

Lionel Froissart also specializes in tennis, skiing and Boxing, to which he dedicated his first novel in 2007, Les boxeurs finissent mal... en général. In twelve chapters, like so many rounds, he brings to life the destinies of twelve boxers from different eras of the noble art. The book was awarded the Prix Sport Scriptum on November 26, 2008.

From 2003 to 2012, he was a columnist on Eurosport Auto Critiques program, before joining Canal+'s team of consultants for the “Les Spécialistes F1” program when the encrypted channel obtained the rights to broadcast the Formula 1 World Championship.

Speaking on RTBF during the 2022 Austrian Grand Prix, he criticized Aston Martin F1 Team driver Lance Stroll, calling him “autistic”. He was dismissed three days after this incident.
