= 2025 Austrian Grand Prix =

Race 11 of 24 in the 2025 Formula One World Championship
← Previous race	Next race →
- Layout of the Red Bull Ring, Austria

Race details
- Date: 29 June 2025
- Official name: Formula 1 MSC Cruises Austrian Grand Prix 2025
- Location: Red Bull Ring, Spielberg, Styria, Austria
- Course: Permanent racing facility
- Course length: 4.326 km (2.688 miles)
- Distance: 70 laps, 302.692 km (188.084 miles)
- Scheduled distance: 71 laps, 307.018 km (190.772 miles)
- Weather: Sunny
- Attendance: 300,000

Pole position
Driver	(United Kingdom) Lando Norris	McLaren-Mercedes
- Time: 1:03.971

Fastest lap
Driver	(Australia) Oscar Piastri	McLaren-Mercedes
- Time: 1:07.924 on lap 59 (lap record)

Podium
First	(United Kingdom) Lando Norris	McLaren-Mercedes
Second	(Australia) Oscar Piastri	McLaren-Mercedes
Third	(Monaco) Charles Leclerc	Ferrari

The 2025 Austrian Grand Prix (officially known as the Formula 1 MSC Cruises Austrian Grand Prix 2025) was a Formula One motor race held on 29 June 2025 at the Red Bull Ring in Spielberg, Styria. It was the eleventh round of the 2025 Formula One World Championship. Lando Norris of McLaren took pole position for the race, which he went on to win ahead of his teammate Oscar Piastri and Charles Leclerc of Ferrari. It was McLaren's first win in Austria since 2001.

The result enabled Norris to close the gap over Piastri to 15 points in the World Drivers' Championship. Following a first-lap-collision with Kimi Antonelli, Max Verstappen failed to score, meaning that his deficit to Piastri increased to 61 points, with George Russell nine points behind. Ferrari's third and fourth place finishes behind both McLaren drivers, saw them reclaim second place from Mercedes in the Constructors' Championship by a single point. Fourth-placed Red Bull (162 points) were 48 points adrift from Ferrari.

== Background ==
The event was held at the Red Bull Ring in Spielberg for the 21st time in the circuit's history, having previously held two editions of the Styrian Grand Prix, across the weekend of 27–29 June. The Grand Prix was the eleventh round of the 2025 Formula One World Championship and the 38th running of the Austrian Grand Prix as a round of the Formula One World Championship.

=== Championship standings before the race ===
Going into the weekend, Oscar Piastri led the Drivers' Championship with 198 points, twenty-two points ahead of his teammate Lando Norris in second, and 43 ahead of Max Verstappen in third. McLaren, with 374 points, led the Constructors' Championship from Mercedes and Ferrari, who are second and third with 199 and 183 points, respectively.

=== Entrants ===
The drivers and teams were the same as published in the season entry list with two exceptions; Yuki Tsunoda at Red Bull Racing was in the seat originally held by Liam Lawson before the latter was demoted back to Racing Bulls from the Japanese Grand Prix onward, and Franco Colapinto replaced Jack Doohan at Alpine from the Emilia Romagna Grand Prix onward until at least this event on a rotating seat basis.

During the first free practice session, two teams fielded drivers who had not raced in more than two Grands Prix, as required by the Formula One regulations:

- Alex Dunne for McLaren in place of Lando Norris, making his Formula One practice debut.
- Dino Beganovic for Ferrari in place of Charles Leclerc.

=== Tyre choices ===
Tyre supplier Pirelli brought the C3, C4, and C5 tyre compounds (designated hard, medium, and soft, respectively) for teams to use at the event.

== Practice ==
Three free practice sessions were held for the event. The first free practice session was held on 27 June 2025, at 13:30 local time (UTC+2), and was topped by George Russell of Mercedes ahead of Max Verstappen of Red Bull Racing and Oscar Piastri of McLaren. The second free practice session was held on the same day, at 17:00 local time, and was topped by Lando Norris of McLaren ahead of his teammate Piastri and Verstappen. The third free practice session was held on 28 June 2025, at 12:30 local time, and was topped by Norris ahead of his teammate Piastri and Verstappen.

== Qualifying ==
Qualifying was held on 28 June 2025, and was scheduled to start at 16:00 local time (UTC+2), but was delayed to 16:05 due to a crash in the preceding Formula 2 sprint race event. The session determined the starting grid order for the race.

=== Qualifying classification ===
Pos.	No.	Driver	Constructor	Qualifying times			Final grid
Pos.	No.	Driver	Constructor	Q1	Q2	Q3	Final grid
1	4	(United Kingdom) Lando Norris	McLaren-Mercedes	1:04.672	1:04.410	1:03.971	1
2	16	(Monaco) Charles Leclerc	Ferrari	1:05.197	1:04.734	1:04.492	2
3	81	(Australia) Oscar Piastri	McLaren-Mercedes	1:04.966	1:04.556	1:04.554	3
4	44	(United Kingdom) Lewis Hamilton	Ferrari	1:05.115	1:04.896	1:04.582	4
5	63	(United Kingdom) George Russell	Mercedes	1:05.189	1:04.860	1:04.763	5
6	30	(New Zealand) Liam Lawson	Racing Bulls-Honda RBPT	1:05.017	1:05.041	1:04.926	6
7	1	(Netherlands) Max Verstappen	Red Bull Racing-Honda RBPT	1:05.106	1:04.836	1:04.929	7
8	5	(Brazil) Gabriel Bortoleto	Kick Sauber-Ferrari	1:05.123	1:04.846	1:05.132	8
9	12	(Italy) Kimi Antonelli	Mercedes	1:05.178	1:05.052	1:05.276	9
10	10	(France) Pierre Gasly	Alpine-Renault	1:05.054	1:04.846	1:05.649	10
11	14	(Spain) Fernando Alonso	Aston Martin Aramco-Mercedes	1:05.197	1:05.128	N/A	11
12	23	(Thailand) Alexander Albon	Williams-Mercedes	1:05.143	1:05.205	N/A	12
13	6	(France) Isack Hadjar	Racing Bulls-Honda RBPT	1:05.063	1:05.226	N/A	13
14	43	(Argentina) Franco Colapinto	Alpine-Renault	1:05.278	1:05.288	N/A	14
15	87	(United Kingdom) Oliver Bearman	Haas-Ferrari	1:05.218	1:05.312	N/A	15
16	18	(Canada) Lance Stroll	Aston Martin Aramco-Mercedes	1:05.329	N/A	N/A	16
17	31	(France) Esteban Ocon	Haas-Ferrari	1:05.364	N/A	N/A	17
18	22	(Japan) Yuki Tsunoda	Red Bull Racing-Honda RBPT	1:05.369	N/A	N/A	18
19	55	(Spain) Carlos Sainz Jr.	Williams-Mercedes	1:05.582	N/A	N/A	19
20	27	(Germany) Nico Hülkenberg	Kick Sauber-Ferrari	1:05.606	N/A	N/A	20
107% time: 1:09.199

== Race ==
The race was held on 29 June 2025, and was scheduled to start at 15:00 local time (UTC+2), but was delayed to 15:15 as Carlos Sainz Jr. of Williams found himself stuck in first gear during the formation lap. The race was set to be run for 71 laps, but was shortened by one lap due to the aborted start procedure.

=== Race report ===
From pole position, Lando Norris of McLaren immediately covered off second-starting Charles Leclerc of Ferrari by moving right as the field charged towards the opening Niki Lauda Kurve. This put Leclerc at a disadvantage heading into the corner, allowing Norris's teammate Oscar Piastri to sweep round the outside and take second position. Utilising the slipstream, Piastri challenged Norris for the lead entering the Remus hairpin but could not pass. George Russell of Mercedes, who had started fifth, initially passed Leclerc's teammate Lewis Hamilton in a similar manner to how Leclerc had been passed by Piastri. However, Hamilton was able to draw back alongside entering the Schlossgold right-hander before ultimately repassing Russell around the outside of Rauch.

Further back in the pack, Russell's teammate Kimi Antonelli – who had started ninth – attempted to gain places by braking late down the inside of Remus. He locked up while doing so and made contact with Max Verstappen of Red Bull, eliminating both drivers on the spot. In order to clear the incident, the safety car was deployed; this was Verstappen's first retirement since the 2024 Australian Grand Prix. Antonelli was given a three-place penalty for the following British Grand Prix for causing the collision. The safety car came in at the end of lap 3, with Piastri staying close behind Norris as the McLaren pair pulled away from the chasing pack. On lap 9, Alexander Albon of Williams overtook Pierre Gasly of Alpine for sixth at Remus. Gasly had been the highest-placed driver to start on soft tires, and was now starting to suffer from tyre degradation as a result. On lap 11, Piastri passed Norris for the lead around the outside of Remus. Norris was behind at the second DRS detection point, and was therefore able to use DRS to pull alongside, then repass Piastri at Schlossgold to retake the race lead.

On lap 12, Gabriel Bortoleto of Sauber passed Gasly for seventh at Schlossgold. This put Bortoleto behind Albon, whom would be instructed to retire shortly after making his first pit stop. Up front, Piastri had continued to pressure Norris for the rest of the opening stint. On lap 20, Piastri locked up at Schlossgold whilst attempting to challenge Norris, who then pitted for hard tyres at the end of the lap. Despite having sustained a flat spot, Piastri stayed out in order to have younger tyres later in the race. Piastri pitted for hard tyres on lap 24, returning from his pit stop six seconds behind Norris. On lap 31, Yuki Tsunoda of Red Bull attempted to pass Franco Colapinto of Alpine for the 13th position down the inside at Schlossgold. Tsunoda's front-left wheel made contact with Colapinto's rear-right, causing the Alpine to spin into the gravel trap. Whilst both drivers continued in the race, Tsunoda would be given a ten-second time penalty for causing the collision. On lap 52, Norris made his second pit stop from the lead for medium tyres. Piastri followed him in the next lap, emerging three seconds behind.

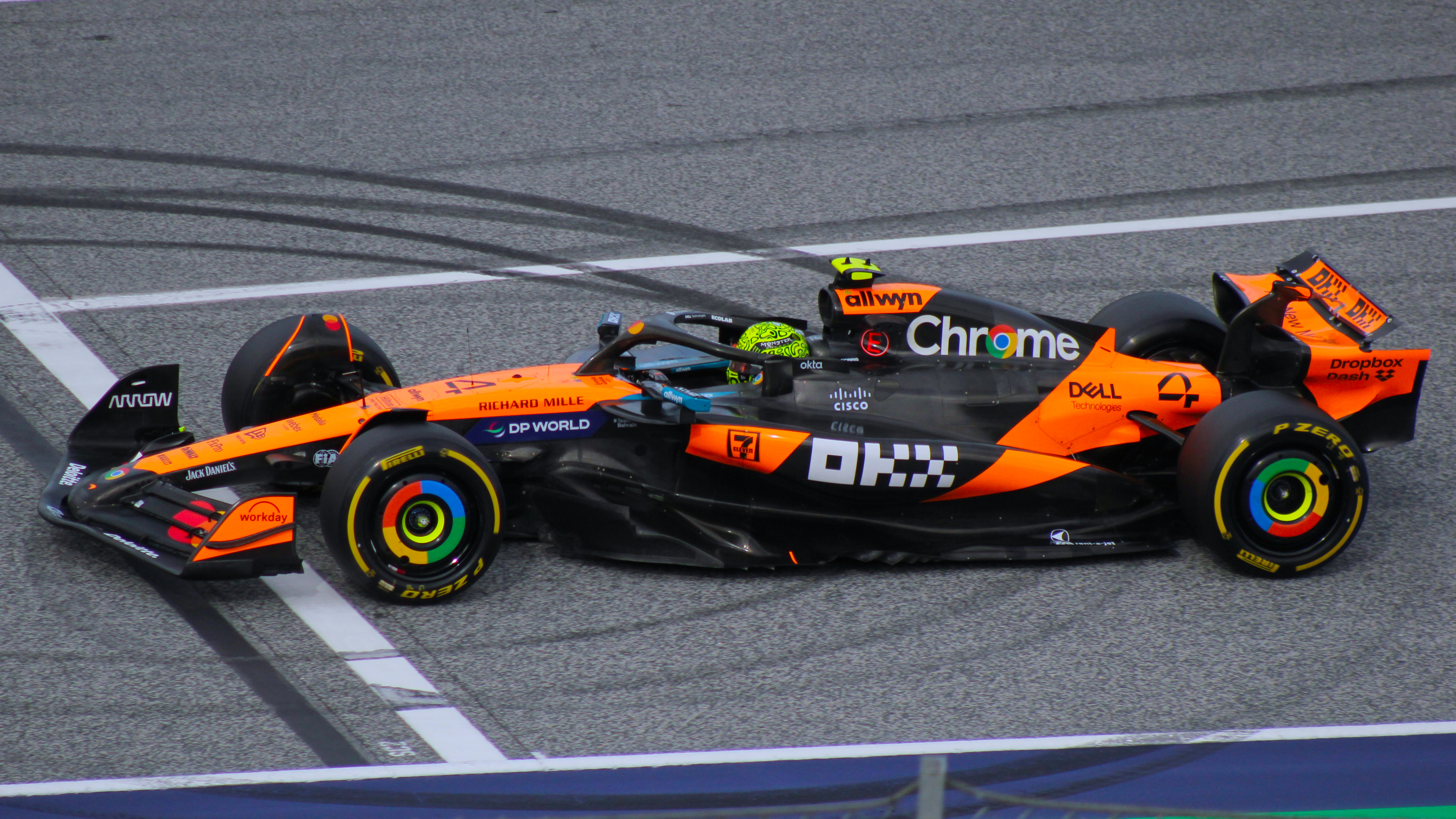
Norris took his third victory of the season ahead of Piastri and Leclerc.

When Piastri exited the pits he found himself close behind Tsunoda and Colapinto, whom were now fighting for the 15th position. As Piastri was lapping the pair, rather than fighting them for track position, he had the right to be waved through under blue flag rules. Colapinto and Tsunoda did not follow the blue flags, with Colapinto forcing Piastri on to the grass as the trio exited Remus. Colapinto received a five-second penalty for this incident, with him stating over team radio that he had not seen Piastri coming. This incident cost Piastri approximately a second to Norris. Whilst Piastri did close to the gap to Norris, he was not quite able to get with DRS range and therefore could not make an attempt for the lead. Norris took his third Grand Prix win of the season, and the seventh of his career.

Leclerc, Hamilton and Russell all had uneventful races on the way to positions third through fifth, whilst Liam Lawson of Racing Bulls and Fernando Alonso of Aston Martin were able to utilise a one-stop strategy to jump up the field, finishing sixth and seventh. Bortoleto fought with Alonso for seventh in the dying laps of the race and was unable to pass, eighth place bought Bortoleto his first points finish of his career. Bortoleto's teammate Nico Hülkenberg finished ninth and Esteban Ocon was tenth.

=== Race classification ===
Pos.	No.	Driver	Constructor	Laps	Time/Retired	Grid	Points
1	4	(United Kingdom) Lando Norris	McLaren-Mercedes	70	1:23:47.693	1	25
2	81	(Australia) Oscar Piastri	McLaren-Mercedes	70	+2.695	3	18
3	16	(Monaco) Charles Leclerc	Ferrari	70	+19.820	2	15
4	44	(United Kingdom) Lewis Hamilton	Ferrari	70	+29.020	4	12
5	63	(United Kingdom) George Russell	Mercedes	70	+1:02.396	5	10
6	30	(New Zealand) Liam Lawson	Racing Bulls-Honda RBPT	70	+1:07.754	6	8
7	14	(Spain) Fernando Alonso	Aston Martin Aramco-Mercedes	69	+1 lap	11	6
8	5	(Brazil) Gabriel Bortoleto	Kick Sauber-Ferrari	69	+1 lap	8	4
9	27	(Germany) Nico Hülkenberg	Kick Sauber-Ferrari	69	+1 lap	20	2
10	31	(France) Esteban Ocon	Haas-Ferrari	69	+1 lap	17	1
11	87	(United Kingdom) Oliver Bearman	Haas-Ferrari	69	+1 lap	15	
12	6	(France) Isack Hadjar	Racing Bulls-Honda RBPT	69	+1 lap	13	
13	10	(France) Pierre Gasly	Alpine-Renault	69	+1 lap	10	
14	18	(Canada) Lance Stroll	Aston Martin Aramco-Mercedes	69	+1 lap	16	
15	43	(Argentina) Franco Colapinto	Alpine-Renault	69	+1 lap^{1}	14	
16	22	(Japan) Yuki Tsunoda	Red Bull Racing-Honda RBPT	68	+2 laps	18	
Ret	23	(Thailand) Alexander Albon	Williams-Mercedes	15	Engine	12	
Ret	1	(Netherlands) Max Verstappen	Red Bull Racing-Honda RBPT	0	Collision	7	
Ret	12	(Italy) Kimi Antonelli	Mercedes	0	Collision	9	
DNS	55	(Spain) Carlos Sainz Jr.	Williams-Mercedes	0	Brakes	—^{2}	

Notes

- ^1 – Franco Colapinto received a five-second time penalty for forcing Oscar Piastri off track. His final position was not affected by the penalty.
- ^2 – Carlos Sainz Jr. did not start the race due to a brake issue during the formation lap. His place on the grid was left vacant.

== Championship standings after the race ==
Drivers' Championship standings

Pos.	Driver	Points
1	(Australia) Oscar Piastri	216
2	(United Kingdom) Lando Norris	201
3	(Netherlands) Max Verstappen	155
4	(United Kingdom) George Russell	146
5	(Monaco) Charles Leclerc	119

Constructors' Championship standings

	Pos.	Constructor	Points
	1	(United Kingdom) McLaren-Mercedes	417
1	2	(Italy) Ferrari	210
1	3	(Germany) Mercedes	209
	4	(Austria) Red Bull Racing-Honda RBPT	162
	5	(United Kingdom) Williams-Mercedes	55

- Note: Only the top five positions are included for both sets of standings.

== See also ==
- 2025 Spielberg Formula 2 round
- 2025 Spielberg Formula 3 round

Previous race: 2025 Canadian Grand Prix	FIA Formula One World Championship; 2025 season	Next race: 2025 British Grand Prix
Previous race: 2024 Austrian Grand Prix	Austrian Grand Prix	Next race: 2026 Austrian Grand Prix
