= 2024 Austrian Grand Prix =

Formula One motor race

Race 11 of 24 in the 2024 Formula One World Championship
← Previous race	Next race →
- Layout of the Red Bull Ring

Race details
- Date: 30 June 2024
- Official name: Formula 1 Qatar Airways Austrian Grand Prix 2024
- Location: Red Bull Ring; Spielberg, Styria, Austria
- Course: Permanent racing facility
- Course length: 4.318 km (2.683 miles)
- Distance: 71 laps, 306.452 km (190.420 miles)
- Weather: Partly cloudy
- Attendance: 302,000

Pole position
Driver	(Netherlands) Max Verstappen	Red Bull Racing-Honda RBPT
- Time: 1:04.314

Fastest lap
Driver	(Spain) Fernando Alonso	Aston Martin Aramco-Mercedes
- Time: 1:07.694 on lap 70

Podium
First	(United Kingdom) George Russell	Mercedes
Second	(Australia) Oscar Piastri	McLaren-Mercedes
Third	(Spain) Carlos Sainz Jr.	Ferrari

The 2024 Austrian Grand Prix (officially known as the Formula 1 Qatar Airways Austrian Grand Prix 2024) was a Formula One motor race that was held on 30 June 2024, at the Red Bull Ring in Spielberg, Austria. It was the eleventh round of the 2024 Formula One World Championship and the third Grand Prix weekend of the season to utilise the sprint format.

Red Bull Racing's Max Verstappen won the sprint from pole position, and also took pole position for the main race. Verstappen led the majority of the race, but with eight laps to go Verstappen and McLaren's Lando Norris collided as they fought for the lead. This dropped both drivers down the order, with Verstappen recovering to fifth and Norris retiring because of damage sustained from the collision. George Russell took his second career race win in Formula One, as well as Mercedes's first race victory since the 2022 São Paulo Grand Prix. Russell was joined on the podium by Norris's teammate Oscar Piastri, and Ferrari driver Carlos Sainz Jr.

Following the race, the top five for both sets of standings remained unchanged, with Verstappen increasing his lead over Norris to 81 points. Charles Leclerc trailed Norris by six points in third. Red Bull extended their lead in the standings to 64 points over Ferrari.

== Background ==
The event was held at the Red Bull Ring in Spielberg for the 20th time in the circuit's history, across the weekend of 28–30 June. The Grand Prix was the eleventh round of the 2024 Formula One World Championship and the 37th running of the Austrian Grand Prix as a round of the Formula One World Championship. It was also the third Grand Prix of six in the season to utilise the sprint format and the third time overall to feature it.

=== Championship standings before the race ===
Going into the weekend, Max Verstappen led the Drivers' Championship with 219 points, 69 points ahead of Lando Norris in second, and 71 ahead of Charles Leclerc in third. Red Bull Racing, with 330 points, led the Constructors' Championship from Ferrari and McLaren, who are second and third with 270 and 237 points, respectively.

=== Entrants ===
The drivers and teams were the same as the season entry list with no additional stand-in drivers for the race.

=== Tyre choices ===
Tyre supplier Pirelli brought the C3, C4, and C5 tyre compounds (the three softest in their range) designated hard, medium, and soft, respectively, for teams to use at this event.

=== Track changes ===
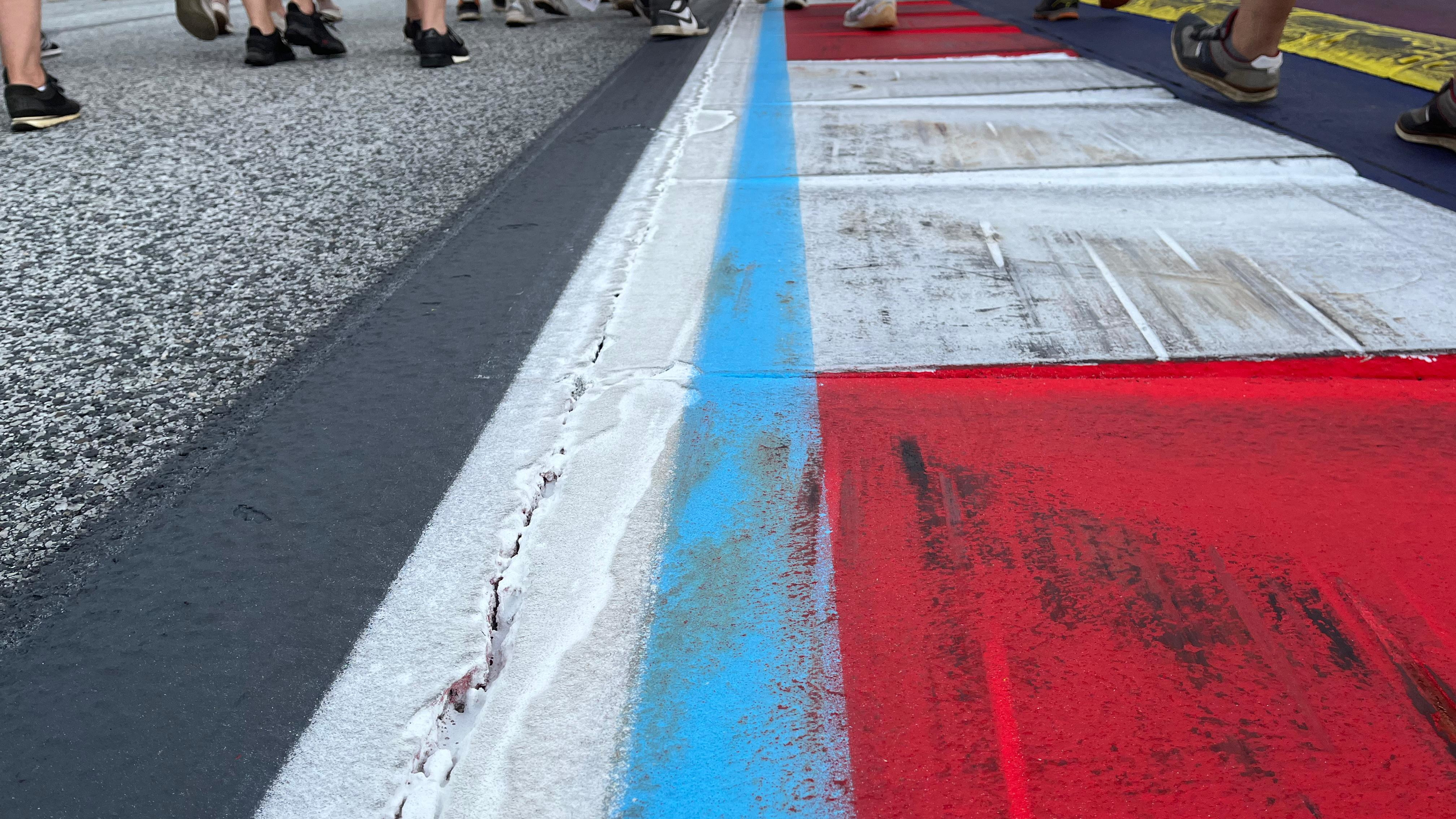
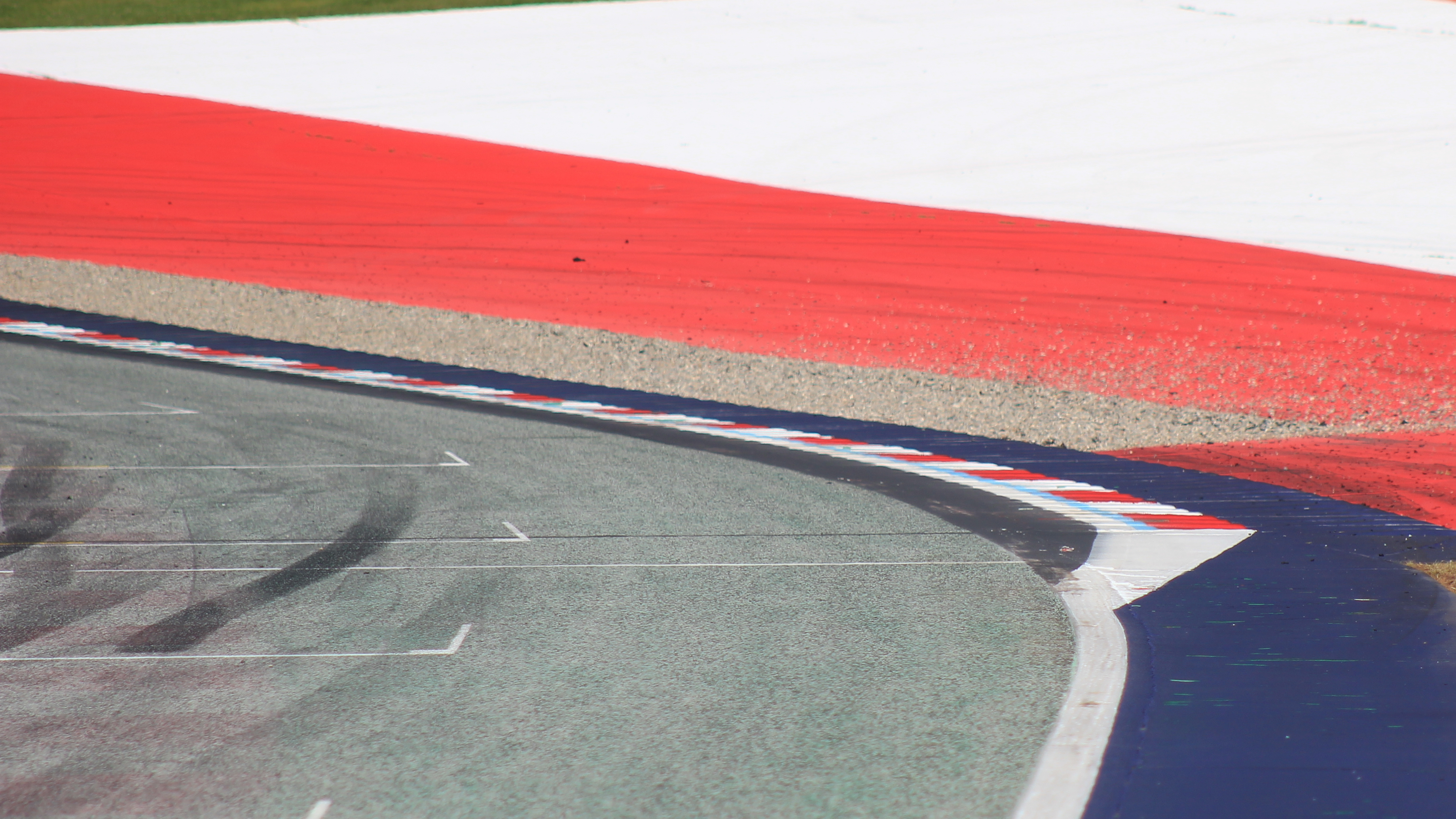
New light blue stripes between the track limits white line and the kerb were painted. In addition new gravel traps between the track and the run-off area were installed.

After the previous iteration of the race saw 1,200 potential track limit violations, the Red Bull Ring took steps to prevent a repeat of the issues. Gravel traps were installed and some track limits were moved closer to existing gravel traps to deter drivers from running wide. Additionally, a contrasting blue line on the outside of the white track limits line was painted to increase visibility and contrast for stewards reviewing possible violations.

== Practice ==
The only free practice session was held on 28 June 2024, at 12:30 local time (UTC+2), and was topped by Max Verstappen of Red Bull Racing ahead of Oscar Piastri of McLaren and Charles Leclerc of Ferrari.

== Sprint qualifying ==
Sprint qualifying was held on 28 June 2024, at 16:30 local time (UTC+2), and determined the starting grid order for the sprint.

=== Sprint qualifying classification ===
Pos.	No.	Driver	Constructor	Qualifying times			Sprint grid
Pos.	No.	Driver	Constructor	SQ1	SQ2	SQ3	Sprint grid
1	1	(Netherlands) Max Verstappen	Red Bull Racing-Honda RBPT	1:05.690	1:05.186	1:04.686	1
2	4	(United Kingdom) Lando Norris	McLaren-Mercedes	1:05.786	1:05.561	1:04.779	2
3	81	(Australia) Oscar Piastri	McLaren-Mercedes	1:06.081	1:05.379	1:04.987	3
4	63	(United Kingdom) George Russell	Mercedes	1:05.764	1:05.325	1:05.054	4
5	55	(Spain) Carlos Sainz Jr.	Ferrari	1:05.781	1:05.435	1:05.126	5
6	44	(United Kingdom) Lewis Hamilton	Mercedes	1:06.504	1:05.539	1:05.270	6
7	11	(Mexico) Sergio Pérez	Red Bull Racing-Honda RBPT	1:06.256	1:05.612	1:06.008	7
8	31	(France) Esteban Ocon	Alpine-Renault	1:06.343	1:05.686	1:06.101	8
9	10	(France) Pierre Gasly	Alpine-Renault	1:06.465	1:05.757	1:06.624	9
10	16	(Monaco) Charles Leclerc	Ferrari	1:06.149	1:05.526	No time	10
11	20	(Denmark) Kevin Magnussen	Haas-Ferrari	1:06.387	1:05.806	N/A	11
12	18	(Canada) Lance Stroll	Aston Martin Aramco-Mercedes	1:06.037	1:05.847	N/A	12
13	14	(Spain) Fernando Alonso	Aston Martin Aramco-Mercedes	1:06.487	1:05.878	N/A	13
14	22	(Japan) Yuki Tsunoda	RB-Honda RBPT	1:06.557	1:05.960	N/A	14
15	2	(United States) Logan Sargeant	Williams-Mercedes	1:06.518	No time	N/A	15
16	3	(Australia) Daniel Ricciardo	RB-Honda RBPT	1:06.581	N/A	N/A	16
17	27	(Germany) Nico Hülkenberg	Haas-Ferrari	1:06.583	N/A	N/A	17
18	77	(Finland) Valtteri Bottas	Kick Sauber-Ferrari	1:06.725	N/A	N/A	18
19	23	(Thailand) Alexander Albon	Williams-Mercedes	1:06.754	N/A	N/A	PL^{a}
20	24	(China) Zhou Guanyu	Kick Sauber-Ferrari	1:07.197	N/A	N/A	19
107% time: 1:10.288

Notes

- ^a – Alexander Albon qualified 19th, but was required to start the sprint from the pit lane due to changes made to the set up of his car during parc fermé.

== Sprint ==
The sprint was held on 29 June 2024, at 12:00 local time (UTC+2), and was scheduled to be run for 24 laps before being shortened by one lap due to an aborted start procedure.

=== Sprint classification ===
Pos.	No.	Driver	Constructor	Laps^{a}	Time/Retired	Grid	Points
1	1	(Netherlands) Max Verstappen	Red Bull Racing-Honda RBPT	23	26:41.389	1	8
2	81	(Australia) Oscar Piastri	McLaren-Mercedes	23	+4.616	3	7
3	4	(United Kingdom) Lando Norris	McLaren-Mercedes	23	+5.348	2	6
4	63	(United Kingdom) George Russell	Mercedes	23	+8.354	4	5
5	55	(Spain) Carlos Sainz Jr.	Ferrari	23	+9.989	5	4
6	44	(United Kingdom) Lewis Hamilton	Mercedes	23	+11.207	6	3
7	16	(Monaco) Charles Leclerc	Ferrari	23	+13.424	10	2
8	11	(Mexico) Sergio Pérez	Red Bull Racing-Honda RBPT	23	+17.409	7	1
9	20	(Denmark) Kevin Magnussen	Haas-Ferrari	23	+24.067	11	
10	18	(Canada) Lance Stroll	Aston Martin Aramco-Mercedes	23	+30.175	12	
11	31	(France) Esteban Ocon	Alpine-Renault	23	+30.839	8	
12	10	(France) Pierre Gasly	Alpine-Renault	23	+31.308	9	
13	22	(Japan) Yuki Tsunoda	RB-Honda RBPT	23	+35.452	14	
14	3	(Australia) Daniel Ricciardo	RB-Honda RBPT	23	+39.397	16	
15	14	(Spain) Fernando Alonso	Aston Martin Aramco-Mercedes	23	+43.155	13	
16	2	(United States) Logan Sargeant	Williams-Mercedes	23	+44.076	15	
17	23	(Thailand) Alexander Albon	Williams-Mercedes	23	+44.673	PL	
18	77	(Finland) Valtteri Bottas	Kick Sauber-Ferrari	23	+46.511	18	
19	27	(Germany) Nico Hülkenberg	Haas-Ferrari	23	+48.423^{b}	17	
20	24	(China) Zhou Guanyu	Kick Sauber-Ferrari	23	+53.143	19	
Fastest lap: (United Kingdom) Lando Norris (McLaren-Mercedes) – 1:08.935 (lap 2)

Notes

- ^a – The sprint distance was scheduled to be completed for 24 laps before being shortened by one lap due to an aborted start procedure.
- ^b – Nico Hülkenberg finished 14th on track, but received a post-sprint ten-second time penalty for forcing Fernando Alonso off track at turn 3.

== Qualifying ==
Qualifying was held on 29 June 2024, at 16:00 local time (UTC+2), and determined the starting order for the main race.

=== Qualifying classification ===
Pos.	No.	Driver	Constructor	Qualifying times			Final grid
Pos.	No.	Driver	Constructor	Q1	Q2	Q3	Final grid
1	1	(Netherlands) Max Verstappen	Red Bull Racing-Honda RBPT	1:05.336	1:04.469	1:04.314	1
2	4	(United Kingdom) Lando Norris	McLaren-Mercedes	1:05.450	1:05.103	1:04.718	2
3	63	(United Kingdom) George Russell	Mercedes	1:05.585	1:05.016	1:04.840	3
4	55	(Spain) Carlos Sainz Jr.	Ferrari	1:05.263	1:05.016	1:04.851	4
5	44	(United Kingdom) Lewis Hamilton	Mercedes	1:05.541	1:05.053	1:04.903	5
6	16	(Monaco) Charles Leclerc	Ferrari	1:05.509	1:05.104	1:05.044	6
7	81	(Australia) Oscar Piastri	McLaren-Mercedes	1:05.311	1:05.070	1:05.048	7
8	11	(Mexico) Sergio Pérez	Red Bull Racing-Honda RBPT	1:05.587	1:05.144	1:05.202	8
9	27	(Germany) Nico Hülkenberg	Haas-Ferrari	1:05.596	1:05.262	1:05.385	9
10	31	(France) Esteban Ocon	Alpine-Renault	1:05.574	1:05.274	1:05.883	10
11	3	(Australia) Daniel Ricciardo	RB-Honda RBPT	1:05.569	1:05.289	N/A	11
12	20	(Denmark) Kevin Magnussen	Haas-Ferrari	1:05.508	1:05.347	N/A	12
13	10	(France) Pierre Gasly	Alpine-Renault	1:05.598	1:05.359	N/A	13
14	22	(Japan) Yuki Tsunoda	RB-Honda RBPT	1:05.563	1:05.412	N/A	14
15	14	(Spain) Fernando Alonso	Aston Martin Aramco-Mercedes	1:05.656	1:05.639	N/A	15
16	23	(Thailand) Alexander Albon	Williams-Mercedes	1:05.736	N/A	N/A	16
17	18	(Canada) Lance Stroll	Aston Martin Aramco-Mercedes	1:05.819	N/A	N/A	17
18	77	(Finland) Valtteri Bottas	Kick Sauber-Ferrari	1:05.847	N/A	N/A	18
19	2	(United States) Logan Sargeant	Williams-Mercedes	1:05.856	N/A	N/A	19
20	24	(China) Zhou Guanyu	Kick Sauber-Ferrari	1:06.061	N/A	N/A	PL^{a}
107% time: 1:09.831

Notes

- ^a – Zhou Guanyu qualified 20th, but was required to start the race from the pit lane due to changes made to the set up of his car during parc fermé.

== Race ==
The race was held on 30 June 2024, at 15:00 local time (UTC+2), and was run for 71 laps.

=== Race report ===
At the start, Verstappen got a clear getaway from Norris while the Ferrari of Charles Leclerc and the Williams of Logan Sargeant both sustained front wing damage in separate incidents and had to pit for repairs. Throughout the race, the Alpines of Esteban Ocon and Pierre Gasly were involved in a battle with Gasly winning out. Verstappen kept his lead through the first round of pit stops from Norris; during his second stop on lap 52, his crew swapped him into a pair of older medium tyres. However, the pitstop was a slow six seconds because of issues with the left rear tyre; this was further compounded as Verstappen was held to give way to Norris who was in the pit lane for his own pit stop. Norris closed the gap and would make several overtake attempts at turn 3 over the following laps. Verstappen successfully defended against Norris, who would be penalised for breaching track limits.

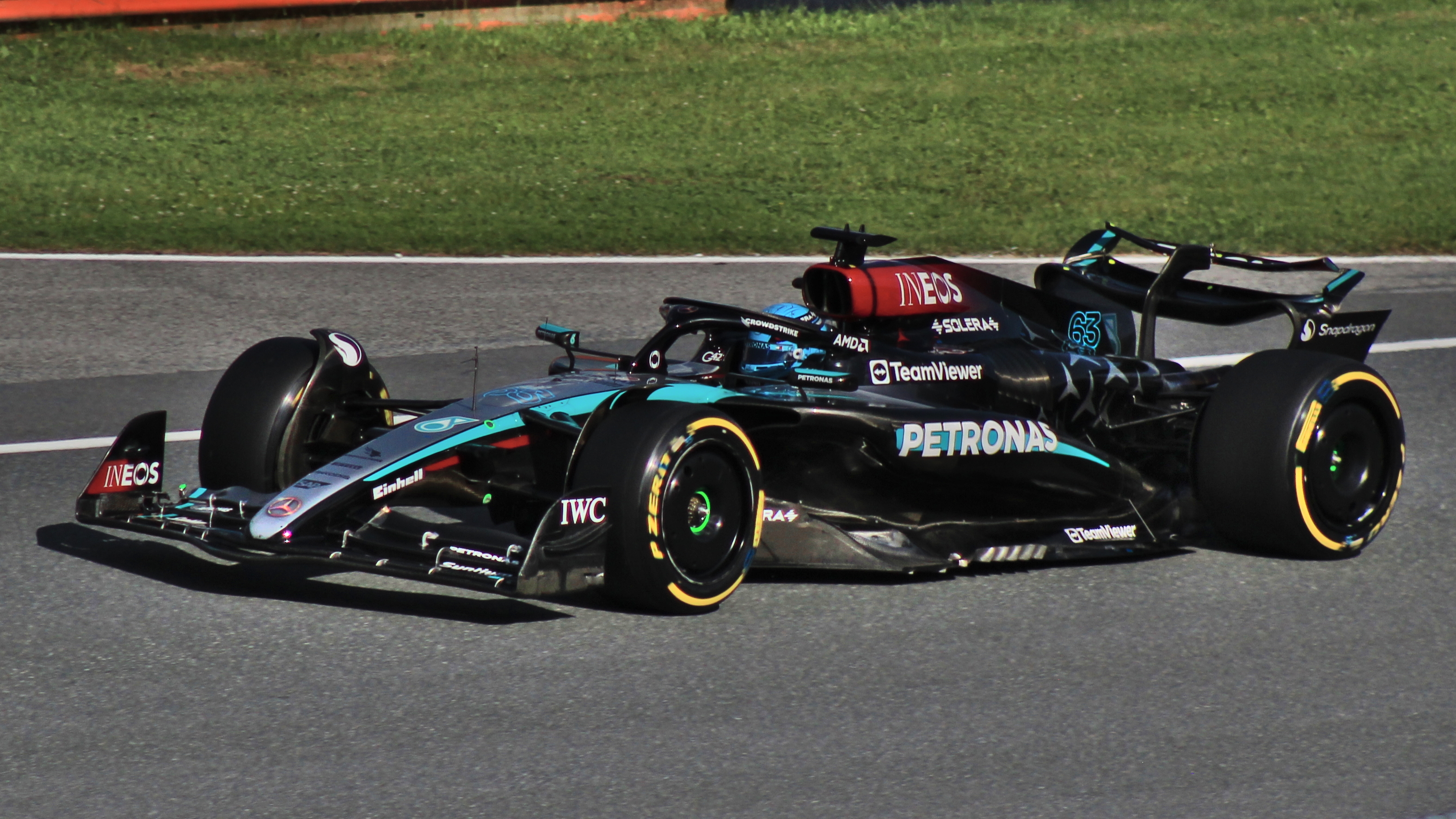
Russell took his and Mercedes's first victory of the season.

With eight laps remaining, Norris attempted an overtake on the outside line at turn 3, but there was a collision with Verstappen as the latter tried to block him off. Both of them sustained punctures, with third-placed driver George Russell taking the lead as Verstappen and Norris had to pit. Verstappen continued at low speed while Norris's tyre punctured at high speed, causing race-ending damage to his McLaren. Verstappen fitted new tyres and would eventually recover to fifth; the race stewards gave Verstappen a ten-second time penalty for causing the collision. Russell won the race from Oscar Piastri, who passed Carlos Sainz Jr. for second with seven laps remaining, as Sainz followed in third and Russell's teammate Lewis Hamilton finished fourth from Verstappen.

=== Post-race debrief ===
When asked about his friendship with Verstappen off-track and how the clash would affect them, Norris stated his belief that "He (Verstappen) was in the wrong, so he's the one that should say something, not me." Verstappen on the other hand stated he would like to "let things cool off" and was "more annoyed with just how the performance of the race was, the mistakes that we made that normally we don’t make.” Verstappen later said that the crash did not affect his friendship with Norris. McLaren team principal Andrea Stella claimed that "the entire population in the world [knows] who is responsible, except for a group of people," comparing the incident to moments in Verstappen's past rivalry with Hamilton during the 2021 season. Russell stated he was happy to "pick up the pieces" of Norris and Verstappen's incident to win.

=== Race classification ===
Pos.	No.	Driver	Constructor	Laps	Time/Retired	Grid	Points
1	63	(United Kingdom) George Russell	Mercedes	71	1:24:22.798	3	25
2	81	(Australia) Oscar Piastri	McLaren-Mercedes	71	+1.906	7	18
3	55	(Spain) Carlos Sainz Jr.	Ferrari	71	+4.533	4	15
4	44	(United Kingdom) Lewis Hamilton	Mercedes	71	+23.142	5	12
5	1	(Netherlands) Max Verstappen	Red Bull Racing-Honda RBPT	71	+37.253^{a}	1	10
6	27	(Germany) Nico Hülkenberg	Haas-Ferrari	71	+54.088	9	8
7	11	(Mexico) Sergio Pérez	Red Bull Racing-Honda RBPT	71	+54.672	8	6
8	20	(Denmark) Kevin Magnussen	Haas-Ferrari	71	+1:00.355	12	4
9	3	(Australia) Daniel Ricciardo	RB-Honda RBPT	71	+1:01.169	11	2
10	10	(France) Pierre Gasly	Alpine-Renault	71	+1:01.766	13	1
11	16	(Monaco) Charles Leclerc	Ferrari	71	+1:07.056	6	
12	31	(France) Esteban Ocon	Alpine-Renault	71	+1:08.325	10	
13	18	(Canada) Lance Stroll	Aston Martin Aramco-Mercedes	70	+1 lap	17	
14	22	(Japan) Yuki Tsunoda	RB-Honda RBPT	70	+1 lap	14	
15	23	(Thailand) Alexander Albon	Williams-Mercedes	70	+1 lap^{b}	16	
16	77	(Finland) Valtteri Bottas	Kick Sauber-Ferrari	70	+1 lap	18	
17	24	(China) Zhou Guanyu	Kick Sauber-Ferrari	70	+1 lap	PL	
18	14	(Spain) Fernando Alonso	Aston Martin Aramco-Mercedes	70	+1 lap	15	
19	2	(United States) Logan Sargeant	Williams-Mercedes	69	+2 laps	19	
20	4	(United Kingdom) Lando Norris	McLaren-Mercedes	64	Collision damage^{c}	2	
Fastest lap: (Spain) Fernando Alonso (Aston Martin Aramco-Mercedes) – 1:07.694 (lap 70)

Notes

- ^a – Max Verstappen received a ten-second time penalty for causing a collision with Lando Norris. His final position was not affected by the penalty.
- ^b – Alexander Albon finished 14th, but received a five-second time penalty for crossing the line at pit entry.
- ^c – Lando Norris was classified as he completed over 90% of the race distance. He also received a five-second time penalty for exceeding track limits. The penalty made no difference as he was classified in the last position.

== Championship standings after the race ==
Drivers' Championship standings

Pos.	Driver	Points
1	(Netherlands) Max Verstappen	237
2	(United Kingdom) Lando Norris	156
3	(Monaco) Charles Leclerc	150
4	(Spain) Carlos Sainz Jr.	135
5	(Mexico) Sergio Pérez	118

Constructors' Championship standings

Pos.	Constructor	Points
1	(Austria) Red Bull Racing-Honda RBPT	355
2	(Italy) Ferrari	291
3	(United Kingdom) McLaren-Mercedes	268
4	(Germany) Mercedes	196
5	(United Kingdom) Aston Martin Aramco-Mercedes	58

- Note: Only the top five positions are included for both sets of standings.

== See also ==
- 2024 Spielberg Formula 2 round
- 2024 Spielberg Formula 3 round

== Notes ==
Previous race: 2024 Spanish Grand Prix	FIA Formula One World Championship; 2024 season	Next race: 2024 British Grand Prix
Previous race: 2023 Austrian Grand Prix	Austrian Grand Prix	Next race: 2025 Austrian Grand Prix
