= Austrian Grand Prix =

Motor racing event

- Red Bull Ring

Race information
- Number of times held: 45
- First held: 1963
- Most wins (drivers): (Netherlands) Max Verstappen (4)
- Most wins (constructors): (Italy) Ferrari (United Kingdom) McLaren (Germany) Mercedes (7)
- Circuit length: 4.326 km (2.688 miles)
- Race length: 307.026 km (190.777 miles)
- Laps: 71

Last race (2026)

Pole position
- (United Kingdom) George Russell; Mercedes; 1:06.113

Podium
- 1. (United Kingdom) G. Russell; Mercedes; 1:26:37.979; 2. (Netherlands) M. Verstappen; Red Bull Racing-Red Bull Ford; +1.611; 3. (Italy) K. Antonelli; Mercedes; +1.986

Fastest lap
- (Italy) Kimi Antonelli; Mercedes; 1:10.374

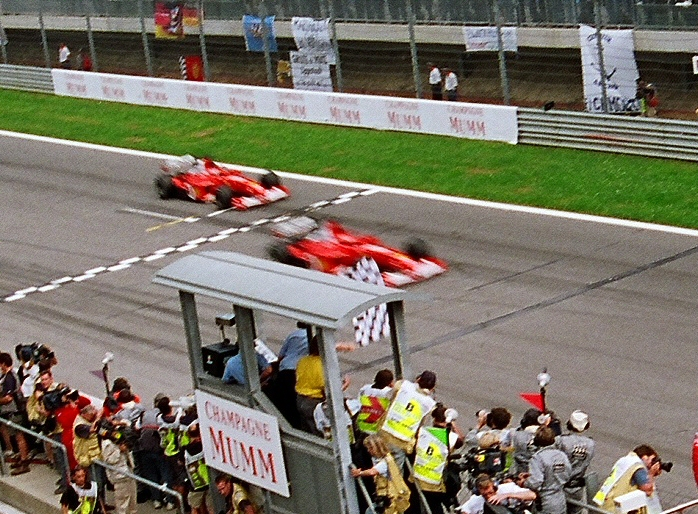
The controversial Ferrari 1–2 crossing the finish line in 2002.

The Austrian Grand Prix (German: Großer Preis von Österreich) is a Fédération Internationale de l'Automobile sanctioned motor racing event that was held in 1964, 1970–1987, and 1997–2003. It returned to the Formula One calendar in 2014, where it has remained since. It was first held at the Zeltweg Air Base for its first, non-Championship running. Since 1970, the race has been held at the Österreichring, currently known as the Red Bull Ring due to its ownership by the Austrian drinks company of the same name.

Ever since it returned to the calendar, the Austrian Grand Prix is typically held during the mid-season rounds of the Formula One World Championship, with one exception: the Austrian Grand Prix was held as the season opener in 2020, the only time in its history this has happened, due to the impact of the COVID-19 pandemic and subsequent lockdowns disrupting the season. Also in 2020, an additional race, held also at the Red Bull Ring, was added to the calendar called the Styrian Grand Prix. It was held twice, facilitating a double-header to maximise the number of Grands Prix during seasons that were affected by the pandemic. Following a 16-year extension, Formula One is set to race in Austria until 2041.

== History ==
The Austrian Grand Prix has been held at two different locations in southeastern Austria, being originally held in Zeltweg, about 70 km (43 mi) west of Graz. Since 1969 the Austrian Grand Prix has taken place in neighbouring Spielberg, with the two venues being within approximately 4 km (2.5 mi) of each other. It was first held at the Zeltweg Air Base for six years, before a permanent track, originally called the Österreichring and later known as the A-1 ring and Red Bull Ring, was built.

=== Zeltweg Airfield circuit ===
A non-championship event was held in 1963 at a race track on the Zeltweg Airfield and it was won by Australian Jack Brabham. The first championship event took place in the following year, and Italian Lorenzo Bandini won his only Formula One championship race in a Ferrari. The race was a success, but the track was deemed too dangerous; it was narrow and very bumpy, and spectators complained of poor viewing areas. The FIA removed the race from the F1 calendar until a suitable track was built.

The event was run in 1965 as a non-championship sports car race, the Zeltweg 200 Miles, before being adopted by the World Sportscar Championship from 1966 to 1969 as the 1000 km Zeltweg.

=== Österreichring ===
From 1970 until 1987, the event was held at the Österreichring (translated literally as "Austria circuit", also located near Zeltweg). It was built in the scenic Styrian mountains and it was a fast, flowing track where every corner was high speed and long. The Austrian Grand Prix was designated the European Grand Prix once, 1975, when this title was an honorary designation given each year to one Grand Prix race in Europe. The very fast track was popular with drivers, and the events were moderately successful. The first race on this track was dominated by Ferrari, with their more powerful Flat-12 engines enabled them to be 10 mph faster – which is a lot in racing terms. The 1971 race saw Swiss driver Jo Siffert dominate in his BRM and Briton Jackie Stewart took his second Drivers' Championship. The 1975 event was marred by the fatal accident of American Mark Donohue, and the race itself was rain-soaked and was won by Vittorio Brambilla, winning the only F1 race of his career, and, true to form, he crashed into the guardrail and broke the nose of his car shortly after crossing the finish line when the race was stopped early because the rain got worse (although the race started after 1 hour and 15 minutes of delay, due the heavy rain, with the drivers doing extra practice during this time). In 1976, home favourite Niki Lauda's appalling crash at the Nürburgring caused him to miss the race, which was won by Briton John Watson in the short-lived Penske F1 team, winning his first Formula One race (and Penske's only win in the category).

1976 had seen the Voest-Hugel corner changed slightly into one corner instead of two corners; but 1977 saw a slow three-corner chicane installed at Voest-Hugel, which was where Donohue had crashed two years before. What was the fastest corner on the track was now the slowest corner there and would become known as the Hella-Licht Chicane. This race was won by Australian Alan Jones in a Shadow; and like with Brambilla and Watson, it was his first Grand Prix victory. 1978 saw the dominant Lotus 79s on the front row, and American Mario Andretti crashed at the Glatz Kurve on the first lap, and his teammate, Swede Ronnie Peterson took victory. 1979 started to show the superiority of turbo-charged engines on this fast and high-altitude circuit. Although Jones won again in a Williams, Jean-Pierre Jabouille and Rene Arnoux in their Renaults were able to dominate this event and also the following year's race, which Jabouille won. 1981 saw three turbo-charged cars dominate the front row; and into the race, the immense power and dreadful handling of Didier Pironi's Ferrari helped him to hold up four better handling cars and get into a five-way battle for third place, which went on for a while but the four cars eventually passed him, one of which was Jacques Laffite who went on to win the race. 1982 saw a spectacular show in which five turbocharged cars dominated the grid; all but one of these cars retired with mechanical problems, including Italian Riccardo Patrese who had a spectacular accident at the Texaco Bends, and Frenchman Alain Prost whose engine expired with a few laps to go while in the lead. After Prost's retirement, the race turned into a dead-heat sprint between Italian Elio de Angelis in a Lotus and Finn Keke Rosberg in a Williams. In the beginning, Rosberg had been steadily chipping away at de Angelis; but after Prost retired, Rosberg began to make up 1.5 seconds a lap on de Angelis; and on the last lap the two so-far winless drivers battled for victory, and de Angelis was able to hold off Rosberg and win by less than half a car's length; 0.05 seconds. 1984 saw Lauda finally take victory at home Grand Prix in his McLaren, and Prost won the next two races. The 1985 race saw a fearsome crash at the Panorama Curve when Andrea de Cesaris spectacularly rolled his Ligier, which led to him being fired from the team. 1986 saw Austrian driver Gerhard Berger lead the early laps in his 1,400 bhp (1,044 kW; 1,419 PS) Benetton-BMW, but electrical problems saw his race ruined allowing Alain Prost to take the win by over a lap from the Ferraris of Michele Alboreto and Stefan Johansson.

The 1987 race was restarted twice due to accidents on the narrow pit-straight grid; and this track was also deemed too dangerous by FIA standards, because of the number of high-speed corners, lack of protection from trees and embankments and accidents at the start of many races on the narrow and confined pit straight. Increasing speeds were also a growing problem at the Österreichring: that year, polesitter Nelson Piquet averaged 159.457 mph (255.756 km/h) in his 1,100 hp Honda-powered Williams. Piquet finished second to his teammate, Briton Nigel Mansell. Attempts to bring the race back were unsuccessful, and the event disappeared for a decade.

=== A1-Ring ===
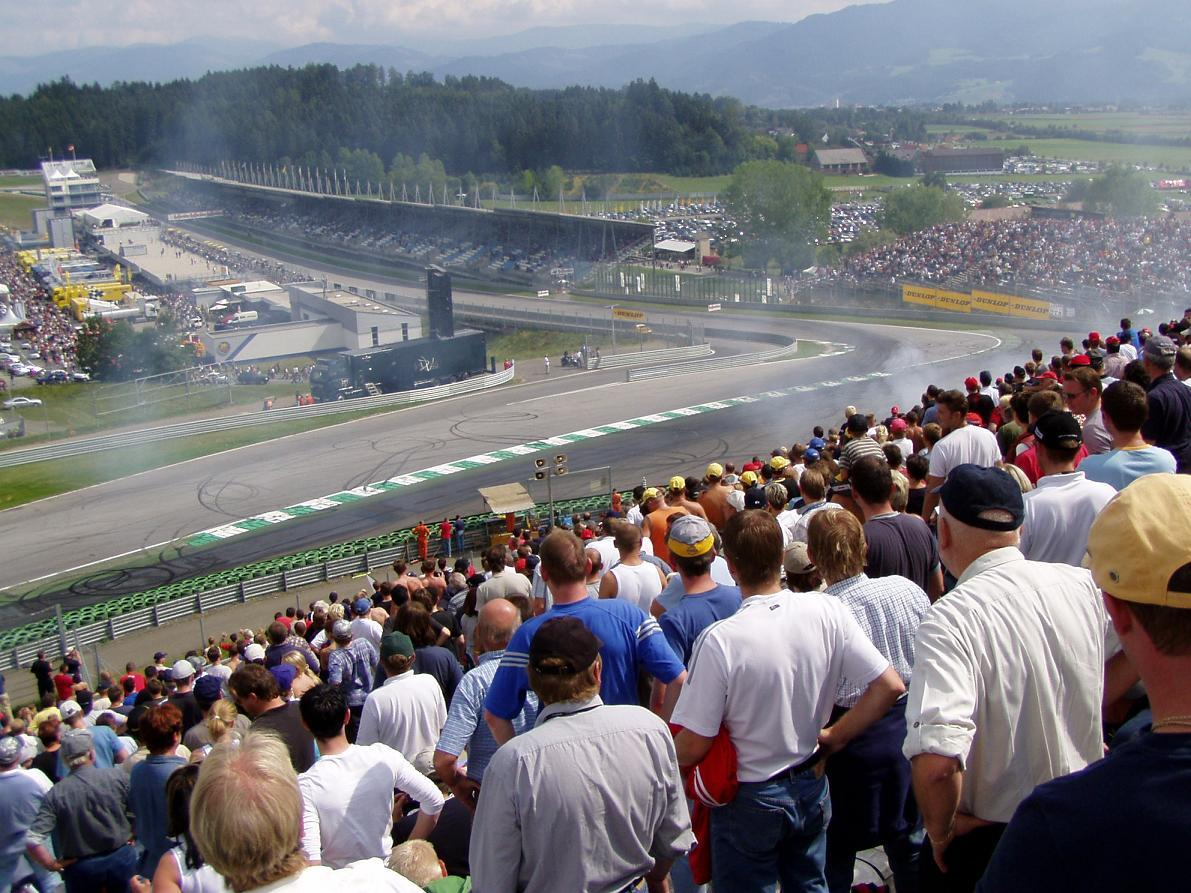
Special events are commonly held before the Grand Prix.

In 1995 and 1996, the Österreichring was refurbished and brought up to date, which allowed the race to run again in 1997. Since the track, which was renamed A1-Ring after a sponsor, is located on the municipal territory of Spielberg, Spielberg was now given as the site of the Grand Prix. The whole layout was redesigned by Hermann Tilke, and the track lost all of its long, sweeping corners, aside from the Texaco Bends (which were made shorter and slower) and the Hella-Licht chicane, Flatschach, Dr. Tiroch curve and the first half of the backstretch run up to where the Bosch-Kurve was taken out and replaced with a bypass that went directly to the second half of the fast, uphill backstretch. The 2002 event received negative publicity after Ferrari instructed Rubens Barrichello to cede his victory to Michael Schumacher. It was a mainstay on the calendar until hosting its final race in 2003.

=== Red Bull Ring ===
In July 2013, it was reported that the circuit's new owners Red Bull GmbH had reached an agreement with Bernie Ecclestone to revive the Austrian Grand Prix after a ten-year absence from the calendar. The race was given a provisional date of July 2014. On 6 December, the officially released calendar included the Austrian Grand Prix on it. Formula One is set to race at the venue until 2041.

== Winners ==
=== By year ===
The Österreichring with the chicane, used from 1977 to 1987

The original Österreichring, used from 1969 to 1976

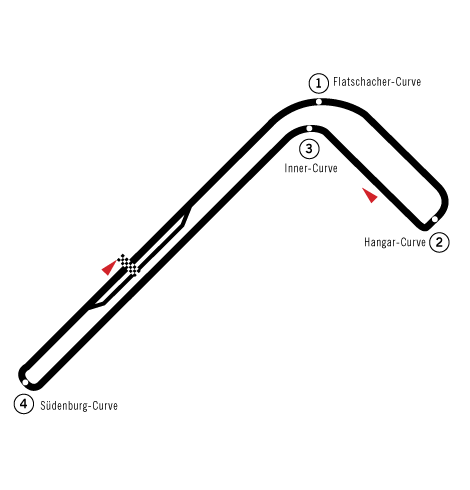
Zeltweg Airfield, used from 1963 until 1968

A pink background indicates an event which was not part of the Formula One World Championship.

Year	Driver	Constructor	Location	Report
1963	(Australia) Jack Brabham	Brabham-Climax	Zeltweg Airfield	Report
1964	(Italy) Lorenzo Bandini	Ferrari	Zeltweg Airfield	Report
1965	(Austria) Jochen Rindt	Ferrari	Zeltweg Airfield	Report
1966	(West Germany) Gerhard Mitter (West Germany) Hans Herrmann	Porsche	Zeltweg Airfield	Report
1967	(Australia) Paul Hawkins	Ford	Zeltweg Airfield	Report
1968	(Switzerland) Jo Siffert	Porsche	Zeltweg Airfield	Report
1969	(Switzerland) Jo Siffert (West Germany) Kurt Ahrens Jr.	Porsche	Österreichring	Report
1970	(Belgium) Jacky Ickx	Ferrari	Österreichring	Report
1971	(Switzerland) Jo Siffert	BRM	Österreichring	Report
1972	(Brazil) Emerson Fittipaldi	Lotus-Ford	Österreichring	Report
1973	(Sweden) Ronnie Peterson	Lotus-Ford	Österreichring	Report
1974	(Argentina) Carlos Reutemann	Brabham-Ford	Österreichring	Report
1975	(Italy) Vittorio Brambilla	March-Ford	Österreichring	Report
1976	(United Kingdom) John Watson	Penske-Ford	Österreichring	Report
1977	(Australia) Alan Jones	Shadow-Ford	Österreichring	Report
1978	(Sweden) Ronnie Peterson	Lotus-Ford	Österreichring	Report
1979	(Australia) Alan Jones	Williams-Ford	Österreichring	Report
1980	(France) Jean-Pierre Jabouille	Renault	Österreichring	Report
1981	(France) Jacques Laffite	Ligier-Matra	Österreichring	Report
1982	(Italy) Elio de Angelis	Lotus-Ford	Österreichring	Report
1983	(France) Alain Prost	Renault	Österreichring	Report
1984	(Austria) Niki Lauda	McLaren-TAG	Österreichring	Report
1985	(France) Alain Prost	McLaren-TAG	Österreichring	Report
1986	(France) Alain Prost	McLaren-TAG	Österreichring	Report
1987	(United Kingdom) Nigel Mansell	Williams-Honda	Österreichring	Report
1988 – 1996	Not held due to safety concerns with the Österreichring			
1997	(Canada) Jacques Villeneuve	Williams-Renault	A1-Ring	Report
1998	(Finland) Mika Häkkinen	McLaren-Mercedes	A1-Ring	Report
1999	(United Kingdom) Eddie Irvine	Ferrari	A1-Ring	Report
2000	(Finland) Mika Häkkinen	McLaren-Mercedes	A1-Ring	Report
2001	(United Kingdom) David Coulthard	McLaren-Mercedes	A1-Ring	Report
2002	(Germany) Michael Schumacher	Ferrari	A1-Ring	Report
2003	(Germany) Michael Schumacher	Ferrari	A1-Ring	Report
2004 – 2013	Not held			
2014	(Germany) Nico Rosberg	Mercedes	Red Bull Ring	Report
2015	(Germany) Nico Rosberg	Mercedes	Red Bull Ring	Report
2016	(United Kingdom) Lewis Hamilton	Mercedes	Red Bull Ring	Report
2017	(Finland) Valtteri Bottas	Mercedes	Red Bull Ring	Report
2018	(Netherlands) Max Verstappen	Red Bull Racing-TAG Heuer	Red Bull Ring	Report
2019	(Netherlands) Max Verstappen	Red Bull Racing-Honda	Red Bull Ring	Report
2020	(Finland) Valtteri Bottas	Mercedes	Red Bull Ring	Report
2021	(Netherlands) Max Verstappen	Red Bull Racing-Honda	Red Bull Ring	Report
2022	(Monaco) Charles Leclerc	Ferrari	Red Bull Ring	Report
2023	(Netherlands) Max Verstappen	Red Bull Racing-Honda RBPT	Red Bull Ring	Report
2024	(United Kingdom) George Russell	Mercedes	Red Bull Ring	Report
2025	(United Kingdom) Lando Norris	McLaren-Mercedes	Red Bull Ring	Report
2026	(United Kingdom) George Russell	Mercedes	Red Bull Ring	Report

=== Repeat winners (drivers) ===
Drivers in bold are competing in the Formula One championship in 2026.
A pink background indicates an event which was not part of the Formula One World Championship.

Wins	Driver	Years won
4	(Netherlands) **Max Verstappen**	2018, 2019, 2021, 2023
3	(Switzerland) Jo Siffert	1968, 1969*, 1971
3	(France) Alain Prost	1983, 1985, 1986
2	(Sweden) Ronnie Peterson	1973, 1978
2	(Australia) Alan Jones	1977, 1979
2	(Finland) Mika Häkkinen	1998, 2000
2	(Germany) Michael Schumacher	2002, 2003
2	(Germany) Nico Rosberg	2014, 2015
2	(Finland) **Valtteri Bottas**	2017, 2020
2	(United Kingdom) **George Russell**	2024, 2026

* Shared win with Kurt Ahrens Jr.

=== Repeat winners (constructors) ===
Teams in bold are competing in the Formula One championship in 2026.
A pink background indicates an event which was not part of the Formula One World Championship.

Wins	Constructor	Years won
7	(Italy) **Ferrari**	1964, 1965, 1970, 1999, 2002, 2003, 2022
7	(United Kingdom) **McLaren**	1984, 1985, 1986, 1998, 2000, 2001, 2025
7	(Germany) **Mercedes**	2014, 2015, 2016, 2017, 2020, 2024, 2026
4	(United Kingdom) Lotus	1972, 1973, 1978, 1982
4	(Austria) **Red Bull**	2018, 2019, 2021, 2023
3	(Germany) Porsche	1966, 1968, 1969
3	(United Kingdom) **Williams**	1979, 1987, 1997
2	(United Kingdom) Brabham	1963, 1974
2	(France) Renault	1980, 1983

=== Repeat winners (engine manufacturers) ===
Manufacturers in bold are competing in the Formula One championship in 2026.
A pink background indicates an event which was not part of the Formula One World Championship.

Wins	Manufacturer	Years won
11	(Germany) **Mercedes** **	1998, 2000, 2001, 2014, 2015, 2016, 2017, 2020, 2024, 2025, 2026
10	(United States) Ford *	1967, 1972, 1973, 1974, 1975, 1976, 1977, 1978, 1979, 1982
7	(Italy) **Ferrari**	1964, 1965, 1970, 1999, 2002, 2003, 2022
3	(Germany) Porsche	1966, 1968, 1969
3	(Luxembourg) TAG ***	1984, 1985, 1986
3	(France) Renault	1980, 1983, 1997
3	(Japan) **Honda**	1987, 2019, 2021

* Built by Cosworth, funded by Ford (except 1967)

** Between 1998 and 2001 built by Ilmor, funded by Mercedes

*** Built by Porsche

== See also ==
- Styrian Grand Prix, also held in Austria
