= 2023 Austrian Grand Prix =

Formula One motor race

Race 9 of 22 in the 2023 Formula One World Championship
← Previous race	Next race →
- Layout of the Red Bull Ring

Race details
- Date: 2 July 2023
- Official name: Formula 1 Rolex Großer Preis von Österreich 2023
- Location: Red Bull Ring; Spielberg, Styria, Austria
- Course: Permanent racing facility
- Course length: 4.318 km (2.683 miles)
- Distance: 71 laps, 306.452 km (190.420 miles)
- Weather: Cloudy
- Attendance: 304,000

Pole position
Driver	(Netherlands) Max Verstappen	Red Bull Racing-Honda RBPT
- Time: 1:04.391

Fastest lap
Driver	(Netherlands) Max Verstappen	Red Bull Racing-Honda RBPT
- Time: 1:07.012 on lap 71

Podium
First	(Netherlands) Max Verstappen	Red Bull Racing-Honda RBPT
Second	(Monaco) Charles Leclerc	Ferrari
Third	(Mexico) Sergio Pérez	Red Bull Racing-Honda RBPT

The 2023 Austrian Grand Prix (officially known as the Formula 1 Rolex Großer Preis von Österreich 2023) was a Formula One motor race, which was held on 2 July 2023 at the Red Bull Ring in Spielberg, Austria. It was the ninth round of the 2023 Formula One World Championship and the second Grand Prix weekend of the 2023 season to utilise the sprint format.

Both races were won by Red Bull Racing's Max Verstappen, who started on pole position for both. The weekend saw numerous penalties be given to drivers for track limits violations.

== Background ==
The event was held across the weekend of 30 June – 2 July. It was the ninth round of the 2023 Formula One World Championship, and the 36th running of the Austrian Grand Prix in a World Championship season. The weekend was the second of six in the season to follow the sprint format.

McLaren worked to bring improvements to the MCL60, which had shown underwhelming performance in earlier races. Prior to this Grand Prix, Lando Norris' highest finish of the season was a sixth-place finish in the Australian Grand Prix earlier in the year. McLaren was able to prepare half an upgrade package which would be fitted into Norris' car, specifically the sidepods, bodywork, and floor. Teammate Oscar Piastri would receive it at the next race at the British Grand Prix.

=== Regulation change about tyre usage for sprint shootouts ===
The tyre rules for sprint shootout were modified, enabling drivers and teams who made it through to SQ3 (the third segment of sprint shooutout) to use any set of soft tyre, whereas they were previously required to use new soft tyres. The change was made after Lando Norris could not run in SQ3 at the Azerbaijan Grand Prix, due to him exhausting his allocation of soft tyres. (Note: Theoretically, Lando Norris could have run intermediate or full wet tyres during the dry SQ3 session.)

=== Championship standings before the race ===
Coming into the weekend, Max Verstappen led the Drivers' Championship by 69 points from teammate Sergio Pérez, with Fernando Alonso third, a further 9 points behind. Red Bull Racing led the Constructors' Championship, leading Mercedes by 154 points and Aston Martin by 167 points.

=== Entrants ===
The drivers and teams were the same as the season entry list with no additional stand-in drivers for the race.

=== Tyre choices ===
Tyre supplier Pirelli brought the C3, C4 and C5 tyre compounds (designated hard, medium, and soft, respectively) for teams to use at the event.

== Practice ==
The single free practice session was held on 30 June 2023, at 13:30 local time (UTC+2). Max Verstappen topped the session, followed by the two Ferrari drivers Carlos Sainz Jr. and Charles Leclerc.

== Qualifying ==
Qualifying was held on 30 June 2023 at 17:00 local time (UTC+2) and determined the starting order for the main race.

=== Qualifying report ===
The first session (Q1) was red-flagged when Valtteri Bottas spun out at turn one; by this point, Max Verstappen topped the session, with Kevin Magnussen second; the former had his best lap time deleted due to a track limits violation; in addition, Pierre Gasly, Zhou Guanyu and Lewis Hamilton all committed track limits violations. Verstappen set the fastest time as Yuki Tsunoda, teammate Nyck de Vries, Zhou, Logan Sargeant, and Magnussen were all eliminated following Q1.

As Verstappen started his Q2 (the second segment) lap, he exceeded track limits at turn ten and had his lap time deleted. This allowed Lando Norris to momentarily top the session ahead of Nico Hülkenberg, Fernando Alonso, Carlos Sainz Jr. and Hamilton. Sergio Pérez committed more track limits violations, denying him a spot in Q3, (the third session) for the fourth consecutive time, as all his lap times in Q2 were deleted for track limits violations. He joined George Russell, Esteban Ocon, Oscar Piastri and Bottas in being eliminated.

Due to this, Alexander Albon appeared in Q3 for the Williams team, going on to qualify tenth. Verstappen took pole, with Charles Leclerc and Sainz making it two Ferraris in the top 3. Lance Stroll in sixth outqualified teammate Alonso in seventh.

=== Qualifying classification ===
Pos.	No.	Driver	Constructor	Qualifying times			Final grid
Pos.	No.	Driver	Constructor	Q1	Q2	Q3	Final grid
1	1	(Netherlands) Max Verstappen	Red Bull Racing-Honda RBPT	1:05.116	1:04.951	1:04.391	1
2	16	(Monaco) Charles Leclerc	Ferrari	1:05.577	1:05.087	1:04.439	2
3	55	(Spain) Carlos Sainz Jr.	Ferrari	1:05.339	1:04.975	1:04.581	3
4	4	(United Kingdom) Lando Norris	McLaren-Mercedes	1:05.617	1:05.038	1:04.658	4
5	44	(United Kingdom) Lewis Hamilton	Mercedes	1:05.673	1:05.188	1:04.819	5
6	18	(Canada) Lance Stroll	Aston Martin Aramco-Mercedes	1:05.710	1:05.121	1:04.893	6
7	14	(Spain) Fernando Alonso	Aston Martin Aramco-Mercedes	1:05.655	1:05.181	1:04.911	7
8	27	(Germany) Nico Hülkenberg	Haas-Ferrari	1:05.740	1:05.362	1:05.090	8
9	10	(France) Pierre Gasly	Alpine-Renault	1:05.515	1:05.308	1:05.170	9
10	23	(Thailand) Alexander Albon	Williams-Mercedes	1:05.673	1:05.387	1:05.823	10
11	63	(United Kingdom) George Russell	Mercedes	1:05.686	1:05.428	N/A	11
12	31	(France) Esteban Ocon	Alpine-Renault	1:05.729	1:05.453	N/A	12
13	81	(Australia) Oscar Piastri	McLaren-Mercedes	1:05.683	1:05.605	N/A	13
14	77	(Finland) Valtteri Bottas	Alfa Romeo-Ferrari	1:05.763	1:05.680	N/A	14
15	11	(Mexico) Sergio Pérez	Red Bull Racing-Honda RBPT	1:05.177	2:06.688	N/A	15
16	22	(Japan) Yuki Tsunoda	AlphaTauri-Honda RBPT	1:05.784	N/A	N/A	16
17	24	(China) Zhou Guanyu	Alfa Romeo-Ferrari	1:05.818	N/A	N/A	17
18	2	(United States) Logan Sargeant	Williams-Mercedes	1:05.948	N/A	N/A	18
19	20	(Denmark) Kevin Magnussen	Haas-Ferrari	1:05.971	N/A	N/A	PL^{a}
20	21	(Netherlands) Nyck de Vries	AlphaTauri-Honda RBPT	1:05.974	N/A	N/A	PL^{b}
107% time: 1:09.674

Notes

- ^a – Kevin Magnussen qualified 19th, but he was required to start the race from the pit lane as the setup of the suspension was changed while the car was under parc fermé.
- ^b – Nyck de Vries qualified 20th, but he was required to start the race from the pit lane due to changes to the setup of the suspension and to the rear and beam wings while the car was under parc fermé.

== Sprint shootout ==
The sprint shootout was held on 1 July 2023 at 12:00 local time (UTC+2) and determined the starting order for the Sprint race.

=== Sprint shootout report ===
The first session began after a patch of rain around the Red Bull Ring earlier in the morning; as such, the track was cloudy, with no rain forecast over the first 20 minutes of sprint shootout. The track, however, remained wet, so drivers were able to run any compound; Kevin Magnussen and Max Verstappen put on the mediums. The Williams cars of Alexander Albon and Logan Sargeant put on the intermediate tyres. All other cars were on softs. Both Williams cars would later swap for softs. Zhou Guanyu spun and caused a brief yellow flag.

Carlos Sainz Jr. suffered a failure of his brake-by-wire system, going into the pit lane with smoke billowing from the back of his Ferrari SF-23. Due to this, he was unable to set a lap time for the majority of the first part until his car was repaired during the closing minutes of the session. His only lap of the session ended up topping the timing sheets for the first session after Lewis Hamilton's time was deleted for track limits violations.

Verstappen, Zhou, Sergio Pérez, Hamilton (who initially topped the session), and Sargeant's first times were deleted for track limits violations. Oscar Piastri was blocked by Charles Leclerc, as the latter went back to the pits. The stewards investigated the incident as Leclerc made it through the next session by 0.1 millisecond. Zhou, Piastri, Hamilton, Valtteri Bottas and Sargeant were all knocked out and the end of the first part. This is the first time Hamilton got knocked following the first segment of a qualification session since the 2022 Saudi Arabian Grand Prix. Hamilton's teammate George Russell, having set a time for seventh, reported a hydraulics failure, ruling him out of the rest of qualification. Nico Hülkenberg was the third-fastest behind the Aston Martins of Lance Stroll and Fernando Alonso.

In the second session, De Vries and Verstappen had their lap times deleted due to track limits violations, and a replay showed Hülkenberg's car running over a tyre; stewards investigated the unsafe release, although no penalty was awarded. Albon, Pierre Gasly, and the AlphaTauris of Yuki Tsunoda and De Vries joined Russell all out of the session.

Verstappen took the pole position for the sprint, with Pérez allowing the Red Bulls to start 1–2 with the Ferraris fifth (Sainz) and sixth (Leclerc, who was penalised and dropped to ninth after he impeded Piastri earlier). Norris was in third and Hülkenberg fourth as Alonso and Stroll were classified seventh and eighth respectively.

=== Sprint shootout classification ===
Pos.	No.	Driver	Constructor	Qualifying times			Sprint grid
Pos.	No.	Driver	Constructor	SQ1	SQ2	SQ3	Sprint grid
1	1	(Netherlands) Max Verstappen	Red Bull Racing-Honda RBPT	1:06.236	1:05.371	1:04.440	1
2	11	(Mexico) Sergio Pérez	Red Bull Racing-Honda RBPT	1:06.924	1:05.836	1:04.933	2
3	4	(United Kingdom) Lando Norris	McLaren-Mercedes	1:06.723	1:05.699	1:05.010	3
4	27	(Germany) Nico Hülkenberg	Haas-Ferrari	1:06.548	1:06.091	1:05.084	4
5	55	(Spain) Carlos Sainz Jr.	Ferrari	1:06.187	1:05.434	1:05.136	5
6	16	(Monaco) Charles Leclerc	Ferrari	1:07.061	1:05.673	1:05.245	9^{1}
7	14	(Spain) Fernando Alonso	Aston Martin Aramco-Mercedes	1:06.611	1:05.759	1:05.258	6
8	18	(Canada) Lance Stroll	Aston Martin Aramco-Mercedes	1:06.569	1:05.914	1:05.347	7
9	31	(France) Esteban Ocon	Alpine-Renault	1:06.840	1:05.604	1:05.366	8
10	20	(Denmark) Kevin Magnussen	Haas-Ferrari	1:06.629	1:05.730	1:05.912	10
11	23	(Thailand) Alexander Albon	Williams-Mercedes	1:06.892	1:06.152	N/A	11
12	10	(France) Pierre Gasly	Alpine-Renault	1:06.873	1:06.360	N/A	12
13	22	(Japan) Yuki Tsunoda	AlphaTauri-Honda RBPT	1:06.896	1:06.369	N/A	13
14	21	(Netherlands) Nyck de Vries	AlphaTauri-Honda RBPT	1:06.704	1:06.593	N/A	14
15	63	(United Kingdom) George Russell	Mercedes	1:06.653	No time	N/A	15
16	24	(China) Zhou Guanyu	Alfa Romeo-Ferrari	1:07.062	N/A	N/A	16
17	81	(Australia) Oscar Piastri	McLaren-Mercedes	1:07.106	N/A	N/A	17
18	44	(United Kingdom) Lewis Hamilton	Mercedes	1:07.282	N/A	N/A	18
19	77	(Finland) Valtteri Bottas	Alfa Romeo-Ferrari	1:07.291	N/A	N/A	19
20	2	(United States) Logan Sargeant	Williams-Mercedes	1:07.426	N/A	N/A	20
107% time: 1:10.820^{2}

Notes

- ^1 – Charles Leclerc received a three-place grid penalty for impeding Oscar Piastri in SQ1.
- ^2 – As the sprint shootout was held on a wet track, the 107% rule was not in force.

== Sprint ==
The sprint was held on 1 July 2023 at 16:30 local time (UTC+2).

=== Sprint report ===
The sprint started in damp conditions, with all cars starting on the intermediate-wet tyres. Sergio Pérez had two near-miss moments between him and teammate Max Verstappen, leading to Pérez running wide at turn 3 on lap 1, losing positions to Hülkenberg and Sainz, and asking about Verstappen’s actions over team radio. Verstappen would remain the leading car for the rest of the sprint.

Nico Hülkenberg ran as high as second place before Pérez passed him, with Carlos Sainz Jr. and Lance Stroll passing Hülkenberg soon after. Hülkenberg, Lewis Hamilton, Kevin Magnussen, Logan Sargeant, Nyck de Vries, and Zhou Guanyu all boxed for dry tyres. The sprint ended with Verstappen winning from Pérez as Esteban Ocon and George Russell had a battle going into the final corner, with the former edging out the latter by 0.009 seconds for 7th place.

=== Sprint classification ===
Pos.	No.	Driver	Constructor	Laps	Time/Retired	Grid	Points
1	1	(Netherlands) Max Verstappen	Red Bull Racing-Honda RBPT	24	30:26.730	1	8
2	11	(Mexico) Sergio Pérez	Red Bull Racing-Honda RBPT	24	+21.048	2	7
3	55	(Spain) Carlos Sainz Jr.	Ferrari	24	+23.088	5	6
4	18	(Canada) Lance Stroll	Aston Martin Aramco-Mercedes	24	+29.703	7	5
5	14	(Spain) Fernando Alonso	Aston Martin Aramco-Mercedes	24	+30.109	6	4
6	27	(Germany) Nico Hülkenberg	Haas-Ferrari	24	+31.297	4	3
7	31	(France) Esteban Ocon	Alpine-Renault	24	+36.602	8	2
8	63	(United Kingdom) George Russell	Mercedes	24	+36.611	15	1
9	4	(United Kingdom) Lando Norris	McLaren-Mercedes	24	+38.608	3	
10	44	(United Kingdom) Lewis Hamilton	Mercedes	24	+46.375	18	
11	81	(Australia) Oscar Piastri	McLaren-Mercedes	24	+49.807	17	
12	16	(Monaco) Charles Leclerc	Ferrari	24	+50.789	9	
13	23	(Thailand) Alexander Albon	Williams-Mercedes	24	+52.848	11	
14	20	(Denmark) Kevin Magnussen	Haas-Ferrari	24	+56.593	10	
15	10	(France) Pierre Gasly	Alpine-Renault	24	+57.652	12	
16	22	(Japan) Yuki Tsunoda	AlphaTauri-Honda RBPT	24	+1:04.822	13	
17	21	(Netherlands) Nyck de Vries	AlphaTauri-Honda RBPT	24	+1:05.617	14	
18	2	(United States) Logan Sargeant	Williams-Mercedes	24	+1:06.059	20	
19	24	(China) Zhou Guanyu	Alfa Romeo-Ferrari	24	+1:10.825	16	
20	77	(Finland) Valtteri Bottas	Alfa Romeo-Ferrari	24	+1:16.435	PL^{1}	
Fastest lap: (Germany) Nico Hülkenberg (Haas-Ferrari) – 1:10.180 (lap 24)

Notes

- ^1 – Valtteri Bottas qualified 19th, but he started the race from the pit lane as he made a pit stop during the formation lap. His place on the grid was left vacant.

== Race ==
The race was held on 2 July 2023, at 15:00 local time (UTC+2).

=== Race report ===
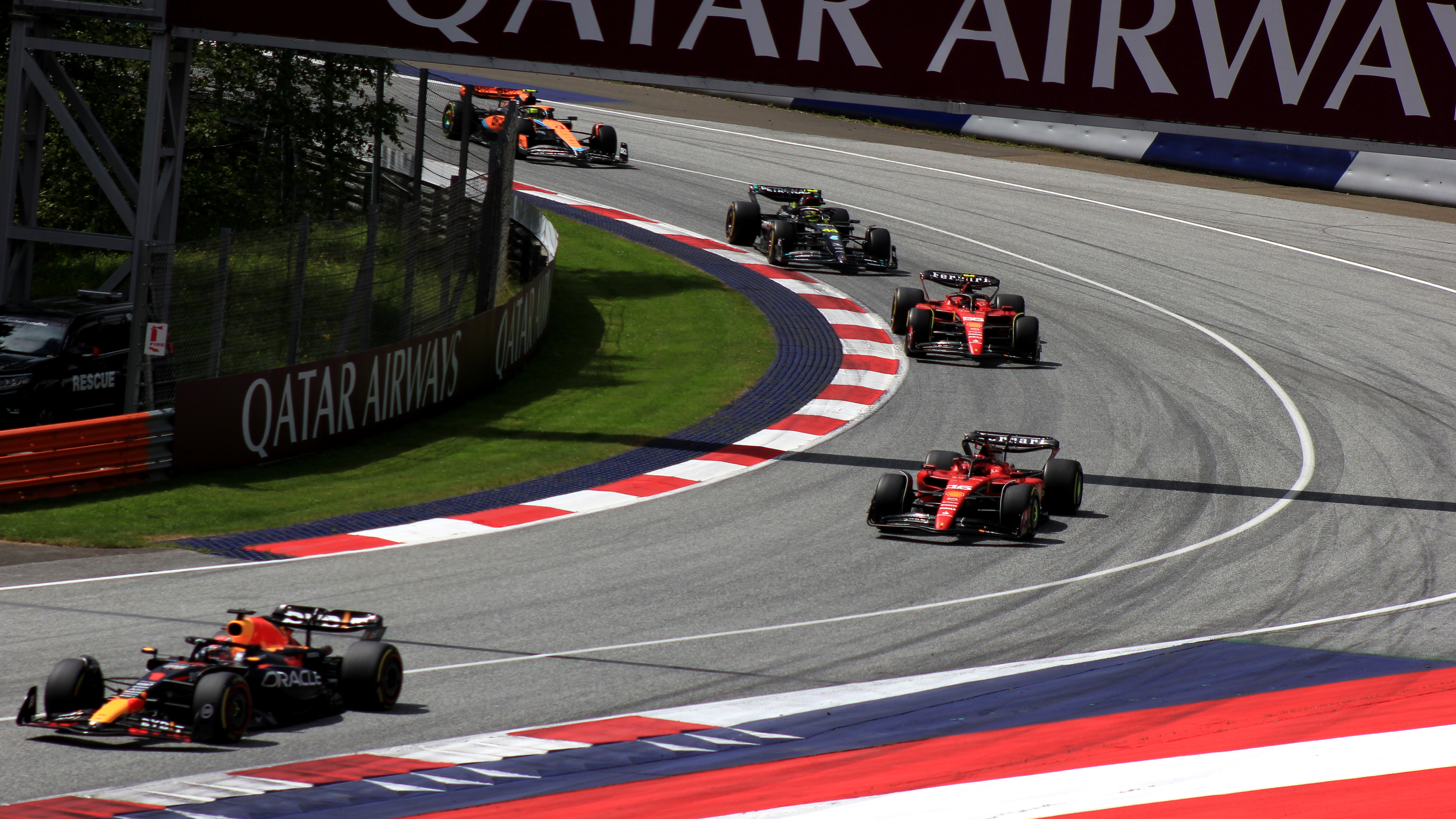
Winner Max Verstappen leads the Grand Prix, followed by Charles Leclerc, Carlos Sainz Jr., Lewis Hamilton, and Lando Norris.

The race was held under cloudy conditions. Max Verstappen had a good start ahead of the Ferraris with Lewis Hamilton battling Lando Norris for fourth. The safety car was called out after Yuki Tsunoda went into the gravel, damaging his front wing after a collision with Esteban Ocon. This incident did not result in a penalty for either driver and Tsunoda went into the pit lane to replace his wing. Meanwhile, Kevin Magnussen reported ERS problems and joined Tsunoda in the pit lane.

On the restart, Verstappen had another good start and built a gap away from Charles Leclerc as Sergio Pérez fought his way through the midfield, passing Ocon and closing up to George Russell, whom he eventually passed. Norris, who was behind Hamilton, reported numerous times that Hamilton had exceeded track limits. Hamilton, and later Tsunoda, would receive a black and white flag for unsportsmanlike conduct, later receiving penalties. Nico Hülkenberg's car started to smoke, retiring with a power unit issue and bringing out a virtual safety car. Carlos Sainz Jr., who was behind his teammate, requested to the team that Leclerc let him through to take the fight to Verstappen, though this went unanswered as the team decided to pit Sainz behind Leclerc getting a slower stop, dropping him behind Hamilton and Norris, who had exited the pits.

Verstappen would continue to build a large gap until he went into the pit lane for his stop. Leclerc jumped him in the pit lane, allowing him to lead a race for Ferrari for the first time since the Azerbaijan Grand Prix. This time, he kept the lead for nine laps, culminating in a battle between him and Verstappen that he had no answer to as the Red Bull driver passed him with DRS. Pérez, who had started fifteenth, would get up to third as drivers made their stops, and Verstappen, having built up a large gap over the race, won comfortably in front of Leclerc who gave Ferrari their 800th Formula One podium. Verstappen's teammate Pérez completed the podium in third. Verstappen took the fastest lap bonus point.

A large number of penalties would be given out during the race, with a majority being due to track limits violations around the final two corners; the first two drivers to receive them were Hamilton and Tsunoda, both receiving five-second penalties for exceeding track limits. Tsunoda would later receive a ten-second penalty for further track-limit violations in addition to an investigation for not serving his first penalty correctly (which was resolved in his favour). Additionally, Sainz, Alexander Albon, Pierre Gasly, Logan Sargeant, and Magnussen all received penalties for track limits. The only two drivers to have been penalised for something other than track limits were Esteban Ocon for unsafe release during his pit-stop, and Nyck de Vries for pushing Magnussen off-track. Further penalties for exceeding track limits would be given after Aston Martin protested the race results, with Ocon receiving a thirty-second penalty overall, in addition to a 5-second penalty for a different violation which he received during the race.

=== Post-race ===
Aston Martin successfully protested the race results. The stewards were unable to review all 1,200 reports during the race, but handed out a further twelve penalties for track limits violations following completion of the review process afterwards.

=== Race classification ===
Pos.	No.	Driver	Constructor	Laps	Time/Retired	Grid	Points
1	1	(Netherlands) Max Verstappen	Red Bull Racing-Honda RBPT	71	1:25:33.607	1	26^{1}
2	16	(Monaco) Charles Leclerc	Ferrari	71	+5.155	2	18
3	11	(Mexico) Sergio Pérez	Red Bull Racing-Honda RBPT	71	+17.188	15	15
4	4	(United Kingdom) Lando Norris	McLaren-Mercedes	71	+26.327	4	12
5	14	(Spain) Fernando Alonso	Aston Martin Aramco-Mercedes	71	+30.317	7	10
6	55	(Spain) Carlos Sainz Jr.	Ferrari	71	+31.377^{2}	3	8
7	63	(United Kingdom) George Russell	Mercedes	71	+48.403	11	6
8	44	(United Kingdom) Lewis Hamilton	Mercedes	71	+49.196^{3}	5	4
9	18	(Canada) Lance Stroll	Aston Martin Aramco-Mercedes	71	+59.043	6	2
10	10	(France) Pierre Gasly	Alpine-Renault	71	+1:07.667^{4}	9	1
11	23	(Thailand) Alexander Albon	Williams-Mercedes	71	+1:19.767^{5}	10	
12	24	(China) Zhou Guanyu	Alfa Romeo-Ferrari	70	+1 lap	17	
13	2	(United States) Logan Sargeant	Williams-Mercedes	70	+1 lap^{6}	18	
14	31	(France) Esteban Ocon	Alpine-Renault	70	+1 lap^{7}	12	
15	77	(Finland) Valtteri Bottas	Alfa Romeo-Ferrari	70	+1 lap	14	
16	81	(Australia) Oscar Piastri	McLaren-Mercedes	70	+1 lap	13	
17	21	(Netherlands) Nyck de Vries	AlphaTauri-Honda RBPT	70	+1 lap^{8}	PL	
18	20	(Denmark) Kevin Magnussen	Haas-Ferrari	70	+1 lap^{9}	PL	
19	22	(Japan) Yuki Tsunoda	AlphaTauri-Honda RBPT	70	+1 lap^{10}	16	
Ret	27	(Germany) Nico Hülkenberg	Haas-Ferrari	12	Engine	8	
Fastest lap: (Netherlands) Max Verstappen (Red Bull Racing-Honda RBPT) – 1:07.012 (lap 71)

Notes

- ^1 – Includes one point for fastest lap.
- ^2 – Carlos Sainz Jr. finished fourth, but he received a ten-second time penalty for exceeding track limits.
- ^3 – Lewis Hamilton finished seventh, but he received a ten-second time penalty for exceeding track limits.
- ^4 – Pierre Gasly finished ninth, but he received a ten-second time penalty for exceeding track limits.
- ^5 – Alexander Albon received a ten-second time penalty for exceeding track limits. His final position was not affected by the penalty.
- ^6 – Logan Sargeant received a total of 15-second time penalty for exceeding track limits. His final position was not affected by the penalty.
- ^7 – Esteban Ocon finished 12th, but he received a total of 30-second time penalty for exceeding track limits.
- ^8 – Nyck de Vries finished 15th, but he received a five-second time penalty for forcing Kevin Magnussen off the track. He also received a total of 15-second time penalty for exceeding track limits.
- ^9 – Kevin Magnussen finished 19th, but he received a five-second time penalty for exceeding track limits. He gained a position following Yuki Tsunoda's penalty.
- ^10 – Yuki Tsunoda finished 17th, but he received a total of 15-second time penalty for exceeding track limits.

== Championship standings after the race ==
Drivers' Championship standings

Pos.	Driver	Points
1	(Netherlands) Max Verstappen	229
2	(Mexico) Sergio Pérez	148
3	(Spain) Fernando Alonso	131
4	(United Kingdom) Lewis Hamilton	106
5	(Spain) Carlos Sainz Jr.	82

Constructors' Championship standings

Pos.	Constructor	Points
1	(Austria) Red Bull Racing-Honda RBPT	377
2	(Germany) Mercedes	178
3	(United Kingdom) Aston Martin Aramco-Mercedes	175
4	(Italy) Ferrari	154
5	(France) Alpine-Renault	47

- Note: Only the top five positions are included for both sets of standings.

== See also ==
- 2023 Spielberg Formula 2 round
- 2023 Spielberg Formula 3 round

== Notes ==
Previous race: 2023 Canadian Grand Prix	FIA Formula One World Championship; 2023 season	Next race: 2023 British Grand Prix
Previous race: 2022 Austrian Grand Prix	Austrian Grand Prix	Next race: 2024 Austrian Grand Prix
