= 2022 Austrian Grand Prix =

Eleventh round of the 2022 F1 season

Race 11 of 22 in the 2022 Formula One World Championship
← Previous race	Next race →
- Layout of the Red Bull Ring

Race details
- Date: 10 July 2022
- Official name: Formula 1 Rolex Großer Preis von Österreich 2022
- Location: Red Bull Ring; Spielberg, Styria, Austria
- Course: Permanent racing facility
- Course length: 4.318 km (2.683 miles)
- Distance: 71 laps, 306.452 km (190.420 miles)
- Weather: Partly cloudy
- Attendance: 303,000

Pole position
Driver	(Netherlands) Max Verstappen (Note: Max Verstappen was credited with pole position after qualifying. He also started the race in the first position after winning the sprint.)	Red Bull Racing-RBPT
- Time: 1:04.984
- Grid positions set by results of sprint

Fastest lap
Driver	(Netherlands) Max Verstappen	Red Bull Racing-RBPT
- Time: 1:07.275 on lap 62

Podium
First	(Monaco) Charles Leclerc	Ferrari
Second	(Netherlands) Max Verstappen	Red Bull Racing-RBPT
Third	(United Kingdom) Lewis Hamilton	Mercedes

The 2022 Austrian Grand Prix (officially known as the Formula 1 Rolex Großer Preis von Österreich 2022) was a Formula One motor race held on 10 July 2022 at the Red Bull Ring in Spielberg, Austria. It was the second Grand Prix weekend of the 2022 season to utilise the Formula One sprint format.

Max Verstappen qualified on pole position and retained the first grid spot by winning the sprint. Charles Leclerc won the race in spite of late issues with his car, retaking second place in the standings from Sergio Pérez. This race marked Ferrari's first win in Austria since Michael Schumacher won there for the team in 2003 and Leclerc's first win in his career without starting from pole. Verstappen finished second, and Lewis Hamilton came in third. This race marked Leclerc's third and final win of the 2022 season, his last until the 2024 Monaco Grand Prix and Ferrari's last win until the 2023 Singapore Grand Prix. The entire race weekend was marred by accusations of poor fan behavior.

Following the result, Leclerc overtook Pérez to take second in the World Drivers' Championship with 170 points following the latter's retirement, but championship leader Verstappen managed to increase the gap to 38 points. In the World Constructors' Championship, the top five teams remained unchanged, with Red Bull maintaining the lead, but Ferrari in second place narrowed the gap to Red Bull to 56 points.

== Background ==
The event was held across the weekend of the 8–10 July. It was the eleventh round of the 2022 Formula One World Championship, and the 35th running of the Austrian Grand Prix in a World Championship season.

=== Championship standings before the race ===
Max Verstappen led the Drivers' Championship by 34 points from teammate Sergio Pérez, with Charles Leclerc third, a further 9 points behind. Red Bull Racing led the Constructors' Championship, leading Ferrari by 63 points and Mercedes by 124 points.

=== Entrants ===
The drivers and teams were the same as the season entry list with no additional stand-in drivers for the race.

=== Tyre choices ===
Tyre supplier Pirelli brought the C3, C4, and C5 tyre compounds (designated hard, medium, and soft, respectively) for teams to use at the event.

=== Fan harassment allegations ===
During the event, some spectators accused other fans of harassment. Formula 1 teams and drivers have moved to condemn such behaviour with lifetime bans from attending F1 races in the future thought to be a possible punishment for offenders. The reported harassment received condemnation from many drivers, including Lewis Hamilton, Sebastian Vettel, and Max Verstappen. Hamilton called the abuse "disgusting" while Verstappen stated the harassment was "shocking" and should never happen. Vettel has called Formula One to ban spectators who harass other fans from attending races for life.

== Practice ==
There were two practice sessions, each lasted one hour. The first practice session took place on 8 July 2022, 13:30 local time (UTC+02:00). The second session took place on 9 July, at 12:30 local time.

== Qualifying ==
Qualifying took place on 8 July and determined the starting order for the sprint.

The first part of qualifying (Q1) saw the bottom five drivers eliminated from the rest of the session. Sebastian Vettel had his last lap time deleted, dropping him from 17th down to 20th. Daniel Ricciardo, Lance Stroll, Zhou Guanyu, Nicholas Latifi and Vettel were eliminated.

The second part of qualifying (Q2) saw the bottom five drivers eliminated from the rest of the session. Lando Norris ran wide in every attempt and did not set a representative lap time. He later explained his car was suffering from a brake problem. Pierre Gasly, Valtteri Bottas, Alexander Albon, Yuki Tsunoda and Norris were eliminated. Sergio Pérez ran wide on his last lap, with the FIA deleting his lap time after the session (as opposed to during the session, as was the practice for the other time deletions, since they failed to confirm their readings until after Q3 had already started). Despite setting times in Q3, he was reverted to his best legal Q2 lap time, demoting him to 13th.

The third part of qualifying (Q3) was a ten-car shoot-out for pole position. Lewis Hamilton spun on a fast lap, bounced across the gravel and hit the barrier. The red flag was waved and the session timer was paused as Hamilton's car was cleared. Once the session restarted, the second Mercedes of George Russell spun at turn 10 and hit the barrier, causing another red flag. Max Verstappen qualified first, with Charles Leclerc second and Carlos Sainz Jr. third. Pérez initially qualified fourth, but after his lap times were deleted, Russell was promoted into fourth and Esteban Ocon into fifth. This also meant that despite Pierre Gasly's elimination in Q2, he was promoted to tenth.

=== Post-qualifying ===
Following the qualifying session McLaren team manager Andreas Seidl admitted his team had not done a good job in qualifying after both Lando Norris and Daniel Ricciardo had their qualifying sessions affected by reliability problems. Seidl also stated that the team must also shoulder some of the blame for Ricciardo's difficulties in the season overall thus far. Mercedes boss Toto Wolff was unhappy when some fans cheered at Lewis Hamilton's crash and said the sport needed to "educate" fans on how to behave in such circumstances. Hamilton said he had no answer for what may have caused his Q3 crash and believed a top three finish in qualifying had been possible. Charles Leclerc stated after the session just wanted "a clean race" following his difficult run of results in the previous races. Christian Horner thought Sergio Pérez's punishment in regards to track limits were "very harsh," while Max Verstappen admitted he was on the edge with track limits himself in on his pole lap.

=== Qualifying classification ===
Pos.	No.	Driver	Constructor	Qualifying times			Sprint grid
Pos.	No.	Driver	Constructor	Q1	Q2	Q3	Sprint grid
1	1	(Netherlands) Max Verstappen	Red Bull Racing-RBPT	1:05.852	1:05.374	1:04.984	1
2	16	(Monaco) Charles Leclerc	Ferrari	1:05.419	1:05.287	1:05.013	2
3	55	(Spain) Carlos Sainz Jr.	Ferrari	1:05.660	1:05.576	1:05.066	3
4	63	(United Kingdom) George Russell	Mercedes	1:06.235	1:05.697	1:05.431	4
5	31	(France) Esteban Ocon	Alpine-Renault	1:06.468	1:05.993	1:05.726	5
6	20	(Denmark) Kevin Magnussen	Haas-Ferrari	1:06.366	1:05.894	1:05.879	6
7	47	(Germany) Mick Schumacher	Haas-Ferrari	1:06.405	1:06.151	1:06.011	7
8	14	(Spain) Fernando Alonso	Alpine-Renault	1:06.016	1:06.082	1:06.103	8
9	44	(United Kingdom) Lewis Hamilton	Mercedes	1:06.079	1:05.475	1:13.151	9
10	10	(France) Pierre Gasly	AlphaTauri-RBPT	1:06.589	1:06.160	N/A	10
11	23	(Thailand) Alexander Albon	Williams-Mercedes	1:06.516	1:06.230	N/A	11
12	77	(Finland) Valtteri Bottas	Alfa Romeo-Ferrari	1:06.442	1:06.319	N/A	12
13	11	(Mexico) Sergio Pérez	Red Bull Racing-RBPT	1:06.143	1:06.458	No time	13^{a}
14	22	(Japan) Yuki Tsunoda	AlphaTauri-RBPT	1:06.463	1:06.851	N/A	14
15	4	(United Kingdom) Lando Norris	McLaren-Mercedes	1:06.330	1:25.847	N/A	15
16	3	(Australia) Daniel Ricciardo	McLaren-Mercedes	1:06.613	N/A	N/A	16
17	18	(Canada) Lance Stroll	Aston Martin Aramco-Mercedes	1:06.847	N/A	N/A	17
18	24	(China) Zhou Guanyu	Alfa Romeo-Ferrari	1:06.901	N/A	N/A	18
19	6	(Canada) Nicholas Latifi	Williams-Mercedes	1:07.003	N/A	N/A	19
20	5	(Germany) Sebastian Vettel	Aston Martin Aramco-Mercedes	1:07.083	N/A	N/A	20
107% time: 1:09.998

Notes

- ^a – Sergio Pérez originally progressed to Q3 and qualified fourth, but his fastest Q2 lap time and all lap times in Q3 were deleted for exceeding track limits during Q2.

== Sprint ==
The sprint took place on 9 July, and was scheduled to run for 24 laps, though this was shortened by one lap due to an aborted start procedure resulting from a stopped car.

=== Formation lap ===
Fernando Alonso was left on the grid with his wheel blankets on before the formation lap. He was wheeled back into the pit lane, but due to an electrical issue, he did not start. Zhou Guanyu had an engine issue at the end of the formation lap, this meant another formation lap was required to move Zhou's car. He managed to restart his car, completed the second formation lap and was required to start from the pit lane. Mick Schumacher, Daniel Ricciardo, George Russell, Esteban Ocon, Sergio Pérez, Lance Stroll and Sebastian Vettel were summoned to the stewards after the sprint after radio messages on the formation lap were alleged to have breach the regulation that "[drivers] must drive the car alone and unaided". All drivers were cleared as the messages were deemed to be permitted.

=== Sprint report ===
Max Verstappen retained his lead into turn one. Carlos Sainz Jr. overtook his Ferrari teammate, Charles Leclerc into turn one and subsequently attempted to overtake Verstappen into turn three, where Sainz went wide. Further back, Lewis Hamilton made contact with Pierre Gasly at turn one, sending the latter into a spin. Both cars carried on. Leclerc reovertook Sainz for second but was unable to catch Verstappen for the rest of the race.

Lando Norris attempted to overtake Alexander Albon at turn three, where Albon forced him off track, for which the FIA punished Albon with a five-second penalty. Albon was later involved in an incident with Sebastian Vettel, which saw Vettel end up in the gravel. He reversed out of the gravel and carried on but retired on lap 21 due to the collision.

Verstappen won the race, with Leclerc and Sainz in second and third. George Russell was fourth and Sergio Pérez fifth. Esteban Ocon finished sixth and Kevin Magnussen was seventh. Hamilton overtook Mick Schumacher with two laps to go for eighth, as Schumacher finished ninth. Valtteri Bottas finished tenth.

=== Sprint classification ===
Pos.	No.	Driver	Constructor	Laps^{a}	Time/Retired	Grid	Points	Final grid
1	1	(Netherlands) Max Verstappen	Red Bull Racing-RBPT	23	26:30.059	1	8	1
2	16	(Monaco) Charles Leclerc	Ferrari	23	+1.675	2	7	2
3	55	(Spain) Carlos Sainz Jr.	Ferrari	23	+5.644	3	6	3
4	63	(United Kingdom) George Russell	Mercedes	23	+13.429	4	5	4
5	11	(Mexico) Sergio Pérez	Red Bull Racing-RBPT	23	+18.302	13	4	5
6	31	(France) Esteban Ocon	Alpine-Renault	23	+31.032	5	3	6
7	20	(Denmark) Kevin Magnussen	Haas-Ferrari	23	+34.539	6	2	7
8	44	(United Kingdom) Lewis Hamilton	Mercedes	23	+35.447	9	1	8
9	47	(Germany) Mick Schumacher	Haas-Ferrari	23	+37.163	7		9
10	77	(Finland) Valtteri Bottas	Alfa Romeo-Ferrari	23	+37.557	12		PL^{b}
11	4	(United Kingdom) Lando Norris	McLaren-Mercedes	23	+38.580	15		10
12	3	(Australia) Daniel Ricciardo	McLaren-Mercedes	23	+39.738	16		11
13	18	(Canada) Lance Stroll	Aston Martin Aramco-Mercedes	23	+48.241	17		12
14	24	(China) Zhou Guanyu	Alfa Romeo-Ferrari	23	+50.753	PL^{c}		13
15	10	(France) Pierre Gasly	AlphaTauri-RBPT	23	+52.125	10		14
16	23	(Thailand) Alexander Albon	Williams-Mercedes	23	+52.412^{d}	11		15
17	22	(Japan) Yuki Tsunoda	AlphaTauri-RBPT	23	+54.556	14		16
18	6	(Canada) Nicholas Latifi	Williams-Mercedes	23	+1:08.694	19		17
19^{e}	5	(Germany) Sebastian Vettel	Aston Martin Aramco-Mercedes	21	Collision damage	20		18
DNS	14	(Spain) Fernando Alonso	Alpine-Renault	0	Electrics	—^{f}		19^{f}
Fastest lap: (Monaco) Charles Leclerc (Ferrari) – 1:08.321 (lap 4)

Notes

- ^a – The sprint distance was scheduled to be completed for 24 laps before being shortened by one lap due to an aborted start procedure.
- ^b – Valtteri Bottas finished 10th, but he was required to start the race from the back of the grid for exceeding his quota of power unit elements. He received a ten-place grid penalty for exceeding his quota of power unit elements. The penalty made no difference as he was already due to start from the back of the grid. He was later required to start the race from the pit lane due to a new rear wing assembly.
- ^c – Zhou Guanyu qualified 18th, but he started the sprint from the pit lane due to a technical issue. His place on the grid was left vacant.
- ^d – Alexander Albon finished 13th, but he received a five-second time penalty for forcing Lando Norris off the track.
- ^e – Sebastian Vettel was classified as he completed more than 90% of the sprint distance.
- ^f – Fernando Alonso did not start the sprint due to an electrics issue. His place on the grid was left vacant. He was later required to start the race from the back of the grid for exceeding his quota of power unit elements. The penalty made no difference as he was already due to start from the back of the grid.

== Race ==
The race was held on 10 July for 71 laps. Max Verstappen held position into turn one, as did Charles Leclerc. Carlos Sainz Jr. was challenged into turn one by George Russell, Sainz went wide, rejoined and pulled ahead of Russell before turn three. Sergio Pérez then attempted to go round the outside of Russell out of turn three. The two went side by side into turn four, where Russell's front left tyre touched Pérez's rear right tyre, spinning Pérez into the gravel. Pérez was demoted to the back, had to pit and later retired as a result of the damage. The stewards deemed that Russell was at fault and gave him a five-second penalty. He pitted to serve his penalty and change his wing, which left him in 19th, only ahead of Pérez.

Leclerc kept up with Verstappen and with DRS assistance, he passed Verstappen for the lead on lap 12. Verstappen pitted a lap later. Leclerc waited until lap 27 before he pitted, coming out behind Verstappen. By lap 33, Leclerc had caught up and passed Verstappen again. Verstappen then pitted on lap 37, but Leclerc waited until lap 49 before pitting. Like before, Leclerc had caught up to and passed Verstappen by lap 53. Sainz, who was on a similar strategy to Leclerc, was in the DRS range of Verstappen. Before Sainz could complete a move on Verstappen, Sainz's power unit failed and he was forced to retire on lap 57. A virtual safety car was deployed and both Leclerc and Verstappen pitted for new medium tyres to take them to the end.

Despite Leclerc struggling with issues with his car, he held off Verstappen and won the race. It was Leclerc's first win without starting on pole. Verstappen was second and picked up an extra point for the fastest lap. Lewis Hamilton was in third and his Mercedes teammate Russell recovered to fourth ahead of Esteban Ocon and Mick Schumacher, the latter having improved his highest Formula One finish. Lando Norris was seventh, Kevin Magnussen was eighth, and Daniel Ricciardo was ninth. Fernando Alonso finished tenth, after a last lap overtake on Valtteri Bottas. Throughout the race, Pierre Gasly, Lando Norris and Zhou Guanyu were given five-second time penalties for track limits. Gasly was given another five-second penalty after he made contact with Sebastian Vettel at turn four.

=== Race classification ===
Pos.	No.	Driver	Constructor	Laps	Time/Retired	Grid	Points
1	16	(Monaco) Charles Leclerc	Ferrari	71	1:24:24.312	2	25
2	1	(Netherlands) Max Verstappen	Red Bull Racing-RBPT	71	+1.532	1	19^{a}
3	44	(United Kingdom) Lewis Hamilton	Mercedes	71	+41.217	8	15
4	63	(United Kingdom) George Russell	Mercedes	71	+58.972	4	12
5	31	(France) Esteban Ocon	Alpine-Renault	71	+1:08.436	6	10
6	47	(Germany) Mick Schumacher	Haas-Ferrari	70	+1 lap	9	8
7	4	(United Kingdom) Lando Norris	McLaren-Mercedes	70	+1 lap	10	6
8	20	(Denmark) Kevin Magnussen	Haas-Ferrari	70	+1 lap	7	4
9	3	(Australia) Daniel Ricciardo	McLaren-Mercedes	70	+1 lap	11	2
10	14	(Spain) Fernando Alonso	Alpine-Renault	70	+1 lap	19	1
11	77	(Finland) Valtteri Bottas	Alfa Romeo-Ferrari	70	+1 lap	PL	
12	23	(Thailand) Alexander Albon	Williams-Mercedes	70	+1 lap	15	
13	18	(Canada) Lance Stroll	Aston Martin Aramco-Mercedes	70	+1 lap	12	
14	24	(China) Zhou Guanyu	Alfa Romeo-Ferrari	70	+1 lap	13	
15	10	(France) Pierre Gasly	AlphaTauri-RBPT	70	+1 lap^{b}	14	
16	22	(Japan) Yuki Tsunoda	AlphaTauri-RBPT	70	+1 lap	16	
17	5	(Germany) Sebastian Vettel	Aston Martin Aramco-Mercedes	70	+1 lap^{c}	18	
Ret	55	(Spain) Carlos Sainz Jr.	Ferrari	56	Power unit	3	
Ret	6	(Canada) Nicholas Latifi	Williams-Mercedes	48	Undertray	17	
Ret	11	(Mexico) Sergio Pérez	Red Bull Racing-RBPT	24	Collision damage	5	
Fastest lap: (Netherlands) Max Verstappen (Red Bull Racing-RBPT) – 1:07.275 (lap 62)

Notes

- ^a – Includes one point for fastest lap.
- ^b – Pierre Gasly received a five-second time penalty for causing a collision with Sebastian Vettel. His final position was not affected by the penalty.
- ^c – Sebastian Vettel finished 16th, but he received a five-second time penalty for exceeding track limits.

== Championship standings after the race ==
Drivers' Championship standings

	Pos.	Driver	Points
	1	(Netherlands) Max Verstappen	208
1	2	(Monaco) Charles Leclerc	170
1	3	(Mexico) Sergio Pérez	151
	4	(Spain) Carlos Sainz Jr.	133
	5	(United Kingdom) George Russell	128

Constructors' Championship standings

Pos.	Constructor	Points
1	(Austria) Red Bull Racing-RBPT	359
2	(Italy) Ferrari	303
3	(Germany) Mercedes	237
4	(United Kingdom) McLaren-Mercedes	81
5	(France) Alpine-Renault	81

- Note: Only the top five positions are included for both sets of standings.

== See also ==
- 2022 Spielberg Formula 2 round
- 2022 Spielberg Formula 3 round

== Notes ==
Previous race: 2022 British Grand Prix	FIA Formula One World Championship; 2022 season	Next race: 2022 French Grand Prix
Previous race: 2021 Austrian Grand Prix	Austrian Grand Prix	Next race: 2023 Austrian Grand Prix
