= Formula One race weekend =

Sporting event

A Formula One race weekend is an auto racing event which takes place over three days (usually Friday to Sunday), with a series of practice and qualifying sessions prior to the race on Sunday. Current regulations provide for two free practice sessions on Friday, a morning practice session and an afternoon qualifying session held on Saturday, and the race held on Sunday afternoon or evening, although the structure of the weekend has changed numerous times over the history of the sport. Historically, the Monaco Grand Prix held practice on Thursday rather than Friday (up to and including 2021), and the whole schedule for the Las Vegas (starting from its inaugural event in 2023), Bahrain and Saudi Arabian Grands Prix (in 2024 only) is brought forward by one day. At most Formula One race weekends, other events such as races in other Fédération Internationale de l'Automobile (FIA) series, such as Formula 2 or Formula 3, are held.

== Free practice ==
Since 2006, a standard Grand Prix weekend has included three free practice sessions, usually abbreviated FP1, FP2 and FP3. In the current standard format, FP1 and FP2 are one-hour sessions on Friday, while FP3 is held on Saturday before qualifying and gives teams additional time to fine-tune car set-ups before parc fermé restrictions begin. On Sprint weekends, the format is shortened to one hour-long practice session before Sprint Qualifying, with the Sprint held on Saturday before Grand Prix qualifying. The first is typically held on Friday morning and the second on Friday afternoon, while the third session is typically on Saturday morning. However when it is a sprint weekend, drivers only get 1 practice session as sprint qualifying (SQ) and the sprint race take up FP2 and FP3 sessions, respectively. From 2021, all sessions last for one hour; prior to this, the Friday sessions were 90 minutes in length and the Saturday session was one hour in length. In addition, starting in 2021, cars are now put under parc fermé conditions after the third practice session instead of qualifying. Private tests are now heavily restricted, but a third driver (such as a reserve, test, or junior driver) is permitted to take part in the first Friday free practice session in the place of a regular driver. The second practice session for the Bahrain, Singapore and Abu Dhabi Grands Prix takes place in the evening, as these races are run at night. All practice sessions for the Las Vegas Grand Prix were held at night, with the first two on Thursday, the third and qualifying on Friday and the race held on Saturday.

== Qualifying ==
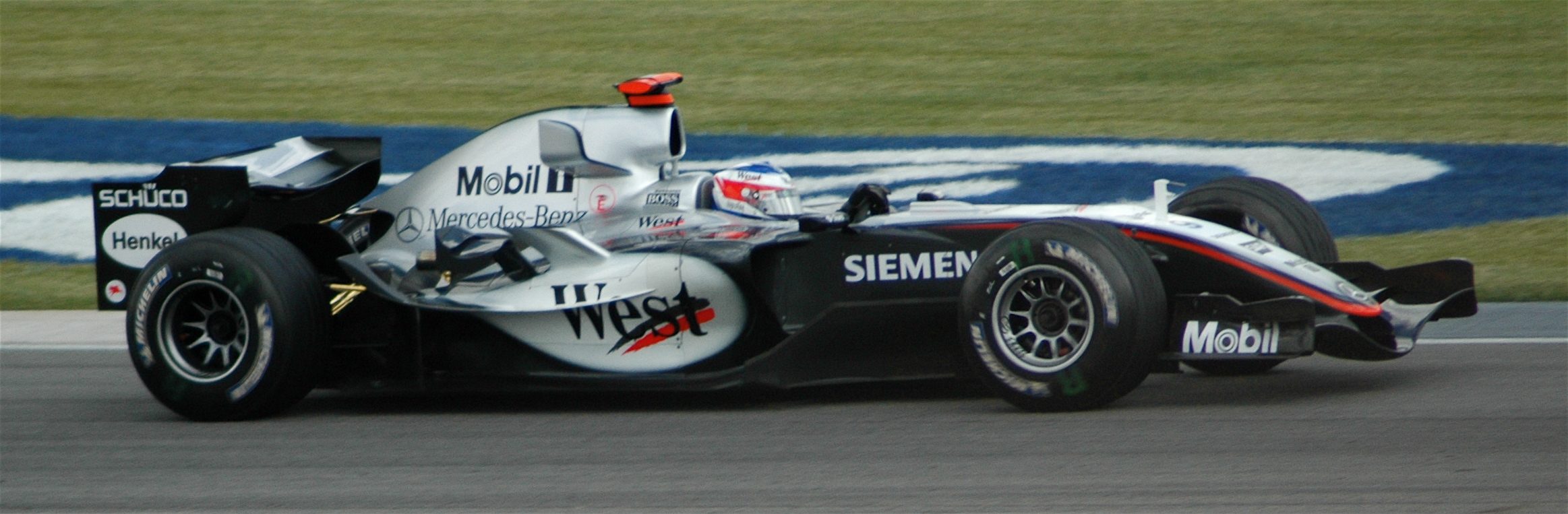
Kimi Räikkönen at Indianapolis Motor Speedway during the qualifying for 2005 United States Grand Prix

Formula 1 qualifying takes place before each race to decide the starting grid order. The driver who sets the fastest lap starts from pole position at the front of the grid, while slower lap times line up progressively behind. Any drivers unable to set a qualifying time, for mechanical, weather, or penalty-related reasons, are placed at the back of the grid.

=== Historical methods ===
Traditionally before 1996, qualifying was split into two one-hour sessions; the first was held on Friday (Thursday at Monaco) afternoon from 13:00 to 14:00 local time, with the second held on Saturday afternoon at the same time. The fastest time set by each driver from either session counted towards their final grid position. Each driver was limited to twelve laps per session.

In 1996, qualifying was amended with the Friday qualifying session abolished in a favour for a single qualifying session held on Saturday afternoon. Each driver was limited to twelve laps with the inclusion of a 107% rule to exclude drivers with slow lap times. This was calculated by using the time of the driver on pole position and adding on 7% to create a cut-off time. This format remained until the conclusion of the 2002 season. Between 2003 and 2005, the qualifying session was run as a one-lap session and took place on Friday and Saturday afternoon with the cars running one at a time, immediately returning to the pits through the pit exit after completing their laps. In 2003, the Friday running order was determined with the leader of the Drivers' Championship heading out first. The Saturday running order was determined by times set in Friday afternoon qualifying with the fastest heading out last and the slowest running first. No refuelling was allowed between the start of Saturday qualifying and the start of the race, so drivers qualified on race fuel. The lap times from the Friday afternoon session did not determine the grid order.

In 2004, the Friday session was moved to Saturday. The running order for the first session was now based on the result of the previous race. At first both sessions were held back-to-back, but the first session was later moved earlier in the day. At the start of 2005, the sessions were held on Saturday afternoon and Sunday morning. Lap times from both sessions were counted to give the overall aggregate position. From the 2005 European Grand Prix onwards, the Sunday morning session was dropped for a single run on Saturday afternoon having proved unpopular with drivers, teams and broadcasters. The running order was the reverse of the previous race result.

=== Current format ===
Since 2006, qualifying takes place on Saturday afternoon in a three-stage "knockout" system. One hour is dedicated to determining the grid order, divided into three periods with short intermissions between them. Since the target is to have all but 10 cars eliminated by the third (and last) qualifying period (Q3), this elimination is done in two stages: half of the number of cars scheduled for elimination are eliminated in the first qualifying period (Q1), with the other half in the second qualifying period (Q2). E.g. in 2025 and earlier years, when 20 cars entered the championship, this elimination was done in packs of 5 cars each in Q1 and Q2; and in 2026, when 22 cars entered the championship, this elimination was done in packs of 6 cars.

Since 2010, Q1 is eighteen minutes long, with all cars competing. The slowest drivers are eliminated from further qualification rounds, and fill the bottom positions on the grid based on their fastest lap time. Any driver attempting to set a qualifying time when the period ends is permitted to finish their lap, though no new laps may be started once the chequered flag is shown. After a short break, Q2 (15 minutes long) begins, with remaining cars on the circuit. At the end of Q2, the slowest drivers are once again eliminated, filling grid positions above the drivers eliminated in Q1. Finally, Q3 (previously 12 minutes, now 13 minutes long from 2026 onwards) features the ten fastest drivers from the second period. The drivers are issued a new set of soft tyres and their fastest time in this session determines the top ten positions on the grid. The driver who sets the fastest qualifying time in Q3 is said to be on pole position, the grid position that offers the best physical location on the grid from which to start the race. Drivers may complete as many laps as they choose within the permitted qualifying session's time. As of 2022, all drivers are permitted to start the race on the tyre of their choice regardless of their grid position, whereas previously it was required for the drivers starting in the top 10 grid positions to start on the same tyre as the one that they set their fastest lap time within the second qualifying session. Generally, a driver will leave the pits and drive around the track in order to get to the start/finish line (the out-lap). Having crossed the line, they will attempt to achieve the quickest time around the circuit that they can, in one or more laps (the flying lap(s) or hot lap(s)). This is the lap time which is used in calculating grid position. Finally, the driver will continue back around the track and re-enter the pit lane (the in-lap); however, this is merely strategy, and no teams are obliged by the rules to follow this formula, as drivers may elect to set several flying laps before returning to the pits, and even intersperse them with slow laps without returning to the pits. For the first two races of the 2016 season, a modified format was used where drivers were eliminated during the sessions rather than just at the end and only eight drivers progressed to the final session. Qualifying reverted to the previous format from the 2016 Chinese Grand Prix onwards.

==== Sprint qualifying ====
Following the decision to make sprints standalone from 2023 onwards, sprints were given a dedicated qualifying session, dubbed in 2023 "sprint shootout" and starting from 2024 "sprint qualifying". The format of sprint qualifying is the same as qualifying, but with the three segments (dubbed "SQ1", "SQ2" and "SQ3" instead of "Q1", "Q2" and "Q3") being shorter at 12 minutes, 10 minutes and 8 minutes. Initially, new tyres were mandatory for each phase, with mediums for SQ1 and SQ2, and softs for SQ3. This was changed for the 2023 Austrian Grand Prix to allow teams the ability to use any set of soft tyres, be it new or used, for SQ3, after Lando Norris could not run in SQ3 at the 2023 Azerbaijan Grand Prix, after exhausting his allocation of soft tyres. (Note: In theory, Norris could have run intermediate wet or full wet tyres during the dry SQ3 session.)

=== Qualifying requirements ===
As of 2026, eleven teams are entered for the Formula One World Championship, each entering two cars for a total of twenty-two cars. The regulations place a limit of twenty-six entries for the championship. At some periods in the history of Formula One the number of cars entered for each race has exceeded the number permitted, which historically would vary from race to race according to the circuit used; Monaco, for example, for many years allowed only twenty cars to compete because of the restricted space available. The slowest cars excess to the circuit limit would not qualify for the race and would be listed as 'Did not qualify' (DNQ) in race results.

==== Historical pre-qualifying ====
There had been pre-qualifying sessions in the late 1970s, but during the late 1980s and early 1990s the number of cars attempting to enter each race was as high as thirty-nine for some races. Because of the dangers of having so many cars on the track at the same time, pre-qualifying sessions were re-introduced for the teams with the worst record over the previous twelve months, including any new teams. Usually, only the four fastest cars from this session were then allowed into the qualifying session proper, where thirty cars competed for twenty-six places on the starting grid for the race. The slowest cars from the pre-qualifying session were listed in race results as 'Did Not Pre-Qualify' (DNPQ). Pre-qualifying was discontinued after the 1992 Hungarian Grand Prix when many small teams withdrew from the sport.

==== 107% rule ====
As the number of cars entered in the world championship fell below twenty-six, a situation arose in which any car entered would automatically qualify for the race, no matter how slowly it had been driven. The 107% rule was introduced in 1996 to prevent completely uncompetitive cars being entered in the championship. If a car's qualifying time was not within 107% of the pole sitter's time, that car would not qualify for the race, unless at the discretion of the race stewards for a situation such as a rain-affected qualifying session. For example, if the pole-sitter's time was one minute and forty seconds, any car eligible for racing had to set a time within one minute and forty-seven seconds.

The 107% rule was removed in 2003 since the FIA's rules indicated previously that 24 cars could take the start of a Formula One race, and a minimum of twenty cars had to enter a race. In 2003, the qualifying procedure changed to a single-lap system, rendering the rule inoperable. However, there were concerns about the pace of the new teams in the 2010 season. As the qualifying procedure had been changed since the 2006 season to a three-part knockout system, the rule could now be reintroduced. As such, the 107% rule was reintroduced in the 2011 Formula One season. Currently, cars eliminated in Q1 have to be within 107% of the fastest Q1 time in order to qualify for the race.

Since the rule was re-introduced, only twice have cars failed to qualify for a Grand Prix – both times involving Hispania Racing cars and both times occurring at the Australian Grand Prix, namely in 2011 (Vitantonio Liuzzi and Narain Karthikeyan) and 2012 (Karthikeyan and Pedro de la Rosa). At their discretion, stewards may permit a driver who fails to set a qualifying time within the desired 107% span to enter the race; for example, at the 2018 British Grand Prix, Lance Stroll and Brendon Hartley both failed to set times within 107%, but were permitted to race on the grounds of satisfactory lap times in free practice. After eleven drivers failed to set satisfactory Q1 times at the 2016 Hungarian Grand Prix due to inclement weather, the regulations were amended in 2018 so that wet sessions were not subject to the 107% rule.

=== Grid penalties ===
Drivers or cars may be issued penalties against their starting positions, commonly for exceeding component limits, or sporting offences in free practice, qualifying, or a previous race. This can lead to the starting grid being significantly different from the qualifying order.

== Sprint ==
During the 2021 Formula One World Championship, Formula One trialed a "sprint qualifying" system at three Grands Prix—Great Britain, Italy, and São Paulo—in which the grid for the race on Sunday was determined by a 100 km sprint on Saturday. On a race weekend with sprint qualifying, the sessions on Friday, instead of regular two practice sessions, consisted of one practice session and a traditional qualifying session, which was limited to soft tyres and which set the grid for sprint qualifying. Only the winner of the sprint qualifying was considered to have taken pole position for the main Grand Prix, and they received a trophy similar to the pole position trophy awarded at other race weekends. The top three finishers in sprint qualifying in 2021 received World Championship points in a 3–2–1 scoring system. Formula One stuck with having sprints at three events, after initially planning to increase it to six events. These plans were abandoned after teams failed to agree on the cost-cap considerations for additional sprint events.

For the 2022 season, "sprint qualifying" was renamed to "sprint". The weekend format remained unchanged from 2021 and was run at the Emilia Romagna, Austrian, and São Paulo Grands Prix with points now awarded to the top eight finishers rather than the top three finishers as was the case in 2021. Unlike the 2021 season, the driver who set the fastest time in qualifying was credited as the official pole-sitter (unless penalised), with the winner of the sprint continuing to have the right to start the main race from the first-place grid position.

From 2023, standalone sprint events were implemented, meaning that the outcome of the sprint race would no longer set the grid for the main race. These plans were approved a few days before the 2023 Azerbaijan Grand Prix – the first of the six events on the 2023 calendar to feature the sprint format. The format for sprint events in 2023 featured Friday consisting of a single practice session followed by the qualifying session which set the starting grid for the main race on Sunday; while Saturday featured a special qualifying session, named the sprint shootout, which set the grid for the sprint race (called the "sprint") which was also held later on Saturday. The structure of the sprint weekends was changed again for 2024, with the goal of rationalising sprint events and separating them from the rest of the Grand Prix weekend. The sprint shootout, which sets the starting grid order for the sprint race, was moved to Friday afternoon after the weekend's only practice session. The sprint shootout was also renamed sprint qualifying. The sprint will then be the first session to take place on Saturday, followed by qualifying for the main race. The Grand Prix itself remains on Sunday. For the first three seasons of the sprint format, there was a single parc fermé period starting from Friday's Grand Prix qualifying session all the way through to the start of the Grand Prix. However, for 2024, there are two separate parc fermé periods: the first lasts from the start of sprint qualifying to the start of the Sprint and the second lasts from Saturday's Grand Prix qualifying to the start of the Grand Prix itself. This is intended to allow teams to fine tune their cars between the end of the sprint and the start of Grand Prix qualifying.

== Race ==
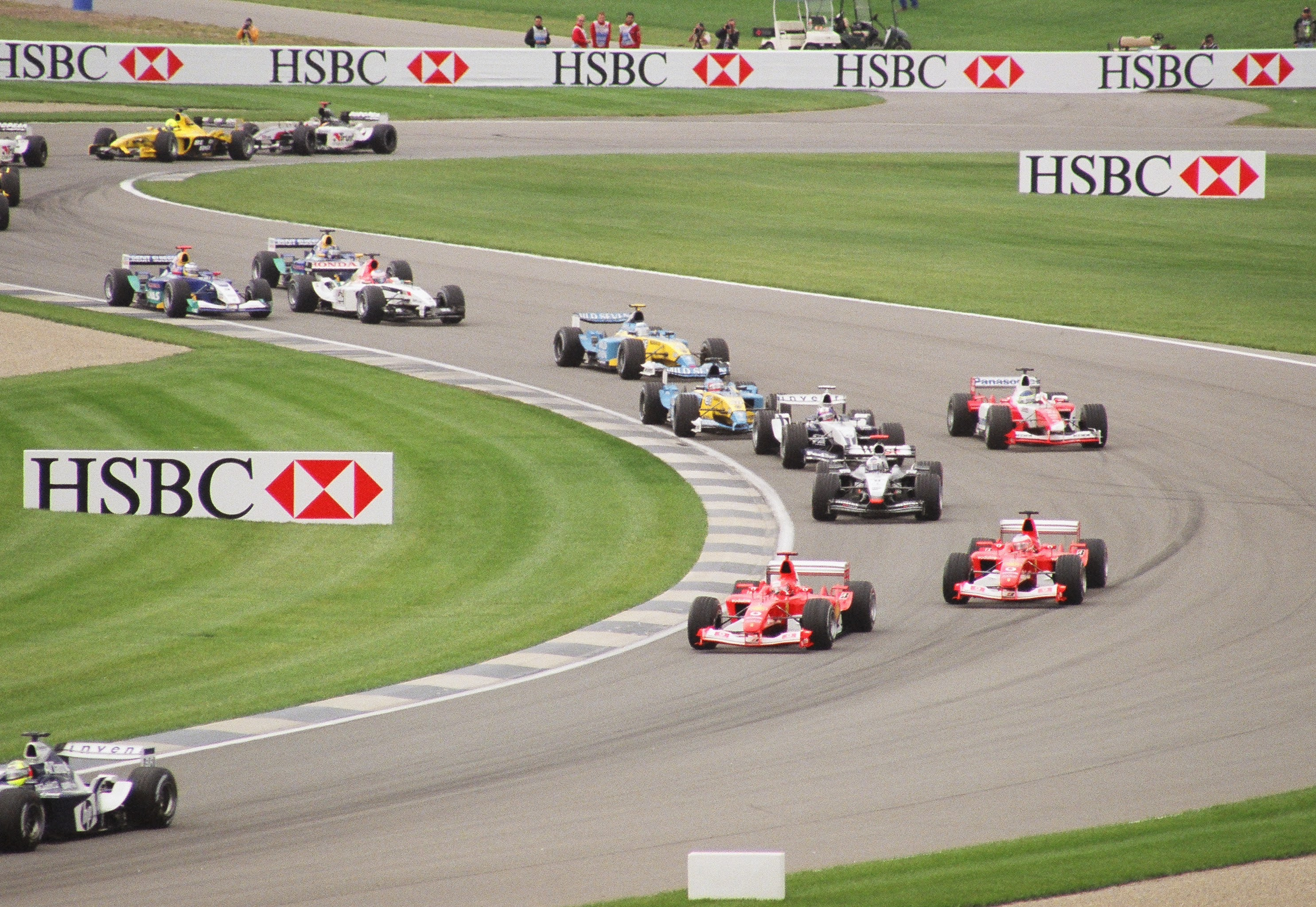
Formula One cars wind through the infield section of the Indianapolis Motor Speedway during the race for 2003 United States Grand Prix.

The race itself is usually held on a Sunday afternoon. Exceptions to the rule in 2025 were the night or evening races at Singapore, Bahrain, Qatar, Las Vegas, Saudi Arabia, and Abu Dhabi, as well as the Las Vegas Grand Prix being held on a Saturday since 2023. Prior to that, the last race not to take place on a Sunday was the 1985 South African Grand Prix, which took place on a Saturday.

The race distance is determined as the smallest number of complete laps that exceed 305 kilometres (190 mi) in total distance, with the exception of the Monaco Grand Prix which is run over the least number of laps to exceed 260 kilometres (160 mi). Occasionally, races are truncated due to special circumstances. The maximum length of a race is two hours; if a race reaches the two-hour mark, the chequered flags are waved at the end of the next lap. Time under potential red flag conditions does not count towards the race time, though a red flag stoppage of a race must not exceed three hours. (Note: Four hours until 2011.) At the 2021 Belgian Grand Prix, the three hour countdown was stopped with force majeure being cited. Regulation changes for the 2027 season will abolish the three-hour clock, which was used to determine the length of a race when including stoppages; it will be replaced with a hard stop for racing activity.

=== Race start ===
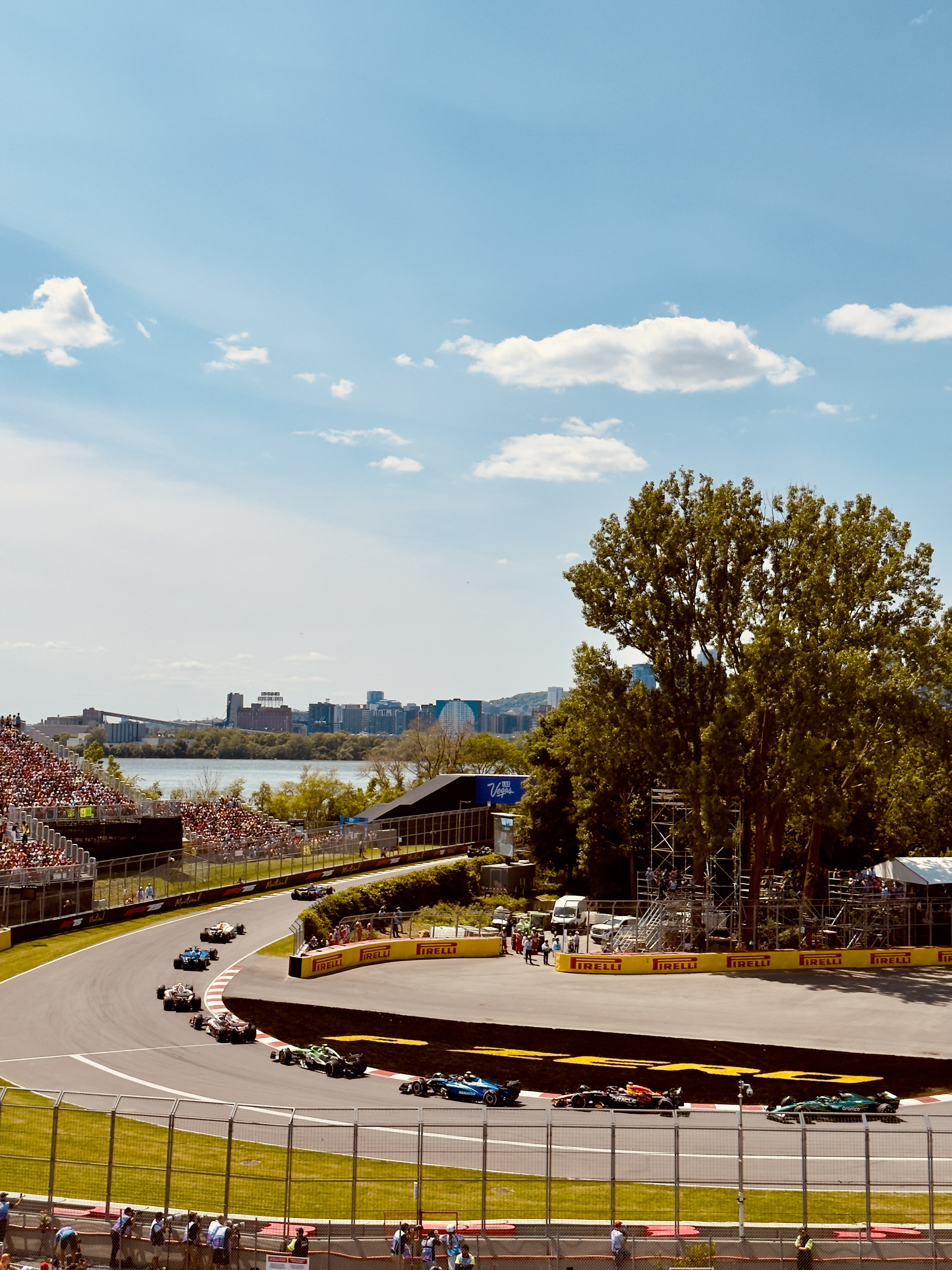
Opening lap of the 2025 Canadian Grand Prix

Thirty minutes prior to race time, the cars take to the track for any number of warm-up laps (formally known as reconnaissance laps), provided they pass through the pit lane and not the grid, after which they assemble on the starting grid in the order they qualified, including pit crews and various equipment. At the hour of the race, a green light signifies the beginning of the relatively slow formation lap during which all cars parade around the course with the opportunity of a final tyre warmup and system check. Meanwhile the pit crews and their equipment return to the pits, before the cars return to their assigned grid spot for a standing race start. The starting light system, which consists of five pairs of lights mounted above the start/finish line, then lights up each pair at one-second intervals. Once all five pairs are illuminated, after a random length of time between 0.2 and 3 seconds, the red lights are turned off by the race director, at which point the race starts.

=== Pit stops ===
Each driver is also required to use two different types of dry compound during a dry race, and so must make a mandatory pit stop. Timing pit stops with reference to other cars is crucial—if they are following another car but are unable to pass, the driver may try to stay on the track as long as possible, or pit immediately, as newer tyres are usually faster. Prior to the 2010 season, drivers used to make pit stops for fuel more than once during a race, as the cars on average traveled two kilometres per litre (approximately five miles per gallon). Nowadays this figure is higher, due to changes in engines from 2014, and as a result refuelling has been forbidden during a race since 2010. If a driver starts the race using intermediate or wet tyres, they are not mandated to make a pit stop.

=== Podium ceremony ===
At the end of the race, the first, second and third-placed drivers take their places on a podium, where they stand as the national anthem of the race winner's home country and that of their team is played. Dignitaries from the country hosting the race then present trophies to the drivers and a constructor's trophy to a representative from the winner's team, and the winning drivers spray champagne and are interviewed. The three drivers then go to a media room for a press conference where they answer questions in English and their native languages.

== Points system ==
=== Historical methods ===
Historically, the races were scored on the basis of a five-place tally: i.e. via an 8–6–4–3–2 scoring system, with the holder of the fastest race lap also receiving a bonus point. In 1961, the scoring was revised to give the winner nine points instead of eight, and the single point awarded for fastest lap was given for sixth place for the first time the previous year. In 1991, the points system was again revised to give the victor 10 points, with all other scorers recording the same 6–4–3–2–1 result. In 2003, the FIA further revised the scoring system to apportion points to the first eight classified finishers (a classified finisher must complete 90% of race distance) on a 10–8–6–5–4–3–2–1 basis.

At certain points between 1950 and 1990, drivers' points for the season would be tallied based on their best results across the World Championship, which varied from 4 to 11 in a season, and during the late 1960s and 1970s points would be tallied based on their best results from each half of the season, which varied from four to seven. This was done in order to equalise the footings of teams which may not have had the wherewithal to compete in all events. With the advent of the Concorde Agreements, this practice has been discontinued, though it did feature prominently in several world championships through the 1970s and 1980s, primarily in 1988 when Alain Prost scored a total of 105 points to Ayrton Senna's 94, but due to only the best 11 results counting towards the World Championship, Senna won, with the final points tally being 90–87.

=== Current system ===
| Format | % Completed | Position | | | | | | | | | |
| Format | % Completed | 1st | 2nd | 3rd | 4th | 5th | 6th | 7th | 8th | 9th | 10th |
|---|---|---|---|---|---|---|---|---|---|---|---|
| Race | 75% – 100% | 25 | 18 | 15 | 12 | 10 | 8 | 6 | 4 | 2 | 1 |
| Race | 50% – <75% (Note: At least two laps must be completed under green flag conditions; applies both to the races which are stopped under the red flag and not restarted, as well as to the races shortened due to reaching a predetermined time limit.) | 19 | 14 | 12 | 10 | 8 | 6 | 4 | 3 | 2 | 1 |
| Race | 25% – <50% | 13 | 10 | 8 | 6 | 5 | 4 | 3 | 2 | 1 | None |
| Race | 2 racing laps – <25% | 6 | 4 | 3 | 2 | 1 | None | | | | |
| Race | <2 racing laps | None | | | | | | | | | |
| Sprint (Note: This system is used for the sprint races (aka "sprints").) | | 8 | 7 | 6 | 5 | 4 | 3 | 2 | 1 | None | |

Points are awarded to drivers and teams based on where they finish in a race. The winner receives 25 points, the second-place finisher 18 points, with 15, 12, 10, 8, 6, 4, 2 and 1 points for positions 3 through 10, respectively. In a dead heat, prizes and points are added together and shared equally for all those drivers who tie. The winner of the annual championship is the driver (or team, for the Constructors' Championship) with the most points. If the number of points is the same, priority is given to the driver with more wins. If that is the same it will be decided on the most second places and so on.
