= List of career achievements by Max Verstappen =

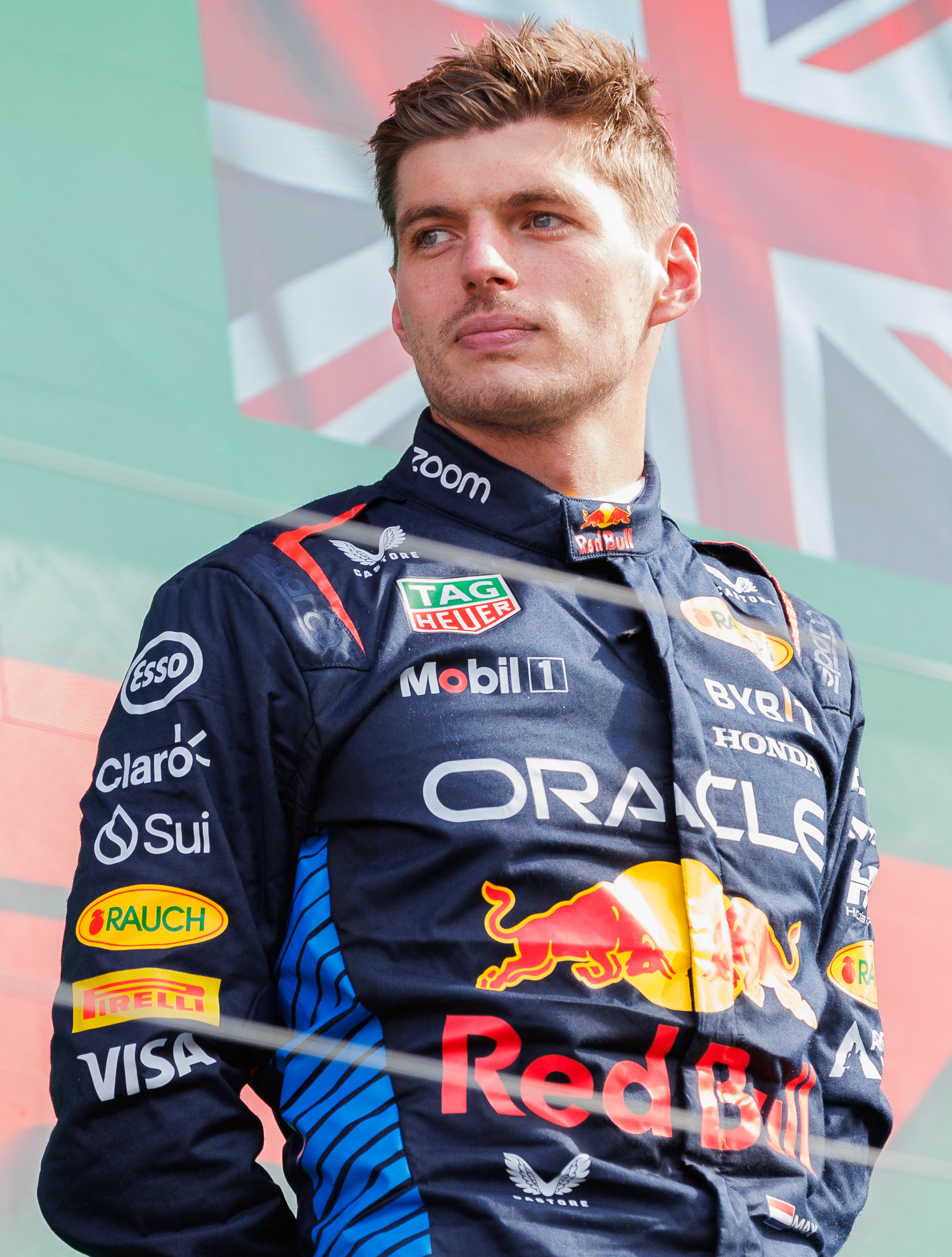
Verstappen at the 2024 Dutch Grand Prix

Max Verstappen is a Dutch and Belgian racing driver. Throughout his career in the grassroots categories, he won three CIK-FIA championships in a single season (2013), an unprecedented feat in the history of the discipline, as he went on to win six championship titles that year. Aged sixteen, he also competed in the 2014 FIA Formula 3 European Championship, where he achieved ten victories, including a record six consecutive wins, becoming the youngest race winner and polesitter in Formula Three history. He also competed in and won the 2014 Zandvoort Masters. In his Formula One career, Verstappen has won four world titles.

== Karting record ==
=== Karting career summary ===
Season	Series	Team	Position
2005	VAS Championship – Mini Junior		1st
2005	Dutch N.A.B. Championship – Mini Junior		16th
2005	Limburgs Kart Championship – Mini Junior		2nd
2006	VAS Championship – Mini Junior		1st
2007	Chrono Dutch Rotax Max Challenge – Mini Max		35th
2007	Dutch Championship – Rotax Mini Max		1st
2007	Rotax Max Challenge Belgium – Mini Max	Jos Verstappen	1st
2008	VAS Championship – Mini		NC
2008	Belgian Championship – Cadet	Jos Verstappen	1st
2008	Rotax Max Challenge Belgium – Mini Max	Jos Verstappen	1st
2008	BNL Karting Series – Mini Max	Verstappen Racing	1st
2009	Rotax Max Challenge Belgium – Mini Max		1st
2009	Belgian Championship – KF5	Pex Racing Team	1st
2009	BNL Karting Series – Mini Max	Pex Racing Team	1st
2010	South Garda Winter Cup – KF3	CRG	2nd
2010	WSK Euro Series – KF3	CRG	1st
2010	CIK-FIA European Championship Qualification Region Nord – KF3	CRG	2nd
2010	CIK-FIA European Championship – KF3	CRG	5th
2010	CIK-FIA World Cup – KF3	CRG	2nd
2010	Bridgestone Cup European Final – KF3	CRG	1st
2010	WSK World Series – KF3	CRG	1st
2010	WSK Nations Cup – KF3	CRG	1st
2011	South Garda Winter Cup – KF3	CRG	2nd
2011	WSK Master Series – KF3	CRG	19th
2011	North European Trophy – KF3	CRG	DNF
2011	CIK-FIA European Championship – KF3	CRG	14th
2011	WSK Euro Series – KF3	CRG	1st
2011	CIK-FIA World Cup – KF3	CRG	DNF
2012	South Garda Winter Cup – KF2	Intrepid Driver Program	1st
2012	BNL Karting Series – KZ2	Intrepid Driver Program	10th
2012	WSK Master Series – KF2	Intrepid Driver Program	1st
2012	CIK-FIA European Championship – KF2	Intrepid Driver Program	10th
2012	WSK Euro Series – KF2	Intrepid Driver Program	6th
2012	German Karting Championship – KZ2	Intrepid Driver Program	NC
2012	CIK-FIA World Cup – KZ2	CRG	DNF
2012	CIK-FIA World Cup – KF2	CRG	2nd
2012	CIK-FIA World Championship – KF1	CRG	8th
2012	SKUSA SuperNationals – KZ2	PSL Karting	21st
2013	South Garda Winter Cup – KF2	CRG	1st
2013	Rotax Max Euro Challenge – Senior	CRG	32nd
2013	WSK Euro Series – KZ1	CRG	1st
2013	WSK Master Series – KZ2	CRG	1st
2013	CIK-FIA European Championship – KF	CRG	1st
2013	CIK-FIA European Championship – KZ	CRG	1st
2013	CIK-FIA World Championship – KF	CRG	3rd
2013	CIK-FIA World Championship – KZ	CRG	1st

== FIA Formula 3 European Championship ==
=== Wins ===
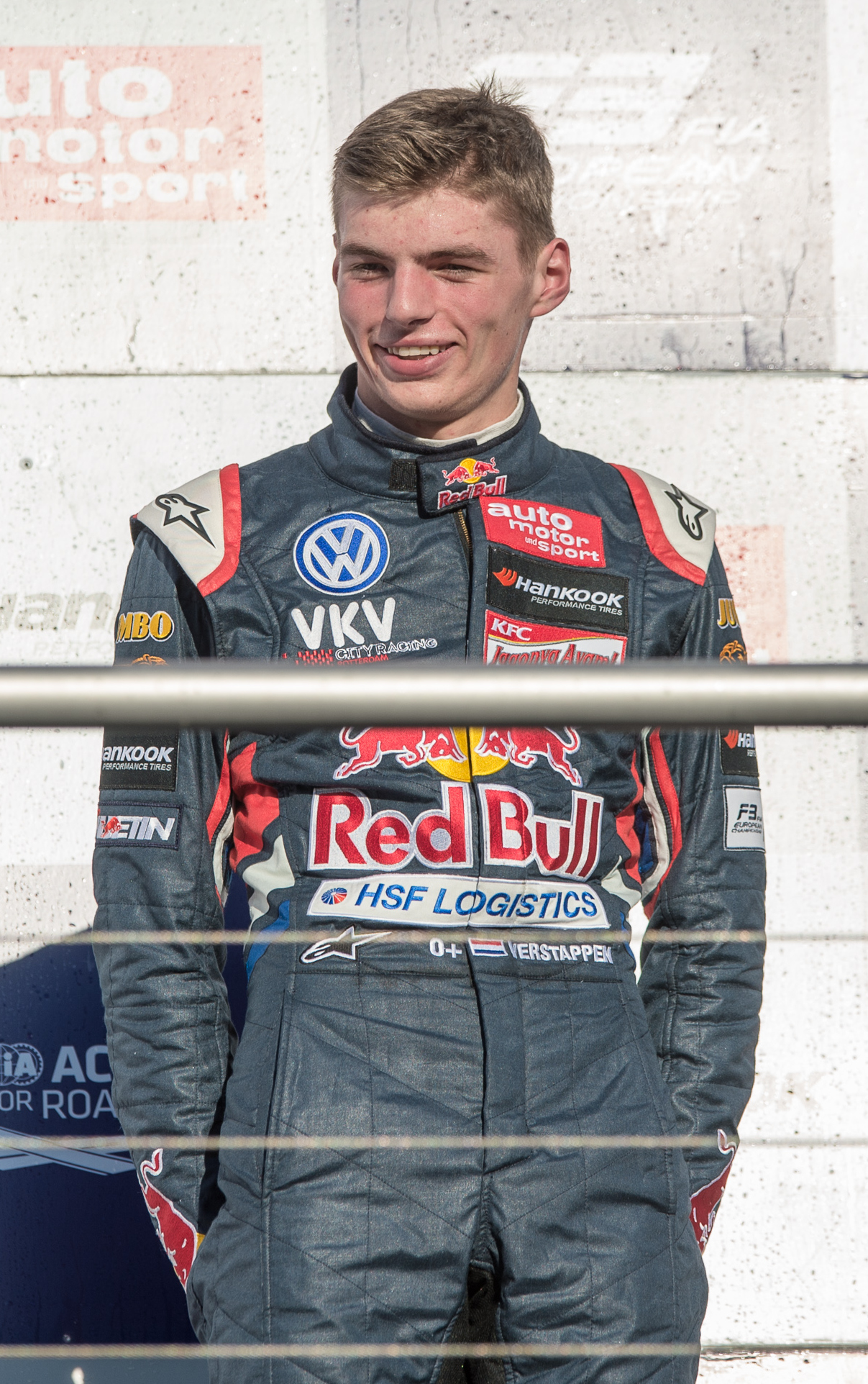
Verstappen in 2014 at the Hockenheimring

No.	Season	Series	Circuit	Grid	Margin	Team	Engine	Ref
1	2014	FIA Formula 3 European Championship	Hockenheimring	1	0:00.860	Van Amersfoort Racing	Volkswagen	
2	2014	FIA Formula 3 European Championship	Circuit de Spa-Francorchamps	2	0:00.817	Van Amersfoort Racing	Volkswagen	
3	2014	FIA Formula 3 European Championship	Circuit de Spa-Francorchamps	2	0:00.805	Van Amersfoort Racing	Volkswagen	
4	2014	FIA Formula 3 European Championship	Circuit de Spa-Francorchamps	5	0:01.000	Van Amersfoort Racing	Volkswagen	
5	2014	FIA Formula 3 European Championship	Norisring	3	0:01.125	Van Amersfoort Racing	Volkswagen	
6	2014	FIA Formula 3 European Championship	Norisring	1	0:08.827	Van Amersfoort Racing	Volkswagen	
7	2014	FIA Formula 3 European Championship	Norisring	1	0:04.761	Van Amersfoort Racing	Volkswagen	
8	2014	FIA Formula 3 European Championship	Nürburgring	1	0:03.275	Van Amersfoort Racing	Volkswagen	
9	2014	FIA Formula 3 European Championship	Imola Circuit	1	0:02.100	Van Amersfoort Racing	Volkswagen	
10	2014	FIA Formula 3 European Championship	Hockenheimring	1	0:03.783	Van Amersfoort Racing	Volkswagen	

=== Podiums ===
No.	Season	Series	Circuit	Grid	Final	Team	Engine	Ref
1	2014	FIA Formula 3 European Championship	Silverstone Circuit	5	2	Van Amersfoort Racing	Volkswagen	
2	2014	FIA Formula 3 European Championship	Hockenheimring	1	1	Van Amersfoort Racing	Volkswagen	
3	2014	FIA Formula 3 European Championship	Pau Grand Prix	3	3	Van Amersfoort Racing	Volkswagen	
4	2014	FIA Formula 3 European Championship	Circuit de Spa-Francorchamps	2	1	Van Amersfoort Racing	Volkswagen	
5	2014	FIA Formula 3 European Championship	Circuit de Spa-Francorchamps	2	1	Van Amersfoort Racing	Volkswagen	
6	2014	FIA Formula 3 European Championship	Circuit de Spa-Francorchamps	5	1	Van Amersfoort Racing	Volkswagen	
7	2014	FIA Formula 3 European Championship	Norisring	3	1	Van Amersfoort Racing	Volkswagen	
8	2014	FIA Formula 3 European Championship	Norisring	1	1	Van Amersfoort Racing	Volkswagen	
9	2014	FIA Formula 3 European Championship	Norisring	1	1	Van Amersfoort Racing	Volkswagen	
10	2014	FIA Formula 3 European Championship	Moscow Raceway	4	3	Van Amersfoort Racing	Volkswagen	
11	2014	FIA Formula 3 European Championship	Moscow Raceway	3	2	Van Amersfoort Racing	Volkswagen	
12	2014	FIA Formula 3 European Championship	Nürburgring	1	1	Van Amersfoort Racing	Volkswagen	
13	2014	FIA Formula 3 European Championship	Nürburgring	13	3	Van Amersfoort Racing	Volkswagen	
14	2014	FIA Formula 3 European Championship	Imola Circuit	11	2	Van Amersfoort Racing	Volkswagen	
15	2014	FIA Formula 3 European Championship	Imola Circuit	1	1	Van Amersfoort Racing	Volkswagen	
16	2014	FIA Formula 3 European Championship	Hockenheimring	1	1	Van Amersfoort Racing	Volkswagen	

== Formula One ==
As of the 2026 Las Vegas Grand Prix

=== World titles ===
No.	Season	Team	Wins	Podiums	Pole positions	Retirements	Points	Ref.
1	2021	Red Bull	10	18	10	3	395.5	
2	2022	Red Bull	15	17	7	2	454	
3	2023	Red Bull	19	21	12	0	575	
4	2024	Red Bull	9	14	8	1	437	

=== Wins ===
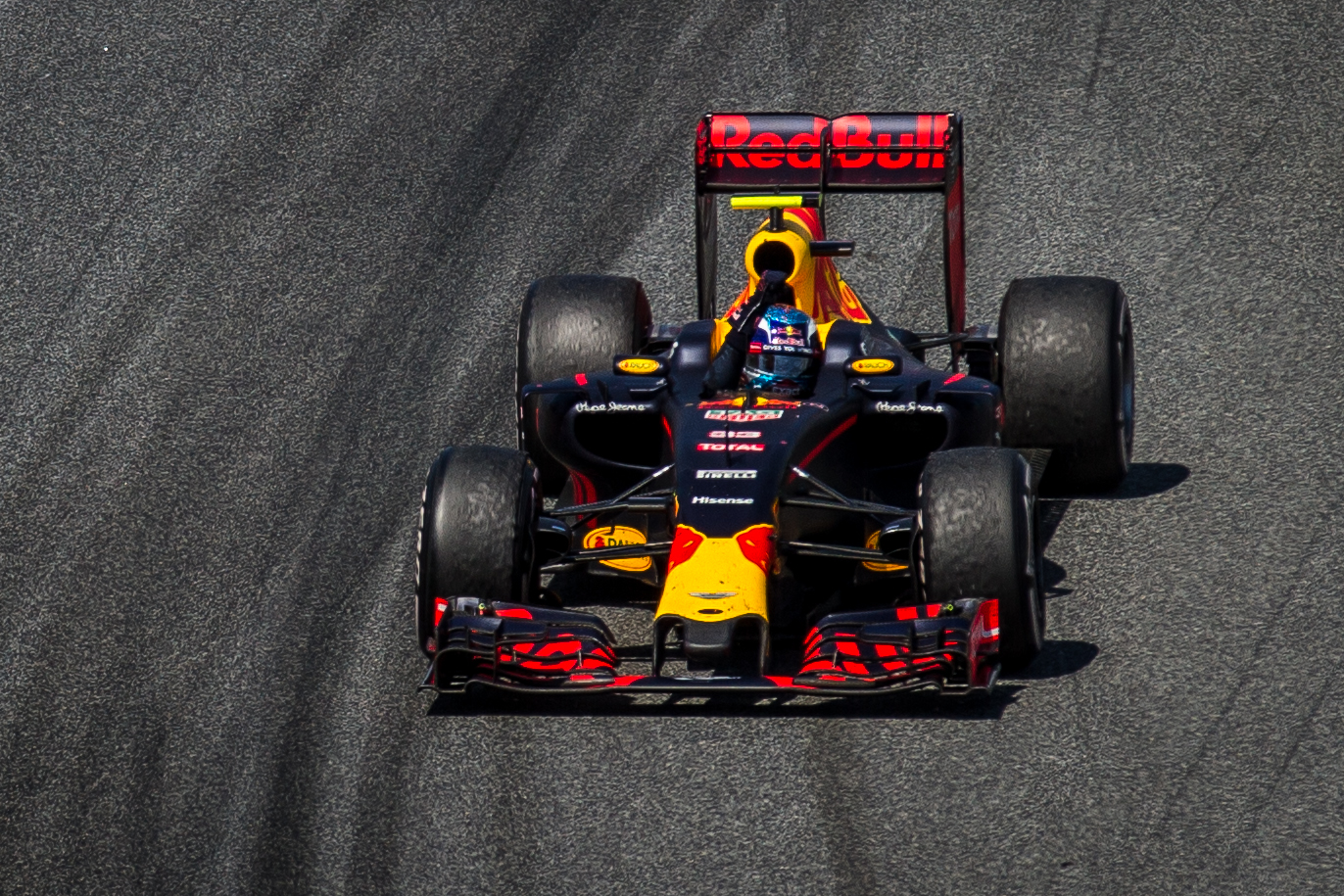
Verstappen celebrating victory at the 2016 Spanish Grand Prix, in his first race for the Red Bull Racing team

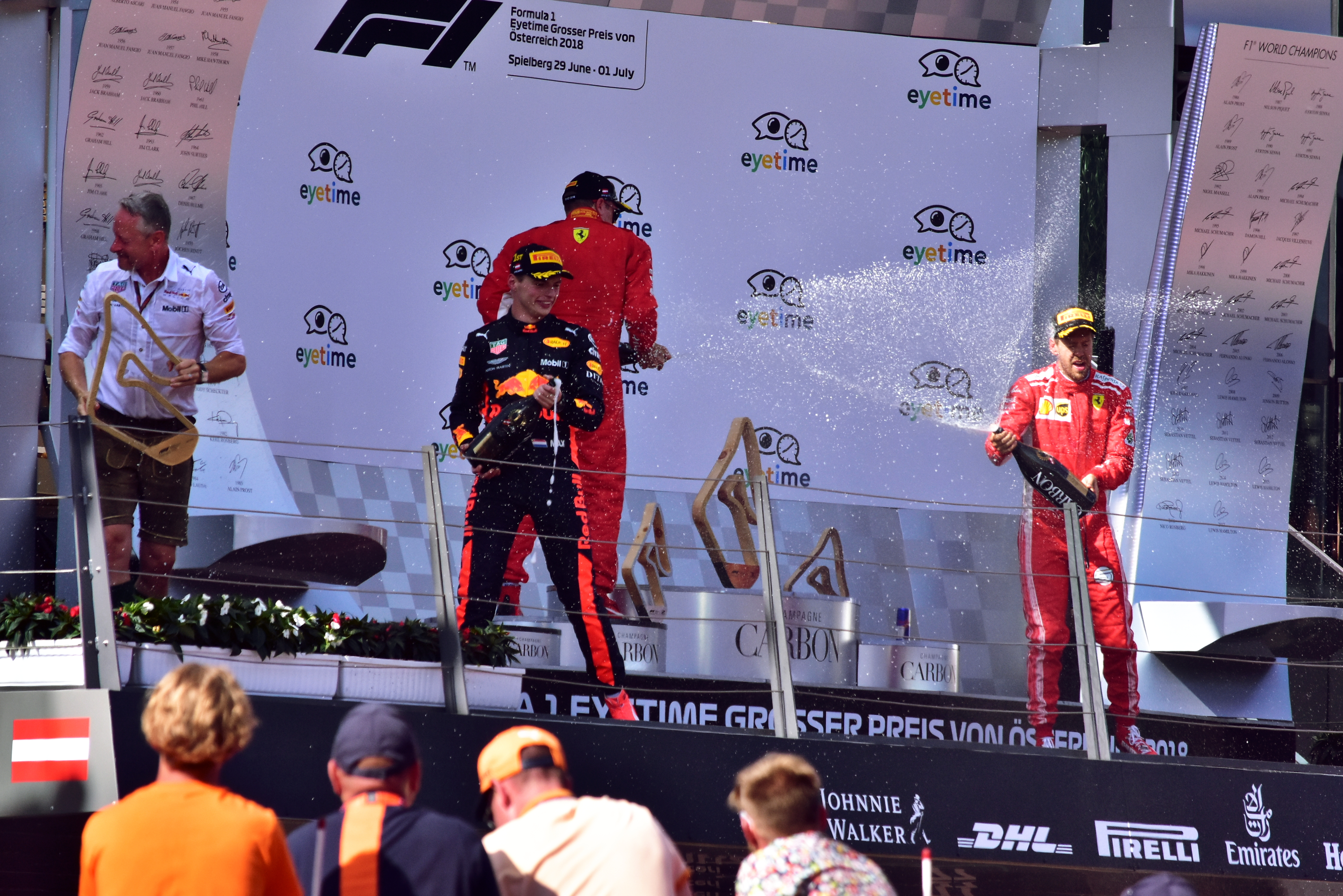
Verstappen celebrating on the podium with Kimi Räikkönen and Sebastian Vettel after winning the 2018 Austrian Grand Prix

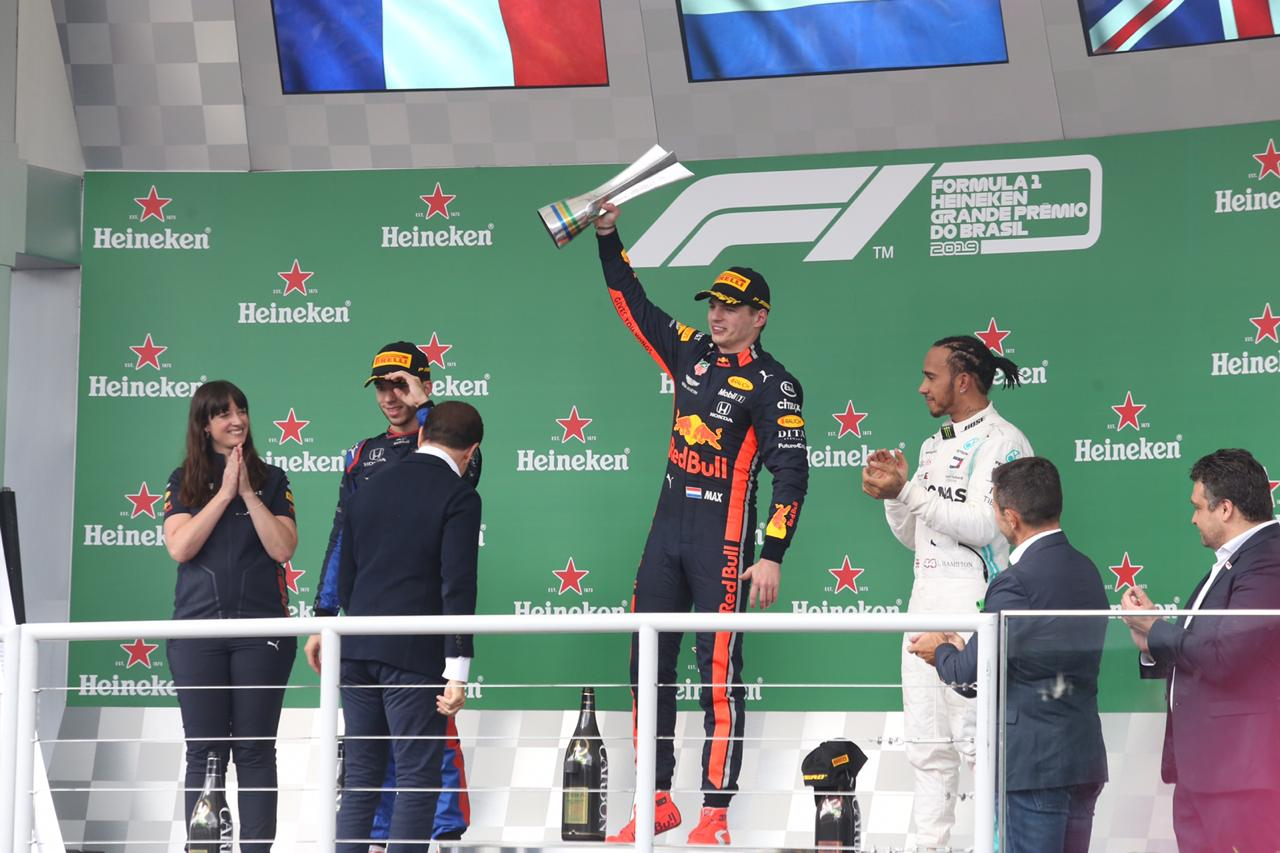
Verstappen on the podium after winning the 2019 Brazilian Grand Prix

Key:

- No. – Victory number; for example, "1" signifies Verstappen's first race win.
- Race – Race number in Verstappen's Formula One career; for example "15" signifies Verstappen's 15th Formula One race.
- Grid – The position on the grid from which Verstappen started the race
- Margin – Margin of victory, given in the format of minutes:seconds.milliseconds
- † – Driver's Championship winning season.

Grand Prix victories
No.	Race	Date	Season	Grand Prix	Circuit	Grid	Margin	Team	Engine	Chassis	Ref
1	24	15 May 2016	2016	Spanish	Circuit de Barcelona-Catalunya	4	0:00.616	Red Bull Racing	TAG Heuer	RB12	
2	55	1 October 2017	2017	Malaysian	Sepang International Circuit	3	0:12.770	Red Bull Racing	TAG Heuer	RB13	
3	58	29 October 2017	2017	Mexican	Autódromo Hermanos Rodríguez	2	0:19.678	Red Bull Racing	TAG Heuer	RB13	
4	69	1 July 2018	2018	Austrian	Red Bull Ring	5	0:01.504	Red Bull Racing	TAG Heuer	RB14	
5	79	28 October 2018	2018	Mexican	Autódromo Hermanos Rodríguez	2	0:17.316	Red Bull Racing	TAG Heuer	RB14	
6	90	30 June 2019	2019	Austrian	Red Bull Ring	3	0:02.724	Red Bull Racing	Honda	RB15	
7	92	28 July 2019	2019	German	Hockenheimring	2	0:07.333	Red Bull Racing	Honda	RB15	
8	101	17 November 2019	2019	Brazilian	Interlagos Circuit	1	0:06.077	Red Bull Racing	Honda	RB15	
9	107	9 August 2020	2020	70th Anniversary	Silverstone Circuit	4	0:11.326	Red Bull Racing	Honda	RB16	
10	119	13 December 2020	2020	Abu Dhabi	Yas Marina Circuit	1	0:15.976	Red Bull Racing	Honda	RB16	
11	121	18 April 2021	2021^{†}	Emilia Romagna	Imola Circuit	3	0:22.000	Red Bull Racing	Honda	RB16B	
12	124	23 May 2021	2021^{†}	Monaco	Circuit de Monaco	2	0:08.968	Red Bull Racing	Honda	RB16B	
13	126	20 June 2021	2021^{†}	French	Circuit Paul Ricard	1	0:02.904	Red Bull Racing	Honda	RB16B	
14	127	27 June 2021	2021^{†}	Styrian	Red Bull Ring	1	0:35.743	Red Bull Racing	Honda	RB16B	
15	128	4 July 2021	2021^{†}	Austrian	Red Bull Ring	1	0:17.973	Red Bull Racing	Honda	RB16B	
16	131	29 August 2021	2021^{†}	Belgian	Circuit de Spa-Francorchamps	1	0:01.995	Red Bull Racing	Honda	RB16B	
17	132	5 September 2021	2021^{†}	Dutch	Circuit Zandvoort	1	0:20.932	Red Bull Racing	Honda	RB16B	
18	136	24 October 2021	2021^{†}	United States	Circuit of the Americas	1	0:01.333	Red Bull Racing	Honda	RB16B	
19	137	7 November 2021	2021^{†}	Mexico City	Autódromo Hermanos Rodríguez	3	0:16.555	Red Bull Racing	Honda	RB16B	
20	141	12 December 2021	2021^{†}	Abu Dhabi	Yas Marina Circuit	1	0:02.256	Red Bull Racing	Honda	RB16B	
21	143	27 March 2022	2022^{†}	Saudi Arabian	Jeddah Corniche Circuit	4	0:00.549	Red Bull Racing	RBPT	RB18	
22	145	24 April 2022	2022^{†}	Emilia Romagna	Imola Circuit	1	0:02.975	Red Bull Racing	RBPT	RB18	
23	146	8 May 2022	2022^{†}	Miami	Miami International Autodrome	3	0:03.786	Red Bull Racing	RBPT	RB18	
24	147	22 May 2022	2022^{†}	Spanish	Circuit de Barcelona-Catalunya	2	0:13.072	Red Bull Racing	RBPT	RB18	
25	149	12 June 2022	2022^{†}	Azerbaijan	Baku City Circuit	3	0:20.823	Red Bull Racing	RBPT	RB18	
26	150	19 June 2022	2022^{†}	Canadian	Circuit Gilles Villeneuve	1	0:00.993	Red Bull Racing	RBPT	RB18	
27	153	24 July 2022	2022^{†}	French	Circuit Paul Ricard	2	0:10.587	Red Bull Racing	RBPT	RB18	
28	154	31 July 2022	2022^{†}	Hungarian	Hungaroring	10	0:07.834	Red Bull Racing	RBPT	RB18	
29	155	28 August 2022	2022^{†}	Belgian	Circuit de Spa-Francorchamps	1	0:17.841	Red Bull Racing	RBPT	RB18	
30	156	4 September 2022	2022^{†}	Dutch	Circuit Zandvoort	1	0:04.071	Red Bull Racing	RBPT	RB18	
31	157	11 September 2022	2022^{†}	Italian	Monza Circuit	2	0:02.446	Red Bull Racing	RBPT	RB18	
32	159	9 October 2022	2022^{†}	Japanese	Suzuka Circuit	1	0:27.066	Red Bull Racing	RBPT	RB18	
33	160	23 October 2022	2022^{†}	United States	Circuit of the Americas	3	0:05.023	Red Bull Racing	RBPT	RB18	
34	161	30 October 2022	2022^{†}	Mexico City	Autódromo Hermanos Rodríguez	1	0:15.186	Red Bull Racing	RBPT	RB18	
35	163	20 November 2022	2022^{†}	Abu Dhabi	Yas Marina Circuit	1	0:08.771	Red Bull Racing	RBPT	RB18	
36	164	5 March 2023	2023^{†}	Bahrain	Bahrain International Circuit	1	0:11.987	Red Bull Racing	Honda RBPT	RB19	
37	166	2 April 2023	2023^{†}	Australian	Albert Park Circuit	1	0:00.179	Red Bull Racing	Honda RBPT	RB19	
38	168	7 May 2023	2023^{†}	Miami	Miami International Autodrome	9	0:05.384	Red Bull Racing	Honda RBPT	RB19	
39	169	28 May 2023	2023^{†}	Monaco	Circuit de Monaco	1	0:27.921	Red Bull Racing	Honda RBPT	RB19	
40	170	4 June 2023	2023^{†}	Spanish	Circuit de Barcelona-Catalunya	1	0:24.090	Red Bull Racing	Honda RBPT	RB19	
41	171	18 June 2023	2023^{†}	Canadian	Circuit Gilles Villeneuve	1	0:09.570	Red Bull Racing	Honda RBPT	RB19	
42	172	2 July 2023	2023^{†}	Austrian	Red Bull Ring	1	0:05.155	Red Bull Racing	Honda RBPT	RB19	
43	173	9 July 2023	2023^{†}	British	Silverstone Circuit	1	0:03.798	Red Bull Racing	Honda RBPT	RB19	
44	174	23 July 2023	2023^{†}	Hungarian	Hungaroring	2	0:33.731	Red Bull Racing	Honda RBPT	RB19	
45	175	30 July 2023	2023^{†}	Belgian	Circuit de Spa-Francorchamps	6	0:22.305	Red Bull Racing	Honda RBPT	RB19	
46	176	27 August 2023	2023^{†}	Dutch	Circuit Zandvoort	1	0:03.744	Red Bull Racing	Honda RBPT	RB19	
47	177	3 September 2023	2023^{†}	Italian	Monza Circuit	2	0:06.064	Red Bull Racing	Honda RBPT	RB19	
48	179	24 September 2023	2023^{†}	Japanese	Suzuka Circuit	1	0:19.387	Red Bull Racing	Honda RBPT	RB19	
49	180	8 October 2023	2023^{†}	Qatar	Lusail International Circuit	1	0:04.833	Red Bull Racing	Honda RBPT	RB19	
50	181	22 October 2023	2023^{†}	United States	Circuit of the Americas	6	0:10.730	Red Bull Racing	Honda RBPT	RB19	
51	182	29 October 2023	2023^{†}	Mexico City	Autódromo Hermanos Rodríguez	3	0:13.875	Red Bull Racing	Honda RBPT	RB19	
52	183	5 November 2023	2023^{†}	São Paulo	Interlagos Circuit	1	0:08.277	Red Bull Racing	Honda RBPT	RB19	
53	184	18 November 2023	2023^{†}	Las Vegas	Las Vegas Strip Circuit	3	0:02.070	Red Bull Racing	Honda RBPT	RB19	
54	185	26 November 2023	2023^{†}	Abu Dhabi	Yas Marina Circuit	1	0:17.993	Red Bull Racing	Honda RBPT	RB19	
55	186	2 March 2024	2024^{†}	Bahrain	Bahrain International Circuit	1	0:22.457	Red Bull Racing	Honda RBPT	RB20	
56	187	9 March 2024	2024^{†}	Saudi Arabian	Jeddah Corniche Circuit	1	0:13.643	Red Bull Racing	Honda RBPT	RB20	
57	189	7 April 2024	2024^{†}	Japanese	Suzuka Circuit	1	0:12.535	Red Bull Racing	Honda RBPT	RB20	
58	190	21 April 2024	2024^{†}	Chinese	Shanghai International Circuit	1	0:13.773	Red Bull Racing	Honda RBPT	RB20	
59	192	19 May 2024	2024^{†}	Emilia Romagna	Imola Circuit	1	0:00.725	Red Bull Racing	Honda RBPT	RB20	
60	194	9 June 2024	2024^{†}	Canadian	Circuit Gilles Villeneuve	2	0:03.869	Red Bull Racing	Honda RBPT	RB20	
61	195	23 June 2024	2024^{†}	Spanish	Circuit de Barcelona-Catalunya	2	0:02.219	Red Bull Racing	Honda RBPT	RB20	
62	206	3 November 2024	2024^{†}	São Paulo	Interlagos Circuit	17	0:19.477	Red Bull Racing	Honda RBPT	RB20	
63	208	1 December 2024	2024^{†}	Qatar	Lusail International Circuit	2	0:06.031	Red Bull Racing	Honda RBPT	RB20	
64	212	6 April 2025	2025	Japanese	Suzuka Circuit	1	0:01.423	Red Bull Racing	Honda RBPT	RB21	
65	216	18 May 2025	2025	Emilia Romagna	Imola Circuit	2	0:06.109	Red Bull Racing	Honda RBPT	RB21	
66	225	7 September 2025	2025	Italian	Monza Circuit	1	0:19.207	Red Bull Racing	Honda RBPT	RB21	
67	226	21 September 2025	2025	Azerbaijan	Baku City Circuit	1	0:14.609	Red Bull Racing	Honda RBPT	RB21	
68	228	19 October 2025	2025	United States	Circuit of the Americas	1	0:07.959	Red Bull Racing	Honda RBPT	RB21	
69	231	22 November 2025	2025	Las Vegas	Las Vegas Strip Circuit	2	0:23.546	Red Bull Racing	Honda RBPT	RB21	
70	232	30 November 2025	2025	Qatar	Lusail International Circuit	3	0:07.995	Red Bull Racing	Honda RBPT	RB21	
71	233	7 December 2025	2025	Abu Dhabi	Yas Marina Circuit	1	0:12.594	Red Bull Racing	Honda RBPT	RB21	
72	249	4 October 2026	2026	Bahrain	Sepang International Circuit	1	0:02.307	Red Bull Racing	Red Bull Ford	RB22	
73	250	11 October 2026	2026	Singapore	Marina Bay Street Circuit	1	0:07.335	Red Bull Racing	Red Bull Ford	RB22	
74	252	1 November 2026	2026	Mexico City	Autódromo Hermanos Rodríguez	5	0:00.799	Red Bull Racing	Red Bull Ford	RB22	
75	254	22 November 2026	2026	Las Vegas	Las Vegas Strip Circuit	1	0:00.639	Red Bull Racing	Red Bull Ford	RB22	

=== Podiums ===
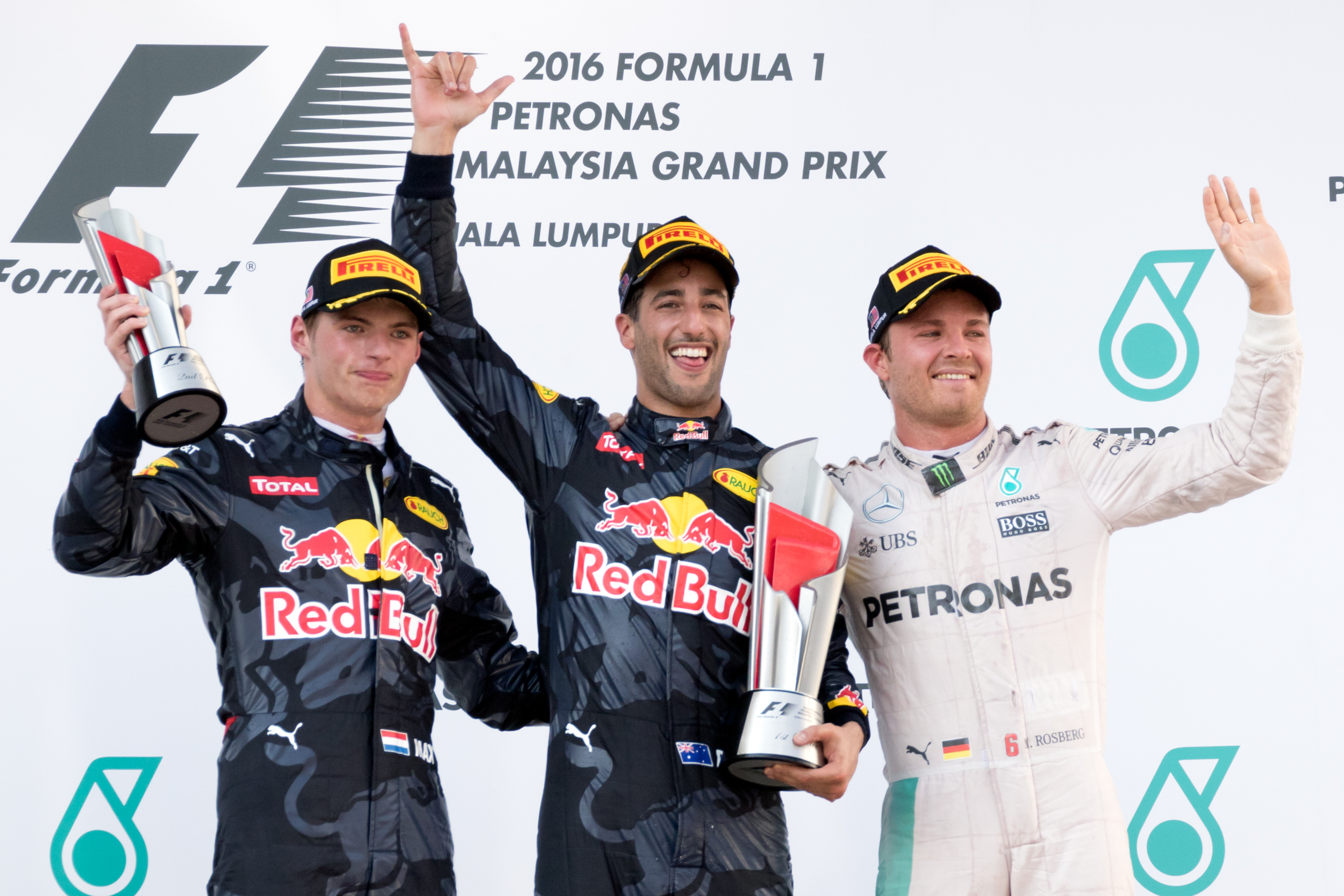
Verstappen finished 2nd in the 2016 Malaysian Grand Prix

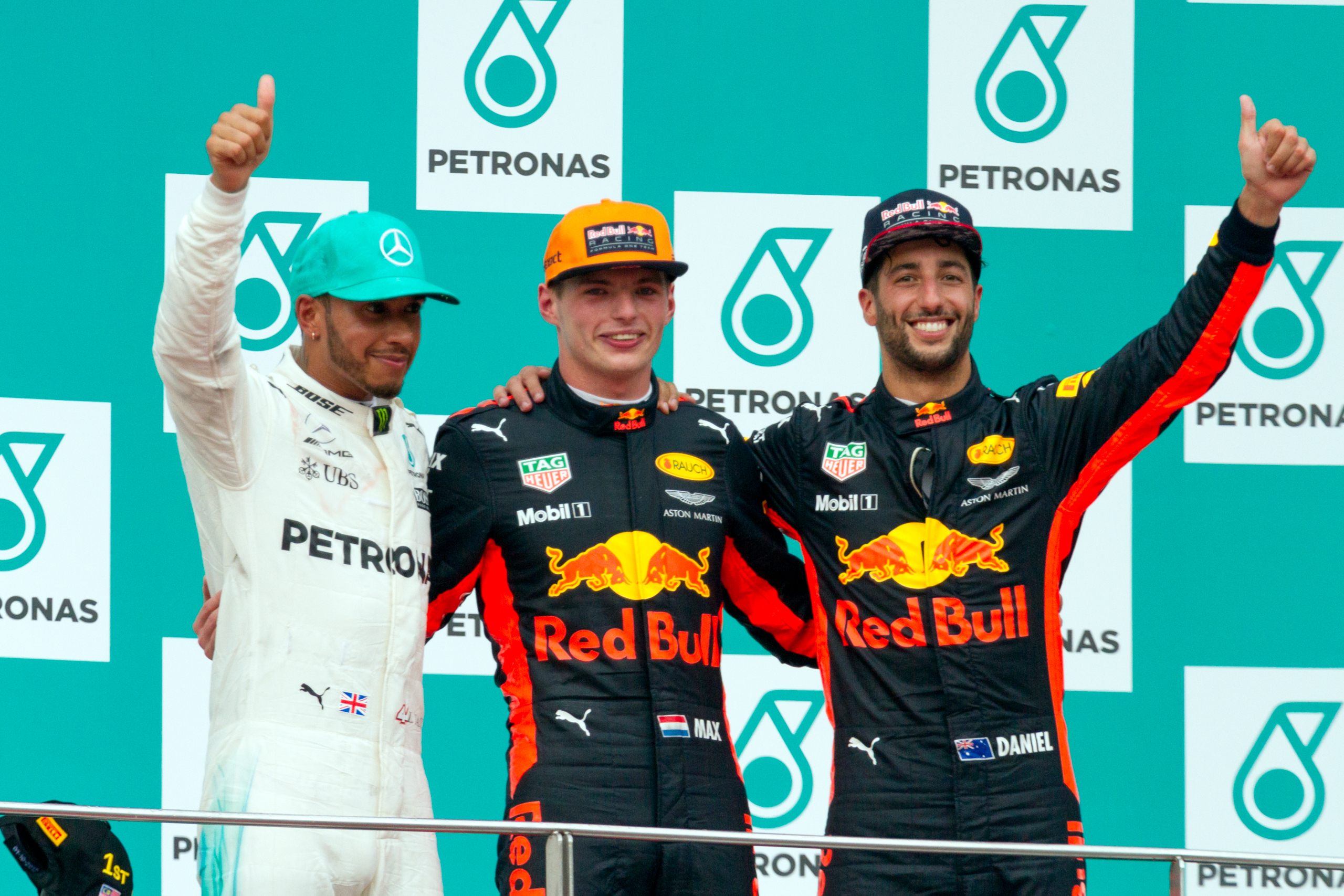
Verstappen finished 1st in the 2017 Malaysian Grand Prix

No.	Season	Grand Prix	Circuit	Grid	Final	Constructor	Engine	Ref.
1	2016	Spanish	Circuit de Barcelona-Catalunya	4	1	Red Bull Racing	TAG Heuer	
2	2016	Austrian	Red Bull Ring	9	2	Red Bull Racing	TAG Heuer	
3	2016	British	Silverstone Circuit	3	2	Red Bull Racing	TAG Heuer	
4	2016	German	Hockenheimring	4	3	Red Bull Racing	TAG Heuer	
5	2016	Malaysian	Sepang International Circuit	3	2	Red Bull Racing	TAG Heuer	
6	2016	Japanese	Suzuka Circuit	5	2	Red Bull Racing	TAG Heuer	
7	2016	Brazilian	Interlagos Circuit	4	3	Red Bull Racing	TAG Heuer	
8	2017	Chinese	Shanghai International Circuit	16	3	Red Bull Racing	TAG Heuer	
9	2017	Malaysian	Sepang International Circuit	2	1	Red Bull Racing	TAG Heuer	
10	2017	Japanese	Suzuka Circuit	5	2	Red Bull Racing	TAG Heuer	
11	2017	Mexican	Autódromo Hermanos Rodríguez	2	1	Red Bull Racing	TAG Heuer	
12	2018	Spanish	Circuit de Barcelona-Catalunya	5	3	Red Bull Racing	TAG Heuer	
13	2018	Canadian	Circuit Gilles Villeneuve	3	3	Red Bull Racing	TAG Heuer	
14	2018	French	Circuit Paul Ricard	4	2	Red Bull Racing	TAG Heuer	
15	2018	Austrian	Red Bull Ring	5	1	Red Bull Racing	TAG Heuer	
16	2018	Belgian	Circuit de Spa-Francorchamps	7	3	Red Bull Racing	TAG Heuer	
17	2018	Singapore	Marina Bay Street Circuit	2	2	Red Bull Racing	TAG Heuer	
18	2018	Japanese	Suzuka Circuit	3	3	Red Bull Racing	TAG Heuer	
19	2018	United States	Circuit of the Americas	18	2	Red Bull Racing	TAG Heuer	
20	2018	Mexican	Autódromo Hermanos Rodríguez	2	1	Red Bull Racing	TAG Heuer	
21	2018	Brazilian	Interlagos Circuit	5	2	Red Bull Racing	TAG Heuer	
22	2018	Abu Dhabi	Yas Marina Circuit	6	3	Red Bull Racing	TAG Heuer	
23	2019	Australian	Albert Park Circuit	4	3	Red Bull Racing	Honda	
24	2019	Spanish	Circuit de Barcelona-Catalunya	4	3	Red Bull Racing	Honda	
25	2019	Austrian	Red Bull Ring	2	1	Red Bull Racing	Honda	
26	2019	German	Hockenheimring	2	1	Red Bull Racing	Honda	
27	2019	Hungarian	Hungaroring	1	2	Red Bull Racing	Honda	
28	2019	Singapore	Marina Bay Street Circuit	4	3	Red Bull Racing	Honda	
29	2019	United States	Circuit of the Americas	3	3	Red Bull Racing	Honda	
30	2019	Brazilian	Interlagos Circuit	1	1	Red Bull Racing	Honda	
31	2019	Abu Dhabi	Yas Marina Circuit	2	2	Red Bull Racing	Honda	
32	2020	Styrian	Red Bull Ring	2	3	Red Bull Racing	Honda	
33	2020	Hungarian	Hungaroring	7	2	Red Bull Racing	Honda	
34	2020	British	Silverstone Circuit	3	2	Red Bull Racing	Honda	
35	2020	70th Anniversary	Silverstone Circuit	4	1	Red Bull Racing	Honda	
36	2020	Spanish	Circuit de Barcelona-Catalunya	3	2	Red Bull Racing	Honda	
37	2020	Belgian	Circuit de Spa-Francorchamps	3	3	Red Bull Racing	Honda	
38	2020	Russian	Sochi Autodrom	2	2	Red Bull Racing	Honda	
39	2020	Eifel	Nürburgring	3	2	Red Bull Racing	Honda	
40	2020	Portuguese	Algarve International Circuit	3	3	Red Bull Racing	Honda	
41	2020	Bahrain	Bahrain International Circuit	3	2	Red Bull Racing	Honda	
42	2020	Abu Dhabi	Yas Marina Circuit	1	1	Red Bull Racing	Honda	
43	2021	Bahrain	Bahrain International Circuit	1	2	Red Bull Racing	Honda	
44	2021	Emilia Romagna	Imola Circuit	3	1	Red Bull Racing	Honda	
45	2021	Portuguese	Algarve International Circuit	3	2	Red Bull Racing	Honda	
46	2021	Spanish	Circuit de Barcelona-Catalunya	2	2	Red Bull Racing	Honda	
47	2021	Monaco	Circuit de Monaco	2	1	Red Bull Racing	Honda	
48	2021	French	Circuit Paul Ricard	1	1	Red Bull Racing	Honda	
49	2021	Styrian	Red Bull Ring	1	1	Red Bull Racing	Honda	
50	2021	Austrian	Red Bull Ring	1	1	Red Bull Racing	Honda	
51	2021	Belgian	Circuit de Spa-Francorchamps	1	1	Red Bull Racing	Honda	
52	2021	Dutch	Circuit Zandvoort	1	1	Red Bull Racing	Honda	
53	2021	Russian	Sochi Autodrom	20	2	Red Bull Racing	Honda	
54	2021	Turkish	Istanbul Park	3	2	Red Bull Racing	Honda	
55	2021	United States	Istanbul Park	1	1	Red Bull Racing	Honda	
56	2021	Mexico City	Autódromo Hermanos Rodríguez	3	1	Red Bull Racing	Honda	
57	2021	São Paulo	Interlagos Circuit	2	2	Red Bull Racing	Honda	
58	2021	Qatar	Lusail International Circuit	7	2	Red Bull Racing	Honda	
59	2021	Saudi Arabian	Jeddah Corniche Circuit	3	2	Red Bull Racing	Honda	
60	2021	Abu Dhabi	Yas Marina Circuit	1	1	Red Bull Racing	Honda	
61	2022	Saudi Arabian	Jeddah Corniche Circuit	4	1	Red Bull Racing	RBPT	
62	2022	Emilia Romagna	Imola Circuit	1	1	Red Bull Racing	RBPT	
63	2022	Miami	Miami International Autodrome	3	1	Red Bull Racing	RBPT	
64	2022	Spanish	Circuit de Barcelona-Catalunya	2	1	Red Bull Racing	RBPT	
65	2022	Monaco	Circuit de Monaco	4	3	Red Bull Racing	RBPT	
66	2022	Azerbaijan	Baku City Circuit	3	1	Red Bull Racing	RBPT	
67	2022	Canadian	Circuit Gilles Villeneuve	1	1	Red Bull Racing	RBPT	
68	2022	Austrian	Red Bull Ring	1	2	Red Bull Racing	RBPT	
69	2022	French	Circuit Paul Ricard	2	1	Red Bull Racing	RBPT	
70	2022	Hungarian	Hungaroring	10	1	Red Bull Racing	RBPT	
71	2022	Belgian	Circuit de Spa-Francorchamps	1	1	Red Bull Racing	RBPT	
72	2022	Dutch	Circuit Zandvoort	1	1	Red Bull Racing	RBPT	
73	2022	Italian	Monza Circuit	2	1	Red Bull Racing	RBPT	
74	2022	Japanese	Suzuka Circuit	1	1	Red Bull Racing	RBPT	
75	2022	United States	Circuit of the Americas	3	1	Red Bull Racing	RBPT	
76	2022	Mexico City	Autódromo Hermanos Rodríguez	1	1	Red Bull Racing	RBPT	
77	2022	Abu Dhabi	Yas Marina Circuit	1	1	Red Bull Racing	RBPT	
78	2023	Bahrain	Bahrain International Circuit	1	1	Red Bull Racing	Honda RBPT	
79	2023	Saudi Arabian	Jeddah Corniche Circuit	15	2	Red Bull Racing	Honda RBPT	
80	2023	Australian	Albert Park Circuit	1	1	Red Bull Racing	Honda RBPT	
81	2023	Azerbaijan	Baku City Circuit	2	2	Red Bull Racing	Honda RBPT	
82	2023	Miami	Miami International Autodrome	9	1	Red Bull Racing	Honda RBPT	
83	2023	Monaco	Circuit de Monaco	1	1	Red Bull Racing	Honda RBPT	
84	2023	Spanish	Circuit de Barcelona-Catalunya	1	1	Red Bull Racing	Honda RBPT	
85	2023	Canadian	Circuit Gilles Villeneuve	1	1	Red Bull Racing	Honda RBPT	
86	2023	Austrian	Red Bull Ring	1	1	Red Bull Racing	Honda RBPT	
87	2023	British	Silverstone Circuit	1	1	Red Bull Racing	Honda RBPT	
88	2023	Hungarian	Hungaroring	2	1	Red Bull Racing	Honda RBPT	
89	2023	Belgian	Circuit de Spa-Francorchamps	6	1	Red Bull Racing	Honda RBPT	
90	2023	Dutch	Circuit Zandvoort	1	1	Red Bull Racing	Honda RBPT	
91	2023	Italian	Monza Circuit	2	1	Red Bull Racing	Honda RBPT	
92	2023	Japanese	Suzuka Circuit	1	1	Red Bull Racing	Honda RBPT	
93	2023	Qatar	Lusail International Circuit	1	1	Red Bull Racing	Honda RBPT	
94	2023	United States	Circuit of the Americas	6	1	Red Bull Racing	Honda RBPT	
95	2023	Mexico City	Autódromo Hermanos Rodríguez	3	1	Red Bull Racing	Honda RBPT	
96	2023	São Paulo	Interlagos Circuit	1	1	Red Bull Racing	Honda RBPT	
97	2023	Las Vegas	Las Vegas Strip Circuit	2	1	Red Bull Racing	Honda RBPT	
98	2023	Abu Dhabi	Yas Marina Circuit	1	1	Red Bull Racing	Honda RBPT	
99	2024	Bahrain	Bahrain International Circuit	1	1	Red Bull Racing	Honda RBPT	
100	2024	Saudi Arabian	Jeddah Corniche Circuit	1	1	Red Bull Racing	Honda RBPT	
101	2024	Japanese	Suzuka Circuit	1	1	Red Bull Racing	Honda RBPT	
102	2024	Chinese	Shanghai International Circuit	1	1	Red Bull Racing	Honda RBPT	
103	2024	Miami	Miami International Autodrome	1	2	Red Bull Racing	Honda RBPT	
104	2024	Emilia Romagna	Imola Circuit	1	1	Red Bull Racing	Honda RBPT	
105	2024	Canadian	Circuit Gilles Villeneuve	2	1	Red Bull Racing	Honda RBPT	
106	2024	Spanish	Circuit de Barcelona-Catalunya	2	1	Red Bull Racing	Honda RBPT	
107	2024	British	Silverstone Circuit	4	2	Red Bull Racing	Honda RBPT	
108	2024	Dutch	Circuit Zandvoort	2	2	Red Bull Racing	Honda RBPT	
109	2024	Singapore	Marina Bay Street Circuit	2	2	Red Bull Racing	Honda RBPT	
110	2024	United States	Circuit of the Americas	2	3	Red Bull Racing	Honda RBPT	
111	2024	São Paulo	Interlagos Circuit	17	1	Red Bull Racing	Honda RBPT	
112	2024	Qatar	Lusail International Circuit	2	1	Red Bull Racing	Honda RBPT	
113	2025	Australian	Albert Park Circuit	3	2	Red Bull Racing	Honda RBPT	
114	2025	Japanese	Suzuka Circuit	1	1	Red Bull Racing	Honda RBPT	
115	2025	Saudi Arabian	Jeddah Corniche Circuit	1	2	Red Bull Racing	Honda RBPT	
116	2025	Emilia Romagna	Imola Circuit	2	1	Red Bull Racing	Honda RBPT	
117	2025	Canadian	Circuit Gilles Villeneuve	2	2	Red Bull Racing	Honda RBPT	
118	2025	Dutch	Circuit Zandvoort	3	2	Red Bull Racing	Honda RBPT	
119	2025	Italian	Monza Circuit	1	1	Red Bull Racing	Honda RBPT	
120	2025	Azerbaijan	Baku City Circuit	1	1	Red Bull Racing	Honda RBPT	
121	2025	Singapore	Marina Bay Street Circuit	2	2	Red Bull Racing	Honda RBPT	
122	2025	United States	Circuit of the Americas	1	1	Red Bull Racing	Honda RBPT	
123	2025	Mexico City	Autódromo Hermanos Rodríguez	5	3	Red Bull Racing	Honda RBPT	
124	2025	São Paulo	Interlagos Circuit	PL	3	Red Bull Racing	Honda RBPT	
125	2025	Las Vegas	Las Vegas Strip Circuit	2	1	Red Bull Racing	Honda RBPT	
126	2025	Qatar	Lusail International Circuit	3	1	Red Bull Racing	Honda RBPT	
127	2025	Abu Dhabi	Yas Marina Circuit	1	1	Red Bull Racing	Honda RBPT	
128	2026	Canadian	Circuit Gilles Villeneuve	6	3	Red Bull Racing	Red Bull Ford	
129	2026	Austrian	Red Bull Ring	5	2	Red Bull Racing	Red Bull Ford	
130	2026	Belgian	Circuit de Spa-Francorchamps	2	3	Red Bull Racing	Red Bull Ford	
131	2026	Hungarian	Hungaroring	4	2	Red Bull Racing	Red Bull Ford	
132	2026	Italian	Monza Circuit	6	3	Red Bull Racing	Red Bull Ford	
133	2026	Spanish	Madring	3	2	Red Bull Racing	Red Bull Ford	
134	2026	Azerbaijan	Baku City Circuit	8	2	Red Bull Racing	Red Bull Ford	
135	2026	Bahrain	Sepang International Circuit	1	1	Red Bull Racing	Red Bull Ford	
136	2026	Singapore	Marina Bay Street Circuit	1	1	Red Bull Racing	Red Bull Ford	
137	2026	United States	Circuit of the Americas	2	3	Red Bull Racing	Red Bull Ford	
138	2026	Mexico City	Autódromo Hermanos Rodríguez	5	1	Red Bull Racing	Red Bull Ford	
139	2026	São Paulo	Autódromo José Carlos Pace	21	2	Red Bull Racing	Red Bull Ford	
140	2026	Las Vegas	Las Vegas Strip Circuit	1	1	Red Bull Racing	Red Bull Ford	

=== Pole positions ===
No.	Season	Grand Prix	Circuit	Time	Final	Constructor	Engine	Ref.
1	2019	Hungarian	Hungaroring	1:14.572	2	Red Bull Racing	Honda	
2	2019	Brazilian	Interlagos Circuit	1:07.508	1	Red Bull Racing	Honda	
3	2020	Abu Dhabi	Yas Marina Circuit	1:35.246	1	Red Bull Racing	Honda	
4	2021	Bahrain	Bahrain International Circuit	1:28.997	2	Red Bull Racing	Honda	
5	2021	French	Circuit Paul Ricard	1:29.990	1	Red Bull Racing	Honda	
6	2021	Styrian	Red Bull Ring	1:03.841	1	Red Bull Racing	Honda	
7	2021	Austrian	Red Bull Ring	1:03.720	1	Red Bull Racing	Honda	
8	2021	British	Silverstone Circuit	25:38.426 (Note: The winner of the sprint race in 2021 was officially credited with pole position for the weekend and started at the front of the grid for Sunday's main Grand Prix.)	Ret	Red Bull Racing	Honda	
9	2021	Belgian	Circuit de Spa-Francorchamps	1:59.765	1	Red Bull Racing	Honda	
10	2021	Dutch	Circuit Zandvoort	1:08.885	1	Red Bull Racing	Honda	
11	2021	Italian	Monza Circuit	27:56.403 (Note: Valtteri Bottas won the sprint, but he was required to start the race from the back of the grid for exceeding his quota of power unit elements, therefore Verstappen was awarded pole position for the Grand Prix.)	Ret	Red Bull Racing	Honda	
12	2021	United States	Circuit of the Americas	1:32.910	1	Red Bull Racing	Honda	
13	2021	Abu Dhabi	Yas Marina Circuit	1:22.109	1	Red Bull Racing	Honda	
14	2022	Emilia Romagna	Imola Circuit	1:27.999	1	Red Bull Racing	RBPT	
15	2022	Canadian	Circuit Gilles Villeneuve	1:21.299	1	Red Bull Racing	RBPT	
16	2022	Austrian	Red Bull Ring	1:04.984	2	Red Bull Racing	RBPT	
17	2022	Dutch	Circuit Zandvoort	1:10.342	1	Red Bull Racing	RBPT	
18	2022	Japanese	Suzuka Circuit	1:29.304	1	Red Bull Racing	RBPT	
19	2022	Mexico City	Autódromo Hermanos Rodríguez	1:17.775	1	Red Bull Racing	RBPT	
20	2022	Abu Dhabi	Yas Marina Circuit	1:23.824	1	Red Bull Racing	RBPT	
21	2023	Bahrain	Bahrain International Circuit	1:29.708	1	Red Bull Racing	Honda RBPT	
22	2023	Australian	Albert Park Circuit	1:16.732	1	Red Bull Racing	Honda RBPT	
23	2023	Monaco	Circuit de Monaco	1:11.365	1	Red Bull Racing	Honda RBPT	
24	2023	Spanish	Circuit de Barcelona-Catalunya	1:12.272	1	Red Bull Racing	Honda RBPT	
25	2023	Canadian	Circuit Gilles Villeneuve	1:25.858	1	Red Bull Racing	Honda RBPT	
26	2023	Austrian	Red Bull Ring	1:04.391	1	Red Bull Racing	Honda RBPT	
27	2023	British	Silverstone Circuit	1:26.720	1	Red Bull Racing	Honda RBPT	
28	2023	Dutch	Circuit Zandvoort	1:10.567	1	Red Bull Racing	Honda RBPT	
29	2023	Japanese	Suzuka Circuit	1:28.877	1	Red Bull Racing	Honda RBPT	
30	2023	Qatar	Lusail International Circuit	1:23.778	1	Red Bull Racing	Honda RBPT	
31	2023	São Paulo	Interlagos Circuit	1:10.727	1	Red Bull Racing	Honda RBPT	
32	2023	Abu Dhabi	Yas Marina Circuit	1:23.445	1	Red Bull Racing	Honda RBPT	
33	2024	Bahrain	Bahrain International Circuit	1:29.179	1	Red Bull Racing	Honda RBPT	
34	2024	Saudi Arabian	Jeddah Corniche Circuit	1:27.472	1	Red Bull Racing	Honda RBPT	
35	2024	Australian	Albert Park Circuit	1:15.915	Ret	Red Bull Racing	Honda RBPT	
36	2024	Japanese	Suzuka Circuit	1:28.197	1	Red Bull Racing	Honda RBPT	
37	2024	Chinese	Shanghai International Circuit	1:33.660	1	Red Bull Racing	Honda RBPT	
38	2024	Miami	Miami International Autodrome	1:27.241	2	Red Bull Racing	Honda RBPT	
39	2024	Emilia Romagna	Imola Circuit	1:14.746	1	Red Bull Racing	Honda RBPT	
40	2024	Austrian	Red Bull Ring	1:04.314	5	Red Bull Racing	Honda RBPT	
41	2025	Japanese	Suzuka Circuit	1:26.983	1	Red Bull Racing	Honda RBPT	
42	2025	Saudi Arabian	Jeddah Corniche Circuit	1:27.294	2	Red Bull Racing	Honda RBPT	
43	2025	Miami	Miami International Autodrome	1:26.204	4	Red Bull Racing	Honda RBPT	
44	2025	British	Silverstone Circuit	1:24.892	5	Red Bull Racing	Honda RBPT	
45	2025	Italian	Monza Circuit	1:18.792	1	Red Bull Racing	Honda RBPT	
46	2025	Azerbaijan	Baku City Circuit	1:41.117	1	Red Bull Racing	Honda RBPT	
47	2025	United States	Circuit of the Americas	1:32.510	1	Red Bull Racing	Honda RBPT	
48	2025	Abu Dhabi	Yas Marina Circuit	1:22.207	1	Red Bull Racing	Honda RBPT	
49	2026	Bahrain	Sepang International Circuit	1:35.130	1	Red Bull Racing	Red Bull Ford	
50	2026	Singapore	Marina Bay Street Circuit	1:31.373	1	Red Bull Racing	Red Bull Ford	
51	2026	Las Vegas	Las Vegas Strip Circuit	1:34.151 (Note: Kimi Antonelli set the fastest time in qualifying, but received a five-place grid penalty for exceeding his quota of internal combustion engine components. Max Verstappen was promoted to pole position in his place.)	1	Red Bull Racing	Red Bull Ford	

=== Records ===
Record		Achieved	Ref
Age
Youngest driver to participate in a session	17 years, 3 days	2014 Japanese Grand Prix	
Youngest driver to start a race	17 years, 166 days	2015 Australian Grand Prix	
Youngest driver to score points	17 years, 180 days	2015 Malaysian Grand Prix	
Youngest driver to score a podium finish	18 years, 228 days	2016 Spanish Grand Prix	
Youngest driver to win a race	18 years, 228 days	2016 Spanish Grand Prix	
Wins
Most wins in a season	19	2023	
Highest percentage of wins in a season	86.36%	2023	
Most consecutive wins	10	2023 Miami Grand Prix – 2023 Italian Grand Prix	
Most wins before first pole position	7 (Note: Record shared with Jackie Stewart.)	2019 German Grand Prix	
Most wins from pole position in a season	12	2023	
Most wins not starting from pole position in a season	9	2022	
Most consecutive wins from pole position	18	2022 Dutch Grand Prix – 2024 Saudi Arabian Grand Prix	
Wins from most different grid slots	11	2026 Mexico City Grand Prix	
Wins from most different grid slots in a season	7	2022	
Most driver wins during seasons without a Constructors' Championship	40	2026 Mexico City Grand Prix	
Most wins in one country in a season	3	2023 Miami Grand Prix; 2023 United States Grand Prix; 2023 Las Vegas Grand Prix	
Pole positions
Most consecutive pole positions	8 (Note: Record shared with Ayrton Senna.)	2023 Abu Dhabi Grand Prix – 2024 Emilia Romagna Grand Prix	
Most consecutive pole positions from first race of season	7 (Note: Record shared with Alain Prost (1993).)	2024	
Fastest qualifying lap	264.681 km/h	2025 Italian Grand Prix	
Podium finishes
Most podium finishes in a season	21	2023	
Most consecutive top two finishes	15 (Note: Record shared with Michael Schumacher.)	2022 Abu Dhabi Grand Prix – 2023 Italian Grand Prix	
Podiums from most different grid slots	18	2026 São Paulo Grand Prix	
Points
Most points in a season	575	2023	
Highest percentage of points in a season	92.74%	2023	
Most consecutive points scored	1055	2022 Emilia Romagna Grand Prix – 2024 Saudi Arabian Grand Prix	
Highest average points per race started	14.72	2026 Las Vegas Grand Prix	
Highest average points per race started in a season	26.14	2023	
Largest points deficit overturned to become World Champion	46	2022	
Most points between first and second in the World Championship	290	2023	
Highest percentage points difference between first and second in the World Championship	50.43%	2023	
Most points in a season without winning the World Championship	421	2025	
Laps led
Most laps led in a season	1003	2023	
Highest percentage of laps led in a season	75.70%	2023	
Most races led in a season	20	2023	
Sprints
Most sprint wins	14	2026 Singapore Grand Prix sprint	
Most sprint wins in a season	4	2023, 2024	
Most sprint pole positions	11	2026 Singapore Grand Prix sprint qualifying	
Most sprint podium finishes	19	2026 Singapore Grand Prix sprint	
Most points scored in sprints	163	2026 Singapore Grand Prix sprint	
Others
Highest average speed by a winning driver in a race	250.706 km/h	2025 Italian Grand Prix	
Lowest average speed by a winning driver in a race	53.583 km/h	2022 Japanese Grand Prix	
Most pit stops by a winning driver in a race	6 (Note: Record shared with Jenson Button (2011 Canadian Grand Prix).)	2023 Dutch Grand Prix	
Most races left in a season when becoming World Champion	6 (Note: Record shared with Michael Schumacher (2002).)	2023	
Most hat-tricks in a season	6	2023	
Most consecutive seasons with a grand slam	5	2021–2025	
Most consecutive races as championship leader	63	2022 Spanish Grand Prix – 2025 Australian Grand Prix	
Most consecutive days as championship leader	1029	2022 Spanish Grand Prix – 2025 Australian Grand Prix	

Footnotes

== Awards and honours ==
=== Formula One ===
- Formula One World Drivers' Championship: 2021, 2022, 2023, 2024
- DHL Fastest Lap Award: 2022, 2023
- FIA Action of the Year: 2015, 2016, 2019, 2025
- FIA Rookie of the Year: 2015
- FIA Personality of the Year: 2015, 2016, 2017
- Lorenzo Bandini Trophy: 2016
- Overtake Award: 2025

=== Other awards ===
- Time 100: 2024
- Laureus World Sportsman of the Year: 2022
- Dutch Sportsman of the Year: 2016, 2021, 2022
- Autosport International Racing Driver Award: 2021, 2022, 2023, 2024, 2025
- Best Driver ESPY Award: 2023, 2024, 2025
- FIA Action of the Year: 2014, 2015, 2016, 2019, 2025
- Autosport Awards Rookie of the Year: 2015
- Autosport Awards Moment of the Year: 2024

=== Orders and special awards ===
- Netherlands
  - Officer of the Order of Orange-Nassau (2022)

== See also ==
- List of Formula One driver records
