= 2024 Las Vegas Grand Prix =

Twenty-second round of the 2024 F1 season

Race 22 of 24 in the 2024 Formula One World Championship
← Previous race	Next race →
- Layout of the Las Vegas Strip Circuit

Race details
- Date: November 23, 2024
- Official name: Formula 1 Heineken Silver Las Vegas Grand Prix 2024
- Location: Las Vegas Strip Circuit; Paradise, Nevada, United States
- Course: Street circuit
- Course length: 6.201 km (3.853 miles)
- Distance: 50 laps, 309.958 km (192.599 miles)
- Weather: Clear
- Attendance: 306,000

Pole position
Driver	(United Kingdom) George Russell	Mercedes
- Time: 1:32.312

Fastest lap
Driver	(United Kingdom) Lando Norris	McLaren-Mercedes
- Time: 1:34.876 on lap 50

Podium
First	(United Kingdom) George Russell	Mercedes
Second	(United Kingdom) Lewis Hamilton	Mercedes
Third	(Spain) Carlos Sainz Jr.	Ferrari

The 2024 Las Vegas Grand Prix (officially known as the Formula 1 Heineken Silver Las Vegas Grand Prix 2024) was a Formula One motor race held on November 23, 2024, at the Las Vegas Strip Circuit in Paradise, Nevada, United States. It was the twenty-second round of the 2024 Formula One World Championship.

George Russell of Mercedes took pole position for the race, which he went on to win ahead of teammate Lewis Hamilton, with Carlos Sainz Jr. of Ferrari completing the podium. Max Verstappen of Red Bull Racing finished fifth, securing his fourth consecutive World Drivers' Championship. Mercedes achieved their 60th one-two finish, their first since the 2022 São Paulo Grand Prix. The podium finish was the last for Hamilton until the 2026 Chinese Grand Prix and his last of 153 podium finishes for Mercedes.

== Background ==
The event was held at the Las Vegas Strip Circuit in Paradise, Nevada, for the second time in the circuit's history, across the weekend of November 21–23. The Grand Prix was the twenty-second round of the 2024 Formula One World Championship and the second running of the Las Vegas Grand Prix.

=== Championship standings before the race ===
Going into the weekend, Max Verstappen led the Drivers' Championship with 393 points, 62 points ahead of Lando Norris in second, and 86 ahead of Charles Leclerc in third. McLaren, holding 593 points, entered this round as the leader of the Constructors' Championship from Ferrari and Red Bull Racing, who were second and third with 557 and 544 points, respectively.

==== Championship permutations ====
World Drivers' Championship leader Max Verstappen had an opportunity to secure his fourth consecutive title at this event. At the conclusion of the Las Vegas Grand Prix, there would have been two races left in the 2024 Formula One World Championship. With the following Qatar Grand Prix featuring the sprint format, 60 points would have been available in the final two rounds of the Drivers' Championship. Lando Norris would therefore have had to outscore Verstappen by at least three points to retain a mathematical chance of winning the title. (Note: If Lando Norris had outscored Max Verstappen by two points, the best he could have done is equal Verstappen's points total. In this case, Verstappen would have won the championship, having won eight races, whereas Norris would have won at most six.)

Verstappen would have been World Champion if:

- He won the race or finished ahead of Norris.
- He finished 3rd with the fastest lap with Norris finishing 2nd or lower.
- He finished 4th with the fastest lap with Norris finishing 3rd or lower.
- He finished 5th with Norris finishing 4th (without the fastest lap) or lower.
- He finished 6th with Norris finishing 5th (without the fastest lap) or lower.
- He finished 7th with Norris finishing 6th (without the fastest lap) or lower.
- He finished 8th with Norris finishing 7th (without the fastest lap) or lower.
- He finished 9th with Norris finishing 8th (without the fastest lap) or lower.
- He finished 10th with the fastest lap with Norris finishing 8th or lower.
- Norris finished 9th (without the fastest lap) or lower.

If none of these criteria had met, Norris would have retained a mathematical chance of winning the title.

=== Entrants ===
The drivers and teams were the same as the season entry list with two exceptions: Franco Colapinto, who replaced Logan Sargeant at Williams from the Italian Grand Prix onwards, and Liam Lawson, who replaced Daniel Ricciardo at RB from the United States Grand Prix.

=== Tyre choices ===
Tyre supplier Pirelli brought the C3, C4, and C5 tyre compounds (the softest three in their range) designated hard, medium, and soft, respectively, for teams to use at the event.

== Practice ==
Three free practice sessions were held for the event. The first free practice session was held on November 21, 2024, at 18:30 local time (UTC–8), and was topped by Lewis Hamilton of Mercedes ahead of his teammate George Russell and Lando Norris of McLaren. The second free practice session was held on the same day, at 22:00 local time, and was topped by Hamilton ahead of Norris and Russell. The third practice session was held on November 22, 2024, at 18:30 local time, and was topped by Russell ahead of Oscar Piastri of McLaren and Carlos Sainz Jr. of Ferrari.

== Qualifying ==
Qualifying was held on November 22, 2024, at 22:00 local time (UTC−8).

=== Qualifying classification ===
Pos.	No.	Driver	Constructor	Qualifying times			Final grid
Pos.	No.	Driver	Constructor	Q1	Q2	Q3	Final grid
1	63	(United Kingdom) George Russell	Mercedes	1:33.186	1:32.779	1:32.312	1
2	55	(Spain) Carlos Sainz Jr.	Ferrari	1:33.484	1:32.711	1:32.410	2
3	10	(France) Pierre Gasly	Alpine-Renault	1:33.691	1:32.879	1:32.664	3
4	16	(Monaco) Charles Leclerc	Ferrari	1:33.446	1:33.016	1:32.783	4
5	1	(Netherlands) Max Verstappen	Red Bull Racing-Honda RBPT	1:33.299	1:33.085	1:32.797	5
6	4	(United Kingdom) Lando Norris	McLaren-Mercedes	1:33.592	1:33.099	1:33.008	6
7	22	(Japan) Yuki Tsunoda	RB-Honda RBPT	1:33.789	1:33.089	1:33.029	7
8	81	(Australia) Oscar Piastri	McLaren-Mercedes	1:33.450	1:33.024	1:33.033	8
9	27	(Germany) Nico Hülkenberg	Haas-Ferrari	1:33.920	1:33.114	1:33.062	9
10	44	(United Kingdom) Lewis Hamilton	Mercedes	1:33.225	1:32.567	1:48.106	10
11	31	(France) Esteban Ocon	Alpine-Renault	1:33.968	1:33.221	N/A	11
12	20	(Denmark) Kevin Magnussen	Haas-Ferrari	1:33.991	1:33.297	N/A	12
13	24	(China) Zhou Guanyu	Kick Sauber-Ferrari	1:34.079	1:33.566	N/A	13
14	43	(Argentina) Franco Colapinto	Williams-Mercedes	1:33.746	1:33.749	N/A	PL^{a}
15	30	(New Zealand) Liam Lawson	RB-Honda RBPT	1:34.087	1:34.257	N/A	14
16	11	(Mexico) Sergio Pérez	Red Bull Racing-Honda RBPT	1:34.155	N/A	N/A	15
17	14	(Spain) Fernando Alonso	Aston Martin Aramco-Mercedes	1:34.258	N/A	N/A	16
18	23	(Thailand) Alexander Albon	Williams-Mercedes	1:34.425	N/A	N/A	17
19	77	(Finland) Valtteri Bottas	Kick Sauber-Ferrari	1:34.430	N/A	N/A	19^{b}
20	18	(Canada) Lance Stroll	Aston Martin Aramco-Mercedes	1:34.484	N/A	N/A	18
107% time: 1:39.709

Notes

- ^a – Franco Colapinto qualified 14th, but was required to start the race from the pit lane as his car was modified under parc fermé conditions and additional gearbox components were used.
- ^b – Valtteri Bottas received a five-place grid penalty for a fourth energy store.

== Race ==
The race was held on November 23, 2024, at 22:00 local time (UTC−8), and was run for 50 laps.

=== Race report ===
At the start, George Russell made a clean getaway to hold the lead into turn 1. Further back, Charles Leclerc passed Carlos Sainz Jr. and Pierre Gasly for second place while Kevin Magnussen and Liam Lawson competed closely for 13th place. On lap 8, Max Verstappen passed Leclerc, whose tires were graining. The next lap, Leclerc made a pit stop for hard tyres, and rejoined in 16th. On lap 10, Sainz made a pit stop and rejoined in 12th. By lap 14, both Ferraris of Leclerc and Sainz had improved their positions to fourth and fifth, respectively. Pierre Gasly had initially lost ground and dropped off from his third-place start before his engine failed with smoke emitting from his car, forcing him to retire on lap 15. Alexander Albon, moved up to 10th place during the race before a cooling issue forced him to retire. On lap 17, Sergio Pérez was overtaken by both Ferraris, dropping to fifth. On lap 26, Verstappen and Lewis Hamilton made pit stops, and Leclerc passed them to go into second.

On lap 27, the race was led by George Russell, followed by Verstappen, Sainz, Leclerc, and Lewis Hamilton. Sainz let Leclerc by, before Ferrari instructed Sainz to pit for hard tyres. Sainz was told to stay out right before the pit stop, resulting in him skipping over the pit entry apron and rejoining the track. Sainz later stated that the delay cost him time that might have helped him stay ahead of Hamilton, who eventually passed both Sainz and Leclerc. He was not penalised for crossing the pit entry line after stewards reviewed the incident, and he rejoined the race in sixth place. On lap 30, Lando Norris made a pit stop, and Sainz moved up to fifth. The next lap Leclerc made a pit stop for another set of hard tyres, and rejoined in fifth, now behind Sainz. On lap 41, Sainz passed Verstappen for third. On lap 46, Leclerc passed Verstappen for fourth. The race ended with Russell winning, followed by Hamilton, Sainz, and Leclerc. Verstappen, in fifth, clinched his fourth consecutive title, finishing ahead of Norris. This was the third time that the drivers' title was decided in Las Vegas, with previous title-deciding races occurring in 1981 and 1982, which saw drivers' titles clinched by Nelson Piquet and Keke Rosberg, respectively.

=== Race classification ===
Pos.	No.	Driver	Constructor	Laps	Time/Retired	Grid	Points
1	63	(United Kingdom) George Russell	Mercedes	50	1:22:05.969	1	25
2	44	(United Kingdom) Lewis Hamilton	Mercedes	50	+7.313	10	18
3	55	(Spain) Carlos Sainz Jr.	Ferrari	50	+11.906	2	15
4	16	(Monaco) Charles Leclerc	Ferrari	50	+14.283	4	12
5	1	(Netherlands) Max Verstappen	Red Bull Racing-Honda RBPT	50	+16.582	5	10
6	4	(United Kingdom) Lando Norris	McLaren-Mercedes	50	+43.385	6	9^{a}
7	81	(Australia) Oscar Piastri	McLaren-Mercedes	50	+51.365	8	6
8	27	(Germany) Nico Hülkenberg	Haas-Ferrari	50	+59.808	9	4
9	22	(Japan) Yuki Tsunoda	RB-Honda RBPT	50	+1:02.808	7	2
10	11	(Mexico) Sergio Pérez	Red Bull Racing-Honda RBPT	50	+1:03.114	15	1
11	14	(Spain) Fernando Alonso	Aston Martin Aramco-Mercedes	50	+1:09.195	16	
12	20	(Denmark) Kevin Magnussen	Haas-Ferrari	50	+1:09.803	12	
13	24	(China) Zhou Guanyu	Kick Sauber-Ferrari	50	+1:14.085	13	
14	43	(Argentina) Franco Colapinto	Williams-Mercedes	50	+1:15.172	PL	
15	18	(Canada) Lance Stroll	Aston Martin Aramco-Mercedes	50	+1:24.102	18	
16	30	(New Zealand) Liam Lawson	RB-Honda RBPT	50	+1:31.005	14	
17	31	(France) Esteban Ocon	Alpine-Renault	49	+1 lap	11	
18	77	(Finland) Valtteri Bottas	Kick Sauber-Ferrari	49	+1 lap	19	
Ret	23	(Thailand) Alexander Albon	Williams-Mercedes	25	Turbo	17	
Ret	10	(France) Pierre Gasly	Alpine-Renault	15	Engine	3	
Fastest lap: (United Kingdom) Lando Norris (McLaren-Mercedes) – 1:34.876 (lap 50)

Notes

- ^a – Includes one point for fastest lap.

== Championship standings after the race ==
Drivers' Championship standings

Pos.	Driver	Points
1	(Netherlands) **Max Verstappen***	403
2	(United Kingdom) Lando Norris	340
3	(Monaco) Charles Leclerc	319
4	(Australia) Oscar Piastri	268
5	(Spain) Carlos Sainz Jr.	259

Constructors' Championship standings

Pos.	Constructor	Points
1	(United Kingdom) **McLaren-Mercedes***	608
2	(Italy) **Ferrari***	584
3	(Austria) **Red Bull Racing-Honda RBPT***	555
4	(Germany) Mercedes	425
5	(United Kingdom) Aston Martin Aramco-Mercedes	86

- Note: Only the top five positions are included for both sets of standings.
- Competitor marked in bold and with an asterisk still has a theoretical chance of becoming World Champion.

== Notes ==
Previous race: 2024 São Paulo Grand Prix	FIA Formula One World Championship; 2024 season	Next race: 2024 Qatar Grand Prix
Previous race: 2023 Las Vegas Grand Prix	Las Vegas Grand Prix	Next race: 2025 Las Vegas Grand Prix
