= Las Vegas Grand Prix =

Formula One race in Las Vegas, Nevada

- Las Vegas Strip Circuit

Race information
- Number of times held: 4
- First held: 2023
- Most wins (drivers): (Netherlands) Max Verstappen (3)
- Most wins (constructors): (Austria) Red Bull Racing (3)
- Circuit length: 6.201 km (3.853 miles)
- Race length: 309.958 km (192.599 miles)
- Laps: 50

Last race (2026)

Pole position
- (Netherlands) Max Verstappen; Red Bull Racing-Red Bull Ford; 1:34.151

Podium
- 1. (Netherlands) M. Verstappen; Red Bull Racing-Red Bull Ford; 1:27:39.624; 2. (United Kingdom) L. Norris; McLaren-Mercedes; +0.639; 3. (Australia) O. Piastri; McLaren-Mercedes; +1.529

Fastest lap
- (New Zealand) Liam Lawson; Racing Bulls-Red Bull Ford; 1:35.591

The Las Vegas Grand Prix is a motor racing event that forms part of the Formula One World Championship, taking place in Paradise, Nevada, in the United States. It is conducted as a night race on a temporary street circuit that includes parts of the Las Vegas Strip. The first race was held on November 18, 2023. Formula One and Las Vegas have signed an agreement to host the race through 2037.

== History ==
The inaugural Las Vegas Grand Prix, held on November 18, 2023, marked the first Formula One race in Las Vegas since the 1982 Caesars Palace Grand Prix and the first street race in the city since the 2007 Vegas Grand Prix in the Champ Car series. The event took place around the Las Vegas Strip on a brand-new street track. It was the third Grand Prix in the United States on the 2023 calendar after the Miami and the United States Grands Prix, and marked the first time since 1982 that there were three races held in the United States in a Formula One season.

Formula One and Las Vegas had signed an agreement until 2027 for the race, with the intent being for the race to continue into perpetuity. On June 4, 2026, it was announced that the Las Vegas Grand Prix would remain on the Formula One calendar until 2037.

== Circuit ==
The circuit was designed by Tilke GmbH, with the project led by Carsten Tilke, son of Hermann Tilke. Formula One itself purchased a piece of land to build permanent pit and paddock facilities that are used during race weekends.

With a length of 6.201 km (3.853 mi) and consisting of 17 corners, the Grand Prix lasts 50 laps, giving a race distance of 309.958 km (192.599 mi). The circuit is located next to many of the most famous casinos, including a 1.9 km (1.2 mi) straight down the Las Vegas Strip, as well as two other lengthy straight sections.

== Winners ==
=== By year ===
Year	Driver	Constructor	Report
2023	(Netherlands) Max Verstappen	Red Bull Racing-Honda RBPT	Report
2024	(United Kingdom) George Russell	Mercedes	Report
2025	(Netherlands) Max Verstappen	Red Bull Racing-Honda RBPT	Report
2026	(Netherlands) Max Verstappen	Red Bull Racing-Red Bull Ford	Report

=== Repeat winners (drivers) ===
Drivers in bold are competing in the Formula One championship in 2026.

Wins	Driver	Years won
3	**(Netherlands) Max Verstappen**	2023, 2025, 2026

=== Repeat winners (constructors) ===
Teams in bold are competing in the Formula One championship in 2026.

Wins	Constructor	Years won
3	(Austria) **Red Bull Racing**	2023, 2025, 2026

=== Repeat winners (engine manufacturers) ===
Manufacturers in bold are competing in the Formula One championship in 2026.

Wins	Manufacturer	Years won
2	(Japan) Honda RBPT	2023, 2025
