= 2026 Las Vegas Grand Prix =

Twenty-first round of the 2026 F1 season

Race 21 of 23 in the 2026 Formula One World Championship
← Previous race	Next race →
- Layout of the Las Vegas Strip Circuit

Race details
- Date: November 21, 2026
- Official name: Formula 1 Heineken Las Vegas Grand Prix 2026
- Location: Las Vegas Strip Circuit; Las Vegas, USA
- Course: Street Circuit
- Course length: 6.201 km (3.853 miles)
- Distance: 50 laps, 309.958 km (192.599 miles)
- Weather: Clear

Pole position
Driver	(Netherlands) Max Verstappen (Note: Kimi Antonelli set the fastest time in qualifying, but received a five-place grid penalty for exceeding his quota of internal combustion engine components. Max Verstappen was promoted to pole position in his place.)	Red Bull Racing-Red Bull Ford
- Time: 1:34.151

Fastest lap
Driver	(New Zealand) Liam Lawson	Racing Bulls-Red Bull Ford
- Time: 1:35.591 on lap 50

Podium
First	(Netherlands) Max Verstappen	Red Bull Racing-Red Bull Ford
Second	(United Kingdom) Lando Norris	McLaren-Mercedes
Third	(Australia) Oscar Piastri	McLaren-Mercedes

The 2026 Las Vegas Grand Prix (officially known as the Formula 1 Heineken Las Vegas Grand Prix 2026) was a Formula One motor race that was held on November 21, 2026 at the Las Vegas Strip Circuit in Las Vegas, Nevada. It was the twenty-first round of the 2026 Formula One World Championship.

Kimi Antonelli (Mercedes) finished fastest in qualifying, but could not take pole position due to a grid penalty for exceeding his engine components. Max Verstappen (Red Bull), who finished second in qualifying, was promoted to pole position as a result. An eventful race with numerous lead changes finished with Verstappen converting pole position to a win; the podium places were contested throughout the race, with the Mercedes drivers Antonelli and George Russell, Verstappen's teammate Isack Hadjar, and Pierre Gasly (Alpine) all competing for it. Ultimately, the two McLaren drivers Lando Norris and Oscar Piastri finished second and third respectively, with Piastri obtaining his first podium since the Miami Grand Prix.

A new record for overtakes was set at this Grand Prix, with 352, nearly double of the previous record set by the 2023 Dutch Grand Prix with 186 overtakes in wet conditions, with 35 alone being lead changes.

== Background ==
The event was held at the Las Vegas Strip Circuit in Paradise, Nevada, for the fourth time in the circuit's history, across the weekend of November 19–21. The Grand Prix was the twenty-first round of the 2026 Formula One World Championship and the fourth running of the Las Vegas Grand Prix.

=== Championship standings before the race ===
Going into the weekend, Kimi Antonelli, who clinched the title at the Mexico City Grand Prix, led the Drivers' Championship with 390 points, 111 points ahead of Max Verstappen in second and 128 ahead of teammate George Russell in third. Mercedes, who clinched the Constructors' Championship at the preceding São Paulo Grand Prix, were ahead of Ferrari, who were second with 510 points, and Red Bull, who were third with 415 points.

=== Entrants ===
The drivers and teams were the same as published in the season entry list with the only exception of Rafael Câmara, who again replaced Esteban Ocon at Haas. Ocon was removed from the team following a disagreement at the Mexico City Grand Prix.

During the first practice session, three teams fielded alternate drivers who had not raced in more than two Grands Prix, as required by the Formula One regulations:

- Ryo Hirakawa for Haas in place of Oliver Bearman.
- Dino Beganovic for Ferrari in place of Lewis Hamilton.
- Jak Crawford for Aston Martin in place of Fernando Alonso.

As wet conditions limited the running of the first free practice session, Hirakawa, Beganovic, and Crawford did not choose to complete an entire lap.

=== Tyre choices ===
Tyre supplier Pirelli selected the C3, C4, and C5 tyre compounds (the softest three in their range) designated hard, medium, and soft, respectively, for teams to use at the event.

== Practice ==
Three free practice sessions were held for the event. The first free practice session was held on November 19, 2026, at 16:30 local time (UTC–8). Due to rain, no driver chose to complete an entire lap and no official times were set. The second free practice session was held on the same day, at 20:00 local time, and was topped by George Russell (Mercedes) ahead of Pierre Gasly (Alpine) and Charles Leclerc (Ferrari). A red flag was observed due to debris on track. The third practice session was held on November 20, 2026, at 16:30 local time, and was topped by Russell ahead of his teammate Kimi Antonelli and Lando Norris (McLaren).

== Qualifying ==
Qualifying was held on November 20, 2026, at 20:00 local time (UTC–8), and determined the starting grid order for the race.

=== Qualifying report ===
Qualifying began with a track temperature of 15 °C (59 °F), following a rain-affected Thursday that had left teams with only one dry practice session. In the first segment (Q1), the drivers used soft tyres and completed several preparation laps to build tyre temperature. Gabriel Bortoleto (Audi) was initially delayed in the garage, while Rafael Câmara (Haas) spun at turn 1 after locking his rear brakes, but continued. George Russell (Mercedes) finished fastest ahead of teammate Kimi Antonelli, followed by Charles Leclerc (Ferrari) and Lando Norris (McLaren).

Oliver Bearman, who already faced a grid penalty, gave Haas teammate Câmara a tow on his final attempt. Câmara was eliminated in 17th, followed by Sergio Pérez (Cadillac), Fernando Alonso and Lance Stroll (Aston Martin), and Valtteri Bottas (Cadillac). Bearman's best lap was outside the 107% limit, leaving him unclassified.

Liam Lawson (Racing Bulls) and Oscar Piastri (McLaren) initially set the pace in the second segment (Q2), before Russell moved ahead. Lewis Hamilton (Ferrari) struggled for grip and ran off at turn 1; his subsequent improvement briefly placed him eighth before other drivers went faster. Max Verstappen (Red Bull) was at risk of elimination before his final lap put him fastest. He later attributed much of the improvement to a tow, estimating that following another car by four to four-and-a-half seconds had helped him gain seven to eight tenths. He placed ahead of Pierre Gasly (Alpine) and Russell, while Antonelli progressed in tenth.

Leclerc made a mistake in the middle sector on his final attempt, while Hamilton later reported that debris had damaged his floor early in qualifying, reducing downforce. Neither Ferrari reached Q3, the first time this had happened since the 2024 Canadian Grand Prix. Leclerc and Hamilton finished 11th and 12th, followed by Nico Hülkenberg (Audi), Carlos Sainz Jr. (Williams), Bortoleto and Alexander Albon (Williams).

Verstappen led after the opening attempts in the final segment (Q3), ahead of Norris, Russell and Red Bull teammate Isack Hadjar. Mercedes sent Russell out ahead of Antonelli for the final runs, despite Russell having requested to follow his teammate. Russell slowed at the start of his second preparation lap to seek a tow from cars leaving the pits, contributing to a group comprising both Mercedes, Alpines and Racing Bulls. Antonelli, at the rear of the group, crossed the line with only seconds remaining. The slipstream on the straights compensated for the disadvantage of following closely through the corners.

Verstappen did not improve on his second attempt. Antonelli's final lap secured the fastest time ahead of Verstappen. Antonelli later reported difficulty warming his tyres and excessive brake-pedal travel, but said the tow had helped him complete his final lap. Russell improved to third, ahead of Norris, Hadjar, Lindblad, Piastri, Lawson, Gasly and Franco Colapinto (Alpine). Verstappen described qualifying as his strongest session of the weekend, despite continuing to experience handling problems that he said had first appeared at the São Paulo Grand Prix.

Antonelli's five-place penalty for exceeding his allocation of power unit components moved him to sixth on the grid, giving Verstappen pole position alongside Russell, with Norris and Hadjar on the second row and Lindblad fifth. Lindblad's fifth place was his highest grid position in Formula One. Piastri's ten-place penalty dropped him from seventh to 17th, promoting Lawson, Gasly, Colapinto and Leclerc to seventh through tenth respectively. Sainz and Stroll also received ten-place penalties, placing them 20th and 21st. Bearman received a 35-place penalty and was placed 22nd after the stewards granted him permission to race despite failing to meet the 107% requirement.

=== Qualifying classification ===
Pos.	No.	Driver	Constructor	Qualifying times			Final grid
Pos.	No.	Driver	Constructor	Q1	Q2	Q3	Final grid
1	12	(Italy) Kimi Antonelli	Mercedes	1:34.684	1:35.086	1:33.893	6^{a}
2	3	(Netherlands) Max Verstappen	Red Bull Racing-Red Bull Ford	1:35.264	1:34.394	1:34.151	1
3	63	(United Kingdom) George Russell	Mercedes	1:34.664	1:34.617	1:34.224	2
4	1	(United Kingdom) Lando Norris	McLaren-Mercedes	1:35.109	1:34.766	1:34.244	3
5	6	(France) Isack Hadjar	Red Bull Racing-Red Bull Ford	1:35.413	1:35.064	1:34.592	4
6	41	(United Kingdom) Arvid Lindblad	Racing Bulls-Red Bull Ford	1:35.456	1:34.963	1:34.668	5
7	81	(Australia) Oscar Piastri	McLaren-Mercedes	1:35.491	1:34.763	1:34.899	17^{b}
8	30	(New Zealand) Liam Lawson	Racing Bulls-Red Bull Ford	1:35.489	1:35.048	1:35.090	7
9	10	(France) Pierre Gasly	Alpine-Mercedes	1:35.718	1:34.559	1:35.105	8
10	43	(Argentina) Franco Colapinto	Alpine-Mercedes	1:35.930	1:34.982	1:35.314	9
11	16	(Monaco) Charles Leclerc	Ferrari	1:35.040	1:35.197	N/A	10
12	44	(United Kingdom) Lewis Hamilton	Ferrari	1:35.743	1:35.253	N/A	11
13	27	(Germany) Nico Hülkenberg	Audi	1:35.710	1:35.460	N/A	12
14	55	(Spain) Carlos Sainz Jr.	Atlassian Williams-Mercedes	1:35.588	1:35.641	N/A	20^{c}
15	5	(Brazil) Gabriel Bortoleto	Audi	1:36.149	1:35.993	N/A	13
16	23	(Thailand) Alexander Albon	Atlassian Williams-Mercedes	1:35.856	1:36.125	N/A	14
17	51	(Brazil) Rafael Câmara	Haas-Ferrari	1:36.220	N/A	N/A	15
18	11	(Mexico) Sergio Pérez	Cadillac-Ferrari	1:37.383	N/A	N/A	16
19	14	(Spain) Fernando Alonso	Aston Martin Aramco-Honda	1:37.400	N/A	N/A	18
20	18	(Canada) Lance Stroll	Aston Martin Aramco-Honda	1:37.550	N/A	N/A	21^{d}
21	77	(Finland) Valtteri Bottas	Cadillac-Ferrari	1:37.601	N/A	N/A	19
107% time: 1:41.290
—	87	(United Kingdom) Oliver Bearman	Haas-Ferrari	1:48.005	N/A	N/A	22^{e}

Notes

- ^a – Kimi Antonelli received a five-place grid penalty for exceeding his quota of power unit elements.
- ^b – Oscar Piastri received a ten-place grid penalty for exceeding his quota of power unit elements.
- ^c – Carlos Sainz Jr. received a ten-place grid penalty for exceeding his quota of power unit elements.
- ^d – Lance Stroll received a ten-place grid penalty for exceeding his quota of power unit elements.
- ^e – Oliver Bearman received a 35-place grid penalty for exceeding his quota of power unit elements. He failed to set a time within the 107% requirement and was allowed to race at the stewards' discretion.

== Race ==
The race was held on November 21, 2026, at 20:00 local time (UTC–8), and was ran for 50 laps.

=== Race report ===
==== Pre-race ====
The 50-lap race took place in cool conditions. Max Verstappen (Red Bull) started from pole position after Kimi Antonelli (Mercedes), who had set the fastest qualifying time, received a five-place grid penalty for exceeding his allocation of power unit components. Antonelli started sixth, while Oscar Piastri (McLaren) started 17th following a ten-place grid penalty. Before the formation lap, Alexander Albon (Williams) was removed from the grid with overheating brakes and did not start, leaving his 14th-place grid slot vacant. Liam Lawson (Racing Bulls) started from the pit lane after repairs to a fuel leak, leaving another vacant slot in seventh. Most drivers selected soft tyres for the start; Antonelli, Lawson and Oliver Bearman (Haas) chose mediums.

==== Opening laps ====
Verstappen retained the lead at the start, followed by George Russell (Mercedes) and Lando Norris (McLaren). Isack Hadjar (Red Bull) passed Norris during the opening lap, while Antonelli lost two places to the Alpine drivers and fell to eighth. Russell briefly took the lead on lap two, but Verstappen immediately repassed him. Hadjar subsequently overtook Russell, while Arvid Lindblad (Racing Bulls) passed Norris and Russell to run briefly in third. Hadjar also challenged Verstappen, asking the team to tell Verstappen not to defend against him so that they could avoid losing time. By lap 10, the first ten cars were within four seconds of one another. A pause in the battle among Verstappen, Russell, Hadjar, Pierre Gasly (Alpine) and Antonelli allowed the leading five to pull clear of the following cars around lap 15. Norris dropped as low as 11th. Ferrari teammates Lewis Hamilton and Charles Leclerc also battled each other, while Hamilton received a ten-second time penalty for leaving the track and gaining an advantage against Norris.

==== Safety car and pit stops ====
A collision between Sergio Pérez (Cadillac) and Rafael Câmara (Haas) at turn 14 prompted the deployment of the safety car on lap 19. Pérez retired after hitting the barrier, while Câmara continued. Most drivers pitted, with Red Bull servicing both cars in succession and Russell moving ahead of Hadjar. Hamilton stayed out for another lap to avoid delaying Leclerc while serving his penalty, then stopped and rejoined in 14th. Lindblad also retired during the safety car period after spinning while attempting to warm his tyres. He later attributed the spin to applying the throttle during the tyre-warming procedure. Lawson was allowed to unlap himself before racing resumed.

Racing resumed on lap 26. Hadjar's front wing failed shortly afterwards, forcing an additional pit stop and removing him from the leading group. Antonelli, who had switched from mediums to softs, continued on the opposite tyre strategy to his principal rivals. Gasly briefly inherited third before Norris overtook him on lap 31. Hamilton returned to the top ten within one lap of the restart.

==== Renewed lead battle and Ferrari collision ====
Norris passed Russell and Verstappen in succession on lap 34 to take the lead, but Verstappen soon repassed him and Russell recovered second. Russell passed Verstappen at turn 1 on lap 37, but Verstappen regained the lead. Antonelli then overtook Russell for second on lap 38. On lap 38, Hamilton and Leclerc collided while contesting sixth place. After Hamilton had unsuccessfully attempted to pass Norris, Leclerc tried to overtake his teammate on the inside of turn 7. The contact spun Hamilton around, and Leclerc received a ten-second penalty. The stewards held Leclerc responsible, judging that he had approached from too far behind to be entitled to space on the inside. Antonelli briefly took the lead on lap 39 and continued to exchange positions with Verstappen, crossing the line 0.001 seconds ahead on lap 43. Verstappen asked Red Bull about changing his final-lap energy deployment to prevent such an outcome at the finish, but the team advised that no better strategy was available.

==== Closing laps ====
On lap 48, Russell attempted to pass Antonelli for second at turn 5, but locked up and hit the barrier. He was able to continue, although the incident dropped him to ninth and ended his challenge for victory. Approaching the final lap, Antonelli lifted off the throttle to remain behind Verstappen and retain access to overtake mode. This triggered a problem with his energy deployment. Norris and Piastri passed him into turn 1 on the final lap, and Gasly also moved ahead. Antonelli subsequently repassed Gasly at the chicane to recover fourth.

Verstappen won by 0.639 seconds over Norris, with Piastri completing the podium ahead of Antonelli. Gasly and teammate Franco Colapinto were classified fifth and sixth, followed by Hamilton, Carlos Sainz Jr. (Williams), Russell and Leclerc. Sainz overtook Russell on the run to the finish line. Leclerc had crossed the line sixth before his penalty was applied. Piastri's recovery from 17th gave him his first podium since the Miami Grand Prix. Hadjar finished 14th on the road but received a post-race ten-second penalty for driving unnecessarily slowly under safety car conditions, dropping him behind Lawson to 15th. Fernando Alonso (Aston Martin) retired after completing 49 laps but was classified 19th. Pérez received a five-place grid penalty for the following race in Qatar for his collision with Câmara.

==== Post-race ====
Formula One's figures recorded 352 overtakes, including 35 changes of the lead. Drivers differed in their assessments of the racing: Verstappen criticised its reliance on battery deployment, and Pérez described the overtaking as artificial, while Hamilton and Sainz praised the race. Norris welcomed the close competition but argued that the drivers would have enjoyed it more without the need to manage electrical energy so extensively.

Ferrari team principal Frédéric Vasseur summoned Leclerc for discussions immediately after the race and criticised the collision as unacceptable and unprofessional. He referred to the team's earlier discussions following the drivers' clash at the Mexico City Grand Prix, and said that their conduct had shown a lack of respect for the team. Verstappen also responded to Russell's criticism following their collision in final practice. He criticised Russell's performances during the season and expressed satisfaction at his late-race mistake, but denied that Russell's earlier remarks had provided additional motivation. Red Bull team principal Laurent Mekies said that the rivalry had not distracted either Verstappen or the team from their racing programme.

=== Race classification ===
Pos.	No.	Driver	Constructor	Laps	Time/Retired	Grid	Points
1	3	(Netherlands) Max Verstappen	Red Bull Racing-Red Bull Ford	50	1:27:39.624	1	25
2	1	(United Kingdom) Lando Norris	McLaren-Mercedes	50	+0.639	3	18
3	81	(Australia) Oscar Piastri	McLaren-Mercedes	50	+1.529	17	15
4	12	(Italy) Kimi Antonelli	Mercedes	50	+2.574	6	12
5	10	(France) Pierre Gasly	Alpine-Mercedes	50	+2.927	8	10
6	43	(Argentina) Franco Colapinto	Alpine-Mercedes	50	+7.955	9	8
7	44	(United Kingdom) Lewis Hamilton	Ferrari	50	+12.795	11	6
8	55	(Spain) Carlos Sainz Jr.	Atlassian Williams-Mercedes	50	+12.938	20	4
9	63	(United Kingdom) George Russell	Mercedes	50	+13.192	2	2
10	16	(Monaco) Charles Leclerc	Ferrari	50	+17.554^{a}	10	1
11	27	(Germany) Nico Hülkenberg	Audi	50	+22.720	12	
12	5	(Brazil) Gabriel Bortoleto	Audi	50	+28.602	13	
13	87	(United Kingdom) Oliver Bearman	Haas-Ferrari	50	+28.843	22	
14	30	(New Zealand) Liam Lawson	Racing Bulls-Red Bull Ford	50	+36.588	PL^{b}	
15	6	(France) Isack Hadjar	Red Bull Racing-Red Bull Ford	50	+46.488^{c}	4	
16	51	(Brazil) Rafael Câmara	Haas-Ferrari	50	+47.814	15	
17	18	(Canada) Lance Stroll	Aston Martin Aramco-Honda	50	+1:08.353	21	
18	77	(Finland) Valtteri Bottas	Cadillac-Ferrari	50	+1:11.673	19	
19^{d}	14	(Spain) Fernando Alonso	Aston Martin Aramco-Honda	49	Engine	18	
Ret	41	(United Kingdom) Arvid Lindblad	Racing Bulls-Red Bull Ford	19	Spun off	5	
Ret	11	(Mexico) Sergio Pérez	Cadillac-Ferrari	17	Collision	16	
DNS	23	(Thailand) Alexander Albon	Atlassian Williams-Mercedes	0	Brakes	—^{e}	

Notes

- ^a – Charles Leclerc finished sixth, but received a ten-second time penalty for causing a collision with Lewis Hamilton.
- ^b – Liam Lawson started the race from the pit lane following repairs to a fuel leak. His place on the grid was left vacant.
- ^c – Isack Hadjar finished 14th on track, but received a post-race ten-second time penalty for a safety car infringement.
- ^d – Fernando Alonso was classified as he completed more than 90% of the race distance.
- ^e – Alexander Albon did not start the race due to brake issues. His place on the grid was left vacant.

== Championship standings after the race ==
Drivers' Championship standings

	Pos.	Driver	Points
	1	(Italy) **Kimi Antonelli**	402
	2	(Netherlands) Max Verstappen	304
1	3	(United Kingdom) Lewis Hamilton	267
1	4	(United Kingdom) George Russell	264
1	5	(United Kingdom) Lando Norris	264

Constructors' Championship standings

Pos.	Constructor	Points
1	(Germany) **Mercedes**	666
2	(Italy) Ferrari	517
3	(Austria) Red Bull Racing-Red Bull Ford	440
4	(United Kingdom) McLaren-Mercedes	431
5	(Italy) Racing Bulls-Red Bull Ford	114

- Note: Only the top five positions are included for both sets of standings.
- Competitors marked in bold are the 2026 World Champions.

== Notes ==
Previous race: 2026 São Paulo Grand Prix	FIA Formula One World Championship; 2026 season	Next race: 2026 Qatar Grand Prix
Previous race: 2025 Las Vegas Grand Prix	Las Vegas Grand Prix	Next race: 2027 Las Vegas Grand Prix
