= 2023 Las Vegas Grand Prix =

Twenty-first round of the 2023 F1 season

Race 21 of 22 in the 2023 Formula One World Championship
← Previous race	Next race →
- Layout of the Las Vegas Strip Circuit

Race details
- Date: November 18, 2023
- Official name: Formula 1 Heineken Silver Las Vegas Grand Prix 2023
- Location: Las Vegas Strip Circuit; Paradise, Nevada, United States
- Course: Street circuit
- Course length: 6.201 km (3.853 miles)
- Distance: 50 laps, 309.958 km (192.599 miles)
- Weather: Clear
- Attendance: 315,000

Pole position
Driver	(Monaco) Charles Leclerc	Ferrari
- Time: 1:32.726

Fastest lap
Driver	(Australia) Oscar Piastri	McLaren-Mercedes
- Time: 1:35.490 on lap 47

Podium
First	(Netherlands) Max Verstappen	Red Bull Racing-Honda RBPT
Second	(Monaco) Charles Leclerc	Ferrari
Third	(Mexico) Sergio Pérez	Red Bull Racing-Honda RBPT

The 2023 Las Vegas Grand Prix (officially known as the Formula 1 Heineken Silver Las Vegas Grand Prix 2023) was a Formula One motor race that was held on November 18, 2023, at the Las Vegas Strip Circuit in Paradise, Nevada, United States. It was the twenty-first and penultimate race of the 2023 Formula One World Championship and the first running of the Las Vegas Grand Prix.

Charles Leclerc took pole position, with fellow Ferrari driver Carlos Sainz qualifying second, although Sainz started twelfth due to a grid penalty. Max Verstappen therefore started second in, and ultimately won, the race, followed by Leclerc and Sergio Pérez, in a hard-fought battle that saw multiple changes in race leader. Pérez secured second in the Drivers' Championship, giving Red Bull Racing their first ever 1–2 in the Drivers' Championship.

== Background ==
The event was held across November 16–18. It was the twenty-first round of the 2023 Formula One World Championship and the first running of a Formula One World Championship race run under the official name of Las Vegas Grand Prix. It was the 1,100th Formula One World Championship Grand Prix since the inaugural season in 1950.

The event marked the first Formula One race in Las Vegas since the 1982 Caesars Palace Grand Prix and the first street race in the city since the 2007 Vegas Grand Prix, a Champ Car World Series event. It took place around the Las Vegas Strip on a brand-new street track. It was the third and final Grand Prix in the United States to take place on the 2023 calendar after the Miami and the United States Grands Prix, and marked the first time since 1982 that there was three races held in the United States in a Formula One season. The Grand Prix began at 22:00 local time (UTC−8) on Saturday, November 18, 2023, becoming the first Formula One World Championship Grand Prix race to start on a Saturday since the 1985 South African Grand Prix.

=== Circuit design and layout ===
The 6.201 km (3.853 mi) street circuit runs counterclockwise and features 17 corners and a 1.9 km (1.2 mi) straight. It starts in a former parking lot which had been bought by Formula One for $240 million and developed into the pits and paddock area, and now contains the permanent part of the circuit. The track goes down the Las Vegas Strip. The 1.9 km (1.2 mi) flat-out section with two straights and a slight sweeping left curve goes past some of Las Vegas's most famous hotels and casinos.

==== Track certification ====
On March 5, 2024, the BBC reported that FIA president Mohammed Ben Sulayem had allegedly tried to pressure race officials into not certifying the circuit in time for the race. This came the day after it was announced that Sulayem had also been placed under FIA investigation for allegedly persuading stewards to overturn a penalty given to Fernando Alonso at the 2023 Saudi Arabian Grand Prix. The FIA later cleared Ben Sulayem over any wrongdoing over either incident.

=== Championship standings before the race ===
Coming into the weekend, Max Verstappen led the Drivers' Championship with 524 points. He led his teammate Sergio Pérez by 266 points and Lewis Hamilton by a further 32 points. Hamilton was ahead of Fernando Alonso in fourth by 28 points, with Lando Norris in fifth, three points behind. Red Bull Racing led the Constructors' Championship with 782 points, 400 points ahead of Mercedes and a further 20 points ahead of Ferrari. McLaren, in fourth, was behind Ferrari by 80 points and ahead of Aston Martin, in fifth, by 21 points.

=== Entrants ===
The drivers and teams were the same as the season entry list with the exception of Daniel Ricciardo, who replaced Nyck de Vries at AlphaTauri starting at the Hungarian Grand Prix.

=== Tyre choices ===
Tyre supplier Pirelli brought the C3, C4, and C5 tyre compounds (designated hard, medium, and soft, respectively), the three softest compounds in their dry tyre range, for teams to use at the event.

== Practice ==
Three free practice sessions were held for the event. The first free practice session was held on November 16, 2023, at 20:30 local time (UTC−8). Charles Leclerc was fastest ahead of Nico Hülkenberg and Kevin Magnussen. The session was red-flagged after Carlos Sainz Jr. stopped on track due to hitting a loose metal cover on the track surface; the session was abandoned to fix the issue. Sainz's car floor was damaged extensively, as was Esteban Ocon's. The damage caused to Sainz's energy store resulted in him having to take a third unit, outside the two permitted. This led to Sainz receiving a 10-place grid penalty for the race.

The second free practice session was held on November 17, 2023, and was scheduled for 00:00. The session was extended from 60 to 90 minutes to make up for the curtailed first practice and was delayed by two and a half hours while the circuit's draincovers were checked. The session was topped by Leclerc ahead of Sainz and Fernando Alonso. The third free practice session was held on November 17, 2023, at 20:30. The session was red-flagged with three minutes remaining, when Alexander Albon stopped on the track after hitting the wall; it was not resumed and was topped by George Russell, ahead of Oscar Piastri and Logan Sargeant.

Following the curtailed first practice session, fans were ejected from the venue at 1:30. Due to that, the second practice session was held without many fans in the grandstands. Formula One CEO Stefano Domenicali issued a public statement regarding the incident. The organisers of the event gave out merchandise vouchers worth $200 for the in-circuit store. The ejection of fans led to the Dimopoulos law firm, together with the Nevada-based law firm JK Legal & Consulting launching a class action lawsuit on behalf of 35,000 fans.

In a press conference held with team principals after the first practice session was curtailed, Ferrari team principal Fred Vasseur, who was noticeably irate during the session, was critical of the drain cover issues, stating that the damage to Sainz's car cost them "a fortune". Conversely, Mercedes team principal Toto Wolff criticised the negative feedback regarding the Grand Prix and downplayed Sainz's accident while praising Liberty Media and the organisers of the Grand Prix's efforts in setting up the event.

== Qualifying ==
Qualifying was held on November 18, 2023, at 00:00 local time (UTC−8).

=== Qualifying classification ===
Pos.	No.	Driver	Constructor	Qualifying times			Final grid
Pos.	No.	Driver	Constructor	Q1	Q2	Q3	Final grid
1	16	(Monaco) Charles Leclerc	Ferrari	1:33.617	1:32.775	1:32.726	1
2	55	(Spain) Carlos Sainz Jr.	Ferrari	1:33.851	1:33.338	1:32.770	12^{a}
3	1	(Netherlands) Max Verstappen	Red Bull Racing-Honda RBPT	1:34.190	1:33.572	1:33.104	2
4	63	(United Kingdom) George Russell	Mercedes	1:34.137	1:33.351	1:33.112	3
5	10	(France) Pierre Gasly	Alpine-Renault	1:34.272	1:33.494	1:33.239	4
6	23	(Thailand) Alexander Albon	Williams-Mercedes	1:34.634	1:33.588	1:33.323	5
7	2	(United States) Logan Sargeant	Williams-Mercedes	1:34.525	1:33.733	1:33.513	6
8	77	(Finland) Valtteri Bottas	Alfa Romeo-Ferrari	1:34.305	1:33.809	1:33.525	7
9	20	(Denmark) Kevin Magnussen	Haas-Ferrari	1:34.337	1:33.664	1:33.537	8
10	14	(Spain) Fernando Alonso	Aston Martin Aramco-Mercedes	1:34.422	1:33.617	1:33.555	9
11	44	(United Kingdom) Lewis Hamilton	Mercedes	1:34.307	1:33.837	N/A	10
12	11	(Mexico) Sergio Pérez	Red Bull Racing-Honda RBPT	1:34.574	1:33.855	N/A	11
13	27	(Germany) Nico Hülkenberg	Haas-Ferrari	1:34.265	1:33.979	N/A	13
14	18	(Canada) Lance Stroll	Aston Martin Aramco-Mercedes	1:34.504	1:34.199	N/A	19^{b}
15	3	(Australia) Daniel Ricciardo	AlphaTauri-Honda RBPT	1:34.683	1:34.308	N/A	14
16	4	(United Kingdom) Lando Norris	McLaren-Mercedes	1:34.703	N/A	N/A	15
17	31	(France) Esteban Ocon	Alpine-Renault	1:34.834	N/A	N/A	16
18	24	(China) Zhou Guanyu	Alfa Romeo-Ferrari	1:34.849	N/A	N/A	17
19	81	(Australia) Oscar Piastri	McLaren-Mercedes	1:34.850	N/A	N/A	18
20	22	(Japan) Yuki Tsunoda	AlphaTauri-Honda RBPT	1:36.447	N/A	N/A	20
107% time: 1:40.170

Notes

- ^a – Carlos Sainz Jr. received a ten-place grid penalty for exceeding his quota of energy store elements.
- ^b – Lance Stroll received a five-place grid penalty for overtaking under yellow flags in the third practice session.

== Race ==
The race was held on November 18, 2023, at 22:00 local time (UTC−8), and was run for 50 laps.

=== Race report ===
Charles Leclerc and Max Verstappen started on the front row of the grid. At the first corner, Verstappen forced Leclerc off the track, receiving a five-second penalty for the move. Fernando Alonso spun at that same corner and collected Valtteri Bottas, but both continued without major damage. A virtual safety car period was observed while the damage was cleaned from the track. Lando Norris lost control of the rear of his car and had a heavy crash on the third lap of the race, marking his first retirement of the season. The safety car was brought out to recover his stricken McLaren MCL60. Norris went to the University Medical Center of Southern Nevada for precautionary checks and was discharged the same day. Leclerc passed Verstappen on track before Verstappen had pitted and served the penalty. Though Leclerc extended his first tyre stint, pitting a few laps before a safety car came out due to an incident between George Russell and Verstappen that left debris on the track. The safety car allowed the Red Bulls and much of the rest of the grid to pit without losing significant time, reducing Leclerc's advantage.

The pair of Verstappen and Leclerc fought for the lead throughout the race along with Sergio Pérez. By the end of the race, Verstappen had a small but comfortable lead with Leclerc and Pérez fighting over second. Leclerc passed Pérez on the final lap to secure second, with Pérez rounding out the podium. The third-place podium handed Pérez second place in the Championship, giving Red Bull their first ever 1–2 in the Drivers' Championship. The two Mercedes drivers also secured their positions in the Drivers' Championship: Lewis Hamilton secured third place by finishing seventh. His teammate George Russell's eighth-place finish secured him eighth position in the standings, which marked the lowest Drivers' Championship finish for a Mercedes driver since 2012.

=== Race classification ===
Pos.	No.	Driver	Constructor	Laps	Time/Retired	Grid	Points
1	1	(Netherlands) Max Verstappen	Red Bull Racing-Honda RBPT	50	1:29:08.289	2	25
2	16	(Monaco) Charles Leclerc	Ferrari	50	+2.070	1	18
3	11	(Mexico) Sergio Pérez	Red Bull Racing-Honda RBPT	50	+2.241	11	15
4	31	(France) Esteban Ocon	Alpine-Renault	50	+18.665	16	12
5	18	(Canada) Lance Stroll	Aston Martin Aramco-Mercedes	50	+20.067	19	10
6	55	(Spain) Carlos Sainz Jr.	Ferrari	50	+20.834	12	8
7	44	(United Kingdom) Lewis Hamilton	Mercedes	50	+21.755	10	6
8	63	(United Kingdom) George Russell	Mercedes	50	+23.091^{a}	3	4
9	14	(Spain) Fernando Alonso	Aston Martin Aramco-Mercedes	50	+25.964	9	2
10	81	(Australia) Oscar Piastri	McLaren-Mercedes	50	+29.496	18	2^{b}
11	10	(France) Pierre Gasly	Alpine-Renault	50	+34.270	4	
12	23	(Thailand) Alexander Albon	Williams-Mercedes	50	+43.398	5	
13	20	(Denmark) Kevin Magnussen	Haas-Ferrari	50	+44.825	8	
14	3	(Australia) Daniel Ricciardo	AlphaTauri-Honda RBPT	50	+48.525	14	
15	24	(China) Zhou Guanyu	Alfa Romeo-Ferrari	50	+50.162	17	
16	2	(United States) Logan Sargeant	Williams-Mercedes	50	+50.882	6	
17	77	(Finland) Valtteri Bottas	Alfa Romeo-Ferrari	50	+1:25.350	7	
18^{c}	22	(Japan) Yuki Tsunoda	AlphaTauri-Honda RBPT	46	Gearbox	20	
19^{c}	27	(Germany) Nico Hülkenberg	Haas-Ferrari	45	Engine	13	
Ret	4	(United Kingdom) Lando Norris	McLaren-Mercedes	2	Accident	15	
Fastest lap: (Australia) Oscar Piastri (McLaren-Mercedes) – 1:35.490 (lap 47)

Notes

- ^a – George Russell finished fourth, but he received a five-second time penalty for causing a collision with Max Verstappen.
- ^b – Includes one point for fastest lap.
- ^c – Yuki Tsunoda and Nico Hülkenberg were classified as they completed more than 90% of the race distance.

== Championship standings after the race ==
Drivers' Championship standings

	Pos.	Driver	Points
	1	(Netherlands) **Max Verstappen***	549
	2	(Mexico) Sergio Pérez	273
	3	(United Kingdom) Lewis Hamilton	232
2	4	(Spain) Carlos Sainz Jr.	200
1	5	(Spain) Fernando Alonso	200

Constructors' Championship standings

Pos.	Constructor	Points
1	(Austria) **Red Bull Racing-Honda RBPT***	822
2	(Germany) Mercedes	392
3	(Italy) Ferrari	388
4	(United Kingdom) McLaren-Mercedes	284
5	(United Kingdom) Aston Martin Aramco-Mercedes	273

- Note: Only the top five positions are included for both sets of standings.
- Competitors in bold and marked with an asterisk are the 2023 World Champions.

Previous race: 2023 São Paulo Grand Prix	FIA Formula One World Championship; 2023 season	Next race: 2023 Abu Dhabi Grand Prix
Previous race: N/A; Previous F1 race in Las Vegas: 1982 Caesars Palace Grand Prix	Las Vegas Grand Prix	Next race: 2024 Las Vegas Grand Prix
