= 2025 Las Vegas Grand Prix =

Twenty-second round of the 2025 F1 season

Race 22 of 24 in the 2025 Formula One World Championship
← Previous race	Next race →
- Layout of the Las Vegas Strip Circuit

Race details
- Date: November 22, 2025
- Official name: Formula 1 Heineken Las Vegas Grand Prix 2025
- Location: Las Vegas Strip Circuit; Paradise, Nevada, United States
- Course: Street circuit
- Course length: 6.201 km (3.853 miles)
- Distance: 50 laps, 309.958 km (192.599 miles)
- Weather: Clear

Pole position
Driver	(United Kingdom) Lando Norris	McLaren-Mercedes
- Time: 1:47.934

Fastest lap
Driver	(Netherlands) Max Verstappen	Red Bull Racing-Honda RBPT
- Time: 1:33.365 on lap 50 (lap record)

Podium
First	(Netherlands) Max Verstappen	Red Bull Racing-Honda RBPT
Second	(United Kingdom) George Russell	Mercedes
Third	(Italy) Kimi Antonelli	Mercedes

The 2025 Las Vegas Grand Prix (officially known as the Formula 1 Heineken Las Vegas Grand Prix 2025) was a Formula One motor race held on November 22, 2025, at the Las Vegas Strip Circuit in Paradise, Nevada, United States. It was the twenty-second round of the 2025 Formula One World Championship.

McLaren driver Lando Norris took pole position for the event, but lost out to Red Bull's Max Verstappen, who took his second win in Las Vegas. George Russell and Kimi Antonelli (both Mercedes) – the latter of whom started from seventeenth and carried a five-second penalty – rounded out the podium. Norris initially finished second on track, but he and teammate Oscar Piastri (who was initially classified fourth) were both disqualified post-race for excessive plank wear on the bottom of their cars.

Despite his disqualification, Norris retained his championship lead, though Verstappen continued to close the gap to his lead, with the latter now level on points with Piastri; in the Constructors' Championship, no changes at the top were observed with McLaren, despite the double disqualification, remaining at the top with 756 points, with Mercedes, Red Bull, and Ferrari retaining their respective positions with 431, 391, and 378 points, respectively.

== Background ==
The event was held at the Las Vegas Strip Circuit in Paradise, Nevada, for the third time in the circuit's history, across the weekend of November 20–22. The Grand Prix was the twenty-second round of the 2025 Formula One World Championship and the third running of the Las Vegas Grand Prix.

=== Championship standings before the race ===
Going into the weekend, Lando Norris led the Drivers' Championship with 390 points, 24 points ahead of his teammate Oscar Piastri in second, and 49 points ahead of Max Verstappen. McLaren, who won the Constructors' Championship at the Singapore Grand Prix, were ahead of Mercedes and Red Bull Racing, who were second and third with 398 and 366 points, respectively.

=== Entrants ===
The drivers and teams were the same as published in the season entry list with two exceptions; Yuki Tsunoda at Red Bull Racing held the seat originally held by Liam Lawson before Lawson was demoted back to Racing Bulls from the Japanese Grand Prix onward, and Franco Colapinto replaced Jack Doohan at Alpine from the Emilia Romagna Grand Prix onward on a race-by-race basis. The Grand Prix marked Lando Norris and George Russell's 150th entry.

=== Tyre choices ===
Tyre supplier Pirelli brought the C3, C4, and C5 tyre compounds designated hard, medium, and soft, respectively, for teams to use at the event.

== Practice ==
Three free practice sessions were held for the event. The first free practice session was held on November 20, 2025, at 16:30 local time (UTC–8), and was topped by Charles Leclerc ahead of Alexander Albon and Yuki Tsunoda. The second free practice session was held on the same day, at 20:00 local time, and was topped by Lando Norris ahead of Kimi Antonelli and Leclerc. A red flag was flown after a loose drain cover was reported around turn 17. Shortly after the session resumed, race control personnel stationed on the track confirmed that the drain cover continued to move, forcing another premature stoppage. The third free practice session was held on November 21, 2025, at 16:30 local time, and was topped by George Russell followed by Max Verstappen and Albon.

== Qualifying ==
Qualifying was held on November 21, 2025, at 20:00 local time (UTC−8), and determined the starting grid order for the race.

=== Qualifying report ===
Heavy rain was observed earlier in the night, resulting in the session being started on a wet track. The early phases of the session were completed on the full-wet tyre, before the track dried out leading to the intermediate-wet tyre being used.

The first session saw Alexander Albon, Kimi Antonelli, Gabriel Bortoleto, Yuki Tsunoda, and Lewis Hamilton all eliminated. Albon hit the wall at turn 16, and Hamilton's last-place qualification marked the first time that he has qualified last on pure pace, and Ferrari's first last-place qualification since the 2009 Abu Dhabi Grand Prix. Williams driver Carlos Sainz Jr. was investigated for rejoining the track unsafely; he was not awarded a penalty.

The second session saw Nico Hülkenberg, Lance Stroll, who switched to intermediates late into Q2, Haas drivers Esteban Ocon and Oliver Bearman, and Franco Colapinto all eliminated. The session was delayed to remove debris from the circuit and replace a bollard at the turn 14 apex. The third session saw all teams switch to intermediates, as the track began to dry, where Lando Norris took pole position from Max Verstappen and Sainz. George Russell qualified fourth ahead of Championship contender Oscar Piastri in fifth. Liam Lawson, Fernando Alonso, Isack Hadjar, Charles Leclerc, and Pierre Gasly completed the top ten.

=== Qualifying classification ===
Pos.	No.	Driver	Constructor	Qualifying times			Final grid
Pos.	No.	Driver	Constructor	Q1	Q2	Q3	Final grid
1	4	(United Kingdom) Lando Norris	McLaren-Mercedes	1:55.473	1:51.379	1:47.934	1
2	1	(Netherlands) Max Verstappen	Red Bull Racing-Honda RBPT	1:53.458	1:51.593	1:48.257	2
3	55	(Spain) Carlos Sainz Jr.	Williams-Mercedes	1:54.873	1:51.144	1:48.296	3
4	63	(United Kingdom) George Russell	Mercedes	1:53.144	1:50.935	1:48.803	4
5	81	(Australia) Oscar Piastri	McLaren-Mercedes	1:54.544	1:52.126	1:48.961	5
6	30	(New Zealand) Liam Lawson	Racing Bulls-Honda RBPT	1:54.828	1:51.621	1:49.062	6
7	14	(Spain) Fernando Alonso	Aston Martin Aramco-Mercedes	1:53.739	1:51.865	1:49.466	7
8	6	(France) Isack Hadjar	Racing Bulls-Honda RBPT	1:55.613	1:51.120	1:49.554	8
9	16	(Monaco) Charles Leclerc	Ferrari	1:54.814	1:51.952	1:49.872	9
10	10	(France) Pierre Gasly	Alpine-Renault	1:54.432	1:51.760	1:51.540	10
11	27	(Germany) Nico Hülkenberg	Kick Sauber-Ferrari	1:54.555	1:52.781	N/A	11
12	18	(Canada) Lance Stroll	Aston Martin Aramco-Mercedes	1:54.416	1:52.850	N/A	12
13	31	(France) Esteban Ocon	Haas-Ferrari	1:54.635	1:52.987	N/A	13
14	87	(United Kingdom) Oliver Bearman	Haas-Ferrari	1:56.016	1:53.094	N/A	14
15	43	(Argentina) Franco Colapinto	Alpine-Renault	1:54.847	1:53.683	N/A	15
16	23	(Thailand) Alexander Albon	Williams-Mercedes	1:56.220	N/A	N/A	16
17	12	(Italy) Kimi Antonelli	Mercedes	1:56.314	N/A	N/A	17
18	5	(Brazil) Gabriel Bortoleto	Kick Sauber-Ferrari	1:56.674	N/A	N/A	18
19	22	(Japan) Yuki Tsunoda	Red Bull Racing-Honda RBPT	1:56.798	N/A	N/A	PL^{1}
20	44	(United Kingdom) Lewis Hamilton	Ferrari	1:57.115	N/A	N/A	19
107% time: 2:01.064

Notes

- ^1 – Yuki Tsunoda qualified 19th, but was required to start the race from the pit lane for exceeding his quota of power unit elements and replacing them under parc fermé conditions.

== Race ==
The race was held on November 22, 2025, at 20:00 local time (UTC−8), and was run for 50 laps.

=== Race ===
Polesitter Lando Norris of McLaren lost the lead into turn 1 after going wide. Starting from second, Red Bull driver Max Verstappen overtook Norris for the lead and Mercedes driver George Russell also moved up from fourth to second, leaving Norris in third. Liam Lawson and Oscar Piastri made wheel-to-wheel contact in the opening lap, but neither cars were damaged. At the back of the field, rookie Gabriel Bortoleto collided with Aston Martin driver Lance Stroll and both drivers retired from the race. Mercedes rookie Kimi Antonelli received a 5-second penalty for a false start. Lawson damaged his car in the second lap and the virtual safety car was called. Lawson and Antonelli pitted under the virtual safety car; Antonelli opted for a one-stop strategy and switched to the hard tyres, which he ran for the remaining 48 laps. Alexander Albon of Williams and Lewis Hamilton of Ferrari made contact on lap 14, resulting in a 5-second penalty for the former for causing a collision. Albon did not have a working radio for the entire race and he retired with damage. Russell reported a steering issue during the race, and Norris overtook him on lap 34 at turn 14. Norris reported a problem on lap 48 and was instructed to lift and coast until the end of the race. Max Verstappen won his sixth race of the 2025 season, and his 69th overall, with Lando Norris finishing second and George Russell in third.

=== Post-race ===
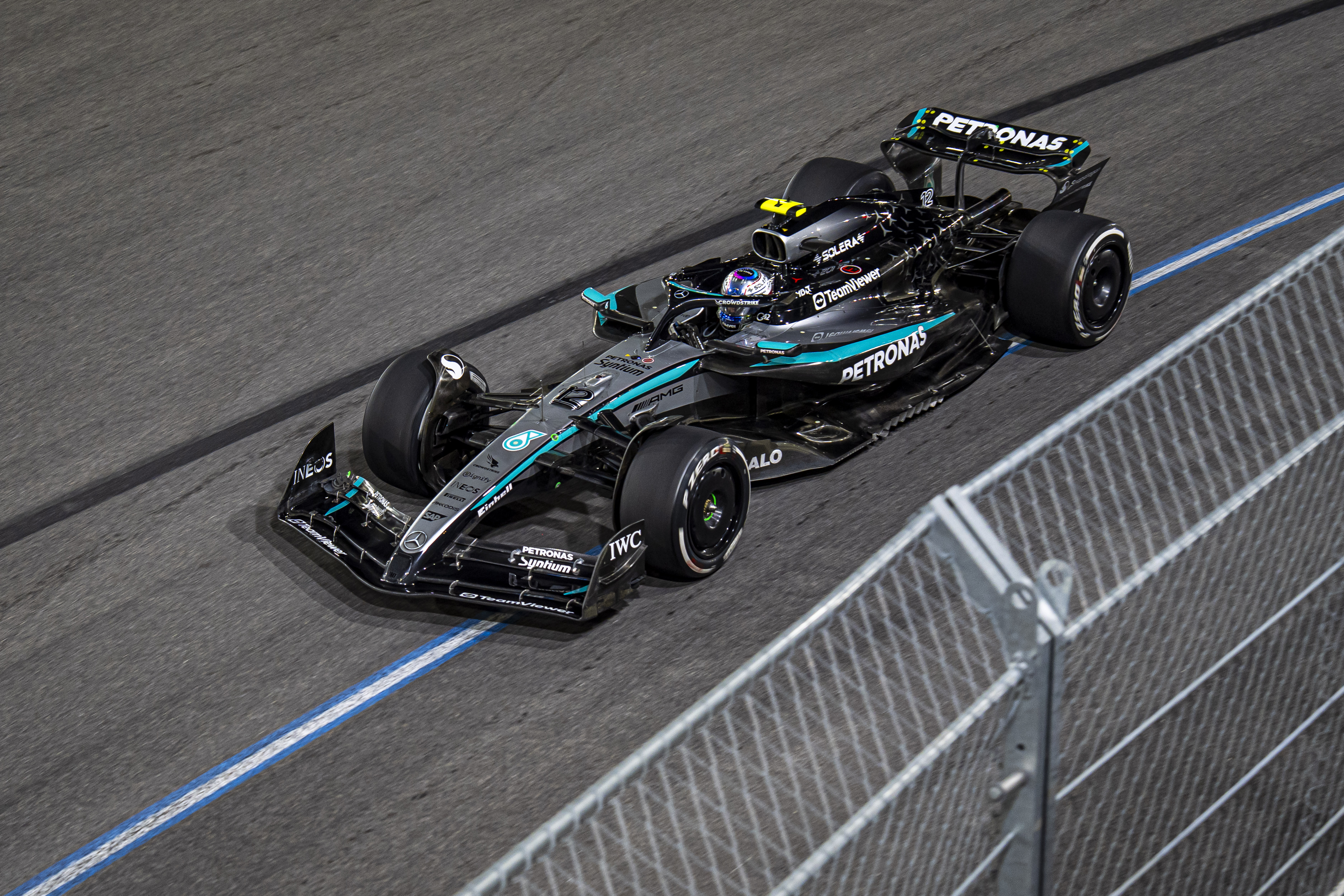
Antonelli took his third career podium following the disqualification of the McLaren cars.

Both McLaren cars of Lando Norris and Oscar Piastri were disqualified from the race for excessive skid wear following routine post race car inspections. The disqualification led to the promotion of both Mercedes drivers onto the podium, with Russell going from third to second and Antonelli from fifth to third. Bortoleto was given a five-place grid penalty to be served in the following Qatar Grand Prix for the collision with Stroll.

Following McLaren's double disqualification, the result meant that Norris retained his points advantage of 24 points over Piastri in the Drivers' Championship, with Verstappen's victory allowing him to be level on points with Piastri, on 366 points. In the Constructors' Championship, McLaren remained on 756 points and second-placed constructor Mercedes reduced the gap to 325 points. Red Bull remained in third with 391 points, thirteen ahead of Ferrari.

=== Race classification ===
Pos.	No.	Driver	Constructor	Laps	Time/Retired	Grid	Points
1	1	(Netherlands) Max Verstappen	Red Bull Racing-Honda RBPT	50	1:21:08.429	2	25
2	63	(United Kingdom) George Russell	Mercedes	50	+23.546	4	18
3	12	(Italy) Kimi Antonelli	Mercedes	50	+30.488^{1}	17	15
4	16	(Monaco) Charles Leclerc	Ferrari	50	+30.678	9	12
5	55	(Spain) Carlos Sainz Jr.	Williams-Mercedes	50	+34.924	3	10
6	6	(France) Isack Hadjar	Racing Bulls-Honda RBPT	50	+45.257	8	8
7	27	(Germany) Nico Hülkenberg	Kick Sauber-Ferrari	50	+51.134	11	6
8	44	(United Kingdom) Lewis Hamilton	Ferrari	50	+59.369	19	4
9	31	(France) Esteban Ocon	Haas-Ferrari	50	+1:00.635	13	2
10	87	(United Kingdom) Oliver Bearman	Haas-Ferrari	50	+1:10.549	14	1
11	14	(Spain) Fernando Alonso	Aston Martin Aramco-Mercedes	50	+1:25.308	7	
12	22	(Japan) Yuki Tsunoda	Red Bull Racing-Honda RBPT	50	+1:26.974	PL	
13	10	(France) Pierre Gasly	Alpine-Renault	50	+1:31.702	10	
14	30	(New Zealand) Liam Lawson	Racing Bulls-Honda RBPT	49	+1 lap	6	
15	43	(Argentina) Franco Colapinto	Alpine-Renault	49	+1 lap	15	
Ret	23	(Thailand) Alexander Albon	Williams-Mercedes	35	Collision damage	16	
Ret	5	(Brazil) Gabriel Bortoleto	Kick Sauber-Ferrari	2	Collision	18	
Ret	18	(Canada) Lance Stroll	Aston Martin Aramco-Mercedes	0	Collision	12	
DSQ	4	(United Kingdom) Lando Norris	McLaren-Mercedes	50	Plank wear^{2}	1	
DSQ	81	(Australia) Oscar Piastri	McLaren-Mercedes	50	Plank wear^{2}	5	

Notes

- ^1 – Kimi Antonelli finished fourth, but received a five-second time penalty for moving prior to the start signal. He was initially dropped to fifth in the provisional classification, but gained two positions following the disqualifications of Lando Norris and Oscar Piastri.
- ^2 – Lando Norris and Oscar Piastri finished second and fourth, respectively, but were disqualified for excessive plank wear.

== Championship standings after the race ==
Drivers' Championship standings

Pos.	Driver	Points
1	(United Kingdom) **Lando Norris***	390
2	(Australia) **Oscar Piastri***	366
3	(Netherlands) **Max Verstappen***	366
4	(United Kingdom) George Russell	294
5	(Monaco) Charles Leclerc	226

Constructors' Championship standings

Pos.	Constructor	Points
1	(United Kingdom) **McLaren-Mercedes***	756
2	(Germany) Mercedes	431
3	(Austria) Red Bull Racing-Honda RBPT	391
4	(Italy) Ferrari	378
5	(United Kingdom) Williams-Mercedes	121

- Note: Only the top five positions are included for both sets of standings.
- Competitor marked in bold and with an asterisk still has a theoretical chance of becoming World Champion.

Previous race: 2025 São Paulo Grand Prix	FIA Formula One World Championship; 2025 season	Next race: 2025 Qatar Grand Prix
Previous race: 2024 Las Vegas Grand Prix	Las Vegas Grand Prix	Next race: 2026 Las Vegas Grand Prix
