= Las Vegas Strip Circuit =

Racing circuit in United States

- Grand Prix Circuit (2023–present)
- Location: Paradise, Nevada, United States
- Coordinates: 36°06′36″N 115°09′44″W
- Capacity: 100,000
- FIA Grade: 1 (Grand Prix)
- Broke ground: March 2022; 4 years ago
- Opened: November 16, 2023; 3 years ago
- Architect: Carsten Tilke
- Major events: Current: Formula One; Las Vegas Grand Prix (2023–present); F1 Academy (2025–present); Former: Ferrari Challenge North America (2024)
- Website: https://www.f1lasvegasgp.com/track-layout/

Grand Prix Circuit (2023–present)
- Surface: Asphalt
- Length: 3.853 mi (6.201 km)
- Turns: 17
- Race lap record: 1:33.365 ( (Netherlands) Max Verstappen, Red Bull Racing RB21, 2025, F1)

The Las Vegas Strip Circuit is a street circuit around parts of the Las Vegas Strip in Paradise, Nevada, immediately adjacent to Las Vegas, Nevada. It winds through the streets of the city and comprises the Las Vegas Strip, a section of Las Vegas Boulevard that is home to the city's major hotels and casinos. It incorporates some of the most notable landmarks of the city, including MSG Sphere, Caesars Palace, Bellagio, and Paris Las Vegas.

Designed by Carsten Tilke, the son of Formula One circuit designer Hermann Tilke, the circuit broke ground in March 2022 and opened on November 16, 2023, during the weekend of the first Las Vegas Grand Prix.

== History ==
This circuit has been designed to incorporate part of the Las Vegas Strip. The cars pass several local landmarks that are illuminated at night. The county has given Formula One permission to use the roads required for the race for ten years. When the race was announced in March 2022, the track layout featured 14 corners. It was later revised with the addition of a chicane, bringing the number of corners to 17.

=== Alleged attempt to prevent circuit certification ===
On March 5, 2024, several months after the inaugural 2023 race at the track, the BBC reported that FIA president Mohammed Ben Sulayem had allegedly tried to pressure race officials into not certifying the circuit in time for the race. This came the day after it was announced that Sulayem had also been placed under FIA investigation for allegedly persuading stewards to overturn a penalty given to Fernando Alonso at the 2023 Saudi Arabian Grand Prix. However, on March 20, 2024, the FIA announced it had cleared Ben Sulayem of any wrongdoing.

== Layout ==
Main start/finish straight

The 3.853 mi (6.201 km) street circuit runs counterclockwise and features 17 corners and a 1.2 mi (1.9 km) straight. It starts in a former parking lot that was purchased by Formula One for $240 million and developed into the pits and paddock area, and now contains a permanent part of the circuit. The first corner is a hairpin, and after that the course bends slightly left and then into a fast right, transitioning from the permanent circuit to city streets. The cars go 0.5 mi (0.8 km) down Koval Lane before entering a slow 90-degree right turn and then entering a long, sweeping left turn that encircles the Sphere arena, before going through a left–right twisty section (a change from the initial design) and then a slightly faster left turn that transitions onto Sands Avenue.

The track then goes through two high-speed bends (Turns 10–11) on Sands Avenue before entering a slow left turn (Turn 12) onto Las Vegas Boulevard. The 1.2 mi (1.9 km) flat-out section with two straights and a slight sweeping left curve (Turn 13) starts at the Venetian and proceed south past some of Las Vegas's most famous hotels and casinos, including Flamingo, Paris, Bellagio, the Cosmopolitan, and Caesars Palace. The circuit then goes through Turns 14–16, a tight series of three slow corners onto Harmon Avenue at the Planet Hollywood casino, down a 0.5 mi (0.8 km) straight before going through a fast left bend (Turn 17) to complete the lap and transition back to the permanent part of the circuit after the pits.

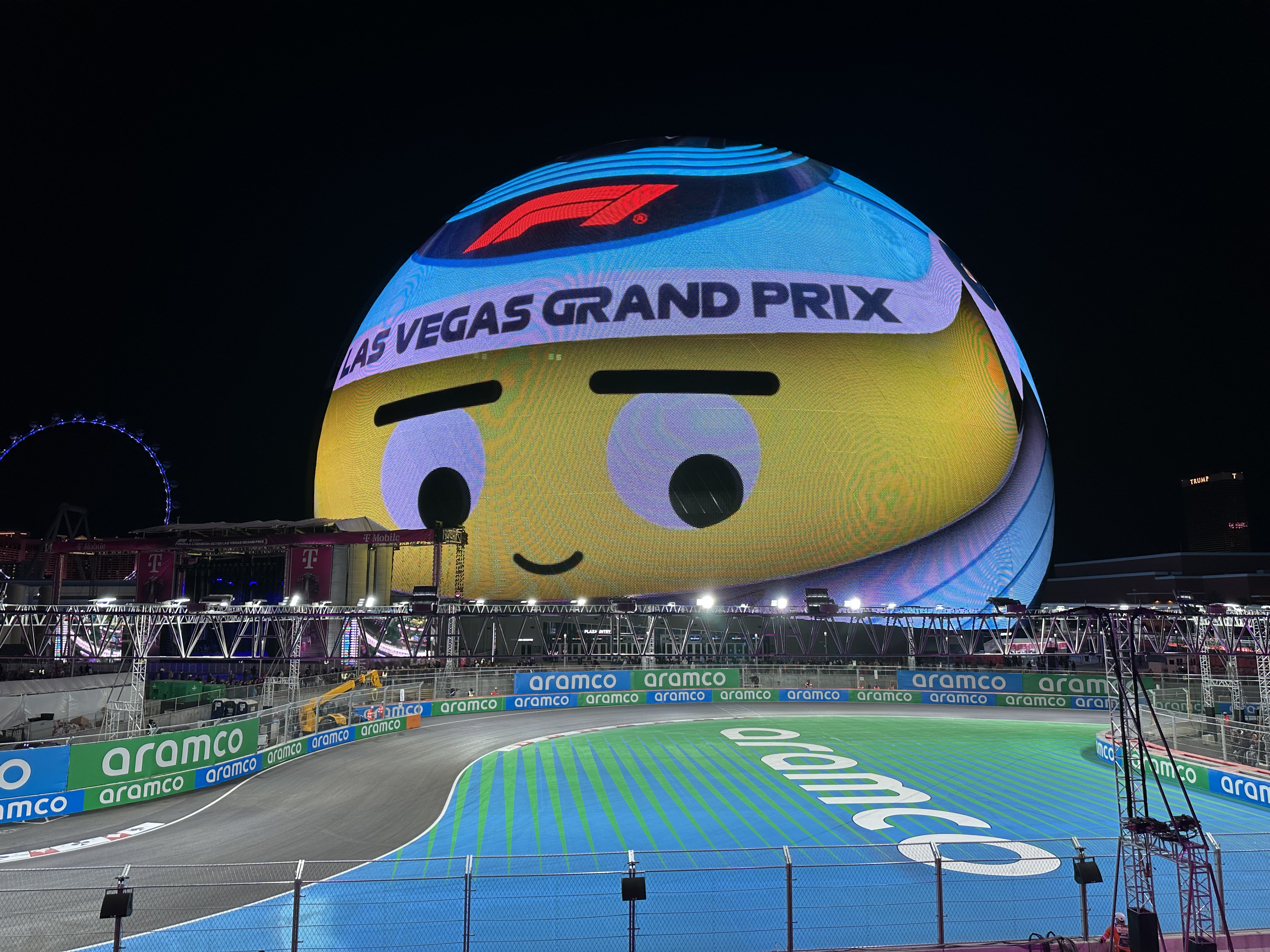
Las Vegas circuit at the Sphere

The maximum speed recorded in a 2025 Formula One car was 222.6 mph (358.3 km/h), established by Yuki Tsunoda in a Red Bull at the end of the Las Vegas Strip. The record average speed for the pole position lap is 150.3 mph (241.9 km/h), set by George Russell in a Mercedes for the 2024 race, and the average speed for the record lap during the race was 148.6 mph (239.1 km/h), set by Max Verstappen in a Red Bull for the 2025 race.

== Events ==
Current

- November: Formula One Las Vegas Grand Prix, F1 Academy

Former

- Ferrari Challenge North America (2024)

== Lap records ==
As of November 2025, the fastest official race lap records at the Las Vegas Strip Circuit are listed as:

Category	Time	Driver	Vehicle	Event
Grand Prix Circuit: 3.853 miles (6.201 km) (2023–present)
Formula One	1:33.365	Max Verstappen	Red Bull Racing RB21	2025 Las Vegas Grand Prix
Ferrari Challenge	1:54.677	Michael Verhagen	Ferrari 296 Challenge	2024 Las Vegas Ferrari Challenge North America round
Formula 4	2:06.623	Chloe Chambers	Tatuus F4-T421	2025 Las Vegas F1 Academy round
