= 2023 Dutch Grand Prix =

Formula One motor race

Race 13 of 22 in the 2023 Formula One World Championship
← Previous race	Next race →
- Layout of Circuit Zandvoort

Race details
- Date: 27 August 2023
- Official name: Formula 1 Heineken Dutch Grand Prix 2023
- Location: Circuit Zandvoort; Zandvoort, Netherlands
- Course: Permanent racing facility
- Course length: 4.259 km (2.646 miles)
- Distance: 72 laps, 306.587 km (190.504 miles)
- Weather: Cloudy and rainy
- Attendance: 305,000

Pole position
Driver	(Netherlands) Max Verstappen	Red Bull Racing-Honda RBPT
- Time: 1:10.567

Fastest lap
Driver	(Spain) Fernando Alonso	Aston Martin Aramco-Mercedes
- Time: 1:13.837 on lap 56

Podium
First	(Netherlands) Max Verstappen	Red Bull Racing-Honda RBPT
Second	(Spain) Fernando Alonso	Aston Martin Aramco-Mercedes
Third	(France) Pierre Gasly	Alpine-Renault

The 2023 Dutch Grand Prix (officially known as the Formula 1 Heineken Dutch Grand Prix 2023) was a Formula One motor race that was held on 27 August 2023 at Circuit Zandvoort in Zandvoort, Netherlands. It was the thirteenth round of the 2023 Formula One World Championship.

The race, largely affected by wet weather conditions, was won by Red Bull Racing driver Max Verstappen, who started from pole position, followed by Fernando Alonso of Aston Martin and Pierre Gasly of Alpine, Gasly's first podium of the season. Verstappen's victory was his ninth in a row, equaling Sebastian Vettel's record. The race featured the Grand Prix debut of Liam Lawson, substituting for AlphaTauri driver Daniel Ricciardo when the latter broke a metacarpal bone during a practice session.

== Background ==
The event was held across the weekend of 25–27 August. It was the thirteenth round of the 2023 Formula One World Championship and the 35th running of the Dutch Grand Prix.

=== Championship standings before the race ===
Coming into the weekend, Max Verstappen led the Drivers' Championship by 125 points from teammate Sergio Pérez, with Fernando Alonso third, a further 40 points behind. Red Bull Racing led the Constructors' Championship, leading Mercedes by 256 points and Aston Martin by a further 51 points.

=== Entrants ===
The drivers and teams were initially the same as the season entry list with the exception of Daniel Ricciardo, who replaced Nyck de Vries at AlphaTauri from the Hungarian Grand Prix onwards. However, Ricciardo broke a metacarpal bone in his left hand in a crash in the second practice session, and was subsequently replaced by reserve driver Liam Lawson who made his Formula One race debut. Robert Shwartzman drove for Ferrari in place of Carlos Sainz Jr. during the first practice session.

=== Tyre choices ===
Tyre supplier Pirelli brought the C1, C2 and C3 tyre compounds (designated hard, medium, and soft, respectively) for teams to use at the event.

== Practice ==
Three free practice sessions were held for the event. The first practice session was held on 25 August 2023, at 12:30 local time (UTC+2); it was red-flagged once as Nico Hülkenberg crashed at the last corner. Max Verstappen topped the session, with Fernando Alonso the second-fastest and Lewis Hamilton third.

The second free practice session was held on 25 August 2023, at 16:00 local time (UTC+2) and was topped by Lando Norris, with Verstappen the second-fastest and Alexander Albon third. The session was red-flagged when Oscar Piastri and Daniel Ricciardo crashed moments apart at turn 3. The accident resulted in a broken metacarpal bone in Ricciardo's left hand. He was deemed unfit to participate in further sessions throughout the weekend; Red Bull Racing and AlphaTauri's reserve driver Liam Lawson replaced Ricciardo for the remainder of the weekend. The third free practice session was held on 26 August 2023, at 11:30 local time (UTC+2) in wet conditions. Verstappen topped it with George Russell being second and Sergio Pérez third. The session was red-flagged three times for Kevin Magnussen's crash and spins of Zhou Guanyu and Liam Lawson.

== Qualifying ==
Qualifying was held on 26 August 2023, at 15:00 local time (UTC+2).

=== Qualifying classification ===
Pos.	No.	Driver	Constructor	Qualifying times			Final grid
Pos.	No.	Driver	Constructor	Q1	Q2	Q3	Final grid
1	1	(Netherlands) Max Verstappen	Red Bull Racing-Honda RBPT	1:20.965	1:18.856	1:10.567	1
2	4	(United Kingdom) Lando Norris	McLaren-Mercedes	1:21.276	1:19.769	1:11.104	2
3	63	(United Kingdom) George Russell	Mercedes	1:21.345	1:19.620	1:11.294	3
4	23	(Thailand) Alexander Albon	Williams-Mercedes	1:20.939	1:19.399	1:11.419	4
5	14	(Spain) Fernando Alonso	Aston Martin Aramco-Mercedes	1:21.840	1:19.429	1:11.506	5
6	55	(Spain) Carlos Sainz Jr.	Ferrari	1:21.321	1:19.929	1:11.754	6
7	11	(Mexico) Sergio Pérez	Red Bull Racing-Honda RBPT	1:21.972	1:19.856	1:11.880	7
8	81	(Australia) Oscar Piastri	McLaren-Mercedes	1:21.231	1:19.392	1:11.938	8
9	16	(Monaco) Charles Leclerc	Ferrari	1:22.019	1:19.600	1:12.665	9
10	2	(United States) Logan Sargeant	Williams-Mercedes	1:22.036	1:20.067	1:16.748	10
11	18	(Canada) Lance Stroll	Aston Martin Aramco-Mercedes	1:21.570	1:20.121	N/A	11
12	10	(France) Pierre Gasly	Alpine-Renault	1:21.735	1:20.128	N/A	12
13	44	(United Kingdom) Lewis Hamilton	Mercedes	1:21.919	1:20.151	N/A	13
14	22	(Japan) Yuki Tsunoda	AlphaTauri-Honda RBPT	1:21.781	1:20.230	N/A	17^{a}
15	27	(Germany) Nico Hülkenberg	Haas-Ferrari	1:21.891	1:20.250	N/A	14
16	24	(China) Zhou Guanyu	Alfa Romeo-Ferrari	1:22.067	N/A	N/A	15
17	31	(France) Esteban Ocon	Alpine-Renault	1:22.110	N/A	N/A	16
18	20	(Denmark) Kevin Magnussen	Haas-Ferrari	1:22.192	N/A	N/A	PL^{b}
19	77	(Finland) Valtteri Bottas	Alfa Romeo-Ferrari	1:22.260	N/A	N/A	18
20	40	(New Zealand) Liam Lawson	AlphaTauri-Honda RBPT	1:23.420	N/A	N/A	19
107% time: 1:26.604

Notes

- ^a – Yuki Tsunoda received a three-place grid penalty for impeding Lewis Hamilton in Q2.
- ^b – Kevin Magnussen qualified 18th, but he was required to start the race from the pit lane as the new elements were changed without the approval of the technical delegate during parc fermé.

== Race ==
The race was held on 27 August 2023, at 15:00 local time (UTC+2).

=== Race report ===
The race was affected by wet weather conditions and was won by Verstappen. It was his ninth victory in a row, equaling Sebastian Vettel's record. Alonso set his first fastest lap since the 2017 Hungarian Grand Prix. Alonso finished second for Aston Martin while Pierre Gasly finished third for Alpine, the latter gaining a position after Pérez received a five-second time penalty. Heavy rainfall and Zhou Guanyu's crash eight laps from the finish meant the race was suspended for three-quarters of an hour before resuming. The podium finish was Gasly's first since the 2021 Azerbaijan Grand Prix and his first as an Alpine driver.

=== Race classification ===
Pos.	No.	Driver	Constructor	Laps	Time/Retired	Grid	Points
1	1	(Netherlands) Max Verstappen	Red Bull Racing-Honda RBPT	72	2:24:04.411	1	25
2	14	(Spain) Fernando Alonso	Aston Martin Aramco-Mercedes	72	+3.744	5	19^{a}
3	10	(France) Pierre Gasly	Alpine-Renault	72	+7.058	12	15
4	11	(Mexico) Sergio Pérez	Red Bull Racing-Honda RBPT	72	+10.068^{b}	7	12
5	55	(Spain) Carlos Sainz Jr.	Ferrari	72	+12.541	6	10
6	44	(United Kingdom) Lewis Hamilton	Mercedes	72	+13.209	13	8
7	4	(United Kingdom) Lando Norris	McLaren-Mercedes	72	+13.232	2	6
8	23	(Thailand) Alexander Albon	Williams-Mercedes	72	+15.155	4	4
9	81	(Australia) Oscar Piastri	McLaren-Mercedes	72	+16.580	8	2
10	31	(France) Esteban Ocon	Alpine-Renault	72	+18.346	16	1
11	18	(Canada) Lance Stroll	Aston Martin Aramco-Mercedes	72	+20.087	11	
12	27	(Germany) Nico Hülkenberg	Haas-Ferrari	72	+20.840	14	
13	40	(New Zealand) Liam Lawson	AlphaTauri-Honda RBPT	72	+26.147	19	
14	77	(Finland) Valtteri Bottas	Alfa Romeo-Ferrari	72	+27.388	18	
15	22	(Japan) Yuki Tsunoda	AlphaTauri-Honda RBPT	72	+29.893^{c}	17	
16	20	(Denmark) Kevin Magnussen	Haas-Ferrari	72	+31.410^{d}	PL	
17	63	(United Kingdom) George Russell	Mercedes	72	+55.754	3	
Ret	24	(China) Zhou Guanyu	Alfa Romeo-Ferrari	62	Accident	15	
Ret	16	(Monaco) Charles Leclerc	Ferrari	41	Floor	9	
Ret	2	(United States) Logan Sargeant	Williams-Mercedes	14	Hydraulics/Accident	10	
Fastest lap: (Spain) Fernando Alonso (Aston Martin Aramco-Mercedes) – 1:13.837 (lap 56)

Notes

- ^a – Includes one point for fastest lap.
- ^b – Sergio Pérez finished third, but he received a five-second time penalty for speeding in the pit lane.
- ^c – Yuki Tsunoda finished 13th, but he received a five-second time penalty for causing a collision with George Russell.
- ^d – Kevin Magnussen finished 15th on track, but he received a post-race five-second time penalty for falling more than ten car lengths behind the safety car.

== Championship standings after the race ==
Drivers' Championship standings

	Pos.	Driver	Points
	1	(Netherlands) Max Verstappen	339
	2	(Mexico) Sergio Pérez	201
	3	(Spain) Fernando Alonso	168
	4	(United Kingdom) Lewis Hamilton	156
2	5	(Spain) Carlos Sainz Jr.	102

Constructors' Championship standings

Pos.	Constructor	Points
1	(Austria) Red Bull Racing-Honda RBPT	540
2	(Germany) Mercedes	255
3	(United Kingdom) Aston Martin Aramco-Mercedes	215
4	(Italy) Ferrari	201
5	(United Kingdom) McLaren-Mercedes	111

- Note: Only the top five positions are included for both sets of standings.

== See also ==
- 2023 Zandvoort Formula 2 round

Previous race: 2023 Belgian Grand Prix	FIA Formula One World Championship; 2023 season	Next race: 2023 Italian Grand Prix
Previous race: 2022 Dutch Grand Prix	Dutch Grand Prix	Next race: 2024 Dutch Grand Prix
