= 2023 Italian Grand Prix =

Formula One motor race

Race 14 of 22 in the 2023 Formula One World Championship
← Previous race	Next race →
- Layout of the Autodromo Nazionale di Monza

Race details
- Date: 3 September 2023
- Official name: Formula 1 Pirelli Gran Premio d'Italia 2023
- Location: Monza Circuit; Monza, Italy
- Course: Permanent racing facility
- Course length: 5.793 km (3.600 miles)
- Distance: 51 laps, 295.134 km (183.388 miles)
- Scheduled distance: 53 laps, 306.720 km (190.587 miles)
- Weather: Sunny
- Attendance: 304,134

Pole position
Driver	(Spain) Carlos Sainz Jr.	Ferrari
- Time: 1:20.294

Fastest lap
Driver	(Australia) Oscar Piastri	McLaren-Mercedes
- Time: 1:25.072 on lap 43

Podium
First	(Netherlands) Max Verstappen	Red Bull Racing-Honda RBPT
Second	(Mexico) Sergio Pérez	Red Bull Racing-Honda RBPT
Third	(Spain) Carlos Sainz Jr.	Ferrari

The 2023 Italian Grand Prix (officially known as the Formula 1 Pirelli Gran Premio d'Italia 2023) was a Formula One motor race held on 3 September 2023 at the Monza Circuit in Monza, Italy. It was the fourteenth round of the 2023 Formula One World Championship.

The race was won by Max Verstappen for Red Bull Racing for his tenth consecutive win in a row, breaking previous Red Bull Racing driver Sebastian Vettel's record of nine consecutive race victories of 2013, and extending Red Bull Racing's consecutive race wins record as a constructor to 15. Verstappen, Sergio Pérez and polesitter Carlos Sainz Jr. of Ferrari made up the podium, Sainz's second podium at Monza Circuit.

== Background ==
The event was held across the weekend of 1–3 September. It was the fourteenth round of the 2023 Formula One World Championship and the 93rd running of the Italian Grand Prix.

=== Championship standings before the race ===
Coming into the weekend, Max Verstappen led the Drivers' Championship by 138 points from teammate Sergio Pérez, with Fernando Alonso third, a further 33 points behind. Red Bull Racing led the Constructors' Championship, leading Mercedes by 285 points and Aston Martin by a further 40 points.

=== Entrants ===
The drivers and teams were the same as the season entry list, with the exception of Liam Lawson, who was in the seat originally held by Nyck de Vries. (Note: Nyck de Vries was originally replaced by Daniel Ricciardo from the Hungarian Grand Prix onwards. Ricciardo was subsequently replaced by Liam Lawson whilst Ricciardo recovered from a broken metacarpal bone which he suffered following a crash during the second practice of the preceding Dutch Grand Prix.) Felipe Drugovich drove for Aston Martin in place of Lance Stroll during the first practice session.

=== Tyre choices ===
Tyre supplier Pirelli brought the C3, C4 and C5 tyre compounds (designated hard, medium, and soft, respectively) for teams to use at the event.

A reduction in allocated tyre sets from the standard 13 to 11, referred to as the Alternative Tyre Allocation (ATA), was trialled again during this Grand Prix, with the intention of making tyre usage more sustainable. This is the second and last time this season that it was trialled after the Hungarian Grand Prix. The usage of tyre compounds during qualifying was mandated as hard in Q1, medium in Q2 and soft in Q3, assuming that the weather is dry.

== Practice ==
Three free practice sessions were held for the event. The first practice session was held on 1 September 2023, at 13:30 local time (UTC+2). Max Verstappen topped the session, with Carlos Sainz Jr. recording the second-fastest time and Sergio Pérez recording the third-fastest.

The second practice session was held later that day at 17:00 local time (UTC+2). It was topped by Carlos Sainz Jr., with Lando Norris recording the second-fastest time and Sergio Pérez recording the third-fastest. The session was red-flagged early when Lance Stroll's fuel system failed, forcing him to sit out the rest of the session. It was later red-flagged again when Sergio Pérez spun into the gravel at turn 11. However, Pérez's crash was late enough in the session to retain the third-fastest time. The third practice session was held on 2 September 2023, at 12:30 local time (UTC+2), with Sainz topping the session ahead of Verstappen and Lewis Hamilton.

== Qualifying ==
Qualifying was held on 2 September 2023, at 16:00 local time (UTC+2).

=== Qualifying report ===
Max Verstappen topped the first session, which was to be set on hard tyres, ahead of Alexander Albon and Charles Leclerc while Zhou Guanyu, Pierre Gasly, Esteban Ocon, Kevin Magnussen and Lance Stroll did not advance to the second session. Zhou, Oscar Piastri, who would recover by recording the eleventh-fastest time, Fernando Alonso and Verstappen had their lap times deleted due to track limits violations.

The second session, set to medium tyres, was also topped by Verstappen, ahead of Leclerc and Carlos Sainz Jr. This time, Yuki Tsunoda, Liam Lawson, Nico Hülkenberg, Valtteri Bottas and Logan Sargeant did not advance to the final qualifying session.

The third session was run on soft tyres. In his fastest lap, Verstappen's left-rear wheel snapped into the gravel but he still set the provisional fastest lap. However, Sainz beat Verstappen to pole by 0.013s, taking pole position in front of the Tifosi.

=== Qualifying classification ===
Pos.	No.	Driver	Constructor	Qualifying times			Final grid
Pos.	No.	Driver	Constructor	Q1	Q2	Q3	Final grid
1	55	(Spain) Carlos Sainz Jr.	Ferrari	1:21.965	1:20.991	1:20.294	1
2	1	(Netherlands) Max Verstappen	Red Bull Racing-Honda RBPT	1:21.573	1:20.937	1:20.307	2
3	16	(Monaco) Charles Leclerc	Ferrari	1:21.788	1:20.977	1:20.361	3
4	63	(United Kingdom) George Russell	Mercedes	1:22.148	1:21.382	1:20.671	4
5	11	(Mexico) Sergio Pérez	Red Bull Racing-Honda RBPT	1:21.911	1:21.240	1:20.688	5
6	23	(Thailand) Alexander Albon	Williams-Mercedes	1:21.661	1:21.272	1:20.760	6
7	81	(Australia) Oscar Piastri	McLaren-Mercedes	1:22.106	1:21.527	1:20.785	7
8	44	(United Kingdom) Lewis Hamilton	Mercedes	1:21.977	1:21.369	1:20.820	8
9	4	(United Kingdom) Lando Norris	McLaren-Mercedes	1:21.995	1:21.581	1:20.979	9
10	14	(Spain) Fernando Alonso	Aston Martin Aramco-Mercedes	1:22.043	1:21.543	1:21.417	10
11	22	(Japan) Yuki Tsunoda	AlphaTauri-Honda RBPT	1:21.852	1:21.594	N/A	11
12	40	(New Zealand) Liam Lawson	AlphaTauri-Honda RBPT	1:22.112	1:21.758	N/A	12
13	27	(Germany) Nico Hülkenberg	Haas-Ferrari	1:22.343	1:21.776	N/A	13
14	77	(Finland) Valtteri Bottas	Alfa Romeo-Ferrari	1:22.249	1:21.940	N/A	14
15	2	(United States) Logan Sargeant	Williams-Mercedes	1:21.930	1:21.944	N/A	15
16	24	(China) Zhou Guanyu	Alfa Romeo-Ferrari	1:22.390	N/A	N/A	16
17	10	(France) Pierre Gasly	Alpine-Renault	1:22.545	N/A	N/A	17
18	31	(France) Esteban Ocon	Alpine-Renault	1:22.548	N/A	N/A	18
19	20	(Denmark) Kevin Magnussen	Haas-Ferrari	1:22.592	N/A	N/A	19
20	18	(Canada) Lance Stroll	Aston Martin Aramco-Mercedes	1:22.860	N/A	N/A	20
107% time: 1:27.283

== Race ==
The race was held on 3 September 2023, and was scheduled at 15:00 local time (UTC+2), but was delayed by 20 minutes due to an aborted start procedure.

=== Race report ===
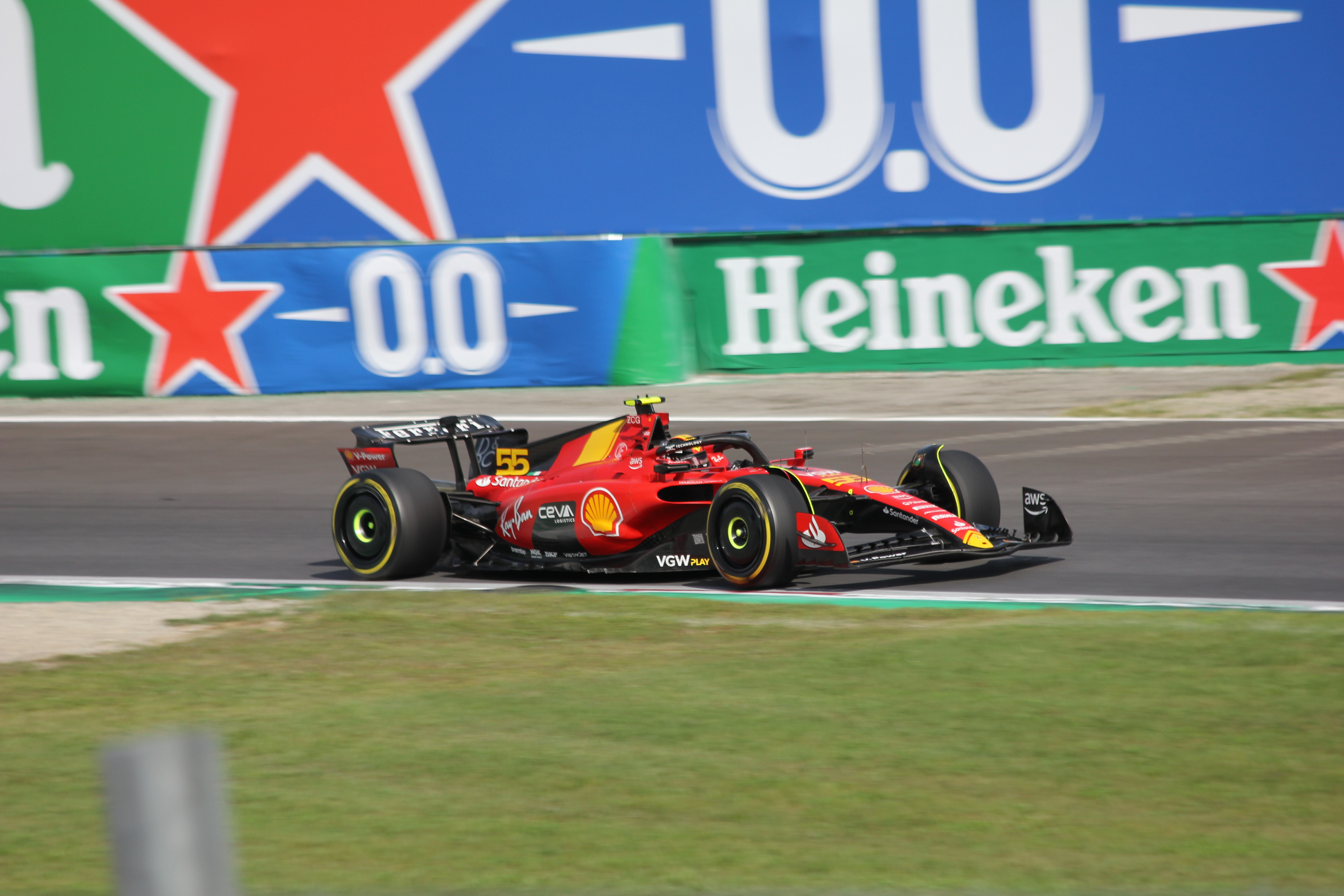
Polesitter Carlos Sainz Jr. during the 2023 Italian Grand Prix

The formation lap was aborted after Yuki Tsunoda broke down on track; his car was wheeled off via truck. Race control declared an aborted start, but Sainz made a mistake similar to what happened a year later in 2024 São Paulo Grand Prix, and led the field away on what he assumed was supposed to be an extra formation lap. Then, following the aborted race start procedure nevertheless, race control imposed a 20-minute delay. A third formation lap was held at the end of the delay, before the race start. As two unscheduled formation laps had taken place, the race distance was reduced by two laps. Polesitter Carlos Sainz Jr. had a good start and held off second-placed Max Verstappen for the first 14 laps. Even when Verstappen was allowed DRS, he was unable to make an overtake as Sainz continued to make a strong defence. Sainz locked up coming into the first corner on lap 15, giving Verstappen a chance. Verstappen eventually passed Sainz and led the race for the next five laps until he came in for a stop. Meanwhile, George Russell and Sergio Pérez were having their own fight for fourth place behind Charles Leclerc. On lap 14, Pérez was able to pass Russell at the first corner, but both cars missed the chicane and Pérez had to give the position back. Due to another incident against Esteban Ocon at the same corner after his stop, in which Russell overtook Ocon off the track, Russell was given a five-second penalty.

Behind Verstappen, who quickly pulled several seconds ahead, the other drivers were having close battles, with Pérez and Leclerc duelling at the second corner. Lewis Hamilton made an error trying to pass Oscar Piastri, cutting across him in the braking zone of turn 4. Piastri's front wing was damaged and he had to make an unscheduled pit stop for repairs. Hamilton was given a five-second penalty for the collision but he had enough of a gap over Alexander Albon at the end to avoid losing any positions when the penalty was applied. Meanwhile, Sainz would run out of room at the first corner. He was forced not to only take the run-off area, but give Pérez second place. As the race was reaching its closing stages, Leclerc locked up twice and almost collided with Sainz. Sainz himself would lock up into the first corner as Verstappen won his second consecutive Italian Grand Prix. With ten consecutive wins since the Miami Grand Prix, this broke Sebastian Vettel's 2013 record of nine consecutive wins in a row – and Red Bull Racing extended their record of most consecutive wins for a constructor to 15, having won every race since the 2022 Abu Dhabi Grand Prix.

=== Race classification ===
Pos.	No.	Driver	Constructor	Laps^{a}	Time/Retired	Grid	Points
1	1	(Netherlands) Max Verstappen	Red Bull Racing-Honda RBPT	51	1:13:41.143	2	25
2	11	(Mexico) Sergio Pérez	Red Bull Racing-Honda RBPT	51	+6.064	5	18
3	55	(Spain) Carlos Sainz Jr.	Ferrari	51	+11.193	1	15
4	16	(Monaco) Charles Leclerc	Ferrari	51	+11.377	3	12
5	63	(United Kingdom) George Russell	Mercedes	51	+23.028^{b}	4	10
6	44	(United Kingdom) Lewis Hamilton	Mercedes	51	+42.679^{c}	8	8
7	23	(Thailand) Alexander Albon	Williams-Mercedes	51	+45.106	6	6
8	4	(United Kingdom) Lando Norris	McLaren-Mercedes	51	+45.449	9	4
9	14	(Spain) Fernando Alonso	Aston Martin Aramco-Mercedes	51	+46.294	10	2
10	77	(Finland) Valtteri Bottas	Alfa Romeo-Ferrari	51	+1:04.056	14	1
11	40	(New Zealand) Liam Lawson	AlphaTauri-Honda RBPT	51	+1:10.638	12	
12	81	(Australia) Oscar Piastri	McLaren-Mercedes	51	+1:13.074^{d}	7	
13	2	(United States) Logan Sargeant	Williams-Mercedes	51	+1:18.557^{e}	15	
14	24	(China) Zhou Guanyu	Alfa Romeo-Ferrari	51	+1:20.164	16	
15	10	(France) Pierre Gasly	Alpine-Renault	51	+1:22.510	17	
16	18	(Canada) Lance Stroll	Aston Martin Aramco-Mercedes	51	+1:27.266	20	
17	27	(Germany) Nico Hülkenberg	Haas-Ferrari	50	+1 lap	13	
18	20	(Denmark) Kevin Magnussen	Haas-Ferrari	50	+1 lap	19	
Ret	31	(France) Esteban Ocon	Alpine-Renault	39	Steering	18	
DNS	22	(Japan) Yuki Tsunoda	AlphaTauri-Honda RBPT	0	Engine	–^{f}	
Fastest lap: (Australia) Oscar Piastri (McLaren-Mercedes) – 1:25.072 (lap 43)

Notes

- ^a – The race distance was scheduled to be 53 laps before being shortened by two laps due to an aborted start procedure.
- ^b – George Russell received a five-second time penalty for leaving the track and gaining an advantage. His final position was not affected by the penalty.
- ^c – Lewis Hamilton received a five-second time penalty for causing a collision with Oscar Piastri. His final position was not affected by the penalty.
- ^d – Oscar Piastri finished 11th, but he received a five-second time penalty for leaving the track and gaining an advantage.
- ^e – Logan Sargeant received a five-second time penalty for causing a collision with Valtteri Bottas. His final position was not affected by the penalty.
- ^f – Yuki Tsunoda did not start the race due to an engine failure during the formation lap. His place on the grid was left vacant.

== Championship standings after the race ==
Drivers' Championship standings

Pos.	Driver	Points
1	(Netherlands) Max Verstappen	364
2	(Mexico) Sergio Pérez	219
3	(Spain) Fernando Alonso	170
4	(United Kingdom) Lewis Hamilton	164
5	(Spain) Carlos Sainz Jr.	117

Constructors' Championship standings

	Pos.	Constructor	Points
	1	(Austria) Red Bull Racing-Honda RBPT	583
	2	(Germany) Mercedes	273
1	3	(Italy) Ferrari	228
1	4	(United Kingdom) Aston Martin Aramco-Mercedes	217
	5	(United Kingdom) McLaren-Mercedes	115

- Note: Only the top five positions are included for both sets of standings.

== See also ==
- 2023 Monza Formula 2 round
- 2023 Monza Formula 3 round

== Notes ==
Previous race: 2023 Dutch Grand Prix	FIA Formula One World Championship; 2023 season	Next race: 2023 Singapore Grand Prix
Previous race: 2022 Italian Grand Prix	Italian Grand Prix	Next race: 2024 Italian Grand Prix
