= 2023 Belgian Grand Prix =

12th round of the 2023 F1 season

Race 12 of 22 in the 2023 Formula One World Championship
← Previous race	Next race →
- Layout of the Circuit de Spa-Francorchamps

Race details
- Date: 30 July 2023
- Official name: Formula 1 MSC Cruises Belgian Grand Prix 2023
- Location: Circuit de Spa-Francorchamps; Stavelot, Belgium
- Course: Permanent racing facility
- Course length: 7.004 km (4.352 miles)
- Distance: 44 laps, 308.052 km (191.415 miles)
- Weather: Partly cloudy, with a rain interval
- Attendance: 380,000

Pole position
Driver	(Monaco) Charles Leclerc (Note: Max Verstappen set the fastest time in qualifying, but he received a five-place grid penalty for a new gearbox driveline. Charles Leclerc was promoted to pole position in his place.)	Ferrari
- Time: 1:46.988

Fastest lap
Driver	(United Kingdom) Lewis Hamilton	Mercedes
- Time: 1:47.305 on lap 44

Podium
First	(Netherlands) Max Verstappen	Red Bull Racing-Honda RBPT
Second	(Mexico) Sergio Pérez	Red Bull Racing-Honda RBPT
Third	(Monaco) Charles Leclerc	Ferrari

The 2023 Belgian Grand Prix (officially known as the Formula 1 MSC Cruises Belgian Grand Prix 2023) was a Formula One motor race that was held on 30 July 2023 at the Circuit de Spa-Francorchamps in Stavelot, Belgium. It was the twelfth round of the 2023 Formula One World Championship and the third Grand Prix weekend of the season to utilise the sprint format.

While Charles Leclerc took pole position for the Grand Prix, Max Verstappen took pole in the sprint shootout and won both the sprint and the Grand Prix itself.

== Background ==
The event was held across the weekend of 28–30 July. The announcement of this date in September 2022 had initially sparked some controversy, as it directly conflicted with the Spa 24 Hours endurance race, hosted by GT World Challenge Europe, which had already been scheduled to run that exact weekend. Eventually the GT race was forced to reschedule, with the 2023 24 Hours of Spa being run in the 29 June to 2 July weekend instead. The Grand Prix was the twelfth round of the 2023 Formula One World Championship and the 79th running of the Belgian Grand Prix. The weekend was the third of six in the season to follow the sprint format.

This was the last race for Alpine team principal Otmar Szafnauer and their sporting director Alan Permane, both of whom left after the race.

=== Championship standings before the race ===
Coming into the weekend, Max Verstappen led the Drivers' Championship by 110 points from teammate Sergio Pérez, with Fernando Alonso third, a further 32 points behind. Red Bull Racing led the Constructors' Championship, leading Mercedes by 229 points and Aston Martin by a further 39 points.

=== Entrants ===
The drivers and teams were the same as the season entry list with the exception of Daniel Ricciardo, who replaced Nyck de Vries at AlphaTauri starting from the preceding Hungarian Grand Prix. However this was the last race for Ricciardo until the United States Grand Prix due to him breaking a metacarpal bone during the second free practice session for the Dutch Grand Prix. Liam Lawson replaced Ricciardo for the interim five Grands Prix.

=== Tyre choices ===
Tyre supplier Pirelli brought the C2, C3 and C4 tyre compounds (designated hard, medium, and soft, respectively) for teams to use at the event.

== Practice ==
The single free practice session was held on 28 July 2023, at 13:30 local time (UTC+2). The session, which was affected by heavy rain, was temporarily red-flagged after Logan Sargeant lost control of his car and crashed into the barriers. The session ended with Carlos Sainz Jr. topping the session behind the McLarens of Oscar Piastri and Lando Norris. Lance Stroll, Pierre Gasly, Esteban Ocon and Max Verstappen did not set times before the session ended.

== Qualifying ==
Qualifying was held on 28 July 2023, and was scheduled at 17:00 local time (UTC+2), but was delayed by ten minutes due to rain. The session determined the starting order for the main race.

=== Qualifying report ===
For the first segment (Q1), Lando Norris damaged his floor after he corrected a small loss of control and drove through the gravel. Teammate Oscar Piastri saw better fortunes by setting the fastest lap momentarily. Max Verstappen allegedly impeded Alexander Albon with no action taken, before going on to take Piastri's spot at the top of the timing sheets. Albon, Zhou Guanyu, Logan Sargeant, Daniel Ricciardo, and Nico Hülkenberg were all knocked out. Hülkenberg suffered hydraulic leaks during the session. Repairs meant he could not set an additional lap.

Intermediates continued to be the chosen rubber of the second session (Q2) before Norris substituted them for soft tyres. Meanwhile, Esteban Ocon ripped the right side of his front wing and ended up joining Yuki Tsunoda, teammate Pierre Gasly, Kevin Magnussen, who would also be given a grid penalty for impeding Charles Leclerc, and the other Alfa Romeo of Valtteri Bottas out of the session, which Piastri momentarily topped with Verstappen in tenth.

The drag reduction system (DRS) was made available to all drivers for the final session (Q3). Verstappen was fastest but carried a five-place grid penalty for new engine components, which meant Charles Leclerc achieved the second pole position of the season for Ferrari ahead of Sergio Pérez and Lewis Hamilton.

=== Qualifying classification ===
Pos.	No.	Driver	Constructor	Qualifying times			Final grid
Pos.	No.	Driver	Constructor	Q1	Q2	Q3	Final grid
1	1	(Netherlands) Max Verstappen	Red Bull Racing-Honda RBPT	1:58.515	1:52.784	1:46.168	6^{a}
2	16	(Monaco) Charles Leclerc	Ferrari	1:58.300	1:52.017	1:46.988	1
3	11	(Mexico) Sergio Pérez	Red Bull Racing-Honda RBPT	1:58.899	1:52.353	1:47.045	2
4	44	(United Kingdom) Lewis Hamilton	Mercedes	1:58.563	1:52.345	1:47.087	3
5	55	(Spain) Carlos Sainz Jr.	Ferrari	1:58.688	1:51.711	1:47.152	4
6	81	(Australia) Oscar Piastri	McLaren-Mercedes	1:58.872	1:51.534	1:47.365	5
7	4	(United Kingdom) Lando Norris	McLaren-Mercedes	1:59.981	1:52.252	1:47.669	7
8	63	(United Kingdom) George Russell	Mercedes	1:59.035	1:52.605	1:47.805	8
9	14	(Spain) Fernando Alonso	Aston Martin Aramco-Mercedes	1:58.834	1:52.751	1:47.843	9
10	18	(Canada) Lance Stroll	Aston Martin Aramco-Mercedes	1:59.663	1:52.193	1:48.841	10
11	22	(Japan) Yuki Tsunoda	AlphaTauri-Honda RBPT	1:59.044	1:53.148	N/A	11
12	10	(France) Pierre Gasly	Alpine-Renault	1:59.511	1:53.671	N/A	12
13	20	(Denmark) Kevin Magnussen	Haas-Ferrari	2:00.020	1:54.160	N/A	16^{b}
14	77	(Finland) Valtteri Bottas	Alfa Romeo-Ferrari	1:59.484	1:54.694	N/A	13
15	31	(France) Esteban Ocon	Alpine-Renault	1:59.634	1:56.372	N/A	14
16	23	(Thailand) Alexander Albon	Williams-Mercedes	2:00.314	N/A	N/A	15
17	24	(China) Zhou Guanyu	Alfa Romeo-Ferrari	2:00.832	N/A	N/A	17
18	2	(United States) Logan Sargeant	Williams-Mercedes	2:01.535	N/A	N/A	18
19	3	(Australia) Daniel Ricciardo	AlphaTauri-Honda RBPT	2:02.159	N/A	N/A	19
20	27	(Germany) Nico Hülkenberg	Haas-Ferrari	2:03.166	N/A	N/A	PL^{c}
107% time: 2:06.581

Notes

- ^a – Max Verstappen received a five-place grid penalty for a new gearbox driveline.
- ^b – Kevin Magnussen received a three-place grid penalty for impeding Charles Leclerc in Q2.
- ^c – Nico Hülkenberg qualified 20th, but he was required to start the race from the pit lane as the new elements were changed without the approval of the technical delegate during the parc fermé.

== Sprint shootout ==
The sprint shootout was held on 29 July 2023, and was scheduled at 12:00 local time (UTC+2), but was delayed by 35 minutes due to rain. The session determined the starting order for the sprint race.

=== Sprint shootout report ===
The first segment, SQ1, would get underway with all cars on the intermediate compound. The wet track offered wildly differing fortunes for the teams. The Aston Martin team, which had shown success previously in the season, struggled early on before Fernando Alonso became the second-fastest driver by the session's end. Lance Stroll looked to be at threat of being knocked out, but would scrape through into SQ2. The McLarens of Lando Norris and Oscar Piastri also found themselves lacking pace, with Norris only thirteenth fastest. Yuki Tsunoda, Valtteri Bottas, Kevin Magnussen, Zhou Guanyu and Nico Hülkenberg – the latter failing to take advantage of the changing conditions and being inconvenienced due to an issue with the Haas pit crew's front jack – were all out in SQ1. Max Verstappen topped timing chart of the session.

The second segment, SQ2, was red-flagged after Stroll crashed. He was unable to set a time. He had switched to medium tyres on a wet track and was suffering from a lack of grip. While Daniel Ricciardo was able to set a lap, the red flag greatly inconvenienced Stroll's teammate Alonso, Alexander Albon and Logan Sargeant, who were all knocked out – this being the first time Alonso's first time did not progress to the third segment of a qualification this season.

Confusion arose after the FIA was revealed to have not declared the track to have been wet during SQ2, which led to Stroll switching to mediums despite the wet track and subsequently crashing and destroying the front section of his car during his outlap. As per sprint shootout regulations, teams must use a specific tyre compound during each segment; mediums in SQ1 and SQ2, and softs in SQ3. The track was wet during the session and as such the regulation did not apply. Fifteen minutes before the session began, FIA sporting director Steve Nielsen announced that the track would not be declared wet. A previous instance of such changing conditions was displayed in the Austrian Grand Prix earlier in the year.

The third segment, SQ3, saw everyone put on the softs as the track dried out. Verstappen was second behind Lewis Hamilton, but improved his time and achieved the pole position for the sprint race, with his teammate Sergio Pérez in eighth. Piastri bettered his British Grand Prix qualifying result by qualifying second, 0.011 seconds off of polesitter Verstappen.

=== Sprint shootout classification ===
Pos.	No.	Driver	Constructor	Qualifying times			Sprint grid
Pos.	No.	Driver	Constructor	SQ1	SQ2	SQ3	Sprint grid
1	1	(Netherlands) Max Verstappen	Red Bull Racing-Honda RBPT	1:58.135	1:55.200	1:49.056	1
2	81	(Australia) Oscar Piastri	McLaren-Mercedes	2:00.056	1:56.392	1:49.067	2
3	55	(Spain) Carlos Sainz Jr.	Ferrari	1:59.414	1:56.557	1:49.081	3
4	16	(Monaco) Charles Leclerc	Ferrari	1:59.575	1:56.265	1:49.251	4
5	4	(United Kingdom) Lando Norris	McLaren-Mercedes	2:00.436	1:56.828	1:49.389	5
6	10	(France) Pierre Gasly	Alpine-Renault	2:00.032	1:56.137	1:49.700	6
7	44	(United Kingdom) Lewis Hamilton	Mercedes	1:58.939	1:55.823	1:49.900	7
8	11	(Mexico) Sergio Pérez	Red Bull Racing-Honda RBPT	1:59.362	1:55.878	1:49.961	8
9	31	(France) Esteban Ocon	Alpine-Renault	1:59.884	1:57.051	1:50.494	9
10	63	(United Kingdom) George Russell	Mercedes	2:00.475	1:57.393	1:55.742	10
11	3	(Australia) Daniel Ricciardo	AlphaTauri-Honda RBPT	2:00.177	1:57.687	N/A	11
12	23	(Thailand) Alexander Albon	Williams-Mercedes	1:59.198	No time	N/A	12
13	2	(United States) Logan Sargeant	Williams-Mercedes	2:00.031	No time	N/A	13
14	18	(Canada) Lance Stroll	Aston Martin Aramco-Mercedes	2:00.460	No time	N/A	14
15	14	(Spain) Fernando Alonso	Aston Martin Aramco-Mercedes	1:59.038	No time	N/A	15
16	22	(Japan) Yuki Tsunoda	AlphaTauri-Honda RBPT	2:00.568	N/A	N/A	16
17	77	(Finland) Valtteri Bottas	Alfa Romeo-Ferrari	2:00.951	N/A	N/A	17
18	20	(Denmark) Kevin Magnussen	Haas-Ferrari	2:01.079	N/A	N/A	18
19	24	(China) Zhou Guanyu	Alfa Romeo-Ferrari	2:01.430	N/A	N/A	19
107% time: 2:06.404
—	27	(Germany) Nico Hülkenberg	Haas-Ferrari	No time	N/A	N/A	20^{a}

Notes

- ^a – Nico Hülkenberg failed to set a time during the sprint shootout, but he was permitted to race in the sprint at the stewards' discretion.

== Sprint ==
The sprint was held on 29 July 2023. It was scheduled at 16:30 local time (UTC+2), but was delayed by one hour and five minutes due to the delay of the sprint shootout and rain.

=== Sprint report ===
The sprint began with all cars on full wet tyres after four formation laps behind the safety car. When the safety car went into the pits, with the race distance reduced to 11 laps after the extra formation laps, Oscar Piastri, Carlos Sainz Jr., Pierre Gasly, Lewis Hamilton, Sergio Pérez, Daniel Ricciardo, Alexander Albon, Lance Stroll, Valtteri Bottas, and Nico Hülkenberg pitted to switch to intermediate tires. Max Verstappen led until the second lap, when he and the rest of the field switched to intermediates.

On lap 3, Fernando Alonso lost control of his car on the kerb of turn 12 and spun into the gravel. He could not recover the car, prompting his first retirement of the season and a safety car period to recover Alonso's car. It went in at the end of lap 5, and Verstappen passed Piastri down the Kemmel Straight. Verstappen would keep the lead, which he extended to six seconds as he crossed the line.

Hamilton and Pérez banged wheels through turn 17 while fighting for fourth position, leaving Hamilton ahead after Pérez suffered damage to his right-hand sidepod. After Pérez was overtaken by Sainz and Charles Leclerc, he ran into the gravel on the next lap at turn 15 and tumbled down the order before eventually retiring.

Max Verstappen, Oscar Piastri, and Pierre Gasly were the top three. This is Gasly's first top-three finish since the 2021 Azerbaijan Grand Prix, and Piastri's first top-three finish in his Formula One career. Lewis Hamilton crossed the line in fourth but dropped to seventh after receiving a five-second time penalty for causing the collision with Pérez. This promoted Sainz to fourth, Leclerc to fifth, and Norris to sixth. Russell grabbed the final points-scoring position.

=== Sprint classification ===
Pos.	No.	Driver	Constructor	Laps^{a}	Time/Retired	Grid	Points
1	1	(Netherlands) Max Verstappen	Red Bull Racing-Honda RBPT	11	24:58.433	1	8
2	81	(Australia) Oscar Piastri	McLaren-Mercedes	11	+6.677	2	7
3	10	(France) Pierre Gasly	Alpine-Renault	11	+10.733	6	6
4	55	(Spain) Carlos Sainz Jr.	Ferrari	11	+12.648	3	5
5	16	(Monaco) Charles Leclerc	Ferrari	11	+15.016	4	4
6	4	(United Kingdom) Lando Norris	McLaren-Mercedes	11	+16.052	5	3
7	44	(United Kingdom) Lewis Hamilton	Mercedes	11	+16.757^{b}	7	2
8	63	(United Kingdom) George Russell	Mercedes	11	+16.822	10	1
9	31	(France) Esteban Ocon	Alpine-Renault	11	+22.410	9	
10	3	(Australia) Daniel Ricciardo	AlphaTauri-Honda RBPT	11	+22.806	11	
11	18	(Canada) Lance Stroll	Aston Martin Aramco-Mercedes	11	+25.007	14	
12	23	(Thailand) Alexander Albon	Williams-Mercedes	11	+26.303	12	
13	77	(Finland) Valtteri Bottas	Alfa Romeo-Ferrari	11	+27.006	17	
14	20	(Denmark) Kevin Magnussen	Haas-Ferrari	11	+32.986	18	
15	24	(China) Zhou Guanyu	Alfa Romeo-Ferrari	11	+36.342	19	
16	2	(United States) Logan Sargeant	Williams-Mercedes	11	+37.571^{c}	13	
17	27	(Germany) Nico Hülkenberg	Haas-Ferrari	11	+37.827	20	
18	22	(Japan) Yuki Tsunoda	AlphaTauri-Honda RBPT	11	+39.267	16	
Ret	11	(Mexico) Sergio Pérez	Red Bull Racing-Honda RBPT	8	Collision damage	8	
Ret	14	(Spain) Fernando Alonso	Aston Martin Aramco-Mercedes	2	Accident	15	
Fastest lap: (Netherlands) Max Verstappen (Red Bull Racing-Honda RBPT) – 1:58.943 (lap 6)

Notes

- ^a – The sprint distance was scheduled to be 15 laps before being shortened by four laps due to an aborted start procedure.
- ^b – Lewis Hamilton finished fourth, but he received a five-second time penalty for causing a collision with Sergio Pérez.
- ^c – Logan Sargeant finished 14th, but he received a five-second time penalty for speeding in the pit lane.

== Race ==
The race was held on 30 July 2023, at 15:00 local time (UTC+2).

=== Race report ===
As the lights went out, Charles Leclerc held onto his first position into the first corner. Carlos Sainz Jr. locked up heading into turn 1, colliding with Oscar Piastri, who was attempting to overtake Sainz up the inside, and forcing Piastri's McLaren against the inside wall. Piastri suffered suspension damage and retired on the first lap, briefly bringing out yellow flags before the race continued. Sainz also suffered damage to his sidepod but was told to adjust his aero balance and keep holding onto fifth place. The collision was not investigated. Piastri and Sainz blamed each other for the incident.

Sergio Pérez passed Leclerc on the Kemmel straight and quickly built a gap of more than a second. On lap 6, Max Verstappen, who started from sixth after a gearbox penalty, overtook third-place Hamilton on the same straight. On lap 9, Verstappen overtook Leclerc into turn 7 to claim second place. Meanwhile, Sainz, still suffering from earlier damage to his car, dropped down several places behind Fernando Alonso, Yuki Tsunoda, Alexander Albon, and Logan Sargeant.

Pérez and Leclerc pitted on lap 14, Pérez suffered a slight delay due to a malfunctioning wheel gun. Verstappen's quicker pit stop on the next lap meant that Pérez's lead was cut down to 1.5 seconds. On lap 17, Verstappen passed Pérez on the Kemmel straight to take the lead, which he would retain for the rest of the race.

A brief rain shower arrived on lap 20, but no driver pitted for intermediate tires, though Lance Stroll ended his first stint on the medium tires and switched to soft tires. As the race reached its halfway mark of 22 laps, Sainz pitted to retire due to significant earlier damage.

By lap 31, all drivers had pitted twice except for George Russell, Pierre Gasly, and Lance Stroll. Esteban Ocon overtook Tsunoda for ninth and Stroll for eighth. In the final laps of the race, Lewis Hamilton stopped for a third time, retaining his position, changing to fresh medium tires in a successful attempt to take the fastest lap point from Verstappen on the final lap.

Verstappen took the checkered flag to win by 22 seconds from Pérez, followed by Leclerc, Hamilton, Alonso, Russell, Lando Norris, Ocon, and Stroll. After a quick pit stop, Norris was running as low as seventeenth before recovering ten positions to finish in seventh. Tsunoda rounded out the points-scoring positions, earning AlphaTauri their first points since the Azerbaijan Grand Prix.

=== Race classification ===
Pos.	No.	Driver	Constructor	Laps	Time/Retired	Grid	Points
1	1	(Netherlands) Max Verstappen	Red Bull Racing-Honda RBPT	44	1:22:30.450	6	25
2	11	(Mexico) Sergio Pérez	Red Bull Racing-Honda RBPT	44	+22.305	2	18
3	16	(Monaco) Charles Leclerc	Ferrari	44	+32.259	1	15
4	44	(United Kingdom) Lewis Hamilton	Mercedes	44	+49.671	3	13^{a}
5	14	(Spain) Fernando Alonso	Aston Martin Aramco-Mercedes	44	+56.184	9	10
6	63	(United Kingdom) George Russell	Mercedes	44	+1:03.101	8	8
7	4	(United Kingdom) Lando Norris	McLaren-Mercedes	44	+1:13.719	7	6
8	31	(France) Esteban Ocon	Alpine-Renault	44	+1:14.719	14	4
9	18	(Canada) Lance Stroll	Aston Martin Aramco-Mercedes	44	+1:19.340	10	2
10	22	(Japan) Yuki Tsunoda	AlphaTauri-Honda RBPT	44	+1:20.221	11	1
11	10	(France) Pierre Gasly	Alpine-Renault	44	+1:23.084	12	
12	77	(Finland) Valtteri Bottas	Alfa Romeo-Ferrari	44	+1:25.191	13	
13	24	(China) Zhou Guanyu	Alfa Romeo-Ferrari	44	+1:35.441	17	
14	23	(Thailand) Alexander Albon	Williams-Mercedes	44	+1:36.184	15	
15	20	(Denmark) Kevin Magnussen	Haas-Ferrari	44	+1:41.754	16	
16	3	(Australia) Daniel Ricciardo	AlphaTauri-Honda RBPT	44	+1:43.071	19	
17	2	(United States) Logan Sargeant	Williams-Mercedes	44	+1:44.476	18	
18	27	(Germany) Nico Hülkenberg	Haas-Ferrari	44	+1:50.450	PL	
Ret	55	(Spain) Carlos Sainz Jr.	Ferrari	23	Collision damage	4	
Ret	81	(Australia) Oscar Piastri	McLaren-Mercedes	0	Collision damage	5	
Fastest lap: (United Kingdom) Lewis Hamilton (Mercedes) – 1:47.305 (lap 44)

Notes

- ^a – Includes one point for fastest lap.

== Championship standings after the race ==
Drivers' Championship standings

	Pos.	Driver	Points
	1	(Netherlands) Max Verstappen	314
	2	(Mexico) Sergio Pérez	189
	3	(Spain) Fernando Alonso	149
	4	(United Kingdom) Lewis Hamilton	148
2	5	(Monaco) Charles Leclerc	99

Constructors' Championship standings

Pos.	Constructor	Points
1	(Austria) Red Bull Racing-Honda RBPT	503
2	(Germany) Mercedes	247
3	(United Kingdom) Aston Martin Aramco-Mercedes	196
4	(Italy) Ferrari	191
5	(United Kingdom) McLaren-Mercedes	103

- Note: Only the top five positions are included for both sets of standings.

== See also ==
- 2023 Spa-Francorchamps Formula 2 round
- 2023 Spa-Francorchamps Formula 3 round

== Notes ==
Previous race: 2023 Hungarian Grand Prix	FIA Formula One World Championship; 2023 season	Next race: 2023 Dutch Grand Prix
Previous race: 2022 Belgian Grand Prix	Belgian Grand Prix	Next race: 2024 Belgian Grand Prix
