= 1985 Dutch Grand Prix =

- Race 11 of 16 in the 1985 Formula One World Championship
- The Zandvoort Circuit (1980–1989)

Race details
- Date: 25 August 1985
- Official name: XXXII Grote Prijs van Nederland
- Location: Circuit Zandvoort, Zandvoort, Netherlands
- Course: Permanent racing facility
- Course length: 4.252 km (2.642 miles)
- Distance: 70 laps, 297.640 km (184.945 miles)
- Weather: Sunny

Pole position
Driver	(Brazil) Nelson Piquet	Brabham-BMW
- Time: 1:11.074

Fastest lap
Driver	(France) Alain Prost	McLaren-TAG
- Time: 1:16.538 on lap 57 (lap record)

Podium
First	(Austria) Niki Lauda	McLaren-TAG
Second	(France) Alain Prost	McLaren-TAG
Third	(Brazil) Ayrton Senna	Lotus-Renault

The 1985 Dutch Grand Prix was a Formula One motor race held at Circuit Zandvoort on 25 August 1985. It was the eleventh round of the 1985 FIA Formula One World Championship and the 34th World Championship Grand Prix to be held in the Netherlands. The race was held over 70 laps of the four kilometre circuit for a race distance of 298 kilometres. The race also proved to be the 25th and final Grand Prix victory for triple World Champion Niki Lauda, driving a McLaren-TAG. Lauda's teammate Alain Prost was second, with Brazilian racer Ayrton Senna third in his Lotus-Renault. However, it was also to be the last Dutch Grand Prix for 36 years. It was planned to be re-introduced in 2020, on a revised Zandvoort circuit, however the re-introduction was postponed due to the COVID-19 pandemic, which would be eventually cancelled. The first race back at Zandvoort eventually turned out to be in 2021, won by Max Verstappen, the nation's first World Champion.

It was also the last Grand Prix for West German Stefan Bellof, who was killed the following week at the 1000 km of Spa World Sportscar race.

== Race summary ==
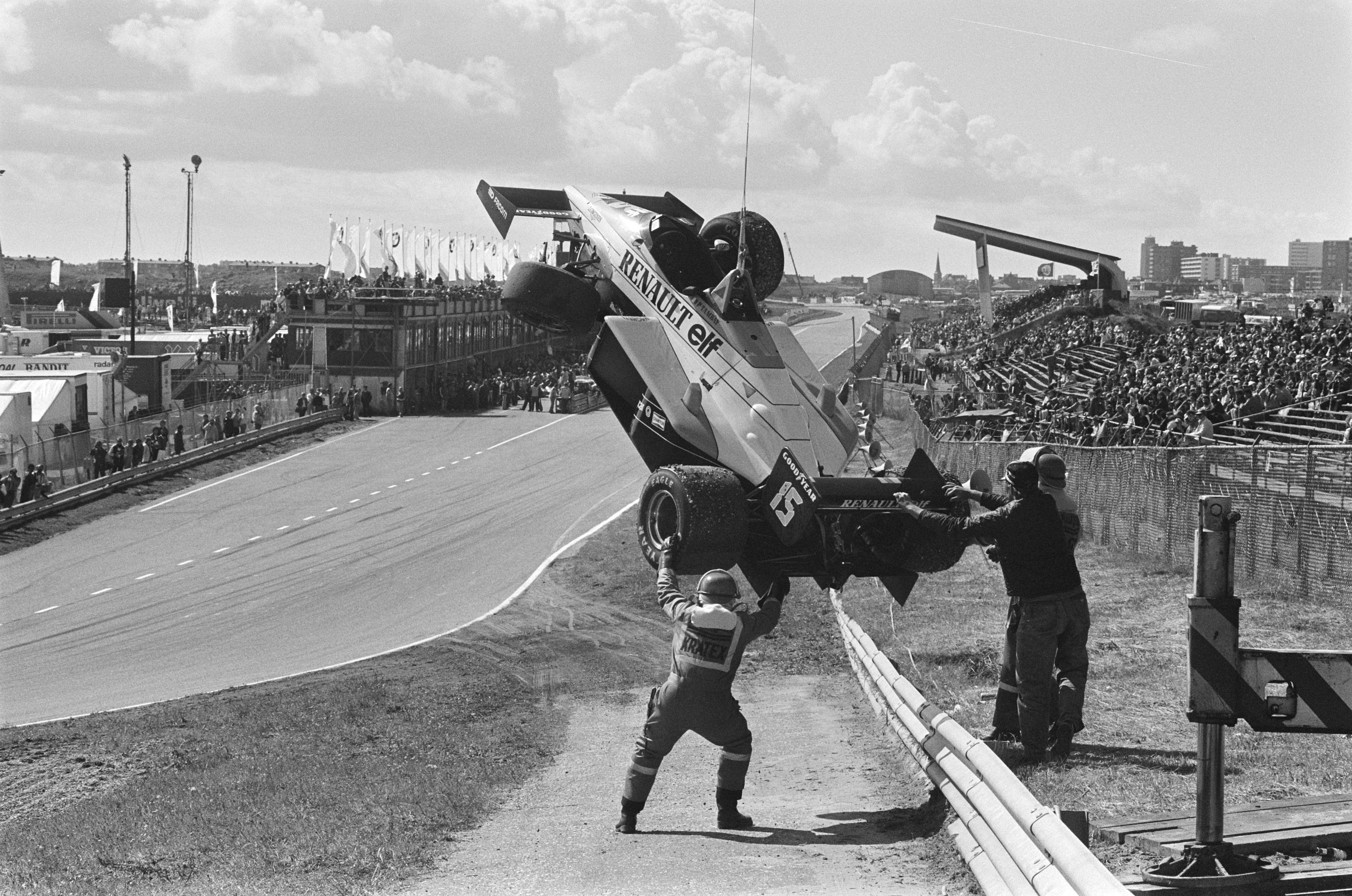
Tambay's Renault being recovered after the accident during the warm-up session

Renault's Patrick Tambay, who qualified sixth, had a huge crash at nearly 322 km/h (200 mph) in the Sunday morning warm-up following a suspension failure on the start-finish straight. Tambay escaped shaken but unhurt, and took the start in the spare car.

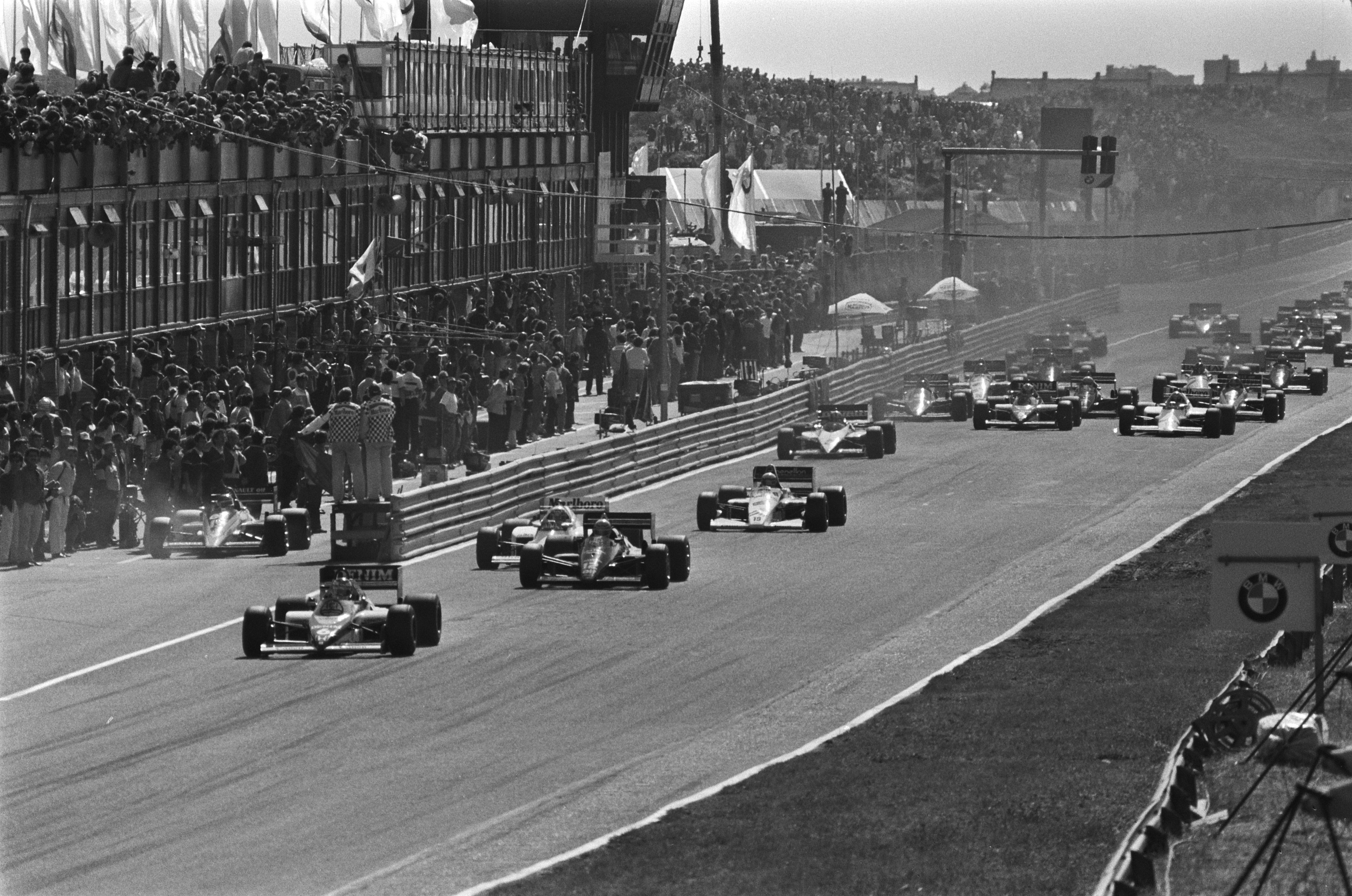
Rosberg took the lead ahead of Senna, Prost and Fabi, while Piquet's Brabham stalled at the start

Nelson Piquet recorded his first and only pole position of the season, averaging 215.369 km/h (133.824 mph), the first for tyre manufacturer Pirelli. However, he stalled his Brabham at the start and was eventually push-started, almost a lap behind the leaders. He eventually finished eighth.

Niki Lauda took his 25th and final Grand Prix win in his McLaren-TAG. His teammate Alain Prost finished second, only 0.232 seconds behind; the two had diced for the lead over the final twelve laps of the race. Ayrton Senna continued his late-season charge by finishing third in his Lotus, albeit 48 seconds behind the McLarens; he finished just ahead of Prost's Drivers' Championship rival Michele Alboreto in the Ferrari. Senna's teammate Elio de Angelis was fifth, with Williams's Nigel Mansell taking the final point for sixth.

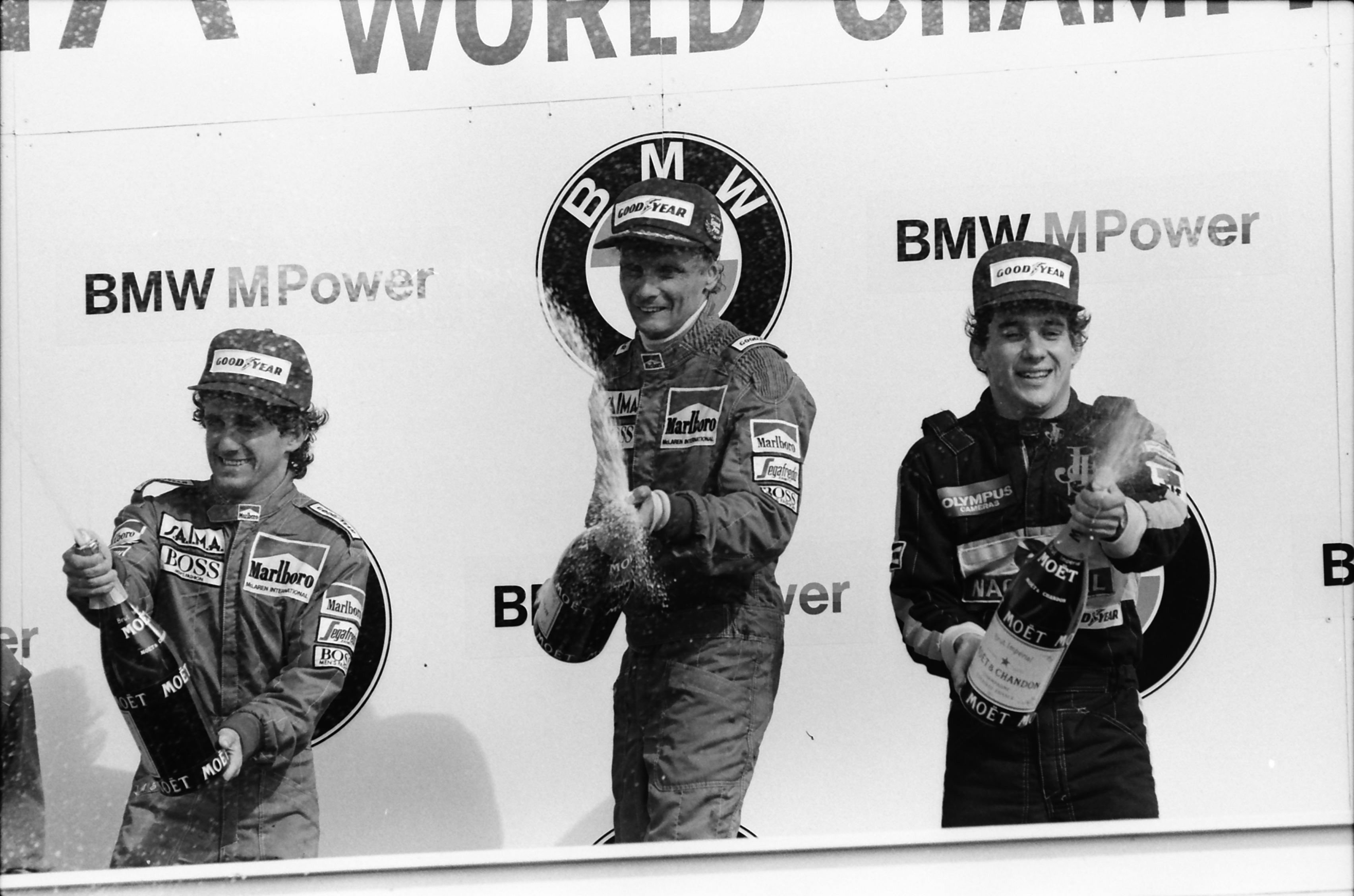
The podium celebration after the race

Following his car destroying crash at the previous race in Austria, this was also the last time Andrea de Cesaris appeared in a Ligier. It would in fact be the Italian's last race of the season.

== Classification ==
=== Qualifying ===
Pos	No	Driver	Constructor	Q1	Q2	Gap
1	7	(Brazil) Nelson Piquet	Brabham-BMW	1:11.074		—
2	6	(Finland) Keke Rosberg	Williams-Honda	1:11.647		+0.573
3	2	(France) Alain Prost	McLaren-TAG	1:11.801	1:29.507	+0.727
4	12	(Brazil) Ayrton Senna	Lotus-Renault	1:11.837		+0.763
5	19	(Italy) Teo Fabi	Toleman-Hart	1:12.310		+1.236
6	15	(France) Patrick Tambay	Renault	1:12.486		+1.412
7	5	(United Kingdom) Nigel Mansell	Williams-Honda	1:12.614	1:32.740	+1.540
8	18	(Belgium) Thierry Boutsen	Arrows-BMW	1:12.746		+1.672
9	8	(Switzerland) Marc Surer	Brabham-BMW	1:12.856		+1.782
10	1	(Austria) Niki Lauda	McLaren-TAG	1:13.059		+1.985
11	11	(Italy) Elio de Angelis	Lotus-Renault	1:13.078	1:30.123	+2.004
12	16	(United Kingdom) Derek Warwick	Renault	1:13.289		+2.215
13	26	(France) Jacques Laffite	Ligier-Renault	1:13.435	1:28.393	+2.361
14	17	(Austria) Gerhard Berger	Arrows-BMW	1:13.680	1:34.857	+2.606
15	20	(Italy) Piercarlo Ghinzani	Toleman-Hart	1:13.705		+2.631
16	27	(Italy) Michele Alboreto	Ferrari	1:13.725		+2.651
17	28	(Sweden) Stefan Johansson	Ferrari	1:13.768	1:32.544	+2.694
18	25	(Italy) Andrea de Cesaris	Ligier-Renault	1:13.797	1:34.638	+2.723
19	22	(Italy) Riccardo Patrese	Alfa Romeo	1:14.240		+3.166
20	23	(United States) Eddie Cheever	Alfa Romeo	1:14.912	1:32.572	+3.838
21	3	(United Kingdom) Martin Brundle	Tyrrell-Renault	1:14.920	1:32.003	+3.846
22	4	(West Germany) Stefan Bellof	Tyrrell-Renault	1:15.236		+4.162
23	30	(United Kingdom) Jonathan Palmer	Zakspeed	1:16.257	1:34.316	+5.183
24	29	(Italy) Pierluigi Martini	Minardi-Motori Moderni	1:17.919	1:38.227	+6.845
25	10	(France) Philippe Alliot	RAM-Hart	1:18.525	1:36.270	+7.451
26	24	(Netherlands) Huub Rothengatter	Osella-Alfa Romeo	1:19.410	1:38.149	+8.336
DNQ	9	(United Kingdom) Kenny Acheson	RAM-Hart	1:20.429		+9.355

=== Race ===
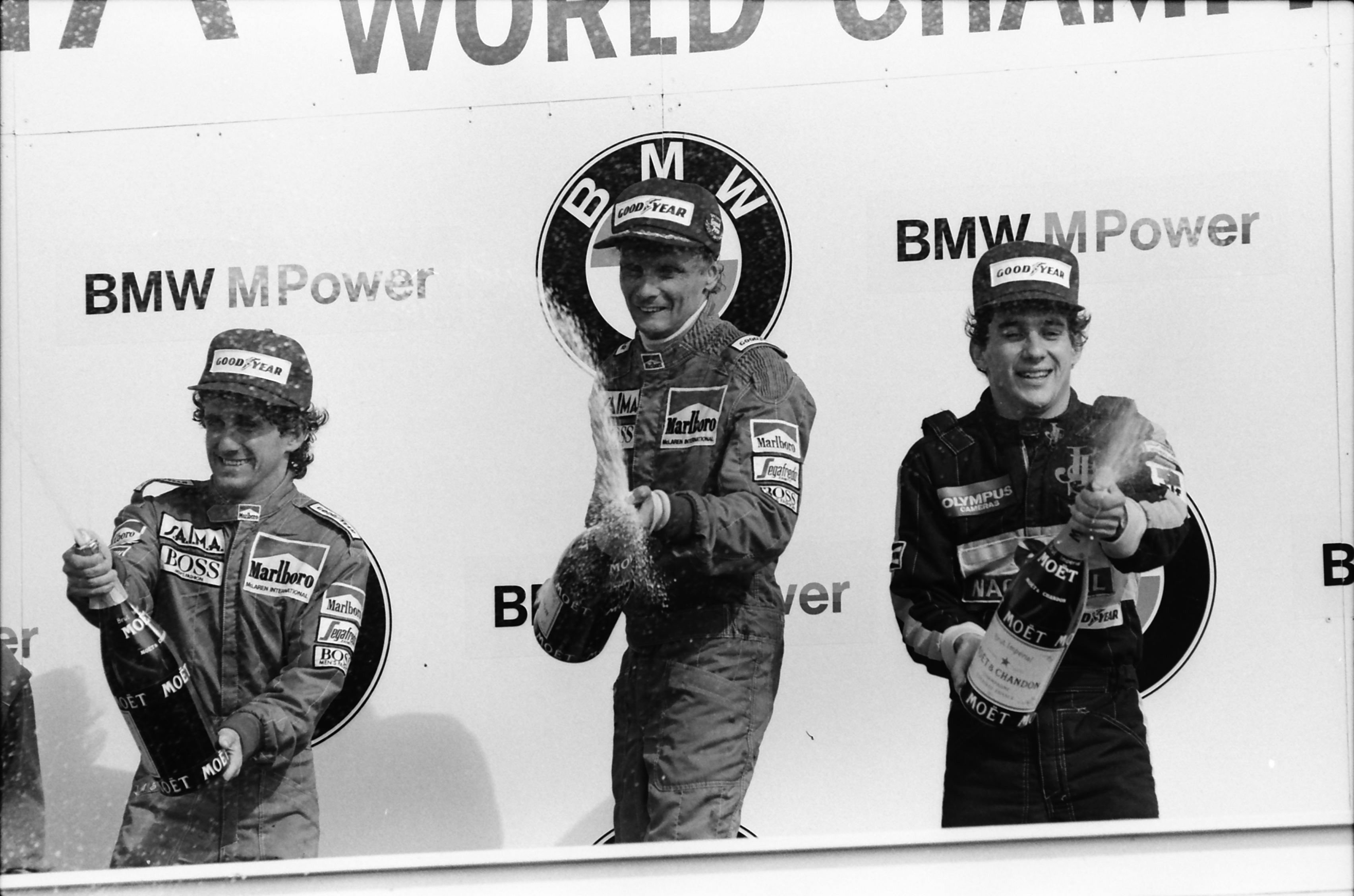
The podium with Alain Prost, Niki Lauda (last win) and Ayrton Senna.

Pos	No	Driver	Constructor	Tyre	Laps	Time/Retired	Grid	Points
1	1	(Austria) Niki Lauda	McLaren-TAG	G	70	1:32:29.263	10	9
2	2	(France) Alain Prost	McLaren-TAG	G	70	+ 0.232	3	6
3	12	(Brazil) Ayrton Senna	Lotus-Renault	G	70	+ 48.491	4	4
4	27	(Italy) Michele Alboreto	Ferrari	G	70	+ 48.837	16	3
5	11	(Italy) Elio de Angelis	Lotus-Renault	G	69	+ 1 lap	11	2
6	5	(United Kingdom) Nigel Mansell	Williams-Honda	G	69	+ 1 lap	7	1
7	3	(United Kingdom) Martin Brundle	Tyrrell-Renault	G	69	+ 1 lap	21	
8	7	(Brazil) Nelson Piquet	Brabham-BMW	P	69	+ 1 lap	1	
9	17	(Austria) Gerhard Berger	Arrows-BMW	G	68	+ 2 laps	14	
10	8	(Switzerland) Marc Surer	Brabham-BMW	P	65	Exhaust	9	
NC	24	(Netherlands) Huub Rothengatter	Osella-Alfa Romeo	P	56	+ 14 laps	26	
Ret	18	(Belgium) Thierry Boutsen	Arrows-BMW	G	54	Suspension	8	
Ret	9	(France) Philippe Alliot	RAM-Hart	P	52	Engine	25	
Ret	4	(West Germany) Stefan Bellof	Tyrrell-Renault	G	39	Engine	22	
Ret	16	(United Kingdom) Derek Warwick	Renault	G	27	Gearbox	12	
Ret	25	(Italy) Andrea de Cesaris	Ligier-Renault	P	25	Turbo	18	
Ret	15	(France) Patrick Tambay	Renault	G	22	Transmission	6	
Ret	6	(Finland) Keke Rosberg	Williams-Honda	G	20	Engine	2	
Ret	19	(Italy) Teo Fabi	Toleman-Hart	P	18	Wheel bearing	5	
Ret	26	(France) Jacques Laffite	Ligier-Renault	P	17	Electrical	13	
Ret	30	(United Kingdom) Jonathan Palmer	Zakspeed	G	13	Oil pressure	23	
Ret	20	(Italy) Piercarlo Ghinzani	Toleman-Hart	P	12	Engine	15	
Ret	28	(Sweden) Stefan Johansson	Ferrari	G	9	Engine	17	
Ret	29	(Italy) Pierluigi Martini	Minardi-Motori Moderni	P	1	Accident	24	
Ret	23	(United States) Eddie Cheever	Alfa Romeo	G	1	Turbo	20	
Ret	22	(Italy) Riccardo Patrese	Alfa Romeo	G	1	Turbo	19	

== Championship standings after the race ==
Drivers' Championship standings

Pos	Driver	Points
1	(France) Alain Prost	56
2	(Italy) Michele Alboreto	53
3	(Italy) Elio de Angelis	30
4	(Brazil) Ayrton Senna	19
5	(Sweden) Stefan Johansson	19

Constructors' Championship standings

Pos	Constructor	Points
1	(Italy) Ferrari	75
2	(United Kingdom) McLaren-TAG	70
3	(United Kingdom) Lotus-Renault	49
4	(United Kingdom) Williams-Honda	25
5	(United Kingdom) Brabham-BMW	15

- Note: Only the top five positions are included for both sets of standings.

Previous race: 1985 Austrian Grand Prix	FIA Formula One World Championship; 1985 season	Next race: 1985 Italian Grand Prix
Previous race: 1984 Dutch Grand Prix	Dutch Grand Prix	Next race: 2021 Dutch Grand Prix; 2020 edition cancelled
