= 2021 Dutch Grand Prix =

13th round of the 2021 Formula One season

Race 13 of 22 in the 2021 Formula One World Championship
← Previous race	Next race →
- Layout of Circuit Zandvoort

Race details
- Date: 5 September 2021
- Official name: Formula 1 Heineken Dutch Grand Prix 2021
- Location: Circuit Zandvoort, Zandvoort, Netherlands
- Course: Permanent racing facility
- Course length: 4.259 km (2.646 miles)
- Distance: 72 laps, 306.587 km (190.504 miles)
- Weather: Sunny
- Attendance: 195,000

Pole position
Driver	(Netherlands) Max Verstappen	Red Bull Racing-Honda
- Time: 1:08.885

Fastest lap
Driver	(United Kingdom) Lewis Hamilton	Mercedes
- Time: 1:11.097 on lap 72 (lap record)

Podium
First	(Netherlands) Max Verstappen	Red Bull Racing-Honda
Second	(United Kingdom) Lewis Hamilton	Mercedes
Third	(Finland) Valtteri Bottas	Mercedes

The 2021 Dutch Grand Prix (officially known as the Formula 1 Heineken Dutch Grand Prix 2021) was a Formula One motor race held on 5 September 2021 at Circuit Zandvoort. It was the thirteenth round of the 2021 Formula One World Championship and the first Dutch Grand Prix to take place since 1985. The race was won by Max Verstappen – prior to him, no Dutch driver had won or gone to the podium at their home race.

== Background ==
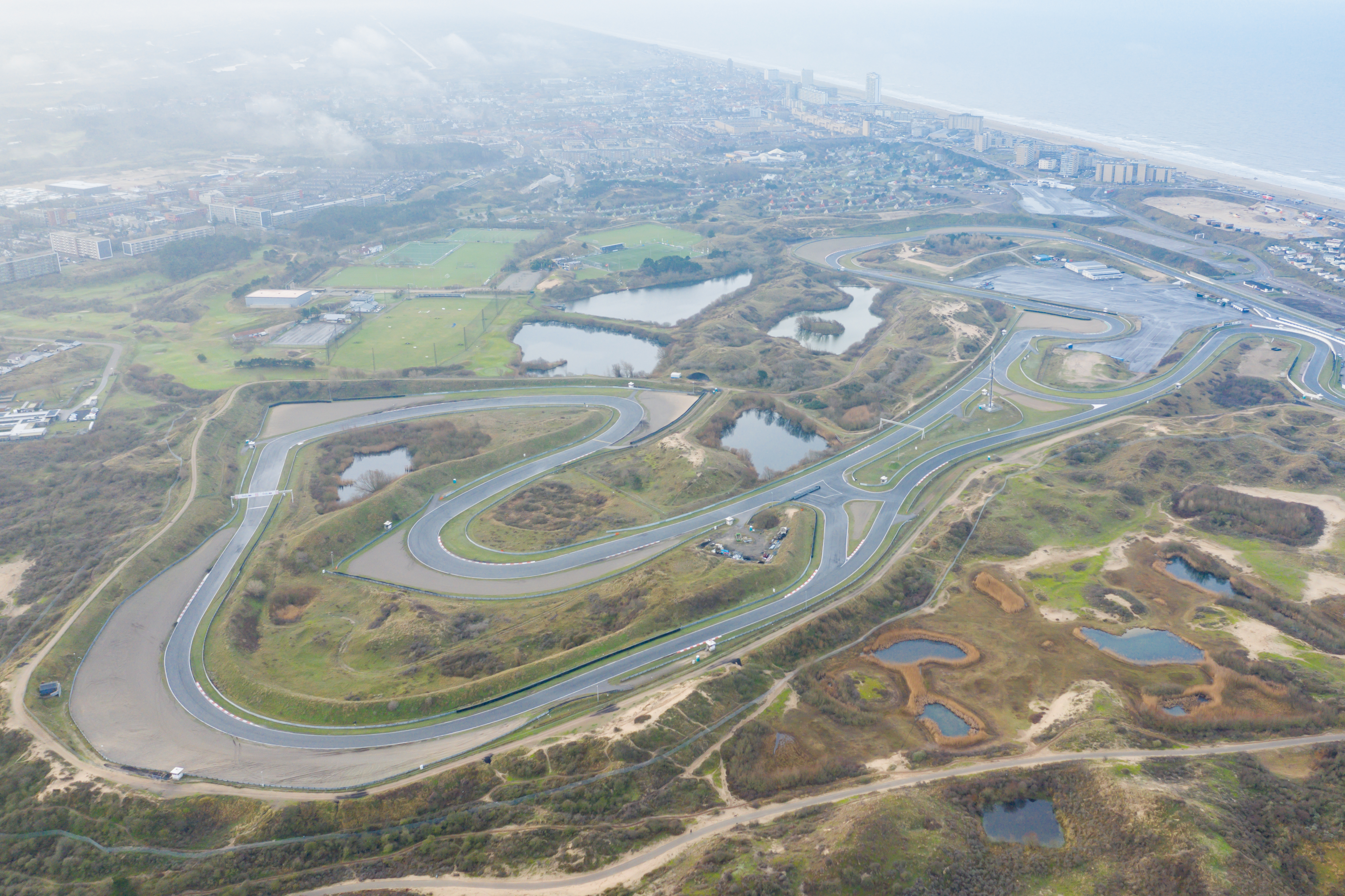
Circuit Zandvoort in 2018, prior to renovations.

The event, which was held over the weekend of 3–5 September at Circuit Zandvoort, was the thirteenth round of the 2021 World Championship. The race took place one week after the Belgian Grand Prix and preceded the Italian Grand Prix.

=== Track layout ===
The circuit has a total length of 4.259 kilometres (2.646 mi), consisting of 14 corners and two DRS zones. As one of the shorter tracks on the Formula One calendar, the drivers complete 72 laps resulting in a total race distance of 306.587 kilometres (190.504 mi). The track was changed to upgrade it to FIA Grade 1 specifications and was a different layout compared to when F1 last raced in 1985.

=== Championship standings before the race ===
After the Belgian Grand Prix handed out half-points due to heavy rainfall, Lewis Hamilton's championship lead was reduced to just three points to Verstappen in second. For the second race in a row, Lando Norris, Valtteri Bottas and Sergio Pérez all scored no points, meaning they stayed third, fourth and fifth respectively. Mercedes also led the Constructors' Championship by 7 points to Red Bull. McLaren regained third place after Daniel Ricciardo scored six points. Ferrari trailed McLaren by 3.5 points and Alpine sat in fifth place.

=== Entrants ===
The drivers and teams were initially the same as the season entry list with no additional stand-in drivers for the race.

Before the third practice session, Alfa Romeo Racing driver Kimi Räikkönen tested positive for coronavirus. He was replaced by the reserve driver Robert Kubica, who last raced at the 2019 Abu Dhabi Grand Prix, driving for Williams.

Williams team principal Jost Capito also had to go into isolation following a dinner with Räikkönen the night before.

=== Tyre choices ===
Sole tyre supplier Pirelli allocated the C1, C2, and C3 compounds of tyre to be used in the race.

== Practice ==
Free practice 1 took place at 11:30 CEST on 3 September, while free practice 2 took place at 15:00 CEST on the same day. Free practice 3 took place at 12:00 CEST on 4 September. All three practice sessions lasted for one hour.

The first session ended with Lewis Hamilton fastest for Mercedes ahead of Red Bull's Max Verstappen and Ferrari's Carlos Sainz Jr. The session was red flagged for 35 minutes after an engine failure of Aston Martin's Sebastian Vettel.

The second session ended with Charles Leclerc fastest for Ferrari ahead of his teammate Carlos Sainz Jr. and Alpine's Esteban Ocon. The session was red flagged for nine minutes after a loss of power for Mercedes driver Lewis Hamilton. The session was also red flagged for Haas's Nikita Mazepin after he spun into a gravel trap. Verstappen was investigated by the stewards for overtaking another driver during the first red flag period of the session, though the stewards ultimately decided a penalty was not necessary.

== Qualifying ==
Qualifying took place at 15:00 CEST on 4 September.

=== Qualifying classification ===
Pos.	No.	Driver	Constructor	Qualifying times			Final grid
Pos.	No.	Driver	Constructor	Q1	Q2	Q3	Final grid
1	33	(Netherlands) Max Verstappen	Red Bull Racing-Honda	1:10.036	1:09.071	1:08.885	1
2	44	(United Kingdom) Lewis Hamilton	Mercedes	1:10.114	1:09.976	1:08.923	2
3	77	(Finland) Valtteri Bottas	Mercedes	1:10.219	1:09.769	1:09.222	3
4	10	(France) Pierre Gasly	AlphaTauri-Honda	1:10.274	1:09.541	1:09.478	4
5	16	(Monaco) Charles Leclerc	Ferrari	1:09.829	1:09.437	1:09.527	5
6	55	(Spain) Carlos Sainz Jr.	Ferrari	1:10.022	1:09.870	1:09.537	6
7	99	(Italy) Antonio Giovinazzi	Alfa Romeo Racing-Ferrari	1:10.050	1:10.033	1:09.590	7
8	31	(France) Esteban Ocon	Alpine-Renault	1:10.179	1:09.919	1:09.933	8
9	14	(Spain) Fernando Alonso	Alpine-Renault	1:10.435	1:10.020	1:09.956	9
10	3	(Australia) Daniel Ricciardo	McLaren-Mercedes	1:10.255	1:09.865	1:10.166	10
11	63	(United Kingdom) George Russell	Williams-Mercedes	1:10.382	1:10.332	N/A	11
12	18	(Canada) Lance Stroll	Aston Martin-Mercedes	1:10.438	1:10.367	N/A	12
13	4	(United Kingdom) Lando Norris	McLaren-Mercedes	1:10.489	1:10.406	N/A	13
14	6	(Canada) Nicholas Latifi	Williams-Mercedes	1:10.093	1:11.161	N/A	PL^{1}
15	22	(Japan) Yuki Tsunoda	AlphaTauri-Honda	1:10.462	1:11.314	N/A	14
16	11	(Mexico) Sergio Pérez	Red Bull Racing-Honda	1:10.530	N/A	N/A	PL^{2}
17	5	(Germany) Sebastian Vettel	Aston Martin-Mercedes	1:10.731	N/A	N/A	15
18	88	(Poland) Robert Kubica	Alfa Romeo Racing-Ferrari	1:11.301	N/A	N/A	16
19	47	(Germany) Mick Schumacher	Haas-Ferrari	1:11.387	N/A	N/A	17
20	9	(Russian Automobile Federation) Nikita Mazepin (Note: Nikita Mazepin is Russian, but he competed as a neutral competitor using the designation RAF (Russian Automobile Federation), as the Court of Arbitration for Sport upheld a ban on Russia competing at World Championships. The ban was implemented by the World Anti-Doping Agency in response to the state-sponsored doping program of Russian athletes.)	Haas-Ferrari	1:11.875	N/A	N/A	18
107% time: 1:14.717

- ^1 – Nicholas Latifi received a five-place grid penalty for an unscheduled gearbox change. He was then required to start the race from the pit lane for a front wing change and nose assembly in parc fermé.
- ^2 – Sergio Pérez was required to start the race from the back of the grid for exceeding his quota of power unit elements. He was then required to start the race from the pit lane for a new energy store specification.

== Race ==
The race started at 15:00 CEST on 5 September.

=== Race classification ===
Pos.	No.	Driver	Constructor	Laps	Time/Retired	Grid	Points
1	33	(Netherlands) Max Verstappen	Red Bull Racing-Honda	72	1:30:05.395	1	25
2	44	(United Kingdom) Lewis Hamilton	Mercedes	72	+20.932	2	19^{1}
3	77	(Finland) Valtteri Bottas	Mercedes	72	+56.460	3	15
4	10	(France) Pierre Gasly	AlphaTauri-Honda	71	+1 lap	4	12
5	16	(Monaco) Charles Leclerc	Ferrari	71	+1 lap	5	10
6	14	(Spain) Fernando Alonso	Alpine-Renault	71	+1 lap	9	8
7	55	(Spain) Carlos Sainz Jr.	Ferrari	71	+1 lap	6	6
8	11	(Mexico) Sergio Pérez	Red Bull Racing-Honda	71	+1 lap	PL	4
9	31	(France) Esteban Ocon	Alpine-Renault	71	+1 lap	8	2
10	4	(United Kingdom) Lando Norris	McLaren-Mercedes	71	+1 lap	13	1
11	3	(Australia) Daniel Ricciardo	McLaren-Mercedes	71	+1 lap	10	
12	18	(Canada) Lance Stroll	Aston Martin-Mercedes	70	+2 laps	12	
13	5	(Germany) Sebastian Vettel	Aston Martin-Mercedes	70	+2 laps	15	
14	99	(Italy) Antonio Giovinazzi	Alfa Romeo Racing-Ferrari	70	+2 laps	7	
15	88	(Poland) Robert Kubica	Alfa Romeo Racing-Ferrari	70	+2 laps	16	
16	6	(Canada) Nicholas Latifi	Williams-Mercedes	70	+2 laps	PL	
17^{2}	63	(United Kingdom) George Russell	Williams-Mercedes	69	Battery	11	
18	47	(Germany) Mick Schumacher	Haas-Ferrari	69	+3 laps	17	
Ret	22	(Japan) Yuki Tsunoda	AlphaTauri-Honda	48	Engine	14	
Ret	9	(Russian Automobile Federation) Nikita Mazepin	Haas-Ferrari	41	Water leak	18	
Fastest lap: (United Kingdom) Lewis Hamilton (Mercedes) – 1:11.097 (lap 72)

Notes

- ^1 – Includes one point for fastest lap.
- ^2 – George Russell was classified as he completed more than 90% of the race distance.

== Championship standings after the race ==
Drivers' Championship standings

	Pos.	Driver	Points
1	1	(Netherlands) Max Verstappen	224.5
1	2	(United Kingdom) Lewis Hamilton	221.5
1	3	(Finland) Valtteri Bottas	123
1	4	(United Kingdom) Lando Norris	114
Unchanged	5	(Mexico) Sergio Pérez	108

Constructors' Championship standings

	Pos.	Constructor	Points
Unchanged	1	(Germany) Mercedes	344.5
Unchanged	2	(Austria) Red Bull Racing-Honda	332.5
1	3	(Italy) Ferrari	181.5
1	4	(United Kingdom) McLaren-Mercedes	170
Unchanged	5	(France) Alpine-Renault	90

- Note: Only the top five positions are included for both sets of standings.

== See also ==
- 2021 Zandvoort FIA Formula 3 round
- 2021 W Series Zandvoort round

== Notes ==
Previous race: 2021 Belgian Grand Prix	FIA Formula One World Championship; 2021 season	Next race: 2021 Italian Grand Prix
Previous race: 1985 Dutch Grand Prix; 2020 edition cancelled	Dutch Grand Prix	Next race: 2022 Dutch Grand Prix
