= 2022 Dutch Grand Prix =

Fifteenth round of the 2022 F1 season

Race 15 of 22 in the 2022 Formula One World Championship
← Previous race	Next race →
- Layout of Circuit Zandvoort

Race details
- Date: 4 September 2022
- Official name: Formula 1 Heineken Dutch Grand Prix 2022
- Location: Circuit Zandvoort; Zandvoort, Netherlands
- Course: Permanent racing facility
- Course length: 4.259 km (2.646 miles)
- Distance: 72 laps, 306.587 km (190.504 miles)
- Weather: Partly cloudy
- Attendance: 305,000

Pole position
Driver	(Netherlands) Max Verstappen	Red Bull Racing-RBPT
- Time: 1:10.342

Fastest lap
Driver	(Netherlands) Max Verstappen	Red Bull Racing-RBPT
- Time: 1:13.652 on lap 62

Podium
First	(Netherlands) Max Verstappen	Red Bull Racing-RBPT
Second	(United Kingdom) George Russell	Mercedes
Third	(Monaco) Charles Leclerc	Ferrari

The 2022 Dutch Grand Prix (officially known as the Formula 1 Heineken Dutch Grand Prix 2022) was a Formula One motor race held on 4 September 2022 at Circuit Zandvoort in Zandvoort, Netherlands. The race was won by defending winner Max Verstappen.

The race ran over a distance of 72 laps and was the 34th overall running of the Dutch Grand Prix and the 32nd time the event has been held as part of the Formula One World Championship, as well as the 32nd World Championship race held at Circuit Zandvoort.

== Background ==
The event was held across the weekend of the 2–4 September. It was the fifteenth round of the 2022 Formula One World Championship.

=== Championship standings before the race ===
Max Verstappen led the Drivers' Championship by 93 points from teammate Sergio Pérez, with Charles Leclerc third, a further 5 points behind. Red Bull Racing team led the Constructors' Championship, leading Ferrari by 118 points and Mercedes by 159 points.

=== Entrants ===
The drivers and teams were the same as the season entry list with no additional stand-in drivers for the race.

=== Tyre choices ===
Tyre supplier Pirelli brought the C1, C2, and C3 tyre compounds (designated hard, medium, and soft, respectively) for teams to use at the event.

=== Track changes ===
The second DRS activation point was moved further back, being positioned 40 metres (130 ft) after turn 13. As a result, the second DRS detection point was moved further back, being established 20 metres (66 ft) after turn 12.

== Practice ==
There were three practice sessions. The first two were held on 2 September. The first practice started at 12:30 local time (UTC+02:00) and ended with George Russell fastest, followed by Lewis Hamilton and Carlos Sainz Jr. The second practice session was scheduled to held on 16:00, but was delayed to 16:15 due to two red flag periods during qualifying for the Formula 2 support race. Charles Leclerc was fastest, ahead of Sainz and Hamilton. The third practice session took place on 3 September, starting on 12:00 local time. Leclerc was fastest in the session, followed by Russell and Verstappen.

== Qualifying ==
Qualifying took place on 3 September, starting at 15:00 local time.

=== Qualifying classification ===
Pos.	No.	Driver	Constructor	Qualifying times			Final grid
Pos.	No.	Driver	Constructor	Q1	Q2	Q3	Final grid
1	1	(Netherlands) Max Verstappen	Red Bull Racing-RBPT	1:11.317	1:10.927	1:10.342	1
2	16	(Monaco) Charles Leclerc	Ferrari	1:11.443	1:10.988	1:10.363	2
3	55	(Spain) Carlos Sainz Jr.	Ferrari	1:11.767	1:10.814	1:10.434	3
4	44	(United Kingdom) Lewis Hamilton	Mercedes	1:11.331	1:11.075	1:10.648	4
5	11	(Mexico) Sergio Pérez	Red Bull Racing-RBPT	1:11.641	1:11.314	1:11.077	5
6	63	(United Kingdom) George Russell	Mercedes	1:11.561	1:10.824	1:11.147	6
7	4	(United Kingdom) Lando Norris	McLaren-Mercedes	1:11.556	1:11.116	1:11.174	7
8	47	(Germany) Mick Schumacher	Haas-Ferrari	1:11.741	1:11.420	1:11.442	8
9	22	(Japan) Yuki Tsunoda	AlphaTauri-RBPT	1:11.427	1:11.428	1:12.556	9
10	18	(Canada) Lance Stroll	Aston Martin Aramco-Mercedes	1:11.568	1:11.416	No time	10
11	10	(France) Pierre Gasly	AlphaTauri-RBPT	1:11.705	1:11.512	N/A	11
12	31	(France) Esteban Ocon	Alpine-Renault	1:11.748	1:11.605	N/A	12
13	14	(Spain) Fernando Alonso	Alpine-Renault	1:11.667	1:11.613	N/A	13
14	24	(China) Zhou Guanyu	Alfa Romeo-Ferrari	1:11.826	1:11.704	N/A	14
15	23	(Thailand) Alexander Albon	Williams-Mercedes	1:11.695	1:11.802	N/A	15
16	77	(Finland) Valtteri Bottas	Alfa Romeo-Ferrari	1:11.961	N/A	N/A	16
17	3	(Australia) Daniel Ricciardo	McLaren-Mercedes	1:12.081	N/A	N/A	17
18	20	(Denmark) Kevin Magnussen	Haas-Ferrari	1:12.319	N/A	N/A	18
19	5	(Germany) Sebastian Vettel	Aston Martin Aramco-Mercedes	1:12.391	N/A	N/A	19
20	6	(Canada) Nicholas Latifi	Williams-Mercedes	1:13.353	N/A	N/A	20
107% time: 1:16.309

== Race ==
=== Race report ===
The race took place on 4 September, starting at 15:00 CEST, and lasting 72 laps. Verstappen lead away from pole, with Leclerc, Sainz and Hamilton behind. Kevin Magnussen scraped the barriers on lap 2, demoting him to the back of the field. On lap 18, Carlos Sainz Jr. had a slow pit stop as his tyres were not ready; the mechanics also misplaced the spare wheel gun in an unsafe position which Pérez ran over. The slow pitstop demoted Sainz to eleventh. On lap 45, Yuki Tsunoda's AlphaTauri pulled over with an issue on the front-left tyre. Tsunoda was told to continue and came in a lap later, for a change of tyres and to tighten his seatbelt, which he had loosened as he prepared to abandon his car. On lap 47, Tsunoda retired with a differential issue. This brought out a virtual safety car, allowing Verstappen to make a pit stop to keep the lead ahead of the two Mercedes. On lap 55, Valtteri Bottas retired with an engine issue, bringing out a full safety car. Hamilton stayed out, while Verstappen and Russell pitted for softs. Verstappen overtook Hamilton at the restart almost immediately, while Sainz received a five-second penalty for an unsafe release during his pit stop. After Russell made a split-second decision to pit again for faster softs, he overtook Hamilton, who fell to fourth after being overtaken by Leclerc as well. The final standings saw Verstappen in first place, winning the 30th race in his career and the fourth race in a row, ahead of Russell in second and Leclerc in third. Sainz’s penalty demoted him from fifth to eighth. The race was viewed as Hamilton’s best chance of victory, but because of the bad strategy call, he didn’t even finish on the podium.

=== Post race ===
Following the race, a conspiracy theory emerged accusing Red Bull Racing strategist Hannah Schmitz of conspiring with sister team AlphaTauri to ensure a favourable result for Verstappen, after questioning the nature of Tsunoda's retirement on lap 47 which helped Verstappen take a pit stop with a reduced time loss, due to the virtual safety car. This followed the post-race comments of Mercedes team boss Toto Wolff who openly admitted to being suspicious about the circumstances of Tsunoda's retirement saying he was left "speechless" by the incident and that he may have had inspected the incident more closely had his driver Lewis Hamilton been a realistic contender to win the drivers championship. AlphaTauri responded to the accusations, stating Tsunoda's car had a genuine problem the team was initially not aware of. Media sources also criticised the conspiracy theories surrounding Tsunoda's retirement. The incident was looked into by race stewards, whose only action was to reprimand Tsunoda for having his belts undone.

=== Race classification ===
Pos.	No.	Driver	Constructor	Laps	Time/Retired	Grid	Points
1	1	(Netherlands) Max Verstappen	Red Bull Racing-RBPT	72	1:36:42.773	1	26^{1}
2	63	(United Kingdom) George Russell	Mercedes	72	+4.071	6	18
3	16	(Monaco) Charles Leclerc	Ferrari	72	+10.929	2	15
4	44	(United Kingdom) Lewis Hamilton	Mercedes	72	+13.016	4	12
5	11	(Mexico) Sergio Pérez	Red Bull Racing-RBPT	72	+18.168	5	10
6	14	(Spain) Fernando Alonso	Alpine-Renault	72	+18.754	13	8
7	4	(United Kingdom) Lando Norris	McLaren-Mercedes	72	+19.306	7	6
8	55	(Spain) Carlos Sainz Jr.	Ferrari	72	+20.916^{2}	3	4
9	31	(France) Esteban Ocon	Alpine-Renault	72	+21.117	12	2
10	18	(Canada) Lance Stroll	Aston Martin Aramco-Mercedes	72	+22.459	10	1
11	10	(France) Pierre Gasly	AlphaTauri-RBPT	72	+27.009	11	
12	23	(Thailand) Alexander Albon	Williams-Mercedes	72	+30.390	15	
13	47	(Germany) Mick Schumacher	Haas-Ferrari	72	+32.995	8	
14	5	(Germany) Sebastian Vettel	Aston Martin Aramco-Mercedes	72	+36.007^{3}	19	
15	20	(Denmark) Kevin Magnussen	Haas-Ferrari	72	+36.869	18	
16	24	(China) Zhou Guanyu	Alfa Romeo-Ferrari	72	+37.320	14	
17	3	(Australia) Daniel Ricciardo	McLaren-Mercedes	72	+37.764	17	
18	6	(Canada) Nicholas Latifi	Williams-Mercedes	71	+1 lap	20	
Ret	77	(Finland) Valtteri Bottas	Alfa Romeo-Ferrari	53	Engine	16	
Ret	22	(Japan) Yuki Tsunoda	AlphaTauri-RBPT	43	Differential	9	
Fastest lap: (Netherlands) Max Verstappen (Red Bull Racing-RBPT) – 1:13.652 (lap 62)

Notes

- ^1 – Includes one point for fastest lap.
- ^2 – Carlos Sainz Jr. finished fifth, but he received a five-second time penalty for an unsafe release.
- ^3 – Sebastian Vettel finished 13th, but he received a five-second time penalty for ignoring blue flags.

== Championship standings after the race ==
Drivers' Championship standings

	Pos.	Driver	Points
	1	(Netherlands) Max Verstappen	310
1	2	(Monaco) Charles Leclerc	201
1	3	(Mexico) Sergio Pérez	201
1	4	(United Kingdom) George Russell	188
1	5	(Spain) Carlos Sainz Jr.	175

Constructors' Championship standings

Pos.	Constructor	Points
1	(Austria) Red Bull Racing-RBPT	511
2	(Italy) Ferrari	376
3	(Germany) Mercedes	346
4	(France) Alpine-Renault	125
5	(United Kingdom) McLaren-Mercedes	101

- Note: Only the top five positions are included for both sets of standings.

== See also ==
- 2022 Zandvoort Formula 2 round
- 2022 Zandvoort Formula 3 round

Previous race: 2022 Belgian Grand Prix	FIA Formula One World Championship; 2022 season	Next race: 2022 Italian Grand Prix
Previous race: 2021 Dutch Grand Prix	Dutch Grand Prix	Next race: 2023 Dutch Grand Prix
