= 2022 Italian Grand Prix =

Sixteenth round of the 2022 F1 season

Race 16 of 22 in the 2022 Formula One World Championship
| ← Previous race | Next race → |
- Layout of the Autodromo Nazionale di Monza

Race details
- Date: 11 September 2022
- Official name: Formula 1 Pirelli Gran Premio d'Italia 2022
- Location: Monza Circuit; Monza, Italy
- Course: Permanent racing facility
- Course length: 5.793 km (3.600 miles)
- Distance: 53 laps, 306.720 km (190.587 miles)
- Weather: Sunny
- Attendance: 336,647

Pole position
| Driver | (Monaco) Charles Leclerc | Ferrari |
- Time: 1:20.161

Fastest lap
| Driver | (Mexico) Sergio Pérez | Red Bull Racing-RBPT |
- Time: 1:24.030 on lap 46

Podium
| First | (Netherlands) Max Verstappen | Red Bull Racing-RBPT |
| Second | (Monaco) Charles Leclerc | Ferrari |
| Third | (United Kingdom) George Russell | Mercedes |

The 2022 Italian Grand Prix (officially known as the Formula 1 Pirelli Gran Premio d'Italia 2022) was a Formula One motor race held on 11 September 2022 at the Monza Circuit in Monza, Italy. The race finished with a controversial safety car period and was won by Max Verstappen, with Charles Leclerc and George Russell taking second and third place respectively. The race also featured the debut of Nyck de Vries, who scored points with a ninth place driving for Williams.

== Background ==
The event was held across the weekend of the 9–11 September. It was the sixteenth round of the 2022 Formula One World Championship. A minute's silence was held before the first practice session on Friday, and the race on Sunday in tribute to Queen Elizabeth II, who died on 8 September 2022. Several teams further commemorated the Queen on their livery, including Red Bull Racing, Aston Martin, Haas, Ferrari, and Mercedes. Ferrari also used a special livery to commemorate the 75th anniversary of the car company.

=== Championship standings before the race ===
Heading into the event, Max Verstappen led the Drivers' Championship by 109 points from Charles Leclerc, second, and teammate Sergio Pérez, third. Red Bull Racing team led the Constructors' Championship, leading Ferrari by 135 points and Mercedes by 165 points.

=== Entrants ===
The drivers and teams were initially the same as the season entry list with no additional stand-in drivers for the race. Antonio Giovinazzi drove for Haas in place of Mick Schumacher, while Nyck de Vries drove for Aston Martin in place of Sebastian Vettel, during the first practice session. De Vries was called up to race for Williams in place of Alexander Albon as he was ruled out with appendicitis before the third practice session. The Grand Prix marked the 349th race start for Fernando Alonso, equalling Kimi Räikkönen's record for most Formula One starts.

=== Tyre choices ===
Tyre supplier Pirelli brought the C2, C3, and C4 tyre compounds (designated hard, medium, and soft, respectively) for teams to use at the event.

=== Penalties ===
AlphaTauri's Yuki Tsunoda carried a 10-place grid penalty for exceeding his quota of reprimand limits at the previous round, the Dutch Grand Prix.

=== Track changes ===
The second DRS detection point was moved further down the track, now being positioned 20 metres (66 ft) after Parabolica exit, rather than before the entry to this curve as published earlier.

=== Fan harassment and event mismanagement ===
During the weekend there were numerous allegations of management issues and fan harassment. One Twitter user has reported a local fan demanded that fans remove items declaring their support of Max Verstappen. Another video showed several fans making a sexist tone against Sophie Kumpen, Verstappen's mother. Race organisers were criticised for a lack of security in the grandstands.

Several fans also complained about the mismanagement of the event. The circuit organisers demanded food and drink to be paid in token coin instead of cash or credit card. Fans had to wait for more than two hours for food to be prepared following a website crash.

== Practice ==
There were three practice sessions for the event. The first practice session started on 9 September at 14:00 local time (UTC+02:00) and ended with Charles Leclerc fastest, followed by Carlos Sainz Jr. and George Russell. The second practice session, which started at 17:00, ended with Sainz fastest, followed by Max Verstappen and Leclerc. The third practice session, which started on 10 September at 13:00 local time, ended with Verstappen fastest, followed by Leclerc and Sergio Pérez.

== Qualifying ==
Qualifying took place on 10 September at 16:00 local time. Charles Leclerc took pole position with Max Verstappen qualifying second and Carlos Sainz Jr. third.

=== Qualifying classification ===
| Pos. | No. | Driver | Constructor | Qualifying times | | | Final grid |
| Pos. | No. | Driver | Constructor | Q1 | Q2 | Q3 | Final grid |
|---|---|---|---|---|---|---|---|
| 1 | 16 | (Monaco) Charles Leclerc | Ferrari | 1:21.280 | 1:21.208 | 1:20.161 | 1 |
| 2 | 1 | (Netherlands) Max Verstappen | Red Bull Racing-RBPT | 1:20.922 | 1:21.265 | 1:20.306 | 7^{a} |
| 3 | 55 | (Spain) Carlos Sainz Jr. | Ferrari | 1:21.348 | 1:20.878 | 1:20.429 | 18^{b} |
| 4 | 11 | (Mexico) Sergio Pérez | Red Bull Racing-RBPT | 1:21.495 | 1:21.358 | 1:21.206 | 13^{c} |
| 5 | 44 | (United Kingdom) Lewis Hamilton | Mercedes | 1:22.048 | 1:21.708 | 1:21.524 | 19^{d} |
| 6 | 63 | (United Kingdom) George Russell | Mercedes | 1:21.785 | 1:21.747 | 1:21.542 | 2 |
| 7 | 4 | (United Kingdom) Lando Norris | McLaren-Mercedes | 1:22.130 | 1:21.831 | 1:21.584 | 3 |
| 8 | 3 | (Australia) Daniel Ricciardo | McLaren-Mercedes | 1:22.139 | 1:21.855 | 1:21.925 | 4 |
| 9 | 10 | (France) Pierre Gasly | AlphaTauri-RBPT | 1:22.010 | 1:22.062 | 1:22.648 | 5 |
| 10 | 14 | (Spain) Fernando Alonso | Alpine-Renault | 1:22.089 | 1:21.861 | No time | 6 |
| 11 | 31 | (France) Esteban Ocon | Alpine-Renault | 1:22.166 | 1:22.130 | N/A | 14^{e} |
| 12 | 77 | (Finland) Valtteri Bottas | Alfa Romeo-Ferrari | 1:22.254 | 1:22.235 | N/A | 15^{f} |
| 13 | 45 | (Netherlands) Nyck de Vries | Williams-Mercedes | 1:22.567 | 1:22.471 | N/A | 8 |
| 14 | 24 | (China) Zhou Guanyu | Alfa Romeo-Ferrari | 1:22.003 | 1:22.577 | N/A | 9 |
| 15 | 22 | (Japan) Yuki Tsunoda | AlphaTauri-RBPT | 1:22.020 | No time | N/A | 20^{g} |
| 16 | 6 | (Canada) Nicholas Latifi | Williams-Mercedes | 1:22.587 | N/A | N/A | 10 |
| 17 | 5 | (Germany) Sebastian Vettel | Aston Martin Aramco-Mercedes | 1:22.636 | N/A | N/A | 11 |
| 18 | 18 | (Canada) Lance Stroll | Aston Martin Aramco-Mercedes | 1:22.748 | N/A | N/A | 12 |
| 19 | 20 | (Denmark) Kevin Magnussen | Haas-Ferrari | 1:22.908 | N/A | N/A | 16^{h} |
| 20 | 47 | (Germany) Mick Schumacher | Haas-Ferrari | 1:23.005 | N/A | N/A | 17^{i} |
107% time: 1:26.586

Notes

- ^a – Max Verstappen received a five-place grid penalty for exceeding his quota of power unit elements.
- ^b – Carlos Sainz Jr. was required to start the race from the back of the grid for exceeding his quota of power unit elements. He also received a 10-place grid penalty for a new gearbox driveline and gearbox case. The penalty made no difference as he was already due to start from the back of the grid.
- ^c – Sergio Pérez received a 10-place grid penalty for exceeding his quota of power unit elements.
- ^d – Lewis Hamilton was required to start the race from the back of the grid for exceeding his quota of power unit elements.
- ^e – Esteban Ocon received a five-place grid penalty for exceeding his quota of power unit elements.
- ^f – Valtteri Bottas received a 15-place grid penalty for exceeding his quota of power unit elements.
- ^g – Yuki Tsunoda received a 10-place grid penalty for exceeding his quota of reprimand limits at the previous round and a three-place grid penalty for failing to slow under yellow flags during the second practice session. He was also required to start the race from the back of the grid for exceeding his quota of power unit elements. The penalty made no difference as he was already due to start from the back of the grid.
- ^h – Kevin Magnussen received a 15-place grid penalty for exceeding his quota of power unit elements.
- ^i – Mick Schumacher received a five-place grid penalty for exceeding his quota of power unit elements. He also received a 10-place grid penalty for a new gearbox driveline and gearbox case.

== Race ==
=== Race report ===
The race took place on 11 September 2022 at 15:00 local time, lasting 53 laps. Charles Leclerc led away from pole, George Russell and Daniel Ricciardo behind. Max Verstappen came to third position on lap 2 and second on lap 5. Sergio Pérez came to the pit earlier on lap 10 for hard tyres and rejoined the track with an ongoing brake fire, which later extinguished itself. On lap 10, Sebastian Vettel stopped his car due to engine issues resulting a deployment of a virtual safety car (VSC). This prompted Leclerc to change his tyres, as less time is lost when pitting under VSC conditions, surrendering the lead to Verstappen. On lap 26, Leclerc retook the lead after Verstappen changed his tyres, Verstappen rejoined the track ten seconds behind Leclerc. Alpine decided to retire Fernando Alonso car on lap 31 in the pitlane due to a water pressure issue. Leclerc made a second pitstop on lap 34, giving Verstappen the lead. Lance Stroll retired on lap 39 due to similar engine issue suffered by his teammate Sebastian Vettel on lap 10. Daniel Ricciardo stopped his car due to the oil leak suffered from his car resulting in the safety car being deployed until the end of the race. The race was ended on lap 53 with Verstappen winning the race behind safety car.

=== Safety car criticism ===
The safety car procedure following Ricciardo's retirement drew scrutiny, with discussions surrounding the decisions taken, after it turned out that marshals could not move the car expeditiously. The incident caused the race to be ended under the safety car. Charles Leclerc and Lando Norris expressed their frustration over the safety car race ending. Ferrari team principal Mattia Binotto and Red Bull Racing team principal Christian Horner gave their opinion: Binotto stated he disagreed with the FIA's decision to end the race under safety car and accused them of sleeping during the race, while Horner stated that it was not the manner he wanted to finish the race and thought that the race should have been red flagged. Mercedes team principal Toto Wolff defended the FIA's decision, stating that the FIA followed the rules while also citing the safety car procedure at the 2021 Abu Dhabi Grand Prix. The FIA later defended their decision to end the race with safety car citing the inability to move Ricciardo's car from the circuit on time. FIA has also invited the team principals for a summit to discuss the regulation changes regarding the yellow flag and safety car on 12 September with no agreement reached between parties so far.

=== Race classification ===
| Pos. | No. | Driver | Constructor | Laps | Time/Retired | Grid | Points |
|---|---|---|---|---|---|---|---|
| 1 | 1 | (Netherlands) Max Verstappen | Red Bull Racing-RBPT | 53 | 1:20:27.511 | 7 | 25 |
| 2 | 16 | (Monaco) Charles Leclerc | Ferrari | 53 | +2.446 | 1 | 18 |
| 3 | 63 | (United Kingdom) George Russell | Mercedes | 53 | +3.405 | 2 | 15 |
| 4 | 55 | (Spain) Carlos Sainz Jr. | Ferrari | 53 | +5.061 | 18 | 12 |
| 5 | 44 | (United Kingdom) Lewis Hamilton | Mercedes | 53 | +5.380 | 19 | 10 |
| 6 | 11 | (Mexico) Sergio Pérez | Red Bull Racing-RBPT | 53 | +6.091 | 13 | 9^{a} |
| 7 | 4 | (United Kingdom) Lando Norris | McLaren-Mercedes | 53 | +6.207 | 3 | 6 |
| 8 | 10 | (France) Pierre Gasly | AlphaTauri-RBPT | 53 | +6.396 | 5 | 4 |
| 9 | 45 | (Netherlands) Nyck de Vries | Williams-Mercedes | 53 | +7.122 | 8 | 2 |
| 10 | 24 | (China) Zhou Guanyu | Alfa Romeo-Ferrari | 53 | +7.910 | 9 | 1 |
| 11 | 31 | (France) Esteban Ocon | Alpine-Renault | 53 | +8.323 | 14 | |
| 12 | 47 | (Germany) Mick Schumacher | Haas-Ferrari | 53 | +8.549 | 17 | |
| 13 | 77 | (Finland) Valtteri Bottas | Alfa Romeo-Ferrari | 52 | +1 lap | 15 | |
| 14 | 22 | (Japan) Yuki Tsunoda | AlphaTauri-RBPT | 52 | +1 lap | 20 | |
| 15 | 6 | (Canada) Nicholas Latifi | Williams-Mercedes | 52 | +1 lap | 10 | |
| 16 | 20 | (Denmark) Kevin Magnussen | Haas-Ferrari | 52 | +1 lap | 16 | |
| Ret | 3 | (Australia) Daniel Ricciardo | McLaren-Mercedes | 45 | Oil leak | 4 | |
| Ret | 18 | (Canada) Lance Stroll | Aston Martin Aramco-Mercedes | 39 | Engine | 12 | |
| Ret | 14 | (Spain) Fernando Alonso | Alpine-Renault | 31 | Water pressure | 6 | |
| Ret | 5 | (Germany) Sebastian Vettel | Aston Martin Aramco-Mercedes | 10 | Engine | 11 | |
Fastest lap: (Mexico) Sergio Pérez (Red Bull Racing-RBPT) – 1:24.030 (lap 46)

Notes

- ^a – Includes one point for fastest lap.

== Championship standings after the race ==
Drivers' Championship standings

| Pos. | Driver | Points |
|---|---|---|
| 1 | (Netherlands) Max Verstappen* | 335 |
| 2 | (Monaco) Charles Leclerc* | 219 |
| 3 | (Mexico) Sergio Pérez* | 210 |
| 4 | (United Kingdom) George Russell* | 203 |
| 5 | (Spain) Carlos Sainz Jr.* | 187 |

Constructors' Championship standings

| Pos. | Constructor | Points |
|---|---|---|
| 1 | (Austria) Red Bull Racing-RBPT* | 545 |
| 2 | (Italy) Ferrari* | 406 |
| 3 | (Germany) Mercedes* | 371 |
| 4 | (France) Alpine-Renault | 125 |
| 5 | (United Kingdom) McLaren-Mercedes | 107 |

- Note: Only the top five positions are included for both sets of standings.

== See also ==
- 2022 Monza Formula 2 round
- 2022 Monza Formula 3 round

| Previous race: 2022 Dutch Grand Prix | FIA Formula One World Championship; 2022 season | Next race: 2022 Singapore Grand Prix |
| Previous race: 2021 Italian Grand Prix | Italian Grand Prix | Next race: 2023 Italian Grand Prix |
