= Dutch Grand Prix =

Formula 1 Grand Prix

- Circuit Zandvoort

Race information
- Number of times held: 38
- First held: 1950
- Last held: 2026
- Most wins (drivers): (United Kingdom) Jim Clark (4)
- Most wins (constructors): (Italy) Ferrari (8)
- Circuit length: 4.259 km (2.646 miles)
- Race length: 306.592 km (190.510 miles)
- Laps: 72

Last race (2026)

Pole position
- (United Kingdom) Lando Norris; McLaren-Mercedes; 1:11.163

Podium
- 1. (United Kingdom) L. Norris; McLaren-Mercedes; 2:04:44.859; 2. (Italy) K. Antonelli; Mercedes; +11.536; 3. (United Kingdom) G. Russell; Mercedes; +15.906

Fastest lap
- (Monaco) Charles Leclerc; Ferrari; 1:14.230

The Dutch Grand Prix (Dutch: Grote Prijs van Nederland) was an annual Formula One World Championship auto racing event, held at Circuit Zandvoort in North Holland, Netherlands, from 1950 through 1985, and after a 35 year hiatus, from 2021 to 2026.

It has been a part of the Formula One World Championship since 1952, and was designated the European Grand Prix twice, in 1962 and 1976, when this title was an honorary designation given each year to one Grand Prix race in Europe.

== History ==
=== Original circuit ===
The town of Zandvoort is located on the North Sea coast of North Holland, close to the Dutch city of Amsterdam. There were minor races on a street circuit in the town in the 1930s but during the German invasion of the Netherlands a straight road was constructed through the dunes for the Germans to hold victory parades. The road was later connected to other roads which were used to access coastal defence positions.

After the war some of these roads were widened and linked together and a racing circuit was designed, not as legend has it by John Hugenholtz, but rather by a group of officials from the Royal Dutch Motorcycle Association, with advice from Bentley Boy Sammy Davis, who had won the Le Mans 24 Hours in 1927. The first race took place in 1950. The edition, along with the 1951 event, was held as non-championship Formula One races, with Louis Rosier winning both years.

1952 was the year the Dutch Grand Prix was part of the third Formula One World Championship; this and the next year's races were won by Italian Alberto Ascari. The race was not held in 1954 due to a lack of money to hold the race, and 1955 saw yet another demonstration of Mercedes-Benz's dominance, with Argentine Juan Manuel Fangio and Briton Stirling Moss dominating the proceedings; Moss followed Fangio closely all the way. The 1956 and 1957 races were cancelled because of apparent lack of money, which was indirectly caused by the 1956–1957 Suez Crisis. The 1958 Dutch Grand Prix was won by Moss in a Vanwall. 1959 saw Swede Jo Bonnier win his only Formula One championship event and 1960 saw Dan Gurney have an accident and a spectator was killed; the race was won by Jack Brabham in a Cooper.

From 1963 to 1965 saw Briton Jim Clark win all three events, and 1967 saw the introduction of the Lotus 49 with its brand new Ford-Cosworth DFV engine. The DFV won on its debut with Clark driving; this engine became the most successful and widely used engine among private teams until 1985. The 1970 event saw the 49's successor, the 72, win comprehensively with Jochen Rindt behind the wheel. However, tragedy struck during the race: Briton Piers Courage, driving for Frank Williams, crashed heavily near the notoriously fast Tunnel Oost corner after a wheel came off and hit him on the head, which killed him. The car, with Courage still in it, then caught fire and burned to the ground. The 1971 event saw Jacky Ickx win in a Ferrari after a spirited battle with Mexican Pedro Rodriguez in a BRM in rain-soaked conditions. There was no 1972 race. It was originally on that year's calendar, but the drivers refused to race at Zandvoort, because the facilities and conditions of the circuit were out-of-date with Grand Prix racing at that time.

=== Redeveloped circuit ===
Zandvoort had been extensively modified during its absence from the Grand Prix calendar. It had been lined with Armco and the cars were protected from the sand dunes and track-side obstacles. New pits were built, and the circuit also saw a chicane placed before Bosuit, the very high-speed corner that went into the pit-straight. For the 1973 race, in an indirect celebration of the efforts put forth, there was a special atmosphere at that weekend and everyone was happy, especially the organizers. But in a cruel twist of fate, that race was to be yet another black mark on Zandvoort's history and reputation. In a race that was thought to be one of the most well organized Grands Prix yet seen, it was actually disorganization and a total lack of clear communication that would be ultimately responsible for what was to happen. On the eighth lap of the race, Briton Roger Williamson (in only his second ever Formula One race) crashed heavily near Tunnel Oost and his car caught fire while scraping along the tarmac. Williamson was uninjured during the crash; but time was running out; he could not free himself from the car. Williamson's countryman David Purley stopped alongside, crossed the track and ran over to the burning March. Purley tried in vain to turn the car upright. There appeared to have been ample time to right the car and pull Williamson out, but as desperately as he tried, Purley was unable to do it by himself, and the marshals, who were not wearing flame retardant overalls, were unable and unwilling to help due to the intense heat. Race control assumed that it was Purley's car that had crashed and that the driver had escaped unharmed. Many drivers who saw Purley waving them down to stop assumed that he was trying to put a fire out from his own car, having safely exited it, and thus did not know that a second driver had been involved. As a result, the race continued at full pace while Purley desperately tried to save the life of Williamson. Due to a group of race officials standing around Williamson's burning car doing absolutely nothing to help and even hindering the situation (by throwing away the fire extinguisher Purley was using over the Armco and down a slope), this did not work, and Williamson died not of skin burns but of asphyxiation. Purley was later awarded the George Medal for his actions. The race was won by Tyrrell driver Jackie Stewart (who broke Jim Clark's record for the most career Grand Prix victories that weekend) and his teammate François Cevert finished 2nd; but no one felt like celebrating; it was one of the darkest moments in the history of the sport.

1974 saw the re-emerging Ferrari team dominate with Austrian Niki Lauda winning; and 1975 saw Briton James Hunt win his first championship Formula One race in his Hesketh. 1976 saw Hunt win again while Lauda was recovering from his dreadful crash at the Nürburgring. 1977 was probably remembered for an incident between Hunt and American Mario Andretti. Andretti attempted ambitiously to pass Hunt at the 180-degree Tarzan corner; the two cars touched and both were out of the race. Andretti won the 1978 running; his last Formula One victory. 1979 saw a change to the circuit to slow cars coming into Tunnel Oost; there was a high-speed temporary chicane put there. Canadian Gilles Villeneuve had crashed there while battling ferociously with Australian Alan Jones and damaged his left-rear suspension. Though he carried on, at the start of the next lap he went off again at Tarzan. Refusing to give up, Villeneuve, to the shock of many, went into reverse gear and drove his Ferrari out of the muddy run-off area and back onto the circuit. About halfway around the next lap, the car's left rear rim, wheel, and suspension totally shattered and was dragged by the car as it went along, making the Ferrari nearly impossible to drive. Villeneuve, displaying his now legendary car control, made it back to the pits without crashing or going off and retired from the race; the Grand Prix was won by Jones. 1980 saw the chicane removed and replaced by a slower chicane before Tunnel Oost. 1981 saw a big battle between Frenchman Alain Prost in a Renault and Jones in a Williams; Prost came out on top to win. The 1982 event was won by Frenchman Didier Pironi in a Ferrari; his countryman René Arnoux had a dreadful crash at the end of the pit straight going into Tarzan; his front suspension failed on his ground-effect Renault and he went head on into the barriers; fortunately he was uninjured. 1983 saw a battle between championship contenders Prost and Brazilian Nelson Piquet. Prost attempted to pass Piquet at Tarzan but the Frenchman punted Piquet off and Prost crashed soon afterwards. Prost won from pole in 1984. In 1985, Lauda took his 25th and final Grand Prix victory while holding off his charging McLaren teammate Prost near the end of the race.

1985 was the race's final running, as the company that ran the circuit (CENAV) went out of business, marking the end of the old Zandvoort circuit. The track, owned by the municipality of Zandvoort, was not used for some time and part of the grounds and approximately half of the track was sold in 1987 to Vendorado, a bungalow park developer at that time. The track was eventually redesigned and remained in use for other disciplines of motorsport.

=== 2021–2026 revival ===
On 14 May 2019, the Dutch Grand Prix at the Zandvoort track was announced for the 2020 Formula One calendar.

In March 2020 the return of event was postponed in response to the COVID-19 pandemic; it was later cancelled altogether with the event's return slated for 2021, where home favourite Max Verstappen took the victory. Verstappen won the 2022 and 2023 races, with his streak of pole positions and victories at the Grand Prix since its return in 2021 being broken in 2024 with Lando Norris both taking pole and winning the race. After Piastri won the Grand Prix from pole in 2025, Norris returned to claim pole and victory the following year. George Russell also won the sprint in 2026. In 2023, the Dutch Grand Prix became the first Grand Prix to have its own music track called Lights Out by Job Smeltzer better known as La Fuente which was played after the national anthem at the 2023 race.

The Dutch Grand Prix was contracted to be held at Zandvoort until 2026, after which it was no longer part of the Formula One calendar as the local promoter decided not to seek a contract extension.

== Winners ==
=== By year ===
All Dutch Grands Prix were held at Zandvoort.

Zandvoort from 1948 to 1971

Zandvoort from 1973 to 1979

Zandvoort from 1980 to 1985

- A pink background indicates an event which was not part of the Formula One World Championship.

Year	Driver	Constructor	Report
1950	(France) Louis Rosier	Talbot-Lago	Report
1951	(France) Louis Rosier	Talbot-Lago	Report
1952	(Italy) Alberto Ascari	Ferrari	Report
1953	(Italy) Alberto Ascari	Ferrari	Report
1954	Not held due to budgetary reasons		
1955	(Argentina) Juan Manuel Fangio	Mercedes	Report
1956 – 1957	Not held due to budgetary reasons following the Suez Crisis		
1958	(United Kingdom) Stirling Moss	Vanwall	Report
1959	(Sweden) Jo Bonnier	BRM	Report
1960	(Australia) Jack Brabham	Cooper-Climax	Report
1961	(West Germany) Wolfgang von Trips	Ferrari	Report
1962	(United Kingdom) Graham Hill	BRM	Report
1963	(United Kingdom) Jim Clark	Lotus-Climax	Report
1964	(United Kingdom) Jim Clark	Lotus-Climax	Report
1965	(United Kingdom) Jim Clark	Lotus-Climax	Report
1966	(Australia) Jack Brabham	Brabham-Repco	Report
1967	(United Kingdom) Jim Clark	Lotus-Ford	Report
1968	(United Kingdom) Jackie Stewart	Matra-Ford	Report
1969	(United Kingdom) Jackie Stewart	Matra-Ford	Report
1970	(Austria) Jochen Rindt	Lotus-Ford	Report
1971	(Belgium) Jacky Ickx	Ferrari	Report
1972	Not held due to out-of-date facilities and circuit conditions		
1973	(United Kingdom) Jackie Stewart	Tyrrell-Ford	Report
1974	(Austria) Niki Lauda	Ferrari	Report
1975	(United Kingdom) James Hunt	Hesketh-Ford	Report
1976	(United Kingdom) James Hunt	McLaren-Ford	Report
1977	(Austria) Niki Lauda	Ferrari	Report
1978	(United States) Mario Andretti	Lotus-Ford	Report
1979	(Australia) Alan Jones	Williams-Ford	Report
1980	(Brazil) Nelson Piquet	Brabham-Ford	Report
1981	(France) Alain Prost	Renault	Report
1982	(France) Didier Pironi	Ferrari	Report
1983	(France) René Arnoux	Ferrari	Report
1984	(France) Alain Prost	McLaren-TAG	Report
1985	(Austria) Niki Lauda	McLaren-TAG	Report
1986 – 2019	Not held due to no race contract		
2020	Not held due to COVID-19 pandemic		
2021	(Netherlands) Max Verstappen	Red Bull Racing-Honda	Report
2022	(Netherlands) Max Verstappen	Red Bull Racing-RBPT	Report
2023	(Netherlands) Max Verstappen	Red Bull Racing-Honda RBPT	Report
2024	(United Kingdom) Lando Norris	McLaren-Mercedes	Report
2025	(Australia) Oscar Piastri	McLaren-Mercedes	Report
2026	(United Kingdom) Lando Norris	McLaren-Mercedes	Report

=== Repeat winners (drivers) ===
A pink background indicates an event which was not part of the Formula One World Championship.

Drivers in bold are competing in the Formula One championship in 2026.

Wins	Driver	Years won
4	(United Kingdom) Jim Clark	1963, 1964, 1965, 1967
3	(United Kingdom) Jackie Stewart	1968, 1969, 1973
3	(Austria) Niki Lauda	1974, 1977, 1985
3	(Netherlands) **Max Verstappen**	2021, 2022, 2023
2	(France) Louis Rosier	1950, 1951
2	(Italy) Alberto Ascari	1952, 1953
2	(Australia) Jack Brabham	1960, 1966
2	(United Kingdom) James Hunt	1975, 1976
2	(France) Alain Prost	1981, 1984
2	(United Kingdom) **Lando Norris**	2024, 2026

=== Repeat winners (constructors) ===
A pink background indicates an event which was not part of the Formula One World Championship.

Teams in bold are competing in the Formula One championship in 2026.

Wins	Constructor	Years won
8	(Italy) **Ferrari**	1952, 1953, 1961, 1971, 1974, 1977, 1982, 1983
6	(United Kingdom) Lotus	1963, 1964, 1965, 1967, 1970, 1978
6	(United Kingdom) **McLaren**	1976, 1984, 1985, 2024, 2025, 2026
3	(Austria) **Red Bull**	2021, 2022, 2023
2	(France) Talbot-Lago	1950, 1951
2	(United Kingdom) BRM	1959, 1962
2	(France) Matra	1968, 1969
2	(United Kingdom) Brabham	1966, 1980

=== Repeat winners (engine manufacturers) ===
A pink background indicates an event which was not part of the Formula One World Championship.

Manufacturers in bold are competing in the Formula One championship in 2026.

Wins	Manufacturer	Years won
10	(United States) Ford *	1967, 1968, 1969, 1970, 1973, 1975, 1976, 1978, 1979, 1980
8	(Italy) **Ferrari**	1952, 1953, 1961, 1971, 1974, 1977, 1982, 1983
4	(United Kingdom) Climax	1960, 1963, 1964, 1965
4	(Germany) **Mercedes**	1955, 2024, 2025, 2026
2	(France) Talbot-Lago	1950, 1951
2	(United Kingdom) BRM	1959, 1962
2	(Luxembourg) TAG **	1984, 1985

* Designed and built by Cosworth, funded by Ford

** Built by Porsche
