= 2023 Hungarian Grand Prix =

Formula One motor race

Race 11 of 22 in the 2023 Formula One World Championship
← Previous race	Next race →
- Layout of the Hungaroring

Race details
- Date: 23 July 2023
- Official name: Formula 1 Qatar Airways Hungarian Grand Prix 2023
- Location: Hungaroring; Mogyoród, Hungary
- Course: Permanent racing facility
- Course length: 4.381 km (2.722 miles)
- Distance: 70 laps, 306.630 km (190.531 miles)
- Weather: Sunny
- Attendance: 303,000

Pole position
Driver	(United Kingdom) Lewis Hamilton	Mercedes
- Time: 1:16.609

Fastest lap
Driver	(Netherlands) Max Verstappen	Red Bull Racing-Honda RBPT
- Time: 1:20.504 on lap 53

Podium
First	(Netherlands) Max Verstappen	Red Bull Racing-Honda RBPT
Second	(United Kingdom) Lando Norris	McLaren-Mercedes
Third	(Mexico) Sergio Pérez	Red Bull Racing-Honda RBPT

The 2023 Hungarian Grand Prix (officially known as the Formula 1 Qatar Airways Hungarian Grand Prix 2023) was a Formula One motor race that was held on 23 July 2023 at the Hungaroring circuit in Mogyoród, Hungary. It was the eleventh round of the 2023 Formula One World Championship.

The race saw the first pole position for Lewis Hamilton since the 2021 Saudi Arabian Grand Prix. Max Verstappen won the race, allowing Red Bull Racing to break the record for most consecutive wins for a constructor, with 12. The race also marked the return of Daniel Ricciardo as a full time driver, replacing Nyck de Vries at AlphaTauri.

== Background ==
The event was held across the weekend of 21–23 July. It was the eleventh round of the 2023 Formula One World Championship and the 39th running of the Hungarian Grand Prix.

=== Championship standings before the race ===
Coming into the weekend, Max Verstappen led the Drivers' Championship by 99 points from teammate Sergio Pérez, with Fernando Alonso third, a further 19 points behind. Red Bull Racing led the Constructors' Championship, leading Mercedes by 208 points and Aston Martin by a further 22 points.

=== Entrants ===
The drivers and teams were the same as the season entry list with the exception of Daniel Ricciardo, who replaced Nyck de Vries at AlphaTauri starting from this Grand Prix.

=== Tyre choices ===
Tyre supplier Pirelli brought the C3, C4 and C5 tyre compounds (designated hard, medium, and soft, respectively) for teams to use at the event.

A reduction in allocated tyre sets from the standard 13 to 11 was trialled during this Grand Prix, with the intention of making tyre usage more sustainable. The usage of tyre compounds during qualifying was mandated as hard in Q1, medium in Q2 and soft in Q3, assuming that the weather is dry.

== Practice ==
Three free practice sessions were held for the event, consisted of two one-hour sessions on 21 July, at 13:30 and 18:00 local time (UTC+2), and a one-hour practice session on 22 July at 13:30. The first practice session was red-flagged twice after Sergio Pérez and Carlos Sainz Jr. crashed in changing conditions; Pérez's crash inflicted heavy damage to his Red Bull Racing RB19, and Sainz was able to recover to the road as the red flag was waved. The first session ended with George Russell fastest ahead of Oscar Piastri and Lance Stroll. Charles Leclerc was fastest in the second practice session, with Lando Norris and Pierre Gasly finishing second and third, respectively. The third session ended with Lewis Hamilton fastest, with Max Verstappen and Sergio Pérez finishing second and third, respectively.

== Qualifying ==
Qualifying was held on 22 July 2023, at 16:00 local time (UTC+2).

=== Qualifying report ===
Hards were used for the first segment, Q1, where Zhou Guanyu was fastest in his Alfa Romeo in front of Max Verstappen and Sergio Pérez. A brief scuffle with traffic towards the end of the first session was detrimental to George Russell, who alongside Kevin Magnussen, Logan Sargeant, Yuki Tsunoda and Alexander Albon were all knocked out. Meanwhile, Valtteri Bottas and Lance Stroll were investigated for impeding. No action was taken.

Mediums were used for the second segment, Q2. Lando Norris led the session early on with Oscar Piastri behind him. Verstappen initially topped the timesheets but his lap was deleted due to track limits. Nico Hülkenberg was sixth as Bottas returned to fourth. Tenth-placed Fernando Alonso snuck into the final segment (Q3) by a gap of 0.002 seconds, knocking out Carlos Sainz Jr. Sainz was joined by Daniel Ricciardo, Esteban Ocon, Stroll and Pierre Gasly as part of the group all eliminated.

Softs were used for the third and final segment, Q3. This was Pérez's first time in Q3 since the Miami Grand Prix two months ago; he would qualify ninth, ahead of Hülkenberg. Verstappen put his car on provisional pole until Hamilton pushed through to make his first pole position since the 2021 Saudi Arabian Grand Prix – and breaking a streak of consecutive Verstappen poles dating back to the Miami Grand Prix. Zhou put up the highest qualifying performance of his career in fifth, with his teammate Bottas in seventh behind Charles Leclerc. Norris and Piastri continued to show the McLaren MCL60's newfound pace by qualifying third and fourth. Alonso was in eighth.

=== Qualifying classification ===
Pos.	No.	Driver	Constructor	Qualifying times			Final grid
Pos.	No.	Driver	Constructor	Q1	Q2	Q3	Final grid
1	44	(United Kingdom) Lewis Hamilton	Mercedes	1:18.577	1:17.427	1:16.609	1
2	1	(Netherlands) Max Verstappen	Red Bull Racing-Honda RBPT	1:18.318	1:17.547	1:16.612	2
3	4	(United Kingdom) Lando Norris	McLaren-Mercedes	1:18.697	1:17.328	1:16.694	3
4	81	(Australia) Oscar Piastri	McLaren-Mercedes	1:18.464	1:17.571	1:16.905	4
5	24	(China) Zhou Guanyu	Alfa Romeo-Ferrari	1:18.143	1:17.700	1:16.971	5
6	16	(Monaco) Charles Leclerc	Ferrari	1:18.440	1:17.580	1:16.992	6
7	77	(Finland) Valtteri Bottas	Alfa Romeo-Ferrari	1:18.775	1:17.563	1:17.034	7
8	14	(Spain) Fernando Alonso	Aston Martin Aramco-Mercedes	1:18.580	1:17.701	1:17.035	8
9	11	(Mexico) Sergio Pérez	Red Bull Racing-Honda RBPT	1:18.360	1:17.675	1:17.045	9
10	27	(Germany) Nico Hülkenberg	Haas-Ferrari	1:18.695	1:17.652	1:17.186	10
11	55	(Spain) Carlos Sainz Jr.	Ferrari	1:18.393	1:17.703	N/A	11
12	31	(France) Esteban Ocon	Alpine-Renault	1:18.854	1:17.841	N/A	12
13	3	(Australia) Daniel Ricciardo	AlphaTauri-Honda RBPT	1:18.906	1:18.002	N/A	13
14	18	(Canada) Lance Stroll	Aston Martin Aramco-Mercedes	1:18.782	1:18.144	N/A	14
15	10	(France) Pierre Gasly	Alpine-Renault	1:18.743	1:18.217	N/A	15
16	23	(Thailand) Alexander Albon	Williams-Mercedes	1:18.917	N/A	N/A	16
17	22	(Japan) Yuki Tsunoda	AlphaTauri-Honda RBPT	1:18.919	N/A	N/A	17
18	63	(United Kingdom) George Russell	Mercedes	1:19.027	N/A	N/A	18
19	20	(Denmark) Kevin Magnussen	Haas-Ferrari	1:19.206	N/A	N/A	19
20	2	(United States) Logan Sargeant	Williams-Mercedes	1:19.248	N/A	N/A	20
107% time: 1:23.613

== Race ==
The race was held on 23 July 2023, at 15:00 local time (UTC+2).

=== Race report ===
At the start, Max Verstappen overtook polesitter Lewis Hamilton into turn 1 and led the rest of the 70-lap race comfortably, initially with Oscar Piastri behind him. Also in turn 1, Zhou Guanyu, after a poor start, rear-ended Daniel Ricciardo, who was pushed into the back of Ocon. This pushed Ocon into Gasly, with the latter two retiring. This meant Ricciardo was momentarily in last place.

Tyre changes shook up the order, with Pérez ending up second behind Verstappen, who was leading comfortably; Verstappen would come into the pits himself and retain his lead. Charles Leclerc was under attack by Lance Stroll and Carlos Sainz Jr., but Stroll fell behind as Fernando Alonso moved past him. Pérez stopping meant that Lando Norris was second, and Pérez soon overtook Norris' teammate Piastri for fourth with a small push for Piastri into the grass, which stewards did not investigate. Soon, Hamilton took Piastri's spot but could not catch Pérez. Leclerc sped in the pit lane, at a speed of 80.7 km/h (50.1 mph) compared to a limit of 80 km/h (50 mph), and received a five-second penalty.

By the end of the race, Verstappen pulled out a 33-second gap – Verstappen's highest of the season – as Norris continued to defend against Pérez. Logan Sargeant had a spin, resulting in his retirement. Red Bull won the race, breaking the record for most consecutive wins by a constructor, with 12, McLaren had previously held the record since 1988, with 11 consecutive wins. McLaren's Norris took second place with Piastri in fifth. Alonso and Stroll were ninth and tenth, respectively. Second place for Norris marked the first time in his Formula One career that he had claimed back to back podiums and the first time McLaren had achieved consecutive podiums since they achieved back to back wins with Lewis Hamilton and Jenson Button at the 2012 United States Grand Prix and 2012 Brazilian Grand Prix, respectively.

==== Post race ====
On the podium, Norris accidentally broke Verstappen's trophy – a hand-made Herend vase valued at about $45,000 – during the celebrations. Norris initially poked fun at the incident, "blaming" Verstappen for it, although he subsequently apologised to Verstappen and his team. Herend produced a replacement trophy at no cost, which was presented to Verstappen in late August with Norris in attendance holding a fake invoice for the trophy.

=== Race classification ===
Pos.	No.	Driver	Constructor	Laps	Time/Retired	Grid	Points
1	1	(Netherlands) Max Verstappen	Red Bull Racing-Honda RBPT	70	1:38:08.634	2	26^{a}
2	4	(United Kingdom) Lando Norris	McLaren-Mercedes	70	+33.731	3	18
3	11	(Mexico) Sergio Pérez	Red Bull Racing-Honda RBPT	70	+37.603	9	15
4	44	(United Kingdom) Lewis Hamilton	Mercedes	70	+39.134	1	12
5	81	(Australia) Oscar Piastri	McLaren-Mercedes	70	+1:02.572	4	10
6	63	(United Kingdom) George Russell	Mercedes	70	+1:05.825	18	8
7	16	(Monaco) Charles Leclerc	Ferrari	70	+1:10.317^{b}	6	6
8	55	(Spain) Carlos Sainz Jr.	Ferrari	70	+1:11.073	11	4
9	14	(Spain) Fernando Alonso	Aston Martin Aramco-Mercedes	70	+1:15.709	8	2
10	18	(Canada) Lance Stroll	Aston Martin Aramco-Mercedes	69	+1 lap	14	1
11	23	(Thailand) Alexander Albon	Williams-Mercedes	69	+1 lap	16	
12	77	(Finland) Valtteri Bottas	Alfa Romeo-Ferrari	69	+1 lap	7	
13	3	(Australia) Daniel Ricciardo	AlphaTauri-Honda RBPT	69	+1 lap	13	
14	27	(Germany) Nico Hülkenberg	Haas-Ferrari	69	+1 lap	10	
15	22	(Japan) Yuki Tsunoda	AlphaTauri-Honda RBPT	69	+1 lap	17	
16	24	(China) Zhou Guanyu	Alfa Romeo-Ferrari	69	+1 lap	5	
17	20	(Denmark) Kevin Magnussen	Haas-Ferrari	69	+1 lap	19	
18^{c}	2	(United States) Logan Sargeant	Williams-Mercedes	67	Puncture damage	20	
Ret	31	(France) Esteban Ocon	Alpine-Renault	2	Collision	12	
Ret	10	(France) Pierre Gasly	Alpine-Renault	1	Collision	15	
Fastest lap: (Netherlands) Max Verstappen (Red Bull Racing-Honda RBPT) – 1:20.504 (lap 53)

Notes

- ^a – Includes one point for fastest lap.
- ^b – Charles Leclerc finished sixth, but he received a five-second time penalty for speeding in the pit lane.
- ^c – Logan Sargeant was classified as he completed more than 90% of the race distance.

== Championship standings after the race ==
Drivers' Championship standings

	Pos.	Driver	Points
	1	(Netherlands) Max Verstappen	281
	2	(Mexico) Sergio Pérez	171
	3	(Spain) Fernando Alonso	139
	4	(United Kingdom) Lewis Hamilton	133
1	5	(United Kingdom) George Russell	90

Constructors' Championship standings

Pos.	Constructor	Points
1	(Austria) Red Bull Racing-Honda RBPT	452
2	(Germany) Mercedes	223
3	(United Kingdom) Aston Martin Aramco-Mercedes	184
4	(Italy) Ferrari	167
5	(United Kingdom) McLaren-Mercedes	87

- Note: Only the top five positions are included for both sets of standings.

== See also ==
- 2023 Budapest Formula 2 round
- 2023 Budapest Formula 3 round

Previous race: 2023 British Grand Prix	FIA Formula One World Championship; 2023 season	Next race: 2023 Belgian Grand Prix
Previous race: 2022 Hungarian Grand Prix	Hungarian Grand Prix	Next race: 2024 Hungarian Grand Prix
