= Overtake Award =

Formula 1 Award

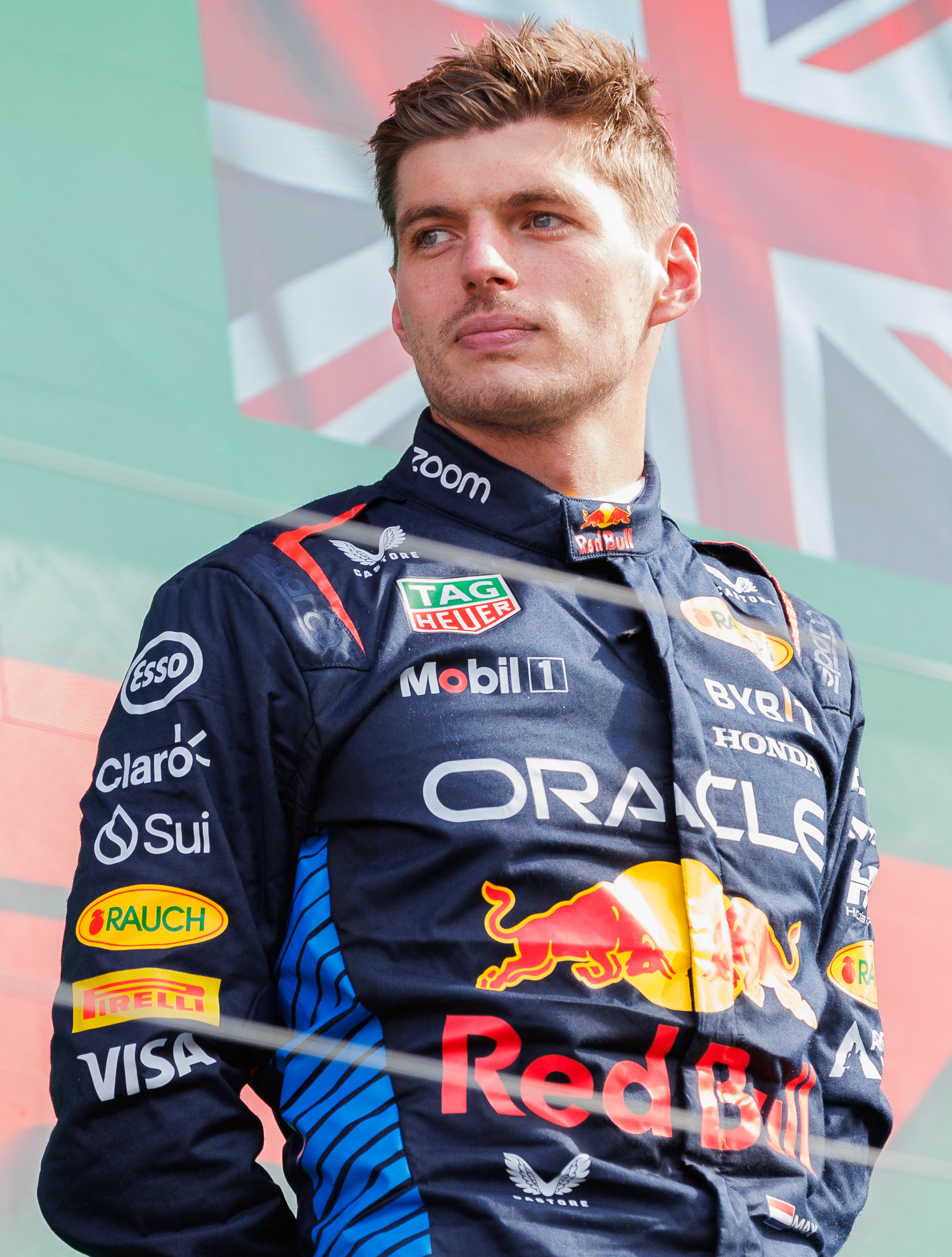
- Max Verstappen, the current titleholder
- Awarded for: Best Overtake of the Month/Year (2023–present); Best Overtake of the Race (2022); Most Race Overtakes (2021)
- Presented by: Crypto.com
- Reward: Trophy
- First award: 2021
- Currently held by: Max Verstappen
- Website: Official website

The Overtake Award is presented annually by cryptocurrency platform and Formula One global sponsor Crypto.com. Though initially given for the most overtakes achieved over the season in 2021, it has evolved into a monthly poll, with a final vote to determine the "best overtake of the year".

== History and rules ==
=== History ===
The award was first given in 2021 by Crypto.com, the trophy's official sponsor, to the individual driver who made the most overtakes during the season. This was in an effort to "celebrate the bravery exhibited by drivers who make bold moves in pursuit of success", and "to celebrate drivers' instincts to make bold and strategic moves". The award was modified for the 2022 season: instead of counting the number of overtakes, fans voted for the best overtake of each Grand Prix via social media. At the end of the season there was a social media poll to determine the overall winner. For the 2023 and 2024 seasons, the award was modified so that fans may select their favourite overtake from a shortlist of the best on-track action every month of the season. At the end of the season, all winners are voted to decide the definitive on-track move of the season.

=== Rules ===
According to the award rules, an overtake occurs when two racers on the same lap traverse a timing loop on a race track in a different order than when they passed through the previous one. The pass must happen on the track rather than in the pit lane. The pit lane section's length is determined by the safety car's entry and exit lines. First lap overtakes are counted and the driver's starting position serves as the race's first timing loop. A pass that the stewards deemed illegal and resulted in a sporting penalty for that racer is still counted. If a driver is disqualified from a Grand Prix, any passes they made are counted. No overtakes are recognised if the pursued driver retires or is slower than usual owing to an error when not in a duel, or if they are affected by a mechanical problem. Any position changes that occur behind the safety car or during a race stoppage are likewise not counted.

== Overtake Award 2021 ==
Sebastian Vettel holding the Overtake Award Trophy in 2021

In the inaugural Crypto.com Overtake Award, Sebastian Vettel won the award for making the most overtakes of any driver during the 2021 season. The eight drivers who performed the most overtakes throughout the season were:

Rank	Driver	Overtakes
1	(Germany) Sebastian Vettel	132
2	(Spain) Fernando Alonso	128
3	(Finland) Kimi Räikkönen	127
4	(Canada) Lance Stroll	118
5	(Spain) Carlos Sainz Jr.	116
6	(Mexico) Sergio Pérez	115
7	(Australia) Daniel Ricciardo	112
8	(Japan) Yuki Tsunoda	110

== Overtake King 2022 ==
In 2022, the award was awarded after every race. At the end of the season, Sebastian Vettel's overtake against Kevin Magnussen in the United States Grand Prix was voted as the favourite on-track move of the season, meaning that Vettel won the award for the second year in a row.

Overall winner

Race	Driver	Against
Bahrain Grand Prix	(Monaco) Charles Leclerc	(Netherlands) Max Verstappen
(Saudi Arabia) Saudi Arabian Grand Prix	(Denmark) Kevin Magnussen	(France) Pierre Gasly
(Australia) Australian Grand Prix	(Mexico) Sergio Pérez	(United Kingdom) Lewis Hamilton
(Italy) Emilia Romagna Grand Prix	(Netherlands) Max Verstappen	(Monaco) Charles Leclerc
(United States) Miami Grand Prix	(Spain) Fernando Alonso	(United Kingdom) Lewis Hamilton
(Spain) Spanish Grand Prix	(United Kingdom) Lewis Hamilton	(Spain) Carlos Sainz Jr.
Monaco Grand Prix	(France) Pierre Gasly	(Australia) Daniel Ricciardo
Azerbaijan Grand Prix	(Germany) Sebastian Vettel	(Japan) Yuki Tsunoda
(Canada) Canadian Grand Prix	(Monaco) Charles Leclerc	(Finland) Valtteri Bottas
(United Kingdom) British Grand Prix	(United Kingdom) Lewis Hamilton	(Mexico) Sergio Pérez (Monaco) Charles Leclerc
(Austria) Austrian Grand Prix	(Monaco) Charles Leclerc	(Netherlands) Max Verstappen
(France) French Grand Prix	(Spain) Fernando Alonso	(United Kingdom) Lando Norris (United Kingdom) George Russell
(Hungary) Hungarian Grand Prix	(Australia) Daniel Ricciardo	(France) Esteban Ocon (Spain) Fernando Alonso
(Belgium) Belgian Grand Prix	(France) Esteban Ocon	(France) Pierre Gasly (Germany) Sebastian Vettel
(Netherlands) Dutch Grand Prix	(Germany) Mick Schumacher	(Germany) Sebastian Vettel
(Italy) Italian Grand Prix	(United Kingdom) Lewis Hamilton	(France) Pierre Gasly (United Kingdom) Lando Norris
Singapore Grand Prix	(Germany) Sebastian Vettel	(Canada) Lance Stroll (Denmark) Kevin Magnussen (Japan) Yuki Tsunoda
(Japan) Japanese Grand Prix	(Canada) Lance Stroll	Different drivers
United States Grand Prix	(Germany) Sebastian Vettel	(Denmark) Kevin Magnussen
Mexico City Grand Prix	(Canada) Lance Stroll	Different drivers
(Brazil) São Paulo Grand Prix	(United Kingdom) George Russell	(Netherlands) Max Verstappen
(United Arab Emirates) Abu Dhabi Grand Prix	(China) Zhou Guanyu	(Thailand) Alexander Albon

== Overtake of the Month 2023 ==
In 2023, the fans selected from a shortlist of the best on-track action every month of the season. At the end of the season, all monthly winners went up against each other. Charles Leclerc's overtake against Sergio Pérez in the Las Vegas Grand Prix was awarded as the Overtake of the Year.

Overtake of the Year

Month	Race	Driver	Against
March	Bahrain Grand Prix	(Spain) Fernando Alonso	(United Kingdom) Lewis Hamilton
April	Azerbaijan Grand Prix	(Spain) Fernando Alonso	(Spain) Carlos Sainz Jr.
May	Monaco Grand Prix	(Denmark) Kevin Magnussen	(United States) Logan Sargeant
June	(Canada) Canadian Grand Prix	(Spain) Fernando Alonso	(United Kingdom) Lewis Hamilton
July	(Hungary) Hungarian Grand Prix	(Mexico) Sergio Pérez	(Australia) Oscar Piastri
August (Note: Despite being held in August, the 2023 Dutch Grand Prix was included as part of the September award.)	(Japan) Japanese Grand Prix	(Monaco) Charles Leclerc	(United Kingdom) George Russell
September	(Japan) Japanese Grand Prix	(Monaco) Charles Leclerc	(United Kingdom) George Russell
October	Mexico City Grand Prix	(United Kingdom) Lando Norris	(United Kingdom) George Russell
November	(United States) Las Vegas Grand Prix	(Monaco) Charles Leclerc	(Mexico) Sergio Pérez

== Overtake of the Month 2024 ==
Similar to the 2023 season, in the 2024 season, the fans vote from a shortlist of the best on-track action every month. The winning driver is presented with the award at the following Formula One event in the fan forum. Franco Colapinto's overtake against Fernando Alonso in the United States Grand Prix was voted as the Overtake of the Year.

Overtake of the Year

Month	Race	Driver	Against
March	(Saudi Arabia) Saudi Arabian Grand Prix	(United Kingdom) Oliver Bearman	(Japan) Yuki Tsunoda
April	(Japan) Japanese Grand Prix	(Japan) Yuki Tsunoda	(Germany) Nico Hülkenberg
May	(United States) Miami Grand Prix	(Monaco) Charles Leclerc	(United Kingdom) Lewis Hamilton
June	(Canada) Canadian Grand Prix	(Thailand) Alexander Albon	(Australia) Daniel Ricciardo (France) Esteban Ocon
July	(Belgium) Belgian Grand Prix	(Australia) Oscar Piastri	(Monaco) Charles Leclerc
August (Note: Despite being held in August, the 2024 Dutch Grand Prix was included as part of the September award.)	Azerbaijan Grand Prix	(Australia) Oscar Piastri	(Monaco) Charles Leclerc
September	Azerbaijan Grand Prix	(Australia) Oscar Piastri	(Monaco) Charles Leclerc
October	United States Grand Prix	(Argentina) Franco Colapinto	(Spain) Fernando Alonso
November	(United States) Las Vegas Grand Prix	(Monaco) Charles Leclerc	(France) Pierre Gasly (Spain) Carlos Sainz Jr.
December	(United Arab Emirates) Abu Dhabi Grand Prix	(Monaco) Charles Leclerc	(New Zealand) Liam Lawson (Finland) Valtteri Bottas (Mexico) Sergio Pérez

== Overtake of the Month 2025 ==
Similar to the 2023 and 2024 seasons, in the 2025 season, the fans vote from a shortlist of the best on-track action every month. The winning driver is presented with the award at the following Formula One event in the fan forum.

Overtake of the Year

Month	Race	Driver	Against
March	(Australia) Australian Grand Prix	(Australia) Oscar Piastri	(United Kingdom) Lewis Hamilton
April	(Saudi Arabia) Saudi Arabian Grand Prix	(Australia) Oscar Piastri	(United Kingdom) Lewis Hamilton
May	(Italy) Emilia Romagna Grand Prix	(Netherlands) Max Verstappen	(Australia) Oscar Piastri
June	(Austria) Austrian Grand Prix	(United Kingdom) Lewis Hamilton	(New Zealand) Liam Lawson
July (Note: Despite being held in August, the 2025 Hungarian Grand Prix was included as part of the July award.)	(United Kingdom) British Grand Prix	(United Kingdom) Lewis Hamilton	(United Kingdom) George Russell (France) Esteban Ocon
August	(United Kingdom) British Grand Prix	(United Kingdom) Lewis Hamilton	(United Kingdom) George Russell (France) Esteban Ocon
August	(Netherlands) Dutch Grand Prix	(Monaco) Charles Leclerc	(United Kingdom) George Russell
September (Note: Despite being held in August, the 2025 Dutch Grand Prix was included as part of the September award.)	(Netherlands) Dutch Grand Prix	(Monaco) Charles Leclerc	(United Kingdom) George Russell
October	Mexico City Grand Prix	(United Kingdom) Oliver Bearman	(Netherlands) Max Verstappen
November (Note: Despite being held in December, the 2025 Abu Dhabi Grand Prix was included as part of the November award.)	(United Arab Emirates) Abu Dhabi Grand Prix	(Australia) Oscar Piastri	(United Kingdom) Lando Norris

== Overtake of the Month 2026 ==
As since 2023, the fans vote from a shortlist of the best on-track action every month. The winning driver is presented with the award at the following Formula One event in the fan forum.

Overtake of the Year

Month	Race	Driver	Against
March	(Japan) Japanese Grand Prix	(Monaco) Charles Leclerc	(United Kingdom) George Russell
May	(Canada) Canadian Grand Prix	(Australia) Oscar Piastri	(United Kingdom) Lewis Hamilton
June	(Austria) Austrian Grand Prix	(Netherlands) Max Verstappen	(United Kingdom) Lewis Hamilton
July	(Hungary) Hungarian Grand Prix	(Netherlands) Max Verstappen	(United Kingdom) Lewis Hamilton
September (Note: Despite being held in August, the 2026 Dutch Grand Prix was included as part of the September award.)	(Netherlands) Dutch Grand Prix	(Japan) Yuki Tsunoda	(France) Pierre Gasly
October	Bahrain Grand Prix in Malaysia	(Netherlands) Max Verstappen	(Italy) Kimi Antonelli
