= Yuki Tsunoda =

Japanese racing driver (born 2000)

- 角田 裕毅
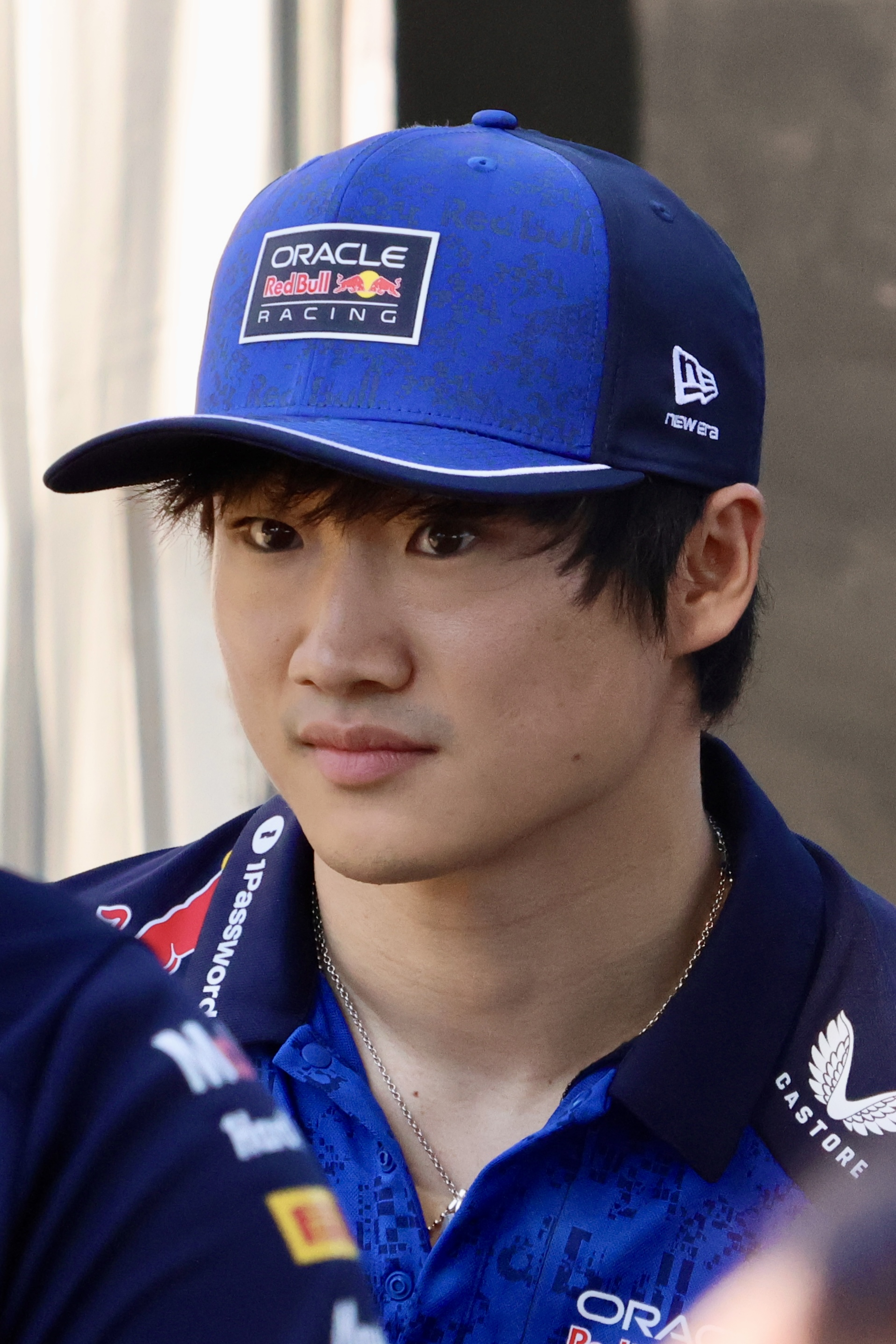
- Tsunoda at the 2026 Australian Grand Prix
- Born: 11 May 2000 (age 26); Sagamihara, Kanagawa, Japan

Formula One World Championship career
- Nationality: (Japan) Japanese
- 2026 team: Racing Bulls-Red Bull Ford
- Car number: 22
- Entries: 117 (114 starts)
- Championships: 0
- Wins: 0
- Podiums: 0
- Career points: 125
- Pole positions: 0
- Fastest laps: 1
- First entry: 2021 Bahrain Grand Prix
- Last entry: 2026 Spanish Grand Prix
- 2025 position: 17th (33 pts)

Previous series
- 2020; 2020; 2019; 2019; 2016–2018; 2017; 2016: FIA Formula 2; Toyota Racing Series; FIA Formula 3; Euroformula Open; F4 Japanese; JAF Japan F4; Super FJ

Championship titles
- 2018; 2017; 2016: F4 Japanese; JAF Japan F4 – East; Super FJ All-Japan

Awards
- 2020; 2020: FIA Rookie of the Year; Anthoine Hubert Award
- Website: www.yukitsunoda.com

Yuki Tsunoda (Japanese: 角田 裕毅, Hepburn: Tsunoda Yūki; pronounced [tsɯnoda jɯ̟ᵝːkʲi]; born 11 May 2000) is a Japanese racing driver who serves as a reserve driver in Formula One for Red Bull Racing and Racing Bulls. Tsunoda competed in Formula One full-time from 2021 to 2025, and served as a reserve driver in 2026.

Born in Sagamihara and raised in Tokyo, Tsunoda began competitive kart racing aged nine. Supported by Honda since 2016 through the Honda Formula Dream Project, Tsunoda graduated to junior formulae the same year. He won his first full championship at the JAF Japan F4 East Series in 2017, winning the F4 Japanese Championship the next season. In 2019, he progressed to FIA Formula 3 with Jenzer and became a member of the Red Bull Junior Team, before finishing third in his rookie season of FIA Formula 2 in 2020 with Carlin.

Tsunoda debuted in Formula One for AlphaTauri in 2021, using a Honda powertrain alongside Pierre Gasly; he finished a career-best fourth at the Abu Dhabi Grand Prix that year. Tsunoda retained his seat at AlphaTauri in 2022 and 2023, partnering Nyck de Vries and Daniel Ricciardo in the latter. He remained at the team for the 2024 season as they re-branded to Racing Bulls, before his promotion to senior team Red Bull for the Japanese Grand Prix onwards in 2025. Replaced by Isack Hadjar for 2026, Tsunoda became the reserve driver for both teams and returned at the Dutch Grand Prix for Racing Bulls.

== Early and personal life ==
Tsunoda was born on 11 May 2000, in Sagamihara, Kanagawa. He attended LCA International Elementary School and Nihon University Third High School before transferring to Wako High School in April 2017. Tsunoda started his studies at the Faculty of Sport Management of Nippon Sport Science University in April 2019 but later took a leave of absence and eventually withdrew to concentrate on his racing career.

Tsunoda cooks food as a hobby and has expressed a desire to open a restaurant.

== Junior racing career ==
=== Karting (2010–2016) ===
Tsunoda started his professional karting career in 2010, joining the JAF Junior Karting Championship, before moving to the regional class in 2013 and to the national class in 2014.

=== Formula 4 (2016–2018) ===
In 2016, Tsunoda graduated from Honda's Suzuka Circuit Racing School in the advanced formula class and became a member of the Honda Formula Dream Project. In the same year, he made his single-seater debut in the F4 Japanese Championship with the Sutekina Racing Team for a one-off event in Suzuka. He claimed his first podium with second in the first race and finished fourth in the second race. In 2017, Tsunoda started his first full season of single-seater racing in the F4 Japanese Championship while also contesting in the regional East series of the JAF F4 Japanese Championship. At Okayama, he would win his first race. Tsunoda won the title of the regional championship while finishing third in the national Formula 4 championship. He contested both championships with Honda. Tsunoda continued to race in Japanese F4 in 2018 with the Honda Formula Dream Project team. Tsunoda amassed seven wins and claimed the title during the final race at Motegi, beating rival Teppei Natori by fourteen points.

=== Formula Three (2019–2020) ===
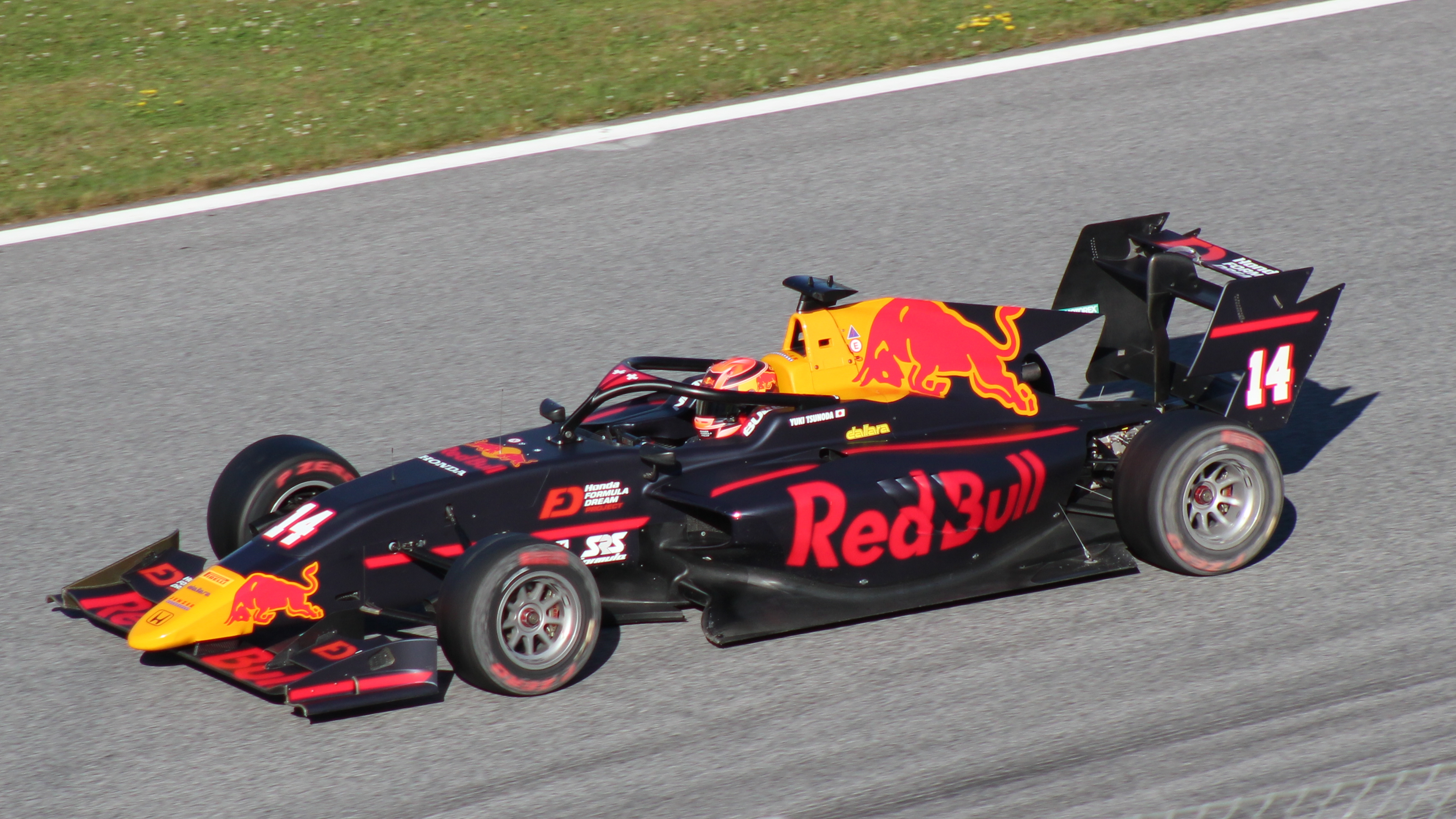
Tsunoda racing at the 2019 Spielberg Formula 3 round

With Honda tying up with Red Bull in Formula One, Tsunoda also joined the Red Bull junior team alongside the Honda programme. At the end of 2018, Tsunoda was announced to join Jenzer Motorsport in the newly announced FIA Formula 3 Championship. He scored tenth place and his first point during the first race in Barcelona, and ninth in Race 2. More points came in Paul Ricard where he came away seventh in Race 1, but struggled to ninth in Race 2 from second. Tsunoda failed to score points in Austria, but came back during Race 2 in Silverstone with seventh. He scored points in Budapest, with ninth and sixth place. In Spa-Francorchamps, he qualified in an astonishing third place. The Japanese racer dropped to sixth in Race 1, but from third in Race 2, scored a breakthrough second place. Monza was fruitful for Tsunoda, finishing fourth on the road but was promoted to the podium following a penalty for Marcus Armstrong. In Race 2, a storming start from sixth moved him to third at the start. After passing Fabio Scherer, he would go by Jake Hughes on lap 15 and claim his only F3 win of the year. He finished ninth in the championship with 67 points, including three podiums and a win, scoring all of the Jenzer team's points during the season. Tsunoda finished 11th at the non-championship Macau Grand Prix.

Tsunoda also competed for Motopark in the Euroformula Open Championship, following the cancellation of Formula European Masters. After a second-place finish in the first race at Paul Ricard and achieving third place in the Pau Grand Prix, Tsunoda claimed his maiden championship win in the second race at Hockenheim. In Spa-Francorchamps, Tsunoda was involved in a collision with teammate Liam Lawson during the second race, having scored second place in Race 1. He took a double podium during the Monza final round. Despite missing two rounds due to F3 commitments, Tsunoda placed fourth in the standings with 151 points, one win and five more podiums. Before the start of his 2020 season, Tsunoda partook in the 2020 Toyota Racing Series with M2 Competition alongside Liam Lawson. Tsunoda scored one win throughout the campaign, during the second race at the opening round in Highlands Motorsport Park. He claimed two further podium finishes later in the season, landing him fourth place in the championship.

=== FIA Formula 2 (2020) ===
In the beginning of 2020, Honda announced that Tsunoda would join Carlin to race in the FIA Formula 2 Championship alongside new Red Bull junior Jehan Daruvala. The season was scheduled start in Bahrain, but started in Austria in July due to the COVID-19 pandemic. He topped free practice on his debut, but only qualified 12th. His races were disappointing, colliding with Daruvala on the opening lap of the feature race saw him finish last, but recovered to 11th on Sunday. During the second Austrian round, Tsunoda stormed to his first pole. He would lead the race for much of the race under wet conditions, but encountered a radio problem that delayed his pit stop. He would pit two laps later than expected and drop to fourth place, but fought past the Virtuosi drivers for second place. More disappointment followed as an engine issue saw him drop out of the race on lap 10. Another disappointing round in Hungary rewarded him with zero points, with a 16th and 18th place.

Tsunoda qualified ninth in Silverstone, and made a masterclass charge, passing Christian Lundgaard on the last lap for third place. Another sprint race disappointment followed, as he was taken out by Callum Ilott on the opening lap. During the second Silverstone round, Tsunoda qualified tenth and moved up to sixth for the feature race. In the sprint race, he remained in third for most of the race, until lap 19 of 21, where the two Prema drivers ahead collided and promoted Tsunoda for his maiden win. Post-race, Tsunoda stated that "he had the potential for P1 even without late Prema crash". Tsunoda qualified sixth in Barcelona. Tsunoda would briefly lead on lap 30 after a safety car restart due to the frontrunners pitting again, but they caught up on fresher tyres, including compatriot Nobuharu Matsushita, and he dropped to fourth. He again finished fourth in the sprint race.

Tsunoda took his second pole of the year in Spa-Francorchamps. After a slow pit stop during the feature race, Tsunoda would fall behind Nikita Mazepin but fought back to him by lap 20. Mazepin would push Tsunoda wide on the penultimate lap while defending, which earned the Russian a five-second time penalty. Tsunoda would be promoted to the win having finished second on the road. In the sprint race, Tsunoda finished in ninth as a penalty for hitting Ilott at the start saw him drop out of the points due to a time penalty. He secured second in qualifying for Monza. A slow start in the feature race dropped him to fifth, Tsunoda made it up by crossing the line in fourth place. In the sprint race, mechanical woes saw him out early. In Mugello, he qualified 11th and finished eighth on the road in the feature race, but was penalised for colliding with Dan Ticktum, dropping to 16th. His disappointing weekend continued in the sprint race, as he damaged his front wing hitting the back of Felipe Drugovich on the fourth last lap, and was forced to pit which dropped him to 20th.

In Sochi, Tsunoda claimed his third pole ahead of teammate Daruvala. He settled for second place after being overtaken by Mick Schumacher, although he would win a battle over Ilott for runners-up position on the last lap. In the sprint race, Tsunoda finished in sixth. Tsunoda sat third in the standings heading into the two-month break before the final two rounds, 44 points behind leader Schumacher. In Bahrain, Tsunoda spun out on his flying lap, which left him down in last. He made an incredible charge on the alternate strategy, charging to sixth. In the sprint race, Tsunoda suffered a puncture on lap 1 cause by contact with Marcus Armstrong which ruined his race, ending in 15th. He took pole for the second Bahrain round. Tsunoda had another feature race battle with Mazepin, but the Japanese driver would win out and take another victory. In the sprint race, a last lap charge passing Ticktum would seal second place. Overall, Tsunoda took three wins, four pole positions, seven podiums and finished third in the championship with 200 points. He was the best-placed rookie and scored more points than any other driver across the feature races.

== Formula One career ==
Tsunoda's first experience driving a Formula One car came in a November 2020 test session at Imola Circuit, driving the Toro Rosso STR13. The following month, he drove for AlphaTauri in the end-of-season rookie test at Yas Marina Circuit. He completed further test sessions in the STR14 at Imola Circuit and Misano World Circuit over the winter break.

=== AlphaTauri / Racing Bulls (2021–2025) ===
==== 2021 ====
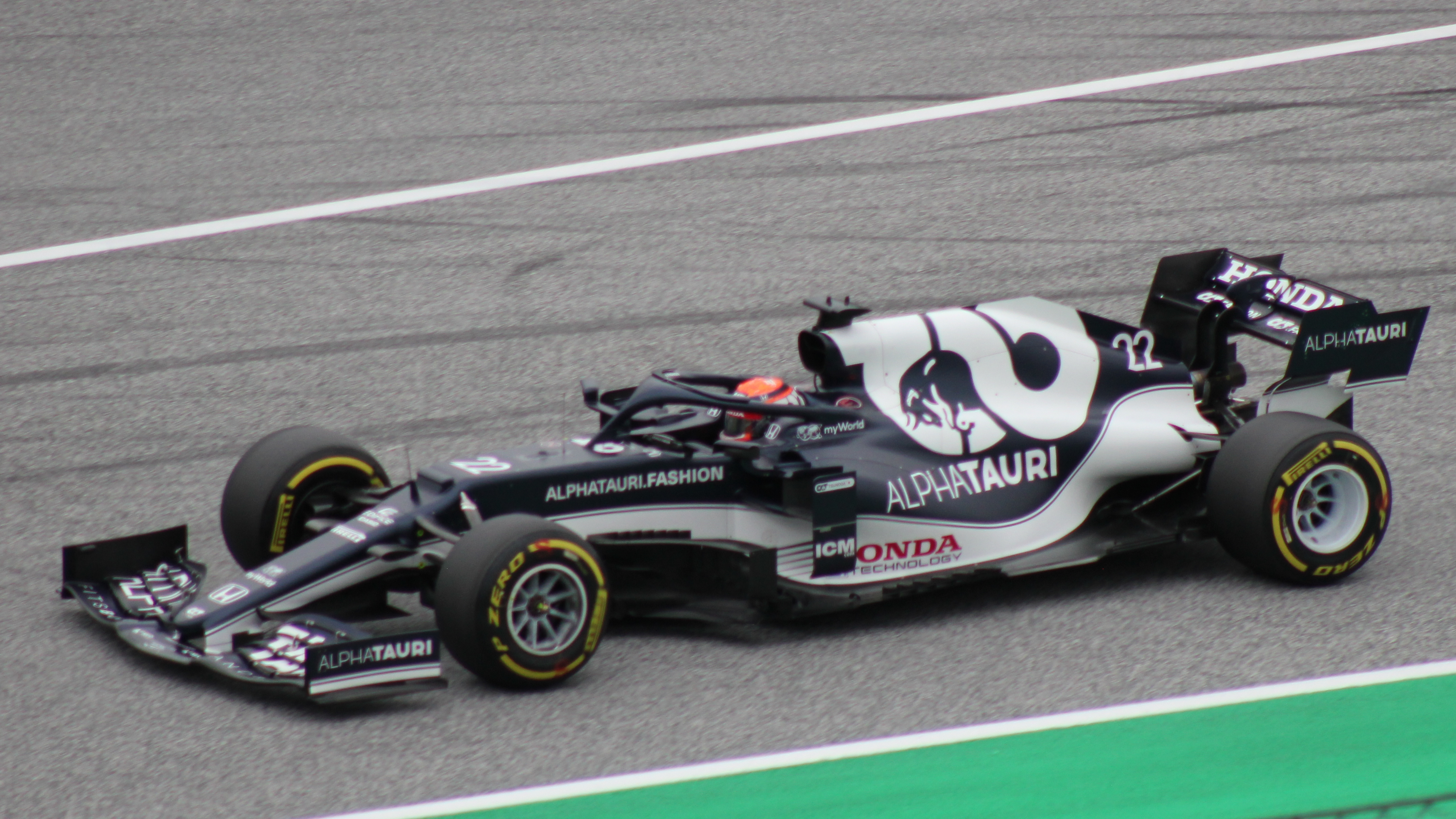
Tsunoda at the 2021 Austrian Grand Prix

Tsunoda replaced Daniil Kvyat and partnered Pierre Gasly at the Honda-powered AlphaTauri team for the 2021 season, Tsunoda became the third Japanese driver to race for the Faenza-based team after Ukyo Katayama in 1997 and Shinji Nakano in 1998 when both previously raced for Minardi. His car number is 22, as he raced with number 11 during karting but the number was taken, hence he doubled it.

At the season-opening Bahrain Grand Prix, Tsunoda qualified 13th, despite being second fastest in Q1. He finished in ninth place, having overtaken Lance Stroll on the last lap. After the race, Ross Brawn, Formula One's technical director, hailed Tsunoda as "F1's best rookie for years". He targeted an appearance in the third qualifying session (Q3) for the next race, the Emilia Romagna Grand Prix, but crashed in qualifying and started the race from the back. He made his way to ninth place before the race was red-flagged, but spun after the restart and finished 13th. He qualified 16th for the Spanish Grand Prix and later apologised after questioning whether he and teammate Gasly had "the same car". He went on to retire from the race with an electrical failure, his first F1 retirement.

He reached the Q3 for the first time at the Azerbaijan Grand Prix, but crashed in the session, causing a red flag. He finished the race seventh, his best result so far, despite being "mad" after the race due to losing two positions at the red flag restart. Tsunoda crashed again in qualifying at the French Grand Prix, was forced to start from the pit lane and finished 13th. He reached Q3 again at the Styrian Grand Prix, qualifying eighth, but received a three-place grid penalty for impeding Valtteri Bottas. He finished in tenth place despite radio miscommunications. He again reached Q3 at the Austrian Grand Prix and achieved his best qualifying result thus far with seventh. He opted for a two-stop strategy and received penalties for crossing the pit entry line, failing to score points with a 12th-place finish. He secured a point with tenth place at the British Grand Prix, having started 16th and benefited from a late pit stop from Sergio Pérez. He again qualified 16th at the Hungarian Grand Prix, but avoided the lap 1 collisions and gained from Sebastian Vettel's disqualification to be classified sixth in the race, improving his highest F1 result.

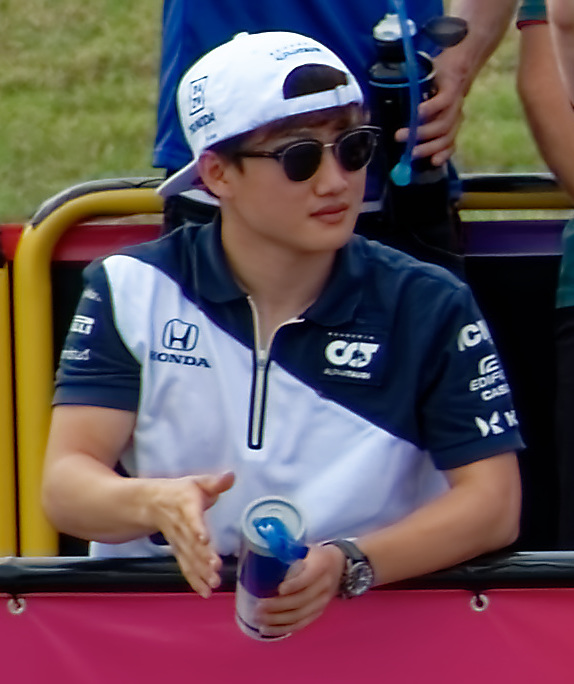
Tsunoda pictured during the Drivers' Parade at the 2021 United States Grand Prix

Tsunoda qualified 15th at the Dutch Grand Prix, but he would fail to finish the race as he retired in the pits with a power unit issue. At the following race, the Italian Grand Prix, he collided with Robert Kubica in sprint qualifying and then failed to start the race due to brake issues. In the next seven Grands Prix, Tsunoda advanced to Q3 all but once. During the Turkish Grand Prix, he held back Lewis Hamilton for numerous laps but a spin later cost him a chance of points and he finished 14th. He started tenth at the United States Grand Prix, passed teammate Gasly and finished ninth, his first points since the summer break. He qualified ninth for the Mexico City Grand Prix, but was required to start at the back due to taking additional power unit elements. He caused controversy for potentially impeding the Red Bull drivers, but was not penalised. In the race, he was eliminated on the opening lap in a collision with Esteban Ocon. A collision with Lance Stroll at the São Paulo Grand Prix resulted in a time penalty and a 15th-place finish. He qualified in the top ten at the Qatar and Saudi Arabian Grands Prix, but failed to score points in either. He apologised for his role in a collision with Sebastian Vettel at the latter. He qualified eighth in the final race of the season, the Abu Dhabi Grand Prix; notably, this was the first time all season that he outqualified teammate Gasly, who was eliminated in Q2. From this position, Tsunoda finished fourth and gained twelve points, his best ever result.

Tsunoda placed 14th in the drivers' championship with 32 points to Gasly's 110.

==== 2022 ====
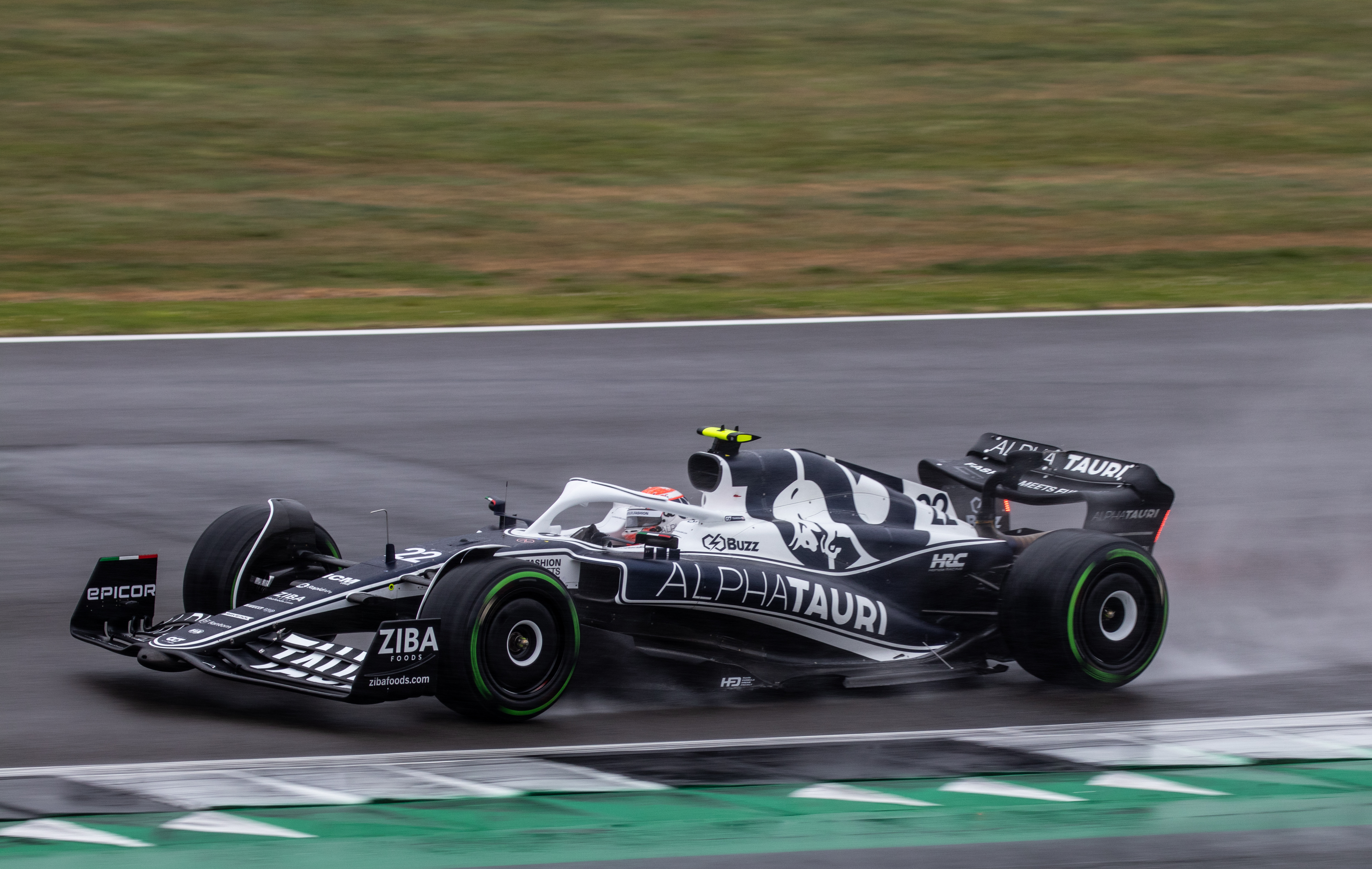
Tsunoda at the 2022 British Grand Prix

Tsunoda and Gasly were retained by AlphaTauri for the 2022 season. At the season-opening Bahrain Grand Prix, Tsunoda qualified 16th and improved to eighth in the race to score four points. A fuel issue prevented him from setting a qualifying time at the Saudi Arabian Grand Prix; he then failed to start the race after a power unit failure. At the Emilia Romagna Grand Prix, Tsunoda qualified 16th, just ahead of Gasly, and finished 12th in the sprint. He made up places in the race and passed Sebastian Vettel late on for seventh place. He described the race as the best of his Formula One career. His first Q3 appearance of the season came at the Miami Grand Prix, where he qualified ninth. However an early pit stop and lack of pace meant that he would slip to 12th at the flag. He scored points for the third time in six races at the Spanish Grand Prix, finishing tenth, having started in 13th.

A streak of twelve races without scoring points followed. Tsunoda hit the wall in qualifying for the Monaco Grand Prix, but manage to get into Q2 and qualify 11th. However, he finished the race 17th. Tsunoda qualified a brilliant eighth at the Azerbaijan Grand Prix. He was running in seventh place until he was forced to pit for repairs after a DRS failure, which led him to finish down in a disappointing 13th place. After starting from the back due to an engine penalty, he crashed whilst exiting the pits at the Canadian Grand Prix. He had further woes at the British Grand Prix, first breaking his front wing during the lap 1 chaos and later collided with Gasly on lap 10. Tsunoda finished 13th, later apologised as he ended in 14th place. He qualified eighth for the French Grand Prix. However, a first-lap collision with Esteban Ocon resulted in Tsunoda's eventual retirement after a few laps. Having qualified 16th for the Hungarian Grand Prix, Tsunoda would struggle in the race, on route to 19th place, two laps down.

At the Belgian Grand Prix, Tsunoda started from the pit lane but managed to charge to 13th place. At the Dutch Grand Prix, Tsunoda started ninth, but retired with a differential issue. He had stopped at the side of the track and loosened his seatbelts before driving back to the pits, for which he was given his fifth reprimand of the season and therefore a grid penalty for the Italian Grand Prix. At that event, he received two penalty points and another grid penalty for failing to slow for yellow flags in practice. He finished 14th. At the Singapore Grand Prix, Tsunoda qualified tenth. He would lose two places after a slight mistake, before crashing out of the race on his own on lap 35. At his first home race during the Japanese Grand Prix, Tsunoda finished the race in 13th place, ahead of teammate Gasly.

Tsunoda scored a point at the United States Grand Prix where he started 19th, gained five places on the first lap and finished tenth. This ended his long streak of not scoring points. He was running 11th at the Mexico City Grand Prix but was eliminated in a collision with Daniel Ricciardo. At the São Paulo Grand Prix, an unusual glitch in the safety car system meant that Tsunoda drove to 17th place, the only driver who was lapped during the race. At the final race in Abu Dhabi, Tsunoda missed out on points with 11th place.

Tsunoda ended the season 17th in the drivers' championship with twelve points to Gasly's 23.

==== 2023 ====
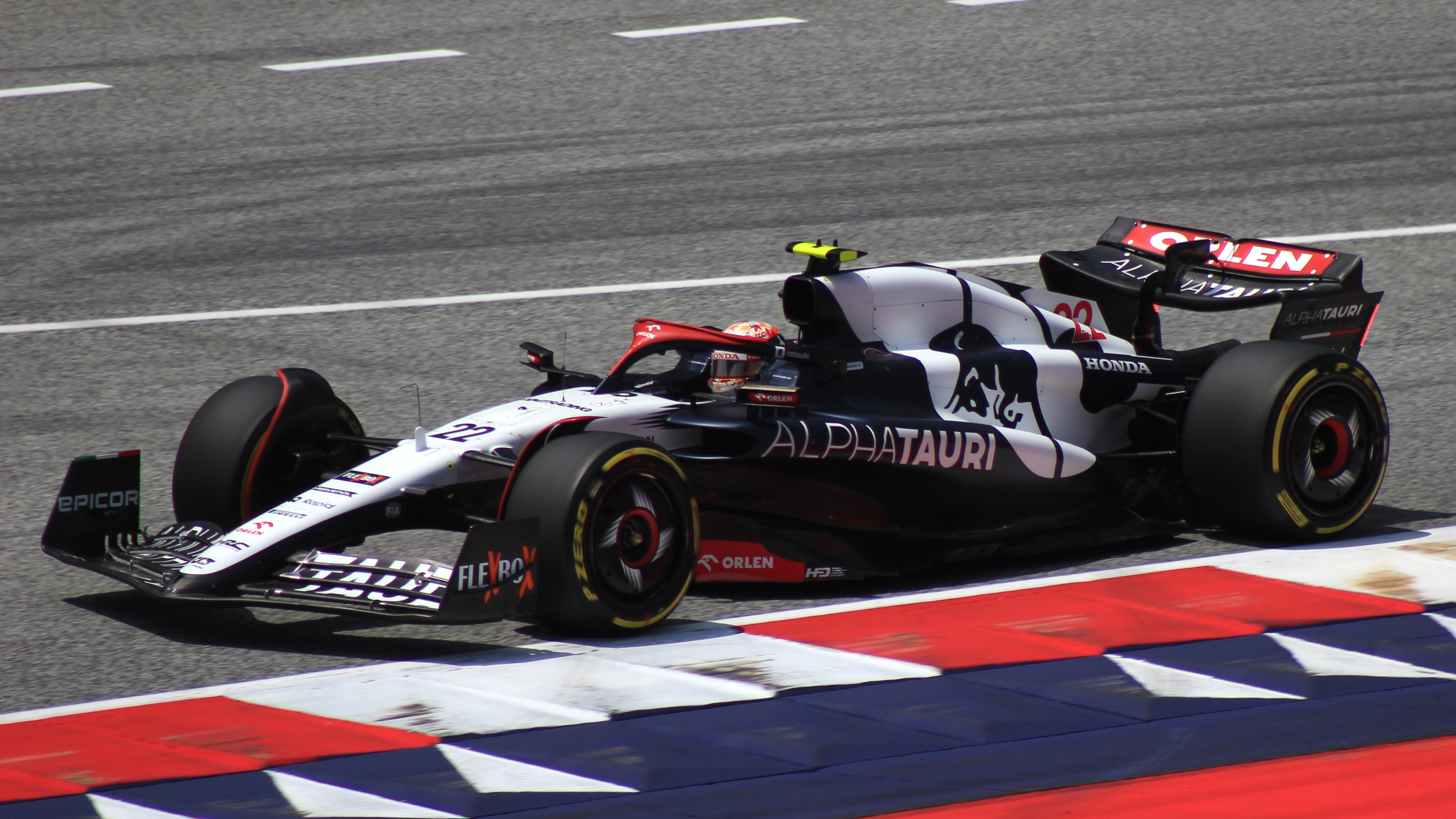
Tsunoda at the 2023 Austrian Grand Prix

Tsunoda remained with AlphaTauri for the 2023 season, partnering rookie Nyck de Vries as Gasly left for Alpine. Tsunoda finished 11th at the Bahrain Grand Prix; he had a poor start to the race and finished just over one second behind Alex Albon. At the Saudi Arabian Grand Prix, a safety car allowed Tsunoda to make his pit stop and jump up to eighth place. He was later passed by the two Alpine cars and then by Kevin Magnussen with five laps remaining, finishing 11th for the third race in succession. At the Australian Grand Prix, Tsunoda qualified 12th and ran as high as fifth when the race restarted after the second red flag, but was demoted to 11th when the order was reset after the third stoppage. A penalty for Carlos Sainz Jr. promoted him to tenth, earning his and AlphaTauri's first point of the year. Following the opening races, Tsunoda was praised for his performances.

He reached Q3 for the first time in 2023 at the Azerbaijan Grand Prix. Contact with teammate De Vries in the sprint caused him to hit a wall and eventually retire. He finished tenth in the race to score another point. At the Miami Grand Prix Tsunoda again finished 11th, closely behind Kevin Magnussen, after starting 17th. In the Monaco Grand Prix he advanced to Q3 and was running ninth when he developed brake issues, eventually dropping to 15th. He finished ninth at the Spanish Grand Prix but received a penalty for forcing Zhou Guanyu off the track, dropping him outside the points. Tsunoda later described the penalty as "ridiculous" and accused Zhou of pretending to be forced off. At the Austrian Grand Prix, his front wing broke in a collision with Esteban Ocon and he received multiple penalties post-race for track limits infringements.

From the Hungarian Grand Prix, Tsunoda was partnered with Daniel Ricciardo after De Vries was dropped by the team. He finished the race 15th, two places behind Ricciardo. He ran as high as sixth during the early laps of the Belgian Grand Prix and finished tenth, scoring his first points since April. Tsunoda was joined at AlphaTauri by Liam Lawson from the Dutch Grand Prix onwards after Ricciardo broke his hand. He ended the race behind Lawson in 15th place, having run well in the top-ten during the early stages in a dry-wet race. Tsunoda qualified 11th at the Italian Grand Prix but failed to take the start as his engine failed during the formation lap. He was then eliminated on lap one of the Singapore Grand Prix with damage from a collision with Sergio Pérez. Tsunoda made it to Q3 and qualified ninth at his home race during the Japanese Grand Prix, much to the delight of the Japanese fans. However, he went backwards on race day as he fell out of the points to 12th place at the end, finishing behind teammate Lawson.

At the United States Grand Prix, Tsunoda benefitted a position to tenth place after Fernando Alonso retired, and then pitted late on to set his first fastest lap. Having scored his first points since the summer break, this was further aided after Lewis Hamilton and Charles Leclerc were disqualified, promoting Tsunoda to eighth. He started from the back at the Mexico City Grand Prix after taking additional power unit elements. After surprisingly made his points midway through the race, his charge halted when he was tagged in a spin by Oscar Piastri, and was left to rue what could have been in 12th. In Brazil, Tsunoda was knocked of Q1 in 16th. However, in the sprint, his pace was much more promising, finishing sixth after an overtake on Hamilton. In the race, Tsunoda advanced to tenth early on at the start, but despite a tiny mistake, he was able to secure ninth place. At the season ending Abu Dhabi Grand Prix, Tsunoda qualified in a career-best sixth. Having tried an ambitious one-stop strategy, he led a race for the first time ever. It would not pay off as he hoped, holding off Hamilton for eighth place. Despite unable to help AlphaTauri overhaul Williams for seventh in the constructors, he earned Driver Of The Day in the season finale.

Tsunoda finished the 2023 season 14th in the standings, with seventeen points.

==== 2024 ====
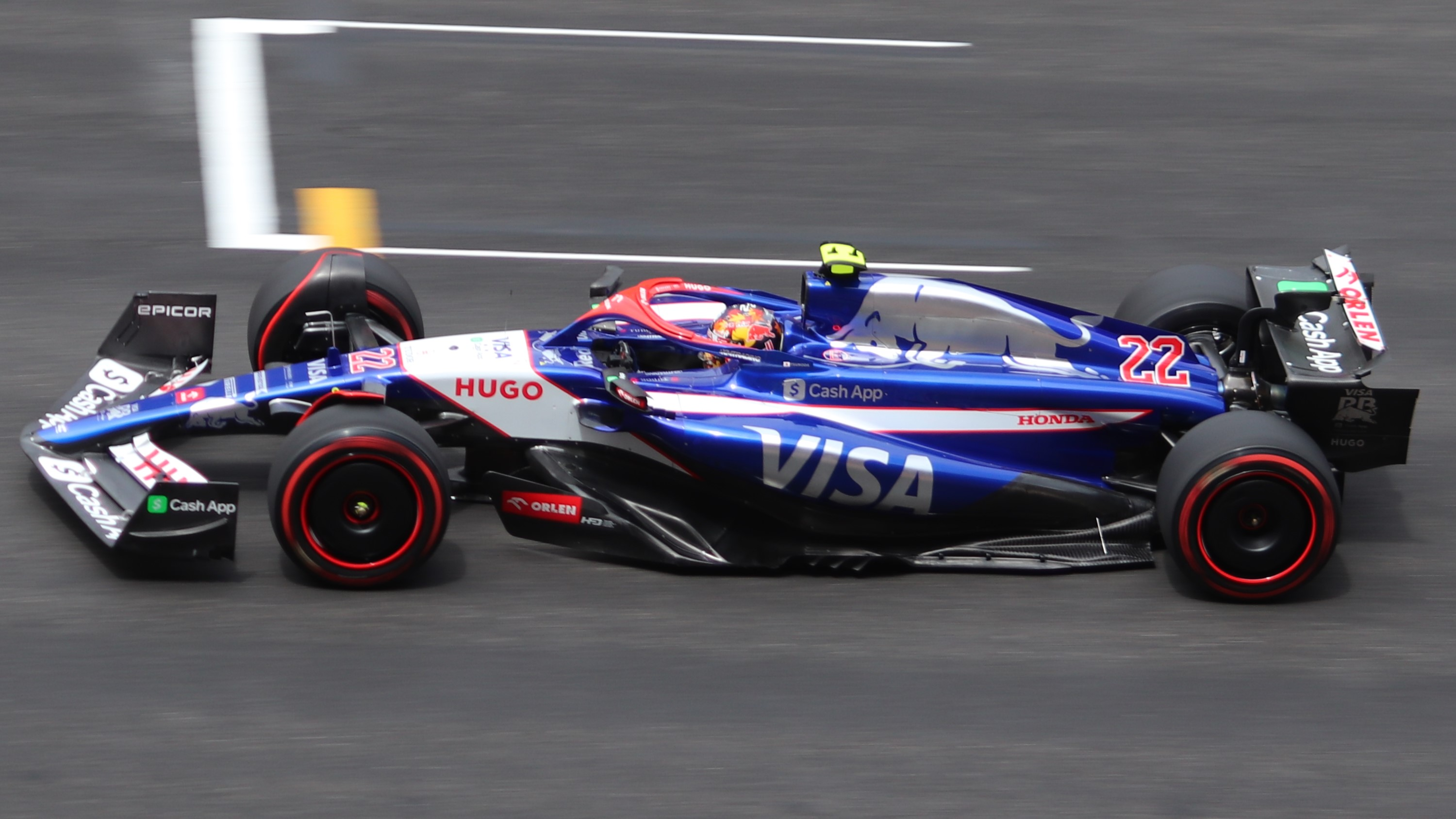
Tsunoda at the 2024 Chinese Grand Prix

AlphaTauri, which was renamed to RB Formula One Team for the 2024 season, retained Tsunoda and Daniel Ricciardo. At the season-opening Bahrain Grand Prix, starting 11th, Tsunoda was battling Kevin Magnussen for 12th but was ordered to allow teammate Ricciardo through, in which he expressed his frustration. He crossed the line in 14th, and later divebombed Ricciardo on the cooldown lap to vent further irritation. At the Saudi Arabian Grand Prix, Tsunoda achieved his first Q3 of the year qualifying ninth, but he would slip back on race day, being once again embroiled in a battle with Magnussen to eventually finish 15th. He qualified eighth in Australia. Nailing his strategy, he crossed the line in seventh place, once again being praised for making "big steps" whilst scoring his first points of 2024. Tsunoda made it to Q3 again for his home Japanese Grand Prix. Despite being stuck in the midfield mid-race, a superb second pit stop allowed him to jump his rivals and finish tenth, becoming the first Japanese driver to score points on home soil since 2012.

An unlucky Chinese Grand Prix followed, as Tsunoda was tipped into a spin by Magnussen following a safety car restart, which caused the former to retire. The sprint at the Miami Grand Prix saw Tsunoda finish eighth, securing a point. He followed it up with another seventh place in the main race, even finishing in front of Mercedes' George Russell. More points finishes followed from his Q3 appearances, placing tenth and eighth at the Emilia Romagna and Monaco Grands Prix respectively. He continued his strong qualifying performances with eighth in Canada. Having run close to teammate Ricciardo, he spun towards the conclusion of the race, leading him to finish in 14th. Struggles followed where Tsunoda failed to score points at the Spanish and Austrian Grand Prixs, despite RB introducing upgrades. Starting from 13th at the British Grand Prix, Tsunoda took advantage of the inclement weather and secured tenth place, then he backed that result up by finishing ninth at the next race in Hungary despite a big crash in Q3. He was hit with an engine penalty that confined him to the back of the grid at the Belgian Grand Prix, and struggled with pace to only finish 16th.

A tough outing at the Dutch Grand Prix followed starting 12th, where a wrong pit strategy would soon unravel his race and he eventually finished down in 17th. This was followed by back-to-back retirements at the Italian and Azerbaijan Grand Prixs, owing to collisions by Nico Hülkenberg and Lance Stroll through no fault of his own. Starting from the United States Grand Prix, Tsunoda would be partnered by Liam Lawson as he replaced Ricciardo. Qualifying 11th for the race, it would be scruffy for him, being jumped by Lawson in the pitstops and later spinning on his own, eventually finishing in 14th place. A frustrating weekend in Mexico City Grand Prix followed, crashing out in qualifying and being taken out by colliding rearwards on the opening lap by Alex Albon. Tsunoda got his best qualifying position to date at the São Paulo Grand Prix, securing third in a rain-hit session. Driving a solid race early on, Tsunoda pitted for wet tyres and was making up ground rapidly but lost out to a red flag brought out by Franco Colapinto, where drivers could make a free pit stop. He eventually finished in seventh place, benefitting a position from Oscar Piastri's penalty.

The week before the Las Vegas Grand Prix, Tsunoda was interrogated by U.S. Customs and Border Protection officers at Harry Reid International Airport for several hours whilst attempting to enter the country. He qualified ninth in Las Vegas, finishing in the same position after a battle with Nico Hülkenberg. At the Qatar Grand Prix, Tsunoda finished 16th in the sprint and 13th in the Grand Prix, on a weekend where RB lacked pace. Starting 11th for the Abu Dhabi Grand Prix, Tsunoda suffered an anti-stall during the start where he dropped to the back, and could not recover much from there as he finished 12th.

Tsunoda finished the season 12th in the drivers' championship with 30 points, his highest ever placing in Formula 1 to date.

==== 2025: Early-season success and promotion ====
Tsunoda extended his contract with Racing Bulls for his 2025 campaign, partnering FIA Formula 2 runner-up Isack Hadjar. After his early-season performances at the Australian and Chinese Grands Prix—including sixth at the latter sprint—Red Bull opened discussions to promote Tsunoda as a replacement for Liam Lawson at the parent team. He had qualified fifth and ninth, respectively, before being denied points finishes due to strategic errors at both, as well as spontaneous front wing damage in China.

=== Red Bull (2025) ===
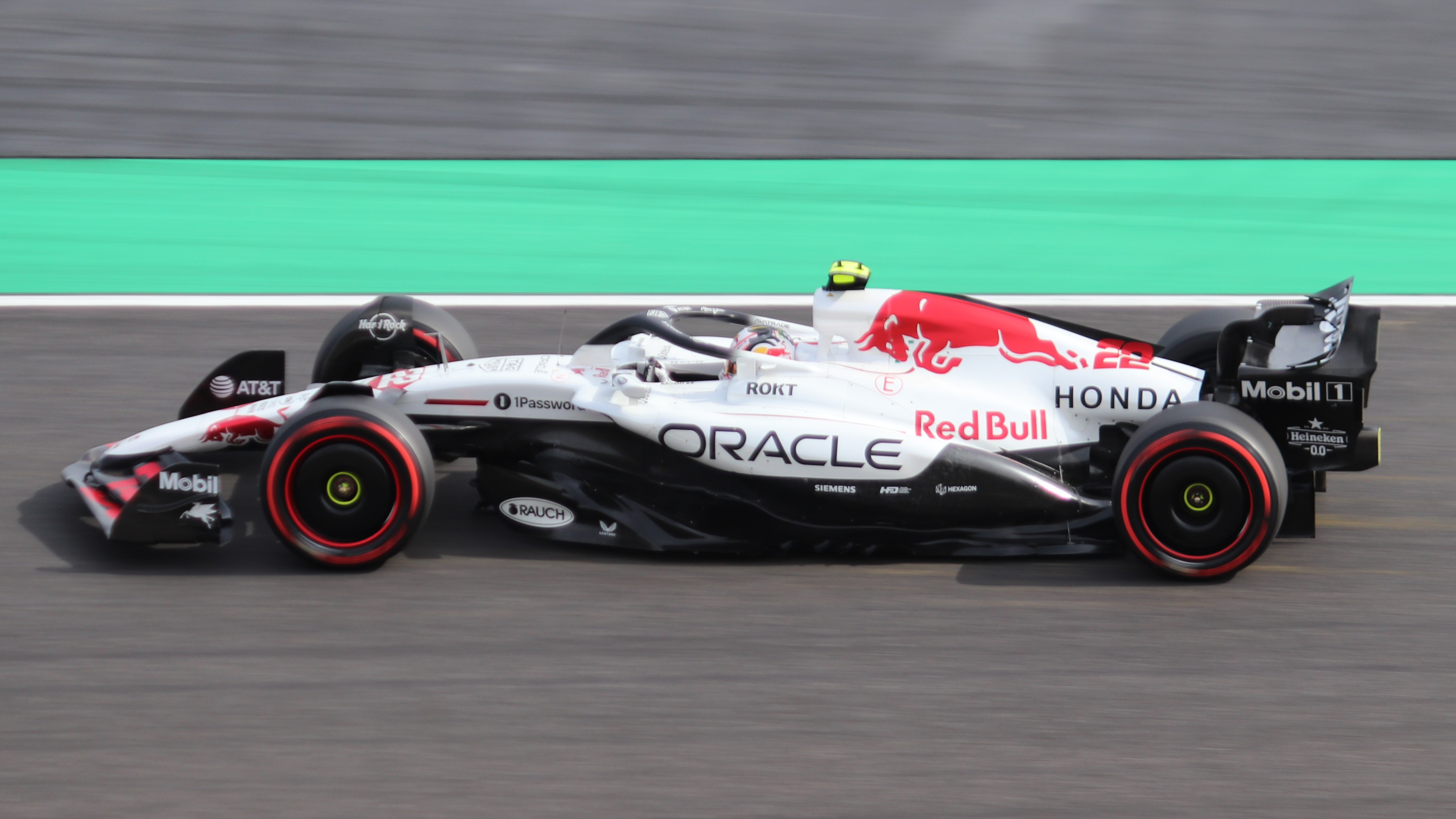
Tsunoda replaced Liam Lawson at Red Bull from the Japanese Grand Prix onwards in 2025.

Tsunoda replaced Liam Lawson at Red Bull in a swap deal from the Japanese Grand Prix onwards, partnering defending four-time World Drivers' Champion Max Verstappen for the remainder of the 2025 season. Honda offered the team €10 million to have Tsunoda promoted in time for their home Grand Prix. He qualified fourteenth and finished twelfth on debut, as teammate Verstappen won the race. He scored his first points for Red Bull with ninth at the Bahrain Grand Prix. He qualified eighth in Saudi Arabia—nine-tenths of a second behind polesitter Verstappen—before suffering race-ending damage in a lap-one collision with Pierre Gasly. In Miami, he qualified last for the rain-affected sprint and started in the pit lane, recovering to sixth after penalties for others; in the main race, he qualified and finished tenth.

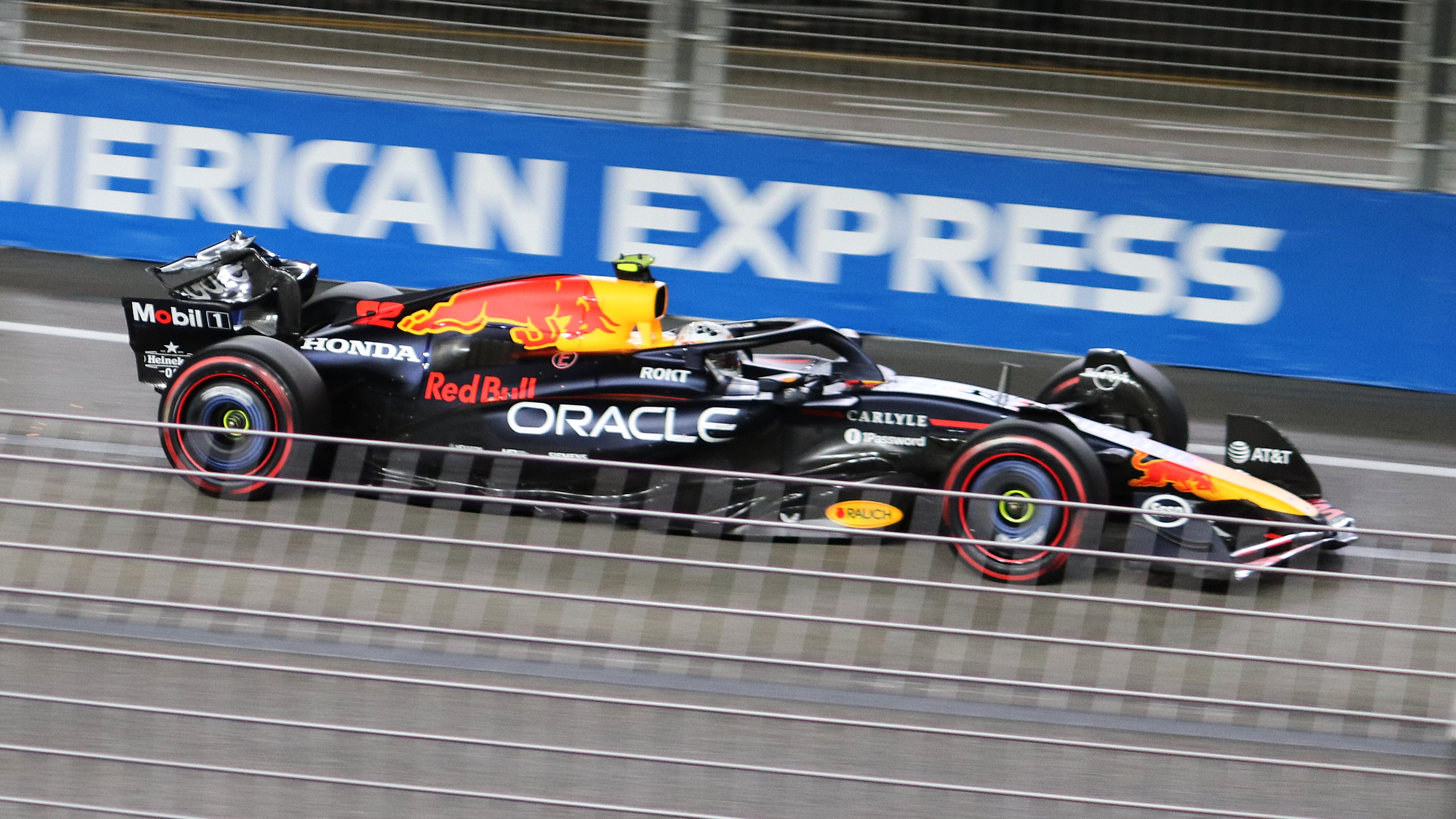
Tsunoda at the 2025 Singapore Grand Prix

A heavy crash in qualifying at Variante Villeneuve in Emilia Romagna forced Tsunoda to start from the pit lane and run an outdated RB21 for the following five Grands Prix; he recovered to tenth. He proceeded to score no points over those five weekends, where he finished: seventeenth in Monaco, having qualified twelfth before a collision with Gasly; thirteenth in Spain, having qualified last; twelfth in Canada, having started last after a grid penalty for overtaking under a red flag; sixteenth in Austria, having been penalised for colliding with Franco Colapinto; and last of the finishers in Britain, again penalised for a collision with Oliver Bearman. He received an updated specification for the wet–dry Belgian Grand Prix, qualifying seventh before a belated team decision to switch to slick tyres dropped him to thirteenth. He qualified sixteenth and finished seventeenth in Hungary, where he reduced his performance deficit to Verstappen as Red Bull struggled. In the Netherlands, he qualified twelfth and finished ninth—his first points finish in eight Grands Prix—amidst throttle issues. He qualified sixth and finished sixth in the Azerbaijan Grand Prix, his highest while with Red Bull, scoring eight points, and again impressed well in the United States, finishing seventh in both the sprint and the main race, having qualified eighteenth at the former and climbed up to seventh in the start after a Turn 1 pileup between Nico Hülkenberg, Oscar Piastri, Fernando Alonso, and Lando Norris. At the 2025 Las Vegas Grand Prix, Tsunoda qualified nineteenth and made his way up to finish in twelfth. During the Sprint qualifying session for the 2025 Qatar Grand Prix he qualified fifth, out-qualifying his teammate Max Verstappen, who qualified sixth, for the first time. Tsunoda maintained his position during the Sprint, finishing in fifth place, his highest ever finish with the team in any race format.

=== Red Bull / Racing Bulls reserve driver (2026) ===
In December 2025, Red Bull announced the promotion of Isack Hadjar for 2026 in place of Tsunoda, who would become the test and reserve driver for both Red Bull and Racing Bulls. At the 2026 Dutch, Italian and Spanish Grand Prix, Tsunoda deputised for Liam Lawson at Racing Bulls. Lawson, in turn, replaced Isack Hadjar at Red Bull after Hadjar sustained a broken wrist during the summer break. He was awarded the Overtake of the Month Award for his overtake on Pierre Gasly during the Dutch Grand Prix.

== Karting record ==
=== Karting career summary ===
Season	Series	Team	Position
2006	Nakai Inter Circuit Kids Class		1st
2007	East Japan Junior Comer 60		
2008	Mobara West Cup Series		1st
2009	East Japan – Junior Expert		3rd
2010	Haruna Cup Series – Yamaha Cadets Open		2nd
2010	Shin-Tokyo NIC Cup Series – Yamaha Cadets Open		1st
2010	JAF Junior Karting Championship – FP-Jr Cadets Class		6th
2011	Haruna Cup Series – Yamaha Cadets Open		1st
2011	Shin-Tokyo NIC Cup Series – Yamaha Cadets Open		1st
2011	JAF Junior Karting Championship – FP-Jr Cadets Class		5th
2012	JAF Junior Karting Championship – FP-Jr Cadets		3rd
2013	JAF Regional Karting Championship – FS125		1st
2013	Twin Ring Motegi Karting Race Series – X30		1st
2014	JAF All Japan Karting Championship – FS125		11th
2015	JAF All Japan Karting Championship – FS125		2nd
2016	JAF All Japan Karting Championship – KF		4th

== Racing record ==
=== Racing career summary ===
Season	Series	Team	Races	Wins	Poles	F/Laps	Podiums	Points	Position
2016	Super-FJ Okayama Series	MYST	2	2	1	2	2	40	5th
2016	Super-FJ – All-Japan Final	MYST	1	1	1	1	1	—N/a	**1st**
2016	F4 Japanese Championship	Sutekina Racing Team	2	0	0	0	1	30	16th
2017	F4 Japanese Championship	Honda Formula Dream Project	14	3	4	1	6	173	**3rd**
2017	JAF Formula 4 – East Series	Marusan MYST JSS	6	5	5	5	6	115	**1st**
2017	JAF Formula 4 – West Series	Marusan MYST JSS	1	1	1	1	1	20	7th
2018	F4 Japanese Championship	Honda Formula Dream Project	14	7	8	4	11	245	**1st**
2019	Euroformula Open Championship	Motopark	14	1	0	3	6	151	4th
2019	FIA Formula 3 Championship	Jenzer Motorsport	16	1	0	1	3	67	9th
2019	Macau Grand Prix	Hitech Grand Prix	1	0	0	0	0	—N/a	11th
2020	Toyota Racing Series	M2 Competition	15	1	0	0	3	257	4th
2020	FIA Formula 2 Championship	Carlin	24	3	4	1	7	200	**3rd**
2021	Formula One	Scuderia AlphaTauri Honda	22	0	0	0	0	32	14th
2022	Formula One	Scuderia AlphaTauri	22	0	0	0	0	12	17th
2023	Formula One	Scuderia AlphaTauri	22	0	0	1	0	17	14th
2024	Formula One	Visa Cash App RB F1 Team	24	0	0	0	0	30	12th
2025	Formula One	Visa Cash App Racing Bulls F1 Team	2	0	0	0	0	33	17th
2025	Formula One	Oracle Red Bull Racing	22	0	0	0	0	33	17th
2026	Formula One	Oracle Red Bull Racing	Test/Reserve driver						
2026	Formula One	Visa Cash App Racing Bulls F1 Team	3	0	0	0	0	1*	20th*

* Season still in progress.

=== Complete F4 Japanese Championship results ===
(key) (Races in bold indicate pole position; races in italics indicate points for the fastest lap of top ten finishers)

Year	Team	1	2	3	4	5	6	7	8	9	10	11	12	13	14	DC	Points
2016	Sutekina Racing Team	OKA; 1	OKA; 2	FUJ1; 1	FUJ1; 2	SUG; 1	SUG; 2	FUJ2; 1	FUJ2; 2	FUJ2; 3	SUZ; 1; 2	SUZ; 2; 4	MOT; 1	MOT; 2	MOT; 3	16th	30
2017	Honda Formula Dream Project	OKA; 1; 3	OKA; 2; 1	FUJ1; 1; 11	FUJ1; 2; 5	AUT; 1; 9	AUT; 2; 2	**SUG**; **1**; 5	**SUG**; **2** Ret	FUJ2; 1; 1	FUJ2; 2; 4	**SUZ**; **1**; 1	**SUZ**; **2**; 3	MOT; 1; 8	MOT; 2; 4	3rd	173
2018	Honda Formula Dream Project	**OKA**; **1** Ret	**OKA**; **2**; 1	**FUJ1**; **1**; 1	**FUJ1**; **2**; 1	**SUZ**; **1**; 1	**SUZ**; **2**; 1	FUJ2; 1; 2	FUJ2; 2; 3	**SUG**; **1**; 3	**SUG**; **2**; 1	AUT; 1; 8	AUT; 2; 11	MOT; 1; 1	MOT; 2; 2	1st	245

=== Complete Euroformula Open Championship results ===
(key) (Races in bold indicate pole position) (Races in italics indicate fastest lap)

Year	Team	1	2	3	4	5	6	7	8	9	10	11	12	13	14	15	16	17	18	Pos	Points
2019	Team Motopark	LEC; 1; 2	LEC; 2; 6	PAU; 1 Ret	PAU; 2; 3	HOC; 1; 4	HOC; 2; 1	SPA; 1; 2	SPA; 2 Ret	HUN; 1; 4	HUN; 2; 11	RBR; 1	RBR; 2	SIL; 1	SIL; 2	CAT; 1; 11	CAT; 2; 7	MNZ; 1; 3	MNZ; 2; 2	4th	151

=== Complete FIA Formula 3 Championship results ===
(key) (Races in bold indicate pole position; races in italics indicate points for the fastest lap of top ten finishers)

Year	Entrant	1	2	3	4	5	6	7	8	9	10	11	12	13	14	15	16	DC	Points
2019	Jenzer Motorsport	CAT; FEA; 10	CAT; SPR; 9	LEC; FEA; 7	LEC; SPR; 9	RBR; FEA; 16	RBR; SPR; 11	SIL; FEA; 14	SIL; SPR; 7	HUN; FEA; 9	HUN; SPR; 6	SPA; FEA; 6	SPA; SPR; 2	MNZ; FEA; 3	MNZ; SPR; 1	SOC; FEA; 12	SOC; SPR; 25†	9th	67

^{†} Driver did not finish the race but was classified as he completed over 90% of the race distance.

=== Complete Macau Grand Prix results ===
Year	Team	Car	Qualifying	Quali Race	Main race
2019	(United Kingdom) Hitech Grand Prix	Dallara F3 2019	21st	16th	11th

=== Complete Toyota Racing Series results ===
(key) (Races in bold indicate pole position) (Races in italics indicate fastest lap)

Year	Team	1	2	3	4	5	6	7	8	9	10	11	12	13	14	15	DC	Points
2020	M2 Competition	HIG; 1; 5	HIG; 2; 1	HIG; 3; 4	TER; 1; 11	TER; 2; 7	TER; 3; 3	HMP; 1; 7	HMP; 2; 16	HMP; 3; 3	PUK; 1; 4	PUK; 2; 7	PUK; 3; 4	MAN; 1; 9	MAN; 2; 7	MAN; 3; 6	4th	257

=== Complete FIA Formula 2 Championship results ===
(key) (Races in bold indicate pole position) (Races in italics indicate points for the fastest lap of top ten finishers)

Year	Entrant	1	2	3	4	5	6	7	8	9	10	11	12	13	14	15	16	17	18	19	20	21	22	23	24	DC	Points
2020	Carlin	RBR; FEA; 18	RBR; SPR; 11	**RBR**; **FEA**; 2	RBR; SPR; Ret	HUN; FEA; 16	HUN; SPR; 18	SIL; FEA; 3	SIL; SPR; Ret	SIL; FEA; 6	SIL; SPR; 1	CAT; FEA; 4	CAT; SPR; 4	**SPA**; **FEA**; 1	SPA; SPR; 9	MNZ; FEA; 4	MNZ; SPR; NC	MUG; FEA; 16	MUG; SPR; 19	**SOC**; **FEA**; 2	SOC; SPR; 6‡	BHR; FEA; 6	BHR; SPR; 15	**BHR**; **FEA**; 1	BHR; SPR; 2	3rd	200

^{‡} Half points were awarded as less than 75% of the scheduled race distance was completed.

=== Complete Formula One results ===
(key) (Races in bold indicate pole position) (Races in italics indicate fastest lap)

Year	Entrant	Chassis	Engine	1	2	3	4	5	6	7	8	9	10	11	12	13	14	15	16	17	18	19	20	21	22	23	24	WDC	Points
2021	Scuderia AlphaTauri Honda	AlphaTauri AT02	Honda RA621H 1.6 V6 t	BHR; 9	EMI; 12	POR; 15	ESP; Ret	MON; 16	AZE; 7	FRA; 13	STY; 10	AUT; 12	GBR; 10	HUN; 6	BEL; 15	NED; Ret	ITA; DNS	RUS; 17	TUR; 14	USA; 9	MXC; Ret	SAP; 15	QAT; 13	SAU; 14	ABU; 4			14th	32
2022	Scuderia AlphaTauri	AlphaTauri AT03	Red Bull RBPTH001 1.6 V6 t	BHR; 8	SAU; DNS	AUS; 15	EMI; 7	MIA; 12	ESP; 10	MON; 17	AZE; 13	CAN; Ret	GBR; 14	AUT; 16	FRA; Ret	HUN; 19	BEL; 13	NED; Ret	ITA; 14	SIN; Ret	JPN; 13	USA; 10	MXC; Ret	SAP; 17	ABU; 11			17th	12
2023	Scuderia AlphaTauri	AlphaTauri AT04	Honda RBPTH001 1.6 V6 t	BHR; 11	SAU; 11	AUS; 10	AZE; 10	MIA; 11	MON; 15	ESP; 12	CAN; 14	AUT; 19	GBR; 16	HUN; 15	BEL; 10	NED; 15	ITA; DNS	SIN; Ret	JPN; 12	QAT; 15	USA; 8	MXC; 12	SAP; 9^{6}	LVG; 18†	ABU; 8			14th	17
2024	Visa Cash App RB F1 Team	RB VCARB 01	Honda RBPTH002 1.6 V6 t	BHR; 14	SAU; 15	AUS; 7	JPN; 10	CHN; Ret	MIA; 7^{8}	EMI; 10	MON; 8	CAN; 14	ESP; 19	AUT; 14	GBR; 10	HUN; 9	BEL; 16	NED; 17	ITA; Ret	AZE; Ret	SIN; 12	USA; 14	MXC; Ret	SAP; 7	LVG; 9	QAT; 13	ABU; 12	12th	30
2025	Visa Cash App Racing Bulls F1 Team	Racing Bulls VCARB 02	Honda RBPTH003 1.6 V6 t	AUS; 12	CHN; 16^{6}																							17th	33
2025	Oracle Red Bull Racing	Red Bull RB21	Honda RBPTH003 1.6 V6 t			JPN; 12	BHR; 9	SAU; Ret	MIA; 10^{6}	EMI; 10	MON; 17	ESP; 13	CAN; 12	AUT; 16	GBR; 15	BEL; 13	HUN; 17	NED; 9	ITA; 13	AZE; 6	SIN; 12	USA; 7^{7}	MXC; 11	SAP; 17	LVG; 12	QAT; 10^{5}	ABU; 14	17th	33
2026	Visa Cash App Racing Bulls F1 Team	Racing Bulls VCARB 03	Red Bull Ford DM01 1.6 V6 t	AUS	CHN	JPN	MIA	CAN	MON	BCN	AUT	GBR	BEL	HUN	NED; 11	ITA; 10	ESP; 14	AZE	BHR	SIN	USA	MXC	SAP	LVG	QAT	ABU		20th*	1*

* Season still in progress.

Sporting positions
Preceded by Ritomo Miyata	F4 Japanese Championship; Champion; 2018	Succeeded by Ren Sato
Awards
Preceded by Zhou Guanyu	Anthoine Hubert Award; 2020	Succeeded by Oscar Piastri
Preceded by Alexander Albon	FIA Rookie of the Year; 2020	Succeeded by Oscar Piastri
