= 2024 Hungarian Grand Prix =

Formula One motor race

Race 13 of 24 in the 2024 Formula One World Championship
← Previous race	Next race →
- Layout of the Hungaroring

Race details
- Date: 21 July 2024
- Official name: Formula 1 Hungarian Grand Prix 2024
- Location: Hungaroring; Mogyoród, Hungary
- Course: Permanent racing facility
- Course length: 4.381 km (2.722 miles)
- Distance: 70 laps, 306.630 km (190.531 miles)
- Weather: Partly cloudy
- Attendance: 310,000

Pole position
Driver	(United Kingdom) Lando Norris	McLaren-Mercedes
- Time: 1:15.227

Fastest lap
Driver	(United Kingdom) George Russell	Mercedes
- Time: 1:20.305 on lap 55

Podium
First	(Australia) Oscar Piastri	McLaren-Mercedes
Second	(United Kingdom) Lando Norris	McLaren-Mercedes
Third	(United Kingdom) Lewis Hamilton	Mercedes

The 2024 Hungarian Grand Prix (officially known as the Formula 1 Hungarian Grand Prix 2024) was a Formula One motor race that took place on 21 July 2024 at the Hungaroring in Mogyoród, Hungary. It was the thirteenth round of the 2024 Formula One World Championship.

The McLarens of Lando Norris and Oscar Piastri locked out the front row, their first since the 2012 Brazilian Grand Prix. Piastri won the race for McLaren, marking his maiden victory in Formula One. Teammate Norris finished second, marking McLaren’s first 1–2 finish since the 2021 Italian Grand Prix. Mercedes driver Lewis Hamilton finished third, becoming the first driver to record 200 career podiums.

As a consequence, Norris narrowed the gap over Verstappen in the World Drivers' Championship to 76 points. In the World Constructors' Championship, Red Bull's lead in the standings decreased to 51 points after McLaren scored the maximum available points for the first time this season, overtaking Ferrari for second with 338 points, 16 points ahead of Ferrari.

== Background ==
The event was held at the Hungaroring in Mogyoród for the 39th time in the circuit's history, across the weekend of 19–21 July. The Grand Prix was the thirteenth round of the 2024 Formula One World Championship and the 39th running of the Hungarian Grand Prix as part of the Formula One World Championship.

=== Championship standings before the race ===
Going into the weekend, Max Verstappen led the Drivers' Championship with 255 points, 84 points ahead of Lando Norris in second, and 105 ahead of Charles Leclerc in third. Red Bull Racing, with 373 points, led the Constructors' Championship from Ferrari and McLaren, who were second and third with 302 and 295 points, respectively.

=== Entrants ===
The drivers and teams were the same as the season entry list with no additional stand-in drivers for the race. Oliver Bearman drove in the first free practice session for Haas, in place of Nico Hülkenberg.

=== Tyre choices ===
Tyre supplier Pirelli brought the C3, C4, and C5 tyre compounds (the three softest in their range) designated hard, medium, and soft, respectively, for teams to use at this event.

== Practice ==
Three free practice sessions were held for the event. The first free practice session was held on 19 July 2024 at 13:30 local time (UTC+2), and was topped by Carlos Sainz Jr. of Ferrari ahead of Max Verstappen of Red Bull and Sainz's teammate Charles Leclerc. The second free practice session was held on the same day, at 17:00 local time, and was topped by Lando Norris of McLaren ahead of Verstappen and Sainz. The third free practice session was held on 20 July 2024, at 12:30 local time, and was topped by Norris ahead of his teammate Oscar Piastri and Verstappen.

== Qualifying ==
Qualifying was held on 20 July 2024, at 16:00 local time (UTC+2).

=== Qualifying report ===
The first segment of qualifying was held after a spell of rain hit the circuit. The track was sufficiently dry for slick tyres to be used. Logan Sargeant crashed his Williams into the barriers at turn 1. This accident brought out yellow flags and Sargeant's car was brought in for repairs. Sergio Pérez, who had been under pressure from his Red Bull Racing team after poor results, spun into the barriers and destroyed his car, suspending the session while the barriers were repaired. During this red flag period, the rain briefly returned and the track was left wet. Daniel Ricciardo ended the segment fastest. George Russell, in the Mercedes, was caught out and was eliminated from qualifying, alongside Pérez, Zhou Guanyu and the two Alpine cars of Esteban Ocon and Pierre Gasly.

The second segment was topped by Lando Norris in the McLaren. Lewis Hamilton struggled to improve much during this session, managing a time only good enough for tenth. Nico Hülkenberg, Valtteri Bottas, Alexander Albon, Sargeant and Kevin Magnussen were eliminated from this segment.

Norris set the fastest time of the session, granting him provisional pole position. Yuki Tsunoda in the RB was involved in a heavy crash that left his chassis destroyed. Red flags were flown for the second and final time this session, and only Ricciardo (9th) was able to improve after the session was restarted. Oscar Piastri qualified second, which meant that McLaren secured a front-row lockout, their first since the 2012 Brazilian Grand Prix. Max Verstappen was third.

=== Qualifying classification ===
Pos.	No.	Driver	Constructor	Qualifying times			Final grid
Pos.	No.	Driver	Constructor	Q1	Q2	Q3	Final grid
1	4	(United Kingdom) Lando Norris	McLaren-Mercedes	1:17.755	1:15.540	1:15.227	1
2	81	(Australia) Oscar Piastri	McLaren-Mercedes	1:17.504	1:15.785	1:15.249	2
3	1	(Netherlands) Max Verstappen	Red Bull Racing-Honda RBPT	1:17.087	1:15.770	1:15.273	3
4	55	(Spain) Carlos Sainz Jr.	Ferrari	1:17.244	1:15.885	1:15.696	4
5	44	(United Kingdom) Lewis Hamilton	Mercedes	1:17.087	1:16.307	1:15.854	5
6	16	(Monaco) Charles Leclerc	Ferrari	1:17.437	1:15.891	1:15.905	6
7	14	(Spain) Fernando Alonso	Aston Martin Aramco-Mercedes	1:17.624	1:16.117	1:16.043	7
8	18	(Canada) Lance Stroll	Aston Martin Aramco-Mercedes	1:17.405	1:16.075	1:16.244	8
9	3	(Australia) Daniel Ricciardo	RB-Honda RBPT	1:17.050	1:16.202	1:16.447	9
10	22	(Japan) Yuki Tsunoda	RB-Honda RBPT	1:17.436	1:16.121	1:16.477	10
11	27	(Germany) Nico Hülkenberg	Haas-Ferrari	1:17.362	1:16.317	N/A	11
12	77	(Finland) Valtteri Bottas	Kick Sauber-Ferrari	1:17.487	1:16.384	N/A	12
13	23	(Thailand) Alexander Albon	Williams-Mercedes	1:17.280	1:16.429	N/A	13
14	2	(United States) Logan Sargeant	Williams-Mercedes	1:17.770	1:16.543	N/A	14
15	20	(Denmark) Kevin Magnussen	Haas-Ferrari	1:17.851	1:16.548	N/A	15
16	11	(Mexico) Sergio Pérez	Red Bull Racing-Honda RBPT	1:17.886	N/A	N/A	16
17	63	(United Kingdom) George Russell	Mercedes	1:17.968	N/A	N/A	17
18	24	(China) Zhou Guanyu	Kick Sauber-Ferrari	1:18.037	N/A	N/A	18
19	31	(France) Esteban Ocon	Alpine-Renault	1:18.049	N/A	N/A	19
20	10	(France) Pierre Gasly	Alpine-Renault	1:18.166	N/A	N/A	PL^{a}
107% time: 1:22.443^{b}

Notes

- ^a – Pierre Gasly qualified 20th, but was required to start the race from the pit lane for replacing power unit elements without the approval of the technical delegate during parc fermé.
- ^b – As qualifying was held on a wet track, the 107% rule was not in force.

== Race ==
The race was held on 21 July 2024, at 15:00 local time (UTC+2), and was run for 70 laps.

=== Race report ===
Pierre Gasly had changes made to his power unit during parc fermé, facilitating a pit lane start. He later retired from the race on lap 33 due to a suspected hydraulics leak. Most cars started on the medium compound tyres with some others opting for hard compound or soft compound. Polesitter Lando Norris lost position to teammate Oscar Piastri at the start. Championship leader Max Verstappen, starting from third, took second from Norris off-track. He let Norris retake second on lap 4, to avoid a potential penalty for gaining a position off track. The pit window was open by lap 17, and everyone went in for their scheduled stops, briefly giving Charles Leclerc the lead ahead of his stop. Sergio Pérez, who ended qualifying early after damaging his car, was able to recover to the points, eventually finishing seventh.

Lewis Hamilton soon saw himself engaged in a battle with Verstappen, who ended up being undercut by Hamilton and Leclerc. Verstappen, who had grown increasingly frustrated throughout the race, criticised the team's strategy calls and the handling and pace of the RB20 over team radio. Verstappen soon caught up to Hamilton and was subjected to strong defenses; later, an attempted overtake from Verstappen caused a collision between the two, prompting an investigation from the stewards. No penalty was given for the contact with the stewards determining that no driver was primarily at fault. Norris was first up to pit for mediums in an attempt to cover off the potential risk of being overtaken by Hamilton; soon after, race-leading Piastri came in for mediums. Throughout the closing stages of the race, McLaren invoked team orders asking Norris, who had gained the lead via an undercut, to swap positions with Piastri. Eventually, Norris slowed down at the start-finish straight on lap 68, giving Piastri the lead and eventual maiden race win. Hamilton rounded off the podium, becoming the first driver to record 200 career podiums. Verstappen finished in fifth after losing fourth to Charles Leclerc due to the collision with Hamilton earlier.

This was McLaren's first 1–2 finish since the 2021 Italian Grand Prix. McLaren's decision to swap Norris and Piastri was controversial, as Norris had gained a six-second lead over Piastri with the pit-stop strategy. There was doubt from McLaren management and observers that Norris would obey the team orders, with Norris being instructed to swap positions over a twenty-lap period. Norris later stated that he always intended to swap positions and that he thought it was fair to give Piastri the win. Ahead of the following Belgian Grand Prix, Norris stated he regretted that team orders had overshadowed Piastri's win and stated that he should have ceded position to his team mate sooner to avoid adding to the controversy and to allow him an opportunity to challenge Piastri for the lead if McLaren's team orders allowed it.

=== Race classification ===
Pos.	No.	Driver	Constructor	Laps	Time/Retired	Grid	Points
1	81	(Australia) Oscar Piastri	McLaren-Mercedes	70	1:38:01.989	2	25
2	4	(United Kingdom) Lando Norris	McLaren-Mercedes	70	+2.141	1	18
3	44	(United Kingdom) Lewis Hamilton	Mercedes	70	+14.880	5	15
4	16	(Monaco) Charles Leclerc	Ferrari	70	+19.686	6	12
5	1	(Netherlands) Max Verstappen	Red Bull Racing-Honda RBPT	70	+21.349	3	10
6	55	(Spain) Carlos Sainz Jr.	Ferrari	70	+23.073	4	8
7	11	(Mexico) Sergio Pérez	Red Bull Racing-Honda RBPT	70	+39.792	16	6
8	63	(United Kingdom) George Russell	Mercedes	70	+42.368	17	5^{a}
9	22	(Japan) Yuki Tsunoda	RB-Honda RBPT	70	+1:17.259	10	2
10	18	(Canada) Lance Stroll	Aston Martin Aramco-Mercedes	70	+1:17.976	8	1
11	14	(Spain) Fernando Alonso	Aston Martin Aramco-Mercedes	70	+1:22.460	7	
12	3	(Australia) Daniel Ricciardo	RB-Honda RBPT	69	+1 lap	9	
13	27	(Germany) Nico Hülkenberg	Haas-Ferrari	69	+1 lap	11	
14	23	(Thailand) Alexander Albon	Williams-Mercedes	69	+1 lap	13	
15	20	(Denmark) Kevin Magnussen	Haas-Ferrari	69	+1 lap	15	
16	77	(Finland) Valtteri Bottas	Kick Sauber-Ferrari	69	+1 lap	12	
17	2	(United States) Logan Sargeant	Williams-Mercedes	69	+1 lap	14	
18	31	(France) Esteban Ocon	Alpine-Renault	69	+1 lap	19	
19	24	(China) Zhou Guanyu	Kick Sauber-Ferrari	69	+1 lap	18	
Ret	10	(France) Pierre Gasly	Alpine-Renault	33	Hydraulics	PL	
Fastest lap: (United Kingdom) George Russell (Mercedes) – 1:20.305 (lap 55)

Notes

- ^a – Includes one point for fastest lap.

== Championship standings after the race ==
Drivers' Championship standings

Pos.	Driver	Points
1	(Netherlands) Max Verstappen	265
2	(United Kingdom) Lando Norris	189
3	(Monaco) Charles Leclerc	162
4	(Spain) Carlos Sainz Jr.	154
5	(Australia) Oscar Piastri	149

Constructors' Championship standings

	Pos.	Constructor	Points
	1	(Austria) Red Bull Racing-Honda RBPT	389
1	2	(United Kingdom) McLaren-Mercedes	338
1	3	(Italy) Ferrari	322
	4	(Germany) Mercedes	241
	5	(United Kingdom) Aston Martin Aramco-Mercedes	69

- Note: Only the top five positions are included for both sets of standings.

== See also ==
- 2024 Budapest Formula 2 round
- 2024 Budapest Formula 3 round

Previous race: 2024 British Grand Prix	FIA Formula One World Championship; 2024 season	Next race: 2024 Belgian Grand Prix
Previous race: 2023 Hungarian Grand Prix	Hungarian Grand Prix	Next race: 2025 Hungarian Grand Prix
