= 2022 Monaco Grand Prix =

7th round of the 2022 Formula One World Championship

Race 7 of 22 in the 2022 Formula One World Championship
| ← Previous race | Next race → |
- Layout of the Circuit de Monte Carlo, Monaco

Race details
- Date: 29 May 2022
- Official name: Formula 1 Grand Prix de Monaco 2022
- Location: Circuit de Monaco; La Condamine and Monte Carlo, Monaco
- Course: Street circuit
- Course length: 3.337 km (2.074 miles)
- Distance: 64 laps, 213.568 km (132.705 miles)
- Scheduled distance: 78 laps, 260.286 km (161.772 miles)
- Weather: Rain and partly cloudy in wet-and-drying track conditions

Pole position
| Driver | (Monaco) Charles Leclerc | Ferrari |
- Time: 1:11.376

Fastest lap
| Driver | (United Kingdom) Lando Norris | McLaren-Mercedes |
- Time: 1:14.693 on lap 55

Podium
| First | (Mexico) Sergio Pérez | Red Bull Racing-RBPT |
| Second | (Spain) Carlos Sainz Jr. | Ferrari |
| Third | (Netherlands) Max Verstappen | Red Bull Racing-RBPT |

The 2022 Monaco Grand Prix (officially known as the Formula 1 Grand Prix de Monaco 2022) was a Formula One motor race held on 29 May 2022 at the Circuit de Monaco in the Principality of Monaco. It was round 7 of 22 in the 2022 Formula One World Championship.

Charles Leclerc took pole in front of Carlos Sainz Jr. and Sergio Pérez. The race started with a rolling start after a 65-minute delay. Leclerc lost the race lead to strategy error and dropped down to fourth place behind Max Verstappen and Sainz, as Pérez won the race.

The result enabled Pérez to reduce his deficit to Verstappen and Leclerc, meaning that the top three drivers were covered by just 15 points heading into the next round in Baku. Red Bull increased their points advantage over Ferrari to 36 points after securing their fourth consecutive Grand Prix victory.

== Background ==
=== Championship standings before the race ===
Max Verstappen was the Drivers' Championship leader after the sixth round, the Spanish Grand Prix, with 110 points, 6 ahead of Charles Leclerc in second, with Sergio Pérez in third, 25 points behind Verstappen. In the Constructors' Championship, Red Bull Racing led Ferrari by 26 points and Mercedes by 75.

=== Entrants ===
The drivers and teams were the same as the season entry list with no additional stand-in drivers for the race.

=== Tyre choices ===
Tyre supplier Pirelli brought the C3, C4, and C5 tyre compounds (designated hard, medium, and soft, respectively) for teams to use at the event.

== Practice ==
Three free practice sessions were held per the sport's regulations. In defiance of Monaco tradition, for the first time the first two sessions were not held on Thursday but on Friday, in balance with the other Grand Prix weekends during the season. The first two practice sessions took place at 14:00 and 17:00 local time (UTC+02:00), respectively, on 27 May. Charles Leclerc led both sessions, ahead of Sergio Pérez and Carlos Sainz Jr. in the first session, and ahead of Sainz and Pérez in the second session. Both sessions also had one red flag each; in the first session, it was after Mick Schumacher stopped by the pit lane with a gearbox issue, while Daniel Ricciardo had a crash in the second session. The final session took place on 28 May, 13:00 local time, ahead of the qualifying practice session. Pèrez was the fastest ahead of Leclerc and Sainz.

== Qualifying ==
Qualifying took place at 16:00 local time (UTC+02:00) on 28 May.

=== Qualifying report ===
In the first segment of qualifying, there was a red flag after Yuki Tsunoda clipped the barrier, and Alexander Albon, Pierre Gasly, Lance Stroll, Nicholas Latifi, and Zhou Guanyu were eliminated from the session; some drivers, such as Valtteri Bottas, Gasly, Lewis Hamilton, and Zhou, were not able to have a final lap due to traffic and crossed the line on the checkered flag. In the second segment, Tsunoda, Bottas, Kevin Magnussen, Daniel Ricciardo, and Schumacher were eliminated.

In the third and final segment Sergio Pérez spun and crashed before the tunnel section, and was then hit by Carlos Sainz Jr., who saw the yellow flags too late. The red flag was thrown, and the session ended was not resumed, with the 30-seconds left on the clock not sufficient for anyone to start another lap. Charles Leclerc, who led all three qualifying sessions, took the pole position ahead of Sainz and Pérez. Championship leader Max Verstappen finished fourth, with Lando Norris, George Russell, Fernando Alonso, who crashed on his own at Mirabeau in his last flying lap, Hamilton, Sebastian Vettel, and Esteban Ocon completing the top ten.

=== Qualifying classification ===
| Pos. | No. | Driver | Constructor | Qualifying times | | | Final grid |
| Pos. | No. | Driver | Constructor | Q1 | Q2 | Q3 | Final grid |
|---|---|---|---|---|---|---|---|
| 1 | 16 | (Monaco) Charles Leclerc | Ferrari | 1:12.569 | 1:11.864 | 1:11.376 | 1 |
| 2 | 55 | (Spain) Carlos Sainz Jr. | Ferrari | 1:12.616 | 1:12.074 | 1:11.601 | 2 |
| 3 | 11 | (Mexico) Sergio Pérez | Red Bull Racing-RBPT | 1:13.004 | 1:11.954 | 1:11.629 | 3 |
| 4 | 1 | (Netherlands) Max Verstappen | Red Bull Racing-RBPT | 1:12.993 | 1:12.117 | 1:11.666 | 4 |
| 5 | 4 | (United Kingdom) Lando Norris | McLaren-Mercedes | 1:12.927 | 1:12.266 | 1:11.849 | 5 |
| 6 | 63 | (United Kingdom) George Russell | Mercedes | 1:12.787 | 1:12.617 | 1:12.112 | 6 |
| 7 | 14 | (Spain) Fernando Alonso | Alpine-Renault | 1:13.394 | 1:12.688 | 1:12.247 | 7 |
| 8 | 44 | (United Kingdom) Lewis Hamilton | Mercedes | 1:13.444 | 1:12.595 | 1:12.560 | 8 |
| 9 | 5 | (Germany) Sebastian Vettel | Aston Martin Aramco-Mercedes | 1:13.313 | 1:12.613 | 1:12.732 | 9 |
| 10 | 31 | (France) Esteban Ocon | Alpine-Renault | 1:12.848 | 1:12.528 | 1:13.047 | 10 |
| 11 | 22 | (Japan) Yuki Tsunoda | AlphaTauri-RBPT | 1:13.110 | 1:12.797 | N/A | 11 |
| 12 | 77 | (Finland) Valtteri Bottas | Alfa Romeo-Ferrari | 1:13.541 | 1:12.909 | N/A | 12 |
| 13 | 20 | (Denmark) Kevin Magnussen | Haas-Ferrari | 1:13.069 | 1:12.921 | N/A | 13 |
| 14 | 3 | (Australia) Daniel Ricciardo | McLaren-Mercedes | 1:13.338 | 1:12.964 | N/A | 14 |
| 15 | 47 | (Germany) Mick Schumacher | Haas-Ferrari | 1:13.469 | 1:13.081 | N/A | 15 |
| 16 | 23 | (Thailand) Alexander Albon | Williams-Mercedes | 1:13.611 | N/A | N/A | 16 |
| 17 | 10 | (France) Pierre Gasly | AlphaTauri-RBPT | 1:13.660 | N/A | N/A | 17 |
| 18 | 18 | (Canada) Lance Stroll | Aston Martin Aramco-Mercedes | 1:13.678 | N/A | N/A | 18 |
| 19 | 6 | (Canada) Nicholas Latifi | Williams-Mercedes | 1:14.403 | N/A | N/A | 19 |
| 20 | 24 | (China) Zhou Guanyu | Alfa Romeo-Ferrari | 1:15.606 | N/A | N/A | 20 |
107% time: 1:17.648

== Race ==
The race was due to start at 15:00 local time on 29 May and was scheduled to last for 78 laps. The race start was first delayed to 15:09, as heavy rain was identified approaching the circuit. The delay was to give teams time to switch to wet tyres before the start. Two formation laps were run at 15:16, before the decision was made to suspend the start procedure due to the rain intensity, and all cars were directed to the pit lane. In the interval between 15:16 and 16:05, a power failure to the start signalling systems, including the starting gantry and signal light panels, caused further delay. This failure, even after repaired, cast doubt on the ability to perform a standing start at all, and rolling starts were used for the rest of the race session. The two formation laps reduced the scheduled distance of the race by one lap, to 77.

=== Race report ===
The race began as the safety car led the field out of the pit lane at 16:05, with all drivers on wet tyres and a rolling start planned. Nicholas Latifi went long at the hairpin and Lance Stroll hit the barriers at Massenet while still behind the safety car; both went to the pit lane to fix their cars. On the lap 3 rolling start, pole-sitter Charles Leclerc led the race ahead of Carlos Sainz Jr., Sergio Pérez, Max Verstappen, and Lando Norris. The rain had stopped, and Pierre Gasly opted for intermediate tyres on lap 4, which was followed by other drivers at the back of the grid; he overtook Zhou Guanyu and Daniel Ricciardo on laps 12 and 15, respectively. By lap 14, Leclerc had built a lead of 4.7 seconds over Sainz, who was ahead of Pérez by 2.6 seconds, and Verstappen a few seconds further behind.

On lap 17, Pérez pitted for intermediate tyres, followed by Verstappen and Leclerc on lap 19. This left Sainz in the lead, the only driver in the top four still on wet tyres. Further back in the field, Esteban Ocon and Lewis Hamilton collided without damage on lap 18, and Ocon was given a five-second time penalty for the contact; on lap 20, Hamilton attempted to pass Ocon but did not succeed. On lap 21, race leader Sainz was instructed to pit, to swap from wet tyres directly to slick tyres. Leclerc, his teammate behind him in third, was first told via team radio to pit, and then not after he had already committed to the pit lane; both Ferrari cars pitted, with Sainz and Leclerc switching to the hard tyre. Due to Leclerc pitting immediately after Sainz (causing a delay to his servicing) and the lapped cars of Alexander Albon and Latifi on their out lap, Leclerc fell back to fourth behind Verstappen, while Sainz re-joined the track in second, behind Pérez and ahead of Verstappen, with Red Bull's overcut succeeding.

On lap 26, Mick Schumacher lost control of his car through the swimming pool section, crashing into the barriers. Although the car lost the rear and split in half, Schumacher came out of the accident unscathed. This led to a virtual safety car, then a full safety car, before the race was suspended with a red flag, given the need to repair the barriers. In red flag conditions, teams are permitted to change tyres as they choose. Both Ferrari cars kept the hard tyres they had been running on, while the Red Bull cars switched to new medium tyres. The race resumed at 17:15 under the safety car with a second rolling start. At the restart, Pérez led Sainz, ahead of Verstappen, Leclerc, George Russell, Lando Norris, and Fernando Alonso, who was able to maintain track position despite having a slower pace of several seconds. On lap 51, Norris went to the pits for medium tyres, while Zhou tried to overtake Yuki Tsunoda at the exit of the tunnel but almost lost control of the car. In the final laps, Pérez suffered graining on the tyres but was able to keep the lead and win the race, ahead of Sainz, Verstappen, Leclerc, and Russell completing the top five. Norris, Alonso, Hamilton, Valtteri Bottas, and Sebastian Vettel completed the top ten, with Ocon falling to 12th. Due to the numerous delays, the three-hour time limit for the race (including stoppages) was reached, and only 64 laps were completed.

After the race, Leclerc described the race as "a freaking disaster", and Ferrari team principal Mattia Binotto said they would investigate the strategical error. At the same time, Ferrari lodged a protest against Red Bull, alleging that both cars went over the line at the pit exit, asking for a five-second penalty, in reference to the 2020 Turkish Grand Prix, and a clarification of the rules. The stewards dismissed both protests after Ferrari conceded that the Red Bull cars tyres' did not go over the white line. The race director's notes had been wrongly copied and pasted from 2021, and the rule had been changed from 2021 from "any part of the car" to "any tyre of the car" may not cross the line; had the rules not changed, Verstappen would have broken the rule. The FIA underwent further criticism, including by Formula One owners and Hamilton, for delaying the start.

=== Race classification ===
| Pos. | No. | Driver | Constructor | Laps^{1} | Time/Retired | Grid | Points |
|---|---|---|---|---|---|---|---|
| 1 | 11 | (Mexico) Sergio Pérez | Red Bull Racing-RBPT | 64 | 1:56:30.265 | 3 | 25 |
| 2 | 55 | (Spain) Carlos Sainz Jr. | Ferrari | 64 | +1.154 | 2 | 18 |
| 3 | 1 | (Netherlands) Max Verstappen | Red Bull Racing-RBPT | 64 | +1.491 | 4 | 15 |
| 4 | 16 | (Monaco) Charles Leclerc | Ferrari | 64 | +2.922 | 1 | 12 |
| 5 | 63 | (United Kingdom) George Russell | Mercedes | 64 | +11.968 | 6 | 10 |
| 6 | 4 | (United Kingdom) Lando Norris | McLaren-Mercedes | 64 | +12.231 | 5 | 9^{2} |
| 7 | 14 | (Spain) Fernando Alonso | Alpine-Renault | 64 | +46.358 | 7 | 6 |
| 8 | 44 | (United Kingdom) Lewis Hamilton | Mercedes | 64 | +50.388 | 8 | 4 |
| 9 | 77 | (Finland) Valtteri Bottas | Alfa Romeo-Ferrari | 64 | +52.525 | 12 | 2 |
| 10 | 5 | (Germany) Sebastian Vettel | Aston Martin Aramco-Mercedes | 64 | +53.536 | 9 | 1 |
| 11 | 10 | (France) Pierre Gasly | AlphaTauri-RBPT | 64 | +54.289 | 17 | |
| 12 | 31 | (France) Esteban Ocon | Alpine-Renault | 64 | +55.644^{3} | 10 | |
| 13 | 3 | (Australia) Daniel Ricciardo | McLaren-Mercedes | 64 | +57.635 | 14 | |
| 14 | 18 | (Canada) Lance Stroll | Aston Martin Aramco-Mercedes | 64 | +1:00.802 | 18 | |
| 15 | 6 | (Canada) Nicholas Latifi | Williams-Mercedes | 63 | +1 lap | 19 | |
| 16 | 24 | (China) Zhou Guanyu | Alfa Romeo-Ferrari | 63 | +1 lap | 20 | |
| 17 | 22 | (Japan) Yuki Tsunoda | AlphaTauri-RBPT | 63 | +1 lap | 11 | |
| Ret | 23 | (Thailand) Alexander Albon | Williams-Mercedes | 48 | Mechanical^{4} | 16 | |
| Ret | 47 | (Germany) Mick Schumacher | Haas-Ferrari | 24 | Accident | 15 | |
| Ret | 20 | (Denmark) Kevin Magnussen | Haas-Ferrari | 19 | Water pressure | 13 | |
Fastest lap: (United Kingdom) Lando Norris (McLaren-Mercedes) – 1:14.693 (lap 55)

Notes

- ^1 – The race distance was initially scheduled to be completed for 78 laps before being shortened due to a red flag.
- ^2 – Includes one point for fastest lap.
- ^3 – Esteban Ocon finished 9th, but he received a five-second time penalty for causing a collision with Lewis Hamilton.
- ^4 – Alexander Albon received a five-second time penalty for leaving the track and gaining an advantage. This time penalty did not apply as he retired from the race.

== Championship standings after the race ==
Drivers' Championship standings

| Pos. | Driver | Points |
|---|---|---|
| 1 | (Netherlands) Max Verstappen | 125 |
| 2 | (Monaco) Charles Leclerc | 116 |
| 3 | (Mexico) Sergio Pérez | 110 |
| 4 | (United Kingdom) George Russell | 84 |
| 5 | (Spain) Carlos Sainz Jr. | 83 |

Constructors' Championship standings

| Pos. | Constructor | Points |
|---|---|---|
| 1 | (Austria) Red Bull Racing-RBPT | 235 |
| 2 | (Italy) Ferrari | 199 |
| 3 | (Germany) Mercedes | 134 |
| 4 | (United Kingdom) McLaren-Mercedes | 59 |
| 5 | (Switzerland) Alfa Romeo-Ferrari | 41 |

- Note: Only the top five positions are included for both sets of standings.

== See also ==
- 2022 Monte Carlo Formula 2 round

| Previous race: 2022 Spanish Grand Prix | FIA Formula One World Championship; 2022 season | Next race: 2022 Azerbaijan Grand Prix |
| Previous race: 2021 Monaco Grand Prix | Monaco Grand Prix | Next race: 2023 Monaco Grand Prix |
