= 2024 Belgian Grand Prix =

Formula One motor race

Race 14 of 24 in the 2024 Formula One World Championship
← Previous race	Next race →
- Layout of the Circuit de Spa-Francorchamps

Race details
- Date: 28 July 2024
- Official name: Formula 1 Rolex Belgian Grand Prix 2024
- Location: Circuit de Spa-Francorchamps; Stavelot, Belgium
- Course: Permanent racing facility
- Course length: 7.004 km (4.352 miles)
- Distance: 44 laps, 308.052 km (191.415 miles)
- Weather: Sunny
- Attendance: 380,000

Pole position
Driver	(Monaco) Charles Leclerc (Note: Max Verstappen set the fastest time in qualifying, but he received a ten-place grid penalty for exceeding his quota of internal combustion engine components. Charles Leclerc was promoted to pole position in his place.)	Ferrari
- Time: 1:53.754

Fastest lap
Driver	(Mexico) Sergio Pérez	Red Bull Racing-Honda RBPT
- Time: 1:44.701 on lap 44 (lap record)

Podium
First	(United Kingdom) Lewis Hamilton (Note: George Russell finished the race first, but he was disqualified as his car was found to be underweight. Lewis Hamilton, who was classified second, inherited the win.)	Mercedes
Second	(Australia) Oscar Piastri	McLaren-Mercedes
Third	(Monaco) Charles Leclerc	Ferrari
- Lap leaders: George Russell disqualified post-race, losing victory.

The 2024 Belgian Grand Prix (officially known as the Formula 1 Rolex Belgian Grand Prix 2024) was a Formula One motor race that took place on 28 July 2024 at the Circuit de Spa-Francorchamps in Stavelot, Belgium. It was the fourteenth round of the 2024 Formula One World Championship.

Max Verstappen set the fastest time in qualifying, but was relegated to eleventh following a grid penalty, with Charles Leclerc inheriting pole position in his place. George Russell of Mercedes initially won, but was disqualified after the race because his car failed to meet the minimum weight requirement. Following his teammate's disqualification, Lewis Hamilton inherited the victory, his second of the season and his last for Mercedes before his move to Ferrari, and his last win overall until the 2026 Barcelona-Catalunya Grand Prix as a Ferrari driver, Oscar Piastri finished second for McLaren and Charles Leclerc of Ferrari finished third. Russell became the first Formula One driver to be disqualified from victory in 30 years, after Michael Schumacher was disqualified at the 1994 edition of the event.

The result enabled Verstappen to increase his lead in the Drivers' Standings to 78 points over Lando Norris. Leclerc remained third, 100 points behind Verstappen, while Piastri overtook Carlos Sainz Jr. to claim fourth spot in the championship with 167 points, five ahead of Sainz. The top five in the Constructors' Standings remained unchanged, however, McLaren reduced the gap over championship leader Red Bull to 42 points, with third-placed Ferrari on 345 points, 21 behind.

== Background ==
The event was held at the Circuit de Spa-Francorchamps in Stavelot for the 57th time in the circuit's history, across the weekend of 26–28 July. The Grand Prix was the fourteenth round of the 2024 Formula One World Championship and the 69th running of the Belgian Grand Prix as a round of the Formula One World Championship.

=== Championship standings before the race ===
Going into the weekend, Max Verstappen led the Drivers' Championship with 265 points, 76 points ahead of Lando Norris in second, and 103 ahead of Charles Leclerc in third. Red Bull Racing, with 389 points, led the Constructors' Championship from McLaren and Ferrari, who were second and third with 338 and 322 points, respectively.

=== Entrants ===
The drivers and teams were the same as the season entry list with no additional stand-in drivers for the race.

=== Tyre choices ===
Tyre supplier Pirelli brought the C2, C3, and C4 tyre compounds (the middle three in their range), designated hard, medium, and soft, respectively, for teams to use at the event.

=== Track changes ===
The DRS zone leading in to turn 5 was shortened by 75 metres (246 ft).

== Practice ==
Three free practice sessions were held for the event. The first free practice session was held on 26 July 2024, at 13:30 local time (UTC+2), and was topped by Max Verstappen of Red Bull Racing ahead of Oscar Piastri of McLaren and Alexander Albon of Williams. The second free practice session was held on the same day, at 17:00 local time, and was topped by Lando Norris of McLaren ahead of his teammate Piastri and Verstappen. The third free practice session was held on 27 July 2024, at 12:30 local time, and was topped by Verstappen ahead of Piastri and Pierre Gasly of Alpine. Further running was curtailed due to bad weather conditions. The session was suspended earlier as Lance Stroll crashed his Aston Martin at Raidillon, damaging his front-left suspension and front wing.

== Qualifying ==
Qualifying was held on 27 July 2024, at 16:00 local time (UTC+2).

=== Qualifying classification ===
Pos.	No.	Driver	Constructor	Qualifying times			Final grid
Pos.	No.	Driver	Constructor	Q1	Q2	Q3	Final grid
1	1	(Netherlands) Max Verstappen	Red Bull Racing-Honda RBPT	1:54.938	1:53.837	1:53.159	11^{a}
2	16	(Monaco) Charles Leclerc	Ferrari	1:55.349	1:54.193	1:53.754	1
3	11	(Mexico) Sergio Pérez	Red Bull Racing-Honda RBPT	1:55.139	1:54.470	1:53.765	2
4	44	(United Kingdom) Lewis Hamilton	Mercedes	1:55.692	1:54.037	1:53.835	3
5	4	(United Kingdom) Lando Norris	McLaren-Mercedes	1:55.582	1:54.358	1:53.981	4
6	81	(Australia) Oscar Piastri	McLaren-Mercedes	1:54.835	1:54.136	1:54.027	5
7	63	(United Kingdom) George Russell	Mercedes	1:55.353	1:54.095	1:54.184	6
8	55	(Spain) Carlos Sainz Jr.	Ferrari	1:55.169	1:54.112	1:54.477	7
9	14	(Spain) Fernando Alonso	Aston Martin Aramco-Mercedes	1:55.489	1:54.258	1:54.765	8
10	31	(France) Esteban Ocon	Alpine-Renault	1:55.417	1:54.460	1:54.810	9
11	23	(Thailand) Alexander Albon	Williams-Mercedes	1:55.722	1:54.473	N/A	10
12	10	(France) Pierre Gasly	Alpine-Renault	1:54.911	1:54.635	N/A	12
13	3	(Australia) Daniel Ricciardo	RB-Honda RBPT	1:55.451	1:54.682	N/A	13
14	77	(Finland) Valtteri Bottas	Kick Sauber-Ferrari	1:55.531	1:54.764	N/A	14
15	18	(Canada) Lance Stroll	Aston Martin Aramco-Mercedes	1:56.072	1:55.716	N/A	15
16	27	(Germany) Nico Hülkenberg	Haas-Ferrari	1:56.308	N/A	N/A	16
17	20	(Denmark) Kevin Magnussen	Haas-Ferrari	1:56.500	N/A	N/A	17
18	22	(Japan) Yuki Tsunoda	RB-Honda RBPT	1:56.593	N/A	N/A	20^{b}
19	2	(United States) Logan Sargeant	Williams-Mercedes	1:57.230	N/A	N/A	18
20	24	(China) Zhou Guanyu	Kick Sauber-Ferrari	1:57.775	N/A	N/A	19^{c}
107% time: 2:02.873^{d}

Notes

- ^a – Max Verstappen received a ten-place grid penalty for exceeding his quota of internal combustion engine components.
- ^b – Yuki Tsunoda was required to start the race from the back of the grid for exceeding his quota of power unit elements.
- ^c – Zhou Guanyu received a three-place grid penalty for impeding Max Verstappen in Q1. He gained a position as per Yuki Tsunoda's penalty.
- ^d – As qualifying was held on a wet track, the 107% rule was not in force.

== Race ==
The race was held on 28 July 2024, at 15:00 local time (UTC+2), and was run for 44 laps.

=== Race report ===
George Russell, who started fifth, initiated a one-stop strategy in which he held off his teammate Lewis Hamilton and Oscar Piastri to cross the line in first. However, he was disqualified following the race, as his car was 1.5 kg (3.3 lb) under the 798 kg (1,759 lb) minimum weight. Hamilton inherited the win, which was the 105th of his career, with Piastri being promoted to second and Charles Leclerc, who had finished fourth before Russell's disqualification, being promoted to third, which marked his first podium finish since his win at the Monaco Grand Prix. Championship leader Max Verstappen finished 4th, extending his lead over Lando Norris, who finished fifth, to 78 points. Carlos Sainz Jr. and Sergio Pérez, the latter starting second following a spell of mediocre qualifying results, finished 6th and 7th respectively, with Fernando Alonso claiming 8th. Esteban Ocon finished 9th, scoring his first points since the 2024 Spanish Grand Prix, with Daniel Ricciardo taking his final career point with tenth. Zhou Guanyu was the only driver who retired from the race following a hydraulics failure.

=== Race classification ===
Pos.	No.	Driver	Constructor	Laps	Time/Retired	Grid	Points
1	44	(United Kingdom) Lewis Hamilton	Mercedes	44	1:19:57.566	3	25
2	81	(Australia) Oscar Piastri	McLaren-Mercedes	44	+0.647	5	18
3	16	(Monaco) Charles Leclerc	Ferrari	44	+8.023	1	15
4	1	(Netherlands) Max Verstappen	Red Bull Racing-Honda RBPT	44	+8.700	11	12
5	4	(United Kingdom) Lando Norris	McLaren-Mercedes	44	+9.324	4	10
6	55	(Spain) Carlos Sainz Jr.	Ferrari	44	+19.269	7	8
7	11	(Mexico) Sergio Pérez	Red Bull Racing-Honda RBPT	44	+42.669	2	7^{a}
8	14	(Spain) Fernando Alonso	Aston Martin Aramco-Mercedes	44	+49.437	8	4
9	31	(France) Esteban Ocon	Alpine-Renault	44	+52.026	9	2
10	3	(Australia) Daniel Ricciardo	RB-Honda RBPT	44	+54.400	13	1
11	18	(Canada) Lance Stroll	Aston Martin Aramco-Mercedes	44	+1:02.485	15	
12	23	(Thailand) Alexander Albon	Williams-Mercedes	44	+1:03.125	10	
13	10	(France) Pierre Gasly	Alpine-Renault	44	+1:03.839	12	
14	20	(Denmark) Kevin Magnussen	Haas-Ferrari	44	+1:06.105	17	
15	77	(Finland) Valtteri Bottas	Kick Sauber-Ferrari	44	+1:10.112	14	
16	22	(Japan) Yuki Tsunoda	RB-Honda RBPT	44	+1:16.211	20	
17	2	(United States) Logan Sargeant	Williams-Mercedes	44	+1:25.531	18	
18	27	(Germany) Nico Hülkenberg	Haas-Ferrari	44	+1:28.307	16	
Ret	24	(China) Zhou Guanyu	Kick Sauber-Ferrari	5	Hydraulics	19	
DSQ	63	(United Kingdom) George Russell	Mercedes	44	Underweight car^{b}	6	
Fastest lap: (Mexico) Sergio Pérez (Red Bull Racing-Honda RBPT) – 1:44.701 (lap 44)

Notes

- ^a – Includes one point for fastest lap.
- ^b – George Russell finished first, but was disqualified as his car was found to be underweight.

== Championship standings after the race ==
Drivers' Championship standings

	Pos.	Driver	Points
	1	(Netherlands) Max Verstappen	277
	2	(United Kingdom) Lando Norris	199
	3	(Monaco) Charles Leclerc	177
1	4	(Australia) Oscar Piastri	167
1	5	(Spain) Carlos Sainz Jr.	162

Constructors' Championship standings

Pos.	Constructor	Points
1	(Austria) Red Bull Racing-Honda RBPT	408
2	(United Kingdom) McLaren-Mercedes	366
3	(Italy) Ferrari	345
4	(Germany) Mercedes	266
5	(United Kingdom) Aston Martin Aramco-Mercedes	73

- Note: Only the top five positions are included for both sets of standings.

== See also ==
- 2024 Spa-Francorchamps Formula 2 round
- 2024 Spa-Francorchamps Formula 3 round

== Notes ==
Previous race: 2024 Hungarian Grand Prix	FIA Formula One World Championship; 2024 season	Next race: 2024 Dutch Grand Prix
Previous race: 2023 Belgian Grand Prix	Belgian Grand Prix	Next race: 2025 Belgian Grand Prix
