= 2024 Dutch Grand Prix =

Formula One motor race

Race 15 of 24 in the 2024 Formula One World Championship
← Previous race	Next race →
- Layout of Circuit Zandvoort

Race details
- Date: 25 August 2024
- Official name: Formula 1 Heineken Dutch Grand Prix 2024
- Location: Circuit Zandvoort; Zandvoort, Netherlands
- Course: Permanent racing facility
- Course length: 4.259 km (2.646 miles)
- Distance: 72 laps, 306.587 km (190.504 miles)
- Weather: Sunny
- Attendance: 305,000

Pole position
Driver	(United Kingdom) Lando Norris	McLaren-Mercedes
- Time: 1:09.673

Fastest lap
Driver	(United Kingdom) Lando Norris	McLaren-Mercedes
- Time: 1:13.817 on lap 72

Podium
First	(United Kingdom) Lando Norris	McLaren-Mercedes
Second	(Netherlands) Max Verstappen	Red Bull Racing-Honda RBPT
Third	(Monaco) Charles Leclerc	Ferrari

The 2024 Dutch Grand Prix (officially known as the Formula 1 Heineken Dutch Grand Prix 2024) was a Formula One motor race held on 25 August 2024 at Circuit Zandvoort in Zandvoort, Netherlands. It was the fifteenth round of the 2024 Formula One World Championship.

McLaren's Lando Norris took pole position, with Max Verstappen of Red Bull Racing starting in second. Verstappen passed Norris before the first corner of lap 1, but Norris retook the lead on lap 18. Norris led the majority of the race, took the fastest lap, and won the race for his second career victory. Norris's victory broke Verstappen's streak of pole positions and race wins at Circuit Zandvoort since its return to the Formula One calendar in 2021. Verstappen finished in second, with Charles Leclerc rounding out the podium for Ferrari.

The Dutch Grand Prix marked the last race start to date for Logan Sargeant, who was released from his Williams seat two days after the race with Franco Colapinto taking his place from the following Italian Grand Prix till the end of the season. As a consequence, Norris' win moved him to 70 points of Verstappen. Leclerc, Oscar Piastri and Carlos Sainz Jr. (ranked third through fifth) were separated by 20 points. In the World Constructors' Championship, McLaren reduced their points deficit to Red Bull to just 30 points, with Ferrari a further 34 points behind McLaren in third.

== Background ==
The event was held at Circuit Zandvoort in Zandvoort for the 34th time in the circuit's history, across the weekend of 23–25 August. The Grand Prix was the fifteenth round of the 2024 Formula One World Championship and the 34th running of the Dutch Grand Prix as a round of the Formula One World Championship.

=== Championship standings before the race ===
Going into the weekend, Max Verstappen led the Drivers' Championship with 277 points, 78 points ahead of Lando Norris in second, and 100 ahead of Charles Leclerc in third. Red Bull Racing, with 408 points, led the Constructors' Championship from McLaren and Ferrari, who were second and third with 366 and 345 points, respectively.

=== Entrants ===
The drivers and teams were the same as the season entry list with no additional stand-in drivers for the race. Robert Shwartzman drove for Sauber in place of Valtteri Bottas during the first practice session. This was the last race for Williams driver Logan Sargeant as he was replaced by Formula 2 driver Franco Colapinto for the remainder of the season.

=== Tyre choices ===
Tyre supplier Pirelli brought the C1, C2, and C3 tyre compounds (the three hardest in their range) designated hard, medium, and soft, respectively, for teams to use at the event.

== Practice ==
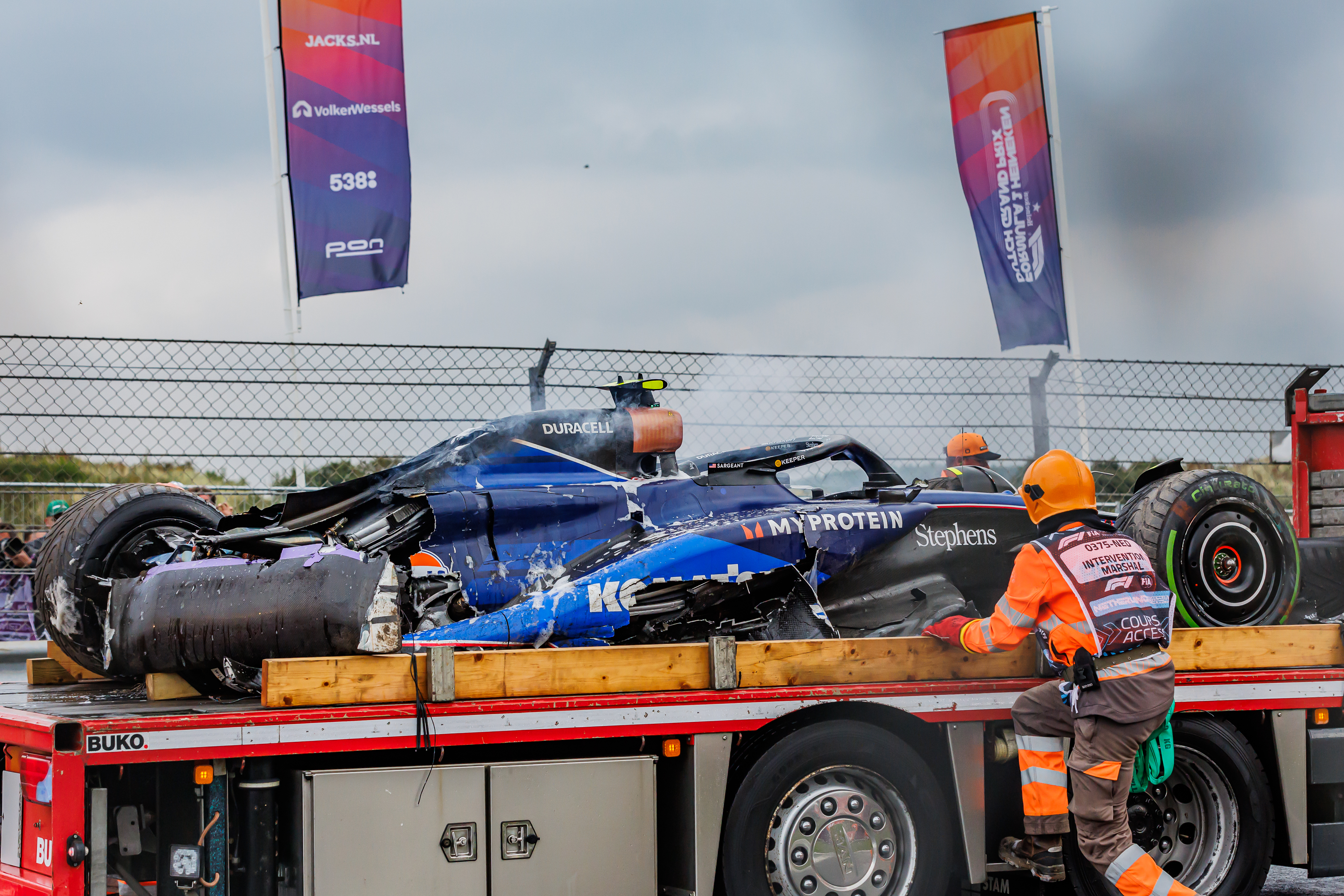
The damage done to Logan Sargeant's FW46

Three free practice sessions were held for the event. The first free practice session was held on 23 August 2024, at 12:30 local time (UTC+2), and was topped by Lando Norris of McLaren ahead of Max Verstappen of Red Bull Racing and Lewis Hamilton of Mercedes. The session was held in rainy conditions, facilitating the use of full wet tyres, and on a wet track, which gradually became dry. The second free practice session was held on the same day, at 16:00 local time, and was topped by George Russell of Mercedes ahead of Oscar Piastri of McLaren, and Russell's teammate Hamilton.

The third practice session was held on 24 August 2024, at 11:30 local time, and was topped by Pierre Gasly of Alpine ahead of Kevin Magnussen of Haas and Valtteri Bottas of Sauber. Much like the first session, it was held in rainy conditions. The session was red-flagged after Logan Sargeant of Williams was involved in a heavy crash, causing substantial damage to his car. It bottomed out on a patch of grass at the exit of turn three, sending him into a spin that made him strike the barriers at high speed, rear-end first, causing it to burst into flames. Due to this, Sargeant was unable to set a time during the subsequent qualification session, as his car was being repaired. The session was restarted at the one-minute mark, allowing drivers one lap and a practice start.

== Qualifying ==
Qualifying was held on 24 August 2024, at 15:00 local time (UTC+2).

=== Qualifying classification ===
Pos.	No.	Driver	Constructor	Qualifying times			Final grid
Pos.	No.	Driver	Constructor	Q1	Q2	Q3	Final grid
1	4	(United Kingdom) Lando Norris	McLaren-Mercedes	1:11.377	1:10.496	1:09.673	1
2	1	(Netherlands) Max Verstappen	Red Bull Racing-Honda RBPT	1:11.393	1:10.811	1:10.029	2
3	81	(Australia) Oscar Piastri	McLaren-Mercedes	1:11.541	1:10.505	1:10.172	3
4	63	(United Kingdom) George Russell	Mercedes	1:11.049	1:10.552	1:10.244	4
5	11	(Mexico) Sergio Pérez	Red Bull Racing-Honda RBPT	1:11.006	1:10.678	1:10.416	5
6	16	(Monaco) Charles Leclerc	Ferrari	1:11.370	1:10.689	1:10.582	6
7	14	(Spain) Fernando Alonso	Aston Martin Aramco-Mercedes	1:11.493	1:10.845	1:10.633	7
8	18	(Canada) Lance Stroll	Aston Martin Aramco-Mercedes	1:11.518	1:10.661	1:10.857	8
9	10	(France) Pierre Gasly	Alpine-Renault	1:11.718	1:10.815	1:10.977	9
10	55	(Spain) Carlos Sainz Jr.	Ferrari	1:11.327	1:10.914	N/A	10
11	44	(United Kingdom) Lewis Hamilton	Mercedes	1:11.375	1:10.948	N/A	14^{a}
12	22	(Japan) Yuki Tsunoda	RB-Honda RBPT	1:11.603	1:10.955	N/A	11
13	27	(Germany) Nico Hülkenberg	Haas-Ferrari	1:11.832	1:11.215	N/A	12
14	20	(Denmark) Kevin Magnussen	Haas-Ferrari	1:11.630	1:11.295	N/A	PL^{b}
15	3	(Australia) Daniel Ricciardo	RB-Honda RBPT	1:11.943	N/A	N/A	13
16	31	(France) Esteban Ocon	Alpine-Renault	1:11.995	N/A	N/A	15
17	77	(Finland) Valtteri Bottas	Kick Sauber-Ferrari	1:12.168	N/A	N/A	16
18	24	(China) Zhou Guanyu	Kick Sauber-Ferrari	1:13.261	N/A	N/A	17
DSQ	23	(Thailand) Alexander Albon	Williams-Mercedes	1:11.503	1:10.768	1:10.653	19^{c}
107% time: 1:15.976
—	2	(United States) Logan Sargeant	Williams-Mercedes	N/A	N/A	N/A	18^{d}

Notes

- ^a – Lewis Hamilton received a three-place grid penalty for impeding Sergio Pérez in Q1.
- ^b – Kevin Magnussen qualified 14th, but was required to start the race from the pit lane for replacing power unit elements without the approval of the technical delegate during parc fermé.
- ^c – Alexander Albon initially qualified eighth, but was subsequently disqualified as the floor of his car was found to not comply with the technical regulation. He was permitted to race at the stewards' discretion.
- ^d – Logan Sargeant did not take part in qualifying due to a crash during the third free practice session. He was permitted to race at the stewards' discretion.

== Race ==
The race was held on 25 August 2024, at 15:00 local time (UTC+2), and was run for 72 laps.

=== Race report ===
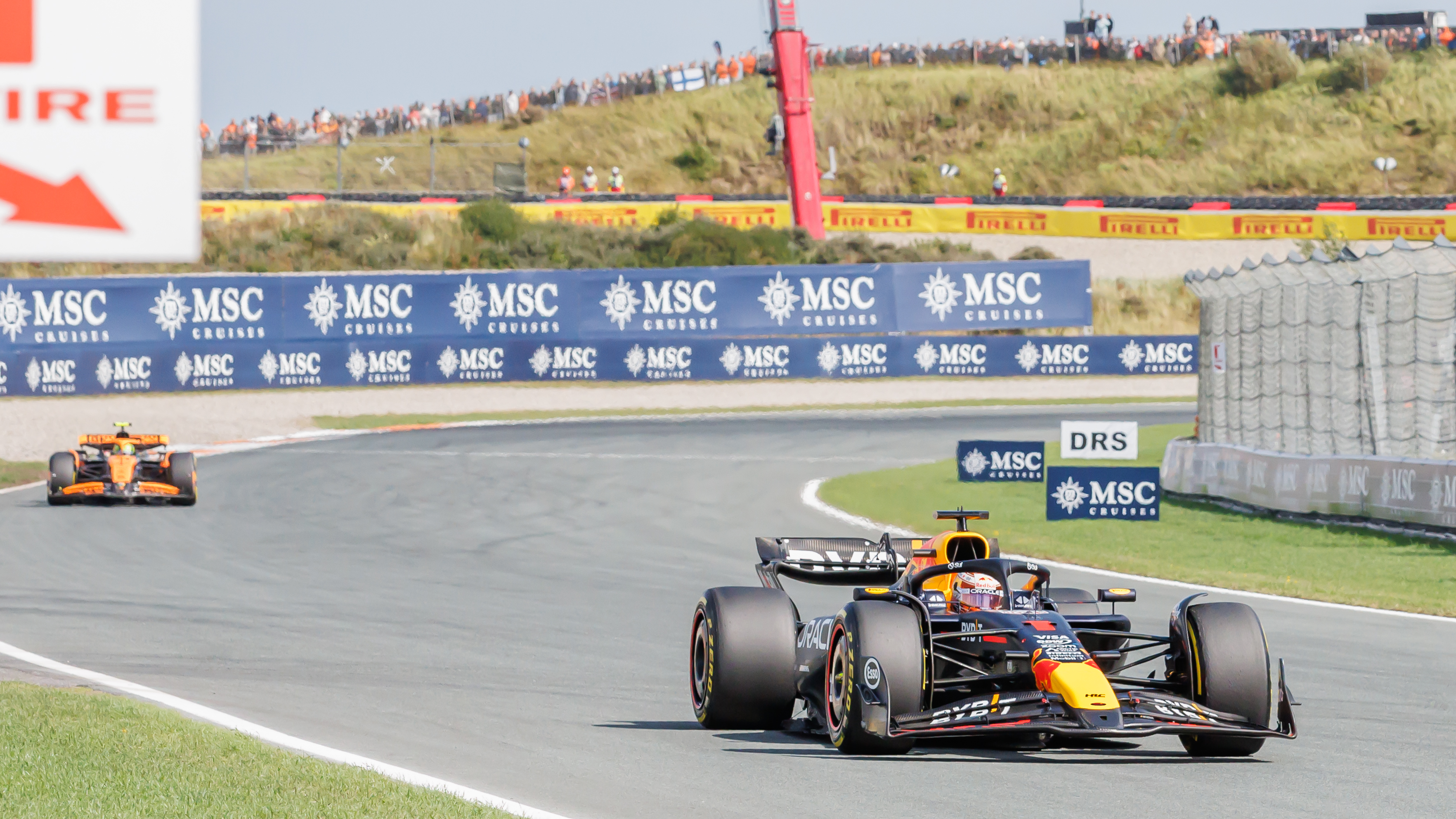
Verstappen passed Norris into turn one, lap one, holding the lead for a further 16 laps until Norris took the lead.

Lando Norris began the race in pole position. Max Verstappen, starting from second, overtook him for the lead at the start by the first corner. Verstappen managed to pull ahead by over a second, clearing DRS range. His advantage faded as he started to struggle with the handling of the Red Bull car. Norris gained over half a second on Verstappen by lap 16 and overtook him for the lead two laps later. Mercedes drivers George Russell and Lewis Hamilton opted for an extra pit stop to switch to soft tyres, in an attempt to gain the fastest lap point.

Norris won the race, converting pole to victory. He also earned an extra point for securing the fastest lap. Verstappen finished his home race in second, with Charles Leclerc completing the podium in third. Oscar Piastri, Carlos Sainz Jr., Sergio Pérez, Russell, Hamilton, Pierre Gasly, and Fernando Alonso were the remaining points finishers in the top ten. Lance Stroll was given a 5-second time penalty for speeding in the pit lane.

=== Race classification ===
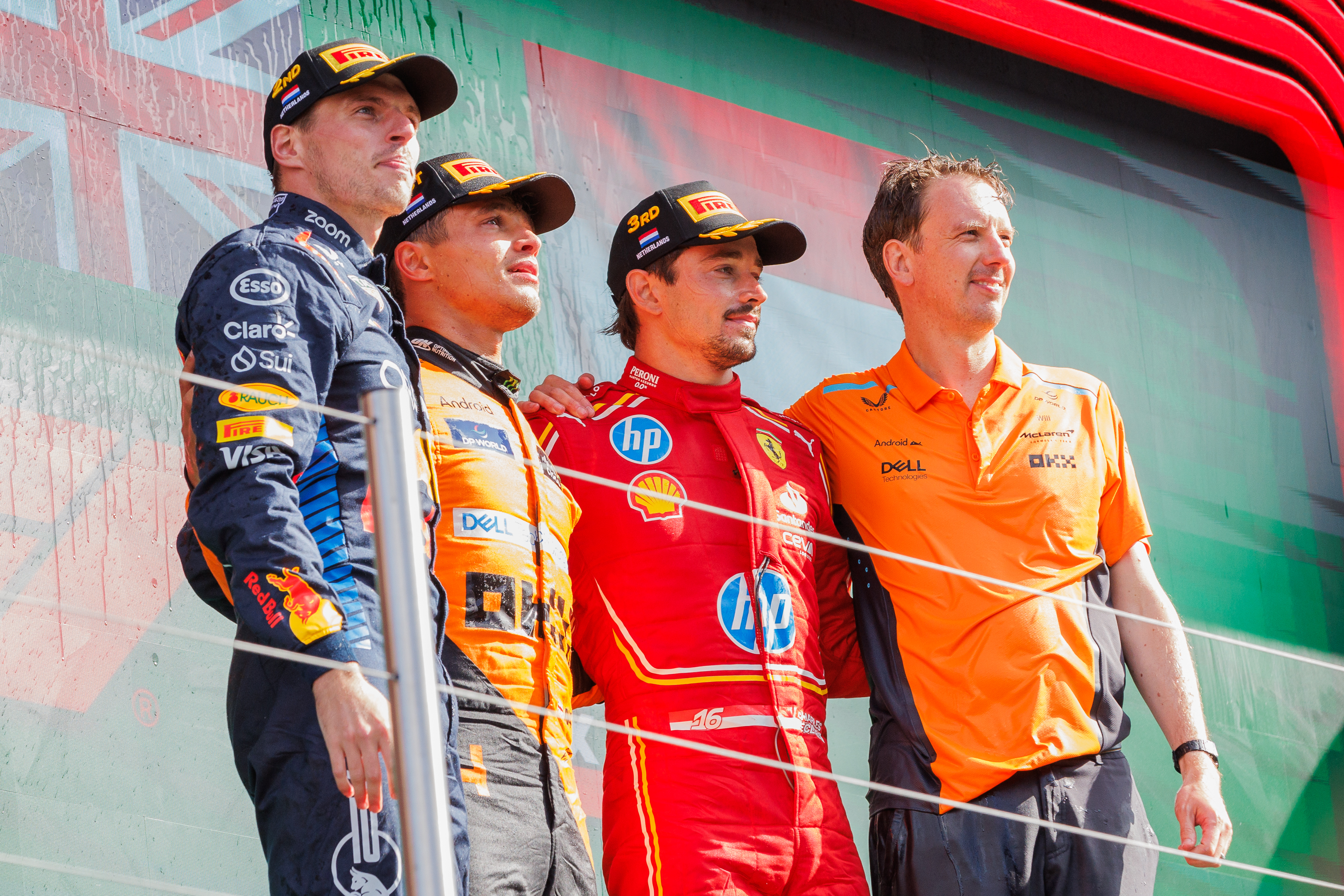
The podium ceremony after the race

Pos.	No.	Driver	Constructor	Laps	Time/Retired	Grid	Points
1	4	(United Kingdom) Lando Norris	McLaren-Mercedes	72	1:30:45.519	1	26^{a}
2	1	(Netherlands) Max Verstappen	Red Bull Racing-Honda RBPT	72	+22.896	2	18
3	16	(Monaco) Charles Leclerc	Ferrari	72	+25.439	6	15
4	81	(Australia) Oscar Piastri	McLaren-Mercedes	72	+27.337	3	12
5	55	(Spain) Carlos Sainz Jr.	Ferrari	72	+32.137	10	10
6	11	(Mexico) Sergio Pérez	Red Bull Racing-Honda RBPT	72	+39.542	5	8
7	63	(United Kingdom) George Russell	Mercedes	72	+44.617	4	6
8	44	(United Kingdom) Lewis Hamilton	Mercedes	72	+49.599	14	4
9	10	(France) Pierre Gasly	Alpine-Renault	71	+1 lap	9	2
10	14	(Spain) Fernando Alonso	Aston Martin Aramco-Mercedes	71	+1 lap	7	1
11	27	(Germany) Nico Hülkenberg	Haas-Ferrari	71	+1 lap	12	
12	3	(Australia) Daniel Ricciardo	RB-Honda RBPT	71	+1 lap	13	
13	18	(Canada) Lance Stroll	Aston Martin Aramco-Mercedes	71	+1 lap^{b}	8	
14	23	(Thailand) Alexander Albon	Williams-Mercedes	71	+1 lap	19	
15	31	(France) Esteban Ocon	Alpine-Renault	71	+1 lap	15	
16	2	(United States) Logan Sargeant	Williams-Mercedes	71	+1 lap	18	
17	22	(Japan) Yuki Tsunoda	RB-Honda RBPT	71	+1 lap	11	
18	20	(Denmark) Kevin Magnussen	Haas-Ferrari	71	+1 lap	PL	
19	77	(Finland) Valtteri Bottas	Kick Sauber-Ferrari	70	+2 laps	16	
20	24	(China) Zhou Guanyu	Kick Sauber-Ferrari	70	+2 laps	17	
Fastest lap: (United Kingdom) Lando Norris (McLaren-Mercedes) – 1:13.817 (lap 72)

Notes

- ^a – Includes one point for fastest lap.
- ^b – Lance Stroll finished 12th, but received a five-second time penalty for speeding in the pit lane.

== Championship standings after the race ==
Drivers' Championship standings

Pos.	Driver	Points
1	(Netherlands) Max Verstappen	295
2	(United Kingdom) Lando Norris	225
3	(Monaco) Charles Leclerc	192
4	(Australia) Oscar Piastri	179
5	(Spain) Carlos Sainz Jr.	172

Constructors' Championship standings

Pos.	Constructor	Points
1	(Austria) Red Bull Racing-Honda RBPT	434
2	(United Kingdom) McLaren-Mercedes	404
3	(Italy) Ferrari	370
4	(Germany) Mercedes	276
5	(United Kingdom) Aston Martin Aramco-Mercedes	74

- Note: Only the top five positions are included for both sets of standings.

Previous race: 2024 Belgian Grand Prix	FIA Formula One World Championship; 2024 season	Next race: 2024 Italian Grand Prix
Previous race: 2023 Dutch Grand Prix	Dutch Grand Prix	Next race: 2025 Dutch Grand Prix
