= Quero é Viver =

Portuguese telenovela

- Genre: Telenovela
- Based on: Casa de muñecos by Inês Gomes
- Directed by: Hugo Sousa
- Country of origin: Portugal
- Original language: Portuguese
- No. of seasons: 1
- No. of episodes: 322 (282 International Version)

Production
- Producer: Plural Entertainment
- Production company: TVI

Original release
- Network: TVI
- Release: 3 January 2022 – 18 March 2023

Quero é Viver (English title: Life is Life) is a Portuguese telenovela produced by Plural Entertainmenta dn aired from 3 January 2022 to 18 March 2023, replacing Bem me Quer and was replaced by Queridos Papás. It is adapted from the Chilean telenovela Casa de muñecos, and was adapted by Helena Amaral. It is filmed in Lisbon, Oeiras, Cascais and Arrábida.

The novela stars São José Lapa, Rita Pereira, Fernanda Serrano, Sara Barradas and Joana Seixas.

== Plot ==
Ana Margarida Rosa Lobo (São José Lapa), an actress at the end of her career, aged 70, feels that she has completed a cycle and believes that she has to make the most of the years of life that she has left, and with that, without giving explanations to no one decides to end her five-decade marriage with Sérgio (Fernando Rodrigues). Ana wants to live and enjoy a freedom she has never experienced by putting her desires, her interests and her dreams first.

Ana's decision to ask Sérgio for a divorce causes a turnaround in the professional and personal lives of her four daughters, Maria, Natália, Olga and Irene. She wants to pass on a legacy to her daughters: it's never too late to change; it is never too late to be happy; it's never too late to learn to love and value yourself. Each new day as if it were the last. And faced with this situation, the family will be tested to the limit and the four women change the way they look at life, questioning the loving relationships that they too have built.

== Cast ==
Actor/Actress	Character
São José Lapa	Ana Margarida Rosa Lobo
Fernanda Serrano	Natália Rosa Lobo Andrade
Joana Seixas	Irene Rosa Lobo Amado
Rita Pereira	Maria Rosa Lobo Furtado
Sara Barradas	Olga Rosa Lobo Sidónio
Fernando Rodrigues	Sérgio Telles Lobo
Diogo Infante	Frederico Andrade
Pedro Hossi	Santiago Amado
Filipe Vargas	José «Zé» Luís Furtado
Tiago Felizardo	Rodrigo Machado Sidónio
Thiago Rodrigues	Gabriel Menezes de Sousa
Helena Isabel	Graça Pires
Leonor Seixas	Lúcia Vaz
Isaac Alfaiate	Raúl Pires
Susana Arrais	Sofia Pombeiro Vaz
Liliana Santos	Estrela Godinho / Luísa de Jesus
Miguel Flor de Lima	Pastor Dave Formosinho
Cléo Malulo	Ivanilda Costa
João Nunes Monteiro	Rómulo Pires
Filipa Pinto	Liliana «Lili» Valente
Margarida Corceiro	Rita Vieira Menezes de Sousa
João Gadelha	Fábio Maurício
João Bettencourt	Matias Lobo Andrade
Diogo Carvalho	Tomás Alcaide de Matos
Henrique Mello	Fernando Vaz

=== Special Participation ===
Actor/Actress	Character
Rita Ribeiro	Vera
Miguel Guilherme	Rodolfo
Cucha Carvalheiro	Domingas Amado

=== Child Cast ===
Actor/Actress	Character
Tomás Sousa	Francisco Lobo Furtado
Madalena Vicente	Constança Lobo Furtado
Salvador Pires	Sebastião Lobo Amado
Laura Seiça	Beatriz Lobo Amado
Laura Leite	Matilde Lobo Cigala
Sofia Cupido	Leonor Lobo Sidónio
Tomás Andrade	Lourenço
Gustavo Benza	Raúl (child)
Luís Henrique Matos	Rómulo (child)
Beatriz Rosa	Olga (child)
Matilde Serrão	—N/a
Matilde Serrador	—N/a
Melissa Matias	Maria (child)

=== Additional Cast ===
Actor/Actress	Character
Rui M. Silva	Carlos Miguel Vaz
Duarte Melo	Guilherme Pombeiro Vaz
Ana Cloe	Susana Vieira
Rui Gonçalves	Tiago
Nélson Cabral	Faustino
Paula Luiz	Verónica
Catarina Sousa Campos	Cláudia
Sandra José	Carmen
Inês Lapa Lopes	Ana Margarida (Young)
Nuno Casanovas	Sérgio (Young)
Joana Brandão	Filipa Batalha
Lita Pedreira	Mafalda
Inês Aguiar	Dora
Ana Mafalda	Regina
Pompeu José	Quim
Carolina Castelinho	Elis
Diva O'Branco	Teresa
Camila Cerqueira	Lia
Lavínia Moreira	Mãe da Lili
Daniel Viana	Lima
Vítor Alves da Silva	Nuno Mesquitela
Eric Santos	Osvaldo
Rui Luís Brás	Dr. Ferro
Sofia Nicholson	Belicha
