= Margarida Corceiro =

Portuguese model and actress (born 2002)

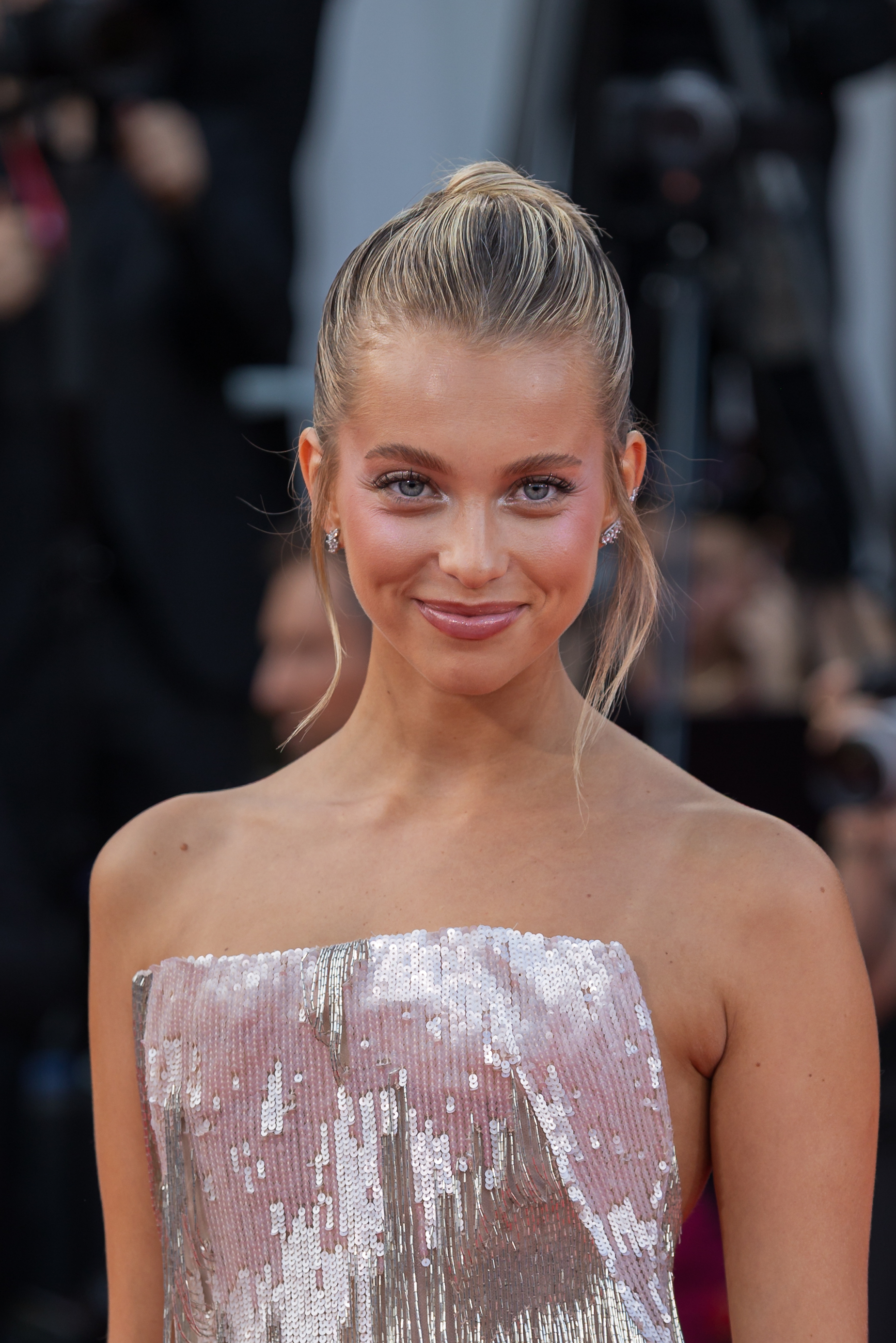
- Corceiro in 2026
- Born: Margarida Matias Ferreira Corceiro; 26 October 2002 (age 23); Santarém, Oeste e Vale do Tejo, Portugal
- Other name: Magui
- Occupations: Actress; influencer; model
- Years active: 2019–present

Margarida Matias "Magui" Ferreira Corceiro (born 26 October 2002) is a Portuguese actress and fashion model.

== Biography ==
Corceiro was born in Santarém on October 26, 2002. She is the daughter of doctors Rita Ferreira and Paulo Corceiro. She started a career as a model at 10 and later made her television debut in 2019, in the TVI production Prisioneira. In 2020 she joined the 5th edition of the Portuguese version of Dancing with the Stars. The same year she played in another Portuguese telenovela Bem me Quer, also for TVI, and in 2022 in Quero É Viver. Corceiro plays one of the lead roles in the Portuguese telenovela A Fazenda, launched by TVI on November 25, 2024.

== Personal life ==
Corceiro was in a relationship with Portuguese football player João Félix from 2019 to 2023. She dated Formula One driver Lando Norris from 2024 until early 2026.

== Filmography ==
=== Television series ===
Year	Title	Role	Notes
2019–2020	Prisioneira	Carolina Atalaia	
2020–2021	Bem me Quer	Constança Cunha Trindade de Sousa	
2022	Quero É Viver	Rita Vieira Menezes de Sousa	
2023–2024	Morangos Com Açúcar	Gabriela "Gabi" Caiado	
2024–2025	A Fazenda	Eva	
2025	Ponto Nemo	Zoe	

=== Films ===
- Hotel Amor (2025) as Patrícia
- Todo lo que nunca fuimos (2026) as Leah
