= All That We Never Were =

- Theatrical release poster
- Spanish: Todo lo que nunca fuimos
- Directed by: Jorge Alonso
- Screenplay by: Jorge Alonso; Sara Belloso
- Based on: Todo lo que nunca fuimos by Alice Kellen
- Produced by: Victor Corrales; Alejandro Miranda
- Starring: Maxi Iglesias; Margarida Corceiro
- Cinematography: Néstor Calvo Pichardo
- Edited by: Óscar Morillas
- Music by: Sergio de la Puente
- Production companies: Versus Entertainment; Lyo Media; Bixagu; Elephantec Global; CRE84U
- Distributed by: Warner Bros. Pictures
- Release dates: 3 June 2026 (Portugal); 5 June 2026 (Spain)
- Running time: 107 minutes
- Country: Spain
- Language: Spanish

All That We Never Were (Spanish: Todo lo que nunca fuimos) is a 2026 romantic drama film directed by Jorge Alonso based on the novel by Alice Kellen. It stars Maxi Iglesias and Margarida Corceiro.

== Plot ==
Wannabe painter Leah is broken after learning about her parents' death in a car crash. As her elder brother Oliver also leaves for Germany due to work-related reasons, Axel, a friend of Oliver, steps in to care for Leah, unbeknownst that she has long been infatuated for him.

== Cast ==
- Margarida Corceiro as Leah
- Maxi Iglesias as Axel
- Sebastián Zurita as Oliver
- Natalia Rodríguez as Elena

== Production ==
The film is a Versus Entertainment, Lyo Media, and Bixagu co-production with Elephantec Global and CRE84U, with the participation of HBO Max and Warner Bros. Pictures Spain.

The screen adaptation transferred the Australian fictional setting of the original novel to the Basque Country. Shooting locations in the coastline of Gipuzkoa included Zarautz and Zumaia.

== Release ==
The theatrical release in Portuguese theatres took place on 3 June 2026. Distributed by Warner Bros. Pictures, it was released theatrically in Spain on 5 June 2026.

== Reception ==
Enid Román Almansa of Cinemanía rated the film 3 out of 5 stars, declaring it a "serious" adaptation of a young adult novel, as it leans on giving the relationship a slow-burn development.

== See also ==
- List of Spanish films of 2026
