= Maxi Iglesias =

Spanish actor

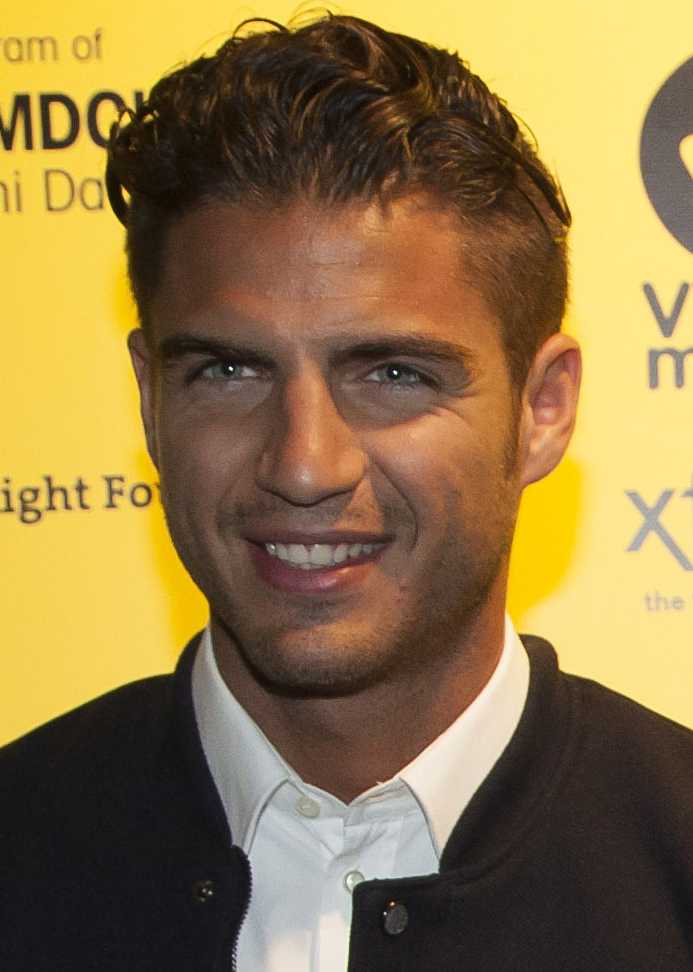
- Iglesias in March 2015
- Born: Maximiliano Teodoro Iglesias Acevedo; 6 February 1991 (age 35); Madrid, Spain
- Occupations: Actor; model; television presenter
- Years active: 1997–present
- Height: 1.77

Maximiliano Teodoro Iglesias Acevedo (born 6 February 1991), better known as Maxi Iglesias, is a Spanish actor, model, and television presenter.

== Career ==
Iglesias was born on 6 February, 1991, in Madrid, where he studied at the Colegio Cardenal Spínola. He made his feature film acting debut at the age of 6, with a minor role in My Brother's Gun.

He started his career in 2005 in Hospital Central (Telecinco), then in Cuéntame cómo pasó and Amar en tiempos revueltos (La 1), Toledo, cruce de destinos and Los protegidos (Antena 3), and professionally shot to fame thanks to his performance as César Cabano in Física o química (Antena 3). He is starring as Frank Farmer in the Spanish production of the musical The Bodyguard. Also during 2020-2023 he is a part of a famous Netflix show Valeria.

== Filmography ==
=== Film ===
Year	Title	Role	Notes
1997	La pistola de mi hermano (My Brother's Gun)	Danielito	
2008	8 citas (8 Dates)	Hermano de Juan	
2009	Mentiras y gordas (Sex, Party and Lies)	Pablo	
2009	After	García	
2010	El diario de Carlota	Lucas	
2010	XP3D (Paranormal Xperience 3D)	José	
2012	El secreto de los 24 escalones	Marc	
2014	Torrente 5: Operación Eurovegas	Príncipe azul en moto	
2015	Asesinos inocentes (Innocent Killers)	Francisco Garralda	
2016	En tu cabeza	Vecino	Segment: "Milagros y Remedios"
2019	A pesar de todo (Despite Everything)	Alejandro	
2022	Hasta que nos volvamos a encontrar (Without Saying Goodbye)	Salvador	
2026	Todo lo que nunca fuimos (All That We Never Were)	Axel	

=== Television ===
Year	Title	Role	Notes
2005	Amar en tiempos revueltos	Young Miliciano	Episode: "Antonio y Marce se alistan en el Quinto Regimiento"
2005	Hospital Central	Pablo	Episode: "En boca de todos"
2008–11	Física o química	Cabano	57 episodes
2011	Los protegidos	Ángel	14 episodes
2012	Toledo, cruce de destinos	Martín	13 episodes
2013–14	Velvet	Max	21 episodes
2015	Dueños del paraíso	Chad Mendoza	49 episodes
2016	Paquita Salas	Himself	Episode: "Casada con esto"
2016	La embajada	Roberto Marañón	11 episodes
2017	El final del camino	Alfonso I el Batallador	Episode: "La catedral de Santiago"
2017	Ingobernable	Ovni	14 episodes
2019	Velvet Colección	Max	1 episode
2020–2023	Valeria	Victor	Main role
2020	Desaparecidos	Rodrigo Medina	Main
2021	La cocinera de Castamar	Francisco Marlango, Count of Armiño	
2023	Volver a caer	Vico	Main role
