= Lando Norris =

British racing driver (born 1999)

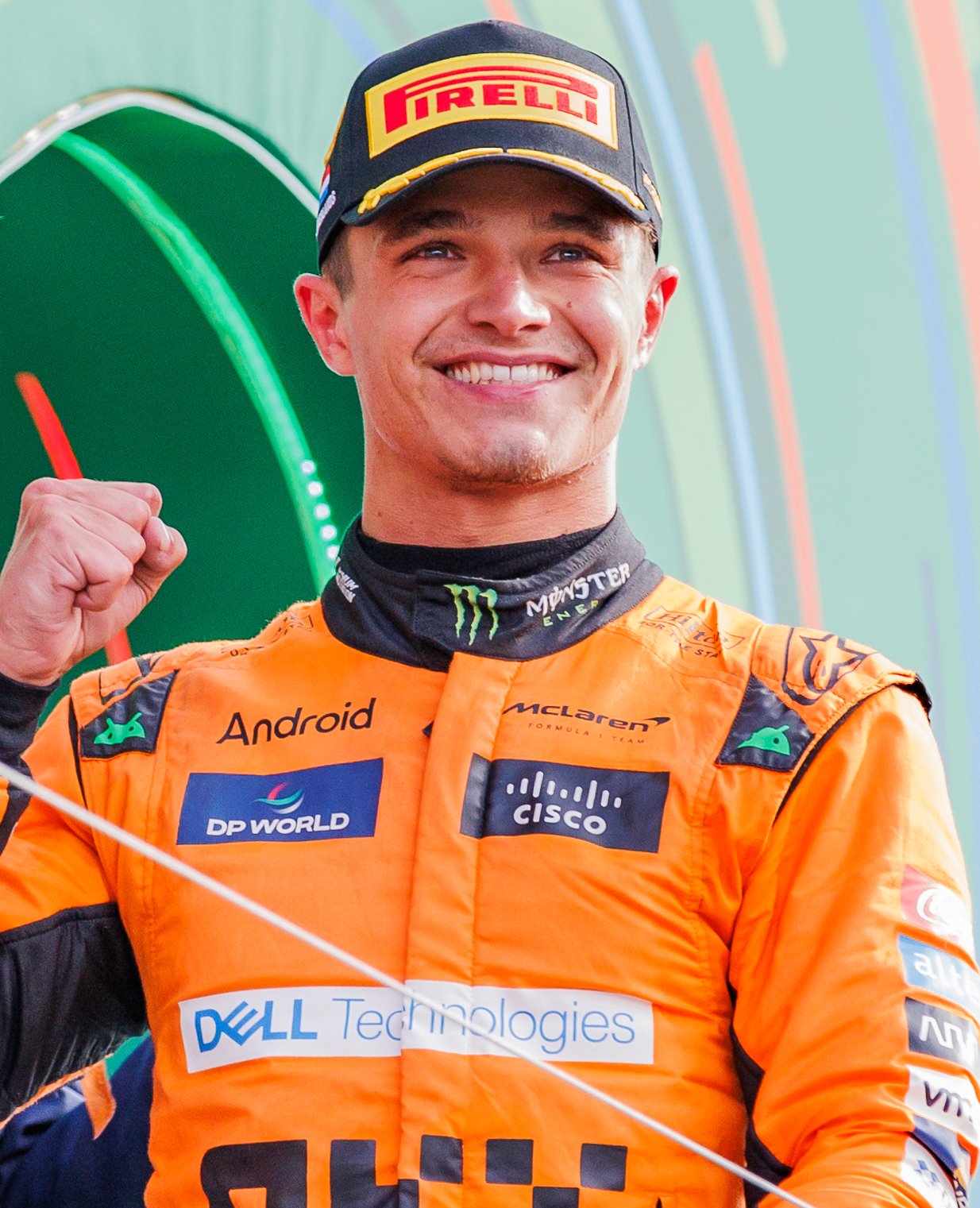
- Norris at the 2024 Dutch Grand Prix
- Born: 13 November 1999 (age 27); Bristol, England
- Awards: Full list

Formula One World Championship career
- Nationality: (United Kingdom) British
- 2026 team: McLaren-Mercedes
- Car number: 4; 1 (2026) (Note: Norris has competed using the number 1 during his World Drivers' Championship defence in 2026.)
- Entries: 172 (171 starts)
- Championships: 1 (2025)
- Wins: 14
- Podiums: 50
- Career points: 1676
- Pole positions: 20
- Fastest laps: 20
- First entry: 2019 Australian Grand Prix
- First win: 2024 Miami Grand Prix
- Last win: 2026 São Paulo Grand Prix
- Last entry: 2026 São Paulo Grand Prix
- 2025 position: 1st (423 pts)

Previous series
- 2017–2018; 2016–2017; 2016; 2016; 2016; 2016; 2015; 2015; 2015; 2015; 2014: FIA Formula 2; FIA F3 European; Formula Renault Eurocup; Formula Renault NEC; BRDC British F3; Toyota Racing Series; MSA Formula; BRDC F4 Autumn Trophy; Italian F4; ADAC F4; Ginetta Junior

Championship titles
- 2017; 2016; 2016; 2016; 2015: FIA F3 European; Formula Renault Eurocup; Formula Renault NEC; Toyota Racing Series; MSA Formula
- Website: landonorris.com

Lando Norris (/ˈlændoʊ/; born 13 November 1999) is a British racing driver who competes in Formula One for McLaren. Norris won the Formula One World Drivers' Championship in 2025 with McLaren, and has won 14 Grands Prix across eight seasons.

Born in Bristol and raised near Glastonbury to an English father and Belgian mother, Norris began competitive kart racing aged eight. After a successful karting career—culminating in his victory at the senior World Championship in 2014—Norris graduated to junior formulae. He won his first title at the 2015 MSA Formula Championship with Carlin. He then won the Toyota Racing Series, Formula Renault Eurocup, and Formula Renault NEC in 2016, receiving the Autosport BRDC Award that year. Norris won the FIA Formula 3 European Championship in 2017, and finished runner-up to George Russell in the FIA Formula 2 Championship in 2018, both with Carlin.

A member of the McLaren Young Driver Programme since 2017, Norris joined McLaren in 2019 to partner Carlos Sainz Jr., making his Formula One debut at the Australian Grand Prix. He achieved his maiden podium finish and fastest lap at the season-opening Austrian Grand Prix in 2020, before achieving his maiden pole position at the Russian Grand Prix in 2021, amongst several further podiums. Following another podium in 2022, he took seven across his 2023 campaign. In 2024, Norris achieved his maiden win at the Miami Grand Prix, repeating this feat three times as he finished runner-up to Max Verstappen in the World Drivers' Championship. He took seven further victories in 2025, including his home Grand Prix in Britain, as he won his maiden title in a battle with Verstappen and teammate Oscar Piastri.

Norris was listed in the 2026 edition of Time as one of the 100 most influential people in the world. He won the Laureus World Sports Award for Breakthrough of the Year in 2026. In the same year, Norris co-founded LN4 Fusion, a junior single-seater racing team. As of the 2026 São Paulo Grand Prix, Norris has achieved 14 race wins, 20 pole positions, 20 fastest laps, and 50 podiums in Formula One. He is contracted to remain at McLaren until at least the end of the 2030 season.

== Early life and education ==
Norris was born on 13 November 1999 in Bristol, England and later grew up near Glastonbury on a small farm. His father, Adam Norris, was the managing director of Pensions Direct, the pension arm of Hargreaves Lansdown, which grew into the UK's largest retailer of pensions. He is the founder and CEO of the e-scooter company Pure Electric. His mother, Cisca Norris (née Wauman), is from the Flanders region of Belgium near Sint-Niklaas and gave him the name "Lando". Norris holds both British and Belgian citizenship and speaks a small amount of Dutch. He has three siblings—two younger sisters and an older brother, who was also involved in Kart racing on a competitive level until 2014.

At age three, his mother wanted him to try horse riding, but he heavily disliked it. Norris grew up watching his father play Gran Turismo on the PlayStation 2 and started to play when he was four years old, wanting to beat him. Long before he ever watched Formula One, Norris developed a passion for off-road dirt motorsports, first getting a quad bike at age four, which he drove in the backyard and on the fields. His father secretly sold it shortly after, because he deemed it too dangerous, but told a young Lando that it had been stolen to prevent him from being upset. Norris transitioned to motocross and developed an early fascination with MotoGP. His childhood hero was MotoGP driver Valentino Rossi, whose fluorescent-yellow helmet design would later be an inspiration for Norris' own helmet designs throughout his motorsport career. As a child, he would cut the grass with the family's lawn mower almost every day, desperate to drive anything with an engine. But as Norris was relatively small for his age, he had to put his father's old dumbbells on the seat to reach the minimum weight limit to even start the mower.

Norris started karting at age eight at Clay Pigeon Raceway near Dorchester after his father took him and his older brother Oliver to watch the national British Kart Championships at the same track. Norris' first helmet in karting featured a big sun on each side, honouring Valentino Rossi's iconic sun and moon design. Because Norris was still small in size for his age, he was struggling with remaining in his kart seat while racing. His team found an original solution by putting Velcro on the seat and on the back of his race suit to keep him from moving too much. Having a passion for graphic design, Norris's first job as a young teenager in his karting days was designing and selling custom visor stickers to his racing rivals. Norris was educated at Chew Stoke Church School and later at Millfield School in Street, Somerset. He joined the prep school in year two and moved to the senior school aged 13, before leaving in year 10 at age 16 without taking his GCSEs, opting to study with a personal tutor to concentrate on his racing career.

== Junior racing career ==
=== Karting (2008–2014) ===
Norris started his racing career at the age of eight when he claimed pole position at his first national event. In 2013, Norris competed in KF-Junior class, winning the CIK-FIA European Championship and the CIK-FIA International Super Cup, as well as the WSK Euro Series. The following year he won the CIK-FIA World Championship in KF class with Ricky Flynn Motorsport, making him the youngest karting world champion in that category.

=== Ginetta Junior (2014) ===
In 2014, Norris made his car racing debut in the Ginetta Junior Championship, a support series to the British Touring Car Championship. He finished third in the championship, winning four races and claiming the Rookie Cup.

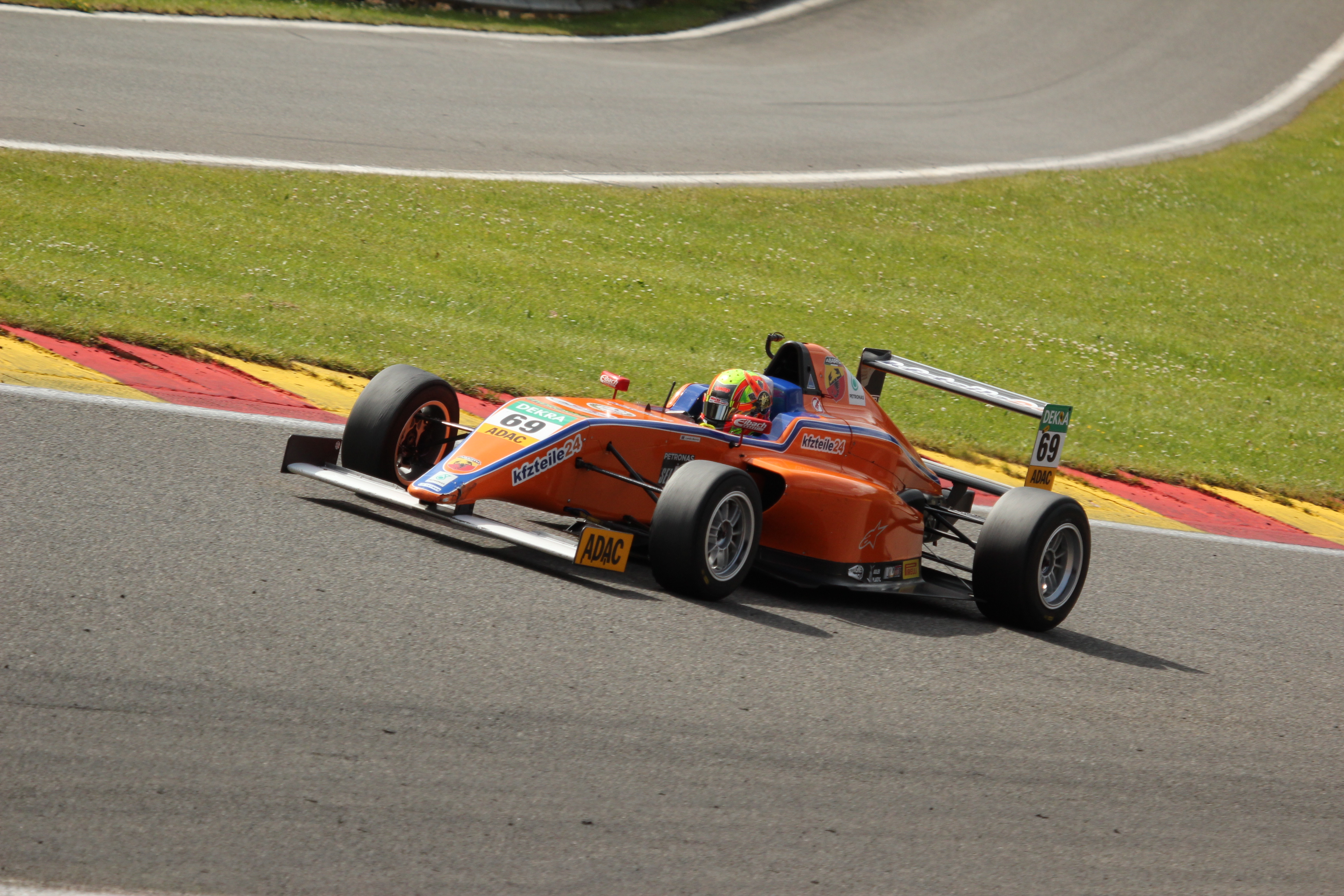
Norris racing for Mücke Motorsport in Formula 4 in 2015

=== Formula 4 (2015) ===
For 2015, Norris signed with Carlin Motorsport to drive in the newly established MSA Formula Championship (now known as the F4 British Championship). Norris took eight wins, ten pole positions, and fourteen total podiums to win the championship ahead of Ricky Collard and Colton Herta. He also made occasional appearances in the ADAC and Italian Formula 4 championships with Mücke Motorsport where he claimed six podiums from eight starts in the former.

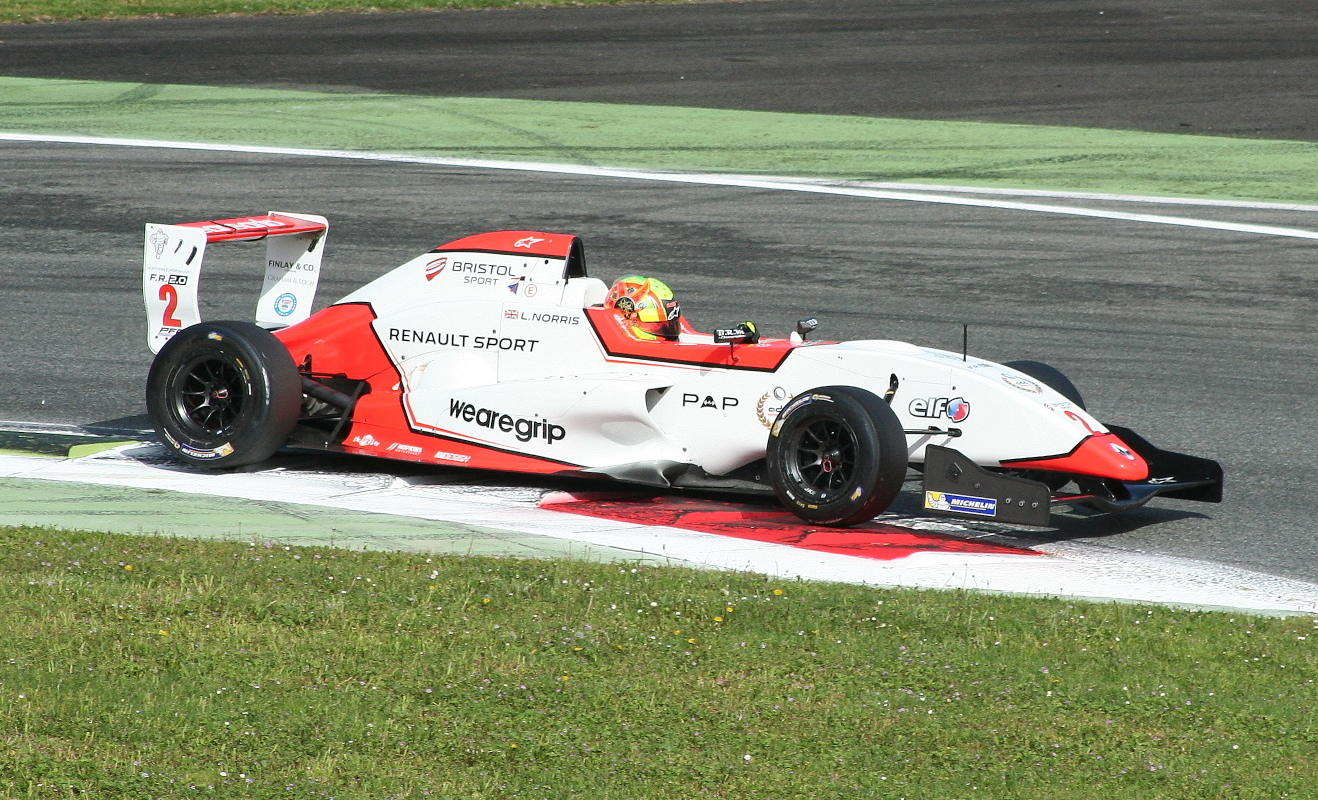
Norris racing at Monza during the 2016 Eurocup Formula Renault 2.0 championship

=== Formula Three / Formula Renault 2.0 (2016–2017) ===
In January 2016, Norris travelled to New Zealand to compete in the Toyota Racing Series with the M2 Competition team. He achieved six race wins, including the New Zealand Grand Prix, and won the championship ahead of Jehan Daruvala. Norris then returned to Europe to race in the Formula Renault 2.0 category with Josef Kaufmann Racing, competing in both the Eurocup and Northern European Cup. He won both series, taking eleven race wins in total and recording ten consecutive pole positions in the latter. At the same time, Norris embarked on a part-time campaign in the BRDC British Formula 3 Championship and claimed four wins in eleven races. In October, he made a guest appearance in the final round of the European Formula 3 Championship at the Hockenheimring in preparation for the Macau Grand Prix in November. Norris placed ninth in qualifying in Macau but was eliminated from the qualification race after crashing on the first lap. In the main race, he progressed from 27th on the grid to finish 11th.

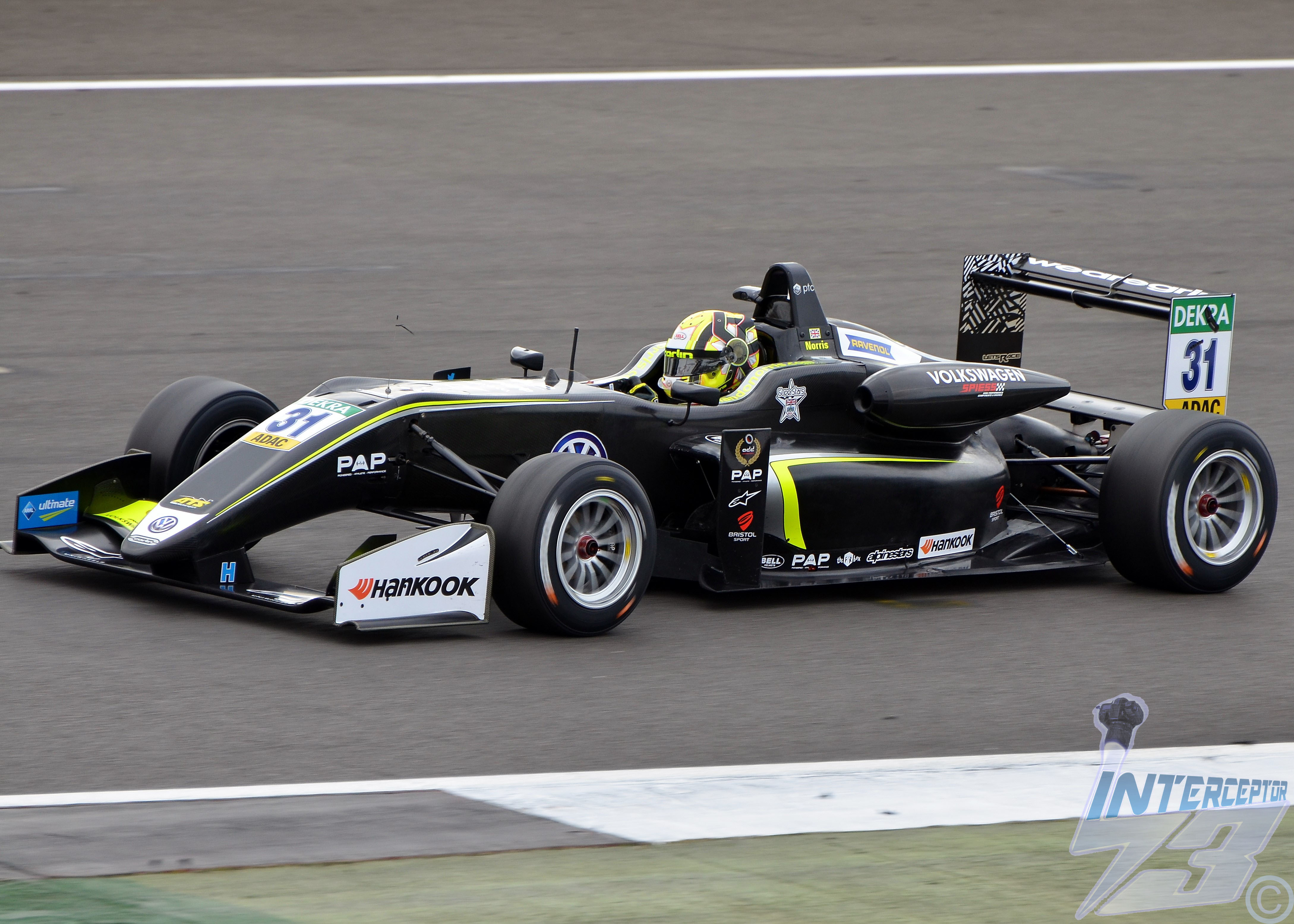
Norris at Silverstone during the 2017 Formula 3 European Championship

Norris raced full-time with Carlin in the 2017 European Formula 3 Championship, and faced competition from Joel Eriksson, Maximilian Günther and Callum Ilott for the championship title. Norris finished on the podium in twenty of the thirty races, including nine wins, and recorded eight pole positions. He clinched the title with two races remaining, marking his fifth racing championship title in four years. In November, Norris made his second appearance at the Macau Grand Prix. He was classified second in qualifying but dropped to seventh in the qualification race. He benefited from an accident between the leaders on the final lap to finish the Grand Prix second behind Dan Ticktum.

=== FIA Formula 2 (2017–2018) ===
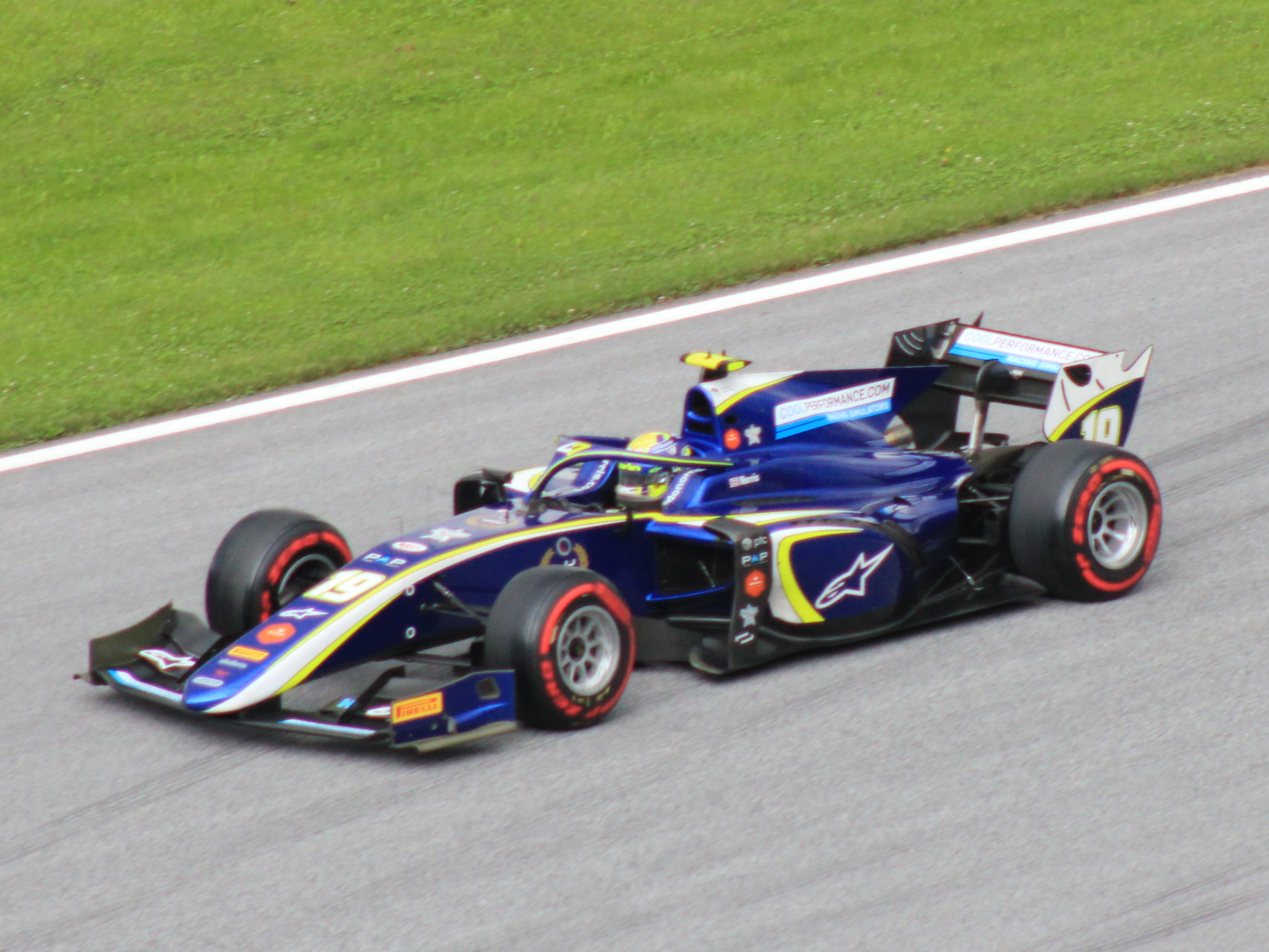
Norris driving for Carlin Motorsport during the 2018 FIA Formula 2 Championship

==== 2017: Debut ====
The weekend following the Macau Grand Prix, Norris made his FIA Formula 2 debut with Campos Racing, replacing Ralph Boschung for the final round of the 2017 season at the Yas Marina Circuit. Prior to the season, Norris expressed that "[Charles Leclerc] has done it [in 2017] so if I want to beat or prove I'm just as a good [sic] then I'm going to have to win [the title as a rookie]", adding that he did not think there was "any point in going for second or third".

==== 2018: Runner-up to Russell ====
Norris competed full-time in the 2018 FIA Formula 2 Championship, racing alongside Sérgio Sette Câmara at Carlin. Norris won the opening race at the Bahrain International Circuit from pole position, however, this would prove to be his only race victory of the season. He scored consistent points and podium finishes to hold the lead of the championship until the sixth round at the Red Bull Ring, when George Russell passed him in the standings. Norris retired from both races at the eleventh round at Sochi Autodrom, ruling him out of championship contention and dropping him to third place in the standings behind Alex Albon, although he recovered to second place after the final round in Abu Dhabi.

== Formula One career ==
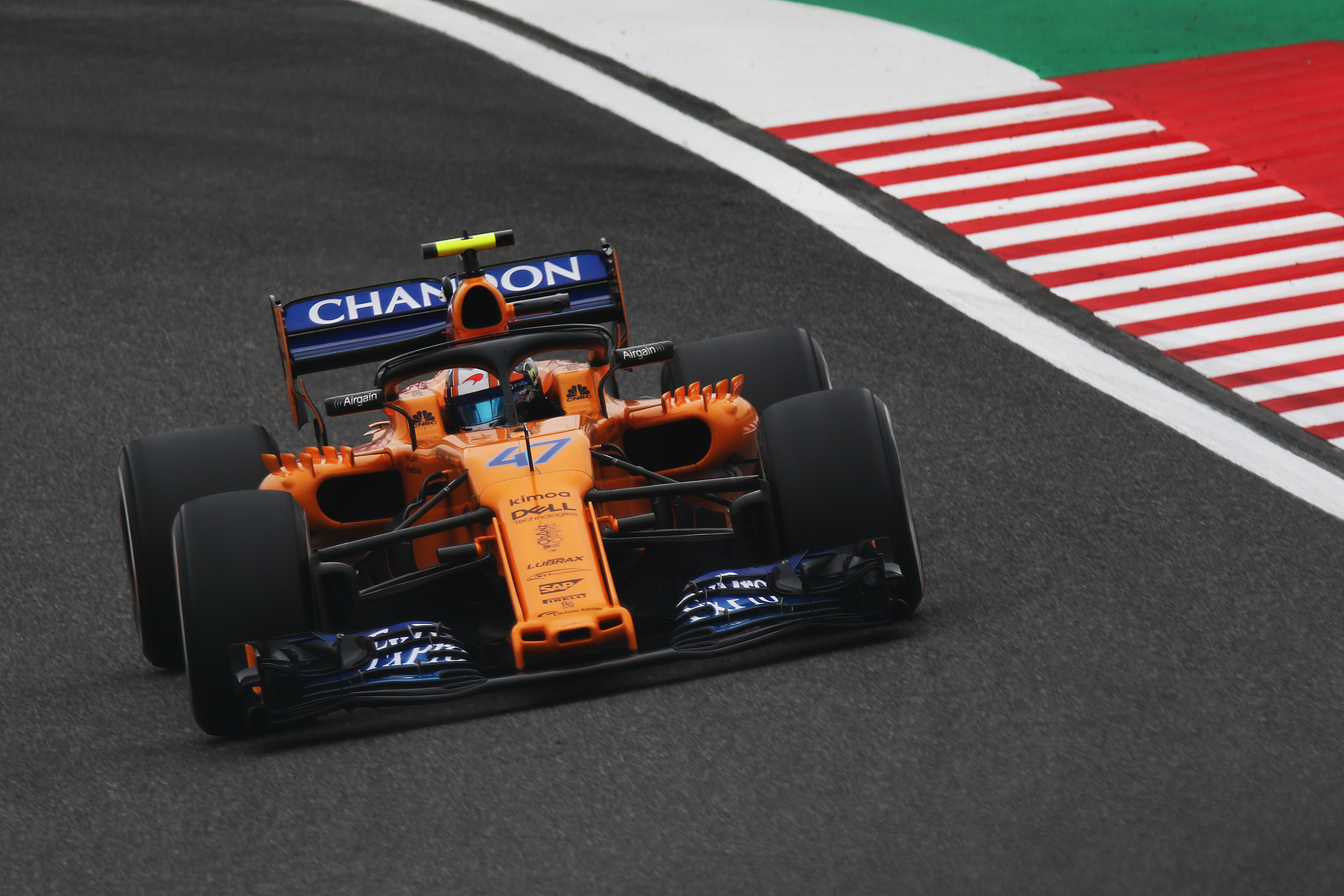
Norris testing for McLaren during free practice at the 2018 Japanese Grand Prix

In February 2017, Norris joined the McLaren Driver Development Programme. Following the announcement, Zak Brown said that Norris was "a fabulous prospect" who deserved the award. Later that year, Norris tested for McLaren in a scheduled mid-season test. He set the second fastest lap in the second day of testing at the Hungaroring. In late 2017, Norris became the official McLaren test and reserve driver for the 2018 season. Norris participated in his first official practice session at the Belgian Grand Prix, recording 26 laps. Norris drove in six further practice sessions during the year.

=== McLaren (2019–present) ===
==== 2019: Rookie season ====
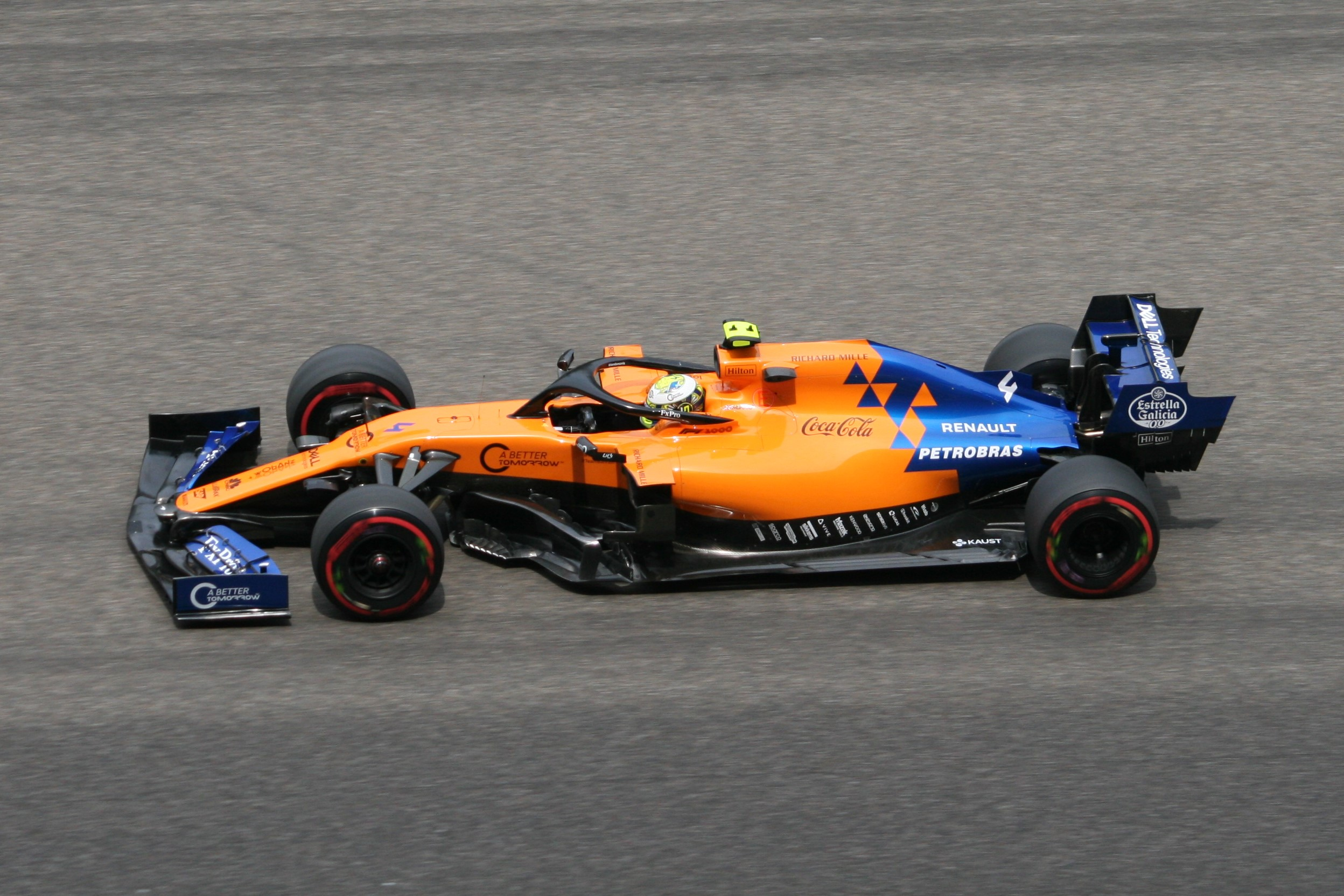
Norris (pictured at the Chinese Grand Prix) debuted in Formula One with McLaren in 2019, aged 19.

Norris signed for McLaren for the 2019 Formula One World Championship, partnering Carlos Sainz Jr. He qualified eighth on his debut at the Australian Grand Prix and finished the race in twelfth place. He scored his first Formula One points by finishing sixth at the following race, the Bahrain Grand Prix. The Chinese Grand Prix was the first of Norris's retirements that season, after damage from a first lap collision with Daniil Kvyat caused him to retire later in the race. Further retirements came at the Spanish Grand Prix after a collision with Lance Stroll and at the Canadian Grand Prix when a brake fire caused his suspension to fail.

Norris was on course to finish seventh at the French Grand Prix but suffered hydraulic problems late in the race and was eventually classified ninth. This was followed by a sixth-place finish at the Austrian Grand Prix, matching his best result. He was forced to start from the back at the German Grand Prix due to penalties for exceeding the allowed number of engine components for the season. He later retired from the race after a power failure. At the Belgian Grand Prix, he made his way from eleventh up to fifth in the early stages of the race. He maintained this position and was set to record his best career finish but suffered a power failure on his final lap and was classified eleventh.

Three consecutive points finishes followed at the Italian, Singapore and Russian Grands Prix. At the Japanese Grand Prix, Norris was running in fifth place before Alex Albon collided with him during an overtake attempt. Norris dropped back after collecting floor damage and eventually finished eleventh. At the next race, the Mexican Grand Prix, he had a wheel fitted incorrectly after pitting from seventh place. He spent almost two minutes in the pits as his mechanics resolved the problem but he was eventually withdrawn from the race. He ended the season with three consecutive points finishes.

Norris finished his debut Formula One season eleventh in the drivers' championship with 49 points. Teammate Sainz scored 96 points, however Norris out-qualified Sainz at eleven of the twenty-one races. During his debut year, Norris signed a multi-year contract to stay with McLaren for the 2020 season until 2022.

==== 2020: Maiden podium ====
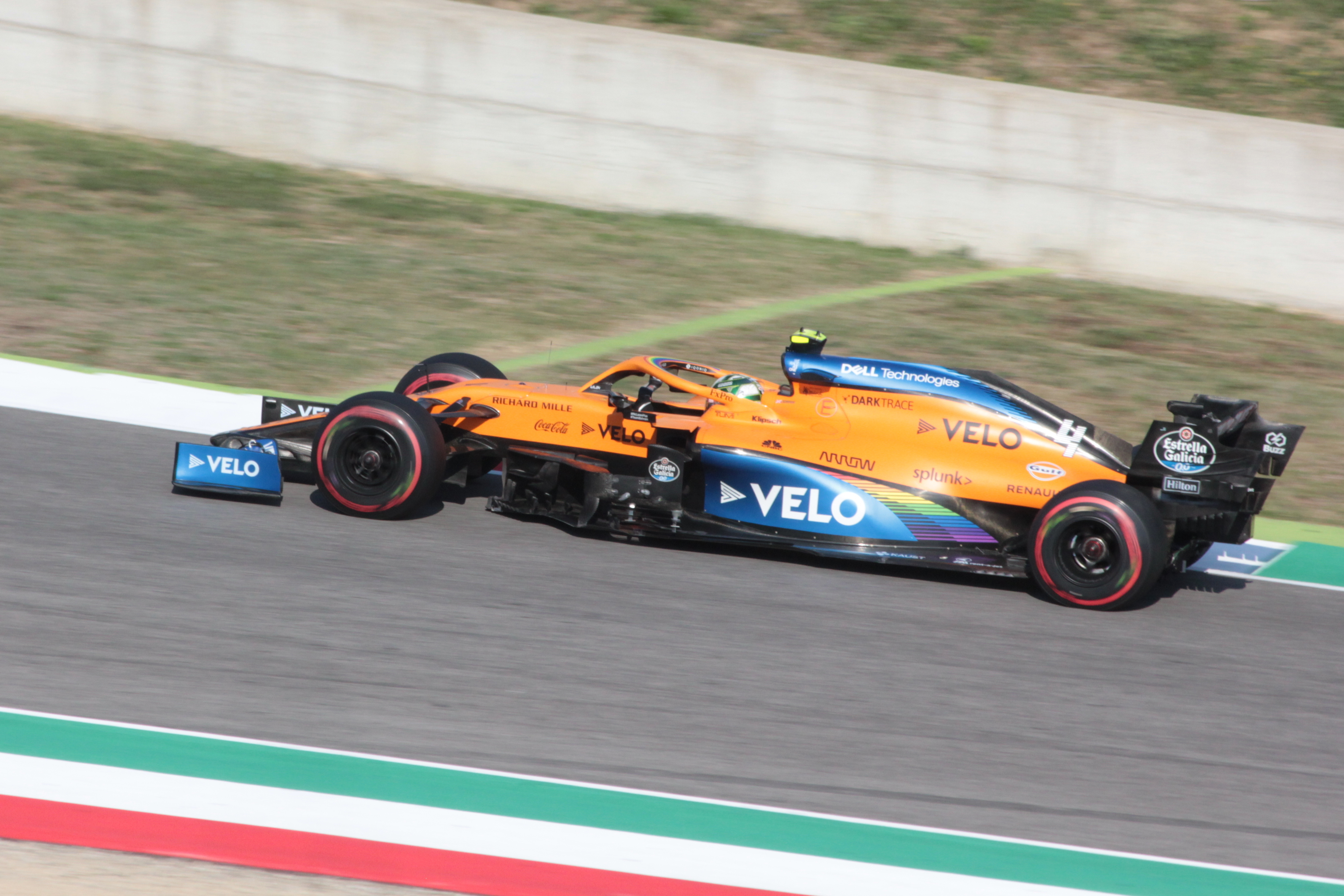
After scoring his first podium at the 2020 Austrian Grand Prix, Norris became the third-youngest podium finisher in Formula One history at the time.

At the season-opening Austrian Grand Prix, Norris qualified in fourth place but was elevated to third after a grid penalty for Lewis Hamilton, the highest grid position of his career at the time and the highest for McLaren since the 2016 Austrian Grand Prix. In the closing stages of the race, third-placed Hamilton was issued a five-second penalty for causing a collision with Alex Albon. Norris set the fastest lap of the race on the final lap to finish 4.802 seconds behind Hamilton, allowing Norris to claim the first podium finish of his career. This made Norris the third youngest podium-finisher in Formula One history at the time. At the Styrian Grand Prix, Norris qualified sixth but was given a three-place grid penalty for overtaking under yellow flags during practice. He overtook three cars in the final two laps of the race to finish fifth, in what he described as "one of the best races of [his] career".

Six consecutive points finishes came between the British and Tuscan Grands Prix. Norris collected damage on the opening lap of the Russian Grand Prix and finished the race fifteenth. At the Eifel Grand Prix, he retired from sixth place with power unit failure. During the Portuguese Grand Prix, a collision with Lance Stroll and a puncture resulted in a thirteenth-place finish. Following this, Norris faced criticism over his remarks that Stroll "doesn't seem to learn" and his perceived downplaying of Lewis Hamilton's achievement of most Grand Prix wins, describing it as meaning "nothing to him". Subsequently, Norris apologised for his comments about Stroll and also offered a personal apology to Hamilton, stating that his comments were "careless" and that he "[hadn't] shown the respect I should have to certain people".

At the Turkish Grand Prix, Norris had what he called "the worst start of everyone's career ever". He started from fourteenth place after a five-place grid penalty for failing to respect yellow flags in qualifying, but recovered to finish eighth and recorded the fastest lap of the race. Norris finished fourth at the Bahrain Grand Prix and fifth at the season-finale Abu Dhabi Grand Prix, which alongside the points scored by teammate Sainz, assisted McLaren in claiming third place in the Constructors' Championship over Racing Point. Norris ended the season ninth in the Drivers' Championship with 97 points, eight points behind Sainz.

==== 2021: Maiden pole position ====
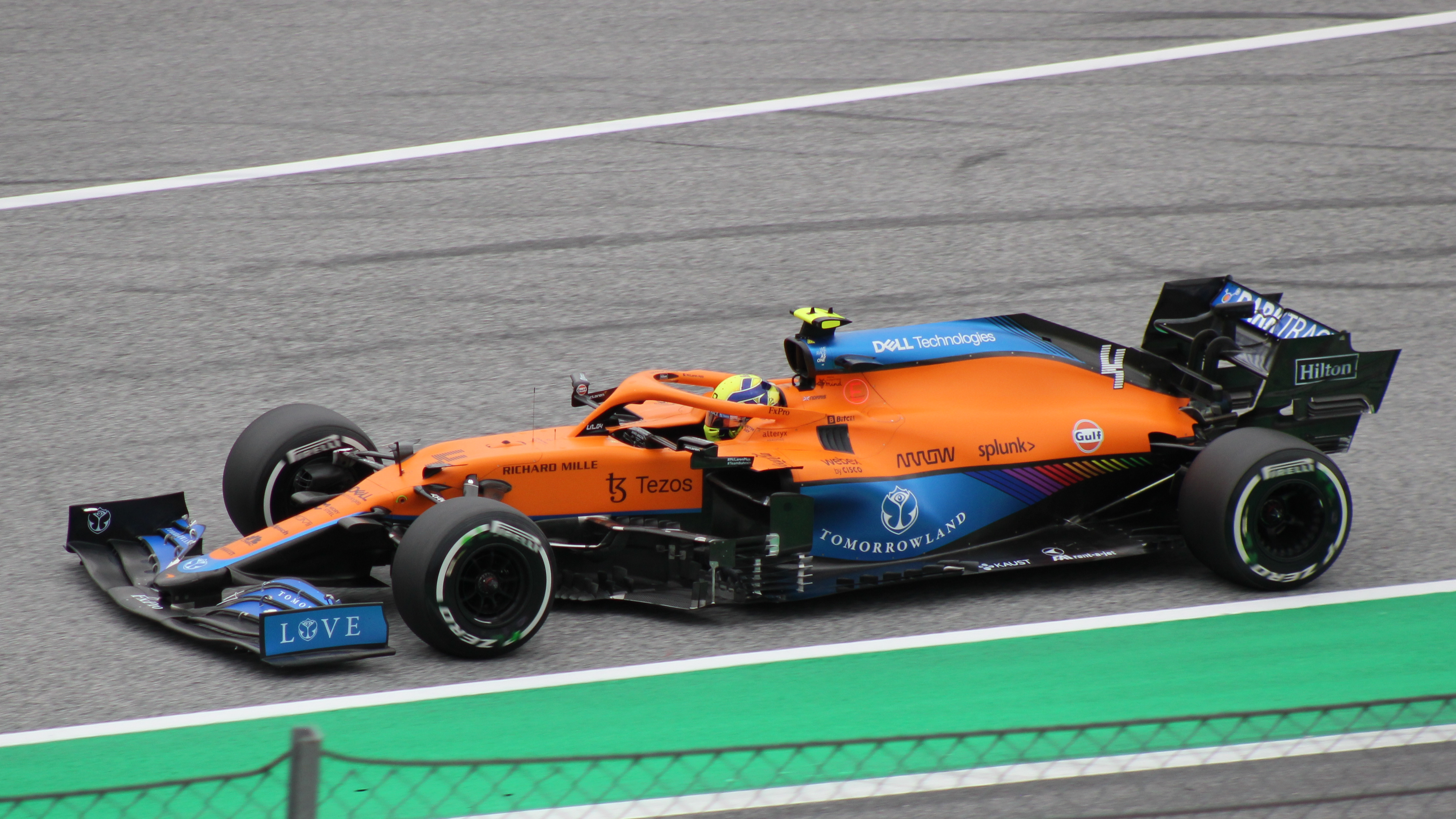
Norris at the 2021 Austrian Grand Prix

Norris remained at McLaren for the 2021 season, partnering Daniel Ricciardo as Sainz left the team for Ferrari. Norris qualified seventh for the season-opening Bahrain Grand Prix and finished the race fourth. At the following race, the Emilia Romagna Grand Prix, a qualifying time that would have placed him third on the grid was deleted for exceeding track limits, and he started the race seventh. Norris had run in second place before being overtaken by Lewis Hamilton with three laps remaining. He finished third to claim his second Formula One podium finish. At the Monaco Grand Prix, Norris started fifth and benefited from Charles Leclerc's failure to start the race and Valtteri Bottas' retirement to claim another podium finish. Norris was issued a grid penalty and started ninth at the Azerbaijan Grand Prix for failing to enter the pits during a red flag period in qualifying, a sanction he criticised as "unfair". He recovered places in the race to finish fifth, assisted by crashes and mistakes from drivers ahead.

Norris equalled his then-highest grid position at the Styrian Grand Prix in Austria, starting third after Bottas was issued with a grid penalty. He finished fifth for the third consecutive race. He bettered this qualifying position at the following weekend's Austrian Grand Prix, starting in second place after setting a time 0.048 seconds behind pole-sitter Max Verstappen. Norris received a penalty during the race after being judged to have forced Sergio Pérez off the track. He finished the race third to claim his third podium of the season. He set the sixth fastest time in Friday qualifying at the British Grand Prix, before finishing fifth in the new-format sprint qualifying and fourth in the Grand Prix. This result moved him up to third place in the drivers' championship. He qualified sixth for the Hungarian Grand Prix. He improved to third place by the first corner but was hit from behind by Bottas, causing him to collide with Verstappen. Norris retired from the race two laps later due to heavy damage. At the Italian Grand Prix, Norris finished fourth in sprint qualifying, which became third on the grid for the race as Bottas incurred an engine penalty. Norris finished the race second behind teammate Ricciardo, scoring his fourth podium of the season and securing McLaren's first one-two finish since the 2010 Canadian Grand Prix.

Norris took his first Formula One pole position in changing weather conditions in qualifying at the Russian Grand Prix. He lost the lead to Carlos Sainz on the first lap before regaining it on lap 13. Norris continued to lead the race with Lewis Hamilton close behind until rain began to fall in the closing laps. Norris decided to stay out on dry-weather tyres while Hamilton pitted for intermediate tyres. The rain soon worsened, allowing Hamilton to overtake and forcing Norris to pit for intermediates. Norris finished seventh, recording the fastest lap of the race. Norris scored points in each of the remaining seven races of the season, but did not finish higher than seventh. He qualified third at the season-ending Abu Dhabi Grand Prix and was the first of the five cars controversially permitted to unlap themselves on the penultimate lap of the race. He criticised the decision to resume the race on the final lap and described it as being done "for the TV". The result of the final race dropped Norris to sixth in the World Drivers' Championship, 4.5 points behind former teammate Sainz. Nevertheless, Norris achieved his career best result in the standings and scored 160 points to teammate Ricciardo's 115.

==== 2022 ====
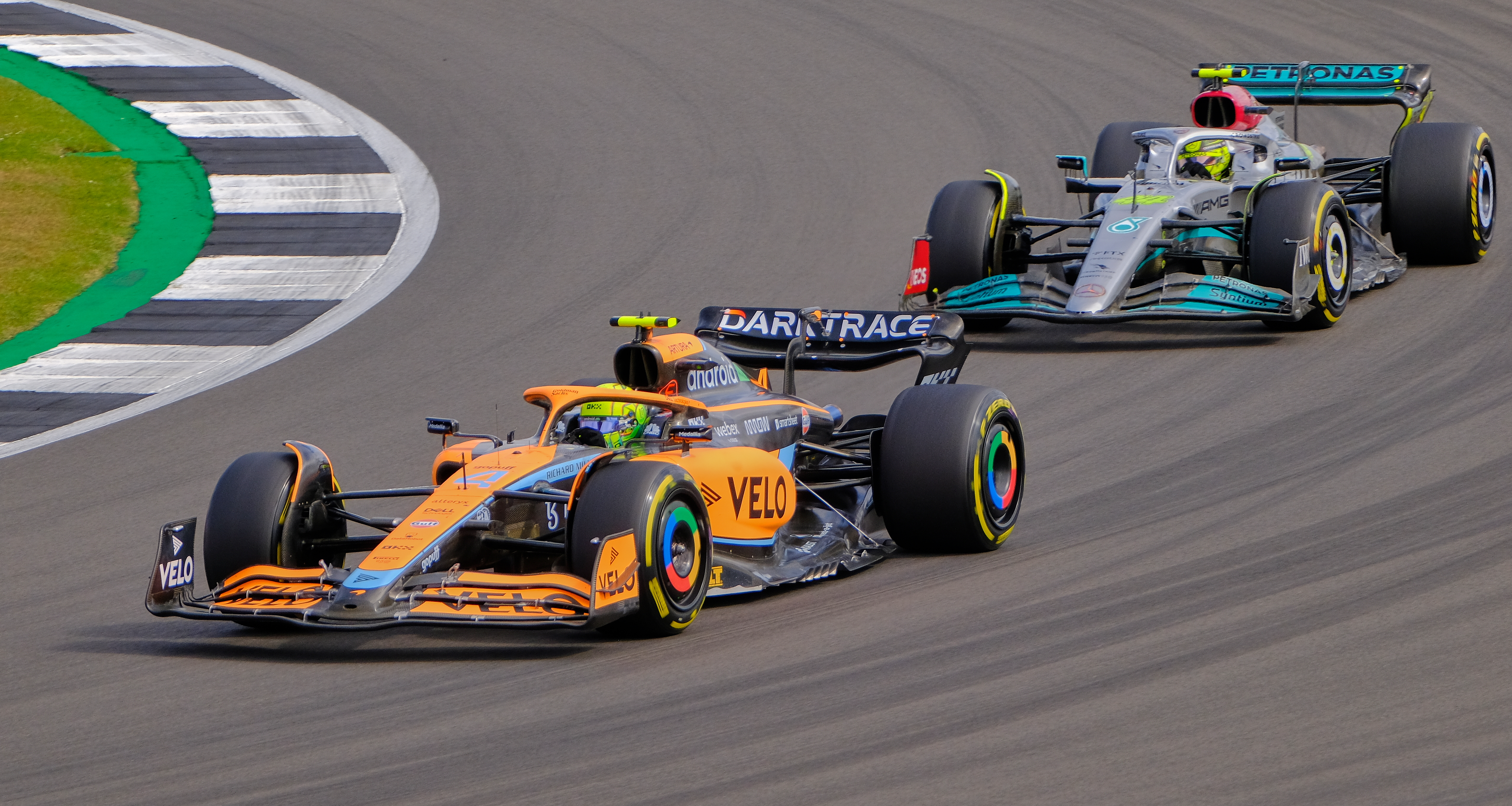
Norris (left) racing Lewis Hamilton (right) at the 2022 British Grand Prix

In February 2022, Norris extended his contract with McLaren to 2025. He completed all three days of pre-season testing in Bahrain after teammate Ricciardo tested positive for COVID-19 and was unable to attend.

Both McLaren drivers qualified and finished outside the top ten at the season-opening Bahrain Grand Prix. Norris then scored points at the Saudi Arabian and Australian Grands Prix before achieving the team's only podium finish of the season with third place at the Emilia Romagna Grand Prix. At the new Miami Grand Prix, the safety car was deployed when Norris was involved in a crash with Pierre Gasly's AlphaTauri. Despite suffering with tonsillitis, Norris came sixth in the Monaco Grand Prix and secured the fastest lap. He qualified fifteenth at the Austrian Grand Prix but recovered in the sprint and the race to finish seventh. He then qualified fourth for the Hungarian Grand Prix but was unable to keep Lewis Hamilton and the two Red Bulls behind and finished seventh.

Norris started seventeenth at the Belgian Grand Prix with a power unit components penalty and failed to score points, finishing twelfth. He started third at the Italian Grand Prix but again lost out to the Red Bulls and finished seventh. His best result since Emilia Romagna came at the Singapore Grand Prix where he and Ricciardo finished fourth and fifth respectively, briefly promoting McLaren to fourth place above Alpine in the Constructors' Championship. He scored points in the São Paulo Grand Prix sprint, but a gearbox failure eliminated him from the points positions in the race. He ended the season with sixth place and the fastest lap at the Abu Dhabi Grand Prix. He finished seventh in the Drivers' Championship and scored 122 points to Ricciardo's 37.

Norris had to heavily limit playing golf, cycling and running because he suffered from severe back pain that affected his sleep due to the stiffness and bouncing of the ground-effect Formula One cars introduced in 2022.

==== 2023 ====
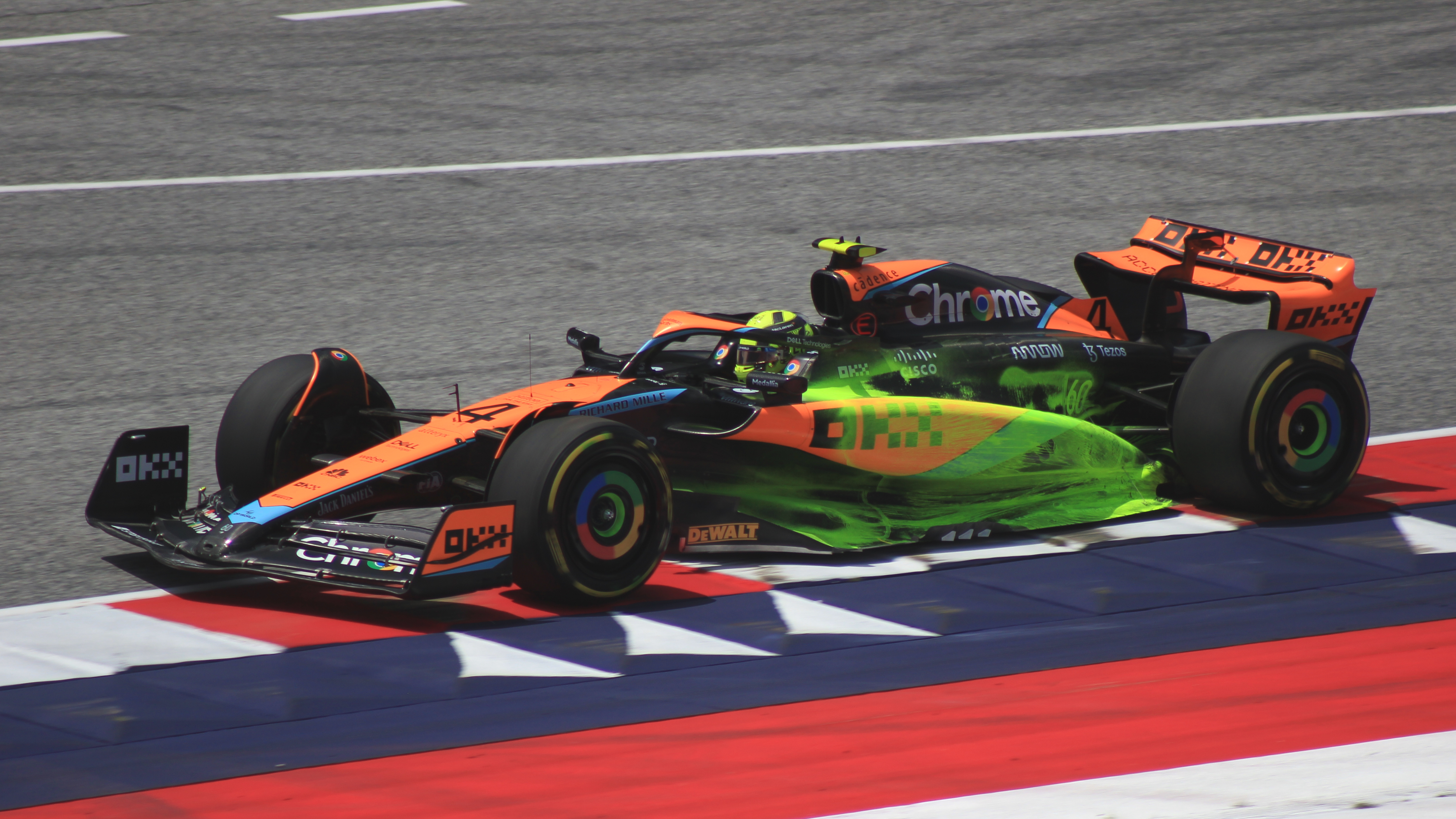
Norris at the 2023 Austrian Grand Prix

Norris remained with McLaren for 2023, partnered by rookie Oscar Piastri who replaced Ricciardo. At the first race at Bahrain, both McLaren cars experienced reliability issues. Norris made six pit stops to manage the problem and finished seventeenth and last of the finishing drivers. He was eliminated in the first qualifying session (Q1) for the first time since 2019 at the Saudi Arabian Grand Prix after hitting the wall. He received damage from debris on the opening lap and again finished seventeenth. The Australian Grand Prix saw McLaren score their first points of the season; Piastri finished eighth and Norris improved from thirteenth at the start to sixth at the finish. Another Q1 knockout at the Miami Grand Prix and contact with Nyck de Vries at the start resulted in another finish outside the points. He qualified third at the Spanish Grand Prix but first-lap contact with Lewis Hamilton dropped him to the back. He was demoted from a points finish at the Canadian Grand Prix with a penalty for "unsportsmanlike behaviour" after slowing excessively whilst entering the pit lane to create a gap to Piastri ahead.

McLaren brought upgrades to Norris's MCL60 for the Austrian Grand Prix; team principal Andrea Stella commented that "pretty much the entire car" had been redesigned. Norris qualified fourth for the race, third for the sprint and finished fourth in the race. More success came at the British Grand Prix where Norris and Piastri qualified second and third respectively, a result Norris described as "insane". He overtook Max Verstappen at the first corner and led the race for four laps before Verstappen regained the place. In the later stages of the race, Norris held off Lewis Hamilton to finish second, making him the first McLaren driver to finish on the podium at Silverstone Circuit since Hamilton in 2010. He then qualified third and defended from Sergio Pérez to finish second at the Hungarian Grand Prix, the first consecutive podiums of his Formula One career. He accidentally broke Verstappen's first place trophy – a handmade Herend worth around US$45,000 – during the podium celebrations; the trophy was later replaced. He started second at the Dutch Grand Prix but criticised his team's decision not to change tyres during a rain shower; he went on to finish seventh.

Four consecutive podiums began with the Singapore Grand Prix, where Norris held off the Mercedes duo of Hamilton and George Russell and finished less than a second behind race winner Carlos Sainz Jr., his former McLaren teammate. Sainz, who had Norris strategically hold up both Mercedes, praised Norris for allowing him to take the victory; his teammate Charles Leclerc had been passed by Hamilton and Russell, who had boxed for fresher mediums, and was thus unable to hold them up. He qualified third, behind teammate Piastri, at the Japanese Grand Prix, but overtook him in the race to finish second. He led much of the United States Grand Prix having qualified second and overtook Charles Leclerc at the start, but was ultimately overtaken by Verstappen and Hamilton. Hamilton's post-race disqualification promoted Norris to second place. Norris failed to set a competitive qualifying time at the Mexico City Grand Prix, starting seventeenth, but recovered to finish the race fifth. At the São Paulo Grand Prix, he claimed sprint race pole position but was overtaken by Verstappen at the first corner and finished second. He also finished second in the main race, having started sixth and gained four places at the start. His only retirement of the season came at the penultimate round, the Las Vegas Grand Prix. He qualified sixteenth and crashed heavily on the third lap. He was taken to hospital for precautionary checks and was discharged the same day.

Norris scored 205 points in total to Piastri's 97 and placed sixth in the Drivers' Championship, matching his result from 2021. He finished only one point behind fourth place, as Fernando Alonso and Charles Leclerc tied on 206 points.

==== 2024: Maiden win ====
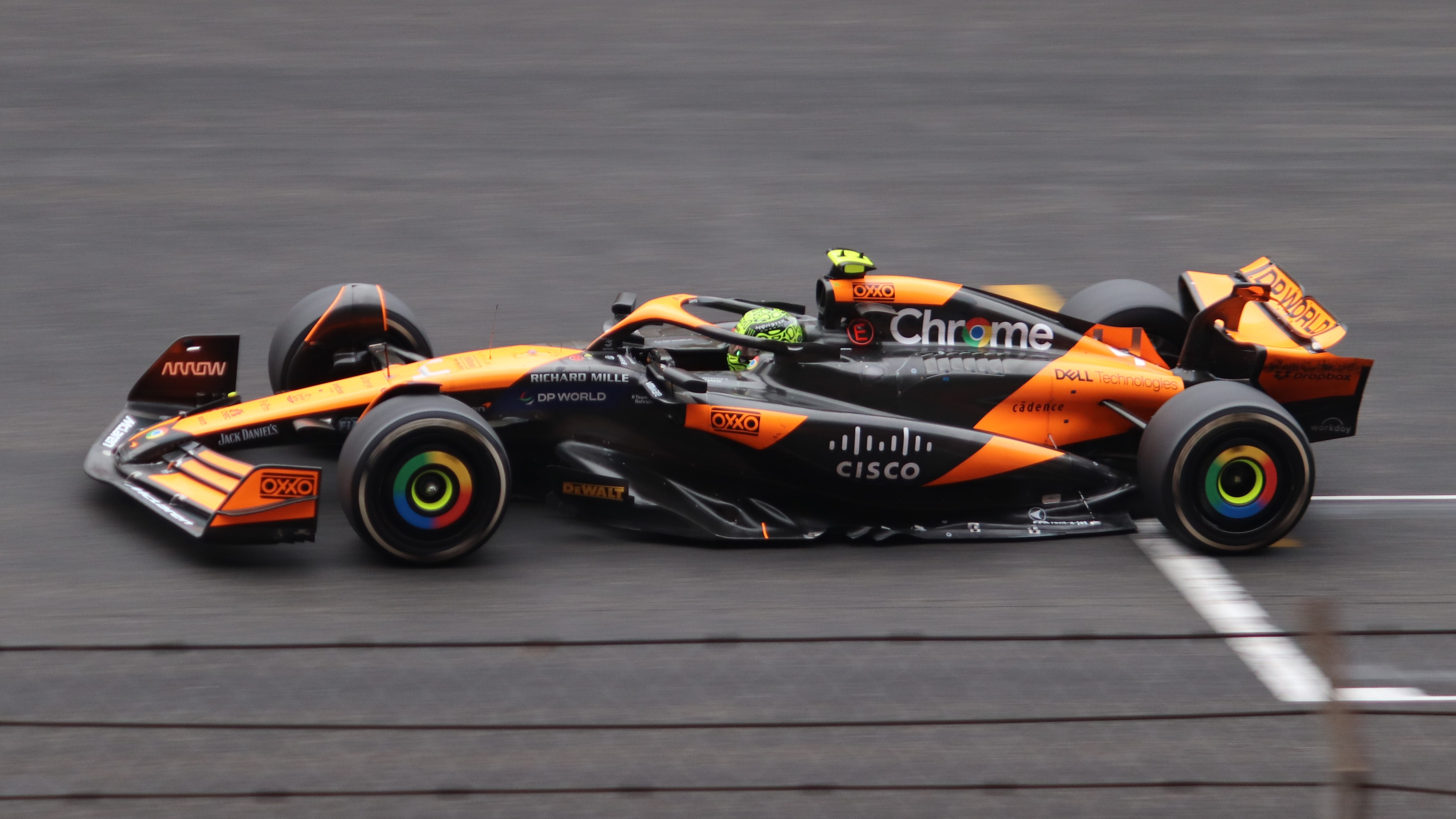
Norris at the 2024 Chinese Grand Prix

Ahead of the 2024 season, Norris signed a new multi-year contract with McLaren. He finished sixth at the first race, the Bahrain Grand Prix, and took his first podium of the season at the Australian Grand Prix, starting and finishing third. He took the season's first sprint pole at the Chinese Grand Prix, but dropped positions on the opening lap of the sprint and finished sixth. For the main race, he qualified fourth, overtook Fernando Alonso and gained on Sergio Pérez in the pits to finish second, his fifteenth Formula One podium. At the Miami Grand Prix, he retired from the sprint after a first-corner collision with Alonso. He qualified fifth for the main race and led the race after the drivers ahead had made pit stops. A subsequent safety car allowed Norris to pit and retain his lead, which he held ahead of Verstappen at the restart to claim his maiden Grand Prix victory after 110 races and his 16th podium finish, tying the record for the most podiums before taking a first win, a record he now shares with Patrick Depailler, Mika Häkkinen, Eddie Irvine and Jean Alesi.

After Miami, Norris achieved five podiums before the summer break. He scored podiums at Imola, where he was catching Verstappen but did not manage to pass him to win, Canada, where he briefly led the race but lost out to Verstappen through strategy, and Spain, where he took pole position but lost out at the start. Despite coming short of several opportunities, Norris stated he believed himself to be a championship rival to Verstappen after the uproar of his MCL38's overall performance. Norris failed to score a podium at Monaco, finishing fourth behind teammate Oscar Piastri, and in Austria, where he sparred with Verstappen before making race-ending contact with him. Norris achieved further podiums at the British Grand Prix, finishing in third following botched strategy, and Hungary, where he took pole position but lost out at turn one, giving his teammate Oscar Piastri the lead; after strategy controversially prioritised him first, McLaren invoked team orders on Norris, ordering him to slow down to give Piastri the lead and eventual race win. Norris finished in sixth at the Belgian Grand Prix, behind Verstappen, but was promoted to fifth following the disqualification of George Russell.

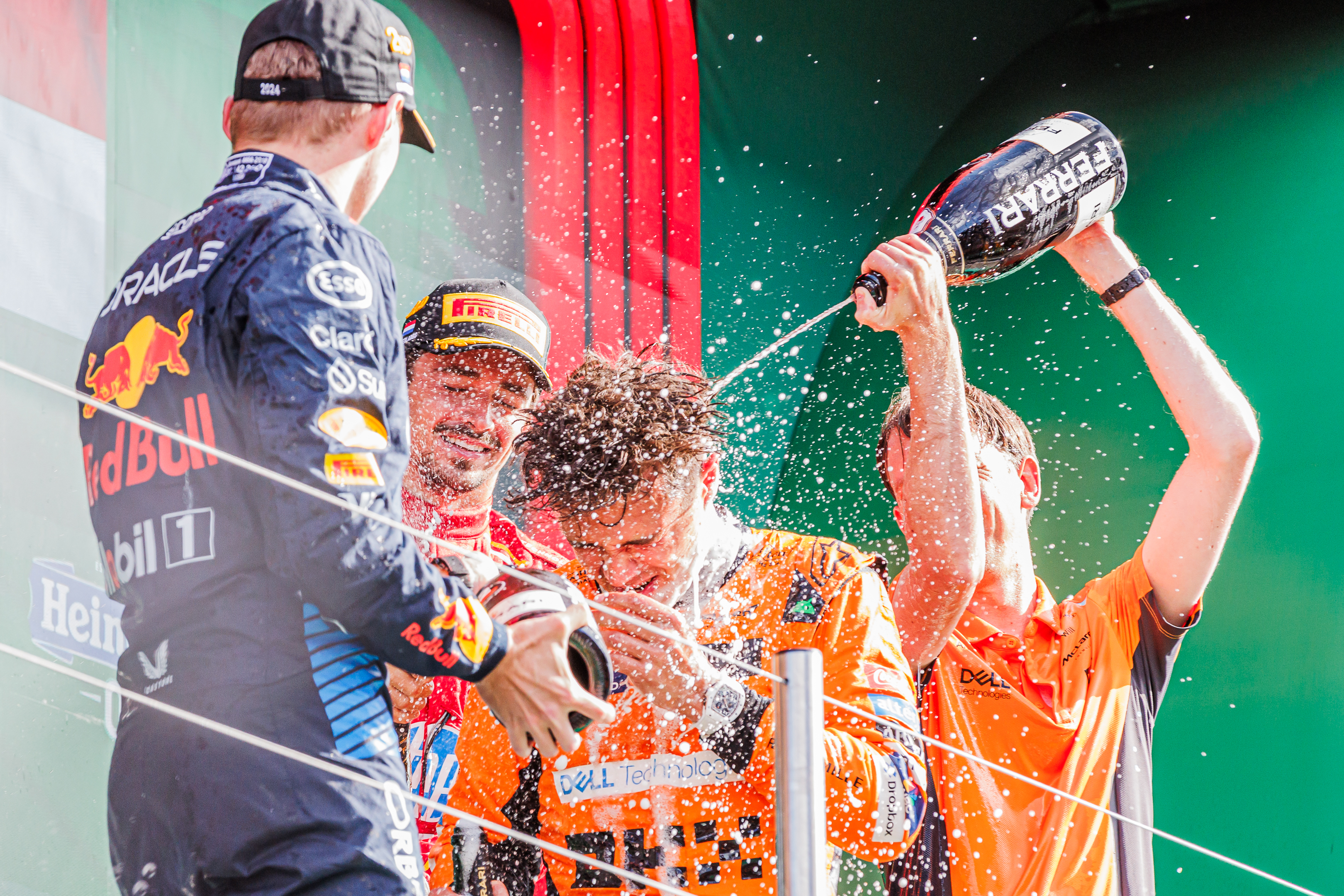
Norris (centre) on the podium after winning the 2024 Dutch Grand Prix

Following the summer break, Norris achieved pole position at the Dutch Grand Prix. During the race, he lost out to second-placed Verstappen at the start, but he eventually reclaimed first place through DRS. He kept the lead, which he extended to 22 seconds by the chequered flag, to take his second victory; McLaren's first at the Circuit Zandvoort since Niki Lauda's victory in 1985, and the first non-Red Bull or Max Verstappen victory at the venue since its return to the Formula One calendar in 2021. Norris then took pole position for the Italian race, marking the first consecutive pole positions of his career and becoming the first McLaren driver to achieve this feat since Lewis Hamilton in 2012. He started the race ahead of Piastri, marking McLaren's first front-row lockout at Monza since 2012. However, Norris lost out to his teammate, who overtook him at turn four, and would end up finishing in third behind Piastri and race winner Charles Leclerc, though he still achieved the fastest lap on lap 53. Norris suffered his and McLaren's first Q1 elimination since the 2023 Las Vegas Grand Prix during qualifying for the Azerbaijan Grand Prix. Norris aborted his lap after a brief yellow flag was shown at sector three; Esteban Ocon had brushed his car against the wall, damaging it. Norris, who was approaching sector three, was forced to lift due to this, forcing him to abandon the lap. Norris recovered to fourth after passing Verstappen, and the combined results of him and teammate, race winner Piastri, allowed McLaren to take the lead of the Constructors' Championship for the first time since 2014.

Norris took his fifth pole position of the season at the Singapore Grand Prix and set a new qualifying lap time record at the Marina Bay Street Circuit. A dominant display saw him claim his third win by a 20 second margin over Verstappen, and lead every lap to victory. At the United States Grand Prix, Norris qualified fourth for the sprint, and finished third. Norris took his sixth pole position for the main race but lost out while battling Verstappen, allowing both Ferraris to take the lead and eventual race win. Norris ended up battling with Verstappen for the final place of the podium, of which Norris was denied after a five-second penalty was awarded for overtaking Verstappen off-track, and Norris qualified in third for the Mexico City Grand Prix and finished second after capitalising on a mistake for Charles Leclerc.

After winning the São Paulo sprint from second after Piastri was instructed to swap positions, Norris claimed pole for the rain-affected Grand Prix; he was fined for violating the aborted start procedure and lost the lead to Russell. He dropped to sixth following an inopportune red flag and an error on the restart as Verstappen won from seventeenth, quelling his championship hopes. Ahead of the Las Vegas Grand Prix, Norris appeared to concede that any realistic hopes of taking the drivers' championship away from Verstappen had ended, though insisted his season had still been good. Norris also admitted that he had not prepared for a potential Drivers' Championship title bid at the beginning of the 2024 season. Norris qualified and finished the Las Vegas Grand Prix in sixth place whilst rival Verstappen finished fifth, mathematically ending Norris's title bid with two rounds remaining.

At the Qatar Grand Prix sprint, Norris led every lap from pole until he purposely slowed down approaching the finish line, handing the victory to Piastri as a return of favour for the São Paulo sprint. Nigel Chiu of Sky Sports compared the move to Michael Schumacher's at the 2002 United States Grand Prix. (Note: Schumacher, who had won the 2002 Austrian Grand Prix after swapping positions with teammate Rubens Barrichello, who had led a majority of the race, slowed down on the final lap of the 2002 United States Grand Prix to allow his teammate through for the win.) He received a ten-second stop-and-go penalty for speeding under yellow flags whilst running second in the race, ultimately finishing in tenth whilst Charles Leclerc of Ferrari who was now Norris's main challenger for the championship runner up spot in the drivers' championship finished the Grand Prix second behind champion Verstappen. Norris's error and strong Ferrari results in Qatar helped reduce McLaren's lead in the Constructors' Championship to second placed Ferrari to 21 points heading into the final round of the 2024 season at the Abu Dhabi Grand Prix, and reduced Norris's advantage over Charles Leclerc for second place in the drivers' championship to just eight points heading into the same event. In Abu Dhabi, Norris took pole and led from lights-to-flag in his fourth win of the season, which secured McLaren's first constructors' title since 1998.

==== 2025: Maiden title in battle vs. Verstappen and Piastri ====
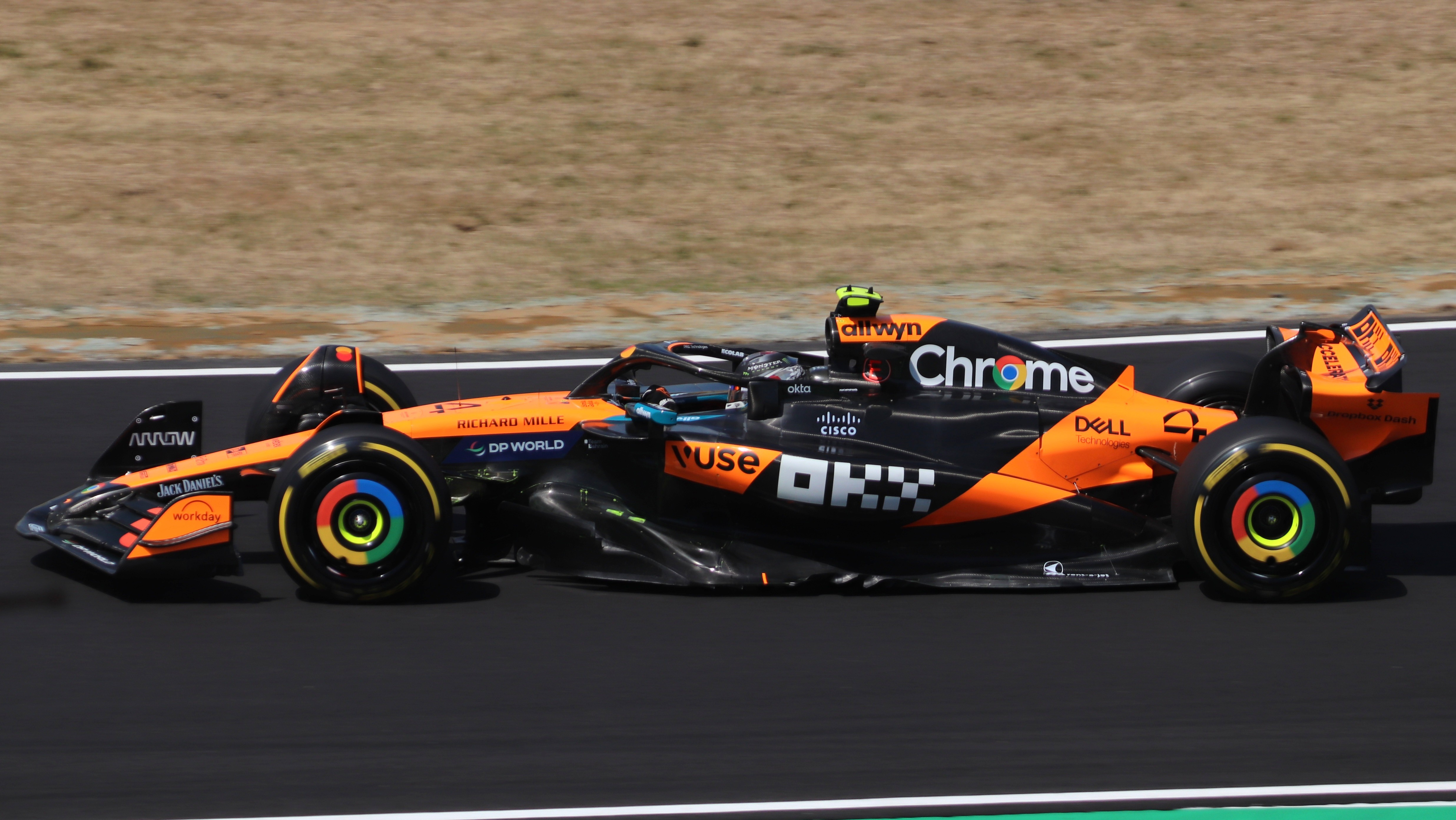
Norris (pictured at the Japanese Grand Prix) and McLaren entered 2025 as title favourites.

McLaren entered 2025 as title favourites, with Norris stating he had learned "a lot of lessons" in his bid to become World Drivers' Champion. He took pole for the season-opening Australian Grand Prix, defending the lead from teammate Oscar Piastri and Max Verstappen in wet conditions to claim victory and the championship lead. After finishing eighth in the Chinese Grand Prix sprint, he claimed second in the main race behind Piastri. In Japan, he finished second to Verstappen, who reduced his championship lead to a single point. Norris increased his championship lead to three points, now ahead of Piastri, with his third-placed finish at the Bahrain Grand Prix after qualifying sixth—claiming he felt "clueless" in the MCL39—and receiving a penalty for a start infringement. Norris crashed out of qualifying for the Saudi Arabian Grand Prix, recovering to fourth from tenth and dropping below Piastri in the standings. Benefitting from a late safety car to pass Piastri with a shortened pit stop, he won the Miami Grand Prix sprint; he finished second to Piastri in the main race after losing positions in a battle with polesitter Verstappen. He finished second in Emilia Romagna before winning the Monaco Grand Prix from pole, reducing Piastri's lead to three points. He then finished second to Piastri in Spain. A collision with Piastri in a battle for fourth at the Canadian Grand Prix saw Norris retire from the race, which he apologised and was penalised for; 22 points down, he stated "[he could not] afford to make some of the mistakes that [he had] been making" if he wanted to claim the title.

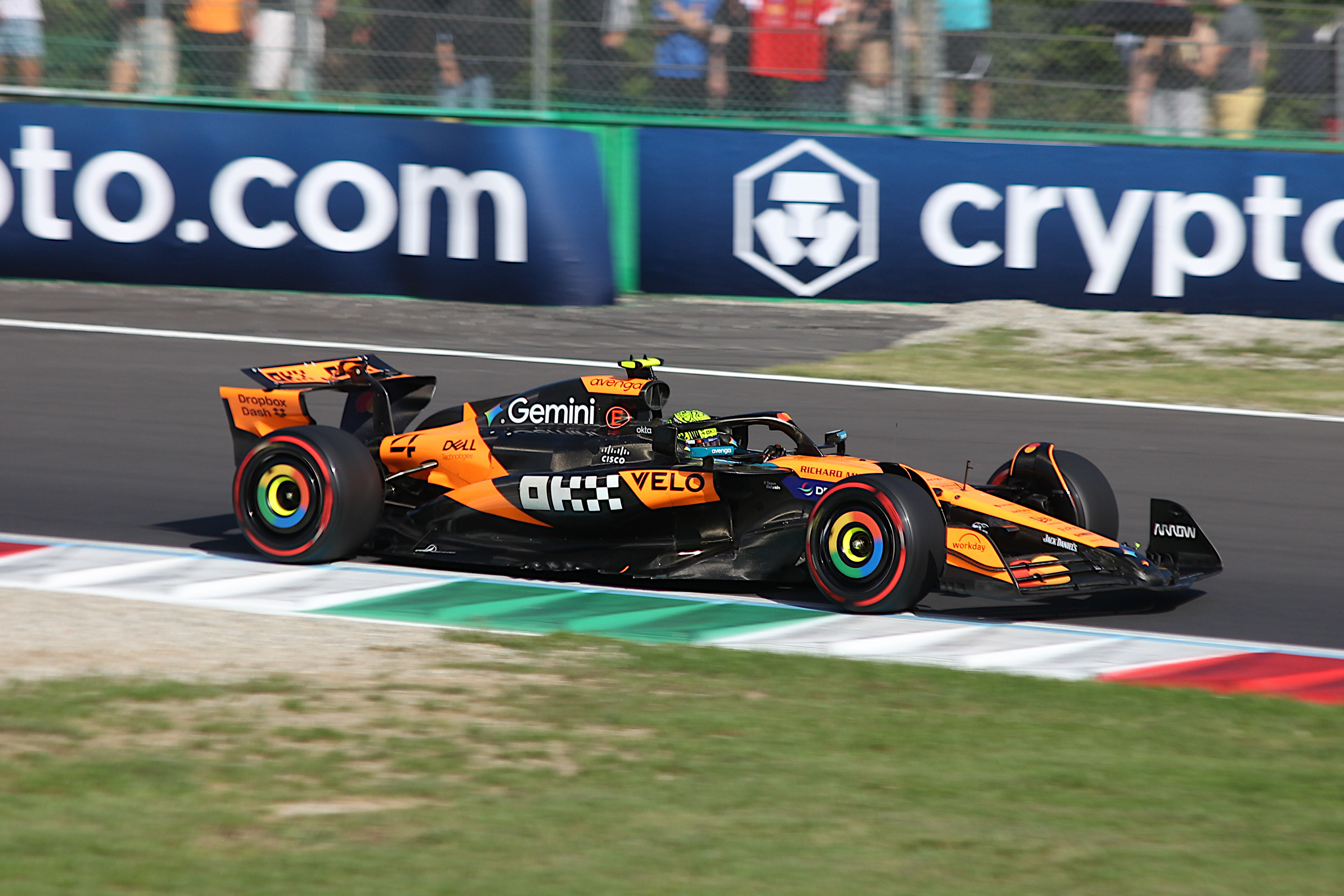
Norris at the Italian Grand Prix

Norris cruised to pole by over half a second in Austria, before holding off Piastri to win. He capitalised on a penalty for Piastri to win his first British Grand Prix. Third in the Belgium sprint, he took pole for the Grand Prix before making several errors as he finished second to Piastri. On an alternate one-stop strategy in Hungary, he claimed the lead from fourth and held off a late charge by Piastri to win and close his advantage to nine points. Norris retired from second in the closing laps of the Dutch Grand Prix after experiencing an oil leak, dropping 34 points behind Piastri. He battled for the lead with polesitter Verstappen in Italy before falling behind; a slow pit stop then dropped him behind Piastri, who was controversially ordered to cede the position and handed second back to Norris. After damaging his car in the second free practice session, Norris was unable to capitalise on mistakes made by Piastri in Azerbaijan, qualifying and finishing in seventh, enduring another slow stop during the race. Norris gained six points on Piastri. He then qualified fifth in Singapore, behind his title rival before colliding into Piastri while trying to overtake him on the first lap—a move which Piastri believed not "team-like" and "not fair". He finished the race in third, ahead of Piastri, as McLaren won the Constructors' Championship with six races to go. Norris trailed Piastri by 22 points following the race. After sharing a first-lap retirement with teammate Piastri in the United States sprint event, he qualified and finished in second for the main race, bringing the gap to Piastri down to 14 points. Norris retook the championship lead by one point at Mexico City after converting his pole position to a dominant win, and added eight further points to it by winning the São Paulo sprint from pole position. He then took pole position for the main race, with title rivals Piastri and Verstappen in fourth and sixteenth, respectively. Norris won the main race, with Verstappen finishing third, starting from the pit lane, and Piastri finishing fifth, getting a ten-second penalty.

On pole on his 150th race start, the Las Vegas Grand Prix, he lost the lead to Verstappen after making a mistake, and was disqualified from second behind Verstappen due to a plank wear infringement. The disqualifications of Norris and team mate Piastri for excessive plank wear meant Norris retained a 24 point lead in the drivers' championship over Piastri with two rounds remaining. Norris's disqualification saw his points margin over Verstappen more than halved (also 24 points). Piastri and Verstappen tied on drivers' championship points with each other as a consequence of the race result. Norris had an opportunity to win the title at the Qatar Grand Prix should he outscore Piastri and Verstappen by two points. Finishing third behind Piastri during the sprint, Norris finished in fourth in the main race, with Verstappen winning and Piastri in second to bring the championship to the final round of the season. In Abu Dhabi, Norris finished third, securing his first World Drivers' Championship. Norris also won the DHL Fastest Lap Award for the second year in succession. In the following year, McLaren gifted Norris his Championship-winning F1 car, the MCL39.

==== 2026: Title defence ====
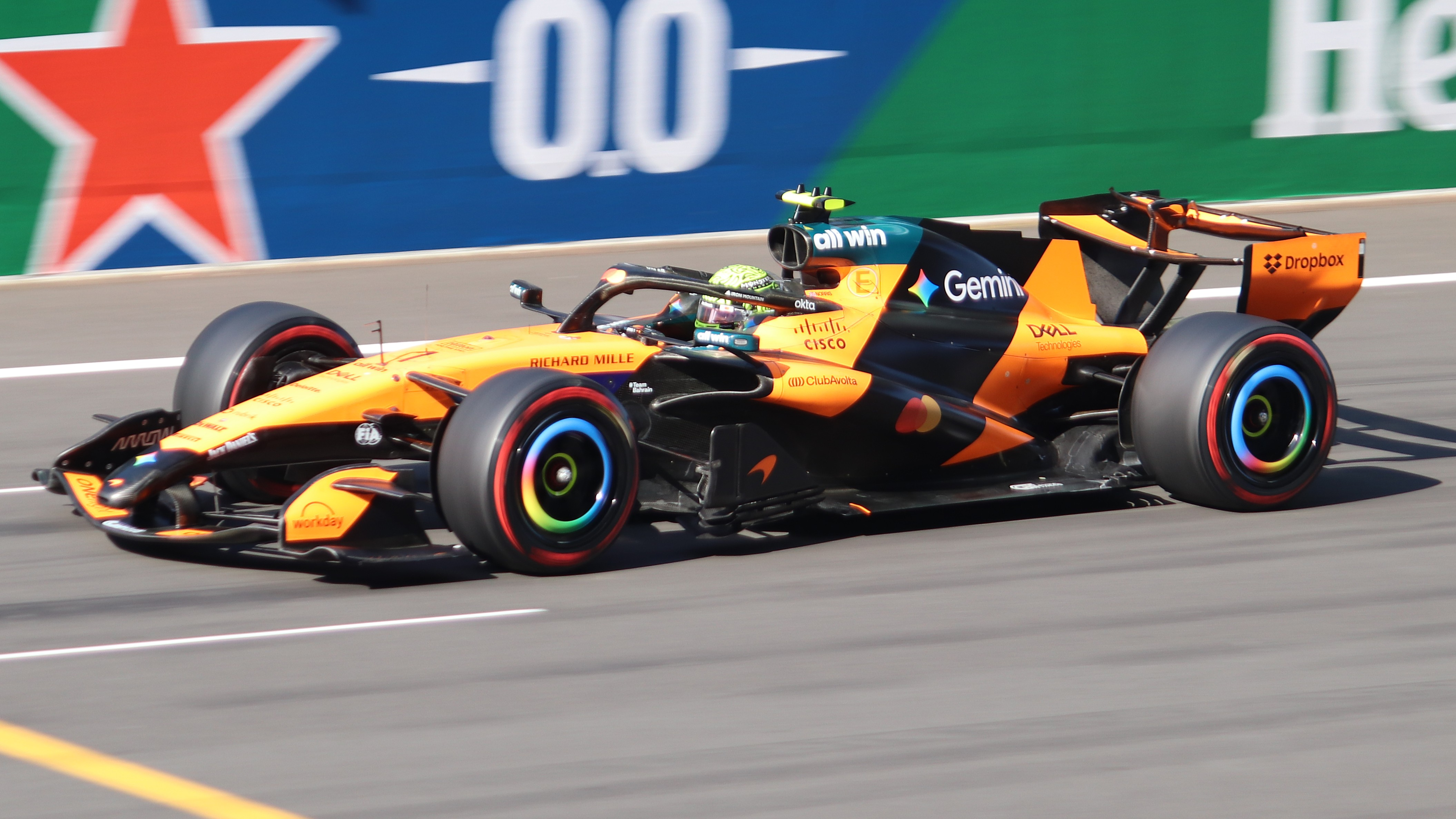
Norris (pictured at the Chinese Grand Prix) entered 2026 as the defending champion.

Norris remained at McLaren for 2026 with Piastri continuing as his team mate for a fourth season in a row. Norris exercised his right as the defending Drivers' Champion to run the number 1 on his car during the 2026 season. The beginning of his title defence was hampered by reliability issues, including a DNS at the Chinese Grand Prix (electrical) and back-to-back retirements at Canada (gearbox) and Monaco (battery). He achieved his first podium as champion in Miami alongside a Sprint race victory, and his second podium at the Barcelona-Catalunya Grand Prix. At the Hungarian Grand Prix Norris achieved his first Grand Prix victory as the defending champion. Norris returned to victory at the following Dutch Grand Prix after being overtaken by Kimi Antonelli on the restart. On 29 August, it was announced that Norris signed a contract extension with McLaren to stay with the team until the 2030 season. He finished fourth at the Italian Grand Prix, and returned to the podium with a third-place finish at the Spanish Grand Prix. In Baku, Norris qualified fifth, but did not finish the race due to a crash on the thirty-sixth lap involving Alpine drivers Franco Colapinto and Pierre Gasly.

== Other racing ==
=== Endurance racing ===
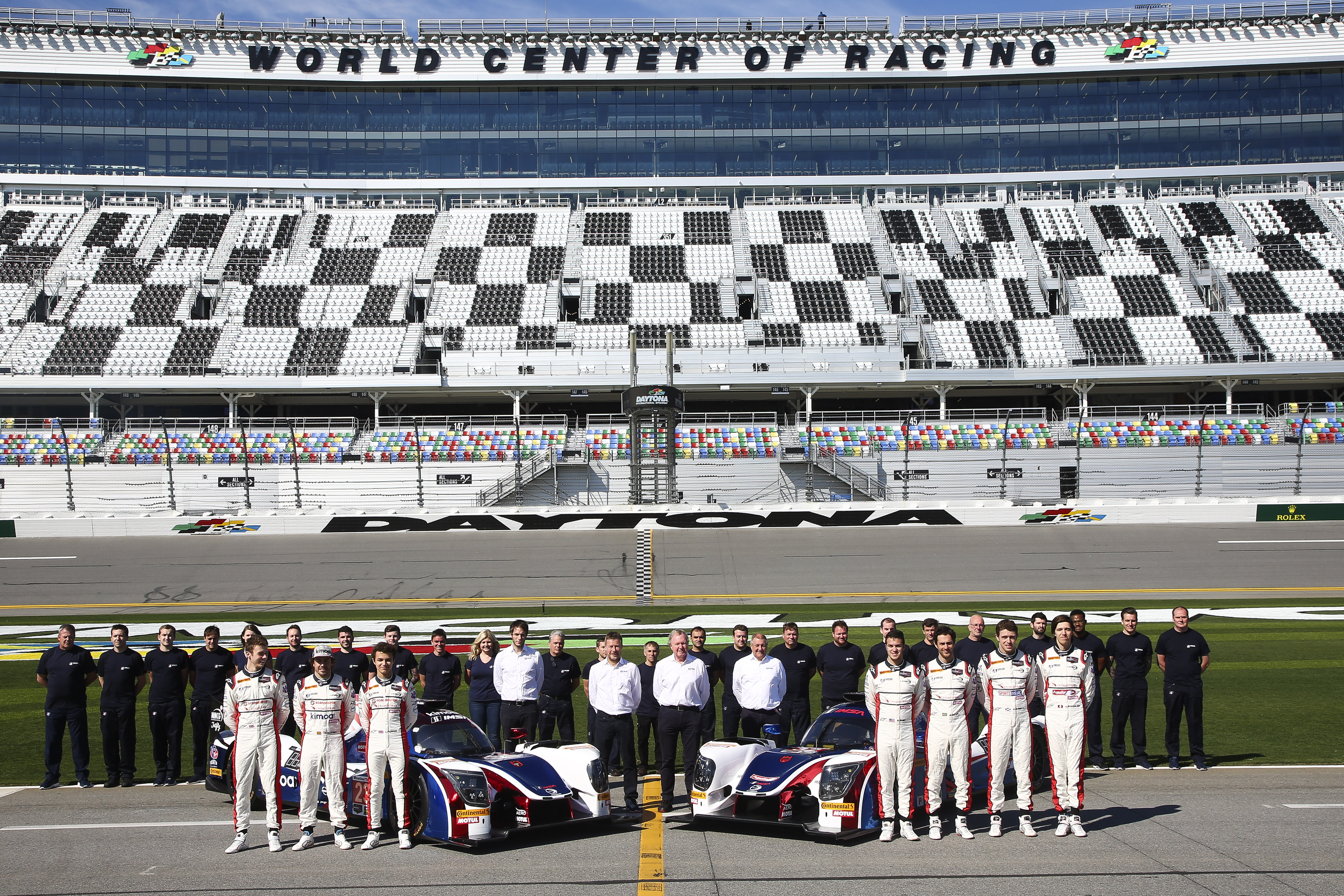
Norris (third from left) debuted in endurance racing at the 2018 24 Hours of Daytona, leading several laps.

Norris made his endurance racing debut in 2018, joining United Autosports for the 24 Hours of Daytona in the IMSA SportsCar Championship, alongside Fernando Alonso and Phil Hanson in the No. 23 Ligier JS P217. They finished thirteenth in the premier Prototype class and thirty-eighth overall, rising to sixth early in the race before encountering brake and throttle issues; following the race, Alonso hailed Norris's "impressive speed", further acclaiming his teamwork, preparation, and focus. Norris had brought the No. 23 to the lead in wet conditions prior to his first pit stop.

=== Sim racing ===
Norris competed in sim racing for Team Redline at multiple iRacing events in 2019; he debuted at the Bathurst 12 Special Event—a 12-hour virtual team endurance race—in February, alongside Max Verstappen. The pair won the Spa 24 Special Event in July. Norris entered two rounds of the 2020 IndyCar iRacing Challenge for Arrow McLaren, winning the fifth round at the Circuit of the Americas.

Norris competed in the 2020 24 Hours of Le Mans Virtual with Redline in the LMP2 class alongside Verstappen, as well as esports drivers Atze Kerkhof and Greger Huttu. After qualifying in fifth, the team were met with a series of technical problems, forcing their retirement overnight. A red flag was called, allowing the team to rejoin 18 laps down and finish 25th in-class.

== Other ventures ==
Since his debut season in Formula One in 2019, Norris appears in the Netflix documentary series Drive to Survive, with the show providing behind-the-scenes looks at the drivers, teams and the intense rivalries in the sport.

Norris founded the company Quadrant in 2020, a global motorsport lifestyle brand and platform, which also focuses on content creation, apparel and esports. Norris retains a minority stake in the venture after he ceded majority financial control of the venture to the Veloce Media Group in July 2025. Prior to attaining this majority share, the Veloce Media Group had already been serving as a business partner and collaborator in the Quadrant venture with Norris since its inception in 2020.

In 2021, Norris launched an eponymous kart racing brand known as LN Racing Kart. The manufacturing for the group is supported by the OTK Kart Group, while operations are carried out by Ricky Flynn Motorsport, who Norris won the Karting World Championship with in 2014. The chassis debuted in international competition in 2022, winning its maiden World Cup in the OK-N class two years later.

Norris sells his own merchandise, which features his LN4 logo and includes regular new apparel releases. Since 2024, he is a global brand ambassador for the suitcase brand Tumi and for the fragrance Polo Red by Ralph Lauren.

In 2025, Norris and Monster Energy launched his own Monster Energy Zero Sugar drink with the flavour yuzu melon. The can features the recognisable fluorescent-yellow pattern of Norris' helmet design which he first debuted in his 2024 Formula One season. A year later in 2026, Monster Energy released a limited-edition can that featured a metallic gold design inspired by and celebrating Norris' first world championship title in 2025.

In 2026, Norris co-founded the junior single-seater team LN4 Fusion. The group acquired selected assets of AIX Racing and is expected to compete in Formula 2, Formula 3, British F4, Italian F4, German F4 and the Formula Regional European Championship. Norris also launched the LN4 Legacy Programme, a driver development initiative aimed at helping young drivers financially on the way to Formula One that he personally funded.

In August 2026, Norris confirmed he would be subject of a documentary series for Amazon Prime Video. The series is expected to be released in early 2027 and will focus on Norris' 2026 racing season and personal life away from the track.

== Personal life ==
At the start of his Formula One career in 2019, Norris resided near the McLaren Technology Centre in Surrey, England—before moving to Monaco in early 2022. He was in a relationship with Portuguese model Luisinha Oliveira from August 2021 to September 2022. Norris dated Portuguese actress Margarida Corceiro from 2024 until early 2026.

Norris has advocated for mental health awareness by openly discussing his struggles with anxiety, self-doubt and high emotional pressure, especially during his first years competing in the sport. He has worked extensively with the charity Mind to advocate for mental health in partnership with McLaren. After winning the 2025 World Drivers' Championship, Norris said that working with a sport psychologist had positively contributed to his performances during the season.

Norris is an avid gamer and used to regularly livestream playing video games on his Twitch channel during his first years in Formula One.

Norris regularly plays golf, and cites the sport as his favourite form of escapism away from racing. He got into golf during the COVID lockdown and through his then McLaren teammate Carlos Sainz. Since then, Norris has contested in multiple celebrity pro–am events and was invited to play at Augusta National one day after winning his first Formula One race at the 2024 Miami Grand Prix. In 2022, Norris had to heavily limit playing golf because he suffered from severe back pain that affected his sleep due to the stiffness and bouncing of the ground-effect Formula One cars introduced in the same year.

== Awards and honours ==
=== Formula One ===
- Formula One World Drivers' Championship: 2025
- DHL Fastest Lap Award: 2024, 2025
- Hawthorn Memorial Trophy: 2024, 2025
- Lorenzo Bandini Trophy: 2023

=== Other awards ===
- Time 100: 2026
- Autosport Awards British Competition Driver of the Year: 2019, 2020, 2021, 2023, 2024, 2025
- Autosport Champion: 2026
- Autosport BRDC Award: 2016
- Autosport Awards National Driver of the Year: 2017
- Autosport Awards British Club Driver of the Year: 2016
- BBC Sports Personality of the Year third-place: 2025
- Best Driver ESPY Award: 2026
- Laureus World Sports Award for Breakthrough of the Year: 2026

== Karting record ==
=== Karting career summary ===
| Season | Series | Team | Position |
|---|---|---|---|
| 2008 | Super 1 National Championships — Comer Cadet | | 35th |
| 2009 | Formula Kart Stars — Cadet | | 21st |
| 2009 | Super 1 National Championships — Comer Cadet | | 14th |
| 2010 | Kartmasters British Grand Prix — Comer Cadet | | 27th |
| 2010 | Formula Kart Stars — Cadet | | 10th |
| 2010 | Super 1 National Championships — Comer Cadet | | 3rd |
| 2011 | Trent Valley Kart Club — Mini Max | | 27th |
| 2011 | Kartmasters British Grand Prix — Comer Cadet | | 25th |
| 2011 | Super 1 National Championships — Comer Cadet | | 5th |
| 2011 | MSA British Championship — Cadet | | 6th |
| 2012 | Kartmasters British Grand Prix — Mini Max | RL Racing Department | 4th |
| 2012 | Super 1 National Championships — Mini Max | | 2nd |
| 2012 | Formula Kart Stars — Mini Max | | 1st |
| 2012 | Formula Kart Stars — Junior Max | | 18th |
| 2012 | Rotax Max Euro Challenge — Junior Max | RL Racing | 19th |
| 2012 | WSK Final Cup — KF3 | Ricky Flynn Motorsport | 20th |
| 2012 | Copa de Campeones — KF3 | | 3rd |
| 2013 | South Garda Winter Cup — KF3 | Ricky Flynn Motorsport | 5th |
| 2013 | Andrea Margutti Trophy — KF-J | Ricky Flynn Motorsport | 5th |
| 2013 | WSK Euro Series — KF-J | Ricky Flynn Motorsport | 1st |
| 2013 | WSK Super Master Series — KF-J | Ricky Flynn Motorsport | 2nd |
| 2013 | CIK-FIA European Championship — KF-J | Ricky Flynn Motorsport | 1st |
| 2013 | CIK-FIA International Super Cup — KF-J | Ricky Flynn Motorsport | 1st |
| 2013 | Rotax Max Euro Challenge — Junior Max | Ricky Flynn Motorsport | 7th |
| 2013 | Italian Championship — KF3 | Ricky Flynn Motorsport | 13th |
| 2013 | WSK Final Cup — KF-J | Ricky Flynn Motorsport | 7th |
| 2013 | Trofeo delle Industrie — KF3 | Ricky Flynn Motorsport | 5th |
| 2013 | CIK-FIA World Championship — KF-J | Ricky Flynn Motorsport | 4th |
| 2014 | South Garda Winter Cup — KF2 | Ricky Flynn Motorsport | 34th |
| 2014 | WSK Champions Cup — KF | Ricky Flynn Motorsport | 20th |
| 2014 | WSK Super Master Series — KF | Ricky Flynn Motorsport | 12th |
| 2014 | CIK-FIA European Championship — KF | Ricky Flynn Motorsport | 3rd |
| 2014 | CIK-FIA World Championship — KF | Ricky Flynn Motorsport | 1st |

=== Complete CIK-FIA results ===
==== Complete CIK-FIA Karting World Championship results ====
| Year | Entrant | Class | Circuit | QH | PF | F | Pos |
|---|---|---|---|---|---|---|---|
| 2013 | Ricky Flynn Motorsport | KF-J | (Italy) Sarno | 5th | 5th | 22nd | 4th |
| 2013 | Ricky Flynn Motorsport | KF-J | (Bahrain) Sakhir | 2nd | 1st | 1st | 4th |
| 2014 | Ricky Flynn Motorsport | KF | (France) Essay | 2nd | 2nd | 1st | —N/a |

==== Complete CIK-FIA Karting European Championship results ====
(key) (Races in bold indicate pole position; races in italics indicate fastest lap)

| Year | Entrant | Class | 1 | 2 | 3 | 4 | 5 | 6 | 7 | 8 | Pos | Points |
|---|---|---|---|---|---|---|---|---|---|---|---|---|
| 2013 | Ricky Flynn Motorsport | KF-J | ARA; QH; 1 | **ARA**; **PF**; 5 | ARA; F 1 | ORT; QH; 13 | ORT; PF; 9 | ORT; F 25 | | | 1st | 25 |
| 2014 | Ricky Flynn Motorsport | KF | LAC; QH; 1 | **LAC**; **F** 3 | ZUE; QH; 4 | ZUE; F 5 | GEN; QH; 2 | GEN; F Ret | PFI; QH; 11 | PFI; F 6 | 3rd | 65 |

== Racing record ==
=== Racing career summary ===
| Season | Series | Team | Races | Wins | Poles | F/Laps | Podiums | Points | Position |
|---|---|---|---|---|---|---|---|---|---|
| 2014 | Ginetta Junior Championship | HHC Motorsport | 20 | 4 | 8 | 2 | 11 | 432 | 3rd |
| 2015 | MSA Formula | Carlin | 30 | 8 | 10 | 9 | 15 | 413 | 1st |
| 2015 | ADAC Formula 4 | Mücke Motorsport | 8 | 1 | 0 | 3 | 6 | 131 | 8th |
| 2015 | Italian F4 Championship | Mücke Motorsport | 9 | 0 | 0 | 3 | 1 | 51 | 11th |
| 2015 | BRDC Formula 4 Autumn Trophy | HHC Motorsport | 4 | 2 | 1 | 1 | 4 | 128 | 5th |
| 2016 | Toyota Racing Series | M2 Competition | 15 | 6 | 8 | 5 | 11 | 924 | 1st |
| 2016 | Eurocup Formula Renault 2.0 | Josef Kaufmann Racing | 15 | 5 | 6 | 4 | 12 | 253 | 1st |
| 2016 | Formula Renault 2.0 Northern European Cup | Josef Kaufmann Racing | 15 | 6 | 10 | 4 | 11 | 316 | 1st |
| 2016 | BRDC British Formula 3 Championship | Carlin | 11 | 4 | 4 | 3 | 8 | 247 | 8th |
| 2016 | FIA Formula 3 European Championship | Carlin | 3 | 0 | 0 | 0 | 0 | —N/a | NC† |
| 2016 | Macau Grand Prix | Carlin | 1 | 0 | 0 | 0 | 0 | —N/a | 11th |
| 2017 | FIA Formula 3 European Championship | Carlin | 30 | 9 | 8 | 8 | 20 | 441 | 1st |
| 2017 | Macau Grand Prix | Carlin | 1 | 0 | 0 | 0 | 1 | —N/a | 2nd |
| 2017 | FIA Formula 2 Championship | Campos Racing | 2 | 0 | 0 | 0 | 0 | 0 | 25th |
| 2017 | Formula One | McLaren F1 Team | Test driver | | | | | | |
| 2018 | FIA Formula 2 Championship | Carlin | 24 | 1 | 1 | 1 | 9 | 219 | 2nd |
| 2018 | IMSA SportsCar Championship | United Autosports | 1 | 0 | 0 | 0 | 0 | 18 | 58th |
| 2018 | Formula One | McLaren F1 Team | Reserve driver | | | | | | |
| 2019 | Formula One | McLaren F1 Team | 21 | 0 | 0 | 0 | 0 | 49 | 11th |
| 2020 | Formula One | McLaren F1 Team | 17 | 0 | 0 | 2 | 1 | 97 | 9th |
| 2021 | Formula One | McLaren F1 Team | 22 | 0 | 1 | 1 | 4 | 160 | 6th |
| 2022 | Formula One | McLaren F1 Team | 22 | 0 | 0 | 2 | 1 | 122 | 7th |
| 2023 | Formula One | McLaren F1 Team | 22 | 0 | 0 | 1 | 7 | 205 | 6th |
| 2024 | Formula One | McLaren F1 Team | 24 | 4 | 8 | 6 | 13 | 374 | 2nd |
| 2025 | Formula One | McLaren F1 Team | 24 | 7 | 7 | 6 | 18 | 423 | 1st |
| 2026 | Formula One | McLaren Mastercard F1 Team | 20 | 3 | 4 | 2 | 6 | 246* | 6th* |

^{†} As Norris was a guest driver, he was ineligible for championship points.
* Season still in progress.

=== Complete Ginetta Junior Championship results ===
(key) (Races in bold indicate pole position; races in italics indicate fastest lap)

| Year | Entrant | 1 | 2 | 3 | 4 | 5 | 6 | 7 | 8 | 9 | 10 | 11 | 12 | 13 | 14 | 15 | 16 | 17 | 18 | 19 | 20 | Pos | Points |
|---|---|---|---|---|---|---|---|---|---|---|---|---|---|---|---|---|---|---|---|---|---|---|---|
| 2014 | HHC Motorsport | BHI; 1; 6 | BHI; 2; 10 | DON; 1; 2 | DON; 2; 2 | THR; 1 Ret | THR; 2; 10 | OUL; 1 DSQ | OUL; 2; 7 | **CRO**; **1**; 2 | **CRO**; **2**; 1 | **SNE**; **1**; 2 | **SNE**; **2**; 1 | **KNO**; **1**; 1 | KNO; 2; 2 | **ROC**; **1**; 7 | ROC; 2; 2 | SIL; 1; 5 | SIL; 2; 2 | **BHGP**; **1**; 9 | **BHGP**; **2**; 1 | 3rd | 432 |

=== Complete MSA Formula results ===
(key) (Races in bold indicate pole position; races in italics indicate fastest lap)

| Year | Entrant | 1 | 2 | 3 | 4 | 5 | 6 | 7 | 8 | 9 | 10 | 11 | 12 | 13 | 14 | 15 | 16 | 17 | 18 | 19 | 20 | 21 | 22 | 23 | 24 | 25 | 26 | 27 | 28 | 29 | 30 | Pos | Points |
|---|---|---|---|---|---|---|---|---|---|---|---|---|---|---|---|---|---|---|---|---|---|---|---|---|---|---|---|---|---|---|---|---|---|
| 2015 | Carlin | BHI; 1; 1 | BHI; 2; 9 | **BHI**; **3**; 1 | DON; 1; 4 | DON; 2; 6 | DON; 3; 10 | THR; 1; 10 | THR; 2; 1 | THR; 3; 3 | **OUL**; **1**; 2 | OUL; 2; 8 | **OUL**; **3**; 1 | **CRO**; **1** Ret | CRO; 2; 12 | **CRO**; **3**; 2 | SNE; 1; 2 | SNE; 2; 8 | SNE; 3; 2 | **KNO**; **1**; 1 | KNO; 2 Ret | KNO; 3; 7 | **ROC**; **1**; 1 | ROC; 2; 8 | ROC; 3; 2 | SIL; 1; 1 | SIL; 2; 7 | **SIL**; **3**; 10 | **BHGP**; **1**; 1 | BHGP; 2; 7 | **BHGP**; **3**; 2 | 1st | 413 |

=== Complete ADAC Formula 4 results ===
(key) (Races in bold indicate pole position; races in italics indicate fastest lap)

| Year | Entrant | 1 | 2 | 3 | 4 | 5 | 6 | 7 | 8 | 9 | 10 | 11 | 12 | 13 | 14 | 15 | 16 | 17 | 18 | 19 | 20 | 21 | 22 | 23 | 24 | Pos | Points |
|---|---|---|---|---|---|---|---|---|---|---|---|---|---|---|---|---|---|---|---|---|---|---|---|---|---|---|---|
| 2015 | Mücke Motorsport | OSC1; 1 | OSC1; 2 | OSC1; 3 | RBR; 1 | RBR; 2 | RBR; 3 | SPA; 1; 4 | SPA; 2; 2 | SPA; 3; 1 | LAU; 1 | LAU; 2 | LAU; 3 | NÜR; 1; 3 | NÜR; 2; 5 | NÜR; 3; 2 | SAC; 1 | SAC; 2 | SAC; 3 | OSC2; 1 | OSC2; 2 | OSC2; 3 | HOC; 1; 3 | HOC; 2; 2 | HOC; 3 DNS | 8th | 131 |

=== Complete Italian F4 Championship results ===
(key) (Races in bold indicate pole position; races in italics indicate fastest lap)

| Year | Entrant | 1 | 2 | 3 | 4 | 5 | 6 | 7 | 8 | 9 | 10 | 11 | 12 | 13 | 14 | 15 | 16 | 17 | 18 | 19 | 20 | 21 | Pos | Points |
|---|---|---|---|---|---|---|---|---|---|---|---|---|---|---|---|---|---|---|---|---|---|---|---|---|
| 2015 | Mücke Motorsport | VAL; 1 | VAL; 2 | VAL; 3 | MNZ; 1 Ret | MNZ; 2; 5 | MNZ; 3; 3 | IMO1; 1 | IMO1; 2 | IMO1; 3 | MUG; 1; 12 | MUG; 2; 7 | MUG; 3; 8 | ADR; 1 | ADR; 2 | ADR; 3 | IMO2; 1; 5 | IMO2; 2; 23 | IMO2; 3; 4 | MIS; 1 | MIS; 2 | MIS; 3 | 11th | 51 |

=== Complete BRDC Formula 4 Autumn Trophy results ===
(key) (Races in bold indicate pole position; races in italics indicate fastest lap)

| Year | Entrant | 1 | 2 | 3 | 4 | 5 | 6 | 7 | 8 | Pos | Points |
|---|---|---|---|---|---|---|---|---|---|---|---|
| 2015 | HHC Motorsport | SNE; 1 | SNE; 2 | SNE; 3 | SNE; 4 | **BRH**; **1**; 1 | BRH; 2; 1 | BRH; 3; 2 | BRH; 4; 2 | 5th | 128 |

=== Complete Toyota Racing Series results ===
(key) (Races in bold indicate pole position; races in italics indicate fastest lap)

| Year | Entrant | 1 | 2 | 3 | 4 | 5 | 6 | 7 | 8 | 9 | 10 | 11 | 12 | 13 | 14 | 15 | Pos | Points |
|---|---|---|---|---|---|---|---|---|---|---|---|---|---|---|---|---|---|---|
| 2016 | M2 Competition | **RUA**; **1**; 3 | RUA; 2; 1 | **RUA**; **3**; 9 | **TER**; **1**; 2 | TER; 2; 2 | **TER**; **3**; 1 | **HMP**; **1**; 1 | HMP; 2; 17 | HMP; 3; 6 | **TAU**; **1**; 1 | TAU; 2; 2 | **TAU**; **3**; 1 | MAU; 1; 3 | MAU; 2; 4 | **MAU**; **3**; 1 | 1st | 924 |

=== Complete Eurocup Formula Renault 2.0 results ===
(key) (Races in bold indicate pole position; races in italics indicate fastest lap)

| Year | Entrant | 1 | 2 | 3 | 4 | 5 | 6 | 7 | 8 | 9 | 10 | 11 | 12 | 13 | 14 | 15 | Pos | Points |
|---|---|---|---|---|---|---|---|---|---|---|---|---|---|---|---|---|---|---|
| 2016 | Josef Kaufmann Racing | ALC; 1; 2 | ALC; 2; 1 | **ALC**; **3**; 1 | MON; 16 | MNZ; 1; 1 | **MNZ**; **2**; 7 | MNZ; 3; 2 | **RBR**; **1**; 1 | RBR; 2; 3 | LEC; 1; 2 | **LEC**; **2**; 1 | **SPA**; **1**; 3 | SPA; 2; 2 | **EST**; **1**; 16 | EST; 2; 2 | 1st | 253 |

=== Complete Formula Renault 2.0 Northern European Cup results ===
(key) (Races in bold indicate pole position; races in italics indicate fastest lap)

| Year | Entrant | 1 | 2 | 3 | 4 | 5 | 6 | 7 | 8 | 9 | 10 | 11 | 12 | 13 | 14 | 15 | Pos | Points |
|---|---|---|---|---|---|---|---|---|---|---|---|---|---|---|---|---|---|---|
| 2016 | Josef Kaufmann Racing | MNZ; 1; 3 | MNZ; 2; 4 | SIL; 1 Ret | **SIL**; **2**; 1 | **HUN**; **1**; 1 | **HUN**; **2** Ret | **SPA**; **1**; 1 | **SPA**; **2**; 1 | **ASS**; **1**; 1 | **ASS**; **2**; 2 | **NÜR**; **1**; 2 | **NÜR**; **2**; 1 | **HOC**; **1**; 2 | HOC; 2; 4 | HOC; 3; 3 | 1st | 326 |

=== Complete BRDC British Formula 3 Championship results ===
(key) (Races in bold indicate pole position; races in italics indicate fastest lap)

| Year | Entrant | 1 | 2 | 3 | 4 | 5 | 6 | 7 | 8 | 9 | 10 | 11 | 12 | 13 | 14 | 15 | 16 | 17 | 18 | 19 | 20 | 21 | 22 | 23 | 24 | Pos | Points |
|---|---|---|---|---|---|---|---|---|---|---|---|---|---|---|---|---|---|---|---|---|---|---|---|---|---|---|---|
| 2016 | Carlin | **SNE1**; **1**; 1 | SNE1; 2; 6 | SNE1; 3; 3 | BRH; 1 | BRH; 2 | BRH; 3 | **ROC**; **1**; 1 | ROC; 2; 3 | ROC; 3; 3 | OUL; 1 | OUL; 2 | OUL; 3 | SIL; 1 Ret | SIL; 2; 2 | SIL; 3 C | **SPA**; **1**; 1 | SPA; 2; 19 | SPA; 3; 1 | SNE2; 1 | SNE2; 2 | SNE2; 3 | DON; 1 | DON; 2 | DON; 3 | 8th | 247 |

=== Complete FIA Formula 3 European Championship results ===
(key) (Races in bold indicate pole position; races in italics indicate fastest lap)

| Year | Entrant | Engine | 1 | 2 | 3 | 4 | 5 | 6 | 7 | 8 | 9 | 10 | 11 | 12 | 13 | 14 | 15 | 16 | 17 | 18 | 19 | 20 | 21 | 22 | 23 | 24 | 25 | 26 | 27 | 28 | 29 | 30 | Pos | Points |
|---|---|---|---|---|---|---|---|---|---|---|---|---|---|---|---|---|---|---|---|---|---|---|---|---|---|---|---|---|---|---|---|---|---|---|
| 2016 | Carlin | Volkswagen | LEC; 1 | LEC; 2 | LEC; 3 | HUN; 1 | HUN; 2 | HUN; 3 | PAU; 1 | PAU; 2 | PAU; 3 | RBR; 1 | RBR; 2 | RBR; 3 | NOR; 1 | NOR; 2 | NOR; 3 | ZAN; 1 | ZAN; 2 | ZAN; 3 | SPA; 1 | SPA; 2 | SPA; 3 | NÜR; 1 | NÜR; 2 | NÜR; 3 | IMO; 1 | IMO; 2 | IMO; 3 | HOC; 1 Ret | HOC; 2; 16 | HOC; 3; 16 | NC‡ | — |
| 2017 | Carlin | Volkswagen | **SIL**; **1**; 1 | SIL; 2; 9 | SIL; 3; 3 | MNZ; 1; 1 | MNZ; 2; 2 | MNZ; 3; 2 | PAU; 1; 2 | **PAU**; **2**; 2 | **PAU**; **3** Ret | HUN; 1; 8 | HUN; 2; 14 | HUN; 3; 3 | NOR; 1; 11 | NOR; 2; 1 | NOR; 3; 3 | **SPA**; **1**; 1 | **SPA**; **2** Ret | SPA; 3; 1 | **ZAN**; **1**; 1 | ZAN; 2; 3 | **ZAN**; **3**; 1 | **NÜR**; **1**; 1 | NÜR; 2; 2 | NÜR; 3; 1 | RBR; 1; 4 | RBR; 2; 2 | RBR; 3; 17† | HOC; 1; 2 | HOC; 2; 11 | HOC; 3; 4 | 1st | 441 |

^{†} Did not finish, but was classified as he had completed more than 90% of the race distance.
^{‡} As Norris was a guest driver, he was ineligible for championship points.

=== Complete Macau Grand Prix results ===
| Year | Entrant | Car | Qualifying | Quali race | Main race |
|---|---|---|---|---|---|
| 2016 | (United Kingdom) Carlin | Dallara F312 | 9th | DNF | 11th |
| 2017 | (United Kingdom) Carlin | Dallara F317 | 2nd | 7th | 2nd |

=== Complete FIA Formula 2 Championship results ===
(key) (Races in bold indicate pole position; races in italics indicate points for the fastest lap of the top-10 finishers)

| Year | Entrant | 1 | 2 | 3 | 4 | 5 | 6 | 7 | 8 | 9 | 10 | 11 | 12 | 13 | 14 | 15 | 16 | 17 | 18 | 19 | 20 | 21 | 22 | 23 | 24 | Pos | Points |
|---|---|---|---|---|---|---|---|---|---|---|---|---|---|---|---|---|---|---|---|---|---|---|---|---|---|---|---|
| 2017 | Campos Racing | BHR; FEA | BHR; SPR | CAT; FEA | CAT; SPR | MON; FEA | MON; SPR | BAK; FEA | BAK; SPR | RBR; FEA | RBR; SPR | SIL; FEA | SIL; SPR | HUN; FEA | HUN; SPR | SPA; FEA | SPA; SPR | MNZ; FEA | MNZ; SPR | JER; FEA | JER; SPR | YMC; FEA; Ret | YMC; SPR; 13 | | | 25th | 0 |
| 2018 | Carlin | **BHR**; **FEA**; 1 | BHR; SPR; 4 | BAK; FEA; 6 | BAK; SPR; 4 | CAT; FEA; 3 | CAT; SPR; 3 | MON; FEA; 6 | MON; SPR; 3 | LEC; FEA; 16 | LEC; SPR; 5 | RBR; FEA; 2 | RBR; SPR; 11 | SIL; FEA; 10 | SIL; SPR; 3 | HUN; FEA; 2 | HUN; SPR; 4 | SPA; FEA; 4 | SPA; SPR; 2 | MNZ; FEA; 6 | MNZ; SPR; 5 | SOC; FEA; Ret | SOC; SPR; Ret | YMC; FEA; 5 | YMC; SPR; 2 | 2nd | 219 |

=== Complete IMSA SportsCar Championship results ===
(key) (Races in bold indicate pole position; races in italics indicate fastest lap)

| Year | Entrant | Class | Chassis | Engine | 1 | 2 | 3 | 4 | 5 | 6 | 7 | 8 | 9 | 10 | Pos | Points |
|---|---|---|---|---|---|---|---|---|---|---|---|---|---|---|---|---|
| 2018 | United Autosports | P | Ligier JS P217 | Gibson GK428 4.2 V8 | DAY; 13 | SEB | LBH | MDO | DET | WGL | MOS | ELK | LGA | PET | 58th | 18 |

==== Complete 24 Hours of Daytona results ====
| Year | Team | Co-driver(s) | Car | Class | Laps | Pos. | Class pos. |
|---|---|---|---|---|---|---|---|
| 2018 | (United Kingdom) United Autosports | (United Kingdom) Phil Hanson (Spain) Fernando Alonso | Ligier JS P217-Gibson | P | 718 | 38th | 13th |

=== Complete Formula One results ===
(key) (Races in bold indicate pole position; races in italics indicate fastest lap; ^{superscript} indicates point-scoring sprint position)

| Year | Entrant | Chassis | Engine | 1 | 2 | 3 | 4 | 5 | 6 | 7 | 8 | 9 | 10 | 11 | 12 | 13 | 14 | 15 | 16 | 17 | 18 | 19 | 20 | 21 | 22 | 23 | 24 | WDC | Points |
|---|---|---|---|---|---|---|---|---|---|---|---|---|---|---|---|---|---|---|---|---|---|---|---|---|---|---|---|---|---|
| 2018 | McLaren F1 Team | McLaren MCL33 | Renault R.E.18 1.6 V6 t | AUS | BHR | CHN | AZE | ESP | MON | CAN | FRA | AUT | GBR | GER | HUN | BEL; TD | ITA; TD | SIN | RUS; TD | JPN; TD | USA; TD | MEX; TD | BRA; TD | ABU | | | | — | — |
| 2019 | McLaren F1 Team | McLaren MCL34 | Renault E-Tech 19 1.6 V6 t | AUS; 12 | BHR; 6 | CHN; 18† | AZE; 8 | ESP; Ret | MON; 11 | CAN; Ret | FRA; 9 | AUT; 6 | GBR; 11 | GER; Ret | HUN; 9 | BEL; 11† | ITA; 10 | SIN; 7 | RUS; 8 | JPN; 11 | MEX; Ret | USA; 7 | BRA; 8 | ABU; 8 | | | | 11th | 49 |
| 2020 | McLaren F1 Team | McLaren MCL35 | Renault E-Tech 20 1.6 V6 t | AUT; 3 | STY; 5 | HUN; 13 | GBR; 5 | 70A; 9 | ESP; 10 | BEL; 7 | ITA; 4 | TUS; 6 | RUS; 15 | EIF; Ret | POR; 13 | EMI; 8 | TUR; 8 | BHR; 4 | SKH; 10 | ABU; 5 | | | | | | | | 9th | 97 |
| 2021 | McLaren F1 Team | McLaren MCL35M | Mercedes-AMG M12 E Performance 1.6 V6 t | BHR; 4 | EMI; 3 | POR; 5 | ESP; 8 | MON; 3 | AZE; 5 | FRA; 5 | STY; 5 | AUT; 3 | GBR; 4 | HUN; Ret | BEL; 14 | NED; 10 | ITA; 2 | **RUS**; 7 | TUR; 7 | USA; 8 | MXC; 10 | SAP; 10 | QAT; 9 | SAU; 10 | ABU; 7 | | | 6th | 160 |
| 2022 | McLaren F1 Team | McLaren MCL36 | Mercedes-AMG M13 E Performance 1.6 V6 t | BHR; 15 | SAU; 7 | AUS; 5 | EMI; 3^{5} | MIA; Ret | ESP; 8 | MON; 6 | AZE; 9 | CAN; 15 | GBR; 6 | AUT; 7 | FRA; 7 | HUN; 7 | BEL; 12 | NED; 7 | ITA; 7 | SIN; 4 | JPN; 10 | USA; 6 | MXC; 9 | SAP; Ret^{7} | ABU; 6 | | | 7th | 122 |
| 2023 | McLaren F1 Team | McLaren MCL60 | Mercedes-AMG M14 E Performance 1.6 V6 t | BHR; 17 | SAU; 17 | AUS; 6 | AZE; 9 | MIA; 17 | MON; 9 | ESP; 17 | CAN; 13 | AUT; 4 | GBR; 2 | HUN; 2 | BEL; 7^{6} | NED; 7 | ITA; 8 | SIN; 2 | JPN; 2 | QAT; 3^{3} | USA; 2^{4} | MXC; 5 | SAP; 2^{2} | LVG; Ret | ABU; 5 | | | 6th | 205 |
| 2024 | McLaren F1 Team | McLaren MCL38 | Mercedes-AMG M15 E Performance 1.6 V6 t | BHR; 6 | SAU; 8 | AUS; 3 | JPN; 5 | CHN; 2^{6} | MIA; 1 | EMI; 2 | MON; 4 | CAN; 2 | **ESP**; 2 | AUT; 20†^{3} | GBR; 3 | **HUN**; 2 | BEL; 5 | **NED**; 1 | **ITA**; 3 | AZE; 4 | **SIN**; 1 | **USA**; 4^{3} | MXC; 2 | **SAP**; 6^{1} | LVG; 6 | QAT; 10^{2} | **ABU**; 1 | 2nd | 374 |
| 2025 | McLaren F1 Team | McLaren MCL39 | Mercedes-AMG M16 E Performance 1.6 V6 t | **AUS**; 1 | CHN; 2^{8} | JPN; 2 | BHR; 3 | SAU; 4 | MIA; 2^{1} | EMI; 2 | **MON**; 1 | ESP; 2 | CAN; 18† | **AUT**; 1 | GBR; 1 | **BEL**; 2^{3} | HUN; 1 | NED; 18† | ITA; 2 | AZE; 7 | SIN; 3 | USA; 2 | **MXC**; 1 | **SAP**; 1^{1} | **LVG**; DSQ | QAT; 4^{3} | ABU; 3 | 1st | 423 |
| 2026 | McLaren Mastercard F1 Team | McLaren MCL40 | Mercedes-AMG M17 E Performance 1.6 V6 t | AUS; 5 | CHN; DNS^{4} | JPN; 5 | MIA; 2^{1} | CAN; Ret^{2} | MON; Ret | BCN; 3 | AUT; 7 | GBR; 4^{3} | BEL; 7 | **HUN**; 1 | **NED**; 1^{3} | ITA; 4 | **ESP**; 3 | AZE; Ret | BHR; 9 | SIN; 4^{8} | USA; 5 | MXC; 5 | **SAP**; 1 | LVG | QAT | ABU | | 6th* | 246* |

^{†} Did not finish, but was classified as he had completed more than 90% of the race distance.
* Season still in progress.

== Notes ==
Sporting positions
| Preceded by Inaugural | MSA Formula; Champion; 2015 | Succeeded by Max Fewtrell (F4 British Championship) |
| Preceded by Lance Stroll | Toyota Racing Series; Champion; 2016 | Succeeded by Thomas Randle |
| Preceded by Lance Stroll | New Zealand Grand Prix; Winner; 2016 | Succeeded by Jehan Daruvala |
| Preceded by Jack Aitken | Eurocup Formula Renault 2.0; Champion; 2016 | Succeeded by Sacha Fenestraz |
| Preceded by Louis Delétraz | Formula Renault 2.0 NEC; Champion; 2016 | Succeeded by Michaël Benyahia |
| Preceded by Lance Stroll | FIA Formula 3 European Championship; Champion; 2017 | Succeeded by Mick Schumacher |
| Preceded by Joel Eriksson | FIA Formula 3 European Championship; Rookie Champion; 2017 | Succeeded by Robert Shwartzman |
| Preceded by Max Verstappen | Formula One; World Drivers' Champion; 2025 | Succeeded by Kimi Antonelli |
Awards
| Preceded by Will Palmer | McLaren Autosport BRDC Award; 2016 | Succeeded by Dan Ticktum |
| Preceded by Will Palmer | Autosport Awards; British Club Driver of the Year; 2016 | Succeeded by Enaam Ahmed |
| Preceded by Gordon Shedden | Autosport Awards; National Driver of the Year; 2017 | Succeeded by Dan Ticktum |
| Preceded by Lewis Hamilton | Autosport Awards; British Competition Driver of the Year; 2019–2021 | Succeeded by Lewis Hamilton |
| Preceded by Lewis Hamilton | Autosport Awards; British Competition Driver of the Year; 2023–2025 | Succeeded by Incumbent |
| Preceded by Max Verstappen | Best Driver ESPY Award; 2026 | Succeeded by Incumbent |
| Preceded by Kevin Magnussen | Lorenzo Bandini Trophy; 2023 | Succeeded by George Russell |
| Preceded by Max Verstappen | DHL Fastest Lap Award; 2024–2025 | Succeeded by Incumbent |
| Preceded by Lamine Yamal | Laureus World Sports Award for Breakthrough of the Year; 2026 | Succeeded by Incumbent |
