= List of red-flagged Formula One races =

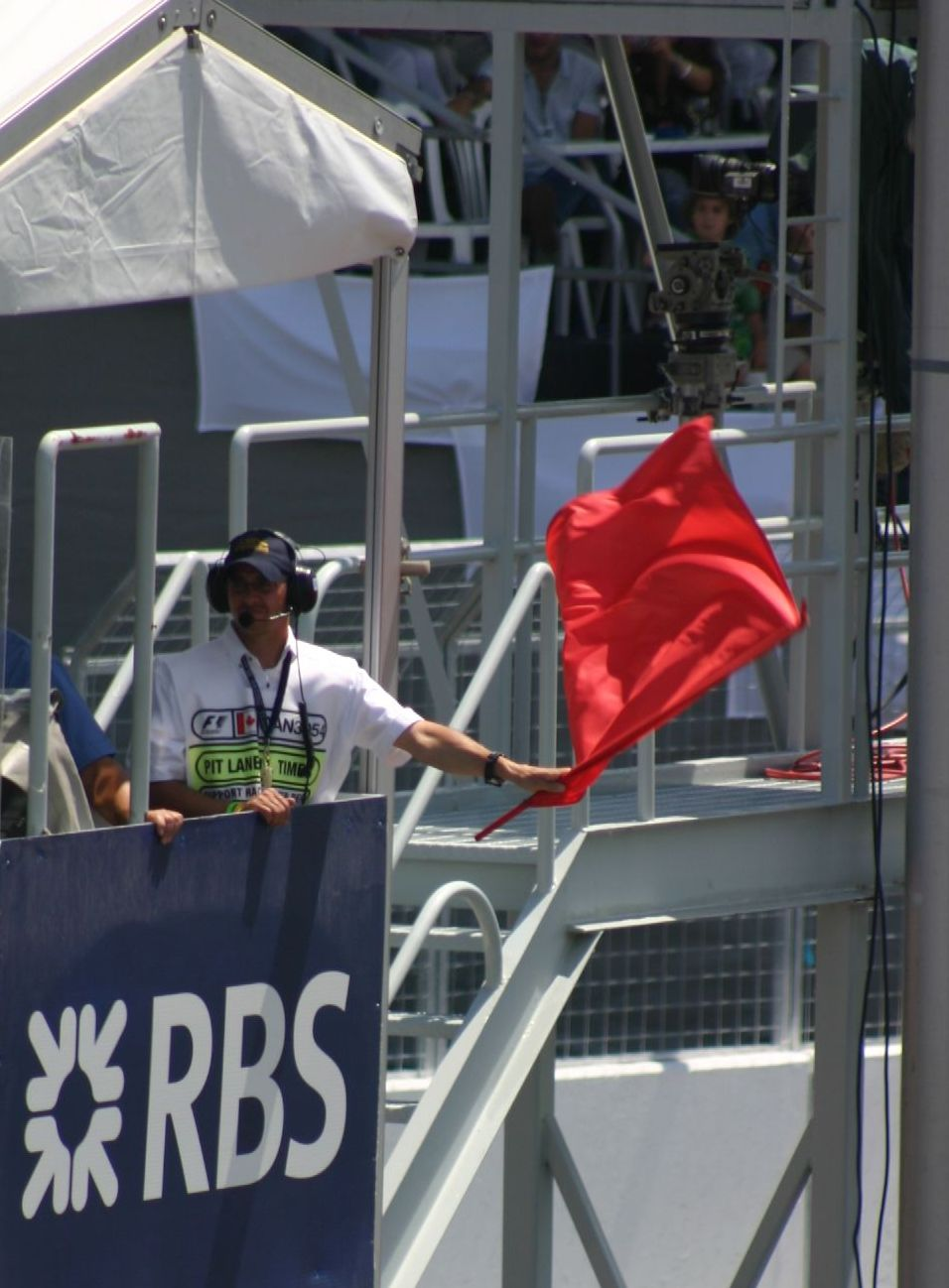
A red flag is shown to indicate an unscheduled stop to a race, usually for safety reasons.

Formula One, abbreviated to F1, is the highest class of open-wheeled auto racing defined by the Fédération Internationale de l'Automobile (FIA), motorsport's world governing body. The "formula" in the name refers to a set of rules to which all participants and vehicles must conform. The Formula One World Championship season consists of a series of races, known as Grands Prix, usually held on purpose-built circuits, and in a few cases on closed city streets. The results of each race are combined to determine two annual championships, one for drivers and one for constructors.

A red flag is shown when there has been a crash or the track conditions are poor enough to warrant the race being stopped. The flags are displayed by the marshals at various points around the circuit. A Global Positioning System (GPS) marshalling system was introduced in 2007. It involves a display of flag signals in the driver's cockpit, which alerts them to the crash. Following a red flag being shown, the exit of the pit lane is closed and cars must proceed to the pit lane slowly without overtaking, lining up at the pit exit. From 2005, a ten-minute warning is given before the race is resumed behind the safety car, which leads the field for a lap before it returns to the pit lane. Previously, the race was restarted in race order from the penultimate lap before the red flag was shown. If a race is unable to be resumed, "the results will be taken at the end of the penultimate lap before the lap during which the signal to suspend the race was given". If 75% of the race distance has not been completed and the race cannot be resumed, half points are awarded. Until 2015, no points were supposed to be awarded if the race could not be restarted and less than two laps had been completed, but starting in 2016 this rule was updated to "no points if two laps or less have been completed".

Since the first World Championship Grand Prix in 1950, red flags have been shown in 92 World Championship Formula One races, with the latest one being at the 2026 Mexico City Grand Prix. A total of 26 races were restarted on the first lap, while 13 Grands Prix were not restarted, nine because of rain and four due to crashes involving drivers. Another five races were stopped due to incidents that resulted in fatalities: the 1975 Spanish Grand Prix was stopped on lap 29 and not restarted after Rolf Stommelen's car crashed into a spectator area, killing five people; the 1978 Italian Grand Prix was red-flagged after a massive crash that ultimately contributed to the death of Ronnie Peterson; the 1982 Canadian Grand Prix was halted on the first lap after Riccardo Paletti was killed when his car collided with the back of Didier Pironi's Ferrari; the 1994 San Marino Grand Prix was red-flagged following the fatal crash of Ayrton Senna, in which his car crashed into a wall at the Tamburello curve; the 2014 Japanese Grand Prix was red-flagged for a second time following a serious collision between Jules Bianchi and a recovery vehicle which would ultimately prove to be fatal. The 2023 Australian Grand Prix holds the record for most red flags, with three.

== Red-flagged races ==
Key
N	Indicates the race was not restarted
Y	Indicates the race was restarted over the original distance
R	Indicates the race was resumed to complete the originally scheduled distance
S	Indicates the race was restarted or resumed with the originally scheduled distance not completed

- The "Lap" column identifies the lap on which the race was stopped.
- The "R" column indicates whether or not the race was restarted:

Formula One World Championship races that have been red-flagged
Year	Grand Prix	Lap	R	Winner	Incident that prompted red flag	Failed to make the restart (Note: Drivers who had already retired are not listed, only those who failed to make the restart after the red flag incident.)		Ref.
Year	Grand Prix	Lap	R	Winner	Incident that prompted red flag	Drivers	Reason	Ref.
1971	Canadian	64	N	Jackie Stewart	Mist.			
1973	British	2	Y	Peter Revson	Crash involving Jody Scheckter, Jean-Pierre Beltoise, George Follmer, Mike Hailwood, Carlos Pace, Jochen Mass, Jackie Oliver, Roger Williamson and Andrea de Adamich	Jody Scheckter; Jean-Pierre Beltoise; George Follmer; Mike Hailwood; Carlos Pace; Jochen Mass; Jackie Oliver; Roger Williamson	Crash	
1973	British	2	Y	Peter Revson	Crash involving Jody Scheckter, Jean-Pierre Beltoise, George Follmer, Mike Hailwood, Carlos Pace, Jochen Mass, Jackie Oliver, Roger Williamson and Andrea de Adamich	Andrea de Adamich	Crash, injured	
1973	British	2	Y	Peter Revson	Crash involving Jody Scheckter, Jean-Pierre Beltoise, George Follmer, Mike Hailwood, Carlos Pace, Jochen Mass, Jackie Oliver, Roger Williamson and Andrea de Adamich	David Purley	Spun off	
1973	British	2	Y	Peter Revson	Crash involving Jody Scheckter, Jean-Pierre Beltoise, George Follmer, Mike Hailwood, Carlos Pace, Jochen Mass, Jackie Oliver, Roger Williamson and Andrea de Adamich	Graham McRae	Throttle	
1974	Brazilian	32	N	Emerson Fittipaldi	Rain.			
1975	Spanish	29	N	Jochen Mass	Crash of Rolf Stommelen which killed four people. Half points were awarded. (Note: At the time, half points are awarded when a race cannot be restarted and less than 75 per cent of the race distance has been completed.)			
1975	British	56	N	Emerson Fittipaldi	Rain and crashes involving Wilson Fittipaldi, Jochen Mass, John Watson, Carlos Pace, Jody Scheckter, James Hunt and Mark Donohue.			
1975	Austrian	29	N	Vittorio Brambilla	Rain. Half points were awarded.			
1976	British	1	Y	Niki Lauda	Crash at the start involving Clay Regazzoni, James Hunt, Jacques Laffite and Niki Lauda.	None, although Clay Regazzoni and Jacques Laffite illegally used their spare cars at the restart, and were subsequently disqualified. James Hunt would be disqualified two months later.		
1976	German	2	Y	James Hunt	Crash involving Niki Lauda, Brett Lunger and Harald Ertl.	Niki Lauda	Crash, injured	
1976	German	2	Y	James Hunt	Crash involving Niki Lauda, Brett Lunger and Harald Ertl.	Brett Lunger; Harald Ertl	Crash	
1976	German	2	Y	James Hunt	Crash involving Niki Lauda, Brett Lunger and Harald Ertl.	Chris Amon	Withdrew	
1976	German	2	Y	James Hunt	Crash involving Niki Lauda, Brett Lunger and Harald Ertl.	Hans-Joachim Stuck	Clutch	
1976	German	2	Y	James Hunt	Crash involving Niki Lauda, Brett Lunger and Harald Ertl.	Jacques Laffite	Gearbox	
1978	Austrian	7	R	Ronnie Peterson	Rain. The race was decided by combining the time from the first 7 laps with the time from the restarted 47 laps.	Mario Andretti; Jody Scheckter; Nelson Piquet; Héctor Rebaque; Harald Ertl; Riccardo Patrese; Alan Jones; James Hunt	Spun off	
1978	Italian	1	S	Niki Lauda	Crash involving Ronnie Peterson, Riccardo Patrese, James Hunt, Vittorio Brambilla, Hans-Joachim Stuck, Patrick Depailler, Didier Pironi, Derek Daly, Clay Regazzoni and Brett Lunger. The race was shortened to 40 laps from the scheduled 52 laps due to the concerns over darkness.	Ronnie Peterson	Fatal crash	
1978	Italian	1	S	Niki Lauda	Crash involving Ronnie Peterson, Riccardo Patrese, James Hunt, Vittorio Brambilla, Hans-Joachim Stuck, Patrick Depailler, Didier Pironi, Derek Daly, Clay Regazzoni and Brett Lunger. The race was shortened to 40 laps from the scheduled 52 laps due to the concerns over darkness.	Vittorio Brambilla; Hans-Joachim Stuck	Injured	
1978	Italian	1	S	Niki Lauda	Crash involving Ronnie Peterson, Riccardo Patrese, James Hunt, Vittorio Brambilla, Hans-Joachim Stuck, Patrick Depailler, Didier Pironi, Derek Daly, Clay Regazzoni and Brett Lunger. The race was shortened to 40 laps from the scheduled 52 laps due to the concerns over darkness.	Didier Pironi	Spare car used by teammate	
1978	Italian	1	S	Niki Lauda	Crash involving Ronnie Peterson, Riccardo Patrese, James Hunt, Vittorio Brambilla, Hans-Joachim Stuck, Patrick Depailler, Didier Pironi, Derek Daly, Clay Regazzoni and Brett Lunger. The race was shortened to 40 laps from the scheduled 52 laps due to the concerns over darkness.	Brett Lunger	No spare car available	
1979	Argentine	1	Y	Jacques Laffite	A huge crash involving Jody Scheckter, Arturo Merzario, Didier Pironi, Nelson Piquet, John Watson, Patrick Tambay and Mario Andretti.	Arturo Merzario; Didier Pironi	Crash	
1979	Argentine	1	Y	Jacques Laffite	A huge crash involving Jody Scheckter, Arturo Merzario, Didier Pironi, Nelson Piquet, John Watson, Patrick Tambay and Mario Andretti.	Jody Scheckter; Nelson Piquet	Injured	
1979	Argentine	1	Y	Jacques Laffite	A huge crash involving Jody Scheckter, Arturo Merzario, Didier Pironi, Nelson Piquet, John Watson, Patrick Tambay and Mario Andretti.	Patrick Tambay	Spare car used by teammate	
1979	South African	2	R	Gilles Villeneuve	Rain.			
1980	Canadian	1	Y	Alan Jones	Crash involving Jean-Pierre Jarier, Derek Daly, Emerson Fittipaldi, Keke Rosberg, Mario Andretti, Gilles Villeneuve and Jochen Mass.	Derek Daly	No spare car available	
1980	Canadian	1	Y	Alan Jones	Crash involving Jean-Pierre Jarier, Derek Daly, Emerson Fittipaldi, Keke Rosberg, Mario Andretti, Gilles Villeneuve and Jochen Mass.	Mike Thackwell	Car used by teammate	
1981	Belgian	2	R (Note: The race was restarted with the intention of completing the originally scheduled distance, which was only prevented by the second red flag.)	Carlos Reutemann	Start crash that involved Riccardo Patrese and teammate Siegfried Stohr, injuring Patrese's mechanic.	Riccardo Patrese; Siegfried Stohr	Team withdrew after mechanic got injured	
1981	Belgian	54	N	Carlos Reutemann	Rain.			
1981	French	58	R	Alain Prost	Rain. The race was decided by combining the time from the first 58 laps with the time from the restarted 22 laps.			
1982	Detroit	7	S (Note: The race was resumed, but did not cover its scheduled distance as it had a rules-imposed time limit.)	John Watson	Crash involving Elio de Angelis, Roberto Guerrero, and Riccardo Patrese. The race was decided by combining the time from the first 6 laps with the time from the restarted 64 laps, shortened to 56 laps due to the two-hour time limit.	Riccardo Patrese; Roberto Guerrero	Crash	
1982	Canadian	1	Y	Nelson Piquet	Didier Pironi stalled his car at the start, causing Riccardo Paletti to crash fatally into the back of Pironi's car. Geoff Lees, Raul Boesel and Eliseo Salazar were also involved in separate crashes at the start.	Riccardo Paletti	Fatal crash	
1982	Canadian	1	Y	Nelson Piquet	Didier Pironi stalled his car at the start, causing Riccardo Paletti to crash fatally into the back of Pironi's car. Geoff Lees, Raul Boesel and Eliseo Salazar were also involved in separate crashes at the start.	Geoff Lees	Crash	
1982	Canadian	1	Y	Nelson Piquet	Didier Pironi stalled his car at the start, causing Riccardo Paletti to crash fatally into the back of Pironi's car. Geoff Lees, Raul Boesel and Eliseo Salazar were also involved in separate crashes at the start.	Jean-Pierre Jarier	Withdrew	
1984	Monaco	31	N	Alain Prost	Rain. Half points were awarded.			
1984	Detroit	1	Y	Nelson Piquet	Crash at the start involving Nelson Piquet, Ayrton Senna, Michele Alboreto and Marc Surer	Marc Surer	No spare car available	
1984	British	11	S	Niki Lauda	Crash of Jonathan Palmer. The race was restarted for 60 laps, rather than the original 64 laps.			
1984	Austrian	1	Y	Niki Lauda	Improper start procedure.			
1985	Austrian	1	Y	Alain Prost	Crash at the start involving Teo Fabi, Elio de Angelis, Michele Alboreto and Gerhard Berger.	Piercarlo Ghinzani	Car used by teammate	
1986	British	1	Y	Nigel Mansell	Nigel Mansell suffered a driveshaft failure at the start, resulting in a crash involving a number of cars which included Thierry Boutsen, Jacques Laffite, Christian Danner, Piercarlo Ghinzani, Allen Berg and Jonathan Palmer.	Jacques Laffite	Injured	
1986	British	1	Y	Nigel Mansell	Nigel Mansell suffered a driveshaft failure at the start, resulting in a crash involving a number of cars which included Thierry Boutsen, Jacques Laffite, Christian Danner, Piercarlo Ghinzani, Allen Berg and Jonathan Palmer.	Christian Danner	Spare car used by teammate	
1986	British	1	Y	Nigel Mansell	Nigel Mansell suffered a driveshaft failure at the start, resulting in a crash involving a number of cars which included Thierry Boutsen, Jacques Laffite, Christian Danner, Piercarlo Ghinzani, Allen Berg and Jonathan Palmer.	Piercarlo Ghinzani; Allen Berg	No spare car available	
1987	Belgian	2	Y	Alain Prost	Crash involving Jonathan Palmer and Philippe Streiff.	Jonathan Palmer	Spare car used by teammate	
1987	Austrian	1	Y	Nigel Mansell	The first race start ended quickly after Martin Brundle crashed, then Jonathan Palmer, Philippe Streiff and Piercarlo Ghinzani collided.			
1987	Austrian	1	Y	Nigel Mansell	The second race start ended quickly after Nigel Mansell crawled away with clutch problems and then Eddie Cheever and Riccardo Patrese collided and half the grid, including Stefan Johansson, Alex Caffi, Ivan Capelli, Pascal Fabre, Philippe Alliot, Martin Brundle and Christian Danner were involved in the ensuing pile-up.	Philippe Streiff	Spare car used by teammate	
1987	Portuguese	2	Y	Alain Prost	A multi-car collision on the opening lap. Nelson Piquet and Michele Alboreto collided at the start. Derek Warwick, Satoru Nakajima, Martin Brundle, Christian Danner, Philippe Alliot, René Arnoux and Adrián Campos were all involved in the ensuing crash.	Christian Danner	Spare car used by teammate	
1987	Mexican	30	S	Nigel Mansell	Crash of Derek Warwick. The race was decided by combining the time from the first 30 laps with the time from the restarted 33 laps.			
1988	Portuguese	1	Y	Alain Prost	After the first start was aborted, the second start was red-flagged after Derek Warwick stalled his car and was hit by Andrea de Cesaris, with Luis Pérez-Sala and Satoru Nakajima also involved.			
1989	San Marino	4	S	Ayrton Senna	Crash of Gerhard Berger. The race was shortened from 61 to 58 laps, and was decided by combining the time from the first 3 laps with the time from the restarted 55 laps.	Gerhard Berger	Injured	
1989	Mexican	2	Y	Ayrton Senna	Crash involving Stefano Modena and Olivier Grouillard			
1989	French	1	Y	Alain Prost	Crash involving Nigel Mansell, Maurício Gugelmin, Thierry Boutsen, René Arnoux and Jonathan Palmer			
1989	Australian	2	Y	Thierry Boutsen	Crash involving JJ Lehto.	Alain Prost	Withdrew	
1989	Australian	2	Y	Thierry Boutsen	Crash involving JJ Lehto.	Nicola Larini	Electrical	
1990	Monaco	1	Y	Ayrton Senna	Crash involving Gerhard Berger and Alain Prost which partially blocked the track.			
1990	Belgian	1	Y	Ayrton Senna	Multiple crashes on the first lap, involving Martin Donnelly, Nigel Mansell, Aguri Suzuki and several others.	Aguri Suzuki		
1990	Belgian	1	Y	Ayrton Senna	Crash involving Paolo Barilla, resulting in a damaged guardrail.	Paolo Barilla		
1990	Italian	2	Y	Ayrton Senna	Crash of Derek Warwick.			
1990	Portuguese	61	N	Nigel Mansell	Crash involving Aguri Suzuki and Alex Caffi.			
1991	Australian	14	N	Ayrton Senna	Rain. Half points were awarded.			
1992	French	18	S	Nigel Mansell	Rain. The race was decided by combining the time from the first 18 laps with the time from the restarted 51 laps.			
1994	San Marino	7	S	Michael Schumacher	Fatal crash of Ayrton Senna. The race was shortened from 61 to 58 laps, and was decided by combining the time from the first 5 laps with the time from the restarted 53 laps.	Ayrton Senna	Fatal crash	
1994	San Marino	7	S	Michael Schumacher	Fatal crash of Ayrton Senna. The race was shortened from 61 to 58 laps, and was decided by combining the time from the first 5 laps with the time from the restarted 53 laps.	Érik Comas	Withdrew	
1994	Italian	1	Y	Damon Hill	Crash involving Johnny Herbert, Eddie Irvine, David Coulthard and Olivier Panis			
1994	Japanese	15	S	Damon Hill	Rain and a crash involving Martin Brundle, resulting in an injured marshal. The race was restarted with race leader Michael Schumacher behind the safety car and was decided by combining the time from the first 13 laps with the time of the restarted 37 laps.	Martin Brundle	Crash	
1995	Argentine	1	Y	Damon Hill	Several crashes involving Jean Alesi, Mika Salo, Luca Badoer, Olivier Panis, Pierluigi Martini, Johnny Herbert, Rubens Barrichello and Ukyo Katayama.	Luca Badoer	Spare car used by teammate	
1995	Monaco	1	Y	Michael Schumacher	Crash involving Jean Alesi, Gerhard Berger and David Coulthard.	Domenico Schiattarella	Car damaged by marshals	
1995	Monaco	1	Y	Michael Schumacher	Crash involving Jean Alesi, Gerhard Berger and David Coulthard.	Jos Verstappen	Gearbox	
1995	Italian	1	Y	Johnny Herbert	Crash involving Max Papis, Jean-Christophe Boullion, Andrea Montermini, Pedro Diniz and Roberto Moreno.	Andrea Montermini; Roberto Moreno	No spare car available	
1995	Portuguese	1	Y	David Coulthard	Crash involving Ukyo Katayama, Luca Badoer, Pedro Diniz and Roberto Moreno.	Ukyo Katayama	Crash, injured	
1995	Portuguese	1	Y	David Coulthard	Crash involving Ukyo Katayama, Luca Badoer, Pedro Diniz and Roberto Moreno.	Max Papis	Gearbox	
1996	Australian	1	Y	Damon Hill	Crash involving Martin Brundle, David Coulthard and Johnny Herbert.	Johnny Herbert	Spare car used by teammate	
1997	Brazilian	1	Y	Jacques Villeneuve	Rubens Barrichello stalled his car at the start, followed by several crashes involving Giancarlo Fisichella, Jacques Villeneuve, Jan Magnussen, Damon Hill, Johnny Herbert and Eddie Irvine.	Jan Magnussen	Spare car used by teammate	
1997	Canadian	56	N	Michael Schumacher	Crash of Olivier Panis. (Note: Race was stopped behind the safety car.)			
1998	Canadian	1	Y	Michael Schumacher	Crash involving Jean Alesi, Johnny Herbert, Jarno Trulli and Alexander Wurz.			
1998	French	1	S	Michael Schumacher	Improper start procedure after Jos Verstappen stalled his car at the start. (Note: When Jos Verstappen stalled his car on the grid, Race Director Charlie Whiting attempted to abort the start, a procedure that is carried out when a car is stalled before the lights go out. However, the lights went out before he had the chance to do so, and as a result the lights afterwards displayed the standard 5 red lights and 3 amber lights. The race was immediately stopped, but the red flag was not displayed until the cars came to the start/finish line. As is the case when a start is aborted, the race was shortened by one lap as the cars were not refuelled, but Verstappen was allowed to regain his original grid position in 15th.)			
1998	Belgian	1	Y	Damon Hill	Massive crash involving David Coulthard, Jos Verstappen, Eddie Irvine, Alexander Wurz, Rubens Barrichello, Johnny Herbert, Olivier Panis, Jarno Trulli, Mika Salo, Pedro Diniz, Toranosuke Takagi, Ricardo Rosset and Shinji Nakano.	Rubens Barrichello; Ricardo Rosset; Mika Salo; Olivier Panis	Spare car used by teammate	
1999	British	1	Y	David Coulthard	Jacques Villeneuve and Alessandro Zanardi stalled their cars at the start. Michael Schumacher crashed after the red flag was shown.	Michael Schumacher	Crash, injured	
2000	Monaco	1	Y	David Coulthard	Initially shown due to a technical fault in the FIA computer. Pedro de la Rosa and Jenson Button collided after the red flag was shown which blocked the road for Jacques Villeneuve, Ricardo Zonta, Nick Heidfeld, Pedro Diniz, Gastón Mazzacane and Marc Gené.	Pedro de la Rosa	No spare car available	
2001	German	2	Y	Ralf Schumacher	Crash involving Luciano Burti and Michael Schumacher.			
2001	Belgian	5	S (Note: From the 2000 season, races stopped after two laps but before three-quarters race distance had been completed would be restarted with the cars lining up on the grid in the order they were at the end of the penultimate lap before the lap during which the red flag was shown. Only the race order and number of laps completed were taken into account for the new race, time differences between the cars were voided. The distance of the new race was the number of laps remaining from the original races, minus three laps, with the lap counter also reset to lap one.)	Michael Schumacher	Crash involving Luciano Burti and Eddie Irvine, resulting in a damaged tyre wall.	Luciano Burti	Crash, injured	
2001	Belgian	5	S	Michael Schumacher	Crash involving Luciano Burti and Eddie Irvine, resulting in a damaged tyre wall.	Eddie Irvine	Crash	
2001	Belgian	5	S	Michael Schumacher	Crash involving Luciano Burti and Eddie Irvine, resulting in a damaged tyre wall.	Kimi Räikkönen	Transmission	
2001	Belgian	5	S	Michael Schumacher	Crash involving Luciano Burti and Eddie Irvine, resulting in a damaged tyre wall.	Fernando Alonso	Gearbox	
2003	Brazilian	56	N	Giancarlo Fisichella (Note: Kimi Räikkönen was originally awarded the race win, but after an error in the declared results was discovered several days later by race officials, the win was reallocated to Giancarlo Fisichella.)	Crashes of Mark Webber and Fernando Alonso.			
2007	European	5	R	Fernando Alonso	Torrential rain and crashes involving Jenson Button, Nico Rosberg, Adrian Sutil, Lewis Hamilton, Scott Speed and Vitantonio Liuzzi.	Jenson Button; Nico Rosberg; Adrian Sutil; Scott Speed; Vitantonio Liuzzi	Crash	
2009	Malaysian	33	N	Jenson Button	Torrential rain and crashes of Sébastien Buemi, Sebastian Vettel and Giancarlo Fisichella. Half points were awarded.			
2010	Korean	3	R	Fernando Alonso	Rain.			
2011	Monaco	72	R (Note: This was the first Grand Prix to be resumed despite 75% of the race distance having been completed, due to a 2005 regulation change that saw the terms "stopping" and "restarting" a race replaced with "suspending" and "resuming". Under the new regulations, regardless of distance completed, all races would be resumed behind the safety car with the cars in the order they were at the time of the red flag, once it was safe to do so. Only in the event that it was not possible to resume the race (including the four-hour rule) would a result be declared from the penultimate lap before the lap during which the red flag was shown.)	Sebastian Vettel	Crash involving Adrian Sutil, Lewis Hamilton, Jaime Alguersuari and Vitaly Petrov.	Jaime Alguersuari; Vitaly Petrov	Crash	
2011	Canadian	25	R	Jenson Button	Rain.			
2012	Malaysian	9	R	Fernando Alonso	Rain.			
2013	Monaco	46	R	Nico Rosberg	Crash involving Pastor Maldonado and Max Chilton, resulting in a damaged barrier blocking the track.	Pastor Maldonado	Crash	
2014	British	1	R	Lewis Hamilton	Crash involving Kimi Räikkönen, Felipe Massa and Kamui Kobayashi, resulting in a damaged guardrail.	Kimi Räikkönen; Felipe Massa	Crash	
2014	Japanese	2	R	Lewis Hamilton	Torrential rain as a consequence of Typhoon Phanfone.			
2014	Japanese	46	N	Lewis Hamilton	Fatal crash of Jules Bianchi.			
2016	Australian	18	R	Nico Rosberg	Crash involving Fernando Alonso and Esteban Gutiérrez.	Fernando Alonso	Crash, Injured	
2016	Australian	18	R	Nico Rosberg	Crash involving Fernando Alonso and Esteban Gutiérrez.	Esteban Gutiérrez	Crash	
2016	Australian	18	R	Nico Rosberg	Crash involving Fernando Alonso and Esteban Gutiérrez.	Rio Haryanto	Driveshaft	
2016	Belgian	9	R	Nico Rosberg	Crash of Kevin Magnussen, resulting in a damaged barrier.	Kevin Magnussen	Crash	
2016	Brazilian	20	R	Lewis Hamilton	Rain and crash of Kimi Räikkönen.	Kimi Räikkönen	Crash	
2016	Brazilian	20	R	Lewis Hamilton	Rain and crash of Kimi Räikkönen.	Jolyon Palmer	Collision Damage	
2016	Brazilian	28	R	Lewis Hamilton	Rain.			
2017	Azerbaijan	22	R	Daniel Ricciardo	Debris on the track following multiple incidents.			
2020	Italian	27	R (Note: The race was resumed under the safety car, which led the field for one official lap, before racing resumed with a standing start.)	Pierre Gasly	Crash of Charles Leclerc, resulting in a damaged barrier.	Charles Leclerc	Crash	
2020	Tuscan	9	R	Lewis Hamilton	Crash involving Carlos Sainz Jr., Nicholas Latifi, Kevin Magnussen and Antonio Giovinazzi.	Carlos Sainz Jr. Nicholas Latifi; Kevin Magnussen; Antonio Giovinazzi	Crash	
2020	Tuscan	9	R	Lewis Hamilton	Crash involving Carlos Sainz Jr., Nicholas Latifi, Kevin Magnussen and Antonio Giovinazzi.	Esteban Ocon	Brakes	
2020	Tuscan	46	R	Lewis Hamilton	Crash of Lance Stroll, resulting in a damaged barrier.	Lance Stroll	Crash	
2020	Bahrain	1	R	Lewis Hamilton	Crash of Romain Grosjean.	Romain Grosjean	Crash, injured	
2021	Emilia Romagna	33	R	Max Verstappen	Crash involving Valtteri Bottas and George Russell, resulting in debris on the track.	Valtteri Bottas; George Russell	Crash	
2021	Azerbaijan	48	R	Sergio Pérez	Crash of Max Verstappen, resulting in debris on the track.	Max Verstappen	Crash	
2021	British	2	R	Lewis Hamilton	Crash involving Lewis Hamilton and Max Verstappen, resulting in a damaged barrier.	Max Verstappen	Crash	
2021	Hungarian	2	R	Esteban Ocon	Crashes involving Valtteri Bottas, Lando Norris, Max Verstappen, Sergio Pérez, Lance Stroll, Daniel Ricciardo and Charles Leclerc, resulting in debris on the track.	Valtteri Bottas; Charles Leclerc; Lance Stroll; Sergio Pérez; Lando Norris	Crash	
2021	Belgian	3	N	Max Verstappen	Rain. Half points were awarded.			
2021	Saudi Arabian	13	R	Lewis Hamilton	Crash of Mick Schumacher, resulting in a damaged barrier.	Mick Schumacher	Crash	
2021	Saudi Arabian	15	R	Lewis Hamilton	Crashes involving Charles Leclerc, Nikita Mazepin, Sergio Pérez and George Russell.	Nikita Mazepin; Sergio Pérez; George Russell	Crash	
2022	Monaco	30	S	Sergio Pérez	Crash of Mick Schumacher, resulting in a damaged barrier.	Mick Schumacher	Crash	
2022	British	1	R	Carlos Sainz Jr.	Crash involving Pierre Gasly, George Russell, Zhou Guanyu, Yuki Tsunoda, Esteban Ocon, Alexander Albon and Sebastian Vettel.	George Russell; Zhou Guanyu; Alexander Albon	Crash	
2022	Japanese	2	S	Max Verstappen	Rain and crash of Carlos Sainz Jr.	Carlos Sainz Jr.	Crash	
2022	Japanese	2	S	Max Verstappen	Rain and crash of Carlos Sainz Jr.	Alexander Albon	Collision damage	
2023	Australian	8	R	Max Verstappen	Crash of Alexander Albon, resulting in gravel on track.	Alexander Albon	Crash	
2023	Australian	55	R	Max Verstappen	Crash of Kevin Magnussen.	Kevin Magnussen	Crash	
2023	Australian	57	R (Note: The race was resumed under the safety car, which led the field for one official lap, before racing finished with a rolling start to the finish line.)	Max Verstappen	Crashes involving Logan Sargeant, Nyck de Vries, Esteban Ocon and Pierre Gasly.	Logan Sargeant; Nyck de Vries; Esteban Ocon; Pierre Gasly	Crash	
2023	Dutch	64	R	Max Verstappen	Rain and crash of Zhou Guanyu, resulting in a damaged barrier. (Note: Race was stopped under the virtual safety car.)	Zhou Guanyu	Crash	
2023	Mexico City	34	R	Max Verstappen	Crash of Kevin Magnussen, resulting in a damaged barrier.	Kevin Magnussen	Crash	
2023	São Paulo	2	R	Max Verstappen	Crash involving Alexander Albon and Kevin Magnussen, resulting in a damaged barrier and debris on the track.	Alexander Albon; Kevin Magnussen	Crash	
2024	Japanese	1	R	Max Verstappen	Crash involving Daniel Ricciardo and Alexander Albon, resulting in a damaged barrier.	Daniel Ricciardo; Alexander Albon	Crash	
2024	Monaco	1	R	Charles Leclerc	Crash involving Sergio Pérez, Nico Hülkenberg and Kevin Magnussen, resulting in a damaged barrier and debris on the track.	Sergio Pérez; Nico Hülkenberg; Kevin Magnussen	Crash	
2024	Monaco	1	R	Charles Leclerc	Crash involving Sergio Pérez, Nico Hülkenberg and Kevin Magnussen, resulting in a damaged barrier and debris on the track.	Esteban Ocon	Collision damage	
2024	São Paulo	32	S (Note: The race was shortened from the original scheduled distance due to two aborted start procedures, before the red flag. The remaining distance at the time of the red flag was completed.)	Max Verstappen	Crash of Franco Colapinto.	Franco Colapinto	Crash	
2024	São Paulo	32	S	Max Verstappen	Crash of Franco Colapinto.	Nico Hülkenberg	Disqualified	
2026	Monaco	68	R (Note: The race was resumed under the safety car, which led the field for two official laps, before racing resumed with a standing start.)	Kimi Antonelli	Crash of Charles Leclerc and suspected damage to tarmac.	Charles Leclerc	Crash	
2026	Dutch	2	R (Note: The race was resumed under the safety car, which led the field for one official lap. An extra formation lap was used following Oliver Bearman's stoppage, before racing resumed with a standing start.)	Lando Norris	Crash of Max Verstappen, resulting in a damaged barrier and debris on the track.	Max Verstappen	Crash	
2026	Dutch	2	R	Lando Norris	Crash of Max Verstappen, resulting in a damaged barrier and debris on the track.	Oliver Bearman	Engine	
2026	Italian	3	R (Note: The race was resumed under the safety car, which led the field for one official lap. An extra formation lap was used following Yuki Tsunoda's wrong position on the grid, before racing resumed with a standing start.)	Kimi Antonelli	Crash of Charles Leclerc, resulting in a damaged barrier.	Charles Leclerc	Crash	
2026	Mexico City	45	R	Max Verstappen	Crash of Valtteri Bottas, resulting in a damaged barrier.	Valtteri Bottas	Crash	

=== Non-championship races ===
Year	Event	Lap	R	Winner	Incident that prompted red flag	Failed to make the restart		Ref.
Year	Event	Lap	R	Winner	Incident that prompted red flag	Drivers	Reason	Ref.
1971	Brands Hatch	15	N	Peter Gethin	Fatal crash of Jo Siffert.			
