= Michael Latifi =

Canadian businessman (born 1962)

- Born: Mehrdad Latifi; October 1962 (age 63); Imperial State of Iran
- Education: McGill University (BS, MBA)
- Occupations: Businessman, investor, philanthropist
- Years active: 1980–present
- Known for: Sofina Foods, Inc. McLaren Group
- Spouse: Maria Helena Russo
- Relatives: Nicholas Latifi (son)
- Website: www.sofinafoods.com

Michael Mehrdad Latifi (born October 1962) is an Iranian-Canadian billionaire businessman. He is the owner, chairman and CEO of Sofina Foods Inc., a Markham, Ontario-based manufacturer of food products. Sofina acquired Lilydale in a C$130 million deal in 2010, and Santa Maria Foods ULC, an importer and distributor of specialty Italian brands, in 2012. He was born in Iran and migrated to Canada. During his teenage years, he worked at McDonald's. Through the investment company Nidala (BVI) Limited, which is controlled by Latifi, he invested £200 million (c. US$270 million or C$350 million) in McLaren Group.

Michael is the father of racing driver Nicholas Latifi, former driver for the Williams Formula One team.
