= 2022 Japanese Grand Prix =

Eighteenth round of the 2022 F1 season

Race 18 of 22 in the 2022 Formula One World Championship
← Previous race	Next race →
- Layout of the Suzuka International Racing Course

Race details
- Date: 9 October 2022
- Official name: Formula 1 Honda Japanese Grand Prix 2022
- Location: Suzuka International Racing Course; Suzuka, Mie Prefecture, Japan
- Course: Permanent racing facility
- Course length: 5.807 km (3.608 miles)
- Distance: 28 laps, 162.296 km (100.846 miles)
- Scheduled distance: 53 laps, 307.471 km (191.054 miles)
- Weather: Rain
- Attendance: 200,000

Pole position
Driver	(Netherlands) Max Verstappen	Red Bull Racing-RBPT
- Time: 1:29.304

Fastest lap
Driver	(China) Zhou Guanyu	Alfa Romeo-Ferrari
- Time: 1:44.411 on lap 20

Podium
First	(Netherlands) Max Verstappen	Red Bull Racing-RBPT
Second	(Mexico) Sergio Pérez	Red Bull Racing-RBPT
Third	(Monaco) Charles Leclerc	Ferrari

The 2022 Japanese Grand Prix (officially known as the Formula 1 Honda Japanese Grand Prix 2022) was a Formula One motor race held on 9 October 2022 at the Suzuka International Racing Course in Suzuka, Japan. Max Verstappen won the race finishing first, in front of Sergio Pérez and Charles Leclerc.

Despite only 28 of the scheduled 53 laps being completed, full points were awarded due to a loophole in the regulations regarding how points should be allocated, with the rules stating that reduced points should only be awarded in shortened races that end under red flag conditions. The race distance of 53 laps is capped at two hours of racing time or three hours from the start of the race. Because of the red flag delays, when the three hour clock continues to run, the race officially ended under green flag conditions at three hours, similar to sports car races that are capped by time limit, with the wording of sporting regulations declaring the race fully completed by going the entire length of the time limit. The wording of the sporting regulations was subsequently amended for 2023, so races that do not reach the 75 percent distance and concluded by the time limit are awarded shortened race points regardless of whether a race finishes under red or green flag conditions.

Due to the awarding of full points, Max Verstappen was able to secure his second championship title overall.

== Background ==
The event was held across the weekend of the 7–9 October. It was the eighteenth round of the 2022 Formula One World Championship and the first time the event had been held since 2019, with the 2020 and 2021 races cancelled due to the COVID-19 pandemic. Valtteri Bottas entered as the defending race winner.

=== Championship standings before the race ===
Going into the weekend, Max Verstappen led the Drivers' Championship by 104 points from Charles Leclerc, second, and teammate Sergio Pérez, third, by 106. Red Bull Racing team led the Constructors' Championship, leading Ferrari by 137 points and Mercedes by 203 points. For the second race running, Verstappen had an opportunity to secure his second World Drivers' Championship in a row. He needed to outscore Leclerc by eight points and Pérez by six. Verstappen could have won the title as follows:

	Driver		
	(Netherlands) Max Verstappen	(Monaco) Charles Leclerc	(Mexico) Sergio Pérez
Pos.	1st with fastest lap	Position irrelevant	Position irrelevant
Pos.	1st	3rd or lower	Position irrelevant
Pos.	2nd with fastest lap	5th or lower	4th or lower
Pos.	2nd	5th or lower without fastest lap	4th or lower without fastest lap
Pos.	3rd with fastest lap	6th or lower	5th or lower
Pos.	3rd	7th or lower	6th or lower
Pos.	4th with fastest lap	8th or lower	7th or lower
Pos.	4th	8th or lower without fastest lap	7th or lower without fastest lap
Pos.	5th with fastest lap	9th or lower	8th or lower
Pos.	5th	9th without fastest lap or lower	8th or lower without fastest lap
Pos.	6th with fastest lap	10th or lower	9th or lower
Pos.	6th	Out of the points	9th or lower without fastest lap

=== Entrants ===
The drivers and teams were the same as the season entry list with no additional stand-in drivers for the race.

=== Tyre choices ===
Tyre supplier Pirelli brought the C1, C2, and C3 tyre compounds (designated hard, medium, and soft, respectively) for teams to use at the event.

=== Penalties ===
Williams' Nicholas Latifi carried a five-place grid penalty for causing a collision with Zhou Guanyu at the previous round, the Singapore Grand Prix.

== Qualifying ==
After qualifying, Max Verstappen was given a reprimand by stewards for an incident in Q3 involving loss of control of the car requiring Lando Norris to manoeuvre around Verstappen at speed coming out of 130R. There was no grid penalty issued.

=== Qualifying classification ===
Pos.	No.	Driver	Constructor	Qualifying times			Final grid
Pos.	No.	Driver	Constructor	Q1	Q2	Q3	Final grid
1	1	(Netherlands) Max Verstappen	Red Bull Racing-RBPT	1:30.224	1:30.346	1:29.304	1
2	16	(Monaco) Charles Leclerc	Ferrari	1:30.402	1:30.486	1:29.314	2
3	55	(Spain) Carlos Sainz Jr.	Ferrari	1:30.336	1:30.444	1:29.361	3
4	11	(Mexico) Sergio Pérez	Red Bull Racing-RBPT	1:30.622	1:29.925	1:29.709	4
5	31	(France) Esteban Ocon	Alpine-Renault	1:30.696	1:30.357	1:30.165	5
6	44	(United Kingdom) Lewis Hamilton	Mercedes	1:30.906	1:30.443	1:30.261	6
7	14	(Spain) Fernando Alonso	Alpine-Renault	1:30.603	1:30.343	1:30.322	7
8	63	(United Kingdom) George Russell	Mercedes	1:30.865	1:30.465	1:30.389	8
9	5	(Germany) Sebastian Vettel	Aston Martin Aramco-Mercedes	1:31.256	1:30.656	1:30.554	9
10	4	(United Kingdom) Lando Norris	McLaren-Mercedes	1:30.881	1:30.473	1:31.003	10
11	3	(Australia) Daniel Ricciardo	McLaren-Mercedes	1:30.880	1:30.659	N/A	11
12	77	(Finland) Valtteri Bottas	Alfa Romeo-Ferrari	1:31.226	1:30.709	N/A	12
13	22	(Japan) Yuki Tsunoda	AlphaTauri-RBPT	1:31.130	1:30.808	N/A	13
14	24	(China) Zhou Guanyu	Alfa Romeo-Ferrari	1:30.894	1:30.953	N/A	14
15	47	(Germany) Mick Schumacher	Haas-Ferrari	1:31.152	1:31.439	N/A	15
16	23	(Thailand) Alexander Albon	Williams-Mercedes	1:31.311	N/A	N/A	16
17	10	(France) Pierre Gasly	AlphaTauri-RBPT	1:31.322	N/A	N/A	PL^{a}
18	20	(Denmark) Kevin Magnussen	Haas-Ferrari	1:31.352	N/A	N/A	17
19	18	(Canada) Lance Stroll	Aston Martin Aramco-Mercedes	1:31.419	N/A	N/A	18
20	6	(Canada) Nicholas Latifi	Williams-Mercedes	1:31.511	N/A	N/A	19^{b}
107% time: 1:36.539

Notes

- ^a – Pierre Gasly qualified 17th, but he was required to start the race from the pit lane due to modifications to a rear wing assembly, front wing ballast and the setup of the suspension.
- ^b – Nicholas Latifi received a five-place grid penalty for causing a collision with Zhou Guanyu at the previous round. He gained a position as Gasly was required to start the race from the pit lane.

== Race ==
=== Race report ===
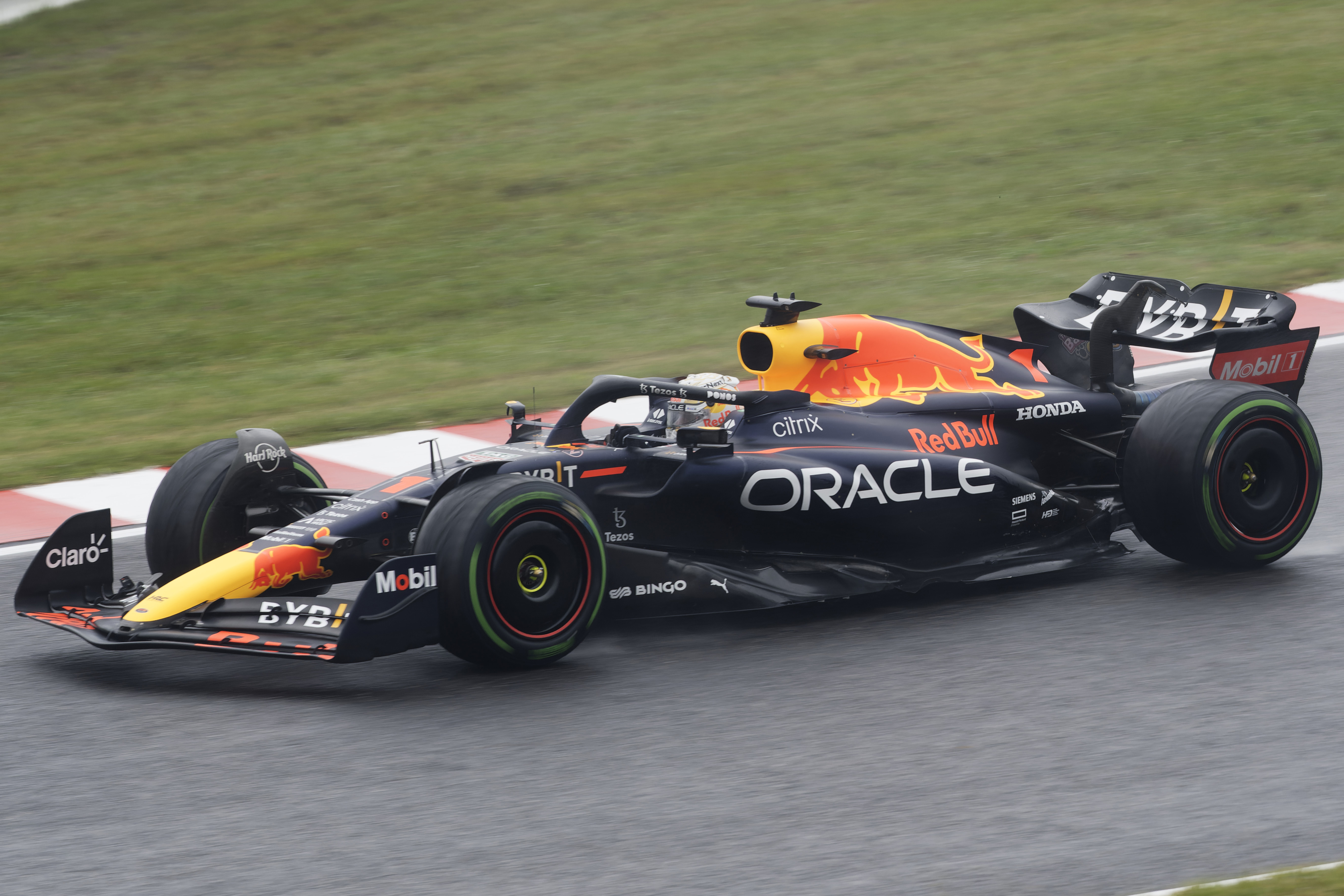
Verstappen secured the 2022 title with a win in Japan, where Honda branding returned to the cars using their power units.

Before the race started, voice actress, singer and narrator Nana Mizuki sang the Japanese national anthem. The race started at 14:00 local time on 9 October 2022 under torrential rain (which was the reason for so many incidents in the race) and was red-flagged on lap 2 after Ferrari driver Carlos Sainz Jr. lost control exiting the hairpin of the opening lap and aquaplaned into the barriers. A recovery vehicle was immediately dispatched, with several drivers passing the tractor at speed under double-yellow flags on the second lap. Alex Albon also retired due to a collision with Kevin Magnussen which caused damage to his radiator.

The race resumed at 16:15 local time behind the safety car. Only twenty-eight laps were completed before the race was curtailed due to it passing the three-hour time limit, with Verstappen taking his twelfth victory of the season. Leclerc, who finished second on track, was given a five-second penalty for cutting the final chicane whilst defending from Pérez in third, which demoted him to third behind Pérez. This, combined with the win, meant that Verstappen took the Championship title, leading Pérez by 113 points and Leclerc by 114 points, with 112 points still available. Nicholas Latifi would also score his final F1 points, before eventually leaving at the end of the 2022 season.

=== Post-race ===
==== Points allocation confusion and clarification ====
As less than 75% of the scheduled race distance had been completed, the majority of the paddock were under the impression that Verstappen would not be awarded full points, Verstappen instead earning 19 points and Leclerc 12, which would have left Verstappen one point short of claiming the championship. Verstappen himself expressed surprise in the cooldown room that full points had been awarded, making him champion.

The confusion regarding the number of points awarded was as a result of a rule change introduced for the 2022 season. Although historically races curtailed on such a scale as this Grand Prix would see half-points awarded, the wording of the new regulation only applied "If a race is suspended and cannot be resumed"; as the race was resumed and completed short, the FIA awarded full points under a strict reading of the regulations, effectively bypassing the gradual scale points system that had been introduced for 2022, following dissatisfaction with how points were allocated at the 2021 Belgian Grand Prix. Red Bull Racing team principal Christian Horner expressed his view that the rule would be revised for the 2023 season to closer match the teams' intentions when the rule was written. In FIA World Endurance Championship competition, for example, the rules state full points are awarded once 75% of the race time was completed, which by the letter of the rule in F1 at the time meant 53 laps or the full race time of three hours. In theory, the race completed the full three hour time limit. Prior to the 2023 championship the F1 Commission agreed to alter the wording of the regulations to ensure all races where less than 75% of the race distance is completed now use the sliding scale system to determine the points being given, regardless of whether they finish under red or green flag conditions. This wording change satisfies the original intention of the gradual scale points system when it was introduced in 2022.

==== Criticism of and investigation into deployment of recovery vehicles ====
The deployment and position of the recovery vehicle on the track was criticised after AlphaTauri driver Pierre Gasly narrowly missed the vehicle due to poor visibility, angrily remonstrated that "[he] could have killed [himself]" if he had lost control and hit the vehicle, even at reduced speed. Gasly also attacked the deployment as "disrespectful" to the memory and family of his childhood friend Jules Bianchi, who suffered fatal injuries at the 2014 Japanese Grand Prix when he crashed into a recovery vehicle after aquaplaning off the circuit. Bianchi's godson Charles Leclerc also said that the sport should learn from Bianchi's death and not have similar issues in the future, and Bianchi's father wrote on Instagram that the race officials had "no respect" for either the life of the drivers or Bianchi's memory. The FIA confirmed there would be an investigation into the deployment of recovery vehicles.

=== Race classification ===
Pos.	No.	Driver	Constructor	Laps^{a}	Time/Retired	Grid	Points
1	1	(Netherlands) Max Verstappen	Red Bull Racing-RBPT	28	3:01:44.004	1	25
2	11	(Mexico) Sergio Pérez	Red Bull Racing-RBPT	28	+27.066	4	18
3	16	(Monaco) Charles Leclerc	Ferrari	28	+31.763^{b}	2	15
4	31	(France) Esteban Ocon	Alpine-Renault	28	+39.685	5	12
5	44	(United Kingdom) Lewis Hamilton	Mercedes	28	+40.326	6	10
6	5	(Germany) Sebastian Vettel	Aston Martin Aramco-Mercedes	28	+46.358	9	8
7	14	(Spain) Fernando Alonso	Alpine-Renault	28	+46.369	7	6
8	63	(United Kingdom) George Russell	Mercedes	28	+47.661	8	4
9	6	(Canada) Nicholas Latifi	Williams-Mercedes	28	+1:10.143	19	2
10	4	(United Kingdom) Lando Norris	McLaren-Mercedes	28	+1:10.782	10	1
11	3	(Australia) Daniel Ricciardo	McLaren-Mercedes	28	+1:12.877	11	
12	18	(Canada) Lance Stroll	Aston Martin Aramco-Mercedes	28	+1:13.904	18	
13	22	(Japan) Yuki Tsunoda	AlphaTauri-RBPT	28	+1:15.599	13	
14	20	(Denmark) Kevin Magnussen	Haas-Ferrari	28	+1:26.016	17	
15	77	(Finland) Valtteri Bottas	Alfa Romeo-Ferrari	28	+1:26.496	12	
16	24	(China) Zhou Guanyu	Alfa Romeo-Ferrari	28	+1:27.043	14	
17	47	(Germany) Mick Schumacher	Haas-Ferrari	28	+1:32.523	15	
18	10	(France) Pierre Gasly	AlphaTauri-RBPT	28	+1:48.091^{c}	PL	
Ret	55	(Spain) Carlos Sainz Jr.	Ferrari	0	Accident	3	
Ret	23	(Thailand) Alexander Albon	Williams-Mercedes	0	Collision damage	16	
Fastest lap: (China) Zhou Guanyu (Alfa Romeo-Ferrari) – 1:44.411 (lap 20)

Notes

- ^a – The race distance was initially scheduled to be completed for 53 laps before being shortened due to a red flag.
- ^b – Charles Leclerc finished second, but he received a five-second time penalty for leaving the track and gaining an advantage.
- ^c – Pierre Gasly finished 17th, but he received a drive-through penalty (converted to a 20-second time penalty post-race) for speeding under red flag conditions.

== FIA investigation ==
On 21 October 2022, the FIA published its review into the Grand Prix with the FIA's report recognising that the deployment of the recovery vehicle could have been handled better.

The FIA is due to implement a warning system of recovery vehicles on track. The FIA stated that the VSC system would be improved so that the drivers speed limit could vary depending on where the car is in relation to the site of any on-track incident. In addition the FIA said it would look into further improvements to the full wet weather tyres and to circuit's drainage capabilities. The FIA abandoned the idea of rotating race directors, leaving Niels Wittich as the sole serving race director for the final four rounds of the championship. The rotation policy was not met with favourable reviews from drivers, as well as being in response to criticism of Eduardo Freitas' performance as race director at this event.

== Championship standings after the race ==
Drivers' Championship standings

	Pos.	Driver	Points
	1	(Netherlands) **Max Verstappen**	366
1	2	(Mexico) Sergio Pérez	253
1	3	(Monaco) Charles Leclerc	252
	4	(United Kingdom) George Russell	207
	5	(Spain) Carlos Sainz Jr.	202

Constructors' Championship standings

	Pos.	Constructor	Points
	1	(Austria) **Red Bull Racing-RBPT***	619
	2	(Italy) **Ferrari***	454
	3	(Germany) Mercedes	387
1	4	(France) Alpine-Renault	143
1	5	(United Kingdom) McLaren-Mercedes	130

- Note: Only the top five positions are included for both sets of standings.
- Competitor in bold indicates the 2022 World Drivers' Champion.
- Competitor in bold and marked with an asterisk still had a theoretical chance of becoming World Champion.

== See also ==
- 2014 Japanese Grand Prix, which saw Jules Bianchi fatally crash into a recovery vehicle.

Previous race: 2022 Singapore Grand Prix	FIA Formula One World Championship; 2022 season	Next race: 2022 United States Grand Prix
Previous race: 2019 Japanese Grand Prix	Japanese Grand Prix	Next race: 2023 Japanese Grand Prix
