= 2022 United States Grand Prix =

Nineteenth round of the 2022 F1 season

Race 19 of 22 in the 2022 Formula One World Championship
← Previous race	Next race →
- Layout of the Circuit of the Americas

Race details
- Date: October 23, 2022
- Official name: Formula 1 Aramco United States Grand Prix 2022
- Location: Circuit of the Americas; Austin, Texas, United States
- Course: Permanent racing facility
- Course length: 5.513 km (3.426 miles)
- Distance: 56 laps, 308.405 km (191.634 miles)
- Weather: Partly cloudy
- Attendance: 440,000

Pole position
Driver	(Spain) Carlos Sainz Jr.	Ferrari
- Time: 1:34.356

Fastest lap
Driver	(United Kingdom) George Russell	Mercedes
- Time: 1:38.788 on lap 56

Podium
First	(Netherlands) Max Verstappen	Red Bull Racing-RBPT
Second	(United Kingdom) Lewis Hamilton	Mercedes
Third	(Monaco) Charles Leclerc	Ferrari

The 2022 United States Grand Prix (officially known as the Formula 1 Aramco United States Grand Prix 2022) was a Formula One motor race, held on October 23, 2022, at the Circuit of the Americas in Austin, Texas, United States. The race was the 19th round of the 2022 Formula One World Championship and the 51st running of the United States Grand Prix, the 43rd time the race was run as a World Championship event since the inaugural 1950 season, and the tenth time a World Championship round was held at the Circuit of the Americas in Austin, Texas.

It was won by defending champion Max Verstappen, who was followed by Lewis Hamilton in second and Charles Leclerc in third. With Verstappen taking victory and teammate Sergio Pérez finishing fourth, Red Bull secured its fifth Constructors' Championship title and the first since 2013.

== Background ==
The event was held across the weekend of October 21–23. It was the nineteenth round of the 2022 Formula One World Championship. Max Verstappen entered the race as the defending winner.

=== Championship standings before the race ===
Going into the weekend, Max Verstappen had secured his second consecutive Drivers' Championship at the previous round, the Japanese Grand Prix. He led by 113 points from teammate Sergio Pérez, second, and Charles Leclerc, third, by 114. Red Bull Racing team led the Constructors' Championship from Ferrari by 165 points and Mercedes by 232 points. Red Bull Racing could have secured their fifth World Constructors' Championship, and first since 2013, if Ferrari would not outscore them by 19 points.

=== Entrants ===
The drivers and teams were the same as the season entry list with no additional stand-in drivers for the race. Four drivers made their Formula One practice debuts in the first practice session: Logan Sargeant in place of Nicholas Latifi at Williams, Robert Shwartzman in place of Charles Leclerc at Ferrari, Théo Pourchaire in place of Valtteri Bottas at Alfa Romeo, and 2021 IndyCar Series driver's champion Álex Palou in place of Daniel Ricciardo at McLaren. Antonio Giovinazzi drove for Haas in the same session in place of Kevin Magnussen.

=== Tyre choices ===
Tyre supplier Pirelli brought the C2, C3, and C4 tyre compounds (designated hard, medium, and soft, respectively) for teams to use at the event.

== Qualifying ==
=== Qualifying classification ===
Pos.	No.	Driver	Constructor	Qualifying times			Final grid
Pos.	No.	Driver	Constructor	Q1	Q2	Q3	Final grid
1	55	(Spain) Carlos Sainz Jr.	Ferrari	1:35.297	1:35.590	1:34.356	1
2	16	(Monaco) Charles Leclerc	Ferrari	1:35.795	1:35.246	1:34.421	12^{a}
3	1	(Netherlands) Max Verstappen	Red Bull Racing-RBPT	1:35.864	1:35.294	1:34.448	2
4	11	(Mexico) Sergio Pérez	Red Bull Racing-RBPT	1:36.163	1:35.864	1:34.645	9^{b}
5	44	(United Kingdom) Lewis Hamilton	Mercedes	1:36.148	1:35.732	1:34.947	3
6	63	(United Kingdom) George Russell	Mercedes	1:36.195	1:35.692	1:34.988	4
7	18	(Canada) Lance Stroll	Aston Martin Aramco-Mercedes	1:36.860	1:36.032	1:35.598	5
8	4	(United Kingdom) Lando Norris	McLaren-Mercedes	1:36.465	1:36.341	1:35.690	6
9	14	(Spain) Fernando Alonso	Alpine-Renault	1:36.446	1:35.988	1:35.876	14^{b}
10	77	(Finland) Valtteri Bottas	Alfa Romeo-Ferrari	1:36.746	1:36.321	1:36.319	7
11	23	(Thailand) Alexander Albon	Williams-Mercedes	1:36.932	1:36.368	N/A	8
12	5	(Germany) Sebastian Vettel	Aston Martin Aramco-Mercedes	1:36.695	1:36.398	N/A	10
13	10	(France) Pierre Gasly	AlphaTauri-RBPT	1:36.577	1:36.740	N/A	11
14	24	(China) Zhou Guanyu	Alfa Romeo-Ferrari	1:36.656	1:36.970	N/A	18^{b}
15	22	(Japan) Yuki Tsunoda	AlphaTauri-RBPT	1:36.808	1:37.147	N/A	19^{c}
16	20	(Denmark) Kevin Magnussen	Haas-Ferrari	1:36.949	N/A	N/A	13
17	3	(Australia) Daniel Ricciardo	McLaren-Mercedes	1:37.046	N/A	N/A	15
18	31	(France) Esteban Ocon	Alpine-Renault	1:37.068	N/A	N/A	PL^{d}
19	47	(Germany) Mick Schumacher	Haas-Ferrari	1:37.111	N/A	N/A	16
20	6	(Canada) Nicholas Latifi	Williams-Mercedes	1:37.244	N/A	N/A	17
107% time: 1:41.968

Notes

- ^a – Charles Leclerc received a ten-place grid penalty for exceeding his quota of power unit elements.
- ^b – Sergio Pérez, Zhou Guanyu and Fernando Alonso received a five-place grid penalty for exceeding their quota of power unit elements. Zhou gained a position following Yuki Tsunoda's penalty.
- ^c – Yuki Tsunoda received a five-place grid penalty for a new gearbox driveline.
- ^d – Esteban Ocon qualified 17th, but he was required to start the race from the back of the grid for exceeding his quota of power unit elements. The new power unit elements were changed while the car was under parc fermé without the permission of the technical delegate. He was therefore required to start the race from the pit lane.

== Race ==
=== Race report ===
Before the race, drivers, staff and spectators held a moment of silence in memory of Red Bull owner Dietrich Mateschitz, who died on Saturday, and the music of his favorite band, The Rolling Stones, was played at the event.

The race started on time, with all the cars on medium tyres, except for both Alpines and both Haas. Esteban Ocon started from the pitlane.

At the first corner of the race, Carlos Sainz got hit by George Russell who locked up and crashed into the Spaniard. Sainz initially falling to 19th, pitted at the end of that first lap to retire. Russell, still in 4th, got a 5 second penalty. At the front, Verstappen had a good start and took the lead, with Hamilton and Stroll completing the top three. At the back, Sebastian Vettel and Yuki Tsunoda made 5 positions. In the following laps, Perez made his way through the field with a damaged front wing, reaching 4th in lap 6. Leclerc tried to follow but could not clear the Aston Martins until lap 14.

First set of pitstops began with Alex Albon and Zhou Guanyu on lap 10. They were followed by Bottas the next lap, in an attempt to undercut both Norris and Gasly, after fighting for multiple laps. However a slow pitstop for Bottas kept him behind Gasly and Norris chose to extend. The first car to stop in the top three was Hamilton, lap 13, followed by Verstappen and Russell the next lap. Verstappen was able to exit in front of eveyone but his team mate, who inherited the lead, while Hamilton ended up behind both Aston Martins and Leclerc. After serving his penalty, Russell rejoined in 9th. Perez pitted the following lap, but only changed tyres, as the team decided that the damaged wing was in a good enough condition to continue.

On lap 18, Bottas spun and got beached in the gravel, which brought out the Safety Car. This helped both Leclerc and Vettel, who were on the medium tyres yet to pit; but also both Alpines and both Haas took the opportunity. Alex Albon and Latifi, decided to take their second pitstop at this point as well. At the end of the Safety Car, top five were Verstappen, Hamilton, Perez, Leclerc and Russell.

On lap 22, Alonso hit Stroll trying to overtake him, which propelled Alonso in the air and brought out the Safety Car again. Alonso had to pit but was able to continue, while Stroll had to retire. Gasly received a 5 second penalty for dropping more than 10 car lengths behind during the Safety Car, but failed to serve it, so he was given an additional 10 second penalty.

By the time DRS was enabled, only Charles Leclerc was within DRS range in the top 5, eventually overtaking Perez. The second round of pitstops at the front began with Hamilton, and was followed by Verstappen and Leclerc, the former getting a slow stop (11 seconds) that dropped him behind both. Verstappen overtook Leclerc by lap 39, and Hamilton by lap 50. Meanwhile, Perez and Russell were battling as well, briefly switching positions after their stops, but Perez was able to recover 4th swiftly. However, since they were both carrying front wing damage, they couldn't challenge for the top 3.

Further behind, Norris was able to get 6th after damage from the Stroll-Alonso crash, Alonso was able to recover from the back to 7th, and Vettel -who was the lead at one point and dropped to 13th after a slow stop (almost 17 seconds)- was able to recover to 8th. Magnussen and Tsunoda completed the point scorers.

With Verstappen winning the race and Perez clinching 4th, Red Bull Racing claimed the Constructors Championship.

=== Post-race ===
Lance Stroll receive a 3-place grid penalty for his crash with Fernando Alonso, stewards found he had moved too late causing the collision. The penalty was carried to the following race in Mexico.

=== Race classification ===
Pos.	No.	Driver	Constructor	Laps	Time/Retired	Grid	Points
1	1	(Netherlands) Max Verstappen	Red Bull Racing-RBPT	56	1:42:11.687	2	25
2	44	(United Kingdom) Lewis Hamilton	Mercedes	56	+5.023	3	18
3	16	(Monaco) Charles Leclerc	Ferrari	56	+7.501	12	15
4	11	(Mexico) Sergio Pérez	Red Bull Racing-RBPT	56	+8.293	9	12
5	63	(United Kingdom) George Russell	Mercedes	56	+44.815	4	11^{a}
6	4	(United Kingdom) Lando Norris	McLaren-Mercedes	56	+53.785	6	8
7	14	(Spain) Fernando Alonso	Alpine-Renault	56	+55.078	14	6
8	5	(Germany) Sebastian Vettel	Aston Martin Aramco-Mercedes	56	+1:05.354	10	4
9	20	(Denmark) Kevin Magnussen	Haas-Ferrari	56	+1:05.834	13	2
10	22	(Japan) Yuki Tsunoda	AlphaTauri-RBPT	56	+1:10.919	19	1
11	31	(France) Esteban Ocon	Alpine-Renault	56	+1:12.875	PL	
12	24	(China) Zhou Guanyu	Alfa Romeo-Ferrari	56	+1:16.164	18	
13	23	(Thailand) Alexander Albon	Williams-Mercedes	56	+1:20.075^{b}	8	
14	10	(France) Pierre Gasly	AlphaTauri-RBPT	56	+1:21.763^{c}	11	
15	47	(Germany) Mick Schumacher	Haas-Ferrari	56	+1:24.490^{d}	16	
16	3	(Australia) Daniel Ricciardo	McLaren-Mercedes	56	+1:30.487	15	
17	6	(Canada) Nicholas Latifi	Williams-Mercedes	56	+1:43.588^{e}	17	
Ret	18	(Canada) Lance Stroll	Aston Martin Aramco-Mercedes	21	Collision	5	
Ret	77	(Finland) Valtteri Bottas	Alfa Romeo-Ferrari	16	Spun off	7	
Ret	55	(Spain) Carlos Sainz Jr.	Ferrari	1	Collision damage	1	
Fastest lap: (United Kingdom) George Russell (Mercedes) – 1:38.788 (lap 56)
Source::

Notes

- ^a – Includes one point for fastest lap.
- ^b – Alexander Albon finished 13th, but he received a five-second time penalty for leaving the track and gaining an advantage. His final position was not affected by the penalty.
- ^c – Pierre Gasly finished 11th, but he received a ten-second time penalty for failing to serve a penalty following a safety car infringement.
- ^d – Mick Schumacher received a five-second time penalty for exceeding track limits. His final position was not affected by the penalty.
- ^e – Nicholas Latifi received a five-second time penalty for forcing Mick Schumacher off the track. His final position was not affected by the penalty.

== Championship standings after the race ==
Drivers' Championship standings

	Pos.	Driver	Points
	1	(Netherlands) **Max Verstappen**	391
1	2	(Monaco) Charles Leclerc	267
1	3	(Mexico) Sergio Pérez	265
	4	(United Kingdom) George Russell	218
	5	(Spain) Carlos Sainz Jr.	202

Constructors' Championship standings

Pos.	Constructor	Points
1	(Austria) **Red Bull Racing-RBPT**	656
2	(Italy) Ferrari	469
3	(Germany) Mercedes	416
4	(France) Alpine-Renault	149
5	(United Kingdom) McLaren-Mercedes	138

- Note: Only the top five positions are included for both sets of standings.
- Competitors in bold are the 2022 World Champions.

Previous race: 2022 Japanese Grand Prix	FIA Formula One World Championship; 2022 season	Next race: 2022 Mexico City Grand Prix
Previous race: 2021 United States Grand Prix	United States Grand Prix	Next race: 2023 United States Grand Prix
