= Nicholas Latifi =

Canadian racing driver (born 1995)

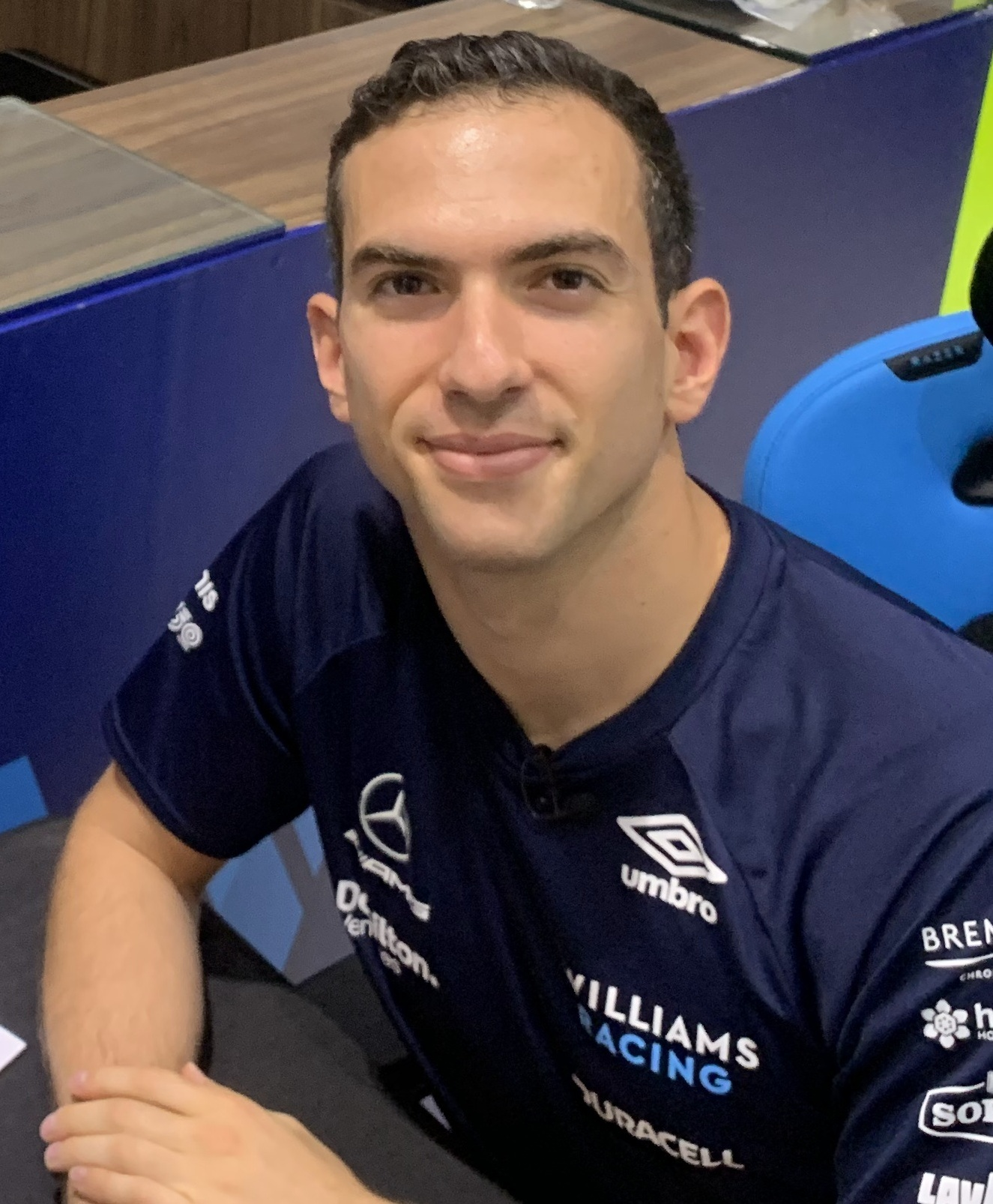
- Latifi at the 2022 Singapore Grand Prix
- Born: Nicholas Daniel Latifi; 29 June 1995 (age 31); Montreal, Quebec, Canada
- Parent: Michael Latifi (father)

Formula One World Championship career
- Nationality: (Canada) Canadian
- Active years: 2020–2022
- Team: Williams
- Car number: 6
- Entries: 61
- Championships: 0
- Wins: 0
- Podiums: 0
- Career points: 9
- Pole positions: 0
- Fastest laps: 0
- First entry: 2020 Austrian Grand Prix
- Last entry: 2022 Abu Dhabi Grand Prix

Previous series
- 2017–2019; 2014–2016; 2014–2015; 2014–2015; 2013–2014; 2013; 2013; 2012: FIA Formula 2; GP2 Series; Formula Renault 3.5; Porsche Carrera Cup GB; FIA F3 European; Toyota Racing Series; British F3; Italian F3
- Website: nicholaslatifi.com

Nicholas Daniel Latifi (/ˈlətiːfiː/; born 29 June 1995) is a Canadian former racing driver who competed in Formula One from 2020 to 2022.

Born in Montreal and raised in Toronto, Latifi is the son of Iranian-Canadian billionaire businessman Michael Latifi. Graduating from karting to junior formulae in 2012, Latifi made his racing debut in the Italian Formula Three Championship. He achieved his highest Formula Three finish at the 2013 British International Series, finishing fifth with Carlin. Making his GP2 Series debut in 2014, Latifi achieved a full-time drive for DAMS in 2016. After four full seasons in GP2—now known as the FIA Formula 2 Championship—Latifi finished runner-up to Nyck de Vries in 2019.

Latifi served as a test driver for Renault from 2016 to 2017, and as a reserve driver for Force India—later known as Racing Point—in 2018. A member of the Williams Driver Academy since 2019, Latifi signed for Williams in 2020 to partner George Russell, making his Formula One debut at the Austrian Grand Prix, where he finished 11th. After a non-scoring season with the FW43, Latifi scored his maiden points finish at the Hungarian Grand Prix in 2021, repeating this feat in Belgium. Retaining his seat for 2022, Latifi finished ninth at the rain-affected Japanese Grand Prix. Latifi was replaced by Logan Sargeant at the conclusion of the season, marking the end of his Formula One career.

== Early and personal life ==
Nicholas Daniel Latifi was born on 29 June 1995 in Montreal, Quebec, and grew up in North York, Toronto. He is the son of Michael Latifi, an Iranian-Canadian billionaire businessman who is the CEO of Sofina Foods, Inc. and also owns the British Virgin Islands company Nidala. His mother, Marilena Latifi (née Russo), an Italian-Canadian with Sicilian parents, was born into the Saputo family, which founded the dairy company Saputo Inc. Latifi has three siblings: Sophia, Michael Alexander (a voice actor), and Matthew. His car number, 6, references a nickname of his home city, Toronto.

Latifi attended Crescent School, an independent boys' school, graduating in 2013. He was named to the school's Alumni Wall of Honour in 2021. Because of his heavy racing schedule, he spent most of his high school years attending school remotely.

Latifi was a relative latecomer to motorsport and had a long junior career. He began karting at the age of thirteen. He then spent four years karting and eight years in junior formulae. As a result, he joined Formula One at the age of 24, which he said was "definitely on the older side."

After leaving Formula One, Latifi decided to quit motorsport altogether and enrolled at London Business School in 2023, to study for a Master of Business Administration (MBA). He completed his MBA program after two years of study and in 2025 announced his graduation. In the same year, he co-founded Leve Agave Spirit, a mid-strength (22% ABV) agave spirit brand that launched in the UK in 2025.

== Junior racing career ==
=== Karting ===
Latifi began his karting career in 2009. In 2010, he finished as the runner-up in the Rotax Junior class of the Canadian National Karting Championship. Latifi continued competing in Canadian and American karting series until 2012, when he won the Florida Winter Tour championship in the Rotax DD2 class. He later made an appearance in the Shifter ROK class of the Florida Winter Tour in 2015, competing against former Formula One drivers Rubens Barrichello and Nelson Piquet Jr.

=== Formula Three and Renault 3.5 ===
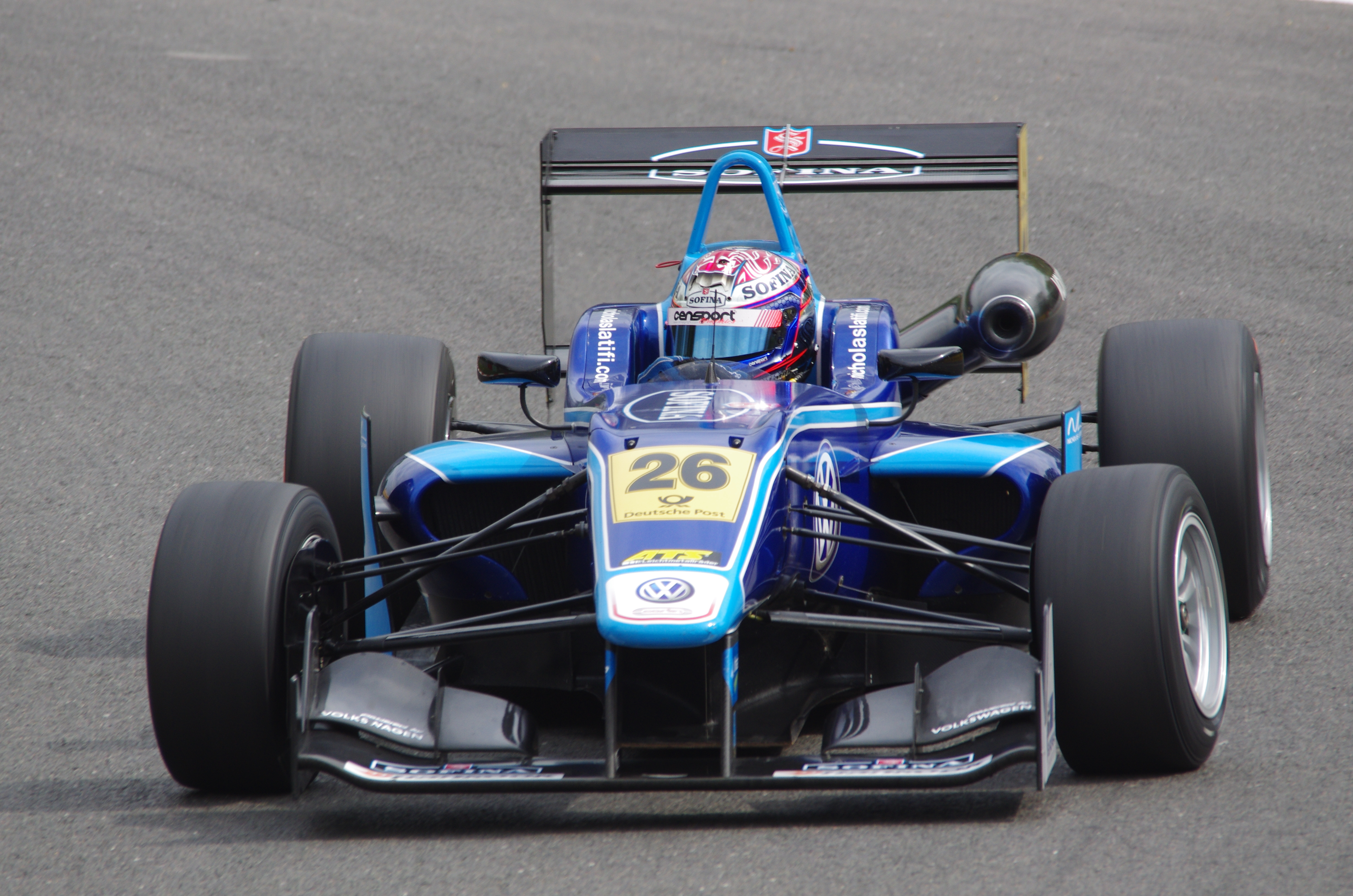
Latifi racing in the 2013 European Formula 3 Championship

Latifi spent four years in various European Formula Three competitions. He made his single-seater debut in the 2012 Italian Formula Three Championship with BVM, placing seventh with one win and four podiums.

In 2013, Latifi started the year in the Toyota Racing Series (Giles Motorsport), an early-season warm-up competition. He finished ninth. He then concurrently competed in the FIA Formula 3 European Championship and the British Formula 3 International Series, both with Carlin. He placed 15th in European Formula Three and fifth in British Formula Three, and took a podium in the latter competition at Brands Hatch. He also placed seventh at the 2013 Masters of Formula 3 race at Zandvoort.

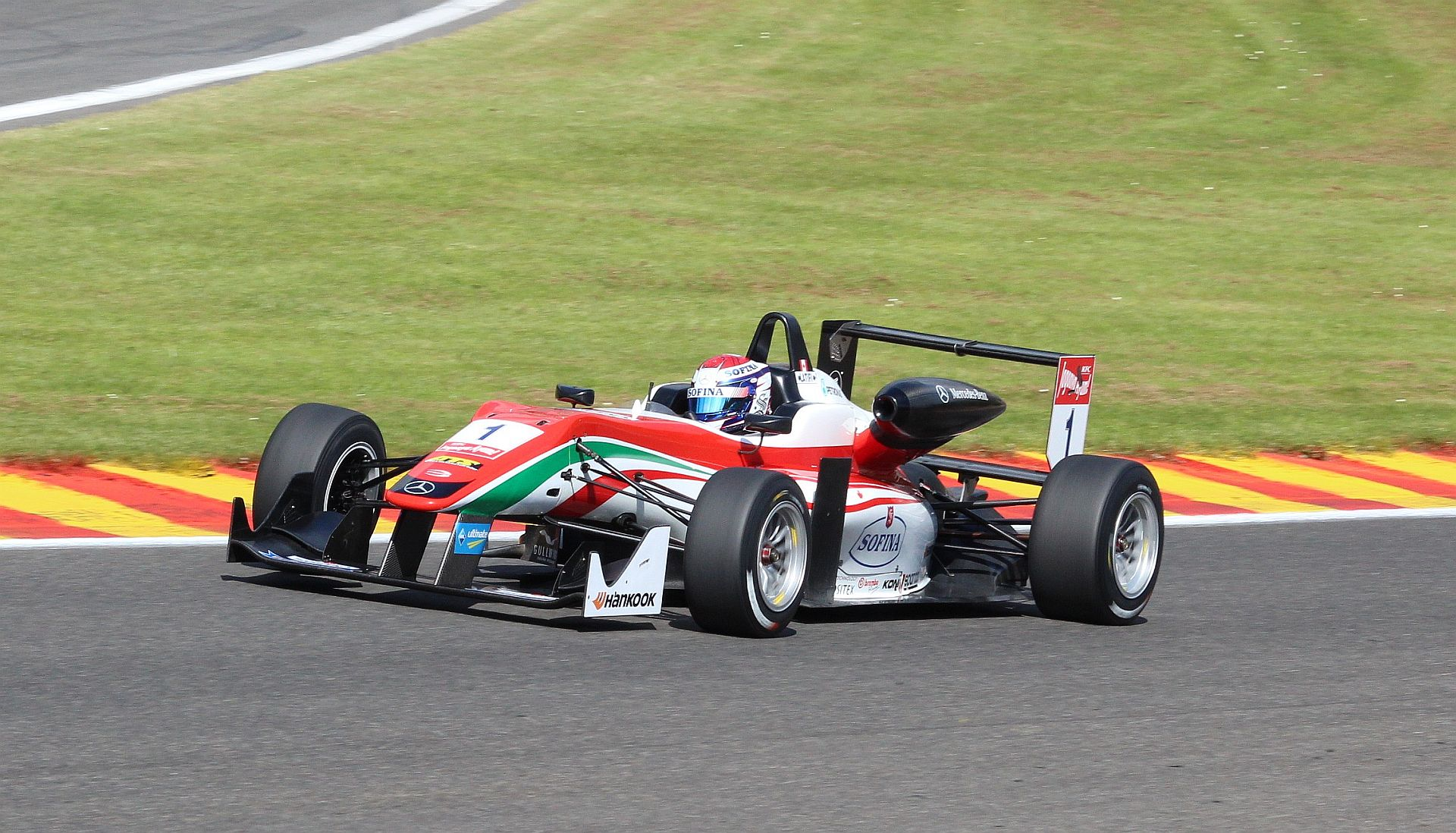
Latifi racing for Prema Powerteam at Spa in the 2014 European Formula 3 Championship

2014 was a busy year for Latifi, who competed in 53 races across six competitions. In his sophomore European F3 campaign, he switched to Prema Powerteam and finished tenth. Although he competed against future F1 drivers Esteban Ocon and Max Verstappen, he scored a second-place finish at Silverstone and six top-five finishes. He skipped the final round of the season to compete in Formula Renault 3.5 with Tech 1 Racing, scoring a second-place finish at Jerez in the final race of the season. In November, he competed in the Macau Grand Prix, finishing fifth in the feature race.

In 2015, Latifi joined Formula Renault 3.5 full-time, spending the 2015 season with Arden Motorsport. He finished 11th, with his best finishes being two fourth-place results at Spa and at Spielberg.

=== Sportscar racing ===
Latifi competed in the 2012 Continental Tire Sports Car Challenge for Rehagen Racing, driving a Ford Mustang GT. In 2014, he made an appearance in the Porsche Carrera Cup Great Britain driving for Redline Racing at Rockingham. He retired from the first round but scored a fourth-place finish in the second round. He had a longer campaign in 2015, competing in four of the eight rounds and taking second place in the first race at Oulton Park. He finished 11th in the standings.

=== GP2 / FIA Formula 2 ===
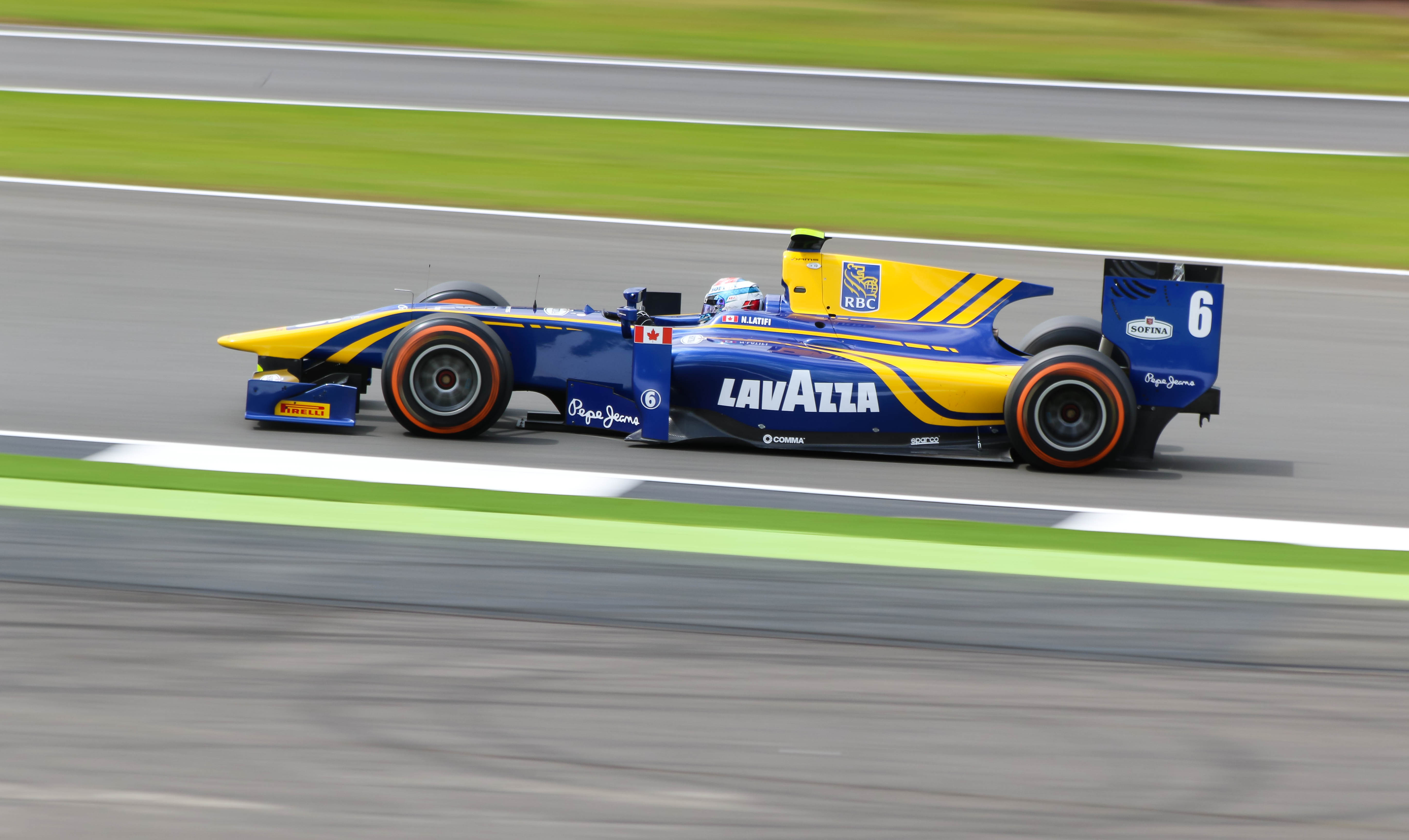
Latifi in the 2016 GP2 Series

From 2016 to 2019, Latifi spent four full seasons in the GP2 Series and its successor, FIA Formula 2, all with the DAMS team. He also participated in cameos in 2014 and 2015.

==== 2014–2016: Early campaigns in GP2 ====
Latifi joined GP2 for two races in 2014, replacing Hilmer Motorsport's Daniel Abt, who dropped out due to Formula E commitments. He placed 22nd and 17th. In 2015, he competed in eight races with MP Motorsport, with a best finish of 11th at Sakhir. In 2016, Latifi joined GP2 full-time with DAMS, but had a difficult season and finished 16th, 101 points behind teammate Alex Lynn. He scored three points finishes, including a podium at the season opener in Barcelona. However, he set the fastest time in post-season testing.

==== 2017–2018: Maiden victories ====
Latifi remained in the category as it rebranded to the FIA Formula 2 Championship in 2017. He led most of the Barcelona sprint race, but lost the lead after running wide through the gravel, and settled for third. He picked up his maiden F2 race win at the Silverstone sprint race, when he started third, grabbed the lead at the start, and dominated the rest of the race. At Monza, he fought his way back from 14th to third during the rain-affected feature race. He placed fifth in the championship with 178 points, thirteen points behind teammate Oliver Rowland. For the year, he collected one win and nine podiums in 22 races. Motorsport.com ranked him the No. 14 junior single-seater driver of 2017, predicting that he could be "a genuine threat for the title" in 2018.

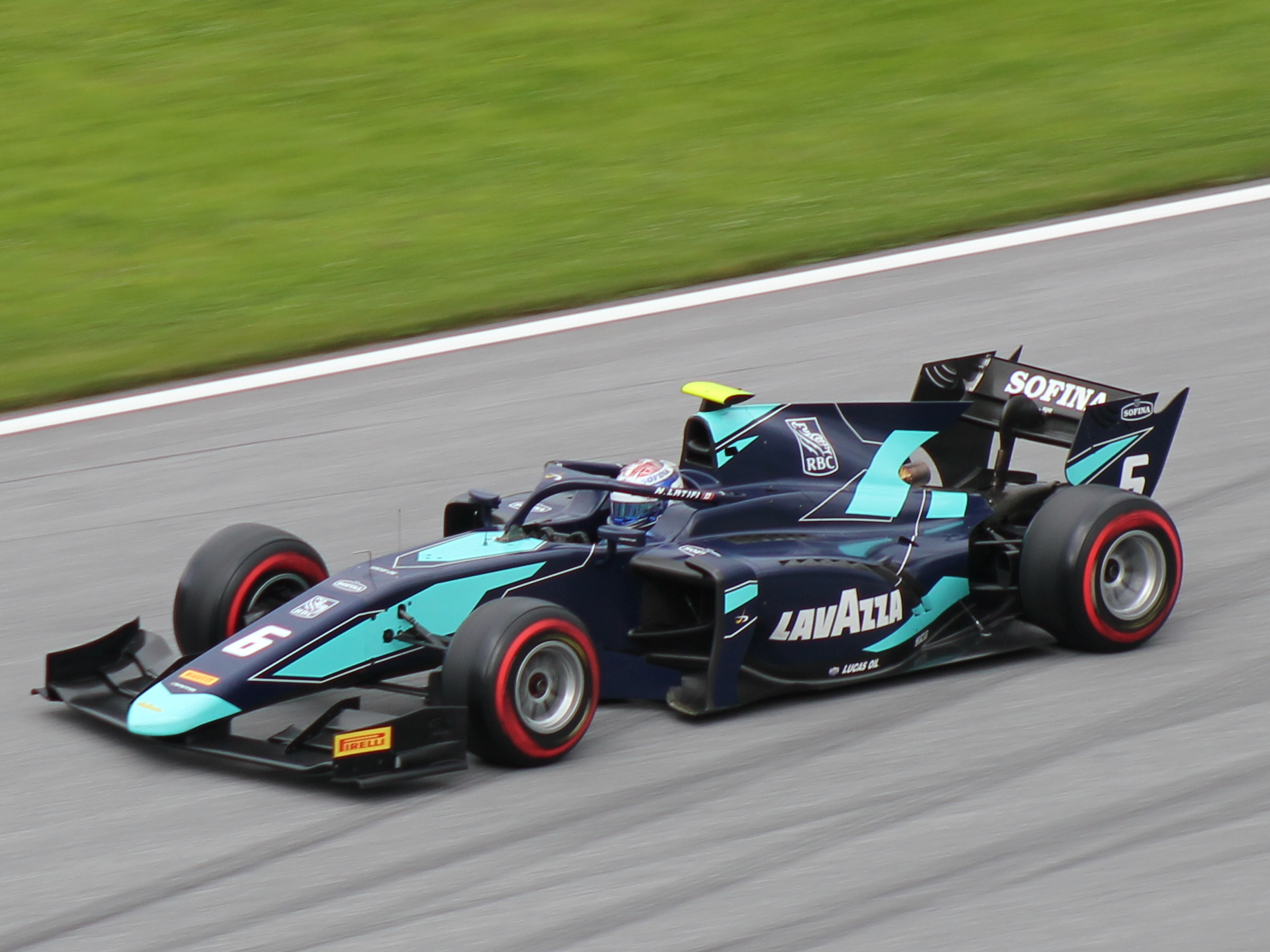
Latifi racing in Austria in the 2018 Formula 2 Championship.

Latifi took a step back in 2018, when a new F2 car was introduced. He opined that the new car was poorly suited to his driving style and that he was forced to "change pretty much everything I know about driving, all my natural instincts." He was hampered by qualifying issues and occasionally chaotic race starts, but mounted notable recovery drives at Bahrain (pit lane to tenth), Baku (last to fifth), Monaco (18th to ninth), Paul Ricard (17th to seventh), and Spielberg (19th to 11th). All together, he scored three podiums and one win at Spa-Francorchamps, and finished the season in ninth place with 91 points, 121 points behind third-placed teammate (and future F1 teammate) Alex Albon. At the end of the season, PaddockScout opined that "once Latifi got up to speed with the new car, he wasn't far off [Albon's pace], outqualifying him in two of the last three rounds," and predicted a bounce-back season in 2019. Latifi joined the Williams Driver Academy at the end of the season.

==== 2019: Runner-up in final season ====
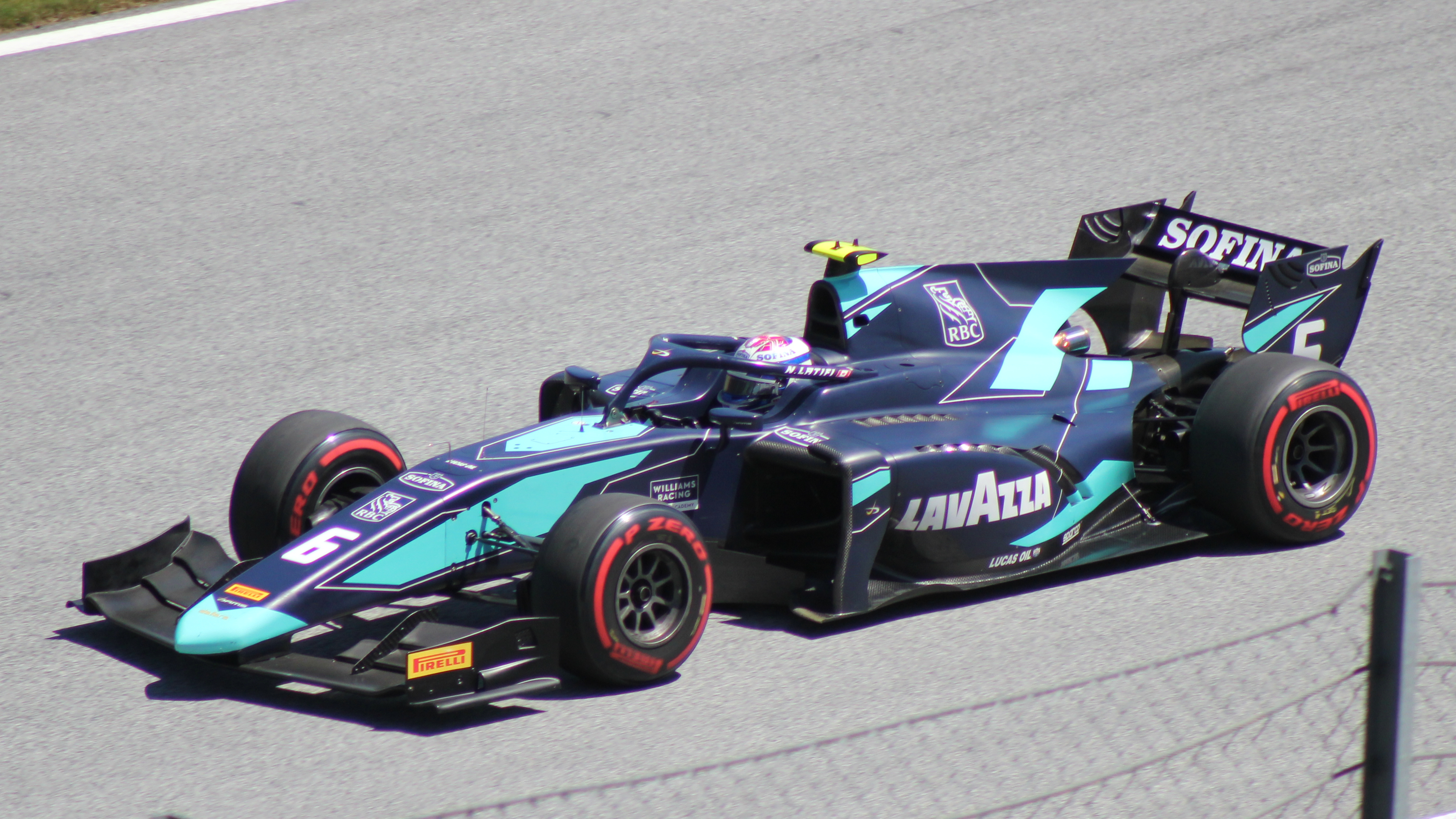
Latifi at the 2019 Spielberg Formula 2 round in Austria

In 2019, Latifi got off to an excellent start and challenged for the F2 title for much of the year. He won the first feature race at Sakhir, led the championship after the second round in Baku after winning the sprint race, and won the feature race at Barcelona. However, he lost the title lead to Nyck de Vries after a difficult showing at Monaco (during which Latifi was erroneously placed one lap down during a re-start) and a de Vries win at Paul Ricard. He did not score a podium finish until the feature race at Silverstone, where he finished second. He dominated the feature race win at Hungary, but de Vries finished second to keep him at arm's-length in the title race.

A cancelled weekend at Spa-Francorchamps (due to the death of Anthoine Hubert) and a point-less weekend at Monza effectively ended Latifi's title fight, with the Canadian admitting that he would "focus on consolidating second in the championship". He held on to second place with two second-place finishes in the final four races. Before the season finale at Yas Marina, Williams promoted him to Formula One for the 2020 season. Latifi scored four wins, eight podiums, and four fastest laps to end the season in second place with 214 points, ten points ahead of teammate Sérgio Sette Câmara. In addition, DAMS won its first GP2/F2 title since 2014. Formula Scout ranked Latifi as the No. 10 junior single-seater driver of 2019, and the No. 5 racer in F2.

== Formula One career ==
Latifi tested for Renault in 2016 and 2017. In May 2016, he drove a F1 car for the first time when he tested the Renault-powered Lotus E20 (Renault had recently repurchased the Lotus F1 Team) at Silverstone. In 2017, he drove the Renault R.S.17 at Barcelona and the Hungaroring.

In 2018, Latifi became Force India's reserve and test driver. In this capacity, he participated in his first F1 race weekend, driving in a practice session in Montreal. He also joined several other F1 practice sessions during the season, and tested the Force India VJM11 twice.

After signing for the Williams Driver Academy, Latifi became Williams' test and reserve driver for 2019. He made his testing debut with Williams at Sakhir, and continued testing during and after the season. He also participated in six FP1 sessions.

=== Williams (2020–2022) ===
==== Bankruptcy scare ====
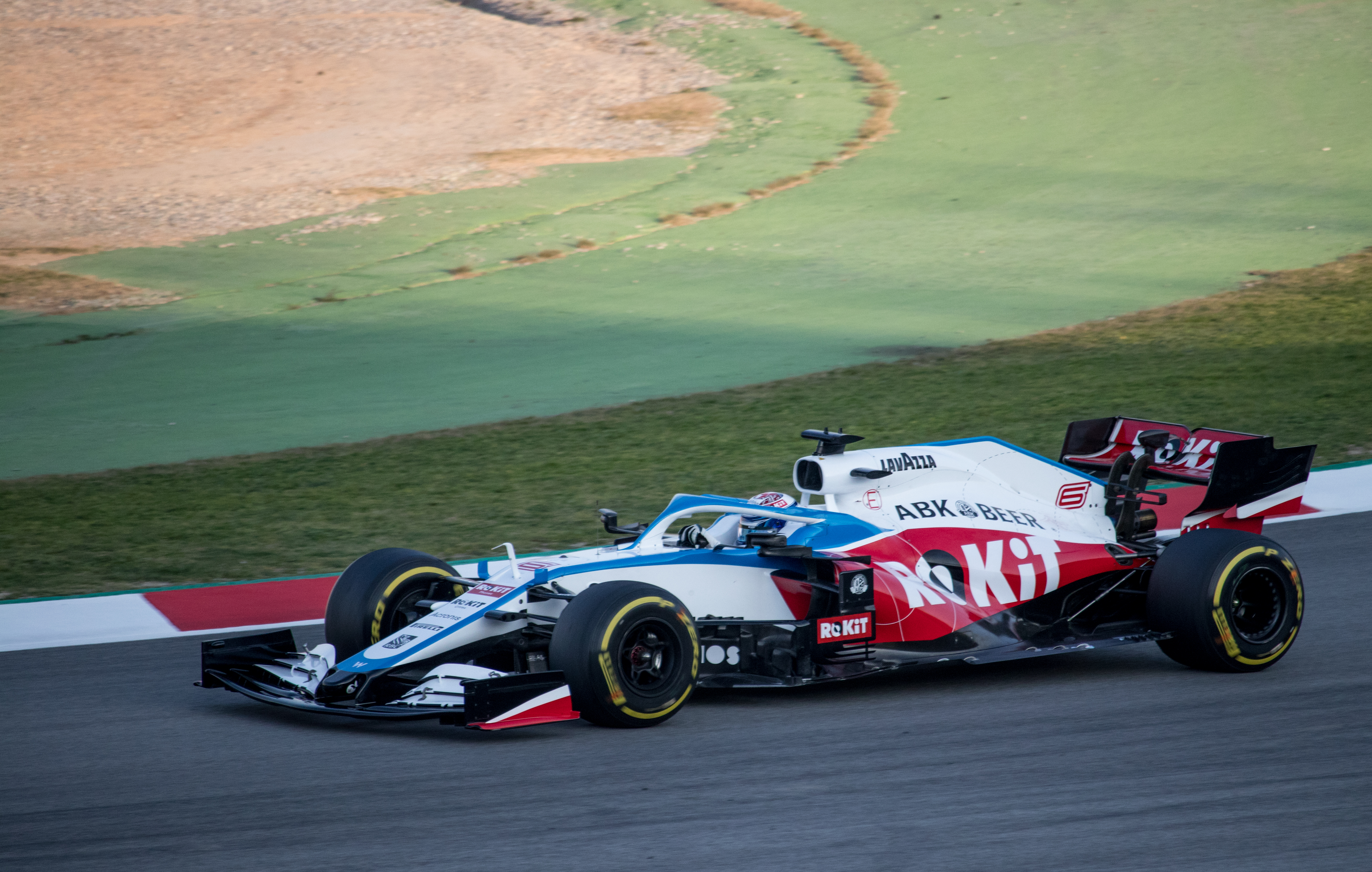
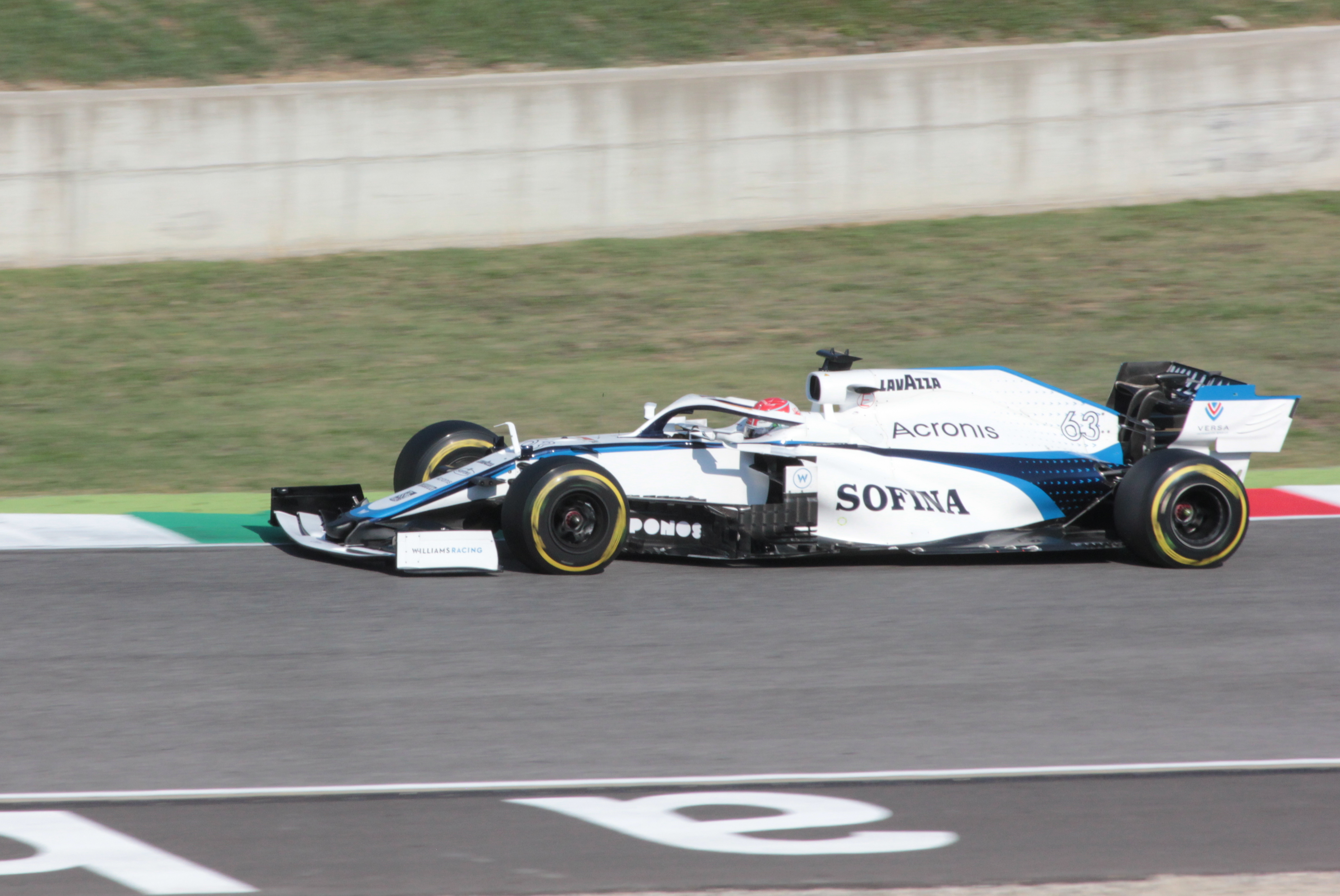
Williams terminated its title sponsorship deal with ROKiT before the start of the 2020 season. The Williams FW43's livery (original at left, driven by Latifi during pre-season testing) was redesigned to more prominently feature Latifi's sponsor Sofina Foods while the team searched for a new title sponsor.

When Latifi joined the Williams senior team in 2020, the team was facing bankruptcy. The racing press reported that Latifi's signature brought Williams €30 million or $40 million in sponsorship money from his family's enterprises, including Sofina Foods (his father's company) and Lavazza (one of Sofina's business partners). Latifi also brought in sponsorship money from the Royal Bank of Canada. However, Latifi pushed back against the "pay driver" label, noting that while "the reality of motorsport is that it is an expensive sport", his F2 performances had more than met the FIA Super License benchmarks to compete in Formula One.

After Latifi signed with Williams, the COVID-19 pandemic further exacerbated the team's financial issues. The team parted ways with title sponsor ROKiT, claiming that the latter had failed to timely pay its sponsorship dues. Michael Latifi provided further support to the team by working with HSBC to refinance Williams' debts, which provided the team with an immediate £28m cash injection.

==== 2020 ====
Williams promoted Latifi to the senior team for 2020, replacing Robert Kubica and partnering former Formula 2 competitor George Russell. Due to a Canadian dispute with the FIA, he spent the year racing under an American license, but F1 officially treated him as a Canadian.

Latifi endured a rocky rookie season. His problems were compounded by the woeful Williams car, which failed to score a single point all year. He made his race debut at the Austrian Grand Prix (that year's Australian Grand Prix having been cancelled). Despite a crash in the final practice session, which contributed to a last-placed qualifying, he finished in 11th, taking advantage of nine retirements. Overall, he struggled in qualifying and was knocked out in the first qualifying session in all but one race that year (the Hungarian Grand Prix), where he challenged for points but suffered a puncture and spun on lap 43. After a 15th-place finish at Silverstone, he commented that he made his "first legit overtake in Formula 1" when he passed Kimi Räikkönen.

Despite Williams' point-less season, Latifi came close to scoring points on several occasions. At the Italian Grand Prix, Latifi recovered from last to 11th, after a well-timed pit stop immediately before a safety car and red flag vaulted him into ninth place at the re-start. Although he later fell back to 12th, he overtook Räikkönen to finish 11th and beat his teammate Russell. He picked up his first F1 retirement at the Tuscan Grand Prix, following a multi-car accident at a restart. He finished 11th once again at the Emilia Romagna Grand Prix, aided by a late safety car. Latifi received an opportunity to compete with a new teammate when Russell was temporarily promoted to Mercedes for the Sakhir Grand Prix, and duly outqualified substitute Jack Aitken; however, he was forced to retire in 13th place due to an oil leak. Latifi ended his debut season 21st in the Drivers' Championship, the lowest of all full-time drivers. Russell beat him 15-0 in qualifying, although Latifi beat him on track in two races and finished another race where Russell took himself out with a driver error.

==== 2021 ====
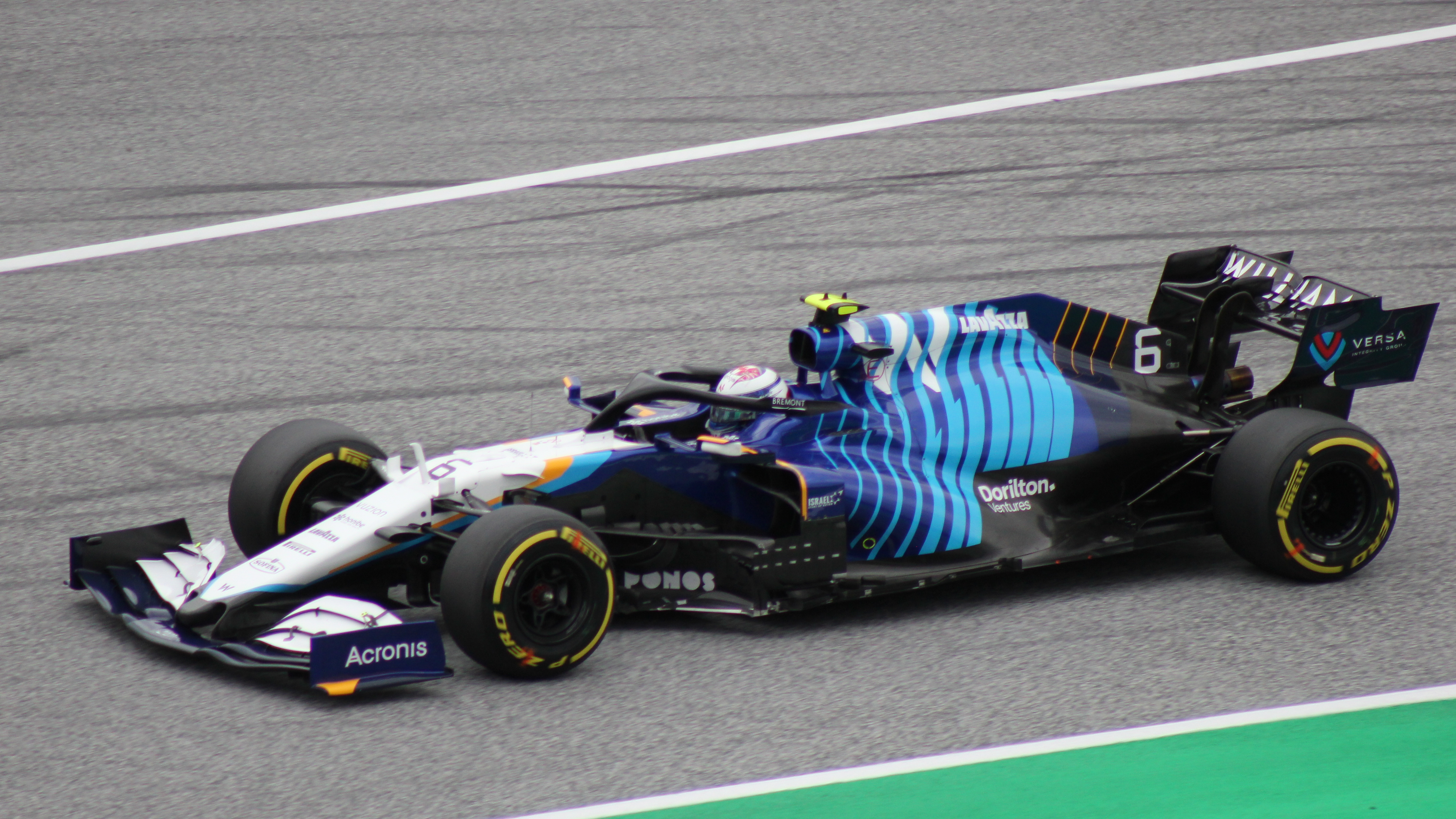
Latifi at the 2021 Austrian Grand Prix

Williams retained Latifi and Russell for the 2021 season. At round two, the Emilia Romagna Grand Prix, Latifi advanced to Q2 and achieved his career-best qualifying position with 14th place; however, he retired after colliding with Nikita Mazepin, who was in his blind spot. At the Spanish Grand Prix, Latifi finished 16th after nearly crashing on the final lap. For his first-ever Monaco Grand Prix, Latifi sported a one-off helmet to celebrate Williams' 750th race. He finished the race in 15th place without water, having failed to connect his drinks tube before the race.

Williams steadily improved during the season. Latifi narrowly missed out on Q2 for three races in a row, qualifying 16th at the Azerbaijan Grand Prix, French Grand Prix, and Styrian Grand Prix. In France, he was just two thousandths of a second away from Q2. He scored his first F1 points at the Hungarian Grand Prix, where he put on a career-best performance. He qualified in 18th, but received a golden opportunity when Valtteri Bottas set off a chain reaction of crashes at Turn 1. He carefully avoided the carnage, allowing him to enter Turn 2 in sixth position. At the restart, most drivers pitted for slicks, and Latifi overtook another two drivers due to good execution from Williams' pit crew. He rose to third after a Mercedes strategy miscue forced Lewis Hamilton to pit. He hung on to third place for 18 laps and eventually finished eighth, just ahead of Russell. He was subsequently promoted to seventh after Sebastian Vettel's disqualification. It was Williams' first double-points finish since the 2018 Italian Grand Prix, and Latifi's seventh-place finish was the team's best single finish since the 2017 Brazilian Grand Prix. Latifi said that he was "super happy" with the result.

Latifi continued to benefit from Williams' improved form, primarily in qualifying. A 12th-place qualifying finish, two penalties, and a Sergio Pérez crash allowed him to start the rain-affected Belgian Grand Prix in ninth place. Since the race took place in a downpour and was run entirely under safety car conditions, Latifi scored points for the second consecutive race. He made Q2 again at the following race, the Dutch Grand Prix, but a shunt during his flying lap doomed him to a pit lane start so that Williams could fix his car. At the Italian Grand Prix, Latifi finished 14th in the sprint race and nearly scored points for a third time before losing tenth place to Esteban Ocon at the safety car restart. He also qualified 14th at the Russian Grand Prix, but retired after colliding with the wall. Williams' form dropped off in the final third of the season, but Latifi outqualified Russell for the first time with a 16th-place grid placement at the São Paulo Grand Prix. He also finished 12th in a crash-filled Saudi Arabian Grand Prix, and outqualified Russell for a second time at the season-ending Abu Dhabi Grand Prix.

Latifi played an unexpectedly significant role in the Abu Dhabi GP, which had one of the most controversial and consequential endings to a race in Formula One history. Entering the race, Lewis Hamilton and Max Verstappen were tied for the championship lead. Hamilton led most of the race, but Latifi crashed on lap 53 of 58 while battling Mick Schumacher, triggering a safety car. Unwilling to end the race under safety car conditions, race director Michael Masi controversially ordered the five lapped drivers between Hamilton and Verstappen to unlap themselves, allowing Verstappen to close the gap to Hamilton and race for one final lap. Aided by brand-new tyres, Verstappen overtook Hamilton to win his first career World Drivers' Championship. Following the race, Latifi apologized for the crash but nonetheless received threats and hate messages from fans on social media. Following the race, he explained on his website that while most of the messages he had received had been supportive, he had received "shocking" online abuse, including death threats. He added that online accounts had also harassed his family and that "it's right to call out this kind of behavior". Hamilton and other Mercedes employees sent him private messages of support after the incident, while Red Bull team principal Christian Horner thanked and jokingly promised him a "lifetime's supply of Red Bull" after assisting Verstappen to his title triumph.

Latifi finished in 17th place in the Drivers' Championship with seven points, nine points behind Russell.

==== 2022 ====
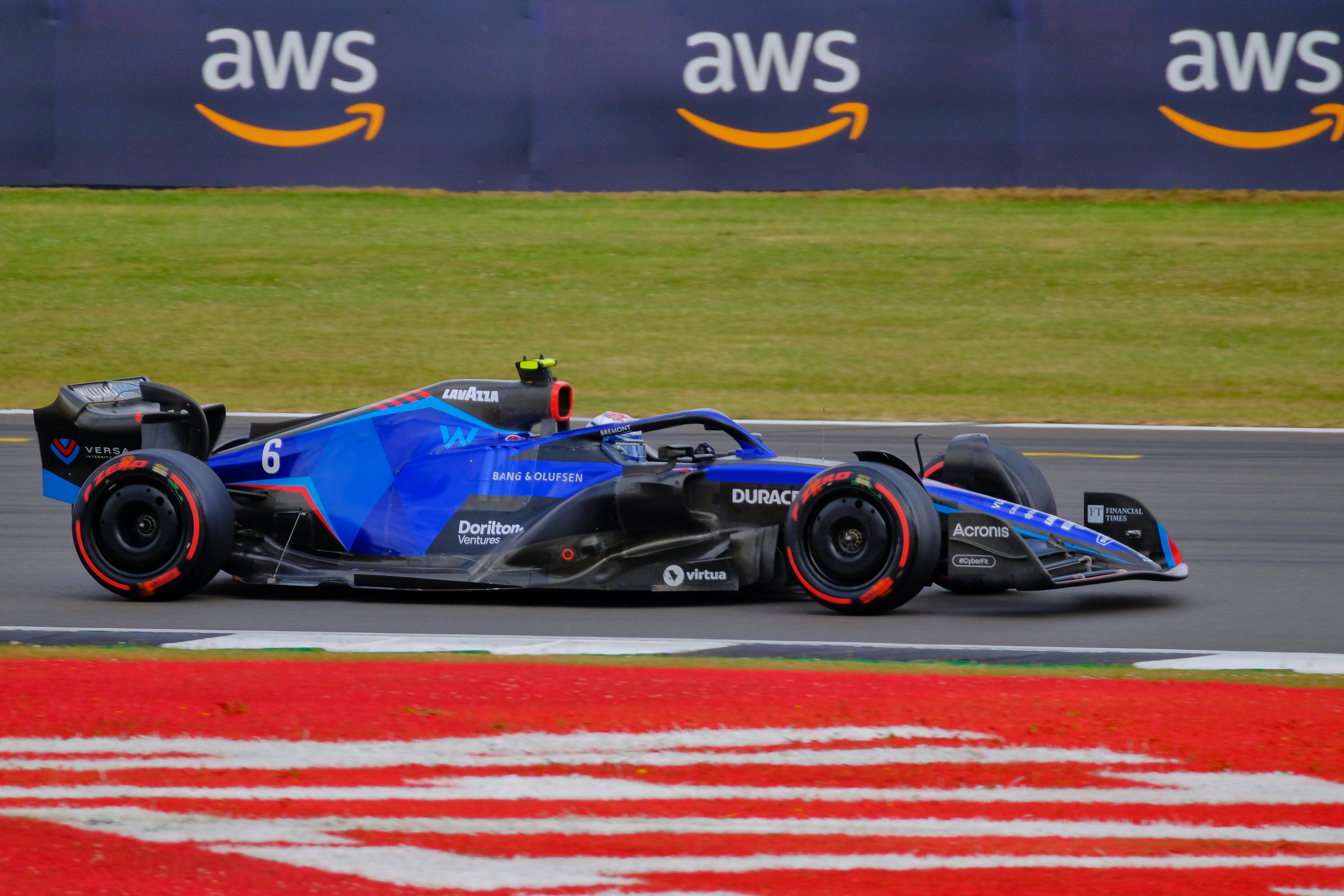
Latifi at the 2022 British Grand Prix

Latifi stayed with Williams for the 2022 season and was paired with his former DAMS teammate Alex Albon following Russell's promotion to Mercedes. Formula One debuted new regulations for the 2022 season, and Latifi admitted that he was having difficulty adjusting to the new ground effect cars. In addition, Williams team principal Jost Capito believed that the online abuse Latifi endured after the prior year's Abu Dhabi Grand Prix affected his performances during the season, and offered the team's "full support" to Latifi to rebuild his confidence.

In the first race of the year, the Bahrain Grand Prix, Latifi qualified last and finished the race in 16th. A week later at Jeddah, he crashed on his own during both qualifying and the race. He did not finish higher than 16th until round 5, the Miami Grand Prix (14th), and did not beat Albon in a race until round 6, the Spanish Grand Prix. He also crashed on the formation lap of the rain-affected Monaco Grand Prix. He started the race and finished in 15th, but Carlos Sainz accused Latifi of costing him the victory by holding him up under blue flags. The racing press circulated rumours that Latifi would be replaced mid-season by 2021 F2 champion Oscar Piastri following the Canadian Grand Prix, but Capito rejected that rumor, and Latifi finished out the season with Williams.

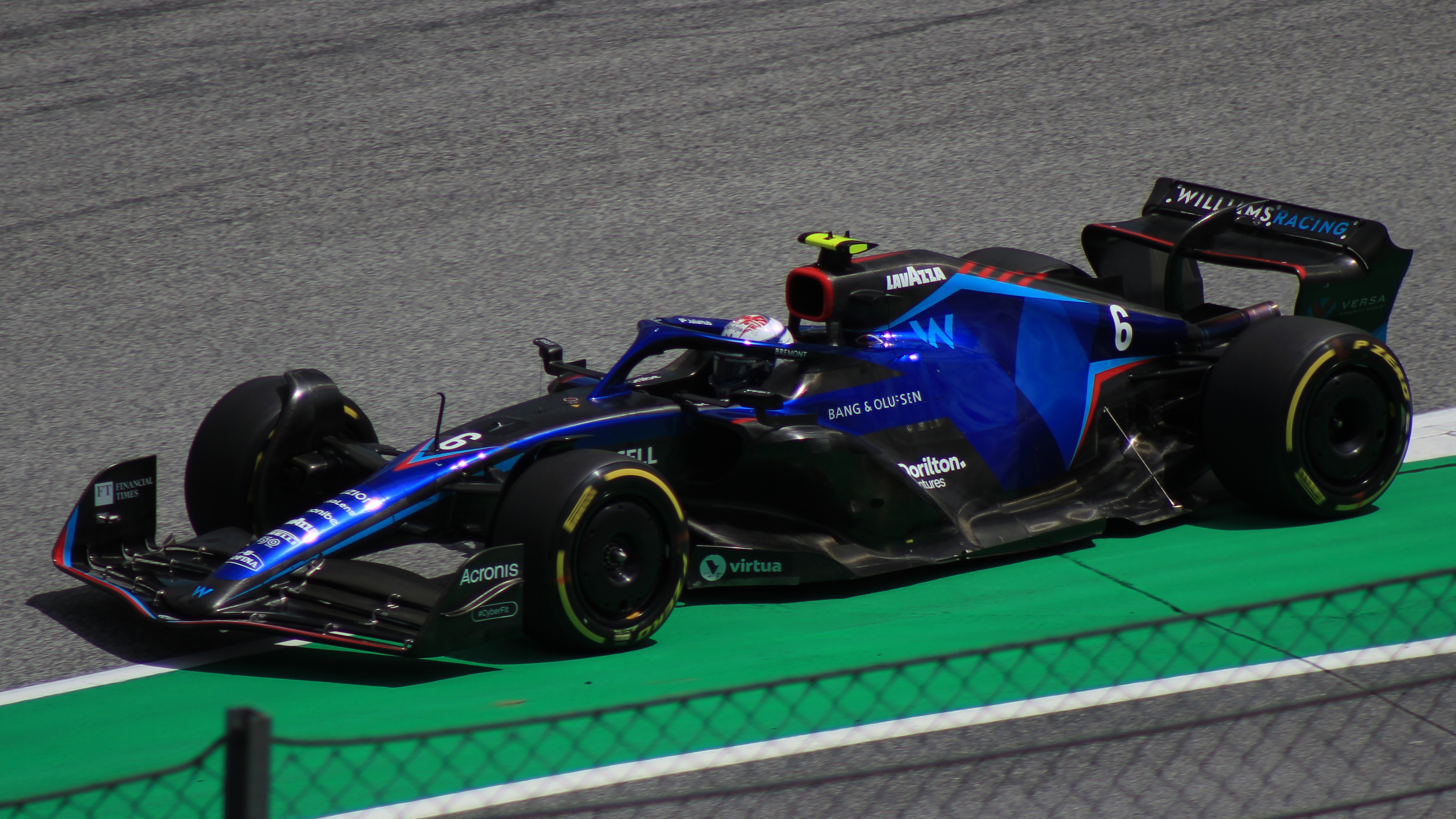
Latifi at the 2022 Austrian Grand Prix; he would fail to finish the race.

The British Grand Prix was a bright spot for Latifi, who made Q3 for the first time and qualified tenth. He improved to eighth at the start, but finished 12th after suffering floor damage. However, the on-track incidents continued to pile up. At the French Grand Prix, Latifi retired after colliding with Kevin Magnussen on lap 38; neither driver accepted sole responsibility for the incident. At the Belgian Grand Prix, Latifi spun, knocking Valtteri Bottas out of the race. At the Italian Grand Prix, Latifi's old F2 rival Nyck de Vries filled in for Albon, who withdrew due to appendicitis. De Vries outqualified Latifi and finished ninth compared to Latifi's 15th, which Autosport characterised as "the final nail in the coffin" for Latifi's tenure at Williams. Latifi went on to receive a five-place grid penalty after crashing Zhou Guanyu out of the Singapore Grand Prix.

Despite the grid penalty, the Japanese Grand Prix provided one last hurrah for Latifi, who qualified last but scored his first points of the season with a ninth-place finish after fortituously gambling by pitting for intermediate tyres at the end of a safety car restart. In his final race with Williams, the Abu Dhabi Grand Prix, Latifi's race was compromised when Mick Schumacher sent him into the barriers. He got back on track and nearly finished the race, but retired with an electrical issue and was classified as the 19th-place finisher.

Latifi finished 20th in the Drivers' Championship with two points. Although the Williams car took a step back in 2022, and Latifi finished only two points behind teammate Albon, his qualifying deficit to Albon was significantly worse than his deficit to Russell the year prior. Williams replaced him with academy driver Logan Sargeant for 2023. Latifi admitted that "it's a results-based industry [and] obviously the performance hasn't been there this year for many different reasons. ... I have accepted it and just have to move on". He wrote that "many young people around the world would love to be able" to race in Formula One and that he was "very grateful" for the experience. After enrolling in graduate school, he said that he did not expect to race in F1 again, but was willing to consider other categories of motorsport down the road.

== Karting record ==
=== Karting career summary ===
Season	Series	Team	Position
2009	Toronto Racing Association of Karters — Rotax Junior		11th
2009	Canadian National Karting Championships — Rotax Junior		11th
2010	South Garda Winter Cup — KF2		NC
2010	Canadian National Karting Championships — Rotax Junior		2nd
2010	Toronto Racing Association of Karters — Rotax Junior		4th
2010	Rotax Max Challenge Grand Finals — Junior		13th
2011	Florida Winter Tour — Rotax DD2		8th
2011	Canadian National Karting Championships — Rotax DD2		23rd
2011	Rotax Euro Challenge — DD2		28th
2011	Rotax Max Challenge Grand Finals — DD2		7th
2012	Florida Winter Tour — Open Shifter		4th
2012	Florida Winter Tour — Rotax DD2		1st
2012	Coupe de Quebec — Rotax DD2		5th
2012	Canadian National Karting Championships — Rotax DD2		DNF
2012	Rotax Max Challenge Grand Finals — DD2	SRA Karting International	13th

== Racing record ==
=== Racing career summary ===
Season	Series	Team	Races	Wins	Poles	F/Laps	Podiums	Points	Position
2012	Italian Formula 3 Championship	BVM	6	0	0	0	0	117	7th
2012	Italian Formula 3 Championship	JD Motorsport	18	1	0	0	4	117	7th
2012	Continental Tire Sports Car Challenge	Rehagen Racing	1	0	0	0	0	2	84th
2013	FIA Formula 3 European Championship	Carlin	30	0	0	0	0	45	15th
2013	British Formula 3 Championship	Carlin	11	0	2	1	1	97	5th
2013	Masters of Formula 3	Carlin	1	0	0	0	0	N/A	7th
2013	Toyota Racing Series	Giles Motorsport	15	0	0	0	0	503	9th
2014	FIA Formula 3 European Championship	Prema Powerteam	30	0	0	0	1	128	10th
2014	Florida Winter Series	Ferrari Driver Academy	12	4	0	2	7	N/A	N/A
2014	Porsche Carrera Cup GB	Redline Racing	2	0	0	0	0	14	23rd
2014	Formula Renault 3.5 Series	Tech 1 Racing	6	0	0	0	1	20	20th
2014	GP2 Series	Hilmer Motorsport	2	0	0	0	0	0	32nd
2014	Macau Grand Prix	Prema Powerteam	1	0	0	0	0	N/A	5th
2015	Formula Renault 3.5 Series	Arden Motorsport	17	0	0	1	0	55	11th
2015	Porsche Carrera Cup GB	Samsung SUHD TV Racing	8	0	0	0	1	72	11th
2015	Pro Mazda Winterfest	M1 Racing	4	0	0	0	2	60	12th
2015	GP2 Series	MP Motorsport	8	0	0	0	0	0	27th
2016	GP2 Series	DAMS	22	0	0	0	1	23	16th
2016	Formula One	Renault Sport F1 Team	Test driver						
2017	FIA Formula 2 Championship	DAMS	21	1	0	2	9	178	5th
2017	Formula One	Renault Sport F1 Team	Test driver						
2018	FIA Formula 2 Championship	DAMS	24	1	0	3	3	91	9th
2018	Formula One	Sahara Force India F1 Team	Test/Reserve driver						
2018	Formula One	Racing Point Force India F1 Team	Test/Reserve driver						
2019	FIA Formula 2 Championship	DAMS	22	4	0	3	8	214	**2nd**
2019	Formula One	ROKiT Williams Racing	Test/Reserve driver						
2020	Formula One	Williams Racing	17	0	0	0	0	0	21st
2021	Formula One	Williams Racing	22	0	0	0	0	7	17th
2022	Formula One	Williams Racing	22	0	0	0	0	2	20th

=== Complete Italian Formula Three Championship results ===
(key) (Races in bold indicate pole position) (Races in italics indicate fastest lap)

Year	Team	Chassis	Engine	1	2	3	4	5	6	7	8	9	10	11	12	13	14	15	16	17	18	19	20	21	22	23	24	Pos	Points	Ref
2012	BVM	Dallara F308	FPT	VRT; 1; 9	VRT; 2; 10	VRT; 3 Ret	HUN; 1; 7	HUN; 2; 9	HUN; 3; 4																			7th	117	
2012	JD Motorsport	Mygale M10	FPT							MUG; 1; 8	MUG; 2; 12	MUG; 3 Ret	MIS; 1; 10	MIS; 2; 8	MIS; 3; 5	RBR; 1; 7	RBR; 2; 7	RBR; 3; 7	IMO; 1; 4	IMO; 2; 6	IMO; 3; 2	VLL; 1; 6	VLL; 2 Ret	VLL; 3; 1	MNZ; 1; 8	MNZ; 2; 3	MNZ; 3; 2	7th	117	

=== Complete Toyota Racing Series results ===
(key) (Races in bold indicate pole position) (Races in italics indicate fastest lap)

Year	Team	1	2	3	4	5	6	7	8	9	10	11	12	13	14	15	DC	Points
2013	Giles Motorsport	TER; 1; 7	TER; 2; 10	TER; 3; 10	TIM; 1; 9	TIM; 2; 8	TIM; 3; 6	TAU; 1; 13	TAU; 2; 16	TAU; 3; 7	HMP; 1; 11	HMP; 2; 8	HMP; 3; 7	MAN; 1; 11	MAN; 2; 17	MAN; 3; 12	9th	503

=== Complete FIA Formula 3 European Championship results ===
(key) (Races in bold indicate pole position) (Races in italics indicate fastest lap)

Year	Entrant	Engine	1	2	3	4	5	6	7	8	9	10	11	12	13	14	15	16	17	18	19	20	21	22	23	24	25	26	27	28	29	30	31	32	33	DC	Points
2013	Carlin	Volkswagen	MNZ; 1; 15	MNZ; 2; 16	MNZ; 3 Ret	SIL; 1; 5	SIL; 2 Ret	SIL; 3; 10	HOC; 1; 23	HOC; 2; 22	HOC; 3; 15	BRH; 1 Ret	BRH; 2; 27	BRH; 3; 7	RBR; 1; 5	RBR; 2 Ret	RBR; 3; 7	NOR; 1 Ret	NOR; 2; 19	NOR; 3 Ret	NÜR; 1; 19	NÜR; 2; 17	NÜR; 3; 21	ZAN; 1; 8	ZAN; 2; 11	ZAN; 3 Ret	VAL; 1; 17	VAL; 2; 11	VAL; 3 Ret	HOC; 1; 12	HOC; 2; 13	HOC; 3 Ret				15th	45
2014	Prema Powerteam	Mercedes	SIL; 1; 6	SIL; 2; 2	SIL; 3; 4	HOC; 1 Ret	HOC; 2; 6	HOC; 3 Ret	PAU; 1 Ret	PAU; 2; 17†	PAU; 3 Ret	HUN; 1; 22	HUN; 2; 9	HUN; 3; 10	SPA; 1; 13	SPA; 2; 7	SPA; 3; 5	NOR; 1; 4	NOR; 2; 8	NOR; 3 Ret	MSC; 1; 7	MSC; 2; 8	MSC; 3; 17†	RBR; 1 Ret	RBR; 2; 8	RBR; 3; 4	NÜR; 1; 13	NÜR; 2; 10	NÜR; 3 Ret	IMO; 1 Ret	IMO; 2; 6	IMO; 3; 4	HOC; 1 DNP	HOC; 2 DNP	HOC; 3 DNP	10th	128

^{†} Driver did not finish the race, but was classified as he completed over 90% of the race distance.

=== Complete Macau Grand Prix results ===
Year	Team	Car	Qualifying	Quali Race	Main race
2014	(Hong Kong) Theodore Racing by Prema	Dallara F312	9th	7th	5th

=== Complete Formula Renault 3.5 Series results ===
(key) (Races in bold indicate pole position) (Races in italics indicate fastest lap)

Year	Team	1	2	3	4	5	6	7	8	9	10	11	12	13	14	15	16	17	Pos	Points
2014	Tech 1 Racing	MNZ; 1	MNZ; 2	ALC; 1	ALC; 2	MON; 1	SPA; 1	SPA; 2	MSC; 1	MSC; 2	NÜR; 1	NÜR; 2	HUN; 1 Ret	HUN; 2; 18	LEC; 1; 16	LEC; 2; 9	JER; 1; 16	JER; 2; 2	20th	20
2015	Arden Motorsport	ALC; 1; 8	ALC; 2; 14	MON; 1 Ret	SPA; 1; 4	SPA; 2; 13	HUN; 1 Ret	HUN; 2; 17	RBR; 1; 4	RBR; 2 Ret	SIL; 1; 8	SIL; 2; 5	NÜR; 1 Ret	NÜR; 2 Ret	BUG; 1 Ret	BUG; 2; 7	JER; 1; 7	JER; 2; 10	11th	55

=== Complete GP2 Series/FIA Formula 2 Championship results ===
(key) (Races in bold indicate pole position) (Races in italics indicate fastest lap)

Year	Entrant	1	2	3	4	5	6	7	8	9	10	11	12	13	14	15	16	17	18	19	20	21	22	23	24	Pos	Points
2014	Hilmer Motorsport	BHR; FEA	BHR; SPR	CAT; FEA	CAT; SPR	MON; FEA	MON; SPR	RBR; FEA	RBR; SPR	SIL; FEA	SIL; SPR	HOC; FEA	HOC; SPR	HUN; FEA	HUN; SPR	SPA; FEA	SPA; SPR	MNZ; FEA	MNZ; SPR	SOC; FEA	SOC; SPR	YMC; FEA; 22	YMC; SPR; 17			32nd	0
2015	MP Motorsport	BHR; FEA	BHR; SPR	CAT; FEA	CAT; SPR	MON; FEA	MON; SPR	RBR; FEA	RBR; SPR	SIL; FEA	SIL; SPR	HUN; FEA; 15	HUN; SPR; 14	SPA; FEA	SPA; SPR	MNZ; FEA	MNZ; SPR	SOC; FEA; 18	SOC; SPR; 14	BHR; FEA; 15	BHR; SPR; 11	YMC; FEA; Ret	YMC; SPR; C			27th	0
2016	DAMS	CAT; FEA; 2	CAT; SPR; 7	MON; FEA; Ret	MON; SPR; Ret	BAK; FEA; Ret	BAK; SPR; 13	RBR; FEA; 10	RBR; SPR; Ret	SIL; FEA; 11	SIL; SPR; 10	HUN; FEA; 16	HUN; SPR; 12	HOC; FEA; 14	HOC; SPR; 17	SPA; FEA; 13	SPA; SPR; 9	MNZ; FEA; 16	MNZ; SPR; 15	SEP; FEA; 14	SEP; SPR; 10	YMC; FEA; 9	YMC; SPR; 12			16th	23
2017	DAMS	BHR; FEA; 11	BHR; SPR; 4	CAT; FEA; 6	CAT; SPR; 3	MON; FEA; Ret	MON; SPR; 13	BAK; FEA; 3	BAK; SPR; 3	RBR; FEA; 2	RBR; SPR; 8	SIL; FEA; 8	SIL; SPR; 1	HUN; FEA; 2	HUN; SPR; 6	SPA; FEA; DNS	SPA; SPR; 9	MNZ; FEA; 3	MNZ; SPR; 16	JER; FEA; 4	JER; SPR; 2	YMC; FEA; 5	YMC; SPR; 3			5th	178
2018	DAMS	BHR; FEA; 11	BHR; SPR; 10	BAK; FEA; 5	BAK; SPR; 3	CAT; FEA; 14	CAT; SPR; 8	MON; FEA; 9	MON; SPR; 8	LEC; FEA; 7	LEC; SPR; 8	RBR; FEA; 11	RBR; SPR; 8	SIL; FEA; 17	SIL; SPR; 16	HUN; FEA; Ret	HUN; SPR; 16	SPA; FEA; 8	SPA; SPR; 1	MNZ; FEA; 5	MNZ; SPR; 4	SOC; FEA; 2	SOC; SPR; Ret	YMC; FEA; Ret	YMC; SPR; 15	9th	91
2019	DAMS	BHR; FEA; 1	BHR; SPR; 3	BAK; FEA; 4	BAK; SPR; 1	CAT; FEA; 1	CAT; SPR; 6	MON; FEA; 12	MON; SPR; 10	LEC; FEA; 5	LEC; SPR; 6	RBR; FEA; 9	RBR; SPR; 6	SIL; FEA; 2	SIL; SPR; 5	HUN; FEA; 1	HUN; SPR; 7	SPA; FEA; C	SPA; SPR; C	MNZ; FEA; 13	MNZ; SPR; 10	SOC; FEA; 2	SOC; SPR; 4	YMC; FEA; 7	YMC; SPR; 2	2nd	214

=== Complete Formula One results ===
(key) (Races in bold indicate pole position) (Races in italics indicate fastest lap)

Year	Entrant	Chassis	Engine	1	2	3	4	5	6	7	8	9	10	11	12	13	14	15	16	17	18	19	20	21	22	WDC	Points
2018	Sahara Force India F1 Team	Force India VJM11	Mercedes F1 M09 EQ Power+ 1.6 V6 t	AUS	BHR	CHN	AZE	ESP	MON	CAN; TD	FRA	AUT	GBR	GER; TD	HUN											–	–
2018	Racing Point Force India F1 Team	Force India VJM11	Mercedes F1 M09 EQ Power+ 1.6 V6 t													BEL	ITA	SIN	RUS; TD	JPN	USA; TD**	MEX; TD	BRA; TD	ABU		–	–
2019	ROKiT Williams Racing	Williams FW42	Mercedes F1 M10 EQ Power+ 1.6 V6 t	AUS	BHR	CHN	AZE	ESP	MON	CAN; TD	FRA; TD	AUT	GBR	GER	HUN	BEL; TD	ITA	SIN	RUS	JPN	MEX; TD	USA; TD	BRA; TD	ABU		–	–
2020	Williams Racing	Williams FW43	Mercedes F1 M11 EQ Performance 1.6 V6 t	AUT; 11	STY; 17	HUN; 19	GBR; 15	70A; 19	ESP; 18	BEL; 16	ITA; 11	TUS; Ret	RUS; 16	EIF; 14	POR; 18	EMI; 11	TUR; Ret	BHR; 14	SKH; Ret	ABU; 17						21st	0
2021	Williams Racing	Williams FW43B	Mercedes F1 M12 E Performance 1.6 V6 t	BHR; 18†	EMI; Ret	POR; 18	ESP; 16	MON; 15	AZE; 16	FRA; 18	STY; 17	AUT; 16	GBR; 14	HUN; 7	BEL; 9‡	NED; 16	ITA; 11	RUS; 19†	TUR; 17	USA; 15	MXC; 17	SAP; 16	QAT; Ret	SAU; 12	ABU; Ret	17th	7
2022	Williams Racing	Williams FW44	Mercedes F1 M13 E Performance V6 t	BHR; 16	SAU; Ret	AUS; 16	EMI; 16	MIA; 14	ESP; 16	MON; 15	AZE; 15	CAN; 16	GBR; 12	AUT; Ret	FRA; Ret	HUN; 18	BEL; 18	NED; 18	ITA; 15	SIN; Ret	JPN; 9	USA; 17	MXC; 18	SAP; 16	ABU; 19†	20th	2

  - Latifi was entered as third driver, but this was reversed ahead of the session.

^{†} Did not finish the Grand Prix but was classified, as he completed more than 90% of the race distance.
^{‡} Half points awarded as less than 75% of race distance was completed.

== See also ==
- Formula One drivers from Canada
