= 2022 Hungarian Grand Prix =

Thirteenth round of the 2022 F1 season

Race 13 of 22 in the 2022 Formula One World Championship
← Previous race	Next race →
- Layout of the Hungaroring

Race details
- Date: 31 July 2022
- Official name: Formula 1 Aramco Magyar Nagydíj 2022
- Location: Hungaroring; Mogyoród, Hungary
- Course: Permanent racing facility
- Course length: 4.381 km (2.722 miles)
- Distance: 70 laps, 306.630 km (190.531 miles)
- Weather: Overcast with drizzle throughout, light rain at the end
- Attendance: 290,000

Pole position
Driver	(United Kingdom) George Russell	Mercedes
- Time: 1:17.377

Fastest lap
Driver	(United Kingdom) Lewis Hamilton	Mercedes
- Time: 1:21.386 on lap 57

Podium
First	(Netherlands) Max Verstappen	Red Bull Racing-RBPT
Second	(United Kingdom) Lewis Hamilton	Mercedes
Third	(United Kingdom) George Russell	Mercedes

The 2022 Hungarian Grand Prix (officially known as the Formula 1 Aramco Magyar Nagydíj 2022) was a Formula One motor race held on 31 July 2022 at the Hungaroring in Mogyoród, Hungary over a distance of 70 laps. The race was the thirty-seventh Hungarian Grand Prix to be held as part of the Formula One World Championship.

The race was won by Max Verstappen from the 10th position on the starting grid, while Mercedes drivers Lewis Hamilton and George Russell finished second and third respectively, with Russell having started from pole position. Ferrari drivers Carlos Sainz Jr. and Charles Leclerc both started strongly but could not hold up until the end of the race, finishing fourth and sixth respectively. Championship leader Verstappen extended his lead over Leclerc to 80 points.

== Background ==
The event was held across the weekend of the 29–31 July. It was the thirteenth round of the 2022 Formula One World Championship.

=== Championship standings before the race ===
Max Verstappen led the Drivers' Championship by 63 points from Charles Leclerc, with Sergio Pérez third, a further 7 points behind. Red Bull Racing led the Constructors' Championship, leading Ferrari by 82 points and Mercedes by 126 points.

=== Entrants ===
The drivers and teams were the same as the season entry list with no additional stand-in drivers for the race. Robert Kubica drove for Alfa Romeo in place of Valtteri Bottas during the first practice session.

=== Tyre choices ===
Tyre supplier Pirelli brought the C2, C3, and C4 tyre compounds (designated hard, medium, and soft, respectively) for teams to use at the event.

== Practice ==
The first practice session took place at 14:00 local time (UTC+02:00) on 29 July 2022. Carlos Sainz Jr. was quickest, with Max Verstappen and Charles Leclerc in second and third respectively. The second practice session took part on the same day at 17:00 local time. Leclerc was quickest, with Lando Norris and Sainz in second and third respectively. The third practice session started at 13:00 on 30 July 2022. Sebastian Vettel crashed out at turn 10, causing a red flag. Once the session restarted, Nicholas Latifi went fastest, with Leclerc and Alexander Albon in second and third respectively.

== Qualifying ==
Qualifying took place at 16:00 local time (UTC+02:00) on 30 July 2022, and lasted for one hour. The qualifying session was held in dry but overcast conditions throughout.

The first part of qualifying (Q1) saw the bottom five drivers eliminated from the rest of the session. Nicholas Latifi was knocked out in Q1 and qualified 20th and last having made a mistake at the final corner on his final attempt in Q1. Yuki Tsunoda, Alexander Albon, Sebastian Vettel, Pierre Gasly and Latifi were eliminated.

The second part of qualifying (Q2) saw the bottom five drivers eliminated from the rest of the session. Sergio Pérez had a lap time, that was initially deleted for a track limits infringement, before being reinstated after further inspection, with the FIA deeming that he did not violate track limits. Pérez, Zhou Guanyu, Magnussen, Lance Stroll and Mick Schumacher were eliminated. Pérez blamed Magnussen for blocking his final attempt, arguing that he would have progressed had Magnussen not blocked him.

The third part of qualifying (Q3) was a ten-car shoot-out for pole position. After everyone's initial runs, Carlos Sainz Jr. was on provisional pole, with George Russell and Charles Leclerc in second and third. Championship leader, Max Verstappen, locked up on his lap, so he only managed to be seventh. All cars then attempted another, final, lap to challenge for pole position, although Verstappen had power unit problems, which meant he was unable to set a representative lap; he qualified tenth. Russell, competing for Mercedes, took his maiden pole position of his Formula One career, he had previously twice qualified second. His pole was also the first pole for Mercedes in 2022. Ferrari drivers Sainz and Leclerc were second and third respectively, with Lando Norris in fourth and Esteban Ocon in fifth. Russell's teammate, Lewis Hamilton, had a DRS issue, coting his time and resulting in him qualifying seventh, eight-tenths from pole.

=== Post qualifying ===
Following the session Verstappen, Pérez and Gasly were critical of the stewards' handling of track limit violations. Williams were fined €1,000 after they were found to have used a set of soft tyres in Q1 on the car of Albon which the team had already electronically returned—which is illegal under the sporting regulations. The stewards chose not to impose a sporting penalty after accepting that no unfair sporting advantage had been gained by using these tyres and that the rule breach was purely an administrative error.

=== Qualifying classification ===
Pos.	No.	Driver	Constructor	Qualifying times			Final grid
Pos.	No.	Driver	Constructor	Q1	Q2	Q3	Final grid
1	63	(United Kingdom) George Russell	Mercedes	1:18.407	1:18.154	1:17.377	1
2	55	(Spain) Carlos Sainz Jr.	Ferrari	1:18.434	1:17.946	1:17.421	2
3	16	(Monaco) Charles Leclerc	Ferrari	1:18.806	1:17.768	1:17.567	3
4	4	(United Kingdom) Lando Norris	McLaren-Mercedes	1:18.653	1:18.121	1:17.769	4
5	31	(France) Esteban Ocon	Alpine-Renault	1:18.866	1:18.216	1:18.018	5
6	14	(Spain) Fernando Alonso	Alpine-Renault	1:18.716	1:17.904	1:18.078	6
7	44	(United Kingdom) Lewis Hamilton	Mercedes	1:18.374	1:18.035	1:18.142	7
8	77	(Finland) Valtteri Bottas	Alfa Romeo-Ferrari	1:18.935	1:18.445	1:18.157	8
9	3	(Australia) Daniel Ricciardo	McLaren-Mercedes	1:18.775	1:18.198	1:18.379	9
10	1	(Netherlands) Max Verstappen	Red Bull Racing-RBPT	1:18.509	1:17.703	1:18.823	10
11	11	(Mexico) Sergio Pérez	Red Bull Racing-RBPT	1:19.118	1:18.516	N/A	11
12	24	(China) Zhou Guanyu	Alfa Romeo-Ferrari	1:18.973	1:18.573	N/A	12
13	20	(Denmark) Kevin Magnussen	Haas-Ferrari	1:18.993	1:18.825	N/A	13
14	18	(Canada) Lance Stroll	Aston Martin Aramco-Mercedes	1:19.205	1:19.137	N/A	14
15	47	(Germany) Mick Schumacher	Haas-Ferrari	1:19.164	1:19.202	N/A	15
16	22	(Japan) Yuki Tsunoda	AlphaTauri-RBPT	1:19.240	N/A	N/A	16
17	23	(Thailand) Alexander Albon	Williams-Mercedes	1:19.256	N/A	N/A	17
18	5	(Germany) Sebastian Vettel	Aston Martin Aramco-Mercedes	1:19.273	N/A	N/A	18
19	10	(France) Pierre Gasly	AlphaTauri-RBPT	1:19.527	N/A	N/A	PL^{a}
20	6	(Canada) Nicholas Latifi	Williams-Mercedes	1:19.570	N/A	N/A	19
107% time: 1:23.860

- ^a – Pierre Gasly qualified 19th, but he was required to start the race from the back of the grid for exceeding his quota of power unit elements. The new power unit elements were changed while the car was under parc fermé without the permission of the technical delegate. He was then required to start the race from the pit lane.

== Race ==
The race started at 15:00 local time (UTC+02:00) on 31 July 2022, and lasted for 70 laps. George Russell kept first place into turn one, from Carlos Sainz Jr. and Charles Leclerc. Further back, Esteban Ocon defended from his Alpine teammate, Fernando Alonso, who later complained about Ocon's defence on the team radio. Contact between Lance Stroll and Alexander Albon meant the latter had to pit to replace a damaged front wing. Kevin Magnussen was forced to pit after he was shown the black and orange flag, due to damage to the right side of his front wing. The virtual safety car (VSC) was called out to pick up debris caused by the collisions. Once the VSC ended, Russell immediately pulled a 2.5 second gap to Sainz. With the help of DRS, Max Verstappen made his way through the grid, overtaking his teammate, both Alpine cars and Lando Norris, before pitting and undercutting Lewis Hamilton. Russell and Sainz both had slow pit stops, which allowed Leclerc to overcut Sainz and close up to Russell, later overtaking him into turn one. Verstappen then closed the gap to Russell and Sainz, as Leclerc extended his lead at the front.

Verstappen pitted again, with Russell and Leclerc making reactionary pitstops. Verstappen undercut Russell, while Leclerc pit onto the slower hard tyres. Verstappen overtook Leclerc into turn one and proceeded to give the lead back after spinning at turn 13 on lap 41. He re-overtook Leclerc. Sainz and Hamilton pitted onto the soft compound tyres, which elevated Verstappen into first. Russell overtook Leclerc, which prompted him to pit and change onto the soft tyres. Hamilton chased down Sainz and Russell, overtaking them both before the end of the race, promoting himself into second.

Yuki Tsunoda spun, causing a brief yellow flag. Stroll attempted to overtake Daniel Ricciardo, Ricciardo locked up and hit Stroll, causing the latter to spin. Neither driver received damage and both carried on whilst Ricciardo was given a five-second time penalty for causing the collision. Valtteri Bottas had a power unit issue on lap 66, leading to his retirement and the second VSC of the race. As the VSC ended, the rain replaced the light drizzle that had been present throughout the race and DRS was disabled on the last lap; all drivers managed to reach the finish without changing onto wet weather tyres.

Verstappen won the race, Hamilton (who set the fastest lap on lap 57) and Russell finishing second and third respectively, leading to Mercedes' second consecutive double podium. Sainz finished fourth. Sergio Pérez was fifth, and Leclerc sixth. Norris finished seventh, ahead of the Alpines of Alonso and Ocon who finished eighth and ninth respectively. Sebastian Vettel finished tenth and was the last of the points finishers.

=== Post race ===
Ferrari was criticised by media for their decision to place the hard tyres onto Leclerc's car, despite the obvious pace loss shown by the Alpine drivers earlier in the race. Former Formula One driver, Anthony Davidson, said that "improvement[s] need to be made" in reference to Ferrari's strategy, while Sky Sports pundit Ted Kravitz claimed the strategy was "baffling". Mattia Binotto defended his team, attributing the finishing position to the lack of pace rather than the tyres. Leclerc later admitted the strategy was a "disaster". Leclerc's teammate Carlos Sainz agreed with team principal's defence, noting that he himself was unable to finish on the podium despite using the strategy most pundits state should have been used for Leclerc. Reporter Alex Mitton called the Ferrari strategy team the "worst", while commentator Alex Brundle exclaimed the hard tyres made "no sense".

=== Race classification ===
Pos.	No.	Driver	Constructor	Laps	Time/Retired	Grid	Points
1	1	(Netherlands) Max Verstappen	Red Bull Racing-RBPT	70	1:39:35.912	10	25
2	44	(United Kingdom) Lewis Hamilton	Mercedes	70	+7.834	7	19^{a}
3	63	(United Kingdom) George Russell	Mercedes	70	+12.337	1	15
4	55	(Spain) Carlos Sainz Jr.	Ferrari	70	+14.579	2	12
5	11	(Mexico) Sergio Pérez	Red Bull Racing-RBPT	70	+15.688	11	10
6	16	(Monaco) Charles Leclerc	Ferrari	70	+16.047	3	8
7	4	(United Kingdom) Lando Norris	McLaren-Mercedes	70	+1:18.300	4	6
8	14	(Spain) Fernando Alonso	Alpine-Renault	69	+1 lap	6	4
9	31	(France) Esteban Ocon	Alpine-Renault	69	+1 lap	5	2
10	5	(Germany) Sebastian Vettel	Aston Martin Aramco-Mercedes	69	+1 lap	18	1
11	18	(Canada) Lance Stroll	Aston Martin Aramco-Mercedes	69	+1 lap	14	
12	10	(France) Pierre Gasly	AlphaTauri-RBPT	69	+1 lap	PL	
13	24	(China) Zhou Guanyu	Alfa Romeo-Ferrari	69	+1 lap	12	
14	47	(Germany) Mick Schumacher	Haas-Ferrari	69	+1 lap	15	
15	3	(Australia) Daniel Ricciardo	McLaren-Mercedes	69	+1 lap^{b}	9	
16	20	(Denmark) Kevin Magnussen	Haas-Ferrari	69	+1 lap	13	
17	23	(Thailand) Alexander Albon	Williams-Mercedes	69	+1 lap	17	
18	6	(Canada) Nicholas Latifi	Williams-Mercedes	69	+1 lap	19	
19	22	(Japan) Yuki Tsunoda	AlphaTauri-RBPT	68	+2 laps	16	
20^{c}	77	(Finland) Valtteri Bottas	Alfa Romeo-Ferrari	65	Fuel System	8	
Fastest lap: (United Kingdom) Lewis Hamilton (Mercedes) – 1:21.386 (lap 57)

Notes

- ^a – Includes one point for fastest lap.
- ^b – Daniel Ricciardo finished 13th, but he received a five-second time penalty for causing a collision with Lance Stroll.
- ^c – Valtteri Bottas was classified as he completed more than 90% of the race distance.

== Championship standings after the race ==
Drivers' Championship standings

	Pos.	Driver	Points
	1	(Netherlands) Max Verstappen	258
	2	(Monaco) Charles Leclerc	178
	3	(Mexico) Sergio Pérez	173
1	4	(United Kingdom) George Russell	158
1	5	(Spain) Carlos Sainz Jr.	156

Constructors' Championship standings

Pos.	Constructor	Points
1	(Austria) Red Bull Racing-RBPT	431
2	(Italy) Ferrari	334
3	(Germany) Mercedes	304
4	(France) Alpine-Renault	99
5	(United Kingdom) McLaren-Mercedes	95

- Note: Only the top five positions are included for both sets of standings.

== See also ==
- 2022 Budapest Formula 2 round
- 2022 Budapest Formula 3 round
- 2022 W Series Budapest round

Previous race: 2022 French Grand Prix	FIA Formula One World Championship; 2022 season	Next race: 2022 Belgian Grand Prix
Previous race: 2021 Hungarian Grand Prix	Hungarian Grand Prix	Next race: 2023 Hungarian Grand Prix
