= 2022 French Grand Prix =

Twelfth round of the 2022 F1 season

Race 12 of 22 in the 2022 Formula One World Championship
← Previous race	Next race →
- Layout of the Circuit Paul Ricard

Race details
- Date: 24 July 2022
- Official name: Formula 1 Lenovo Grand Prix de France 2022
- Location: Circuit Paul Ricard; Le Castellet, Provence-Alpes-Côte d'Azur, France
- Course: Permanent racing circuit
- Course length: 5.842 km (3.630 miles)
- Distance: 53 laps, 309.626 km (192.432 miles)
- Weather: Sunny
- Attendance: 200,000

Pole position
Driver	(Monaco) Charles Leclerc	Ferrari
- Time: 1:30.872

Fastest lap
Driver	(Spain) Carlos Sainz Jr.	Ferrari
- Time: 1:35.781 on lap 51

Podium
First	(Netherlands) Max Verstappen	Red Bull Racing-RBPT
Second	(United Kingdom) Lewis Hamilton	Mercedes
Third	(United Kingdom) George Russell	Mercedes

The 2022 French Grand Prix (officially known as the Formula 1 Lenovo Grand Prix de France 2022) was a Formula One motor race held on 24 July 2022 at the Circuit Paul Ricard in Le Castellet, France.

Going into the race with 2 consecutive wins for Ferrari and a solid qualifying performance that saw him in pole position, championship challenger Charles Leclerc and Ferrari were favoured for the win, which would have reduced their arrears to the championship leader and title holder Max Verstappen. However, Leclerc, who had been leading the race, spun out on lap 18, conceding the win to Verstappen. Mercedes drivers Lewis Hamilton and George Russell finished second and third, respectively, giving the team their first double podium of the season.

The race was arguably a turning point in the season, as Verstappen and Red Bull powered on to a streak of victories that saw them become Champions, while Ferrari never recovered from the points and pace deficit that arose over the remainder of the season, a fact highlighted by the Monegasque driver's scream of despair and frustration after crashing out. As of 2026, this was also the last French Grand Prix to be held, as the race was not contracted for the 2023 season and beyond.

== Background ==
The event was held across the weekend of the 22–24 July, during the 2022 European heat waves. It was the twelfth round of the 2022 Formula One World Championship.

=== Championship standings before the race ===
Max Verstappen led the Drivers' Championship by 38 points from Charles Leclerc, with Sergio Pérez third, a further 19 points behind. Red Bull Racing led the Constructors' Championship, leading Ferrari by 56 points and Mercedes by 122 points.

=== Entrants ===
The drivers and teams were the same as the season entry list with no additional stand-in drivers for the race. Nyck de Vries and Robert Kubica drove for Mercedes in place of Lewis Hamilton and for Alfa Romeo in place of Valtteri Bottas, respectively, during the first practice session.

The Grand Prix marked the 300th race entry and start for Lewis Hamilton.

=== Tyre choices ===
Tyre supplier Pirelli brought the C2, C3, and C4 tyre compounds (designated hard, medium, and soft, respectively) for teams to use at the event.

=== Track changes ===
The end of the pit lane speed limit zone was moved from where the last team garage to the actual pit exit for safety reason, with the change expected to add 3.5–4 seconds to the time cars lose in the pit lane. In addition, following concerns from the Grand Prix Drivers' Association over consistency of penalties being handed out in races, a handful of incidents were informally reviewed in the drivers briefing to see where drivers felt the penalty system had worked and where it had not worked well.

== Practice ==
The first two practice sessions took place on 22 July, while the third practice session was held on 23 July 2022.

== Qualifying ==
Qualifying was held on 23 July 2022.

=== Qualifying classification ===
Pos.	No.	Driver	Constructor	Qualifying times			Final grid
Pos.	No.	Driver	Constructor	Q1	Q2	Q3	Final grid
1	16	(Monaco) Charles Leclerc	Ferrari	1:31.727	1:31.216	1:30.872	1
2	1	(Netherlands) Max Verstappen	Red Bull Racing-RBPT	1:31.891	1:31.990	1:31.176	2
3	11	(Mexico) Sergio Pérez	Red Bull Racing-RBPT	1:32.354	1:32.120	1:31.335	3
4	44	(United Kingdom) Lewis Hamilton	Mercedes	1:33.041	1:32.274	1:31.765	4
5	4	(United Kingdom) Lando Norris	McLaren-Mercedes	1:32.672	1:32.777	1:32.032	5
6	63	(United Kingdom) George Russell	Mercedes	1:33.109	1:32.633	1:32.131	6
7	14	(Spain) Fernando Alonso	Alpine-Renault	1:32.819	1:32.631	1:32.552	7
8	22	(Japan) Yuki Tsunoda	AlphaTauri-RBPT	1:33.394	1:32.836	1:32.780	8
9	55	(Spain) Carlos Sainz Jr.	Ferrari	1:32.297	1:31.081	No time	19^{a}
10	20	(Denmark) Kevin Magnussen	Haas-Ferrari	1:32.756	1:32.649	No time	20^{a}
11	3	(Australia) Daniel Ricciardo	McLaren-Mercedes	1:33.404	1:32.922	N/A	9
12	31	(France) Esteban Ocon	Alpine-Renault	1:33.346	1:33.048	N/A	10
13	77	(Finland) Valtteri Bottas	Alfa Romeo-Ferrari	1:33.034	1:33.052	N/A	11
14	5	(Germany) Sebastian Vettel	Aston Martin Aramco-Mercedes	1:33.285	1:33.276	N/A	12
15	23	(Thailand) Alexander Albon	Williams-Mercedes	1:33.423	1:33.307	N/A	13
16	10	(France) Pierre Gasly	AlphaTauri-RBPT	1:33.439^{b}	N/A	N/A	14
17	18	(Canada) Lance Stroll	Aston Martin Aramco-Mercedes	1:33.439^{b}	N/A	N/A	15
18	24	(China) Zhou Guanyu	Alfa Romeo-Ferrari	1:33.674	N/A	N/A	16
19	47	(Germany) Mick Schumacher	Haas-Ferrari	1:33.701	N/A	N/A	17
20	6	(Canada) Nicholas Latifi	Williams-Mercedes	1:33.794	N/A	N/A	18
107% time: 1:38.148

Notes

- ^a – Carlos Sainz Jr. and Kevin Magnussen were required to start the race from the back of the grid for exceeding their quota of power unit elements.
- ^b – Pierre Gasly and Lance Stroll set the identical lap time in qualifying. Gasly was classified ahead of Stroll as he set the lap time earlier.

== Race ==
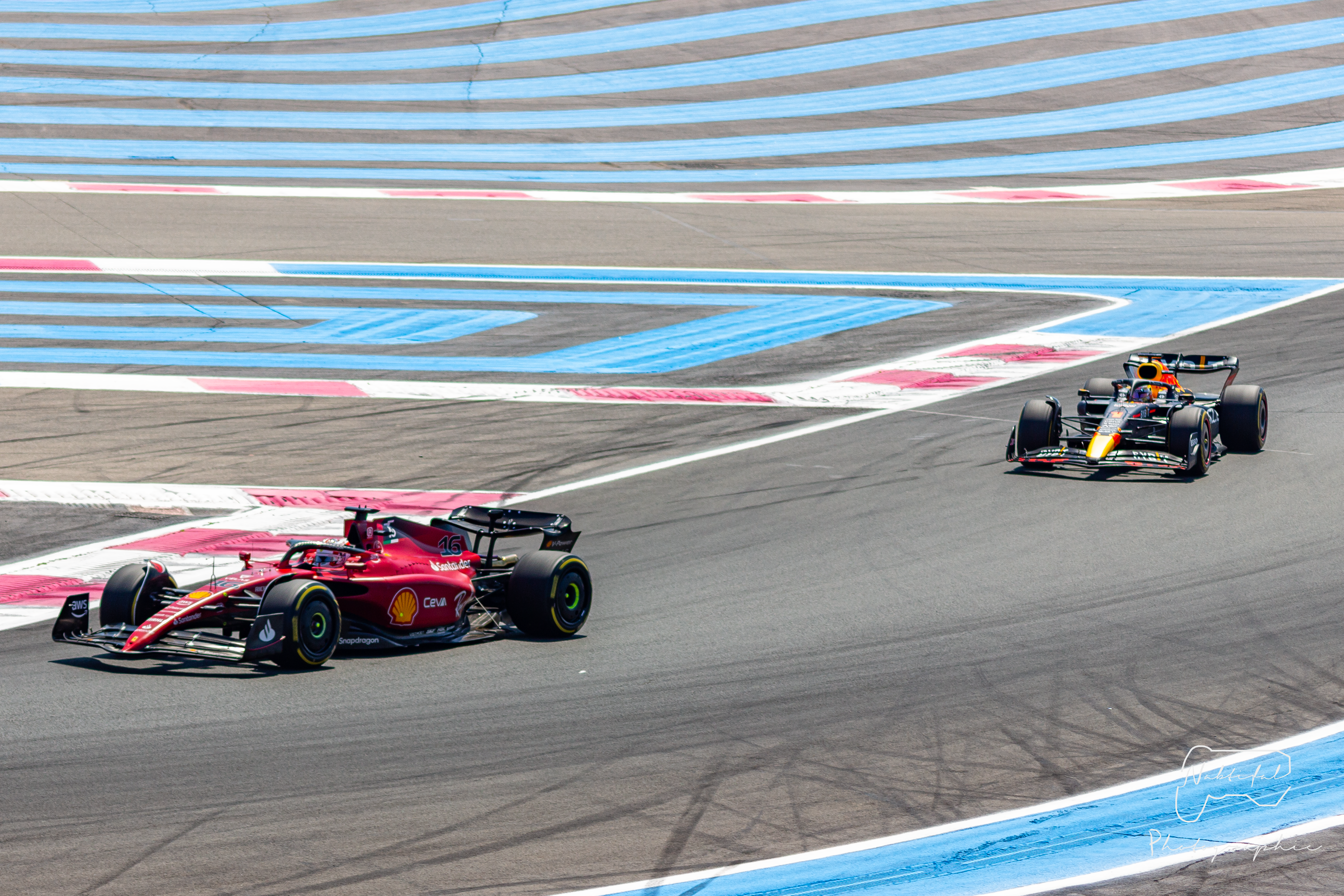
Charles Leclerc leading Max Verstappen before his crash on lap 18

Prior to the race, some teams worried that the high temperatures may overheat the power unit or tyres. The race started at 15:00 local time (CEST) on 24 July and was contested over 53 laps. Charles Leclerc maintained his first position into turn one, from Max Verstappen. Lewis Hamilton jumped Sergio Pérez and attempted to challenge Verstappen, but could not complete a move. Esteban Ocon and Yuki Tsunoda collided at turn eight. Both were able to carry on initially, though Tsunoda later retired due to damage received in the crash. Ocon was given a five-second time penalty by the FIA.

Verstappen pitted on lap 16 to undercut Leclerc, but on lap 18, Leclerc lost the rear end, due to driver error, spun and hit the tyre barrier. He could not reverse out and was forced to retire. The safety car was deployed, which allowed the majority of the field to pit. Carlos Sainz Jr. was released into the path of Alexander Albon and the FIA determined it was an unsafe release and subsequently awarded Sainz a five-second time penalty. As the race restarted, Verstappen kept first place, further back Zhou Guanyu and Mick Schumacher collided. Both were able to carry on, and Zhou was given a five-second time penalty by the FIA.

On lap 41, Sainz overtook Pérez. George Russell, who was behind Pérez, attempted an overtake in the braking zone of turn eight, where they made contact. Pérez was forced wide and kept the place from Russell. Sainz later pitted due to tyre concerns and was relegated to ninth (also serving his 5 second time penalty), fighting back up to fifth.

Kevin Magnussen and Nicholas Latifi collided, contributing to both of their retirements later in the race, while Zhou, who had a power unit issue, pulled over on lap 49, which brought out the virtual safety car (VSC). Once his car was recovered, the VSC ended and Russell immediately got past Pérez; Pérez said that he was slow at the restart, as he expected the race to resume earlier, and could not react in time to the delayed restart.

Verstappen won the race, with Hamilton in second and his Mercedes teammate, Russell, in third. Pérez finished fourth and Sainz was fifth. Fernando Alonso finished sixth, ahead of Lando Norris and Esteban Ocon, who finished seventh and eighth respectively. Daniel Ricciardo finished ninth, just ahead of Lance Stroll, who was pressured to the line by his Aston Martin teammate Sebastian Vettel.

=== Race classification ===
Pos.	No.	Driver	Constructor	Laps	Time/Retired	Grid	Points
1	1	(Netherlands) Max Verstappen	Red Bull Racing-RBPT	53	1:30:02.112	2	25
2	44	(United Kingdom) Lewis Hamilton	Mercedes	53	+10.587	4	18
3	63	(United Kingdom) George Russell	Mercedes	53	+16.495	6	15
4	11	(Mexico) Sergio Pérez	Red Bull Racing-RBPT	53	+17.310	3	12
5	55	(Spain) Carlos Sainz Jr.	Ferrari	53	+28.872	19	11^{a}
6	14	(Spain) Fernando Alonso	Alpine-Renault	53	+42.879	7	8
7	4	(United Kingdom) Lando Norris	McLaren-Mercedes	53	+52.026	5	6
8	31	(France) Esteban Ocon	Alpine-Renault	53	+56.959	10	4
9	3	(Australia) Daniel Ricciardo	McLaren-Mercedes	53	+1:00.372	9	2
10	18	(Canada) Lance Stroll	Aston Martin Aramco-Mercedes	53	+1:02.549	15	1
11	5	(Germany) Sebastian Vettel	Aston Martin Aramco-Mercedes	53	+1:04.494	12	
12	10	(France) Pierre Gasly	AlphaTauri-RBPT	53	+1:05.448	14	
13	23	(Thailand) Alexander Albon	Williams-Mercedes	53	+1:08.565	13	
14	77	(Finland) Valtteri Bottas	Alfa Romeo-Ferrari	53	+1:16.666	11	
15	47	(Germany) Mick Schumacher	Haas-Ferrari	53	+1:20.394	17	
16^{b}	24	(China) Zhou Guanyu	Alfa Romeo-Ferrari	47	Power unit^{b}	16	
Ret	6	(Canada) Nicholas Latifi	Williams-Mercedes	40	Collision damage	18	
Ret	20	(Denmark) Kevin Magnussen	Haas-Ferrari	37	Collision damage	20	
Ret	16	(Monaco) Charles Leclerc	Ferrari	17	Accident	1	
Ret	22	(Japan) Yuki Tsunoda	AlphaTauri-RBPT	17	Undertray	8	
Fastest lap: (Spain) Carlos Sainz Jr. (Ferrari) – 1:35.781 (lap 51)

Notes

- ^a – Includes one point for fastest lap.
- ^b – Zhou Guanyu was classified as he completed more than 90% of the race distance. He also received a five-second time penalty for causing a collision with Mick Schumacher. His final position was not affected by the penalty.

== Championship standings after the race ==
Drivers' Championship standings

Pos.	Driver	Points
1	(Netherlands) Max Verstappen	233
2	(Monaco) Charles Leclerc	170
3	(Mexico) Sergio Pérez	163
4	(Spain) Carlos Sainz Jr.	144
5	(United Kingdom) George Russell	143

Constructors' Championship standings

	Pos.	Constructor	Points
	1	(Austria) Red Bull Racing-RBPT	396
	2	(Italy) Ferrari	314
	3	(Germany) Mercedes	270
1	4	(France) Alpine-Renault	93
1	5	(United Kingdom) McLaren-Mercedes	89

- Note: Only the top five positions are included for both sets of standings.

== See also ==
- 2022 Le Castellet Formula 2 round
- 2022 W Series Le Castellet round

Previous race: 2022 Austrian Grand Prix	FIA Formula One World Championship; 2022 season	Next race: 2022 Hungarian Grand Prix
Previous race: 2021 French Grand Prix	French Grand Prix	Next race: N/A
