= Alpine A523 =

2023 Formula One season car

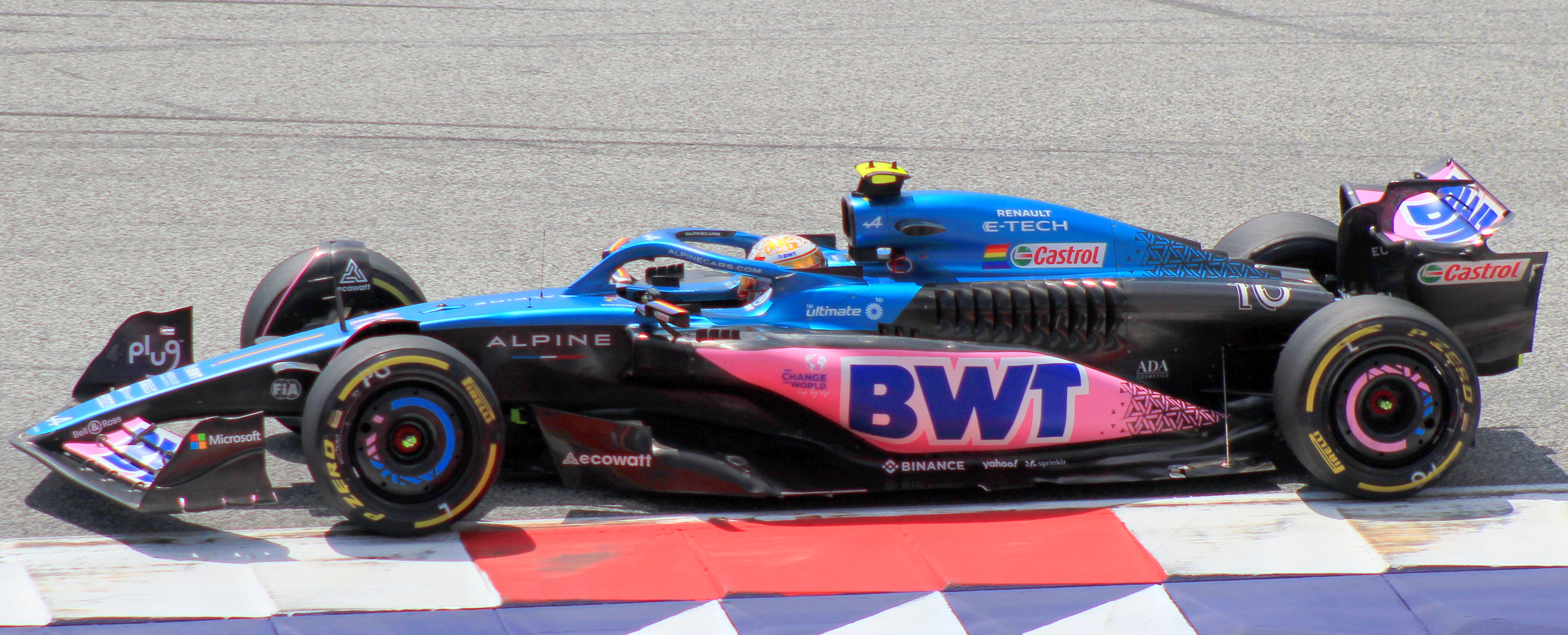
- Pierre Gasly driving an A523 during the Austrian Grand Prix.
- Category: Formula One
- Constructor: Alpine (chassis); Renault (power unit)
- Designers: Pat Fry (Chief Technical Officer); Matt Harman (Technical Director); Simon Virrill (Chief Engineer - Technical); Benjamin Norton (Chief Engineer - Car Design); Steven Booth (Head of Engineering); Peter Marshall (Deputy Head of Engineering); Pierre Genon (Head of Performance Systems); Richard Frith (Head of Vehicle Performance); Dirk de Beer (Head of Aerodynamics); James Rodgers (Chief Aerodynamicist); Bruno Famin (Engine Technical Director)
- Predecessor: Alpine A522
- Successor: Alpine A524

Technical specifications
- Suspension (front): Double wishbone push-rod
- Suspension (rear): Double wishbone push-rod
- Engine: Mecachrome-built and assembled Renault E-Tech RE23 1.6 L (98 cu in) direct injection V6 turbocharged engine limited to 15,000 RPM in a mid-mounted, rear-wheel drive layout 1.6 L (98 cu in) Turbo Rear-mid mounted
- Electric motor: Kinetic and thermal energy recovery systems
- Fuel: BP
- Lubricants: Castrol
- Tyres: Pirelli P Zero (Dry/Slick); Pirelli Cinturato (Wet/Treaded)

Competition history
- Notable entrants: BWT Alpine F1 Team
- Notable drivers: 10. Pierre Gasly; 31. Esteban Ocon
- Debut: 2023 Bahrain Grand Prix
- Last event: 2023 Abu Dhabi Grand Prix
Races	Wins	Podiums	Poles	F/Laps
22	0	2	0	0

The Alpine A523 is a Formula One racing car designed and constructed by the BWT Alpine F1 Team for the 2023 Formula One World Championship. The car was driven by Pierre Gasly, in his first season for the Enstone-based team, and Esteban Ocon.

== Design and development ==
The A523 was first revealed on 16 February 2023 alongside a special pink livery for the first three races of the season. In advance of the launch, Alpine ran the car through 17 laps shared between Gasly and Ocon at the Silverstone Circuit. The car shared several design cues with the AlphaTauri AT03, where push-rod rear suspension was used in lieu of the A522's equivalent pull-rod suspension design, as well as rectangular sidepod inlets, flat-shaped nose, and a raised front wing central section.

== Season summary ==
=== Opening rounds ===
Ocon qualified 9th for the season opener in Bahrain whilst Gasly qualified 20th and last for his debut with Alpine after having his lap time deleted for track limits. During the race itself, he recovered to finish 9th after a strategy, holding the fastest lap before Zhou Guanyu pitted and went quicker than him. Meanwhile, Ocon had a bad first race of the season, receiving three different time penalties throughout the race, eventually being retired by his team to save his engine. Alpine left Bahrain 6th in the constructors' championship with 2 points. Ocon qualified 7th for the Saudi Arabian Grand Prix with Gasly qualifying 10th. At the start of the race, Gasly made contact with Oscar Piastri, but did not receive damage. Gasly and Ocon were both passed by Max Verstappen and Charles Leclerc who were recovering from bad qualifying, but both dropped two places when the safety car came out due to Lance Stroll's retirement. The two could not keep up with the top 4 drivers, so Ocon and Gasly finished 8th and 9th respectively with Ocon scoring his first points of the season. Alpine left Jeddah 5th in the constructors' championship with 8 points.

Ocon qualified 11th for the Australian Grand Prix, with Gasly qualifying 9th. At the start, Gasly jumped into 7th before the safety car came out. Ocon, however, slipped back to 15th place after a poor start. When Alex Albon crashed on lap 7, Gasly and Ocon both stayed out and were able to change tyres under the red flag. Gasly and Ocon took the restart 4th and 13th respectively, but Ocon was hit by Nyck de Vries at turn 3, dropping him down the order. Gasly ran in the top 10 for a long time while Ocon made his way back up the order, sitting 10th on lap 54 when another red flag came out due to Kevin Magnussen's crash. At the restart, Ocon moved up to 7th whilst Gasly ran wide at turn 1. However, the race soon turned into disaster as Gasly, in an attempt to rejoin the track, moved right across the track at turn 2, but failed to notice Ocon on his right with Gasly's rear left and Ocon's front left tyres interlocking, causing Gasly to spin into the wall, dragging Ocon along with him in a heavy crash for both drivers. After both left their cars, Ocon said he had a headache from the accident whilst Gasly was apologetic for the incident. The stewards declared the collision a racing incident, meaning neither driver was penalised; however, due to McLaren's double points finish, Alpine slipped to 6th in the constructors' championship still on 8 points.

For the first sprint weekend in Baku, Ocon qualified 12th while Gasly crashed in Q1, meaning he would start 19th. Ocon qualified 13th for the sprint with Gasly qualifying 19th again. Ocon finished the sprint 18th after starting from the pit lane due to suspension set up changes while Gasly finished 13th. Gasly finished the main race 14th whilst Ocon again started from the pit lane for the main race forcing the team to try a strategy of waiting for a late safety car, but no such safety car occurred. The team waited until the final lap to pit Ocon, but as Ocon entered the pit lane, he was forced to avoid some photographers who were crossing the road. After his stop, Ocon finished 15th behind Gasly. The FIA investigated the pit incident and changed the parc fermé procedure to avoid another incident like that happening again. Alpine left Baku 6th in the constructors' championship with 8 points 6 behind 5th placed McLaren.

Gasly qualified 5th for the 2023 Miami Grand Prix with Ocon qualifying 9th, and Gasly finished the race 8th with Ocon finishing 9th. Ocon qualified 4th at Monaco, but was promoted to third due to Leclerc's grid penalty, with Gasly qualifying 7th. On lap 14 Carlos Sainz Jr. tried to overtake Ocon at the Nouvelle chicane, but collided with Ocon, breaking his front wing. Ocon held third during the first round of pitstops, but late rain threatened his bid for a podium as he dropped behind George Russell, but he regained third when Russell went off at Mirabeau. Gasly undercut Sainz and sat between the two Ferraris after the switch to intermediates in 7th, where he would finish. Ocon, however, held off Lewis Hamilton to finish in third place, taking his first podium since his win at the 2021 Hungarian Grand Prix and Alpine's first podium of the season. Ocon was awarded driver of the day for his performance. After the race Alpine moved back into 5th in the constructors' championship on 35 points, 18 points ahead of McLaren but 55 points behind 4th placed Ferrari. Gasly qualified 4th for the Spanish Grand Prix with Ocon qualifying 7th, and Ocon finished 8th with Gasly finishing 10th.

Ocon qualified 6th in Canada while Gasly qualified 17th after being impeded on his last lap in Q1 by Sainz. Ocon finished the race 8th, despite being held up by Albon for the last third of the race, with Gasly finishing 12th. Gasly qualified 9th for the Austrian Grand Prix with Ocon qualifying 12th, and Ocon qualified 9th for the sprint with Gasly qualifying 12th. Gasly finished the sprint in 15th whilst Ocon finished 7th finishing 0.0009 seconds ahead of Russell. Gasly finished the main race 10th while Ocon had a miserable race after receiving 5 separate penalties totalling 30 seconds for track limits offences and an unsafe release. This broke the record for the most penalties in a single race previously held by Pastor Maldonado.

Gasly qualified 10th for the British Grand Prix with Ocon qualifying 13th. The race went miserably for Alpine as Ocon retired on lap 12 due to a hydraulic leak whilst Gasly retired late in the race after Stroll collided with him at the Vale chicane. Even though Stroll was penalised for the collision, Alpine suffered a double retirement and due to McLaren's 2nd and 4th places the Woking team passed Alpine in the constructors' championship meaning they dropped back to 6th in the standings.

Alpine finished the first 10 races 6th in the constructors' championship with 47 points. Ocon was 11th in the drivers' championship with 31 points whilst Gasly was 12th in the standings with 16 points.

=== Hungary to Japan ===
Gasly qualified thirteenth and Ocon twelfth at the Hungarian Grand Prix, but both would suffer a pointless finish and lap-one elimination due to Zhou running into a returning Daniel Ricciardo, pushing the Australian AlphaTauri driver into Ocon and right into Gasly's path.

After an uneventful Belgian sprint for Ocon, who qualified ninth and stayed there with Gasly, who had qualified sixth, scoring a podium in third place behind a once-more dominant Verstappen and a fledgling Piastri, Ocon finished eighth and Gasly eleventh in the main race. After a chaotic race, Gasly would score the team's other podium of the season in third after qualifying twelfth at Zandvoort, while Ocon finished tenth after qualifying seventeenth.

After the highs of Zandvoort, Monza proved to be a disaster for the French duo. Both Alpines failed to make it out of Q1 at the 2023 Italian Grand Prix. Gasly finished fifteenth, and Ocon retired due to an issue with his steering. At the Singapore Grand Prix, Ocon qualified in eighth and Gasly twelfth; while Gasly finished sixth, Ocon's gearbox failed on him on lap 42, causing him to retire and bringing out a virtual safety car. At the Japanese Grand Prix, Ocon qualified fourteenth and Gasly twelfth, and would finish the race in ninth and tenth respectively.

=== Closing rounds ===
Gasly and Ocon qualified seventh and eighth at the Qatar Grand Prix, and eleventh and tenth for the sprint respectively. During the sprint itself, Ocon locked up and began a domino effect that led to a racing incident where Ocon, Sergio Pérez and Nico Hülkenberg crashed out of the race, with Pérez in particular being mathematically eliminated from championship contention. Meanwhile, Gasly finished in ninth, marking a pointless sprint finish for the duo. During the race, Gasly finished twelfth and Ocon seventh. Gasly, who initially finished tenth, was bemoaned with two track limits violations and a five-second penalty.

== Complete Formula One results ==
Key

Key
Colour	Result
Gold	Winner
Silver	Second place
Bronze	Third place
Green	Other points position
Blue	Other classified position
Blue	Not classified, finished (NC)
Purple	Not classified, retired (Ret)
Red	Did not qualify (DNQ)
Black	Disqualified (DSQ)
White	Did not start (DNS)
White	Race cancelled (C)
Blank	Did not practice (DNP)
Blank	Excluded (EX)
Blank	Did not arrive (DNA)
Blank	Withdrawn (WD)
Blank	Did not enter (empty cell)
Annotation	Meaning
P	Pole position
F	Fastest lap
Superscript number	Points-scoring position in sprint

Year	Entrant	Power unit	Tyres	Driver name	Grands Prix																						Points	WCC pos.
Year	Entrant	Power unit	Tyres	Driver name	BHR	SAU	AUS	AZE	MIA	MON	ESP	CAN	AUT	GBR	HUN	BEL	NED	ITA	SIN	JPN	QAT	USA	MXC	SAP	LVG	ABU	Points	WCC pos.
2023	BWT Alpine F1 Team	Renault E-Tech RE23	P	(France) Pierre Gasly	9	9	13†	14	8	7	10	12	10	18†	Ret	11^{3}	3	15	6	10	12	6^{7}	11	7	11	13	120	6th
2023	BWT Alpine F1 Team	Renault E-Tech RE23	P	(France) Esteban Ocon	Ret	8	14†	15	9	3	8	8	14^{7}	Ret	Ret	8	10	Ret	Ret	9	7	Ret	10	10	4	12	120	6th
