= Alpine A524 =

2024 Formula One car

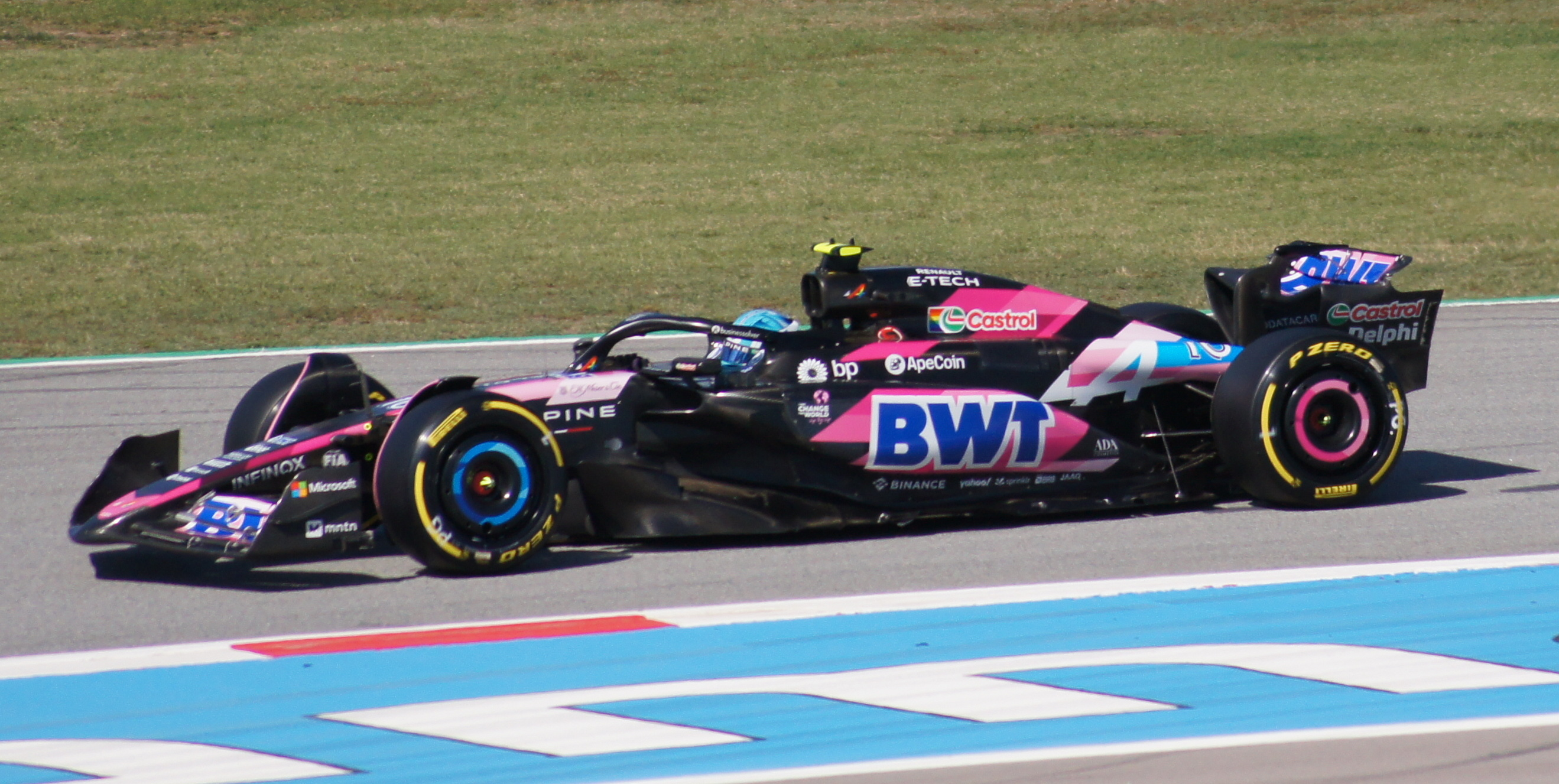
- An A524 driven by Pierre Gasly during the Spanish Grand Prix
- Category: Formula One
- Designers: Matthew Harman (Technical Director); Simon Virrill (Chief Engineer - Technical); Benjamin Norton (Chief Engineer - Car Design); Steven Booth (Head of Engineering); Pierre Genon (Head of Performance Systems); Richard Frith (Head of Vehicle Performance); Dirk de Beer (Head of Aerodynamics); James Rodgers (Chief Aerodynamicist); Eric Meignan (Engine Technical Director)
- Predecessor: Alpine A523
- Successor: Alpine A525

Technical specifications
- Suspension (front): Double wishbone push-rod
- Suspension (rear): Double wishbone push-rod
- Engine: Mecachrome-built and assembled Renault E-Tech RE24 1.6 L (98 cu in) direct injection V6 turbocharged engine limited to 15,000 RPM in a mid-mounted, rear-wheel drive layout 1.6 L (98 cu in) Turbo Rear-mid mounted
- Electric motor: Kinetic and thermal energy recovery systems
- Fuel: BP
- Lubricants: Castrol
- Tyres: Pirelli P Zero (Dry/Slick); Pirelli Cinturato (Wet/Treaded)

Competition history
- Notable entrants: BWT Alpine F1 Team
- Notable drivers: 10. (France) Pierre Gasly; 31. (France) Esteban Ocon; 61. (Australia) Jack Doohan
- Debut: 2024 Bahrain Grand Prix
- Last event: 2024 Abu Dhabi Grand Prix
Races	Wins	Podiums	Poles	F/Laps
24	0	2	0	1

The Alpine A524 is a Formula One racing car designed and developed by the Alpine F1 Team. It competed in the 2024 Formula One World Championship. It was the fourth Formula One car entered by Alpine since rebranding from Renault. The A524 was driven by Pierre Gasly, Esteban Ocon and Jack Doohan, the latter of whom replaced Ocon at the season finale Abu Dhabi Grand Prix after Ocon ended his final season with the team early. Reserve driver duties were previously handled by Doohan, as he had driven in first practice for the Canadian and British Grands Prix in the year. Initially considered to be the worst-running car of the field at the beginning of the year, the team's results steadily improved throughout the season to return to the midfield. The car managed to score Alpine's first fastest lap at the United States Grand Prix, and the team's first double podium at the São Paulo Grand Prix, which was also the team's first podium of the season.

The A524 would be the last Alpine Formula One car to sport the BP fuels and Castrol lubricants logos before switching to Eni sponsorship from the 2025 season onwards due to BP plc switching its allegiances to the new Audi Sport F1 Team from the 2026 season onwards, however Alpine continued to use unbranded BP fuel and Castrol products for 2025 season.

== History ==
Alpine unveiled the car at a launch event at their factory at Enstone on 7 February 2024, alongside the Alpine A424 sports prototype racing car. It sported a mostly bare carbon livery, with streaks of blue and pink across the car. Two liveries were released, a traditional blue one and a pink one in partnership with title sponsors BWT. It originally sported little colour, but from pre-season testing onwards, a blue arrow was added across the front nose cone. The pink livery was unchanged. The car made its first appearance at the 2024 Bahrain Grand Prix. The car's weaknesses were observed to be a lack of traction, a lack of downforce, and it being 11 kilograms heavier than the 798 kg minimum. This extra weight came from an attempt to strengthen the monocoque, which had failed its lateral load test. A lighter chassis appeared at the Chinese Grand Prix.

== Season summary ==
=== Opening rounds ===
The Alpine A524's performance on track compared to previous cars was immediately deemed to be lacking at the Bahrain Grand Prix, locking out the last two places on the grid during qualifying and finishing seventeenth and eighteenth behind Valtteri Bottas, who had suffered a slow pit stop, and Logan Sargeant. Alpine's woes continued into the Saudi Arabian Grand Prix with both drivers once again suffering a Q1 knockout with Ocon in seventeenth and Gasly eighteenth. While Gasly retired after the formation lap due to a gearbox problem, Ocon finished in thirteenth. At the Australian Grand Prix, Ocon made it to Q2 but was only able to qualify in fifteenth, and Gasly was knocked out of Q1 once again in seventeenth. Gasly finished in thirteenth and Ocon sixteenth - last on track after George Russell retired, with Gasly receiving a five-second time penalty for crossing the pit exit line. The Japanese Grand Prix saw Ocon qualify fifteenth once again with Gasly in seventeenth, with both drivers finishing fifteenth and sixteenth respectively.

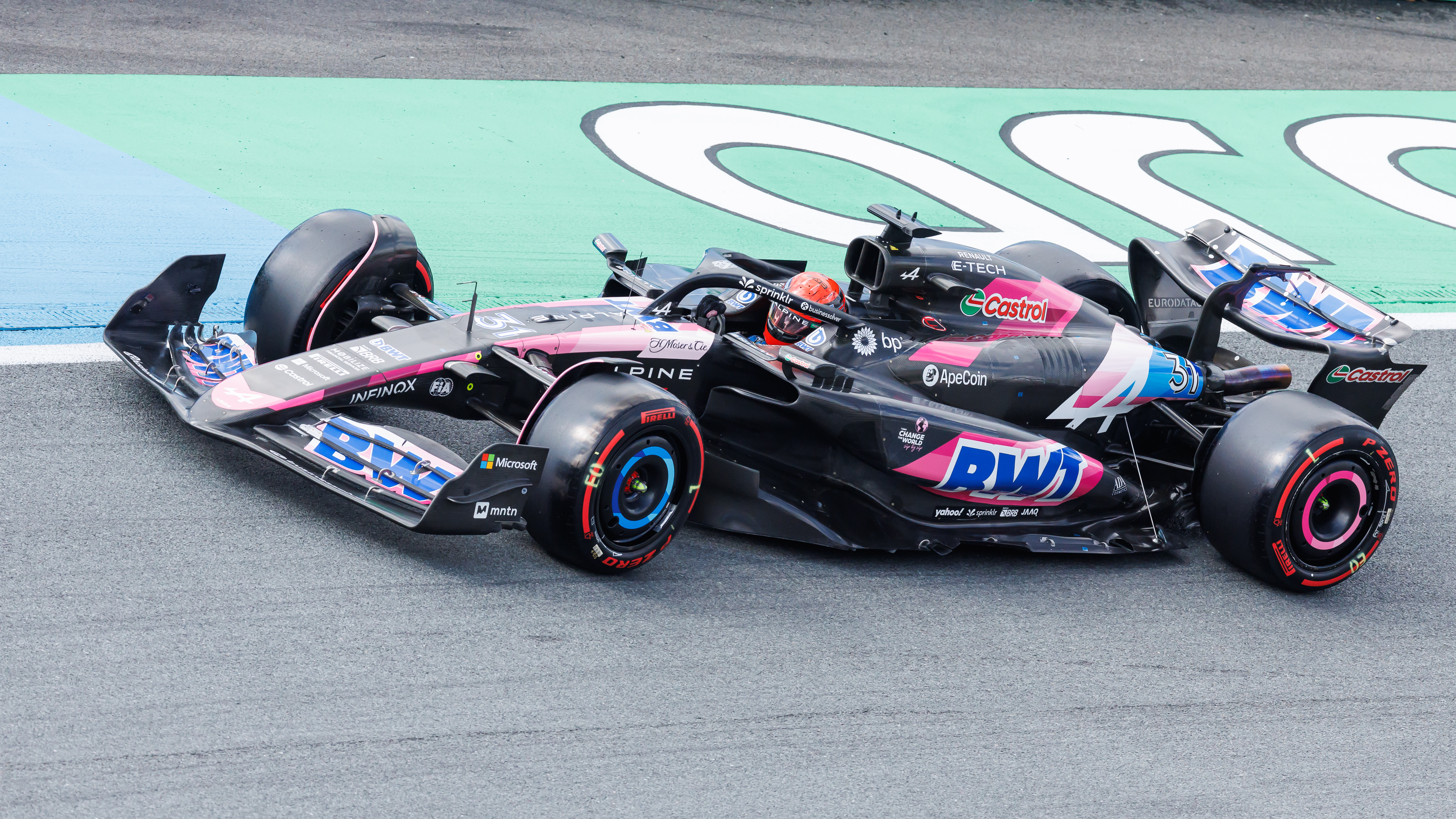
Ocon at the Dutch Grand Prix

The first sprint weekend of the Chinese Grand Prix saw Gasly and Ocon qualify sixteenth and seventeenth respectively, with Ocon finishing thirteenth and Gasly fifteenth. Both Alpines made it into Q2 for qualifying for the main race, with Ocon, who qualified thirteenth, finishing eleventh and Gasly, who qualified fifteenth, finishing thirteenth.

At the sprint qualifying for the Miami Grand Prix, Gasly and Ocon qualified for sixteenth and thirteenth respectively. Ocon would finish fifteenth and Gasly would finish ninth. Both Alpines made it into Q2 for qualifying for the main race. Gasly, who qualified twelfth, would remain in position for the race. Ocon, who qualified thirteenth, would finish in tenth, giving Alpine's first point finish of the season.

At the start of the Monaco Grand Prix, the two Alpines collided while exiting Portier. Ocon squeezed himself into the path of Gasly, pitching the former's car upward. The former admitted responsibility for the incident, retired during the red flag period. Gasly went on to score his first points of the season with a P10 finish. After the Monaco Grand Prix, it was announced that Ocon would be leaving Alpine at the end of the season. He went on to join Haas for the 2025 Formula One World Championship.

=== Mid-season ===
The Canadian and Spanish Grands Prix saw double points finishes for the team with Gasly securing two P9s and Ocon two P10s. On the weekend of the Austrian Grand Prix, Gasly announced that he would be continuing to race for Alpine for "beyond 2025". In the British Grand Prix weekend, Jack Doohan drove Gasly's car for Free Practice 1. Gasly was also penalized for exceeding his quota of power units per season, and would have started from the back of the grid. However, due to the gearbox issue he did not start the race. Ocon finished P16. Hungary was also a poor weekend for the team, with Gasly once again starting from the pit lane due to replacing PU elements in parc femmé conditions without approval, and retired from the race due to a suspected hydraulics leak. Ocon finishing P18. In Belgium, Ocon securing a P9 finish, and Gasly secured one in the Dutch Grand Prix next weekend. This weekend was also when Doohan was announced to be partnering Gasly for the 2025 Championship. The next four races saw no points finishes for the team, although Ocon did secure the fastest lap in the United States Grand Prix held in Austin. In the Mexican Grand Prix, Gasly secured a P10 finish.

=== Closing rounds ===
Following a low run of scores, Alpine headed into the 2024 São Paulo Grand Prix with a tally of 14 points and 9th in the constructors. However with a rain-affected weekend, it saw Team Enstone finish P2 with Esteban Ocon and P3 with Pierre Gasly and an additional 2 points for a P7 sprint race finish for Gasly. They ended up rounding the weekend with a tally of 35 points and skyrocketing the team to 6th in the constructors, which they successfully defended from Haas and RB in the final 3 races of the season. Gasly's sudden rise in form helped the team defend from rivals, going pointless in Las Vegas but making ground in Qatar and Abu Dhabi with P5 and P7 finishes respectively.

The season finale in Abu Dhabi saw Pierre Gasly partner with rookie Jack Doohan, in a late season driver swap. Ocon was dropped with one race remaining in order to free him to drive for his new team, Haas, in the post season Pirelli test.

== Sponsorship and livery ==
Other than the addition of an additional blue/pink arrow on the front nose cone after pre-season testing, and a rainbow gradient across the halo at the Austrian Grand Prix for Pride Month, Alpine's livery remained mostly the same. Much like previous years since 2022, Alpine competed in a pink livery for title sponsors BWT, and instead of only being restricted to the first few races of the season, the pink livery was used for more races throughout the season. The pink livery was used in Bahrain, Saudi Arabia, Australia, Spain, Austria, the Netherlands, Azerbaijan and São Paulo. Alpine raced an all-pink BWT livery for the final three races of the season.

In addition to the aforementioned BWT all-pink livery, two other special liveries were used by Alpine to promote their investors and sponsors. For the Belgian Grand Prix, Alpine raced with a Deadpool livery to promote the Deadpool & Wolverine film, which stars and was produced by investor Ryan Reynolds' production company and for the United States Grand Prix, Alpine raced with an Indiana Jones livery to promote the Indiana Jones and the Great Circle game, which involved Microsoft subsidiary Xbox.

== Complete Formula One results ==
(key)

Year	Entrant	Power unit	Tyres	Driver name	Grands Prix																								Points	WCC pos.
Year	Entrant	Power unit	Tyres	Driver name	BHR	SAU	AUS	JPN	CHN	MIA	EMI	MON	CAN	ESP	AUT	GBR	HUN	BEL	NED	ITA	AZE	SIN	USA	MXC	SAP	LVG	QAT	ABU	Points	WCC pos.
2024	BWT Alpine F1 Team	Renault E-Tech RE24	P	(France) Pierre Gasly	18	Ret	13	16	13	12	16	10	9	9	10	DNS	Ret	13	9	15	12	17	12	10	3^{7}	Ret	5	7	65	6th
2024	BWT Alpine F1 Team	Renault E-Tech RE24	P	(France) Esteban Ocon	17	13	16	15	11	10	14	Ret	10	10	12	16	18	9	15	14	15	13	18^{F}	13	2	17	Ret		65	6th
2024	BWT Alpine F1 Team	Renault E-Tech RE24	P	(Australia) Jack Doohan																								15	65	6th
