= Alpine A522 =

2022 Formula One racing car

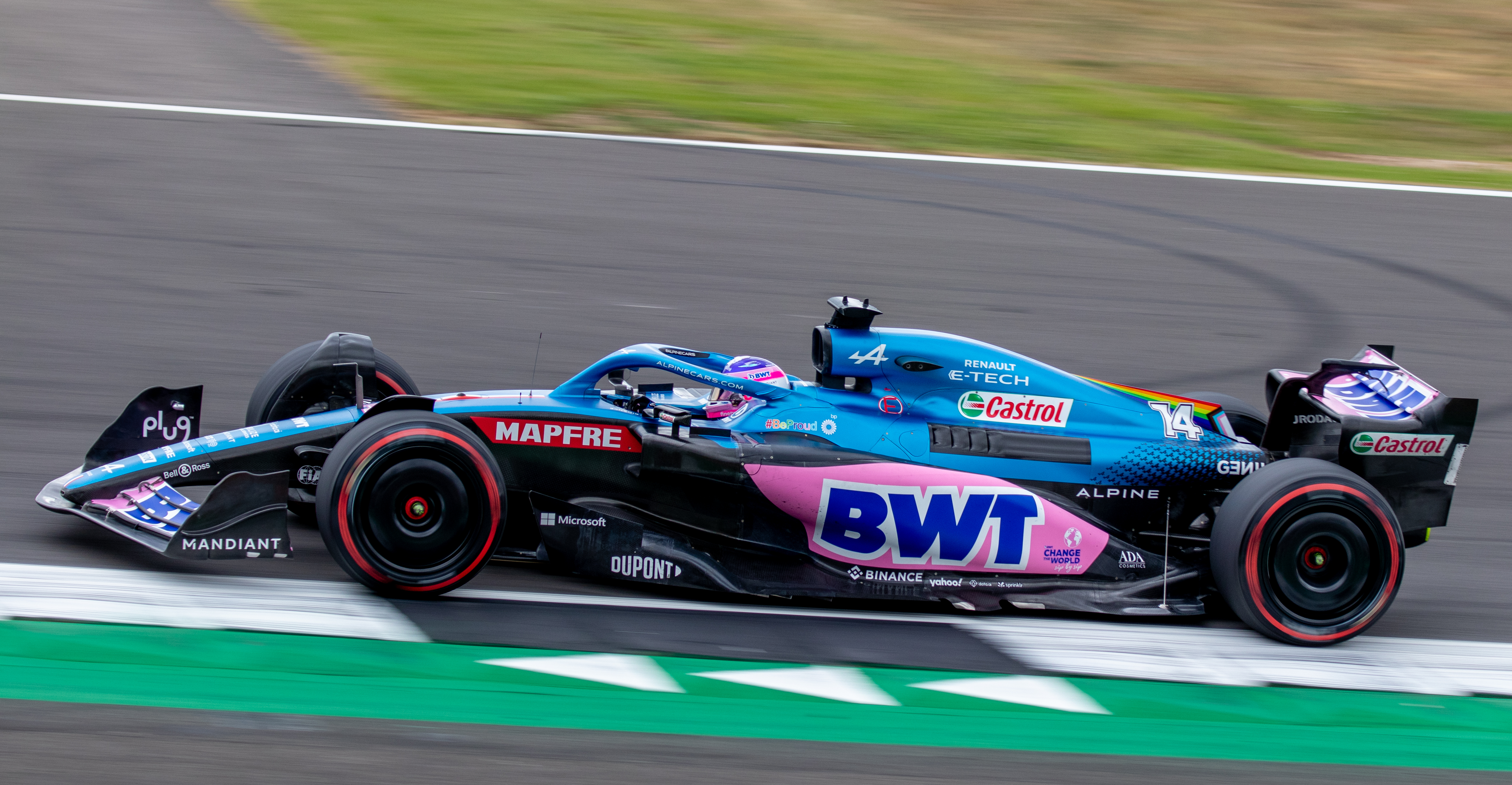
- Fernando Alonso in the Alpine A522 at the British Grand Prix
- Category: Formula One
- Constructor: Alpine
- Designers: Pat Fry (Chief Technical Officer); Matt Harman (Technical Director); Naoki Tokunaga (Chief Transformation Officer); Simon Virrill (Chief Engineer - Technical); Steve Booth (Chief Engineer - Car Design); Benjamin Norton (Deputy Chief Designer); Pierre Genon (Head of Performance Systems); Dirk de Beer (Head of Aerodynamics); James Rodgers (Chief Aerodynamicist); Bruno Famin (Engine Technical Director)
- Predecessor: Alpine A521
- Successor: Alpine A523

Technical specifications
- Suspension (front): Double wishbone push-rod
- Suspension (rear): Double wishbone pull-rod
- Engine: Mecachrome-built and assembled Renault E-Tech RE22 1.6 L (98 cu in) direct injection V6 turbocharged engine limited to 15,000 RPM in a mid-mounted, rear-wheel drive layout 1.6 L (98 cu in) Turbo Rear-mid mounted
- Electric motor: Kinetic and thermal energy recovery systems
- Power: More than 950 hp (710 kW)
- Fuel: BP
- Lubricants: Castrol
- Tyres: Pirelli P Zero (Dry/Slick); Pirelli Cinturato (Wet/Treaded)

Competition history
- Notable entrants: BWT Alpine F1 Team
- Notable drivers: 14. (Spain) Fernando Alonso; 31. (France) Esteban Ocon
- Debut: 2022 Bahrain Grand Prix
- Last event: 2022 Abu Dhabi Grand Prix
Races	Wins	Podiums	Poles	F/Laps
22	0	0	0	0

The Alpine A522 is a Formula One car designed and constructed by the BWT Alpine F1 Team and competed in the 2022 Formula One World Championship. The car was driven by Fernando Alonso and Esteban Ocon. The chassis is Alpine's first car under the 2022 technical regulations.

== Competition history ==
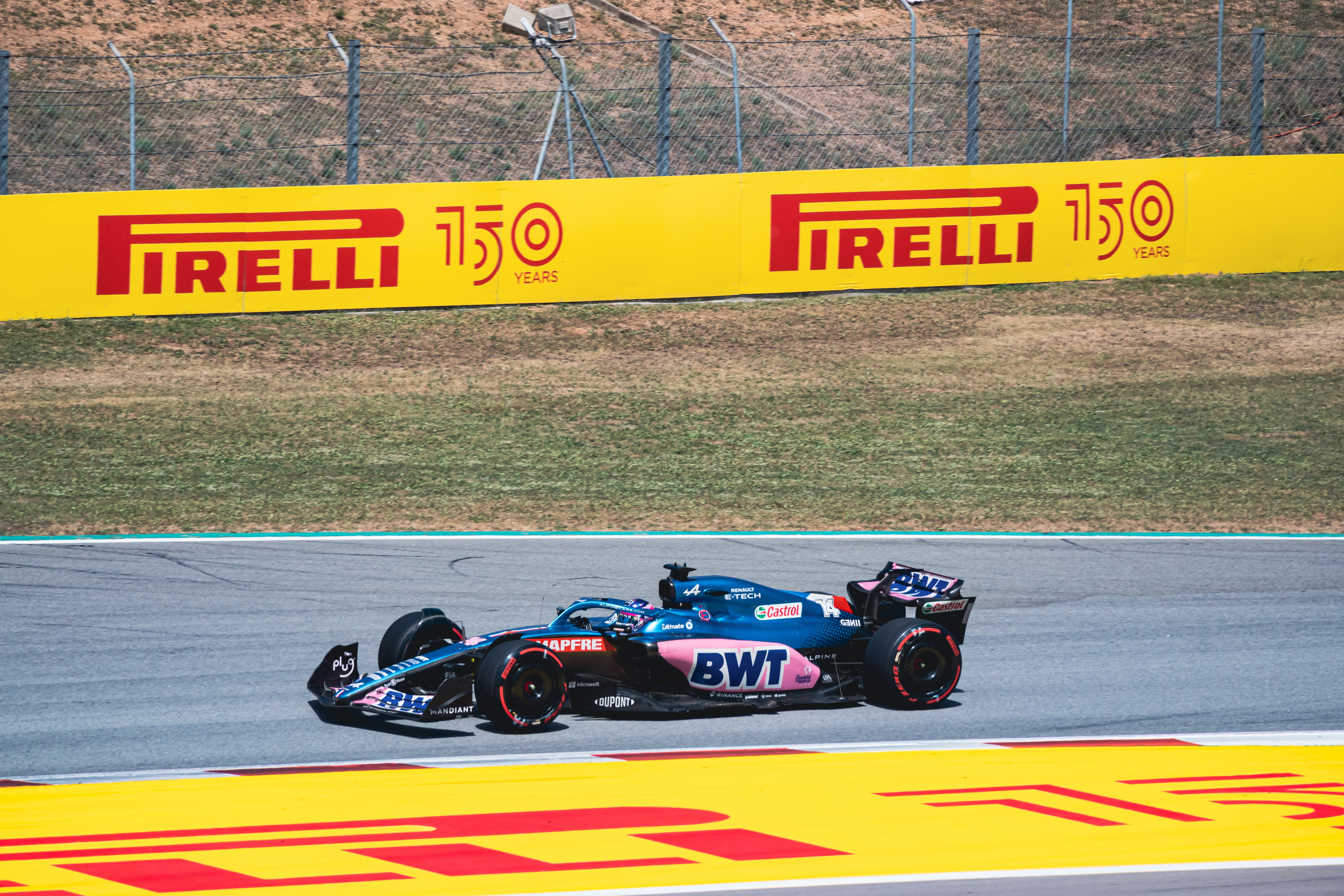
Alonso at the Spanish Grand Prix

The car was generally about as competitive as its predecessor, the A521, and was regularly in the hunt for points at races, but not usually troubling the top teams. One of the car's key strengths is its top speed, which was particularly evident in races such as Baku, where it was noted that other cars could not catch the A522 on the straightaways, despite the advantage of DRS. The team had reliability problems in several races, however the team beat McLaren to 4th in the constructors' championship - their best finish since 2018.

== Sponsorship and livery ==
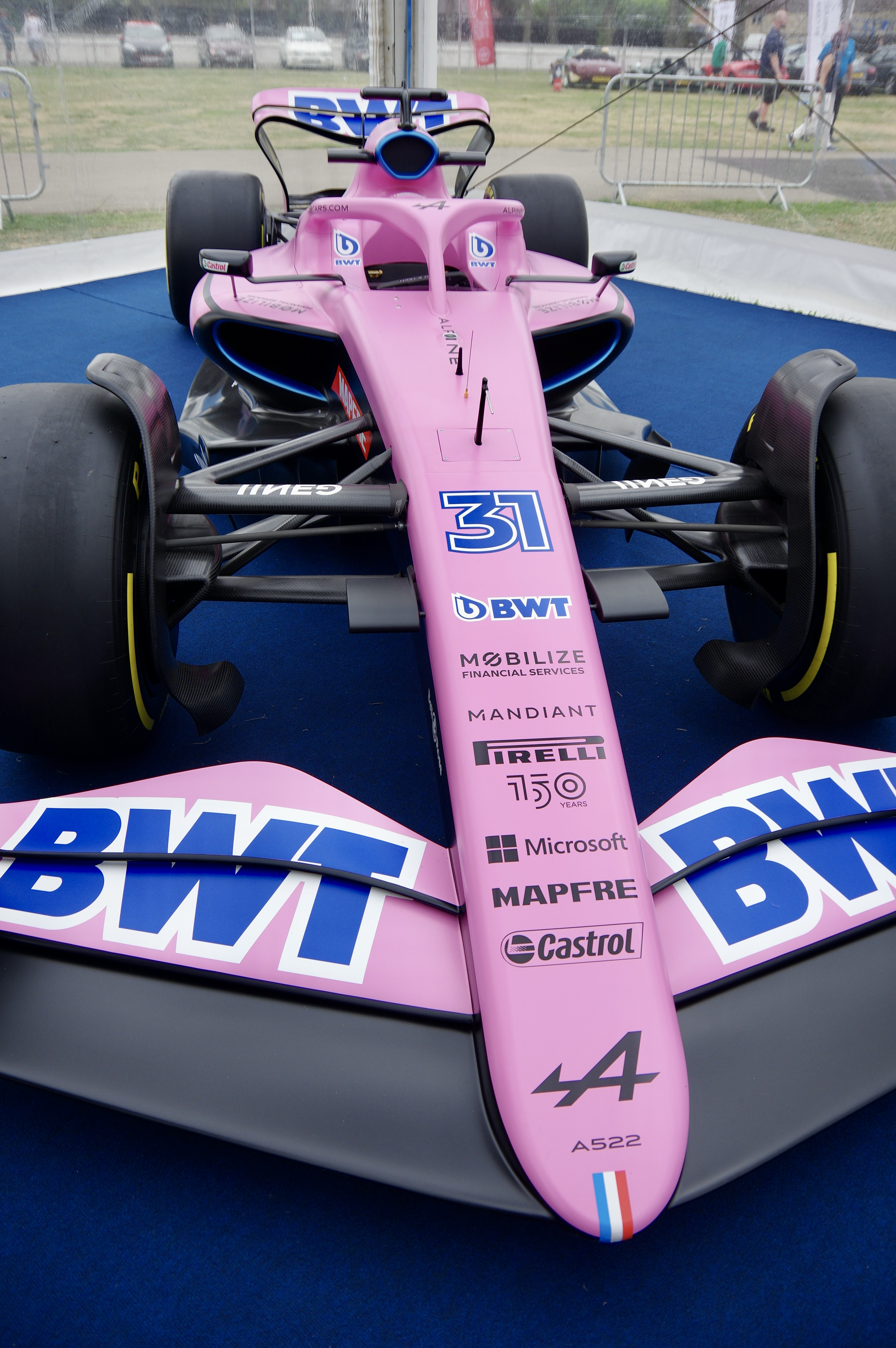
The "pink" livery of the A522 on display during the Silverstone Classic

To mark the start of the sponsorship deal between Alpine and BWT, the A522 competed in the first two races of the season, in Bahrain and Saudi Arabia, in pink livery, completely replacing the usual blue livery.

== Racing Pride ==
In June 2022, Racing Pride announced a partnership with Alpine, which saw Racing Pride work with Alpine on a number of initiatives to ensure their pathways for attracting emerging talent are welcoming to LGBTQ+ people, and the team pledged to show support and raise awareness and for the LGBTQ+ community. Coinciding with Pride Month 2022, the Formula 1 team also ran a special pride livery on their Alpine cars throughout the month of June, with other nods to the LGBTQ+ community throughout the team's sites.

Alpine CEO Laurent Rossi said of the partnership: "For so long, motorsport has not been representative of the diversity we see in wider society. There are various reasons, but we need to look forward and challenge the biases we see. Our journey starts here. The LGBTQ+ community has lacked visible representation and support within our industry, and we need to change this. We want Alpine to be an open, inclusive and productive place to work and for our employees to feel happy and supported in their workplace. A happy environment gives greater creativity and that is exactly what we need to foster as we move forward. To do so, we need to fully understand the challenges some of the under-represented groups in motorsport face. Pride Month is a good place to start; we know that we need to do more to give this community a voice and representation.".

== Complete Formula One results ==
Key

Key
Colour	Result
Gold	Winner
Silver	Second place
Bronze	Third place
Green	Other points position
Blue	Other classified position
Blue	Not classified, finished (NC)
Purple	Not classified, retired (Ret)
Red	Did not qualify (DNQ)
Black	Disqualified (DSQ)
White	Did not start (DNS)
White	Race cancelled (C)
Blank	Did not practice (DNP)
Blank	Excluded (EX)
Blank	Did not arrive (DNA)
Blank	Withdrawn (WD)
Blank	Did not enter (empty cell)
Annotation	Meaning
P	Pole position
F	Fastest lap
Superscript number	Points-scoring position in sprint

Year	Entrant	Power unit	Tyres	Driver name	Grands Prix																						Points	WCC pos.
Year	Entrant	Power unit	Tyres	Driver name	BHR	SAU	AUS	EMI	MIA	ESP	MON	AZE	CAN	GBR	AUT	FRA	HUN	BEL	NED	ITA	SIN	JPN	USA	MXC	SAP	ABU	Points	WCC pos.
2022	BWT Alpine F1 Team	Renault E-Tech RE22	P	(Spain) Fernando Alonso	9	Ret	17	Ret	11	9	7	7	9	5	10	6	8	5	6	Ret	Ret	7	7	19†	5	Ret	173	4th
2022	BWT Alpine F1 Team	Renault E-Tech RE22	P	(France) Esteban Ocon	7	6	7	14	8	7	12	10	6	Ret	5^{6}	8	9	7	9	11	Ret	4	11	8	8	7	173	4th
