= Zhou Guanyu =

Chinese racing driver (born 1999)

- 周冠宇
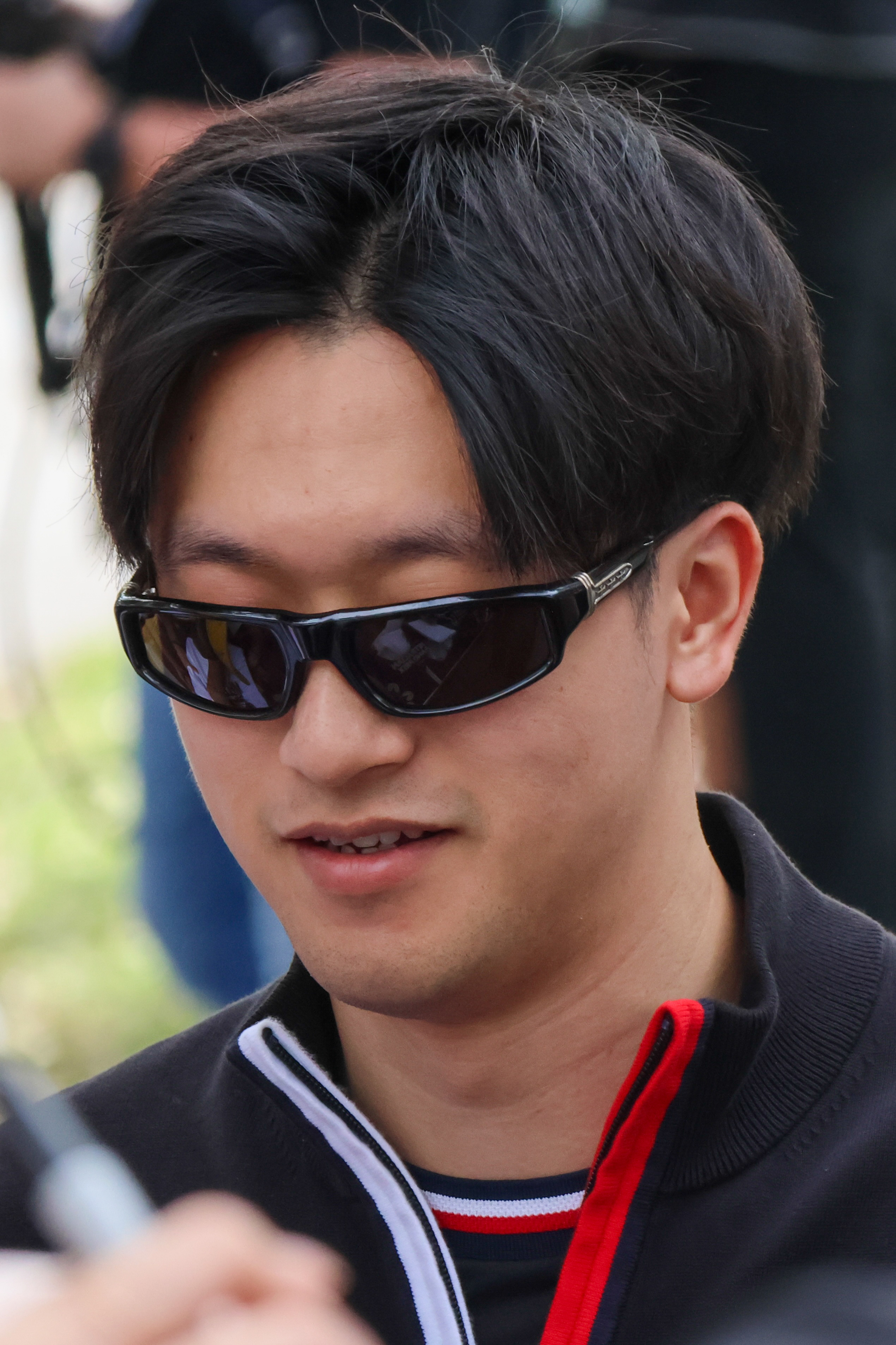
- Zhou at the 2026 Australian Grand Prix
- Born: 30 May 1999 (age 27); Shanghai, China

Formula One World Championship career
- Nationality: (China) Chinese
- Active years: 2022–2024
- Team(s): Alfa Romeo, Sauber
- Car number: 24
- Entries: 68 (68 starts)
- Championships: 0
- Wins: 0
- Podiums: 0
- Career points: 16
- Pole positions: 0
- Fastest laps: 2
- First entry: 2022 Bahrain Grand Prix
- Last entry: 2024 Abu Dhabi Grand Prix

Previous series
- 2021; 2019–2021; 2016–2018; 2016; 2015; 2014–2015: F3 Asian; FIA Formula 2; FIA F3 European; Toyota Racing Series; ADAC F4; Italian F4

Championship titles
- 2021: F3 Asian

Awards
- 2022; 2019: Autosport Rookie of the Year; Anthoine Hubert Award

Chinese name
- Traditional Chinese: 周冠宇
- Simplified Chinese: 周冠宇
Transcriptions
Standard Mandarin
- Hanyu Pinyin: Zhōu Guànyǔ
- Website: www.zhou-guanyu.com/en/

Zhou Guanyu (Chinese: 周冠宇; pinyin: Zhōu Guànyǔ, pronounced [ʈʂóʊ kwân.ỳ]; born 30 May 1999) is a Chinese racing driver who serves as a reserve driver in Formula One for Cadillac. Zhou competed in Formula One from 2022 to 2024, and remains the only Chinese driver to compete in Formula One.

Born in Shanghai, Zhou began karting aged eight before moving to Sheffield in 2012 to compete internationally. Graduating to junior formulae in 2014, Zhou finished runner-up in the 2015 Italian F4 Championship. After three seasons in the FIA Formula 3 European Championship, as well as a development driver role in Formula E for Techeetah in 2017–18, Zhou competed in the FIA Formula 2 Championship from 2019 to 2021 for Virtuosi, finishing third in his final season.

A member of the Ferrari Driver Academy from 2014 to 2018, and the Alpine Academy from 2019 to 2021, (Note: Known until 2021 as the Renault Sport Academy.) Zhou served as a test driver for Renault and Alpine in 2020 and 2021, respectively. Zhou signed for Alfa Romeo in 2022 to partner Valtteri Bottas, scoring his first career point on debut at the Bahrain Grand Prix. Retaining his seat for his 2023 campaign, he scored further points finishes in Australia, Spain and Qatar. He remained at the re-branded Sauber in 2024, where he scored the team's only points finish with the C44—at the Qatar Grand Prix—before leaving at the end of the season, having achieved two fastest laps and sixteen championship points in Formula One.

== Early and personal life ==
Zhou Guanyu was born on 30 May 1999 in Shanghai, China. Having started karting when he was eight years old in China, Zhou moved to Sheffield in 2012 for a more competitive racing environment, where he attended Westbourne School.

== Junior racing career ==
=== Karting ===
In 2013, racing with the Sheffield-based Strawberry Racing team, Zhou won both the Super 1 National Rotax Max Junior Championship and Rotax Max Euro Challenge. For his final year of karting, Zhou finished second in the Rotax Max Senior Euro Challenge and participated in selected rounds of WSK Champions Cup and the KF2 European Championship. He also made his first and only appearance in the Karting World Championship, driving for Ricky Flynn Motorsport alongside Lando Norris and Jehan Daruvala.

=== Formula 4 ===
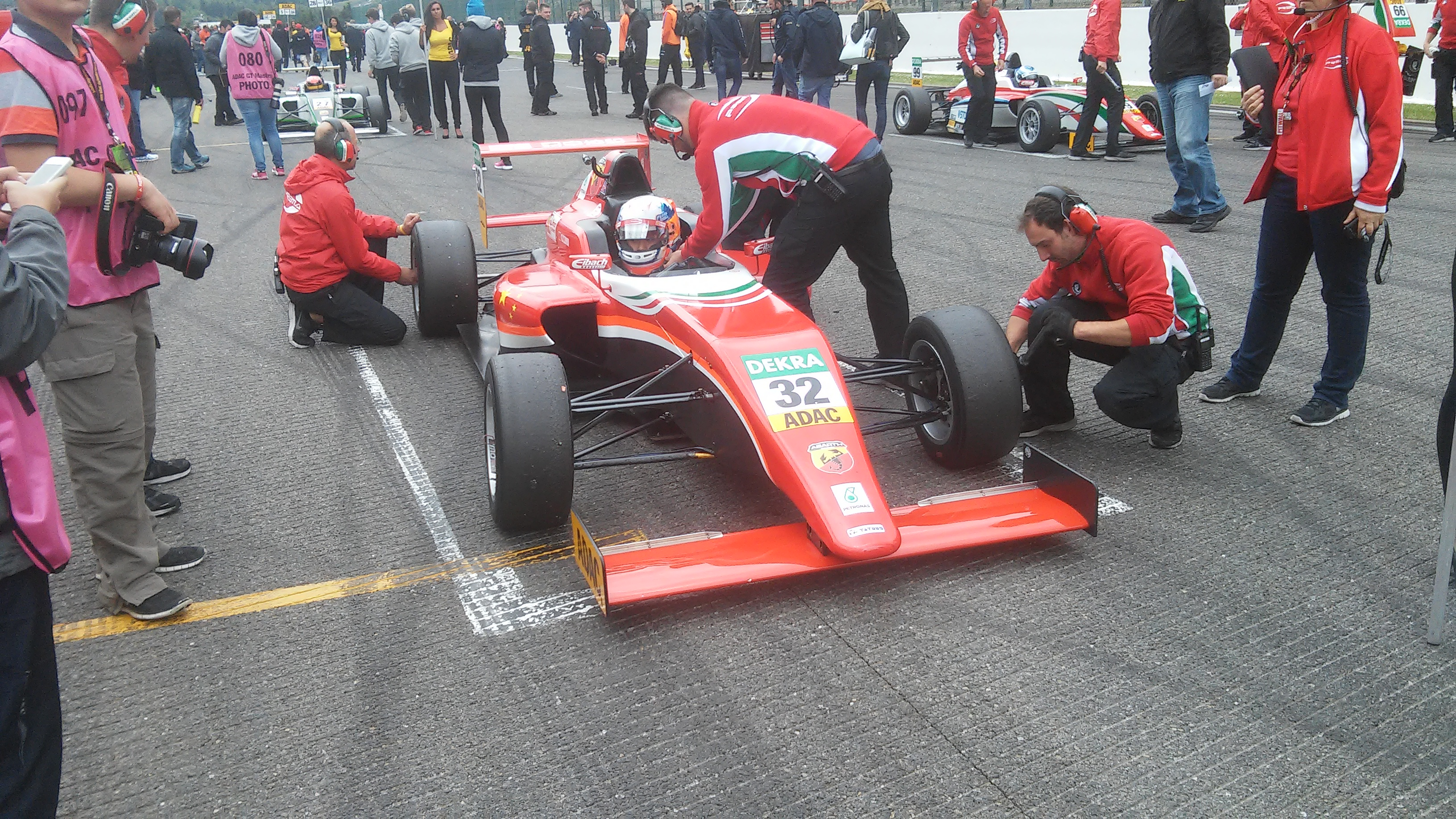
Zhou on the grid of an ADAC F4 race at Spa

Zhou joined Prema Powerteam for the 2015 Italian F4 Championship. After winning all three races in Round 2 at Monza and consistently finishing on the podium, Zhou ended the season as vice-champion and best rookie. He also competed in selected rounds of the German ADAC F4 Championship, achieving two podium finishes in Spielberg and Spa.

=== FIA Formula 3 European Championship ===
==== 2016 ====
Zhou joined team Motopark for the 2016 FIA European F3 Championship. After a successful season opener rounds in Paul Ricard and Hungaroring by finishing in two podium positions, Zhou struggled to find pace during the second half of the season, finishing in 13th for his maiden season.

==== 2017 ====
Zhou stayed for a second F3 season by rejoining Prema and improved to eighth in standings with five podium finishes. Season highlights included leading race 3 in Spa and holding back Lando Norris in the penultimate round.

==== 2018 ====
After speculation of a possible move to F2, Zhou remained with Prema for a third F3 season. After a maiden career win in Pau, a podium in Hungaroring, and three consecutive podium finishes in Zandvoort, Zhou found him standing in second, just a point behind teammate Marcus Armstrong. Despite a strong qualifying pace in Spa and Silverstone, Zhou suffered four consecutive retirements with a series of teammate collisions and tyre punctures. Zhou won his second F3 race in Hockenheim, finishing the season eighth in the standings, with three poles, and two wins.

=== FIA Formula 2 ===
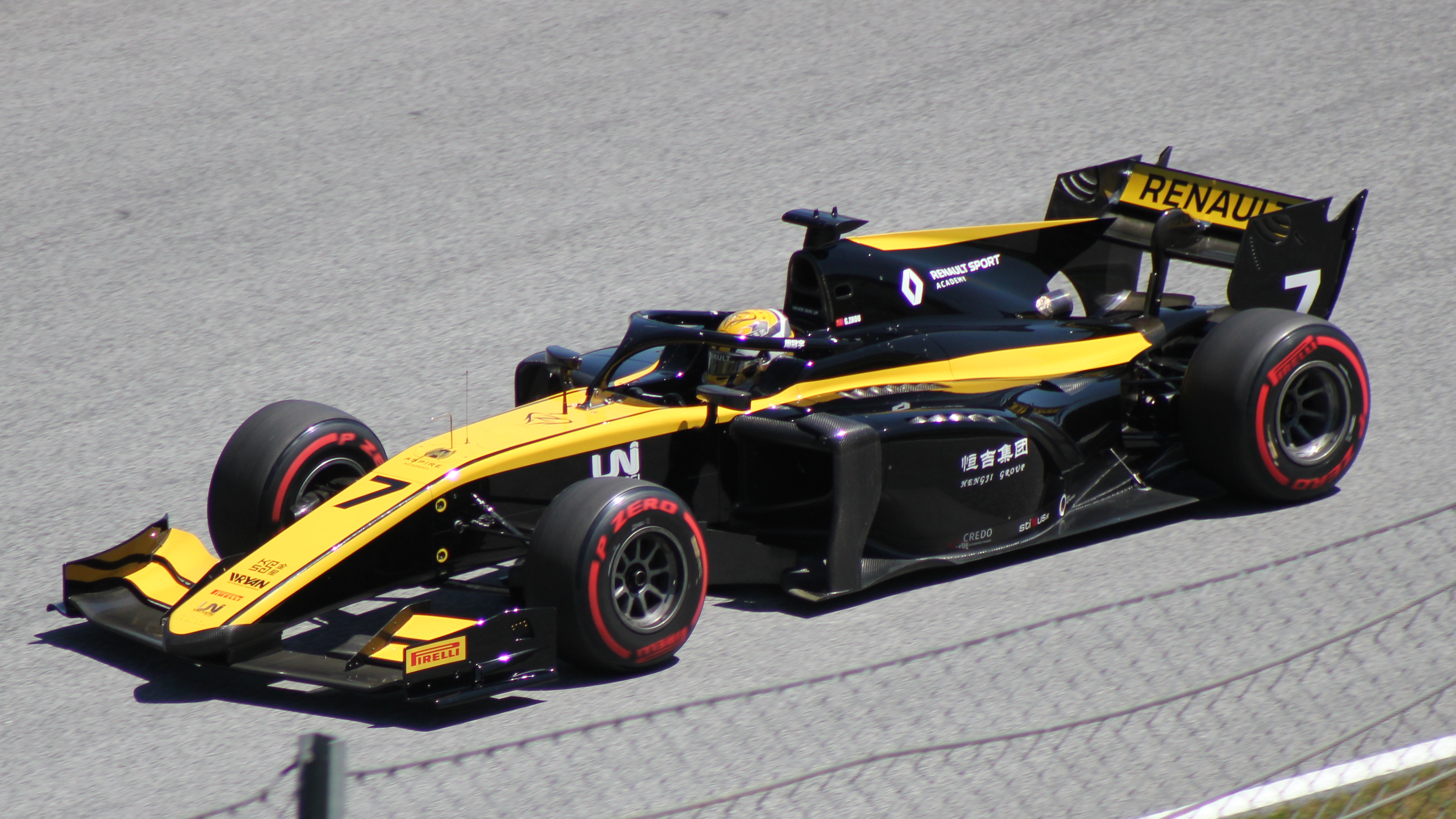
Zhou at the 2019 Spielberg Formula 2 round

==== 2019 ====
In December 2018, Zhou joined UNI-Virtuosi Racing along with Luca Ghiotto for the 2019 FIA Formula 2 Championship. Zhou achieved a maiden feature race podium in Barcelona after a strong qualifying and leading most of the race before dropping to third due to tyre degradation. He subsequently achieved another 3rd in the Monaco sprint race by overtaking Artem Markelov at the start. At Silverstone, Zhou scored his first Formula 2 pole position, becoming the first Chinese driver to do so. Later, Zhou also scored third place in the sprint race at Paul Ricard. In the feature race at Silverstone, he lost positions to his teammate and race winner Luca Ghiotto and the second-place driver Nicholas Latifi. In Abu Dhabi, he also finished third with the fastest lap in Race 1. He finished seventh in the championship and was subsequently awarded the Anthoine Hubert Award for being the highest-finishing rookie.

==== 2020 ====
Zhou remained at UNI-Virtuosi for the 2020 season, partnering Ferrari Driver Academy member Callum Ilott. Zhou took his second Formula 2 pole position at the opening race at the Red Bull Ring. However, his car suffered electronic problems whilst leading the feature race, causing him to drop to 17th. Later in the year, Zhou won his first Formula 2 race in Sochi, after Aitken and Ghiotto crashed at lap 5 of the sprint race, causing a premature end of the race. Over the season, Zhou achieved 6 podiums and finished sixth in the championship.

==== 2021 ====
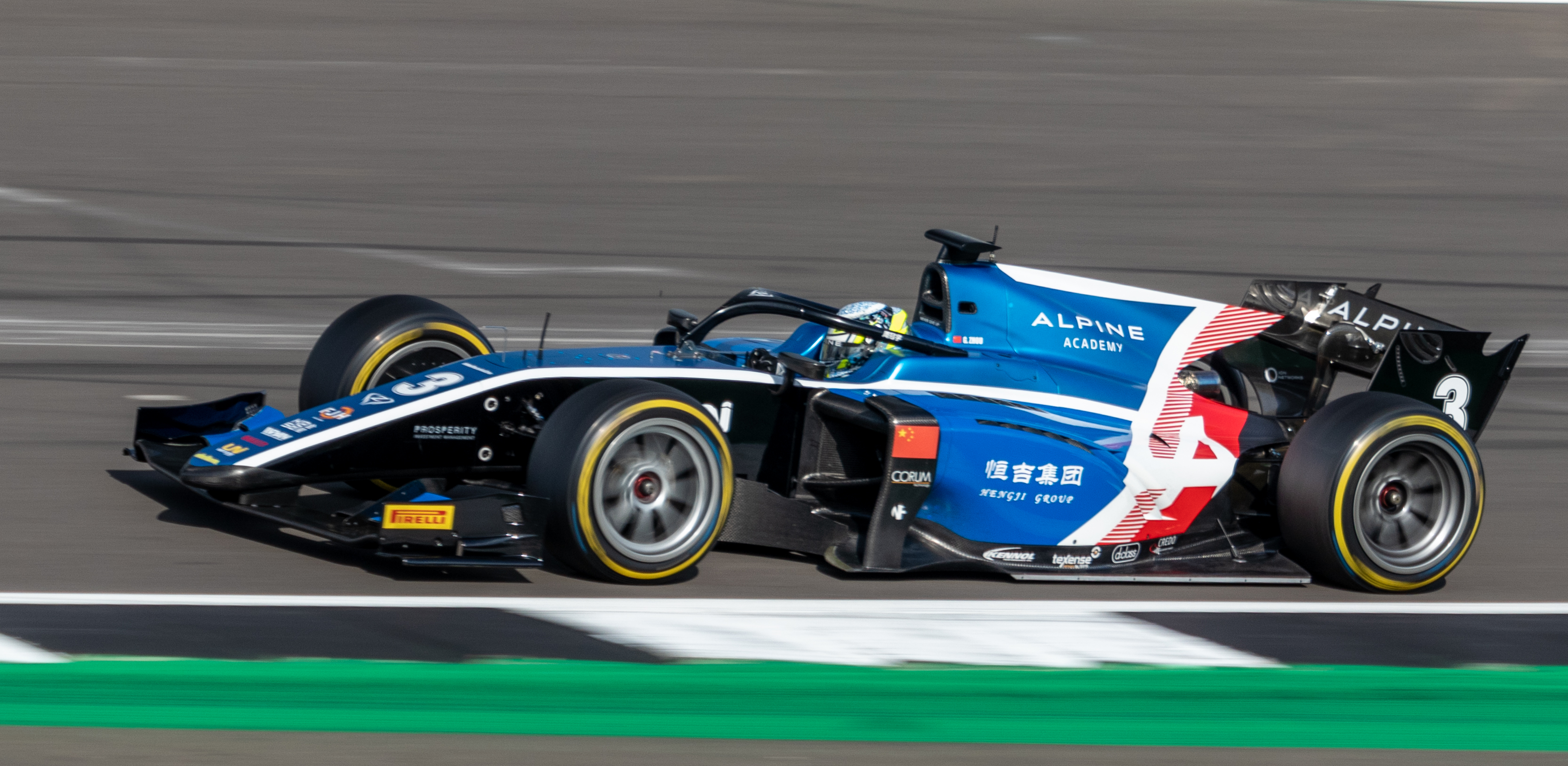
Zhou at the 2021 Silverstone Formula 2 round

Zhou entered his third F2 season staying with UNI-Virtuosi and partnering Felipe Drugovich. He took pole position in the opening round at Bahrain and converted the pole to his first feature race win in F2. Zhou took another victory in the first sprint race in Monaco ahead of his team-mate Drugovich. However, after another podium in Baku, Zhou went four races without scoring points, with a brake failure and a resulting collision with Dan Ticktum in the first lap of the second race in Azerbaijan and a spin in the first sprint race at Silverstone, allowing fellow academy member Oscar Piastri to take the lead in the standings. Zhou broke his duck by taking his third victory of the season in the feature race in Britain, beating out Ticktum for the victory. At the following round in Monza, Zhou was able to end up on the podium twice, losing out to Théo Pourchaire and Piastri in races one and three respectively. Unfortunately for Zhou, he stalled his car following a spin before the first race in Sochi and only managed to finish the feature race in sixth place, thus losing more ground to leader Piastri, who went into the penultimate round with a 36-point advantage. In Round 7 at Jeddah, he dropped to third in the standings after a spin caused by colliding with Christian Lundgaard in the first sprint race. He bounced back in the final round at Abu Dhabi, signing off his F2 career by winning the second sprint race and finishing second in the feature race. He finished the season third in the championship, having achieved four wins, one pole and nine podiums.

=== F3 Asian Championship ===
During the winter break before the start of the 2021 Formula 2 season, Zhou participated in the 2021 F3 Asian Championship driving for Abu Dhabi Racing by Prema. He won the championship after achieving four wins, five poles and 11 podiums in the season.

== Formula One career ==
In 2014, Zhou joined the Ferrari Driver Academy while competing in karting. He left the academy at the end of 2018 and joined the Renault Sport Academy the following year ahead of his move into Formula 2. He served as a development driver for the Renault F1 Team in 2019 and took part in an R.S.17 testing programme, driving at five different circuits during the year. He was promoted to the role of Test Driver in 2020. He participated in the Virtual Grand Prix Series—an esports competition organised by Formula One in place of races postponed or cancelled due to the COVID-19 pandemic—and won the first race held at the Bahrain International Circuit. Once the 2020 season resumed, Zhou took part in three test sessions driving the Renault R.S.18, including the post-season test at Yas Marina Circuit alongside Fernando Alonso. Zhou remained part of the rebranded Alpine Academy for 2021 and made his Formula One race weekend debut for Alpine F1 Team, driving the A521 during the first practice session of the Austrian Grand Prix. This made him the second driver from Mainland China to participate in a Grand Prix weekend session after Ma Qinghua.

=== Alfa Romeo / Sauber (2022–2024) ===
==== 2022: First Chinese Formula One driver ====
Zhou signed a three-year contract with Alfa Romeo for 2022, partnering Valtteri Bottas and becoming China's first Formula One race driver. In a press release following the announcement, Zhou stated that he was "well prepared for the immense challenge of Formula 1" and that his entry into the series would be "a breakthrough for Chinese motorsport history". He chose 24 as his permanent racing number to honour his sporting hero Kobe Bryant, who wore the number during his basketball career with the Los Angeles Lakers. He qualified fifteenth on his debut at the Bahrain Grand Prix, but recovered from a poor start in the race to finish tenth, scoring a point.

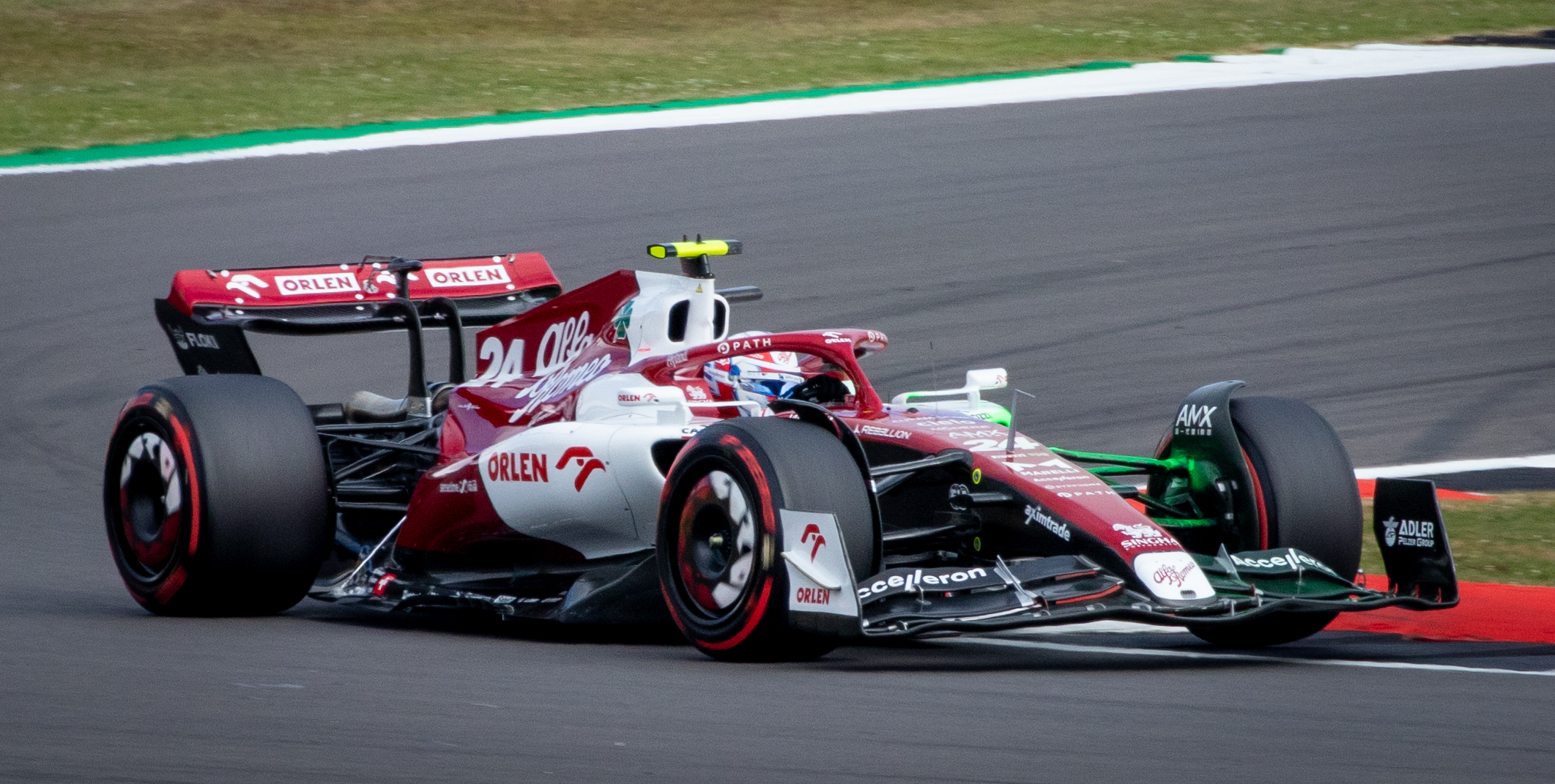
Zhou debuted with Alfa Romeo in 2022, becoming the first Chinese Formula One driver in the sport's history.

Seven races without points followed. A collision with Pierre Gasly eliminated him from the Emilia Romagna Grand Prix sprint, which was followed by mechanical retirements at the Miami and Spanish Grands Prix. A hydraulics issue at the Azerbaijan Grand Prix caused his third retirement in four races. At the Canadian Grand Prix, Zhou reached the third qualifying session (Q3) for the first time and finished the race eighth, scoring points for the second time. At the next race, the British Grand Prix, he was involved in a high-speed collision with George Russell on the opening lap that caused Zhou's car to flip upside-down, skid across the track and gravel and bounce over the barriers into the catch fence. He was extracted and taken to the medical centre, and then declared fit after being observed. Zhou later commented that the halo saved his life during the crash.

More mechanical problems followed; he was required to start the Austrian Grand Prix sprint from the pit lane after an engine issue on the formation lap, and another power unit issue caused his retirement from the French Grand Prix. He scored another point by finishing tenth at the Italian Grand Prix, which ended behind the safety car. A collision with Nicholas Latifi ended his race at the Singapore Grand Prix. He finished sixteenth at the rain-shortened Japanese Grand Prix, but a late pit stop for new tyres allowed him to claim the fastest lap for the first time in his career. Zhou ended the season eighteenth in the World Drivers' Championship with six points to teammate Bottas's 49.

==== 2023: Continued struggles with machinery ====
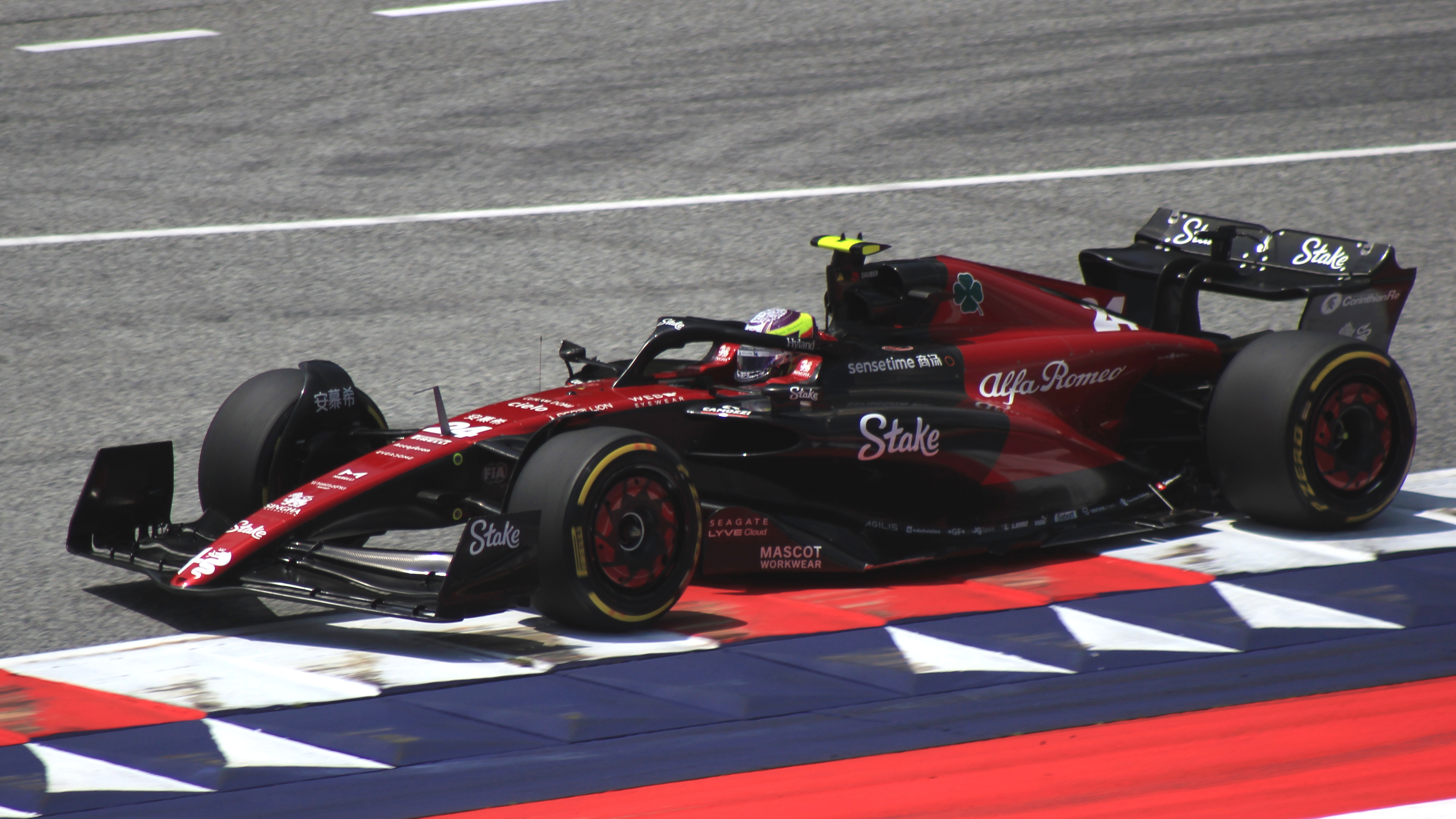
Zhou at the 2023 Austrian Grand Prix

Zhou remained with Alfa Romeo for 2023 alongside Bottas. During the second day of pre-season testing at the Bahrain International Circuit, he set the fastest lap time of 1:31.610. He qualified thirteenth at the season-opening Bahrain Grand Prix and finished sixteenth, having made a pit stop for soft tyres on the penultimate lap to claim the fastest lap of the race. Alfa Romeo later explained that this was done to deny rivals Alpine and ninth-placed Pierre Gasly the bonus point. Zhou claimed his first points-scoring finish of the season at the Australian Grand Prix with ninth place, having started seventeenth. This was followed by a mechanical retirement at the Azerbaijan Grand Prix. He scored points again at the Spanish Grand Prix, starting thirteenth and finishing ninth. He achieved his best Formula One qualifying performance at the Hungarian Grand Prix, setting the fastest Q1 time and then qualifying fifth. He was slow off the start line and was then involved in a first-corner collision for which he received a time penalty; he went on to finish the race sixteenth.

Zhou started fifteenth on the grid at the Dutch Grand Prix but a call to change to intermediate tyres after lap one promoted him as high as second place. He eventually dropped outside the top ten and later crashed out of the race when the rain returned. Zhou qualified nineteenth at the Singapore Grand Prix and was required to start from the pit lane as his car was modified in parc fermé. Despite "unfortunate" safety car timing, he recovered to twelfth after "an epic stint on the medium tyres". Zhou qualified last on the grid at the Qatar Grand Prix, but benefitted from Carlos Sainz Jr.'s failure to start, a collision between Lewis Hamilton and George Russell and other drivers' struggles with the extreme heat to take ninth place in the main race, his third points finish of the season. He reached Q3 in qualifying at the Mexico City Grand Prix, but was unable to hold off the cars behind and was classified fourteenth at the finish. He qualified in last place at the São Paulo Grand Prix and retired from the race with engine issues.

Zhou finished eighteenth in the World Drivers' Championship with six points, an identical result to 2022. Teammate Bottas scored ten points and qualified ahead of Zhou at fifteen of the twenty-two races. Autosport praised Zhou for "holding his own" against Bottas but identified qualifying as an area for improvement, and RaceFans described his performance in 2023 as "professional if unspectacular".

==== 2024: Only points scored for Sauber ====
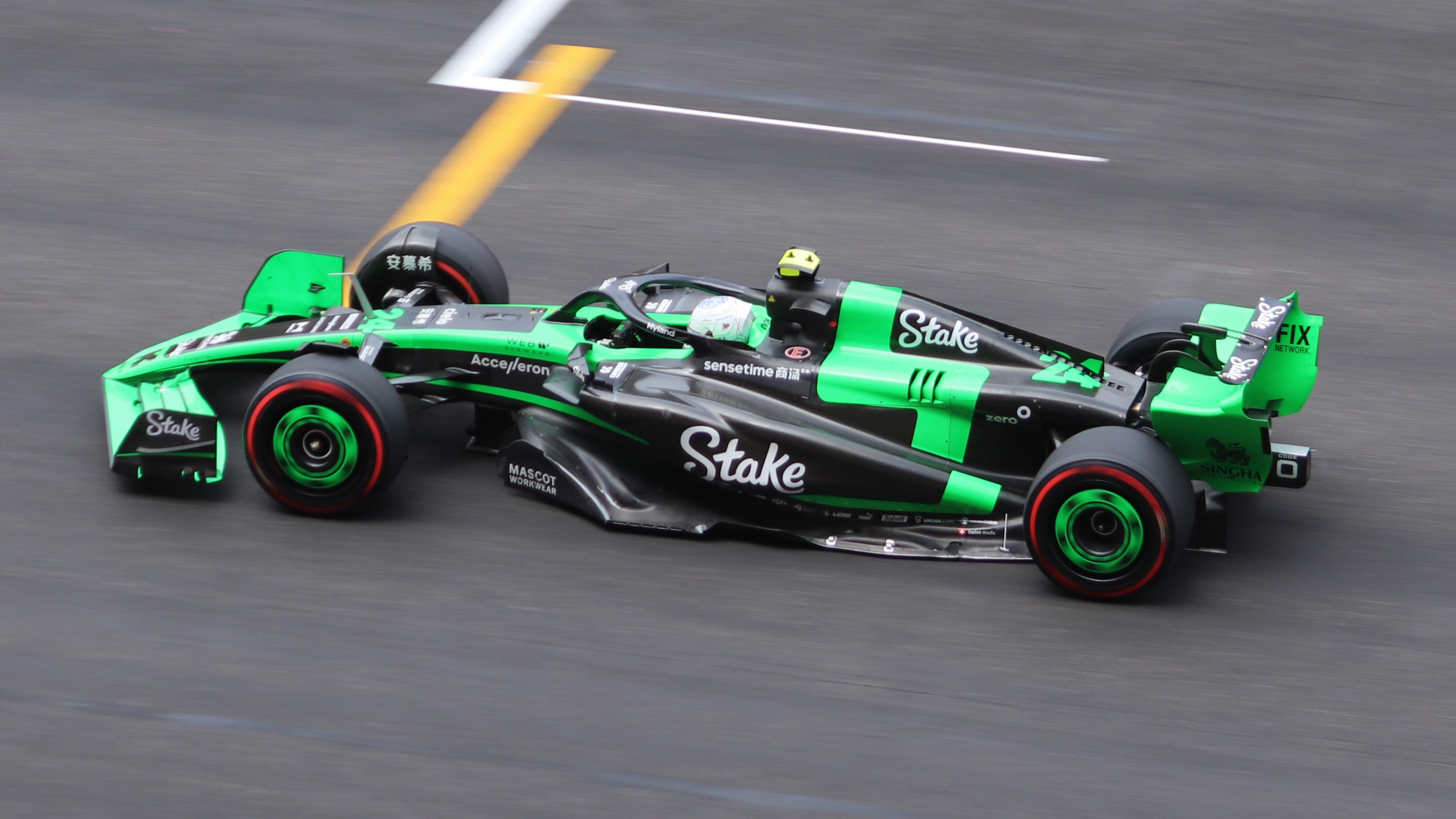
Zhou scored 4 points at the Qatar Grand Prix during 2024, the only points that his team scored that season.

Zhou and Bottas were retained at the team for the 2024 season. Following the end of Sauber's partnership with Alfa Romeo, the team rebranded to Stake F1 Team Kick Sauber to accommodate the sponsorship of Stake.com and Kick. Zhou completed the race in his home city of Shanghai for the first time in April as the Chinese Grand Prix returned to the calendar for the 2024 season.

Zhou improved from seventeenth on the grid to eleventh at the finish at the opening race, the Bahrain Grand Prix. He crashed in the final practice session at the Saudi Arabian Grand Prix and the team were unable to repair his car in time to set a qualifying lap; he finished the race last of the running drivers in eighteenth place. He damaged his front wing in qualifying at the Australian Grand Prix and was forced to start the race from the pit lane due to a different specification replacement part being fitted; the team had not brought spares of the current design to Australia. He finished the race fifteenth. This was followed by a gearbox-related retirement at the Japanese Grand Prix after qualifying in last place.

Zhou Guanyu, interviewed in 2024

At the 2024 Chinese Grand Prix, he finished his first home race in 14th place. After the race, he was given a special parking spot on the grid to celebrate the completion of his first ever home race in front of the Chinese crowd. Zhou finished 16th in the 2024 Monaco Grand Prix after a three-car collision between Nico Hülkenberg, Sergio Pérez and Kevin Magnussen. Zhou avoided the accident but managed to continue. Zhou out-qualified Valtteri Bottas for the British Grand Prix. He was last of the finishers after home hero George Russell and Alpine's Pierre Gasly retired. Zhou finished ahead of Bottas in the Azerbaijan Grand Prix while Bottas finished 16th after the race was neutralised on lap 50 which occurred a high-speed collision between Carlos Sainz Jr. and Sergio Pérez. He scored Sauber's only points of the 2024 season at the Qatar Grand Prix, qualifying twelfth and finishing eighth after two safety cars, and was voted Driver of the Day.

Zhou left Sauber at the end of the season, with Nico Hülkenberg and Gabriel Bortoleto joining for 2025, prior to their takeover by Audi.

=== Ferrari reserve driver (2025) ===
Zhou joined Ferrari as a reserve driver for the 2025 season. At the start of 2026, it was announced that he would not continue in his role with the team for the 2026 season.

=== Cadillac reserve driver (2026) ===
In January 2026, it was announced that Zhou would join Cadillac as a reserve driver for the team's maiden season.

== Karting record ==
=== Karting career summary ===
Season	Series	Team	Position
2010	Kartmasters British Grand Prix — Rotax Mini Max		14th
2011	Trent Valley Kart Club — Mini Max		10th
2012	Kartmasters British Grand Prix — Rotax Junior	Strawberry Racing	6th
2012	Super 1 National Championship — Rotax Mini Max		4th
2012	Rotax Max Euro Challenge — Junior	Strawberry Racing	8th
2012	Rotax International Open — Junior		6th
2012	Rotax Max Challenge Grand Finals — Junior	RPM Racing Team	8th
2013	Rotax Max Wintercup — Rotax Max Junior	Strawberry Racing	2nd
2013	Super 1 National Championship — Rotax Max Junior	Strawberry Racing	1st
2013	Rotax Max Euro Challenge — Junior	Strawberry Racing	1st
2013	Rotax International Open — Junior	Strawberry Racing	3rd
2013	Rotax Max Challenge Grand Finals — Junior	Strawberry Racing	3rd
2014	Rotax Max Wintercup — Rotax Max Senior	Strawberry Racing	2nd
2014	South Garda Winter Cup — KF	Strawberry Racing	12th
2014	WSK Champions Cup — KF	Strawberry Racing	32nd
2014	WSK Super Master Series — KF	Strawberry Racing	27th
2014	CIK-FIA European Championship — KF	Ricky Flynn Motorsport	44th
2014	Rotax Max Euro Challenge — Senior	Strawberry Racing	2nd
2014	CIK-FIA World Championship — KF	Ricky Flynn Motorsport	NC
2014	Rotax Max Challenge Grand Finals — Senior	Strawberry Racing	16th

== Racing record ==
=== Racing career summary ===
Season	Series	Team	Races	Wins	Poles	F/Laps	Podiums	Points	Position
2014	Italian F4 Winter Trophy	Prema Powerteam	2	0	0	0	2	N/A	N/A
2015	Italian F4 Championship	Prema Powerteam	21	3	2	0	9	223	**2nd**
2015	ADAC Formula 4 Championship	Prema Powerteam	9	0	0	0	2	45	15th
2016	FIA Formula 3 European Championship	Motopark	30	0	0	0	2	101	13th
2016	Masters of Formula 3	Motopark	1	0	0	1	0	N/A	16th
2016	Macau Grand Prix	Motopark	1	0	0	0	0	N/A	15th
2016	Toyota Racing Series	M2 Competition	15	1	0	1	4	685	6th
2017	FIA Formula 3 European Championship	Prema Powerteam	30	0	0	0	5	149	8th
2017	Macau Grand Prix	Theodore Racing by Prema	1	0	0	0	0	N/A	8th
2017–18	Formula E	Techeetah	Development driver						
2018	FIA Formula 3 European Championship	Prema Theodore Racing	30	2	3	1	6	203	8th
2018	Macau Grand Prix	SJM Theodore Racing by Prema	1	0	0	0	0	N/A	11th
2019	FIA Formula 2 Championship	UNI-Virtuosi Racing	22	0	1	2	5	140	7th
2020	FIA Formula 2 Championship	UNI-Virtuosi Racing	24	1	1	4	6	151.5	6th
2020	Formula One	Renault DP World F1 Team	Test driver						
2021	FIA Formula 2 Championship	UNI-Virtuosi Racing	22	4	1	1	9	183	**3rd**
2021	F3 Asian Championship	Abu Dhabi Racing by Prema	15	4	5	5	11	257	**1st**
2021	Formula One	Alpine F1 Team	Test driver						
2022	Formula One	Alfa Romeo F1 Team Orlen	22	0	0	1	0	6	18th
2023	Formula One	Alfa Romeo F1 Team Stake	22	0	0	1	0	6	18th
2024	Formula One	Stake F1 Team Kick Sauber	24	0	0	0	0	4	20th
2025	Formula One	Scuderia Ferrari HP	Reserve driver						
2026	Formula One	Cadillac F1 Team	Reserve driver						

=== Complete Italian F4 Championship results ===
(key) (Races in bold indicate pole position) (Races in italics indicate fastest lap)

Year	Team	1	2	3	4	5	6	7	8	9	10	11	12	13	14	15	16	17	18	19	20	21	DC	Points
2015	Prema Powerteam	VLL; 1; 4	VLL; 2; 8	**VLL**; **3**; 2	MNZ; 1; 1	MNZ; 2; 1	**MNZ**; **3**; 1	IMO1; 1; 2	IMO1; 2 Ret	IMO1; 3; 2	MUG; 1; 6	MUG; 2; 5	MUG; 3; 6	ADR; 1; 2	ADR; 2; 15	ADR; 3; 3	IMO2; 1; 3	IMO2; 2; 5	IMO2; 3; 5	MIS; 1; 8	MIS; 2; 20	MIS; 3; 13	2nd	223

=== Complete ADAC Formula 4 Championship results ===
(key) (Races in bold indicate pole position) (Races in italics indicate fastest lap)

Year	Team	1	2	3	4	5	6	7	8	9	10	11	12	13	14	15	16	17	18	19	20	21	22	23	24	DC	Points
2015	Prema Powerteam	OSC1; 1; 28	OSC1; 2; 9	OSC1; 3; 18	RBR; 1; 3	RBR; 2; 7	RBR; 3 Ret	SPA; 1; 2	SPA; 2 Ret	SPA; 3; 9	LAU; 1	LAU; 2	LAU; 3	NÜR; 1	NÜR; 2	NÜR; 3	SAC; 1	SAC; 2	SAC; 3	OSC2; 1	OSC2; 2	OSC2; 3	HOC; 1	HOC; 2	HOC; 3	15th	45

=== Complete Toyota Racing Series results ===
(key) (Races in bold indicate pole position) (Races in italics indicate fastest lap)

Year	Team	1	2	3	4	5	6	7	8	9	10	11	12	13	14	15	DC	Points
2016	M2 Competition	RUA; 1; 5	RUA; 2; 3	RUA; 3; 4	TER; 1; 7	TER; 2; 6	TER; 3; 8	HMP; 1; 7	HMP; 2; 1	HMP; 3; 4	TAU; 1; 4	TAU; 2; 3	TAU; 3; 3	MAU; 1 Ret	MAU; 2; 10	MAU; 3; 17	6th	685

=== Complete FIA Formula 3 European Championship results ===
(key) (Races in bold indicate pole position) (Races in italics indicate fastest lap)

Year	Entrant	Engine	1	2	3	4	5	6	7	8	9	10	11	12	13	14	15	16	17	18	19	20	21	22	23	24	25	26	27	28	29	30	DC	Points
2016	Motopark	Volkswagen	LEC; 1; 14	LEC; 2; 3	LEC; 3; 8	HUN; 1; 8	HUN; 2; 3	HUN; 3; 4	PAU; 1; 11	PAU; 2 Ret	PAU; 3 Ret	RBR; 1; 14	RBR; 2; 11	RBR; 3; 7	NOR; 1 Ret	NOR; 2; 6	NOR; 3; 4	ZAN; 1; 16	ZAN; 2; 18	ZAN; 3; 16	SPA; 1; 17	SPA; 2; 8	SPA; 3; 11	NÜR; 1; 12	NÜR; 2; 12	NÜR; 3; 12	IMO; 1; 6	IMO; 2; 5	IMO; 3; 10	HOC; 1; 11	HOC; 2; 13	HOC; 3; 11	13th	101
2017	Prema Powerteam	Mercedes	SIL; 1; 7	SIL; 2; 7	SIL; 3 Ret	MNZ; 1; 5	MNZ; 2; 6	MNZ; 3; 10	PAU; 1 Ret	PAU; 2 Ret	PAU; 3; 10	HUN; 1; 7	HUN; 2; 3	HUN; 3; 4	NOR; 1; 3	NOR; 2; 8	NOR; 3; 12	SPA; 1; 12	SPA; 2; 17	SPA; 3; 3	ZAN; 1; 16	ZAN; 2; 8	ZAN; 3; 4	NÜR; 1; 9	NÜR; 2; 14	NÜR; 3 Ret	RBR; 1; 9	RBR; 2; 19	RBR; 3; 14	HOC; 1; 13	HOC; 2; 3	HOC; 3; 3	8th	149
2018	Prema Theodore Racing	Mercedes	PAU; 1; 1	PAU; 2; 12	PAU; 3; 13	HUN; 1; 2	HUN; 2; 4	HUN; 3; 5	NOR; 1; 9	NOR; 2; 12	NOR; 3; 4	**ZAN**; **1**; 2	ZAN; 2; 3	ZAN; 3; 2	SPA; 1 Ret	SPA; 2 Ret	**SPA**; **3**; 13	SIL; 1 Ret	SIL; 2; 6	SIL; 3; 8	MIS; 1; 4	MIS; 2; 11	MIS; 3 Ret	NÜR; 1; 7	NÜR; 2; 8	NÜR; 3; 8	RBR; 1; 12	RBR; 2; 9	RBR; 3; 11	**HOC**; **1**; 1	HOC; 2; 10	HOC; 3; 5	8th	203

=== Complete Macau Grand Prix results ===
Year	Team	Car	Qualifying	Quali Race	Main race
2016	(Germany) Motopark	Dallara F312	20th	DNF	15th
2017	(Italy) Prema Powerteam	Dallara F317	10th	10th	8th
2018	(Italy) SJM Theodore Racing by Prema	Dallara F317	5th	24th	11th

=== Complete FIA Formula 2 Championship results ===
(key) (Races in bold indicate pole position points) (Races in italics indicate fastest lap points)

Year	Entrant	1	2	3	4	5	6	7	8	9	10	11	12	13	14	15	16	17	18	19	20	21	22	23	24	DC	Points
2019	UNI-Virtuosi Racing	BHR; FEA; 10	BHR; SPR; 4	BAK; FEA; Ret	BAK; SPR; 10	CAT; FEA; 3	CAT; SPR; 4	MON; FEA; 5	MON; SPR; 3	LEC; FEA; 4	LEC; SPR; 3	RBR; FEA; 6	RBR; SPR; 8	**SIL**; **FEA**; 3	SIL; SPR; 8	HUN; FEA; 9	HUN; SPR; 9	SPA; FEA; C	SPA; SPR; C	MNZ; FEA; Ret	MNZ; SPR; 4	SOC; FEA; 10	SOC; SPR; 5	YMC; FEA; 3	YMC; SPR; 8	7th	140
2020	UNI-Virtuosi Racing	**RBR1**; **FEA**; 17	RBR1; SPR; 14	RBR2; FEA; 3	RBR2; SPR; 4	HUN; FEA; 10	HUN; SPR; 8	SIL1; FEA; 2	SIL1; SPR; 9	SIL2; FEA; 9	SIL2; SPR; 7	CAT; FEA; 3	CAT; SPR; 14	SPA; FEA; 7	SPA; SPR; 3	MNZ; FEA; 5	MNZ; SPR; NC	MUG; FEA; Ret	MUG; SPR; 5	SOC; FEA; 8	SOC; SPR; 1‡	BHR1; FEA; 14	BHR1; SPR; 5	BHR2; FEA; 2	BHR2; SPR; 4	6th	151.5
2021	UNI-Virtuosi Racing	BHR; SP1; 7	BHR; SP2; 3	**BHR**; **FEA**; 1	MCO; SP1; 1	MCO; SP2; 15	MCO; FEA; 5	BAK; SP1; 3	BAK; SP2; Ret	BAK; FEA; 13	SIL; SP1; Ret	SIL; SP2; 11	SIL; FEA; 1	MNZ; SP1; 2	MNZ; SP2; 8	MNZ; FEA; 2	SOC; SP1; DNS	SOC; SP2; C	SOC; FEA; 6	JED; SP1; 17	JED; SP2; 8	JED; FEA; 4‡	YMC; SP1; 8	YMC; SP2; 1	YMC; FEA; 2	3rd	183

^{‡} Half points awarded as less than 75% of race distance was completed.

=== Complete F3 Asian Championship results ===
(key) (Races in bold indicate pole position) (Races in italics indicate fastest lap)

Year	Entrant	1	2	3	4	5	6	7	8	9	10	11	12	13	14	15	DC	Points
2021	Abu Dhabi Racing by Prema	**DUB**; **1**; 1	DUB; 2; 1	DUB; 3 Ret	ABU; 1; 2	ABU; 2; 4	ABU; 3; 5	ABU; 1; 3	ABU; 2; 2	ABU; 3; 2	**DUB**; **1**; 2	DUB; 2; 2	**DUB**; **3**; 4	**ABU**; **1**; 1	ABU; 2; 2	**ABU**; **3**; 1	1st	257

=== Complete Formula One results ===
(key) (Races in bold indicate pole position) (Races in italics indicate fastest lap)

Year	Entrant	Chassis	Engine	1	2	3	4	5	6	7	8	9	10	11	12	13	14	15	16	17	18	19	20	21	22	23	24	WDC	Points
2021	Alpine F1 Team	Alpine A521	Renault E-Tech 20B 1.6 V6 t	BHR	EMI	POR	ESP	MON	AZE	FRA	STY	AUT; TD	GBR	HUN	BEL	NED	ITA	RUS	TUR	USA	MXC	SAP	QAT	SAU	ABU			–	–
2022	Alfa Romeo F1 Team Orlen	Alfa Romeo C42	Ferrari 066/7 1.6 V6 t	BHR; 10	SAU; 11	AUS; 11	EMI; 15	MIA; Ret	ESP; Ret	MON; 16	AZE; Ret	CAN; 8	GBR; Ret	AUT; 14	FRA; 16†	HUN; 13	BEL; 14	NED; 16	ITA; 10	SIN; Ret	JPN; 16	USA; 12	MXC; 13	SAP; 12	ABU; 12			18th	6
2023	Alfa Romeo F1 Team Stake	Alfa Romeo C43	Ferrari 066/10 1.6 V6 t	BHR; 16	SAU; 13	AUS; 9	AZE; Ret	MIA; 16	MON; 13	ESP; 9	CAN; 16	AUT; 12	GBR; 15	HUN; 16	BEL; 13	NED; Ret	ITA; 14	SIN; 12	JPN; 13	QAT; 9	USA; 13	MXC; 14	SAP; Ret	LVG; 15	ABU; 17			18th	6
2024	Stake F1 Team Kick Sauber	Kick Sauber C44	Ferrari 066/12 1.6 V6 t	BHR; 11	SAU; 18	AUS; 15	JPN; Ret	CHN; 14	MIA; 14	EMI; 15	MON; 16	CAN; 15	ESP; 13	AUT; 17	GBR; 18	HUN; 19	BEL; Ret	NED; 20	ITA; 18	AZE; 14	SIN; 15	USA; 19	MXC; 15	SAP; 15	LVG; 13	QAT; 8	ABU; 13	20th	4

^{†} Did not finish, but was classified as he had completed more than 90% of the race distance.

== Notes ==
Sporting positions
Preceded by Joey Alders	F3 Asian Championship; Champion; 2021	Succeeded by Arthur Leclerc
Awards
Preceded by Inaugural	Anthoine Hubert Award; 2019	Succeeded by Yuki Tsunoda
Preceded by Oscar Piastri	Autosport Awards; Rookie of the Year; 2022	Succeeded by Oscar Piastri
