= Westbourne School =

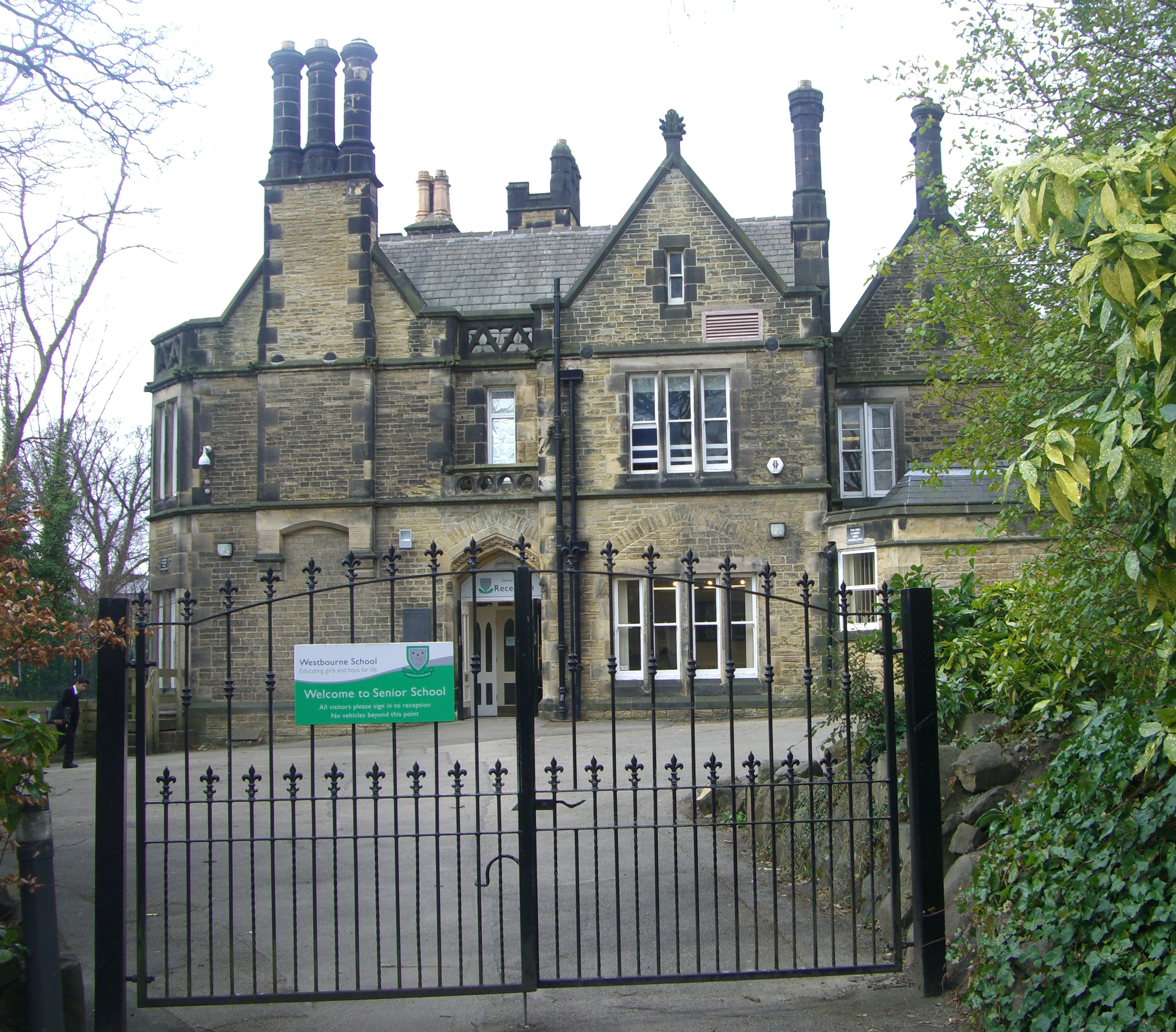
- Senior School building

Location
- 60 Westbourne Road; Broomhill; Sheffield, South Yorkshire, S10 2QT; England; 53.37452°N 1.50255°W

Information
- Head teacher: Aidan Edmanson
- Age: 3 to 16
- Website: http://www.westbourneschool.co.uk/

Westbourne School for Boys and girls is a private school for boys and girls aged 3–16 years old. It is located in the Broomhill area of south Sheffield, South Yorkshire, England. The headmaster is Aidan Edmanson.

The school was founded in 1885. It has two campuses — a Junior and a Senior school situated yards apart. In 2022, construction on an extension was completed.

In 2023, the GCSE results achieved 41% 9-7.

== Notable former pupils ==
- Zhou Guanyu (born 1999), racing driver
