= 2024 United States Grand Prix =

Nineteenth round of the 2024 F1 season

Race 19 of 24 in the 2024 Formula One World Championship
← Previous race	Next race →
- Layout of the Circuit of the Americas

Race details
- Date: October 20, 2024
- Official name: Formula 1 Pirelli United States Grand Prix 2024
- Location: Circuit of the Americas; Austin, Texas, United States
- Course: Permanent racing facility
- Course length: 5.513 km (3.426 miles)
- Distance: 56 laps, 308.405 km (191.634 miles)
- Weather: Sunny
- Attendance: 430,000

Pole position
Driver	(United Kingdom) Lando Norris	McLaren-Mercedes
- Time: 1:32.330

Fastest lap
Driver	(France) Esteban Ocon	Alpine-Renault
- Time: 1:37.330 on lap 53

Podium
First	(Monaco) Charles Leclerc	Ferrari
Second	(Spain) Carlos Sainz Jr.	Ferrari
Third	(Netherlands) Max Verstappen	Red Bull Racing-Honda RBPT

The 2024 United States Grand Prix (officially known as the Formula 1 Pirelli United States Grand Prix 2024) was a Formula One motor race held on October 20, 2024, at the Circuit of the Americas in Austin, Texas, United States. It was the nineteenth round of the 2024 Formula One World Championship and the fourth Grand Prix weekend of the season to utilise the sprint format.

Max Verstappen of Red Bull Racing took pole position for the sprint event, which he proceeded to win ahead of Carlos Sainz Jr. of Ferrari and Lando Norris of McLaren. Norris took pole position for the main race, but lost out to Charles Leclerc of Ferrari ahead of his teammate Sainz, marking a Ferrari 1–2 finish, their first in the United States since 2006, Ferrari's first win in the United States since 2018 with Kimi Räikkönen, and Leclerc's most recent win until the 2026 British Grand Prix.

After an intense late-race battle between him and Verstappen, Norris finished third on track, but was demoted to fourth after a late penalty. Verstappen finished third. Esteban Ocon of Alpine achieved his first career fastest lap in this race, but did not receive the point as he was positioned in eighteenth. Verstappen remained in the lead of the Drivers' Championship, extending his advantage to 57 points over Norris, who remained in second with 297 points, while Leclerc was a further 22 points behind. McLaren maintained their lead in the Constructors' Championship as well by 40 points over Red Bull, with Ferrari only a further eight points behind Red Bull in third following their first 1–2 finish since the Australian Grand Prix earlier in the season.

== Background ==
The event was held at the Circuit of the Americas in Austin, Texas, for the twelfth time in the circuit's history, across the weekend of October 18–20. The Grand Prix was the nineteenth round of the 2024 Formula One World Championship and the 45th running of the United States Grand Prix as a round of the Formula One World Championship.

=== Championship standings before the race ===
Going into the weekend, Max Verstappen led the Drivers' Championship with 331 points, 52 points ahead of Lando Norris in second, and 86 ahead of Charles Leclerc in third. McLaren, holding 516 points, entered this round as the leader of the Constructors' Championship ahead of Red Bull Racing and Ferrari, who were second and third with 475 and 441 points, respectively.

=== Entrants ===
The drivers and teams were the same as the season entry list with two exceptions: Franco Colapinto, who replaced Logan Sargeant at Williams from the Italian Grand Prix onwards; Liam Lawson replaced Daniel Ricciardo at RB, as Riccardo was dropped from the team following the Singapore Grand Prix.

=== Tyre choices ===
Sole tyre supplier Pirelli brought the C2, C3, and C4 tyre compounds (the middle three in their range), designated hard, medium, and soft, respectively, for teams to use at the event.

=== Special liveries and car upgrades ===
During the race weekend, three teams equipped their cars with special liveries. The McLaren MCL38 featured a chrome livery, which was also used a year prior at the 2023 British Grand Prix. The livery is a reference to Google Chrome, one of the McLaren's main sponsors. The Haas VF-24 used a livery inspired by the American flag, including stars, stripes, and an eagle. The Alpine A524 switched to an orange livery to promote the Xbox video game Indiana Jones and the Great Circle.

Eight out of the ten teams brought upgrade packages for their cars for the race. The Red Bull Racing RB20 had an adjusted floor, in addition to modifications to the portion of the upper sidepod where it meets with the engine cover. The Mercedes W15 had substantial upgrades, with changes to the front wing, front suspension, floor, and bodywork. Similarly, the McLaren MCL38 had several upgrades, specifically to improve the car's aerodynamics. This included modifications to the front wing, suspension, brake ducts, and beam wing. Likewise, the Aston Martin AMR24 had significant adjustments; this includes the front wing, floor, engine cover, and rear diffuser. The Alpine A524 had adjustments to its floor, rear wing, and bodywork. The Haas VF-24 also brought several changes to improve aerodynamics, including a modified floor and modified sidepods. The Kick Sauber C44 had a brand new front wing and suspension modifications, while the RB VCARB 01 had a new floor. The Ferrari SF-24 and Williams FW46 did not receive any upgrades.

== Free practice ==
The only free practice session was held on October 18, 2024, at 12:30 local time (UTC–5). It lasted for one hour, and was topped by Carlos Sainz Jr. of Ferrari with a time of 1.33.602. He was ahead of his teammate Charles Leclerc, who placed second, and Max Verstappen of Red Bull Racing, who placed third.

== Sprint qualifying ==
Sprint qualifying was held on October 18 at 16:30 local time (UTC–5), and determined the starting grid order for the sprint race. It consisted of three sessions, with the five drivers with the lowest lap times being eliminated following each of the first two sessions. During the 12 minute long first session (SQ1), both Saubers consisting of Zhou Guanyu Valtteri Bottas were eliminated, in addition to Alex Albon of Williams, Esteban Ocon of Alpine, and Oscar Piastri of McLaren. Session 2 (SQ2) lasted for ten minutes, with Sergio Pérez and Pierre Gasly being eliminated in 11th and 12th, respectively. Lance Stroll, Fernando Alonso, and Liam Lawson were all eliminated because they did not set a legal lap time during the session. The third session (SQ3) lasted for eight minutes, and determined the final order of the remaining ten drivers. Max Verstappen of Red Bull Racing finished the session in first, with a lap time of 1:32.833. George Russell finished in second, with a gap of 0.012 seconds behind Verstappen. The Ferraris of Charles Leclerc and Carlos Sainz Jr. finished in third and fifth, respectively; Lando Norris finished in fourth between them. Nico Hülkenberg, Lewis Hamilton, Kevin Magnussen, Yuki Tsunoda, and Franco Colapinto completing the top ten.

=== Sprint qualifying classification ===
Pos.	No.	Driver	Constructor	Qualifying times			Sprint grid
Pos.	No.	Driver	Constructor	SQ1	SQ2	SQ3	Sprint grid
1	1	(Netherlands) Max Verstappen	Red Bull Racing-Honda RBPT	1:33.908	1:33.290	1:32.833	1
2	63	(United Kingdom) George Russell	Mercedes	1:34.125	1:33.544	1:32.845	2
3	16	(Monaco) Charles Leclerc	Ferrari	1:33.647	1:33.392	1:33.059	3
4	4	(United Kingdom) Lando Norris	McLaren-Mercedes	1:33.919	1:33.566	1:33.083	4
5	55	(Spain) Carlos Sainz Jr.	Ferrari	1:34.109	1:33.274	1:33.089	5
6	27	(Germany) Nico Hülkenberg	Haas-Ferrari	1:34.825	1:33.994	1:33.183	6
7	44	(United Kingdom) Lewis Hamilton	Mercedes	1:33.840	1:33.370	1:33.378	7
8	20	(Denmark) Kevin Magnussen	Haas-Ferrari	1:34.403	1:33.788	1:33.398	8
9	22	(Japan) Yuki Tsunoda	RB-Honda RBPT	1:34.646	1:34.052	1:33.802	9
10	43	(Argentina) Franco Colapinto	Williams-Mercedes	1:34.606	1:33.952	1:34.406	10
11	11	(Mexico) Sergio Pérez	Red Bull Racing-Honda RBPT	1:34.333	1:34.244	N/A	11
12	10	(France) Pierre Gasly	Alpine-Renault	1:34.865	1:34.363	N/A	12
13	18	(Canada) Lance Stroll	Aston Martin Aramco-Mercedes	1:34.324	No time	N/A	13
14	14	(Spain) Fernando Alonso	Aston Martin Aramco-Mercedes	1:34.436	No time	N/A	14
15	30	(New Zealand) Liam Lawson	RB-Honda RBPT	1:34.617	No time	N/A	15
16	81	(Australia) Oscar Piastri	McLaren-Mercedes	1:34.881	N/A	N/A	16
17	31	(France) Esteban Ocon	Alpine-Renault	1:34.917	N/A	N/A	17
18	23	(Thailand) Alexander Albon	Williams-Mercedes	1:35.054	N/A	N/A	PL^{a}
19	77	(Finland) Valtteri Bottas	Kick Sauber-Ferrari	1:35.148	N/A	N/A	18
20	24	(China) Zhou Guanyu	Kick Sauber-Ferrari	1:36.472	N/A	N/A	19
107% time: 1:40.202

Notes

- ^a – Alexander Albon qualified 18th, but was required to start the sprint from the pit lane as his car was modified under parc fermé conditions.

== Sprint ==
The sprint was held on October 19, 2024, at 13:00 local time (UTC–5), and ran for 19 laps.

=== Sprint classification ===
Pos.	No.	Driver	Constructor	Laps	Time/Retired	Grid	Points
1	1	(Netherlands) Max Verstappen	Red Bull Racing-Honda RBPT	19	31:06.146	1	8
2	55	(Spain) Carlos Sainz Jr.	Ferrari	19	+3.882	5	7
3	4	(United Kingdom) Lando Norris	McLaren-Mercedes	19	+6.240	4	6
4	16	(Monaco) Charles Leclerc	Ferrari	19	+6.956	3	5
5	63	(United Kingdom) George Russell	Mercedes	19	+15.766	2	4
6	44	(United Kingdom) Lewis Hamilton	Mercedes	19	+18.724	7	3
7	20	(Denmark) Kevin Magnussen	Haas-Ferrari	19	+25.161	8	2
8	27	(Germany) Nico Hülkenberg	Haas-Ferrari	19	+26.588	6	1
9	11	(Mexico) Sergio Pérez	Red Bull Racing-Honda RBPT	19	+29.950	11	
10	81	(Australia) Oscar Piastri	McLaren-Mercedes	19	+37.059^{a}	16	
11	22	(Japan) Yuki Tsunoda	RB-Honda RBPT	19	+38.363	9	
12	43	(Argentina) Franco Colapinto	Williams-Mercedes	19	+39.460	10	
13	18	(Canada) Lance Stroll	Aston Martin Aramco-Mercedes	19	+41.236	13	
14	10	(France) Pierre Gasly	Alpine-Renault	19	+41.995	12	
15	31	(France) Esteban Ocon	Alpine-Renault	19	+42.804	17	
16	30	(New Zealand) Liam Lawson	RB-Honda RBPT	19	+44.008	15	
17	23	(Thailand) Alexander Albon	Williams-Mercedes	19	+44.564	PL	
18	14	(Spain) Fernando Alonso	Aston Martin Aramco-Mercedes	19	+46.807	14	
19	24	(China) Zhou Guanyu	Kick Sauber-Ferrari	19	+52.842	19	
20	77	(Finland) Valtteri Bottas	Kick Sauber-Ferrari	19	+54.476	18	
Fastest lap: (Netherlands) Max Verstappen (Red Bull Racing-Honda RBPT) – 1:37.463 (lap 19)

Notes

- ^a – Oscar Piastri received a five-second time penalty for forcing Pierre Gasly off track. His final position was not affected by the penalty.

== Qualifying ==
Qualifying was held on October 19, 2024, at 17:00 local time (UTC–5), and determined the starting grid order for the main race.

=== Qualifying classification ===
Pos.	No.	Driver	Constructor	Qualifying times			Final grid
Pos.	No.	Driver	Constructor	Q1	Q2	Q3	Final grid
1	4	(United Kingdom) Lando Norris	McLaren-Mercedes	1:33.616	1:32.851	1:32.330	1
2	1	(Netherlands) Max Verstappen	Red Bull Racing-Honda RBPT	1:33.046	1:32.584	1:32.361	2
3	55	(Spain) Carlos Sainz Jr.	Ferrari	1:33.556	1:32.836	1:32.652	3
4	16	(Monaco) Charles Leclerc	Ferrari	1:33.241	1:32.962	1:32.740	4
5	81	(Australia) Oscar Piastri	McLaren-Mercedes	1:33.864	1:33.057	1:32.950	5
6	63	(United Kingdom) George Russell	Mercedes	1:33.536	1:33.142	1:32.974	PL^{a}
7	10	(France) Pierre Gasly	Alpine-Renault	1:33.550	1:33.162	1:33.018	6
8	14	(Spain) Fernando Alonso	Aston Martin Aramco-Mercedes	1:33.973	1:33.429	1:33.309	7
9	20	(Denmark) Kevin Magnussen	Haas-Ferrari	1:33.564	1:33.474	1:33.481	8
10	11	(Mexico) Sergio Pérez	Red Bull Racing-Honda RBPT	1:33.611	1:33.020	No time	9
11	22	(Japan) Yuki Tsunoda	RB-Honda RBPT	1:33.795	1:33.506	N/A	10
12	27	(Germany) Nico Hülkenberg	Haas-Ferrari	1:33.601	1:33.544	N/A	11
13	31	(France) Esteban Ocon	Alpine-Renault	1:33.986	1:33.597	N/A	12
14	18	(Canada) Lance Stroll	Aston Martin Aramco-Mercedes	1:34.033	1:33.759	N/A	13
15	30	(New Zealand) Liam Lawson	RB-Honda RBPT	1:33.339	No time	N/A	19^{b}
16	23	(Thailand) Alexander Albon	Williams-Mercedes	1:34.051	N/A	N/A	14
17	43	(Argentina) Franco Colapinto	Williams-Mercedes	1:34.062	N/A	N/A	15
18	77	(Finland) Valtteri Bottas	Kick Sauber-Ferrari	1:34.152	N/A	N/A	16
19	44	(United Kingdom) Lewis Hamilton	Mercedes	1:34.154	N/A	N/A	17
20	24	(China) Zhou Guanyu	Kick Sauber-Ferrari	1:34.228	N/A	N/A	18^{c}
107% time: 1:39.559

Notes

- ^a – George Russell qualified sixth, but was required to start the race from the pit lane as his car was modified under parc fermé conditions.
- ^b – Liam Lawson was required to start the race from the back of the grid for exceeding his quota of power unit elements.
- ^c – Zhou Guanyu received a five-place grid penalty for a fourth energy store.

== Race ==
The race was held on October 20, 2024, at 14:00 local time (UTC–5), and ran for 56 laps.

=== Race report ===
The race was won by Charles Leclerc, followed by Carlos Sainz Jr. for a Ferrari 1-2, their first in the USA since 2006. The former taking the lead on the start while the latter was blocked by the front duo of Max Verstappen and Lando Norris. Pole-sitter Norris finished third on track, before being demoted to fourth by a penalty for overtaking Max Verstappen off-track. Similar to the incident between Verstappen and Norris, Alex Albon made contact with Esteban Ocon, resulting in damage to Albon, while Ocon dropped to last. Liam Lawson (RB), recovered from 19th to 9th on his return to Formula One. Both Mercedes drivers faced problems; Lewis Hamilton spun off at Turn 19, bringing out the Safety Car, while teammate George Russell, who was penalized for forcing Valtteri Bottas off the track, recovered to sixth, having crashed out in qualifying.

=== Race classification ===
Pos.	No.	Driver	Constructor	Laps	Time/Retired	Grid	Points
1	16	(Monaco) Charles Leclerc	Ferrari	56	1:35:09.639	4	25
2	55	(Spain) Carlos Sainz Jr.	Ferrari	56	+8.562	3	18
3	1	(Netherlands) Max Verstappen	Red Bull Racing-Honda RBPT	56	+19.412	2	15
4	4	(United Kingdom) Lando Norris	McLaren-Mercedes	56	+20.354^{a}	1	12
5	81	(Australia) Oscar Piastri	McLaren-Mercedes	56	+21.921	5	10
6	63	(United Kingdom) George Russell	Mercedes	56	+56.295	PL	8
7	11	(Mexico) Sergio Pérez	Red Bull Racing-Honda RBPT	56	+59.072	9	6
8	27	(Germany) Nico Hülkenberg	Haas-Ferrari	56	+1:02.957	11	4
9	30	(New Zealand) Liam Lawson	RB-Honda RBPT	56	+1:10.563	19	2
10	43	(Argentina) Franco Colapinto	Williams-Mercedes	56	+1:11.979	15	1
11	20	(Denmark) Kevin Magnussen	Haas-Ferrari	56	+1:19.782	8	
12	10	(France) Pierre Gasly	Alpine-Renault	56	+1:30.558^{b}	6	
13	14	(Spain) Fernando Alonso	Aston Martin Aramco-Mercedes	55	+1 lap	7	
14	22	(Japan) Yuki Tsunoda	RB-Honda RBPT	55	+1 lap^{c}	10	
15	18	(Canada) Lance Stroll	Aston Martin Aramco-Mercedes	55	+1 lap	13	
16	23	(Thailand) Alexander Albon	Williams-Mercedes	55	+1 lap	14	
17	77	(Finland) Valtteri Bottas	Kick Sauber-Ferrari	55	+1 lap	16	
18	31	(France) Esteban Ocon	Alpine-Renault	55	+1 lap	12	
19	24	(China) Zhou Guanyu	Kick Sauber-Ferrari	55	+1 lap	18	
Ret	44	(United Kingdom) Lewis Hamilton	Mercedes	1	Spun off	17	
Fastest lap: (France) Esteban Ocon (Alpine-Renault) – 1:37.330 (lap 53)

Notes

- ^a – Lando Norris finished third, but received a five-second time penalty for leaving the track and gaining an advantage.
- ^b – Pierre Gasly received a five-second time penalty for leaving the track and gaining an advantage. His final position was not affected by the penalty.
- ^c – Yuki Tsunoda received a five-second time penalty for forcing Alexander Albon off track. His final position was not affected by the penalty.

== Championship standings after the race ==
Drivers' Championship standings

Pos.	Driver	Points
1	(Netherlands) **Max Verstappen***	354
2	(United Kingdom) **Lando Norris***	297
3	(Monaco) **Charles Leclerc***	275
4	(Australia) **Oscar Piastri***	247
5	(Spain) **Carlos Sainz Jr.***	215

Constructors' Championship standings

Pos.	Constructor	Points
1	(United Kingdom) **McLaren-Mercedes***	544
2	(Austria) **Red Bull Racing-Honda RBPT***	504
3	(Italy) **Ferrari***	496
4	(Germany) Mercedes	344
5	(United Kingdom) Aston Martin Aramco-Mercedes	86

- Note: Only the top five positions are included for both sets of standings.
- Competitor marked in bold and with an asterisk still has a theoretical chance of becoming World Champion.

Previous race: 2024 Singapore Grand Prix	FIA Formula One World Championship; 2024 season	Next race: 2024 Mexico City Grand Prix
Previous race: 2023 United States Grand Prix	United States Grand Prix	Next race: 2025 United States Grand Prix
