= Alpine A521 =

Alpine F1 Team's 2021 Formula One racing car

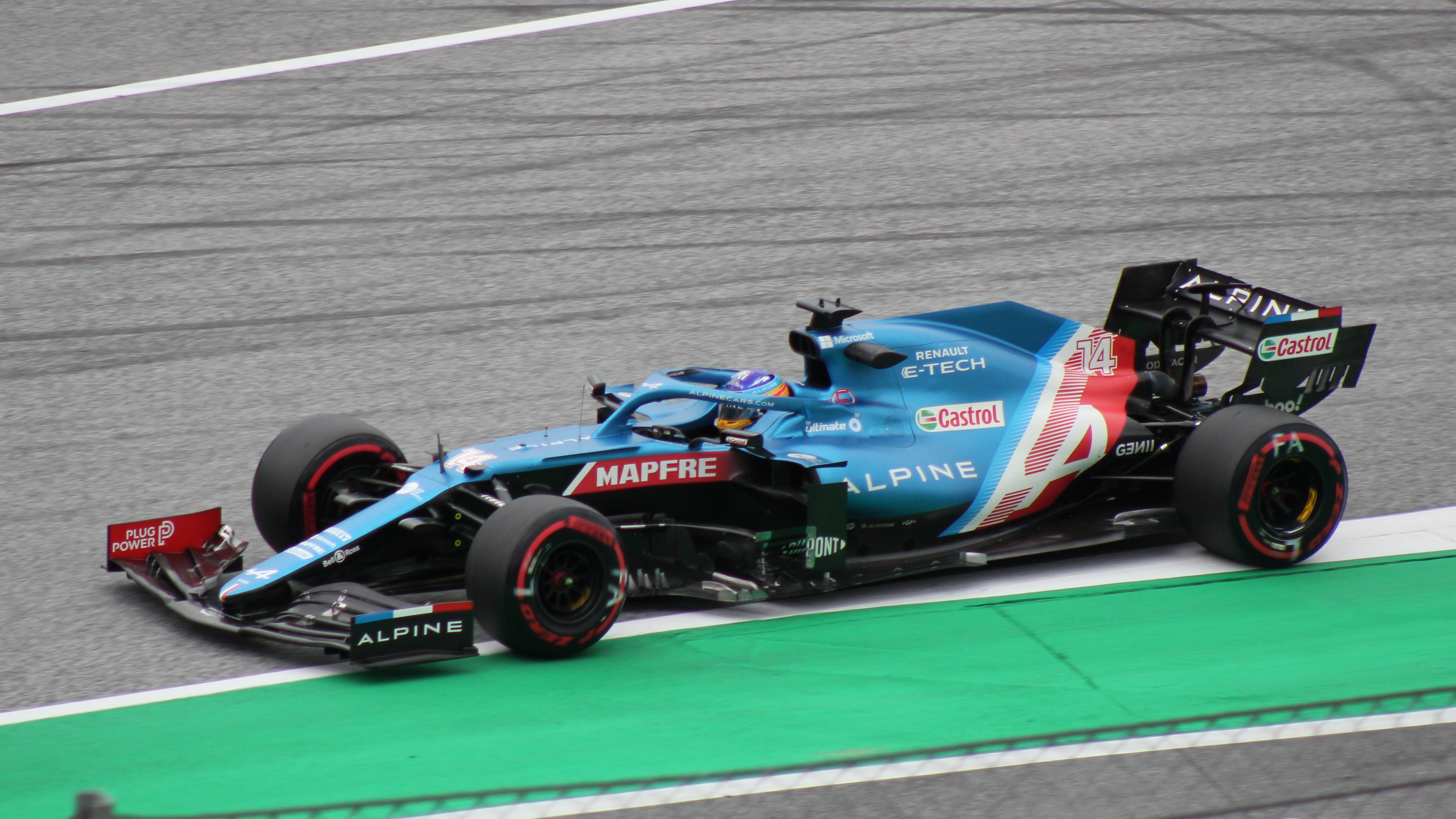
- Fernando Alonso in the A521 during the Austrian Grand Prix
- Category: Formula One
- Constructor: Alpine
- Designers: Pat Fry (Chief Technical Officer); Naoki Tokunaga (Chief Transformation Officer); Matt Harman (Engineering Director); Simon Virrill (Chief Designer); Benjamin Norton (Project Leader); Peter Marshall (Head of Composite Design); Pierre Genon (Head of Performance Systems); Dirk de Beer (Head of Aerodynamics); James Rodgers (Chief Aerodynamicist); Rémi Taffin (Engine Technical Director)
- Predecessor: Renault R.S.20
- Successor: Alpine A522

Technical specifications
- Engine: Mecachrome-built and assembled Renault E-Tech 20B 1.6 L (98 cu in) direct injection V6 turbocharged engine limited to 15,000 RPM rear mounted
- Transmission: Renault 8-speed + 1 reverse semi-automatic sequential
- Power: More than 950 hp (710 kW)
- Fuel: BP Ultimate
- Lubricants: Castrol
- Tyres: Pirelli P Zero (dry), Pirelli Cinturato (wet)

Competition history
- Notable entrants: Alpine F1 Team
- Notable drivers: 14. (Spain) Fernando Alonso; 31. (France) Esteban Ocon
- Debut: 2021 Bahrain Grand Prix
- First win: 2021 Hungarian Grand Prix
- Last win: 2021 Hungarian Grand Prix
- Last event: 2021 Abu Dhabi Grand Prix
Races	Wins	Podiums	Poles	F/Laps
21	1	2	0	0

The Alpine A521 is a Formula One car designed by the Alpine F1 Team which competed in the 2021 Formula One World Championship. It was driven by Fernando Alonso, marking his return to the sport, and Esteban Ocon. It was the first to be fielded under the team's Alpine name.

== Livery ==
The car was run in French blue with a French flag pattern towards the rear. Alpine ran a special livery for the Saudi Arabian Grand Prix to commemorate their 100th race with one of their sponsors Castrol. During the first practice session in the Abu Dhabi Grand Prix, Alpine's name in the rear wing of both cars was replaced by the phrase "El Plan" (Spanish for "the plan"), referencing an internet meme created by Alonso's fans in the wake of his return to Formula One.

== Season summary ==
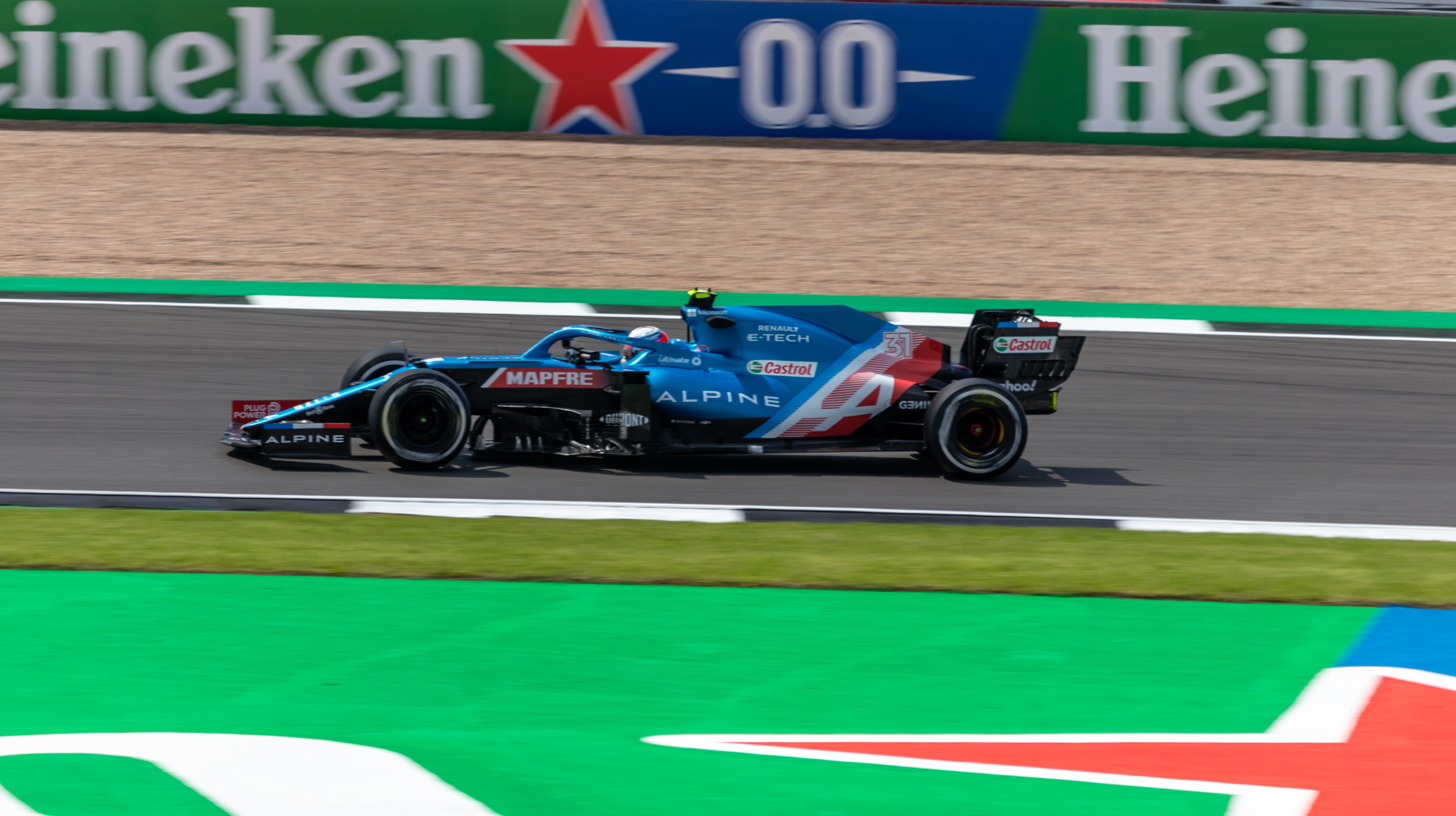
Ocon at the British Grand Prix.

The A521 proved to be a competitive car, securing 155 points during the season, allowing Alpine to finish 5th at the Constructors' Championship, picking up a victory and two podiums in the process. At the Hungarian Grand Prix, Ocon achieved his first victory in Formula One and Alonso secured his first podium since the 2014 Hungarian Grand Prix at the Qatar Grand Prix.

== Post-competition ==
In July 2024, Alpine gifted the A521 (the exact chassis with which Ocon took his victory at Hungary) to Ocon as a significance to his racing achievement. While complete with an engine, Ocon mention that there are several compenents were missing including batteries and ECUs, making it undrivable without proper maintenance.

== Complete Formula One results ==
(key)

Year	Entrant	Power unit	Tyres	Driver name	Grands Prix																						Points	WCC pos.
Year	Entrant	Power unit	Tyres	Driver name	BHR	EMI	POR	ESP	MON	AZE	FRA	STY	AUT	GBR	HUN	BEL^{‡}	NED	ITA	RUS	TUR	USA	MXC	SAP	QAT	SAU	ABU	Points	WCC pos.
2021	Alpine F1 Team	Renault; E-Tech 20B	P	(Spain) Fernando Alonso	Ret	10	8	17	13	6	8	9	10	7	4	11	6	8	6	16	Ret	9	9	3	13	8	155	5th
2021	Alpine F1 Team	Renault; E-Tech 20B	P	(France) Esteban Ocon	13	9	7	9	9	Ret	14	14	Ret	9	1	7	9	10	14	10	Ret	13	8	5	4	9	155	5th

Notes

^{†} Driver failed to finish the race, but was classified as they had completed over 90% of the winner's race distance.
^{‡} Half points awarded as less than 75% of race distance completed.
