= 2024 Bahrain Grand Prix =

First round of the 2024 Formula One season

Race 1 of 24 in the 2024 Formula One World Championship
Next race →
- Layout of the Bahrain International Circuit

Race details
- Date: 2 March 2024
- Official name: Formula 1 Gulf Air Bahrain Grand Prix 2024
- Location: Bahrain International Circuit; Sakhir, Bahrain
- Course: Permanent racing facility
- Course length: 5.412 km (3.363 miles)
- Distance: 57 laps, 308.238 km (190.253 miles)
- Weather: Clear
- Attendance: 100,000

Pole position
Driver	(Netherlands) Max Verstappen	Red Bull Racing-Honda RBPT
- Time: 1:29.179

Fastest lap
Driver	(Netherlands) Max Verstappen	Red Bull Racing-Honda RBPT
- Time: 1:32.608 on lap 39

Podium
First	(Netherlands) Max Verstappen	Red Bull Racing-Honda RBPT
Second	(Mexico) Sergio Pérez	Red Bull Racing-Honda RBPT
Third	(Spain) Carlos Sainz Jr.	Ferrari

The 2024 Bahrain Grand Prix (officially known as the Formula 1 Gulf Air Bahrain Grand Prix 2024) was a Formula One motor race held on 2 March 2024 at the Bahrain International Circuit in Sakhir, Bahrain. It was the opening round of the 2024 Formula One World Championship.

After taking pole position in qualifying, Max Verstappen of Red Bull Racing led every lap, won the race, and had the fastest lap, his fifth career grand chelem. His teammate Sergio Pérez finished in second, followed by Carlos Sainz Jr. of Ferrari.

== Background ==
The event was held across 29 February – 2 March. It was the opening round of the 2024 Formula One World Championship and the twentieth running of the Bahrain Grand Prix. It also marked the 20th anniversary of the first Bahrain Grand Prix held in 2004.

The Grand Prix began at 18:00 local time (UTC+3) on Saturday, 2 March 2024, becoming the first Formula One World Championship Grand Prix season-opener race to start on a Saturday since the 1982 South African Grand Prix. The event was held on Saturday to comply with regulations that require a minimum of one week between Grands Prix, as the following Grand Prix in Saudi Arabia was scheduled to take place on 9 March. The Saudi Arabian Grand Prix was moved a day forward from Sunday to avoid a conflict with start of Ramadan, which was expected to begin on 10 March.

=== Entrants ===
The drivers and teams were the same as the season entry list with no additional stand-in drivers for the race.

=== Tyre choices ===
Tyre supplier Pirelli brought the C1, C2, and C3 tyre compounds (the three hardest in their range) designated hard, medium, and soft, respectively, for teams to use at the event.

== Practice ==
Three free practice sessions were held for the event. The first free practice session was held on 29 February 2024, at 14:30 local time (UTC+3), and was topped by Daniel Ricciardo of RB ahead of Lando Norris and Oscar Piastri, both of McLaren. The second free practice session was held on the same day, at 18:00 local time, and was topped by Lewis Hamilton ahead of George Russell, both of Mercedes, and Fernando Alonso of Aston Martin. The third free practice session was held on 1 March 2024, at 15:30 local time, and was topped by Carlos Sainz Jr. of Ferrari ahead of Fernando Alonso of Aston Martin and Max Verstappen of Red Bull Racing.

== Qualifying ==
Qualifying was held on 1 March 2024, at 19:00 local time (UTC+3).

=== Qualifying classification ===
Pos.	No.	Driver	Constructor	Qualifying times			Final grid
Pos.	No.	Driver	Constructor	Q1	Q2	Q3	Final grid
1	1	(Netherlands) Max Verstappen	Red Bull Racing-Honda RBPT	1:30.031	1:29.374	1:29.179	1
2	16	(Monaco) Charles Leclerc	Ferrari	1:30.243	1:29.165	1:29.407	2
3	63	(United Kingdom) George Russell	Mercedes	1:30.350	1:29.922	1:29.485	3
4	55	(Spain) Carlos Sainz Jr.	Ferrari	1:29.909	1:29.573	1:29.507	4
5	11	(Mexico) Sergio Pérez	Red Bull Racing-Honda RBPT	1:30.221	1:29.932	1:29.537	5
6	14	(Spain) Fernando Alonso	Aston Martin Aramco-Mercedes	1:30.179	1:29.801	1:29.542	6
7	4	(United Kingdom) Lando Norris	McLaren-Mercedes	1:30.143	1:29.941	1:29.614	7
8	81	(Australia) Oscar Piastri	McLaren-Mercedes	1:30.531	1:30.122	1:29.683	8
9	44	(United Kingdom) Lewis Hamilton	Mercedes	1:30.451	1:29.718	1:29.710	9
10	27	(Germany) Nico Hülkenberg	Haas-Ferrari	1:30.566	1:29.851	1:30.502	10
11	22	(Japan) Yuki Tsunoda	RB-Honda RBPT	1:30.481	1:30.129	N/A	11
12	18	(Canada) Lance Stroll	Aston Martin Aramco-Mercedes	1:29.965	1:30.200	N/A	12
13	23	(Thailand) Alexander Albon	Williams-Mercedes	1:30.397	1:30.221	N/A	13
14	3	(Australia) Daniel Ricciardo	RB-Honda RBPT	1:30.562	1:30.278	N/A	14
15	20	(Denmark) Kevin Magnussen	Haas-Ferrari	1:30.646	1:30.529	N/A	15
16	77	(Finland) Valtteri Bottas	Kick Sauber-Ferrari	1:30.756	N/A	N/A	16
17	24	(China) Zhou Guanyu	Kick Sauber-Ferrari	1:30.757	N/A	N/A	17
18	2	(United States) Logan Sargeant	Williams-Mercedes	1:30.770	N/A	N/A	18
19	31	(France) Esteban Ocon	Alpine-Renault	1:30.793	N/A	N/A	19
20	10	(France) Pierre Gasly	Alpine-Renault	1:30.948	N/A	N/A	20
107% time: 1:36.202

== Race ==
The race was held on 2 March 2024, at 18:00 local time (UTC+3), and was run for 57 laps.

=== Race report ===
Max Verstappen won the race ahead of teammate Sergio Pérez and Carlos Sainz Jr. He led every lap and took fastest lap, for his fifth career grand chelem. Charles Leclerc finished fourth despite suffering brake problems throughout the race. Mercedes were hampered by engine cooling and ERS battery issues as their drivers George Russell and Lewis Hamilton finished fifth and seventh, respectively. McLaren finished with a sixth place for Lando Norris and an eighth place for Oscar Piastri. It was the first season-opening race in Formula One history without any retirements.

=== Race classification ===
Pos.	No.	Driver	Constructor	Laps	Time/Retired	Grid	Points
1	1	(Netherlands) Max Verstappen	Red Bull Racing-Honda RBPT	57	1:31:44.742	1	26^{1}
2	11	(Mexico) Sergio Pérez	Red Bull Racing-Honda RBPT	57	+22.457	5	18
3	55	(Spain) Carlos Sainz Jr.	Ferrari	57	+25.110	4	15
4	16	(Monaco) Charles Leclerc	Ferrari	57	+39.669	2	12
5	63	(United Kingdom) George Russell	Mercedes	57	+46.788	3	10
6	4	(United Kingdom) Lando Norris	McLaren-Mercedes	57	+48.458	7	8
7	44	(United Kingdom) Lewis Hamilton	Mercedes	57	+50.324	9	6
8	81	(Australia) Oscar Piastri	McLaren-Mercedes	57	+56.082	8	4
9	14	(Spain) Fernando Alonso	Aston Martin Aramco-Mercedes	57	+1:14.887	6	2
10	18	(Canada) Lance Stroll	Aston Martin Aramco-Mercedes	57	+1:33.216	12	1
11	24	(China) Zhou Guanyu	Kick Sauber-Ferrari	56	+1 lap	17	
12	20	(Denmark) Kevin Magnussen	Haas-Ferrari	56	+1 lap	15	
13	3	(Australia) Daniel Ricciardo	RB-Honda RBPT	56	+1 lap	14	
14	22	(Japan) Yuki Tsunoda	RB-Honda RBPT	56	+1 lap	11	
15	23	(Thailand) Alexander Albon	Williams-Mercedes	56	+1 lap	13	
16	27	(Germany) Nico Hülkenberg	Haas-Ferrari	56	+1 lap	10	
17	31	(France) Esteban Ocon	Alpine-Renault	56	+1 lap	19	
18	10	(France) Pierre Gasly	Alpine-Renault	56	+1 lap	20	
19	77	(Finland) Valtteri Bottas	Kick Sauber-Ferrari	56	+1 lap	16	
20	2	(United States) Logan Sargeant	Williams-Mercedes	55	+2 laps	18	
Fastest lap: (Netherlands) Max Verstappen (Red Bull Racing-Honda RBPT) – 1:32.608 (lap 39)

Notes

- ^1 – Includes one point for fastest lap.

== Championship standings after the race ==
Drivers' Championship standings

Pos.	Driver	Points
1	(Netherlands) Max Verstappen	26
2	(Mexico) Sergio Pérez	18
3	(Spain) Carlos Sainz Jr.	15
4	(Monaco) Charles Leclerc	12
5	(United Kingdom) George Russell	10

Constructors' Championship standings

Pos.	Constructor	Points
1	(Austria) Red Bull Racing-Honda RBPT	44
2	(Italy) Ferrari	27
3	(Germany) Mercedes	16
4	(United Kingdom) McLaren-Mercedes	12
5	(United Kingdom) Aston Martin Aramco-Mercedes	3

- Note: Only the top five positions are included for both sets of standings.

== See also ==
- 2024 Sakhir Formula 2 round
- 2024 Sakhir Formula 3 round

Previous race: 2023 Abu Dhabi Grand Prix	FIA Formula One World Championship; 2024 season	Next race: 2024 Saudi Arabian Grand Prix
Previous race: 2023 Bahrain Grand Prix	Bahrain Grand Prix	Next race: 2025 Bahrain Grand Prix
