= Bruno Famin =

Team principal of Alpine F1 Team

- Born: Bruno Remy Perrick Famin; 1962 (age 63–64); Belfort, France
- Occupation: Deputy director of Automobile Club de l'Ouest

Bruno Remy Perrick Famin is a French automotive engineer. He has been the deputy director of the Automobile Club de l'Ouest since March 2026.

Previously, Famin served as vice president of Alpine Motorsport. He left the role of team principal of Alpine F1 Team in August 2024, being replaced by Oliver Oakes. He has since moved to Renault's mainline motorsports divisions.

He was technical director of Peugeot Sport before taking command of the latter in 2012. In 2019, he became director of operations for the FIA.

== Biography ==
He obtained his engineering degree from the National School of Arts and Crafts. In 1986, he began his professional career in logistics and transport in West Africa. After continuing his studies at the Ecole Nationale Supérieure du Pétrole et des Moteurs, joined Peugeot Talbot Sport in 1989, where he joined the design office of the customer racing department as a development engineer. In 1994, he left the competition remaining within Groupe PSA, and became a project manager, from where he left for Argentina before returning to France. In 2005, he became technical director of Peugeot Sport. In 2012, he was appointed director of Peugeot Sport, succeeding Olivier Quesnel.

In 2019, he left Peugeot Sport and joined the International Automobile Federation (FIA), where he became director of operations for the sports branch.

Famin became CEO in charge of engine development for the Alpine F1 Team in February 2022. He also oversaw Alpine's FIA World Endurance Championship programme and Dacia's World Rally-Raid Championship team.

In March 2026, with Alpine set to shutter the WEC division, Famin left the company and took a new role at the Automobile Club de l'Ouest as deputy director.
