= Matt Harman =

British Formula One engineer

- Born: Matthew Harman
- Occupation: Engineer
- Employer: Williams Racing
- Known for: Formula One engineer
- Title: Design Director

Matthew Harman is a British Formula One engineer. He is currently the Technical Director for Engineering for the Williams Racing Formula One team.

== Career ==
Harman began his career at Ricardo, before moving to Mercedes AMG High Performance Powertrains in Brixworth. He later relocated to Brackley, serving as Head of Transmission and Powertrain Integration during a period of dominance for the Silver Arrows. In September 2018, Harman joined the Renault F1 Team as Deputy Chief Design before being promoted to engineering director in May 2019. In February 2022, Harman was promoted to Technical Director of Alpine F1 Team. He held this position until his departure from the team in March 2024. In September 2024, he joined Williams Racing as design director. In July 2025, Harman was promoted to Technical Director for Engineering.
