= Alpine A525 =

2025 Formula One car

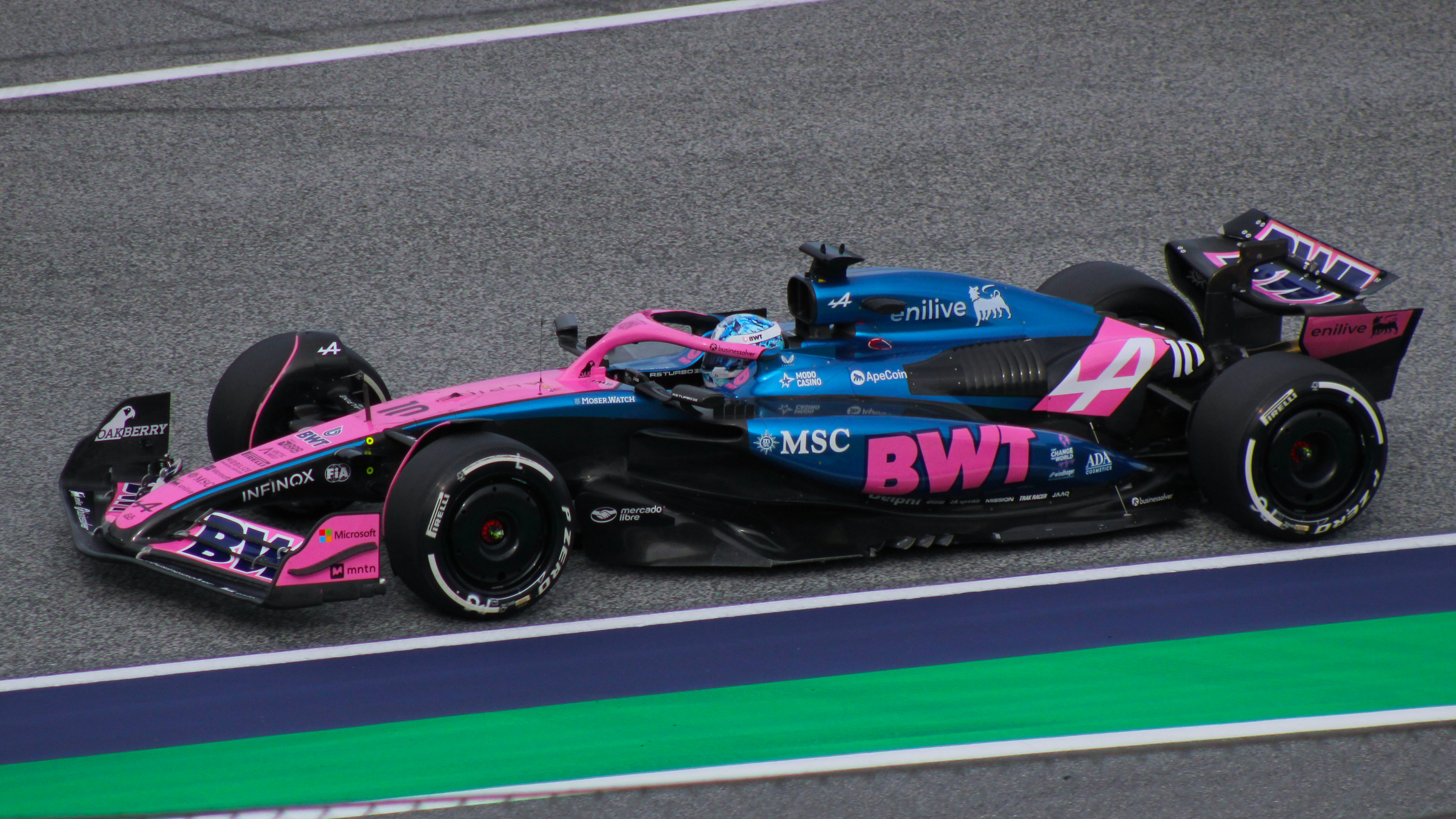
- An A525 driven by Pierre Gasly during the Austrian Grand Prix
- Category: Formula One
- Designers: David Sanchez (Executive Technical Director); Joe Burnell (Technical Director, Engineering); Ciaron Pilbeam (Technical Director, Performance); David Wheater (Technical Director, Aerodynamics); Simon Virrill (Chief Engineer - Technical); Jacopo Fantoni (Deputy Chief Engineer); Benjamin Norton (Head of Engineering); Richard Frith (Head of Performance); Vin Dhanani (Head of Vehicle Performance); Michael Broadhurst (Chief Aerodynamicist); Eric Meignan (Engine Technical Director)
- Predecessor: Alpine A524
- Successor: Alpine A526

Technical specifications
- Engine: Mecachrome-built and assembled Renault E-Tech RE25 1.6 L (98 cu in) direct injection V6 turbocharged engine limited to 15,000 RPM in a mid-mounted, rear-wheel drive layout 1.6 L (98 cu in) Turbo Rear-mid mounted
- Electric motor: Kinetic and thermal energy recovery systems
- Weight: 800 kg (including driver, excluding fuel)
- Fuel: BP
- Lubricants: Castrol
- Tyres: Pirelli P Zero (Dry/Slick); Pirelli Cinturato (Wet/Treaded)

Competition history
- Notable entrants: BWT Alpine F1 Team
- Notable drivers: 7. (Australia) Jack Doohan; 10. (France) Pierre Gasly; 43. (Argentina) Franco Colapinto
- Debut: 2025 Australian Grand Prix
- Last event: 2025 Abu Dhabi Grand Prix
| Races | Wins | Podiums | Poles | F/Laps |
|---|---|---|---|---|
| 24 | 0 | 0 | 0 | 0 |

The Alpine A525 is a Formula One racing car designed and developed by the Alpine F1 Team for competition in the 2025 Formula One World Championship. It is the fifth Formula One car entered by Alpine since rebranding from Renault. The A525 was driven by Pierre Gasly, who was on his third season with the team, and a "rotating seat" that consisted of rookie driver Jack Doohan, who raced with the team from Australia to the Miami Grand Prix, and Franco Colapinto, who replaced Doohan starting from the Emilia Romagna Grand Prix for the remainder of the season. Paul Aron, Ryō Hirakawa, and Kush Maini all assumed reserve driver roles, with Colapinto previously holding such a role before being swapped with Doohan. The car was revealed at a bespoke event on 18 February 2025, and made its competitive debut at the 2025 Australian Grand Prix.

The A525 is the first Alpine Formula One car to utilise Eni fuels and lubricants; their previous suppliers, BP and Castrol, are set to supply fuels and lubricants, respectively, to the Audi Formula One team from the 2026 season onwards. It will also be the last Alpine car and last F1 car overall for the foreseeable future to utilise Renault engines as Renault has chosen to cease its engine development and supply programme at the end of 2025, with the Alpine team switching to Mercedes engines in 2026. The car's underperformance led to Alpine finishing last in the Constructors' Championship, the worst finish Team Enstone had achieved.

== Livery ==
Alpine unveiled the car at the F1 75 Live event on 18 February 2025. The car's livery was largely similar to the Alpine A521, with the return of the French national racing colour, Bleu de France, that was present on that car and pink accentuating the BWT text on the sidepods and the front end of the car. The Mercado Libre colours were added to the car through the Americas triple-header (United States, Mexico City, São Paulo), with the logo of Xbox Game Studios' The Outer Worlds 2 being featured at the Mexico City Grand Prix.

== Competition and development history ==
=== Opening rounds ===
The A525 made its competitive debut In Australia, where Gasly qualified ninth and Doohan fourteenth. Doohan crashed early in the race while Gasly finished eleventh, finishing their first race weekend with no points. The Chinese, and first, sprint event saw both Alpines qualify sixteenth and seventeenth, and Gasly recovered to twelfth while Doohan finished last after obtaining a penalty for hitting Gabriel Bortoleto. Subsequent Q1 exits followed in the Grand Prix with Gasly in sixteenth and Doohan in eighteenth. Gasly finished eleventh in the Grand Prix, but was disqualified due to his chassis being underweight. Doohan finished in thirteenth.

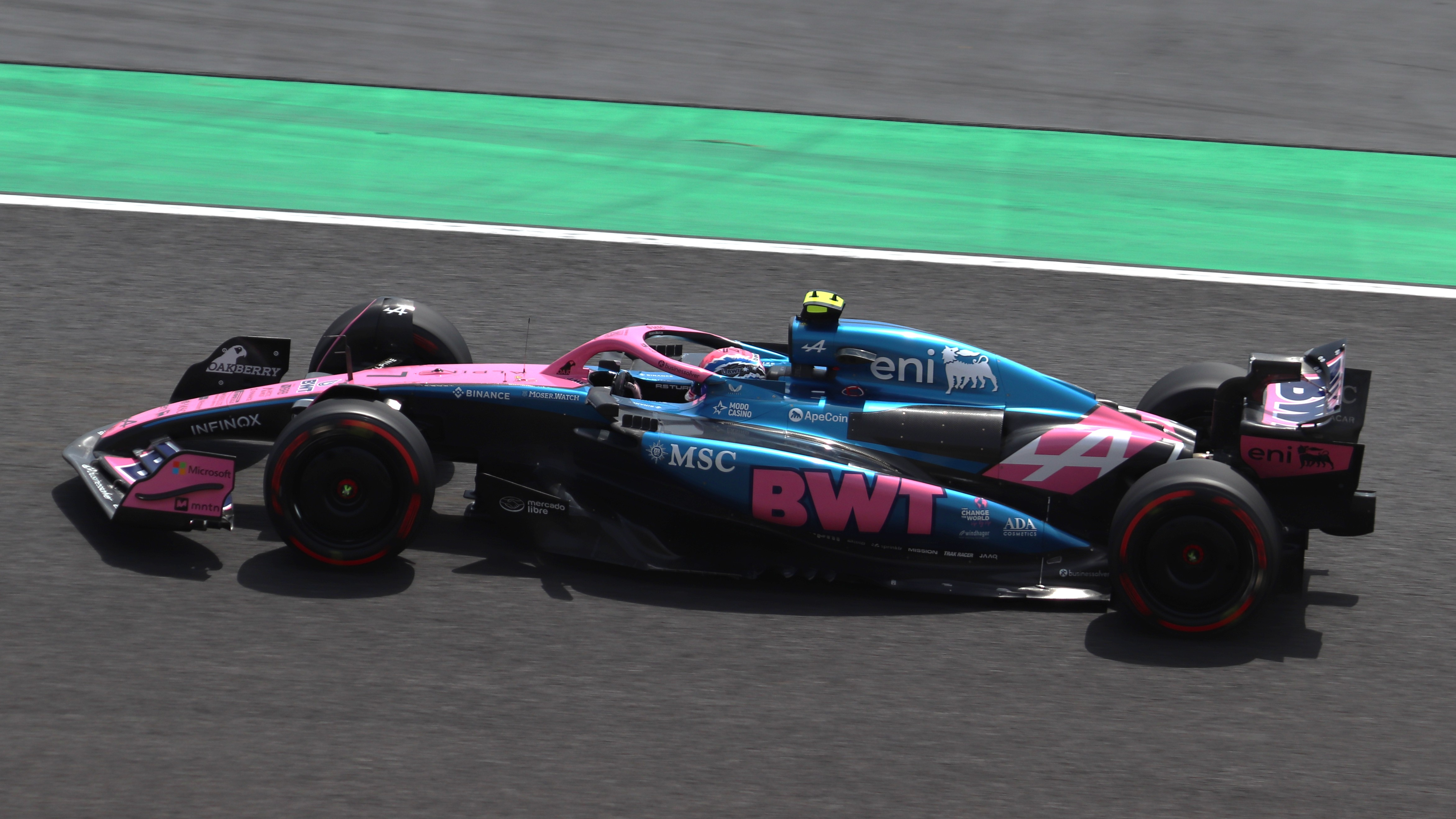
Doohan took 15th during the Japanese Grand Prix.

Reserve driver Ryō Hirakawa, who would make his only appearance in an Alpine car before moving to Haas due to his connections with Toyota, drove Doohan's car for the first practice session of his home race at Suzuka Circuit. Doohan returned to, and experienced a very heavy crash to, his car after it experienced a very heavy spin by the first turn hairpin due to taking it with the drag reduction system on in the second practice. Doohan qualified nineteenth and finished fifteenth, while Gasly qualified eleventh and finished thirteenth. In Bahrain, Gasly qualified a high of fifth, but Doohan was eleventh; both drivers finished in seventh and fourteenth respectively, with Gasly picking up Alpine's first points of the season. The ninth-placed Gasly outqualified championship leader Lando Norris in Jeddah after the latter did not set a time in Q3, while Doohan found himself in seventeenth again. However, early on Gasly experienced the wall after hitting his old teammate Yuki Tsunoda, while Doohan remained in seventeenth.

The Miami sprint saw Gasly qualified thirteenth and Doohan, once again, in seventeenth. Gasly picked up one point for Alpine by finishing in eighth, the last points-paying position, while Doohan made up only one position to finish in sixteenth. For the Grand Prix, Gasly was outqualified for the first time by Doohan by virtue of the Australian driver qualifying in fourteenth to Gasly's eighteenth. However, during the race Doohan hit Liam Lawson to retire immediately while Gasly finished thirteenth.

=== Mid-season rounds ===
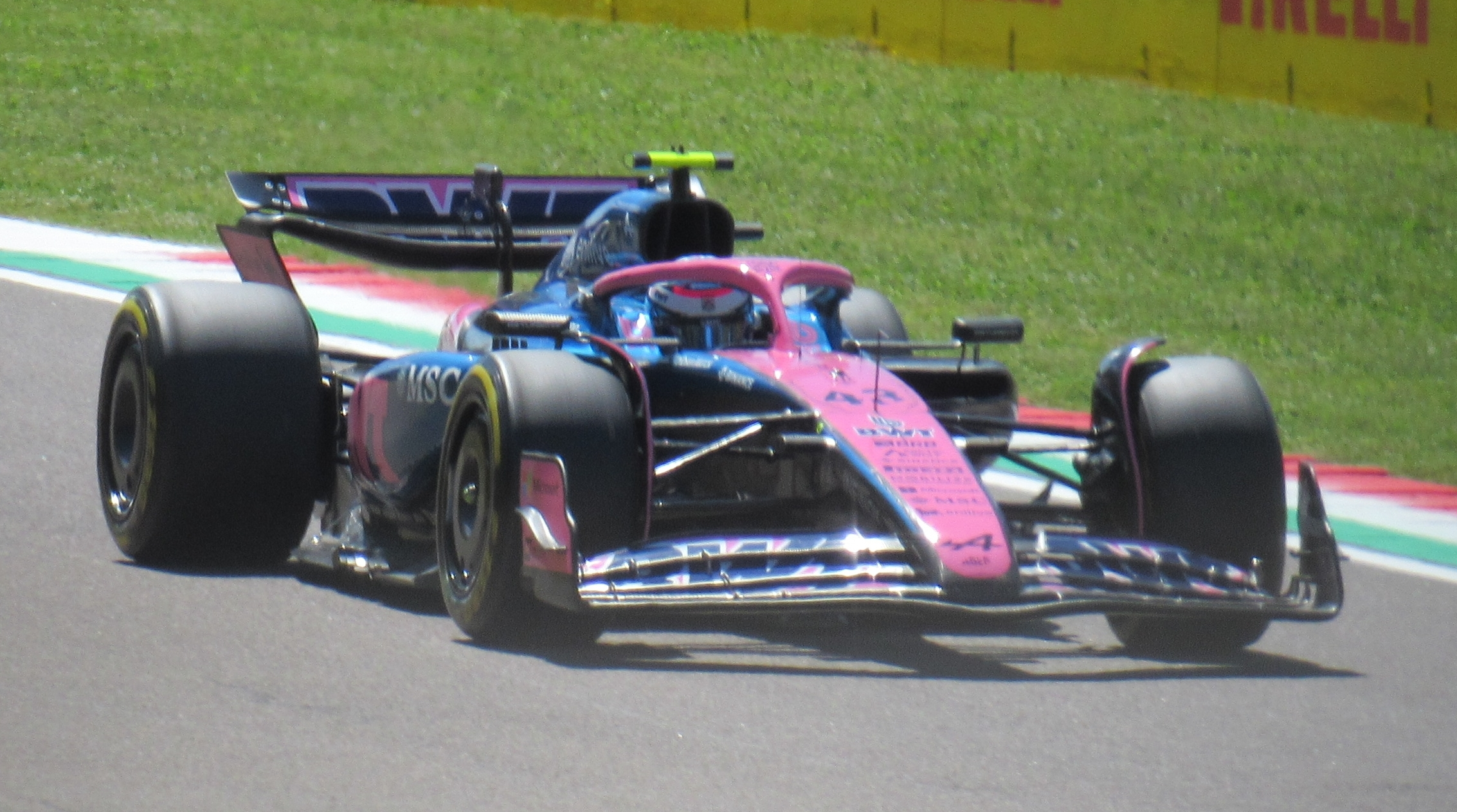
On his Alpine debut, Franco Colapinto would crash the car during qualification for the Emilia Romagna Grand Prix. He would finish in sixteenth.

Ahead of the race in Imola, Doohan was replaced by Franco Colapinto on a "rotating seat" basis. Colapinto crashed out of qualifying despite making it to Q2, and by virtue of a one-place grid penalty entering the fast lane in the pit lane before a re-start time was confirmed after Tsunoda's big crash in the first session, started sixteenth - where he would finish in the race. Gasly started in tenth, and finished thirteenth. Colapinto converted last place to a thirteenth-place finish at Monaco while Gasly converted his eighteenth-place start to a DNF after hitting Tsunoda again. In Spain, the car's livery was modified to commemorate the 70th anniversary of Automobiles Alpine. Colapinto qualified nineteenth, started eighteenth, and finished fifteenth while Gasly qualified and finished eighth, picking up more points for the team.

Colapinto outqualified Gasly at the Canadian Grand Prix, as the latter qualified last compared to Colapinto's twelfth (tenth place starting grid). Colapinto slipped to thirteenth and Gasly rose to fifteenth. Gasly spun during qualifying in Austria, started tenth, and finished in thirteenth, while Colapinto qualified in fourteenth, forced former Alpine junior and championship leader Oscar Piastri off the track, received a five-second penalty, and finished in fifteenth. Colapinto slipped into the wall once again in qualifying at the British Grand Prix, was put into a pit lane start due to exceeding his limit of power unit elements, and pulled into the pit lane during the formation lap due to transmission troubles. Gasly finished in sixth, Alpine's highest finish of the season, from eighth on the grid.

== Complete Formula One results ==
Key

Key
| Colour | Result |
|---|---|
| Gold | Winner |
| Silver | Second place |
| Bronze | Third place |
| Green | Other points position |
| Blue | Other classified position |
| Blue | Not classified, finished (NC) |
| Purple | Not classified, retired (Ret) |
| Red | Did not qualify (DNQ) |
| Black | Disqualified (DSQ) |
| White | Did not start (DNS) |
| White | Race cancelled (C) |
| Blank | Did not practice (DNP) |
| Blank | Excluded (EX) |
| Blank | Did not arrive (DNA) |
| Blank | Withdrawn (WD) |
| Blank | Did not enter (empty cell) |
| Annotation | Meaning |
| P | Pole position |
| F | Fastest lap |
| Superscript number | Points-scoring position in sprint |

| Year | Entrant | Power unit | Tyres | Driver name | Grands Prix | | | | | | | | | | | | | | | | | | | | | | | | Points | WCC pos. |
| Year | Entrant | Power unit | Tyres | Driver name | AUS | CHN | JPN | BHR | SAU | MIA | EMI | MON | ESP | CAN | AUT | GBR | BEL | HUN | NED | ITA | AZE | SIN | USA | MXC | SAP | LVG | QAT | ABU | Points | WCC pos. |
|---|---|---|---|---|---|---|---|---|---|---|---|---|---|---|---|---|---|---|---|---|---|---|---|---|---|---|---|---|---|---|
| 2025 | Alpine F1 Team | Renault RE25 1.6 turbo-hybrid V6 | P | (Australia) Jack Doohan | Ret | 13 | 15 | 14 | 17 | Ret | | | | | | | | | | | | | | | | | | | 22 | 10th |
| 2025 | Alpine F1 Team | Renault RE25 1.6 turbo-hybrid V6 | P | (Argentina) Franco Colapinto | | | | | | | 16 | 13 | 15 | 13 | 15 | DNS | 19 | 18 | 11 | 17 | 19 | 16 | 17 | 16 | 15 | 15 | 14 | 20 | 22 | 10th |
| 2025 | Alpine F1 Team | Renault RE25 1.6 turbo-hybrid V6 | P | (France) Pierre Gasly | 11 | DSQ | 13 | 7 | Ret | 13^{8} | 13 | Ret | 8 | 15 | 13 | 6 | 10 | 19 | 17 | 16 | 18 | 19 | 19 | 15 | 10^{8} | 13 | 16 | 19 | 22 | 10th |
