= Alpine A526 =

2026 Formula One car

- Pierre Gasly driving the Alpine A526 at the Austrian Grand Prix
- Category: Formula One
- Constructor: Alpine
- Designers: David Sanchez (Executive Technical Director); Joe Burnell (Technical Director, Engineering); Ciaron Pilbeam (Technical Director, Performance); Simon Virrill (Chief Engineer - Technical); Steve Booth (Chief Engineer - Car Design); Jacopo Fantoni (Deputy Chief Engineer); Benjamin Norton (Head of Engineering); Vin Dhanani (Head of Vehicle Performance); Kristopher Midgley (Head of Aerodynamics); Michael Broadhurst (Chief Aerodynamicist)
- Predecessor: Alpine A525

Technical specifications
- Chassis: Carbon fibre composite with survival cell and honeycomb structure
- Suspension (front): Double wishbone pull-rod
- Suspension (rear): Double wishbone push-rod
- Engine: Mercedes-AMG W17 E Performance 1.6 L V6 turbo rear-mid mounted
- Transmission: 8 forward + 1 reverse
- Weight: 770 kg (including driver, coolant and oil)
- Fuel: Petronas
- Lubricants: Petronas
- Tyres: Pirelli P Zero (Dry/Slick); Pirelli Cinturato (Wet/Treaded)

Competition history
- Notable entrants: BWT Alpine F1 Team
- Notable drivers: 10. (France) Pierre Gasly; 43. (Argentina) Franco Colapinto
- Debut: 2026 Australian Grand Prix
- Last event: 2026 São Paulo Grand Prix
Races	Wins	Podiums	Poles	F/Laps
20	0	0	1	0

The Alpine A526 is a Formula One car designed and built by the Alpine F1 Team to compete in the 2026 Formula One World Championship. It is the sixth Formula One car entered by Alpine since rebranding from Renault, and the first car built by Team Enstone since the Lotus E23 Hybrid (2015) to use a Mercedes power unit. It is currently being driven by Pierre Gasly, in his fourth season with the team, and Franco Colapinto, who begins his second season with the team after replacing Jack Doohan following the seventh round of the 2025 season.

== Characteristics ==
=== Development ===
==== Regulation changes ====
For 2026, Formula One underwent significant changes to its regulations revolving around the car's aerodynamics and engine. Due to this, Alpine's A526 features significant changes from its predecessor, the A525.

==== Reveal ====
On 21 January 2026, the A526 underwent a shakedown at the Silverstone Circuit. The A526's livery, which is similar to the previous year's, was first unveiled on 23 January 2026 on an MSC Cruises cruise ship off the coast of Barcelona, Spain.

== Competition history ==
Colapinto scored his first point of the year with 10th at the Chinese Grand Prix.

In the opening round, Gasly scored a point, battling with Esteban Ocon in the closing stages. At the Chinese Grand Prix, the car proved to be more competitive than its predecessor due to both drivers finishing in the top ten, sixth for Gasly and tenth for Colapinto, respectively. In Japan, a seventh place finish for Gasly, battling with Max Verstappen, put the team in the top five in the championship, overtaking Red Bull Racing in the process, with Colapinto having a finish outside the top ten for the second time this season. At the Miami Grand Prix, Gasly abandoned the race after being hit by Liam Lawson on lap five, while Colapinto scored six points after finishing in seventh place, thus taking the latter's highest finishing position in his career. At the next race, Colapinto once again took his own highest finishing position after claiming 6th place, with Gasly taking 8th place. In Monaco, Gasly originally took Alpine's first podium since 2024 after claiming 3rd place. However, an appeal lodged by several other teams concerning penalties Gasly received that were rescinded was approved in early September, and Gasly was subsequently stripped of his podium and demoted to seventh place.

== Complete Formula One results ==
Key

Key
Colour	Result
Gold	Winner
Silver	Second place
Bronze	Third place
Green	Other points position
Blue	Other classified position
Blue	Not classified, finished (NC)
Purple	Not classified, retired (Ret)
Red	Did not qualify (DNQ)
Black	Disqualified (DSQ)
White	Did not start (DNS)
White	Race cancelled (C)
Blank	Did not practice (DNP)
Blank	Excluded (EX)
Blank	Did not arrive (DNA)
Blank	Withdrawn (WD)
Blank	Did not enter (empty cell)
Annotation	Meaning
P	Pole position
F	Fastest lap
Superscript number	Points-scoring position in sprint

Year	Entrant	Power unit	Tyres	Driver name	Grands Prix																							Points	WCC pos.
Year	Entrant	Power unit	Tyres	Driver name	AUS	CHN	JPN	MIA	CAN	MON	BCN	AUT	GBR	BEL	HUN	NED	ITA	ESP	AZE	BHR	SIN	USA	MXC	SAP	LVG	QAT	ABU	Points	WCC pos.
2026	Alpine F1 Team	Mercedes 1.6 V6 t	P	(Argentina) Franco Colapinto	14	10	16	7	6	14	10	15	9	10	15	14	9	7	Ret	13	Ret	Ret	15	13				69*	6th*
2026	Alpine F1 Team	Mercedes 1.6 V6 t	P	(France) Pierre Gasly	10	6	7	Ret^{8}	8	7	7	13	10	11	12	10^{8}	7^{P}	12	Ret	16	11	10	17	14				69*	6th*

* Season still in progress.
