= A525 =

A525 may refer to:

- A525 road, a road in England
- Alpine A525, used by Alpine F1 Team in the 2025 Formula One World Championship
