= Richard Lockwood (engineer) =

British engineer

- Born: February 17, 1981 (age 45); Panama City, United States
- Education: Oxford Brookes University
- Occupation: Engineer
- Title: Alpine F1 Team Sporting director

Richard Lockwood (born 17 February 1981) is a British Formula One engineer. He is the Sporting Director at the Alpine Formula One Team.

== Career ==
Lockwood studied Automotive Engineering at Oxford Brookes University, graduating in 2003. He began his career in motorsport with Slark Race Engineering, working across a range of race programmes and developing experience in vehicle performance and data analysis. In 2007 he joined Bridgestone Motorsport, initially as an engineer supporting Formula One tyre operations. He was later promoted to Assistant Chief Engineer, where he played a key role in tyre performance analysis, trackside support and the integration of tyre data into team strategy during Bridgestone's final years as Formula One's sole tyre supplier.

Following Bridgestone's withdrawal from Formula One, Lockwood moved to Marussia F1 Team in 2011 as Tyre and Strategy Engineer, combining tyre performance modelling with race-strategy development for the Banbury-based team. In 2014 he joined Williams Racing as Head of Race Strategy. Over more than a decade at Grove, Lockwood led the team's strategic operations, overseeing race-strategy planning, live decision-making and simulation-based preparation across multiple regulatory eras. In January 2025, Lockwood was appointed Sporting Director of Alpine F1 Team, assuming responsibility for the team's sporting operations, including regulatory liaison, race-weekend execution and strategic coordination between trackside and factory functions.
