= Otello Valenti =

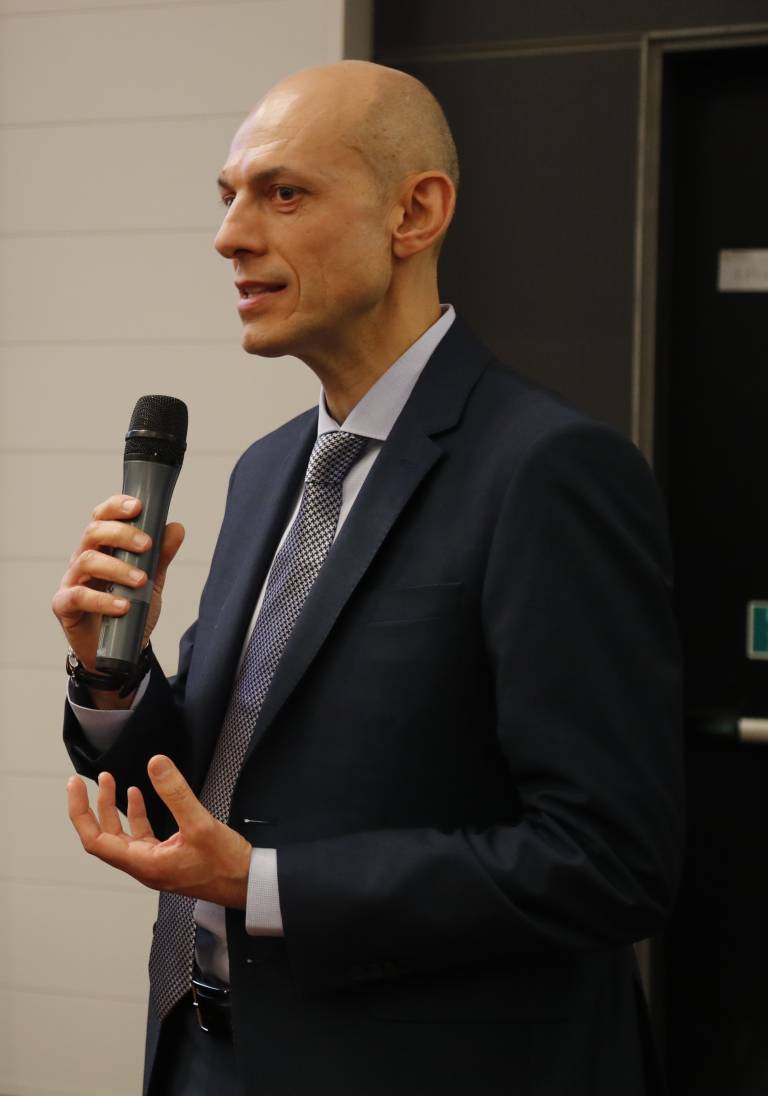
- Born: 16 May 1968 (age 58); Sassuolo, Italy
- Education: University of Bologna, Italy. M.S. in Political Sciences(1993)
- Occupations: Head of HR Motorsports and Special Projects in Red Bull (2025-Present) Chief People Officer in Racing Bulls (2024-2025); HR & Legal Director in Scuderia AlphaTauri (2020-2023); HR & Legal Director in Toro Rosso (2010-2019) HR Manager in Ferrari and Maserati (2002-2008)

Otello Valenti is the Head of HR Motorsports and Special Projects in Red Bull.

== Education ==
Valenti holds an M.S. in Political Sciences from the University of Bologna and he has developed work experiences in different European countries, in the US and in China.

He has more than 20 years of professional experience on mass consumer products, automotive, motorsport and retail and has held senior level positions at Electrolux, Ferrari, Maserati, Snap-on and Red Bull.

During his career he has done many university lectures on business and sport related topics including organization development, communication, team building and team performance.

== Career ==
=== Years as Electrolux manager ===
In 1992 he spent his last University year as a researcher in Electrolux focusing on the organizational changes connected with lean production and on the improvement of team performance. Just after graduation, in October 1993 he joined Electrolux working for the white hold appliances European Division and managing projects on organization changes, lean production, team building and team performance improvement.

=== Years as Ferrari executive ===
In 2002, he joined the Ferrari – Maserati Group as HR Manager for the Ferrari F1 Team and as Head of HR for the Maserati Racing Team. During this time, Ferrari F1 Team won three Driver World Championships and Three Constructor Championships in a row (2002–2004). At the same time Maserati Racing Team was built from green field in 18 month time securing the victory of the FIA GT Manufacturer Cup in the 2005 GT World Championship, followed by a Driver and Team Championship in 2006, by a Driver, Team and Manufacturer Cup in 2007 and again by a Driver and Team Championship in 2008 and 2009. Otello Valenti played a key role in the Maserati Project guaranteeing the recruiting of talented people fit for the challenge and developing an effective and flexible organization in a very short timeframe.

In 2005, he moved to the Ferrari GT Division as HR Manager for the Technical Direction and Operation Direction, contributing to develop a new organization for both areas more fit with the company targets.

During his period with Ferrari GT, the Company moved to a higher level of performance achieving its best results in economic terms and in terms of organization performance.

=== Years as Snap-on Equipment Europe executive ===
In November 2008, Valenti joined Snap-on Equipment Europe as HR Director Europe with the mission of integrating the different companies that were bought by the US based multinational, supporting the development of a common culture, improving the performance, streamlining the organization while hiring and developing talents.

=== Years as Red Bull executive ===
In June 2010 he joined Red Bull as HR & Legal Director for Scuderia Toro Rosso, supporting the team development from a race team to a fully-fledged constructor. Since his arrival in STR, he has contributed to the team development working on the organization of the team and the quality of the team members, managing an important staffing process, introducing a performance development approach, recruiting several key-people and developing the young talents within the team.

In 2012 has contributed to bring James Key and Steve Nielsen in Toro Rosso.

In 2013 and 2014 he has played a key role on Toro Rosso side for the development of the Red Bull on Stage project.

== Communication work ==
Thanks to his business experience within the industry, Valenti has given conferences and lectures and written articles and books about management, communication, team building and team performance.

In 1995, together with Professor Enrico Mascilli Migliorini and Professor Lella Mazzoli, he published the book "Le voci di dentro"(Voices from inside) which talks about new ways of organizing teams and companies with focus on communication processes and leadership method aimed at improving team performance.

In 1996 he published the essay "La sostenibile leggerezza delle reti. Cambiamento strutturale e cambiamento culturale nelle organizzazioni complesse" (The Sustainable Lightness of the Networks. Structural Change and Cultural Change in Complex Organizations) which talks about the approach to change management in complex organizations and how to lead it to success.
