= Rob Cherry =

British engineer

- Occupation: Mechanic
- Employer: Alpine F1 Team
- Title: Team Manager

Rob Cherry is a British Formula One mechanic and motorsports executive. He is currently the Race Team Manager at the Alpine F1 Team.

== Career ==
Cherry began his motorsport career in 2004, working as a mechanic for Arden International.He moved into Formula One in 2006, joining the Enstone-based Renault F1 Team as a rear-end mechanic on the test team. During Renault's factory era, Cherry progressed within the test operation and by 2008 had become the number one mechanic, taking responsibility for overseeing car preparation and trackside reliability at test events. When the team was rebranded as the Lotus F1 Team, Cherry transitioned to the race team, continuing in a senior mechanic capacity and working across both cars during a period in which the Enstone outfit returned to regular podium contention. His role focused on rear-end assembly, gearbox and suspension installation, and operational support at Grands Prix.

Following Renault's reacquisition of the team and its return as the works Renault Sport Formula One Team, Cherry was appointed Chief Mechanic in 2016. In this position he led the race mechanics group, coordinating car build, garage operations, and trackside procedures while helping guide the team through its infrastructure rebuild. He retained this leadership role when the team was rebranded as the Alpine F1 Team in 2021. In 2023, Cherry was promoted to Race Team Manager, assuming broader responsibility for trackside operations, logistics, and the integration of mechanics, garage functions, and car preparation across race weekends.
