= Alec Scheiner =

American businessman (born 1973)

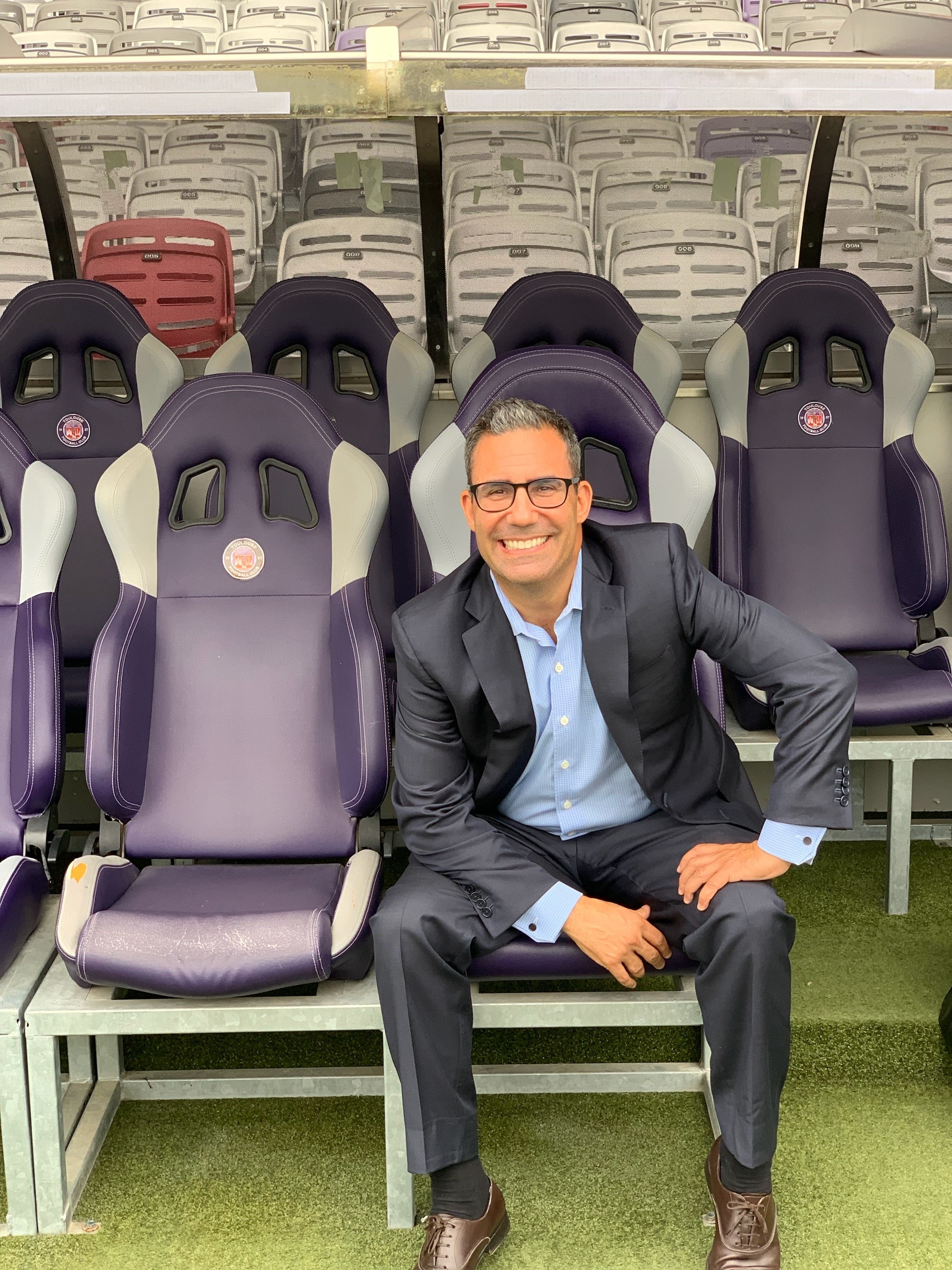
- Scheiner
- Born: Alec Scheiner; 1973 (age 52–53); Lower Merion, Pennsylvania, U.S.
- Occupations: Attorney private equity investor
- Website: Otro Capital

Alec Scheiner (born 1973) is a partner and co-founder of Otro Capital, a private equity firm that invests in sports, media and entertainment. Scheiner was previously a partner at RedBird Capital Partners, helping lead its sports practice. Alec has also served as president of the Cleveland Browns and senior vice president of the Dallas Cowboys.

== Early life ==
Scheiner was born and grew up in Lower Merion, Pennsylvania. After graduating high school in 1988, he attended Georgetown University, graduating with degrees in economics and Latin American studies in 1992. He then attended the Georgetown University Law Center, where he graduated with a J.D. degree in 1997.

== Law career ==
After law school, Scheiner became a lawyer, working at the law firm of Wilmer, Cutler, and Pickering (now WilmerHale), where he practiced from 1997 to 2004.

== NFL career ==
In 2004, Scheiner was hired by the NFL's Dallas Cowboys to be their general counsel. Four years later, he was promoted to vice president, where he was a key player in the day-to-day business operations of the team, as well as a point man for the building of the new Cowboys Stadium (now AT&T Stadium). In 2010, Scheiner was named to Sports Business Journal's "40 Under 40" list of top young sports executives.

On December 18, 2012, Scheiner left the Cowboys to become president of the Cleveland Browns, where he is in charge of all business operations for the team.

On March 4, 2016 Scheiner announced that he would be leaving his role as team president effective March 31. He will stay on with the Browns as a consultant for the remainder of the year.

== Private Equity ==
In 2016, Scheiner left the Cleveland Browns and joined RedBird Capital Partners. He has helped lead sports investments in OneTeam Partners (a partnership with the NFLPA and MLBPA) and Toulouse FC (and sits on the boards of each) and is the CEO of RedBall Acquisition Corp, a Special Purpose Acquisition Company with Billy Beane and Gerry Cardinale serving as co-chairman. Scheiner also helped lead RedBird's $750M investment in Fenway Sports Group.

In 2018, Scheiner partnered with four executives at RedBird Capital Partners to launch Otro Capital, a private equity company investing in sports, media and entertainment. The company has made investments in the Alpine F1 racing team and partnered with athletes and celebrities including Patrick Mahomes and Ryan Reynolds.

In December 2025, Scheiner led Otro to become the first private equity firm to invest directly into college sports, with a proposed investment into the athletic department at the University of Utah.

== Personal ==
Scheiner has three children from a previous relationship. In 2024, Alec married Sara Goodman, who has a daughter from a previous relationship.
