= Dave Redding (Formula One) =

British automotive engineer (born 1965)

- Born: 13 July 1965 (age 61)
- Occupations: automotive engineer and race car team manager
- Known for: Formula One Williams team manager

Dave Redding (born 13 July 1965) is a British automotive engineer who is currently the team manager of the Williams Formula 1 team. Prior to his transfer to the Grove team, he worked for McLaren's Formula 1 team, as team director.

== Career ==
Redding began his motorsport career in 1988, joining the Benetton team as a junior mechanic before progressing to a more senior role as number-one mechanic to Martin Brundle and Nelson Piquet. He moved to McLaren for 1995 in the same position and then left the team to assist in the formation of the fledging Stewart Grand Prix team as chief mechanic.

In 2000, Redding decided to return to McLaren, this time as part of the engineering department. He began as a systems engineer, before becoming assistant race engineer, then third car engineer, and then team manager after Dave Ryan was sacked in April 2009. He remained in this position during a relatively successful period for the team in which they won numerous races before slowly slipping down the standing from 2013 onwards.

In June 2017 Redding, seeking a new challenge, moved to Williams in an identical position replacing the F1 management bound Steve Nielsen. In his current role as team manager he manages relations with the FIA as well leading garage and logistical operations.
