= Joe Burnell (engineer) =

British engineer

- Education: University of Warwick
- Occupation: Engineer
- Title: Technical Director - Engineering

Joe Burnell is a British Formula One engineer. He is the Technical Director, Engineering at the Alpine F1 Team.

== Career ==
Burnell studied mechanical engineering at the University of Warwick, graduating with a Master of Engineering (MEng) degree in 2005. He began his career in industry with Meech Static Eliminators, working as a product manager before moving into the automotive sector with Triumph Motorcycles, where he served as a design engineer and later project engineer, contributing to mechanical design and product development programmes.

In 2010 Burnell joined Mercedes AMG High Performance Powertrains in Brixworth as a mechanical design engineer, working on the integration and packaging of hybrid power unit systems during the early years of Formula One's V6 turbo-hybrid era. He progressed through a series of leadership roles within the mechanical engineering department, including team leader positions responsible for ERS mechanical systems, module integration, and overall power unit installation. In these roles he oversaw the design, validation, and operational support of complex hybrid systems during a period in which Mercedes established sustained competitive dominance in Formula One.

In 2021 Burnell moved to the Enstone-based Alpine F1 Team as Head of Powertrain Design, where he led the integration of the Renault power unit into the team's chassis architecture. He subsequently served as Chief Engineer for the Alpine A526 project before being appointed Technical Director (Engineering) in 2024, assuming broader responsibility for engineering delivery, cross-departmental integration, and car development execution.
