= Ciaron Pilbeam =

British engineer

- Citizenship: British
- Education: Automotive Engineering; Mathematics
- Alma mater: Cranfield University; Cambridge University
- Occupation: Engineer
- Years active: 1999-present
- Employer: Alpine F1 Team
- Known for: Formula One engineer
- Title: Technical Director, Performance
- Parent: Mike Pilbeam (father)

Ciaron Pilbeam is a British Formula One engineer. He is currently the Technical Director, Performance at the Alpine Formula One team.

== Career ==
Pilbeam first started at British American Racing working in Vehicle Dynamics. A year later, he worked closely with Jock Clear as Assistant Race Engineer to 1997 Formula 1 world champion Jacques Villeneuve. Pilbeam continued working with BAR as Race Engineer to Takuma Sato before moving to Red Bull Racing in 2006 with Christian Klien. In 2007, Pilbeam took on the role as Mark Webber's Race Engineer, keeping that position for six years. He assisted nine race wins for the Australian and contributed to three constructor world championship titles. Pilbeam gained headlines after Webber and Vettel's crash at the 2010 Turkish Grand Prix, with media speculation that Pilbeam ignored a direct team order from Christian Horner to advise Webber to move aside for the German.

Ahead of the 2013 F1 Season, Pilbeam joined Lotus F1 Team as Chief Race Engineer to Kimi Räikkönen, with Räikkönen's former engineer Simon Rennie heading to Red Bull Racing. Pilbeam was with Räikkönen for just one season, but stewarded his win at the Australian Grand Prix, which would be the last win for the 2007 World Champion until 2018. Pilbeam moved to McLaren the following year in an identical role. After being with McLaren from 2014 to the end of the 2016 season, Pilbeam returned to Enstone under the renewed Renault F1 Team as Chief Race Engineer alongside Rob White joining as COO. In 2021, Pilbeam was reunited with Fernando Alonso at Renault with the pair having worked together at McLaren. Early in 2024, Pilbeam was appointed one of three main technical director's for Alpine, after Matt Harman and Dirk de Beer resigned and Bob Bell joined Aston Martin.

== Personal life ==
Pilbeam's father is Mike Pilbeam who designed racing cars for multiple manufacturers including BRM, Lotus and Surtees. Pilbeam contributes as a tutor to students at the MIA School of Race Engineering. Pilbeam cited his first test with BAR at Silverstone as the moment he became hooked on Formula One.
