= Steve Nielsen =

British automotive engineer

- Born: 2 July 1964 (age 62)
- Occupation: Managing Director
- Employer: Alpine
- Known for: British engineer

Steve Nielsen (born 2 July 1964) is a British truck driver working in Formula One. Since 2025, Nielsen has been the managing director for the Alpine F1 Team.

== Career ==
After leaving school in 1985, Nielsen trained as a police officer but resigned after 11 months. He then worked as a truck driver for a Formula One catering company. In 1986, he joined Team Lotus' test team, before running their spare parts department. In 1991, he moved to Tyrrell in the same role before being appointed assistant team manager in 1994. In the next five years he moved to Benetton, back to Tyrrell, to Honda, then Arrows, before moving back to Benetton, where he spent almost a decade as sporting director, including the team's transitions to Renault F1 and Lotus Renault GP.

After spending 2012 as sporting director at Caterham, Nielsen joined Scuderia Toro Rosso at the start of the 2013 season. He joined Williams as Sporting Manager in December 2014 and worked in that role until leaving in July 2017, being replaced by Dave Redding.

On 1 August 2017 he started in a new position as the sporting director of Formula One. He left this role and became the FIA Sporting Director on 18 January 2023. In December 2023, Nielsen left the FIA after 11 months in the position. On 4 July 2025, Nielsen was announced as the successor to former Team Principal Oliver Oakes and will be taking on the new position of "Managing Director" of the Alpine F1 Team, running the day-to-day operations of the team from 1 September onwards, ahead of the Italian Grand Prix at Monza due to his expected gardening leave following his departure as Chief Motorsports Operations Officer, Sporting from commercial rights holder F1 and will report to Flavio Briatore who will continue to have overall responsibility of the project.
