= 2025 Miami Grand Prix =

Formula One motor race

Race 6 of 24 in the 2025 Formula One World Championship
← Previous race	Next race →
- Layout of the Miami International Autodrome

Race details
- Date: May 4, 2025
- Official name: Formula 1 Crypto.com Miami Grand Prix 2025
- Location: Miami International Autodrome, Miami Gardens, Florida, US
- Course: Purpose-built temporary circuit
- Course length: 5.412 km (3.363 miles)
- Distance: 57 laps, 308.326 km (191.584 miles)
- Weather: Cloudy
- Attendance: 275,000

Pole position
Driver	(Netherlands) Max Verstappen	Red Bull Racing-Honda RBPT
- Time: 1:26.204

Fastest lap
Driver	(United Kingdom) Lando Norris	McLaren-Mercedes
- Time: 1:29.746 on lap 36

Podium
First	(Australia) Oscar Piastri	McLaren-Mercedes
Second	(United Kingdom) Lando Norris	McLaren-Mercedes
Third	(United Kingdom) George Russell	Mercedes

The 2025 Miami Grand Prix (officially known as the Formula 1 Crypto.com Miami Grand Prix 2025) was a Formula One motor race that was held on May 4, 2025, at the Miami International Autodrome in Miami Gardens, Florida, United States. It was the sixth round of the 2025 Formula One World Championship and the second of six Grands Prix in the season to utilise the sprint format.

Kimi Antonelli of Mercedes took sprint pole position for the event. Lando Norris of McLaren won the sprint ahead of his teammate Oscar Piastri and Lewis Hamilton of Ferrari. Verstappen took pole for the Grand Prix. Piastri won the Grand Prix ahead of Norris and Antonelli's teammate George Russell. This would be the final race in F1 for Alpine driver Jack Doohan, as he would be replaced by the team's reserve driver Franco Colapinto before the following Emilia Romagna Grand Prix.

Piastri's third consecutive Grand Prix victory increased his points total to 131, extending his lead over Norris to 16 points. Max Verstappen remained in third with 99 points, six points ahead of Russell in fourth. The top five in the Constructors' Standings remained unchanged, but McLaren extended their lead over Mercedes to 105 points.

== Background ==
The event was held at the Miami International Autodrome in Miami Gardens, Florida, for the fourth time in the circuit's history, across the weekend of May 2–4. The Grand Prix was the sixth round of the 2025 Formula One World Championship and the fourth running of the Miami Grand Prix. It was also the second of six Grands Prix in the season to utilise the sprint format and the second time overall that the Miami Grand Prix featured it.

=== Championship standings before the race ===
Going into the event, Oscar Piastri led the Drivers' Championship with 99 points, ten points ahead of his teammate Lando Norris in second, and twelve ahead of Max Verstappen in third. McLaren, with 188 points, entered the race as the leader in the Constructors' Championship from Mercedes in second with 111 points, and Red Bull Racing third with 89 points.

=== Entrants ===
The drivers and teams were the same as published in the season entry list with one exception. Yuki Tsunoda at Red Bull Racing was in the seat originally held by Liam Lawson before the latter was demoted back to Racing Bulls from the Japanese Grand Prix onward. This race marked Jack Doohan's last for Alpine before a decision to rotate the seat, with Franco Colapinto taking the seat from the following Emilia Romagna Grand Prix.

=== Tyre choices ===
Tyre supplier Pirelli brought the C3, C4, and C5 tyre compounds (designated hard, medium, and soft, respectively) for teams to use at the event.

== Practice ==
The sole free practice session was held on May 2, 2025, at 12:30 local time (UTC–4), and was topped by Oscar Piastri of McLaren ahead of Charles Leclerc of Ferrari and Max Verstappen of Red Bull Racing. The session was red-flagged in the closing stages as Oliver Bearman of Haas hit the wall at turn 12.

== Sprint qualifying ==
Sprint qualifying was held on May 2, 2025, at 16:30 local time (UTC–4), and determined the starting grid order for the sprint.

=== Sprint qualifying classification ===
Pos.	No.	Driver	Constructor	Qualifying times			Sprint grid
Pos.	No.	Driver	Constructor	SQ1	SQ2	SQ3	Sprint grid
1	12	(Italy) Kimi Antonelli	Mercedes	1:27.858	1:27.384	1:26.482	1
2	81	(Australia) Oscar Piastri	McLaren-Mercedes	1:27.951	1:27.354	1:26.527	2
3	4	(United Kingdom) Lando Norris	McLaren-Mercedes	1:27.890	1:27.109	1:26.582	3
4	1	(Netherlands) Max Verstappen	Red Bull Racing-Honda RBPT	1:27.953	1:27.245	1:26.737	4
5	63	(United Kingdom) George Russell	Mercedes	1:27.688	1:27.666	1:26.791	5
6	16	(Monaco) Charles Leclerc	Ferrari	1:28.325	1:27.467	1:26.808	6
7	44	(United Kingdom) Lewis Hamilton	Ferrari	1:28.231	1:27.546	1:27.030	7
8	23	(Thailand) Alexander Albon	Williams-Mercedes	1:27.859	1:27.697	1:27.193	8
9	6	(France) Isack Hadjar	Racing Bulls-Honda RBPT	1:28.394	1:27.773	1:27.543	9
10	14	(Spain) Fernando Alonso	Aston Martin Aramco-Mercedes	1:28.455	1:27.766	1:27.790	10
11	27	(Germany) Nico Hülkenberg	Kick Sauber-Ferrari	1:28.542	1:27.850	N/A	11
12	31	(France) Esteban Ocon	Haas-Ferrari	1:28.303	1:28.070	N/A	12
13	10	(France) Pierre Gasly	Alpine-Renault	1:28.345	1:28.167	N/A	13
14	30	(New Zealand) Liam Lawson	Racing Bulls-Honda RBPT	1:28.914	1:28.375	N/A	14
15	55	(Spain) Carlos Sainz Jr.	Williams-Mercedes	1:27.899	No time	N/A	15
16	18	(Canada) Lance Stroll	Aston Martin Aramco-Mercedes	1:29.028	N/A	N/A	16
17	7	(Australia) Jack Doohan	Alpine-Renault	1:29.171	N/A	N/A	17
18	22	(Japan) Yuki Tsunoda	Red Bull Racing-Honda RBPT	1:29.246	N/A	N/A	PL^{1}
19	5	(Brazil) Gabriel Bortoleto	Kick Sauber-Ferrari	1:29.312	N/A	N/A	18
20	87	(United Kingdom) Oliver Bearman	Haas-Ferrari	1:29.825	N/A	N/A	19
107% time: 1:33.826

Notes

- ^1 – Yuki Tsunoda qualified 18th, but was required to start the sprint from the pit lane as his car was modified under parc fermé conditions.

== Sprint ==
The sprint was held on May 3, 2025, and was scheduled to start at 12:00 local time (UTC–4), but was delayed to 12:28 as there were two formation laps behind the safety car, before the start was suspended due to rain. The sprint was set to be run for 19 laps, but was shortened by one lap due to the aborted start procedure.

=== Sprint report ===
Prior to the sprint, and in torrential rain, Charles Leclerc crashed his Ferrari after aquaplaning at turn 10. He did not start the sprint, and his grid slot was left empty. The sprint began in intermediate conditions. Oscar Piastri of McLaren challenged sprint polesitter Kimi Antonelli of Mercedes into the first corner, causing Antonelli to run wide and drop to 4th position behind Piastri's teammate Lando Norris and Max Verstappen of Red Bull Racing. On lap 11 Lewis Hamilton of Ferrari, who had been running in 6th, became the first of the leading drivers to switch to slick tyres. He was followed in the following lap by Verstappen and Antonelli. During Verstappen's pitstop he was released prematurely and hit Antonelli, who as a result could not enter his pit box and had to spend another lap on intermediate tyres that were becoming increasingly unfit for the conditions. The same lap Carlos Sainz Jr. of Williams, who had already switched to slicks, hit the wall on the inside of turn 14. He drove back to the pits, but was forced to retire.

On lap 13, race leader Piastri, who was now being closely pursued by Norris and had endured a brief off at the turns 14/15 chicane, switched to slicks and rejoined the race in 2nd. On lap 14 Hamilton overtook Verstappen into turn 11, the pair now up to 3rd and 4th as a result of their early switch to slick tyres. Norris, now the only driver not on slicks, pitted at the end of the lap. As Norris was making his stop the Safety Car was deployed due to an incident between Fernando Alonso of Aston Martin and Liam Lawson of Racing Bulls. While disputing 8th place, Lawson had been forced off the track at turn 11 before clipping the right-rear wheel of Alonso whilst attempting to rejoin the circuit, causing Alonso to spin into the turn 12 barrier destroying the front wing and the right-rear side of his car. The safety car deployment allowed Norris to exit the pitlane still in the lead of the race and, with there not being enough laps left to return to green flag running, take the sprint victory.

Piastri finished 2nd ahead of Hamilton, while Verstappen finished 4th. He received a ten-second time penalty for the unsafe release involving Antonelli, dropping him to 17th and marking his first finish outside the points in any race format since the 2016 Belgian Grand Prix. Initially this promoted Oliver Bearman of Haas into the final points-paying position of 8th, however he was given a penalty for an unsafe release. Meanwhile, penalties given to Lawson for his collision with Alonso, Alexander Albon of Williams for a Safety Car infringement. These penalties promoted Verstappen's teammate Yuki Tsunoda - who had started from the pit lane but gained an advantage from being the first driver to switch to slicks - Antonelli and Pierre Gasly of Alpine to the points.

=== Sprint classification ===
Pos.	No.	Driver	Constructor	Laps	Time/Retired	Grid	Points
1	4	(United Kingdom) Lando Norris	McLaren-Mercedes	18	36:37.647	3	8
2	81	(Australia) Oscar Piastri	McLaren-Mercedes	18	+0.672	2	7
3	44	(United Kingdom) Lewis Hamilton	Ferrari	18	+1.073	7	6
4	63	(United Kingdom) George Russell	Mercedes	18	+3.127	5	5
5	18	(Canada) Lance Stroll	Aston Martin Aramco-Mercedes	18	+3.412	16	4
6	22	(Japan) Yuki Tsunoda	Red Bull Racing-Honda RBPT	18	+5.153	PL	3
7	12	(Italy) Kimi Antonelli	Mercedes	18	+5.635	1	2
8	10	(France) Pierre Gasly	Alpine-Renault	18	+5.973	13	1
9	27	(Germany) Nico Hülkenberg	Kick Sauber-Ferrari	18	+6.153	11	
10	6	(France) Isack Hadjar	Racing Bulls-Honda RBPT	18	+7.502	9	
11	23	(Thailand) Alexander Albon	Williams-Mercedes	18	+7.522^{1}	8	
12	31	(France) Esteban Ocon	Haas-Ferrari	18	+8.998	12	
13	30	(New Zealand) Liam Lawson	Racing Bulls-Honda RBPT	18	+9.024^{2}	14	
14	87	(United Kingdom) Oliver Bearman	Haas-Ferrari	18	+9.218^{3}	19	
15	5	(Brazil) Gabriel Bortoleto	Kick Sauber-Ferrari	18	+9.675	18	
16	7	(Australia) Jack Doohan	Alpine-Renault	18	+9.909	17	
17	1	(Netherlands) Max Verstappen	Red Bull Racing-Honda RBPT	18	+12.059^{4}	4	
Ret	14	(Spain) Fernando Alonso	Aston Martin Aramco-Mercedes	13	Collision	10	
Ret	55	(Spain) Carlos Sainz Jr.	Williams-Mercedes	12	Puncture	15	
DNS^{5}	16	(Monaco) Charles Leclerc	Ferrari	0	Accident	—^{5}	

Notes

- ^1 – Alexander Albon finished fifth and would have moved up to fourth with Max Verstappen's penalty, but received a five-second time penalty for a safety car infringement.
- ^2 – Liam Lawson finished eighth, but received a five-second time penalty for causing a collision with Fernando Alonso.
- ^3 – Oliver Bearman finished ninth, but received a five-second time penalty for an unsafe release.
- ^4 – Max Verstappen finished fourth, but received a ten-second time penalty for an unsafe release.
- ^5 – Charles Leclerc did not start the sprint as he crashed during a reconnaissance lap. His place on the grid was left vacant. His result was officially listed as "DNF" instead of "DNS" in the sprint final classification published by the FIA.

== Qualifying ==
Qualifying was held on May 3, 2025, and was scheduled to start at 16:00 local time (UTC–4), but was delayed to 16:15 due to a change to the schedule under the supplementary regulation following the starting delay of the sprint. The session determined the starting grid order for the main race.

=== Qualifying classification ===
Pos.	No.	Driver	Constructor	Qualifying times			Final grid
Pos.	No.	Driver	Constructor	Q1	Q2	Q3	Final grid
1	1	(Netherlands) Max Verstappen	Red Bull Racing-Honda RBPT	1:26.870	1:26.643	1:26.204	1
2	4	(United Kingdom) Lando Norris	McLaren-Mercedes	1:26.955	1:26.499	1:26.269	2
3	12	(Italy) Kimi Antonelli	Mercedes	1:27.077	1:26.606	1:26.271	3
4	81	(Australia) Oscar Piastri	McLaren-Mercedes	1:27.006	1:26.269	1:26.375	4
5	63	(United Kingdom) George Russell	Mercedes	1:27.014	1:26.575	1:26.385	5
6	55	(Spain) Carlos Sainz Jr.	Williams-Mercedes	1:27.098	1:26.847	1:26.569	6
7	23	(Thailand) Alexander Albon	Williams-Mercedes	1:27.042	1:26.855	1:26.682	7
8	16	(Monaco) Charles Leclerc	Ferrari	1:27.417	1:26.948	1:26.754	8
9	31	(France) Esteban Ocon	Haas-Ferrari	1:27.450	1:26.967	1:26.824	9
10	22	(Japan) Yuki Tsunoda	Red Bull Racing-Honda RBPT	1:27.298	1:26.959	1:26.943	10
11	6	(France) Isack Hadjar	Racing Bulls-Honda RBPT	1:27.301	1:26.987	N/A	11
12	44	(United Kingdom) Lewis Hamilton	Ferrari	1:27.279	1:27.006	N/A	12
13	5	(Brazil) Gabriel Bortoleto	Kick Sauber-Ferrari	1:27.343	1:27.151	N/A	13
14	7	(Australia) Jack Doohan	Alpine-Renault	1:27.422	1:27.186	N/A	14
15	30	(New Zealand) Liam Lawson	Racing Bulls-Honda RBPT	1:27.444	1:27.363	N/A	15
16	27	(Germany) Nico Hülkenberg	Kick Sauber-Ferrari	1:27.473	N/A	N/A	16
17	14	(Spain) Fernando Alonso	Aston Martin Aramco-Mercedes	1:27.604	N/A	N/A	17
18	10	(France) Pierre Gasly	Alpine-Renault	1:27.710	N/A	N/A	PL^{1}
19	18	(Canada) Lance Stroll	Aston Martin Aramco-Mercedes	1:27.830	N/A	N/A	18
20	87	(United Kingdom) Oliver Bearman	Haas-Ferrari	1:27.999	N/A	N/A	19
107% time: 1:32.950

Notes

- ^1 – Pierre Gasly qualified 18th, but was required to start the race from the pit lane as his car was modified under parc fermé conditions.

== Race ==
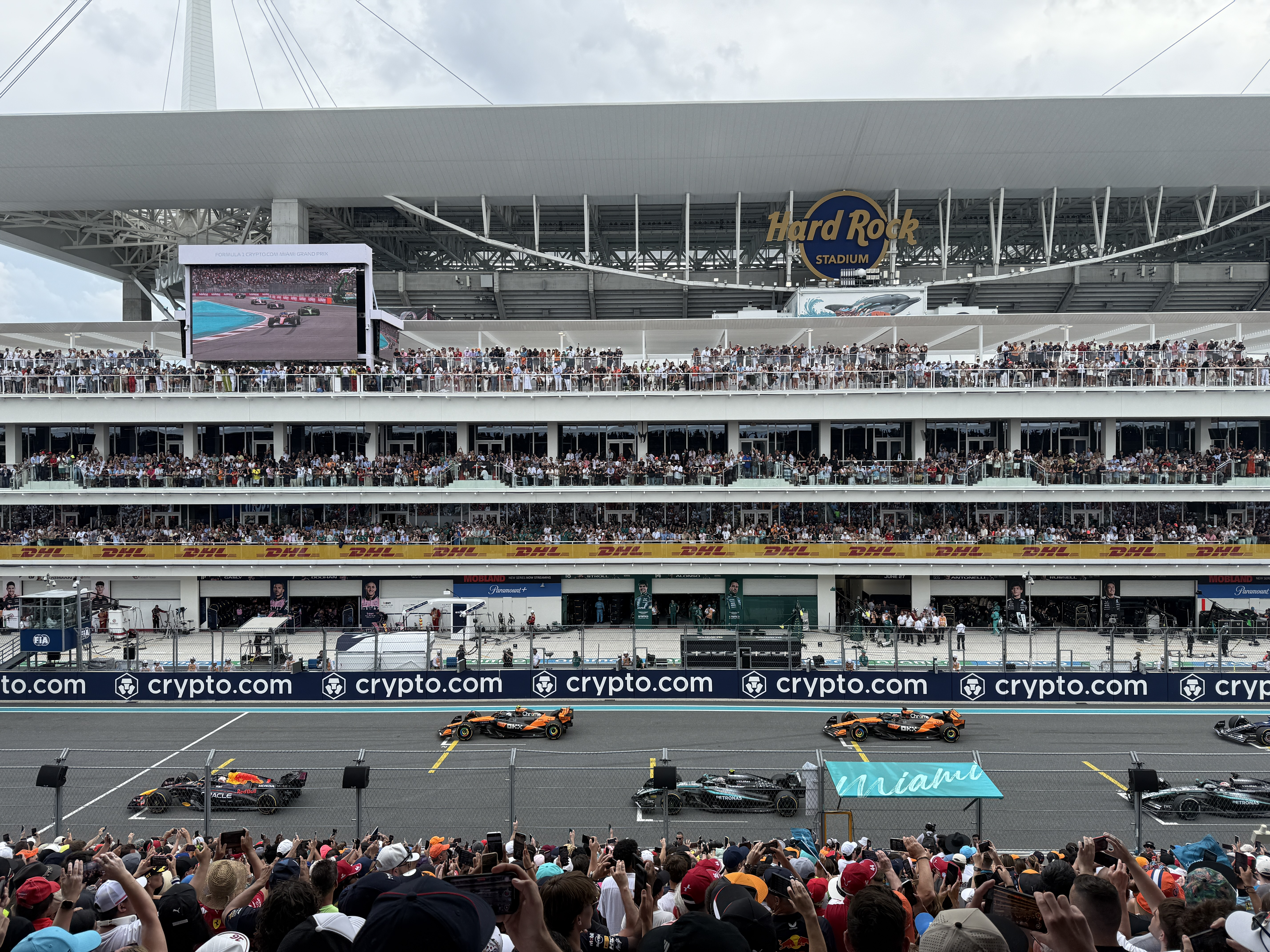
The first three rows of the grid ahead of the race start.

The race was held on May 4, 2025, at 16:00 local time (UTC–4), and was run for 57 laps.

=== Race report ===
From pole position, Max Verstappen of Red Bull Racing initially appeared to cover off Lando Norris of McLaren (who started from 2nd place) at the start, but then locked up into the turn 1 right-hander. This allowed Norris to pull alongside on the exit of the corner, putting himself on Verstappen's outside for turn 2. As the pair entered the fast left-hander, Verstappen appeared to briefly suffer from oversteer which caused his car to "snap" towards the outside of the corner, forcing Norris to run off the track in evasive action. The resulting loss of speed caused Norris to drop to 6th position behind Kimi Antonelli of Mercedes, Norris's teammate Oscar Piastri, Antonelli's teammate George Russell, and Alexander Albon of Williams. Albon was himself fortunate to avoid seriously colliding with his teammate Carlos Sainz Jr., as the pair swerved to avoid the re-joining Norris. Norris complained about Verstappen's driving over his team radio, however the race stewards decided to take no action after investigating the incident.

Further down the order, Jack Doohan of Alpine (who had started 14th) attempted to gain positions by braking late into turn 1, however in the process made contact with Liam Lawson of Racing Bulls. Lawson spun around following the collision, whilst Doohan suffered serious damage to the front-left of his car and would pull off the track further round the lap; Lawson would eventually also retire from the race due to the damage sustained. To clear debris and allow Doohan's car to be recovered, the virtual safety car (VSC) was deployed. Following the return to green flag running, Piastri made quick work of Antonelli, passing the Mercedes driver on the run to turn 11 to take 2nd position on lap 4. As this was happening, Norris made a similar move on Albon to take 5th. On lap 7, Norris passed Russell for 4th position after making a move up the inside of turn 4. Norris passed Antonelli into turn 11 two laps later, moving himself back into the podium positions.

By now, Piastri had closed in on Verstappen. After applying pressure for multiple laps, he achieved a successful pass by challenging Verstappen on the outside of the braking zone for the turn 17 hairpin. Whilst Verstappen was able to fend off this initial attack, in doing so he compromised his exit onto the following start/finish straight, allowing Piastri to pull alongside as the pair began lap 14. Verstappen attempted to hold the lead by braking late into turn 1 but locked up and ran off the circuit, thus allowing Piastri to complete the pass. Verstappen now quickly came under attack from Norris. On lap 15, Norris attempted to pass Verstappen around the outside of turn 1. As Verstappen was ahead at the apex, he was entitled to take the racing line, and pushed Norris wide off of the circuit. On lap 17, Norris passed Verstappen down the inside to turn 11, in the process forcing both drivers off the track. As Norris had overtaken Verstappen off track, he conceded the position shortly after. The following lap, Norris successfully passed Verstappen at turn 11 to move himself back into 2nd position. However, significant damage had been done to his chances of victory, as Norris now found himself nearly 9 seconds behind Piastri, compared to a gap of less than 2 seconds when Piastri had first taken the lead.

On lap 28 Oliver Bearman of Haas, who had been running in 12th, suffered an engine failure as he drove through turn 4 which forced him to pull off the circuit. The virtual safety car was deployed whilst Bearman's car was moved behind the barriers and, as seen in the sprint, this benefitted drivers who had yet to pit. The highest placed of these drivers, George Russell in 3rd, took full advantage and left his pitstop still ahead of Verstappen (who had made his stop earlier in the race), maintaining his position in the process. On lap 31, following the VSC's withdrawal, Alexander Albon passed Antonelli through turn 1 to take 5th position. Moments later, Albon's teammate Sainz overtook Charles Leclerc of Ferrari (who had pitted under the VSC) at the same corner to take 7th. On lap 33, the VSC was briefly redeployed after Gabriel Bortoleto of Sauber stopped on the exit of turn 16. When this VSC ended, Leclerc was able to catch Sainz off guard and repass him into turn 1 at the start of lap 34. Leclerc's teammate Lewis Hamilton was able to also pass Sainz, putting himself to 8th position. With the Ferraris now running together in 7th and 8th, a debate began on the pit wall and over team radio regarding which driver was better placed to attack 6th-placed Antonelli. On lap 38, team orders were applied to allow Hamilton in front with the hope he would be able to move up the field. However, Hamilton could not make progress, and therefore Leclerc was let back through on lap 52. Shortly afterward, Hamilton encountered Carlos Sainz Jr. of Williams. Piastri won the race from teammate Norris and Russell. Sainz was involved in an incident with Hamilton, the two making contact as they went into turn 17; no further action was taken.

=== Race classification ===
Pos.	No.	Driver	Constructor	Laps	Time/Retired	Grid	Points
1	81	(Australia) Oscar Piastri	McLaren-Mercedes	57	1:28:51.587	4	25
2	4	(United Kingdom) Lando Norris	McLaren-Mercedes	57	+4.630	2	18
3	63	(United Kingdom) George Russell	Mercedes	57	+37.644	5	15
4	1	(Netherlands) Max Verstappen	Red Bull Racing-Honda RBPT	57	+39.956	1	12
5	23	(Thailand) Alexander Albon	Williams-Mercedes	57	+48.067	7	10
6	12	(Italy) Kimi Antonelli	Mercedes	57	+55.502	3	8
7	16	(Monaco) Charles Leclerc	Ferrari	57	+57.036	8	6
8	44	(United Kingdom) Lewis Hamilton	Ferrari	57	+1:00.186	12	4
9	55	(Spain) Carlos Sainz Jr.	Williams-Mercedes	57	+1:00.577	6	2
10	22	(Japan) Yuki Tsunoda	Red Bull Racing-Honda RBPT	57	+1:14.434^{1}	10	1
11	6	(France) Isack Hadjar	Racing Bulls-Honda RBPT	57	+1:14.602	11	
12	31	(France) Esteban Ocon	Haas-Ferrari	57	+1:22.006	9	
13	10	(France) Pierre Gasly	Alpine-Renault	57	+1:30.445	PL	
14	27	(Germany) Nico Hülkenberg	Kick Sauber-Ferrari	56	+1 lap	16	
15	14	(Spain) Fernando Alonso	Aston Martin Aramco-Mercedes	56	+1 lap	17	
16	18	(Canada) Lance Stroll	Aston Martin Aramco-Mercedes	56	+1 lap	18	
Ret	30	(New Zealand) Liam Lawson	Racing Bulls-Honda RBPT	36	Collision damage	15	
Ret	5	(Brazil) Gabriel Bortoleto	Kick Sauber-Ferrari	30	Fuel system	13	
Ret	87	(United Kingdom) Oliver Bearman	Haas-Ferrari	27	Engine	19	
Ret	7	(Australia) Jack Doohan	Alpine-Renault	0	Collision	14	

Notes

- ^1 – Yuki Tsunoda received a five-second time penalty for speeding in the pit lane. His final position was not affected by the penalty.

== Championship standings after the race ==
Drivers' Championship standings

Pos.	Driver	Points
1	(Australia) Oscar Piastri	131
2	(United Kingdom) Lando Norris	115
3	(Netherlands) Max Verstappen	99
4	(United Kingdom) George Russell	93
5	(Monaco) Charles Leclerc	53

Constructors' Championship standings

Pos.	Constructor	Points
1	(United Kingdom) McLaren-Mercedes	246
2	(Germany) Mercedes	141
3	(Austria) Red Bull Racing-Honda RBPT	105
4	(Italy) Ferrari	94
5	(United Kingdom) Williams-Mercedes	37

- Note: Only the top five positions are included for both sets of standings.

Previous race: 2025 Saudi Arabian Grand Prix	FIA Formula One World Championship; 2025 season	Next race: 2025 Emilia Romagna Grand Prix
Previous race: 2024 Miami Grand Prix	Miami Grand Prix	Next race: 2026 Miami Grand Prix
