= Team Enstone =

Colloquial name for a British Formula One team

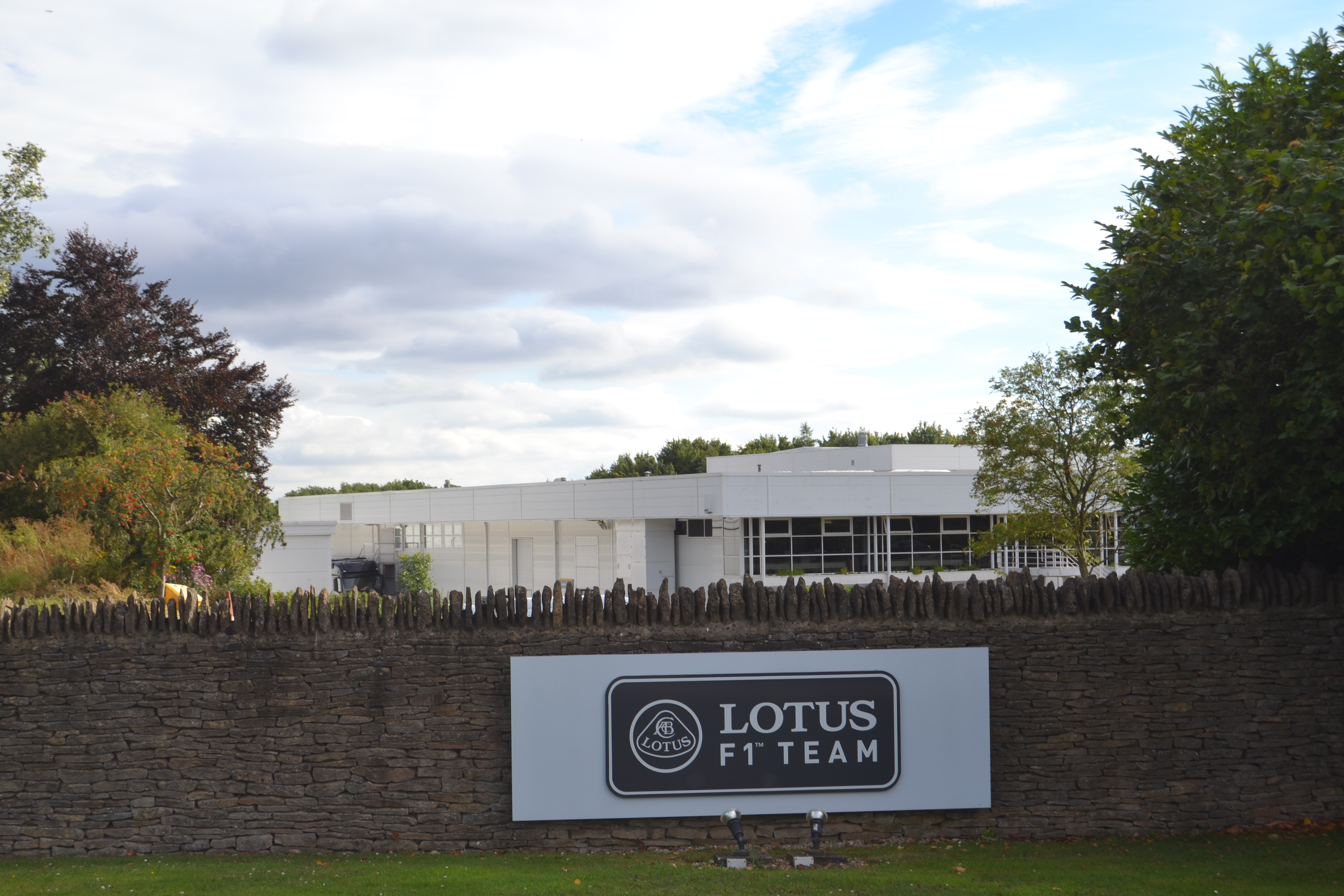
- Base: Whiteways Technical Centre; Enstone, Oxfordshire, OX7 4EE

Formula One World Championship career
- First entry: 1981 San Marino Grand Prix
- Constructors: Toleman, Benetton, Renault, Lotus, Alpine
- Constructors' Championships: 3 (1995 Benetton, 2005 Renault, 2006 Renault)
- Drivers' Championships: 4 (1994 Benetton, 1995 Benetton, 2005 Renault, 2006 Renault)

"Team Enstone" is the colloquial name for a Formula One team based in Enstone, Oxfordshire, which has won seven Formula One World Championships. Since 1981, the same team has competed under five identities—most notably Benetton Formula and Renault F1 Team—and three nationalities (British, Italian and French). It is currently owned by Renault and known as the Alpine F1 Team.

As of the 2026 São Paulo Grand Prix, forty-seven drivers have competed for the five constructors in the lineage in 819 Grands Prix, winning fifty of them. Notable drivers include World Champions Ayrton Senna, Nelson Piquet, Michael Schumacher, Jenson Button, Fernando Alonso, and Kimi Räikkönen. Schumacher and Alonso both won two Drivers' Championships with the team.

== Overview ==
=== Historical performance ===
Although Formula One organisations frequently change their names for branding or ownership reasons, Autosport called the Enstone team "particularly chameleonic". Due to its frequent changes of corporate identity, The Race said that "it's easiest simply to call it 'Team Enstone'"; even the official Formula One website does so on occasion. Sources differ on whether the current incarnation of Team Enstone can claim its predecessors' history. As of December 2024, the Formula One website states that Alpine F1 Team entered the sport in 1986 (the year Toleman rebranded to Benetton) and has won two Constructors' Championships and twenty-one races (i.e., the combined records of Enstone-era Renault and Alpine, but not including Benetton, Lotus, or pre-Enstone Renault).

The Enstone team has competed for podiums, wins, and titles in multiple eras, although it has also endured periods of mediocrity. From the 1980s to the mid-2000s, Team Enstone was considered one of the "Big Four" Formula One teams, along with Ferrari, McLaren, and Williams, which won every Constructors' Championship from 1984 to 2008. However, the team has struggled to reach its old heights since then; Brawn/Mercedes and Red Bull won every Constructors' Championship from 2009 to 2023. As of the 2026 São Paulo Grand Prix, forty-seven drivers have competed for the five constructors in the lineage in 819 Grands Prix, winning fifty of them.

=== Personnel continuity ===
Although many designers and drivers have come and gone over the years, the team is best known for its years under the leadership of Flavio Briatore (team principal 1991–97, 2000–09, 2025–present; (Note: De facto team principal starting in 2025.) advisor 2024–present) and Pat Symonds (engineer and/or technical director 1979–90, 1992–2009), during which it won all seven of its Formula One championships.

Following double world champion Michael Schumacher's 1996 move to Ferrari, several senior Enstone personnel, including Rory Byrne and Ross Brawn, joined Schumacher in Maranello, and the Enstone team temporarily returned to "mere contender territory." Nonetheless, the team continued to employ "a number of 'lifers' who date back to the Benetton days," including Briatore, Symonds, and sporting director Alan Permane, the last of whom stepped down in 2023. In addition, the team rehired Briatore as an advisor in June 2024.

In the 2020s, several ex-Enstone personnel joined the Cadillac Formula One project, although some of them (including Symonds) had already been working for other organisations for several years at that point.

== Corporate history ==
=== Toleman (1981–85) ===
The original constructor in the lineage was Toleman, which competed in other categories of motor racing during the 1970s. Toleman initially operated out of a workshop in Kidlington, but moved to Witney ahead of the 1980 Formula Two season and entered Formula One in 1981. Toleman incorporated in April 1984 as Inremco 60 Ltd, but changed its corporate name to Benetton Formula Ltd in July 1985. Since 1984, all incarnations of Team Enstone have retained the same corporate registration.

Under team principal Alex Hawkridge, Toleman sought to distinguish itself from other small teams by obtaining a works-team supply of turbocharger engines from Hart. However, the team alienated its tyre supplier Pirelli after abruptly switching to Michelin tyres in 1984. After Michelin pulled out of Formula One, the team smoothed relations with the Italian Pirelli by hiring a new team principal and signing Italian fashion brand United Colors of Benetton as its lead sponsor.

From 1981 to 1985, Toleman entered seventy races and recorded three podiums, all of which were earned by Ayrton Senna.

=== Benetton (1986–2001) ===
In 1985, Benetton, Toleman's primary sponsor, bought the team from Hawkridge for £2 million. The fashion label branded itself as anti-establishment and was reportedly attracted to Toleman's outsider image. Due to FOCA rules, the team spent one final year as Toleman, but in January 1986, Benetton Group formally rebranded the team to Benetton Formula Ltd ahead of the 1986 season.

The switch from Toleman to Benetton set a long-running precedent: under Formula One rules Toleman and Benetton were two different constructors, but under UK corporate law Benetton was the same organisation as Toleman, and the same key staffers remained at Benetton after the change, including the design team led by Rory Byrne. Toleman wanted to find a buyer who would keep the staff together, and Benetton wanted to see what Byrne could do with a larger budget. Benetton kept Toleman's British licence until 1996, when it switched to an Italian licence.

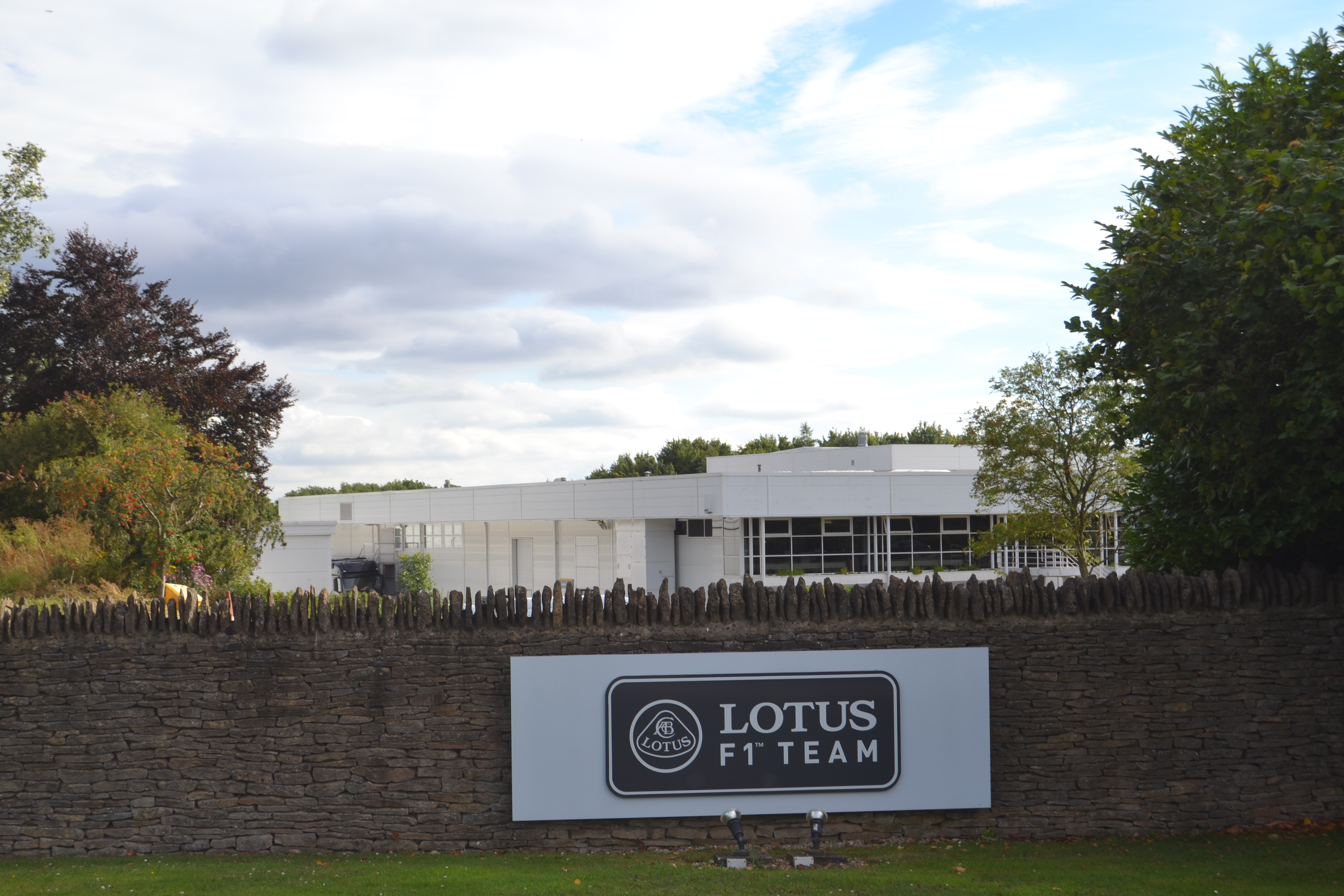
Team Enstone factory in 2015

In the winter of 1991–92, the team left Witney for the new Whiteways Technical Centre in Enstone, Oxfordshire. The team has remained in Enstone through various ownership changes. Enstone is one of several Formula One team bases located near the Silverstone Circuit, an area informally known as "Motorsport Valley".

From 1986 to 2001, Benetton entered 260 races and won the 1995 Constructors' Championship and the 1994 and 1995 Drivers' Championships (both with Schumacher). It also recorded twenty-seven victories and 102 podiums. The team's race-winning drivers were Schumacher (19), Nelson Piquet (3), Gerhard Berger (2), Johnny Herbert (2), and Alessandro Nannini (1). In addition, future World Champion Jenson Button raced for Benetton during its final year before its rebrand to Renault.

=== Renault / Lotus Renault GP (2002–11) ===
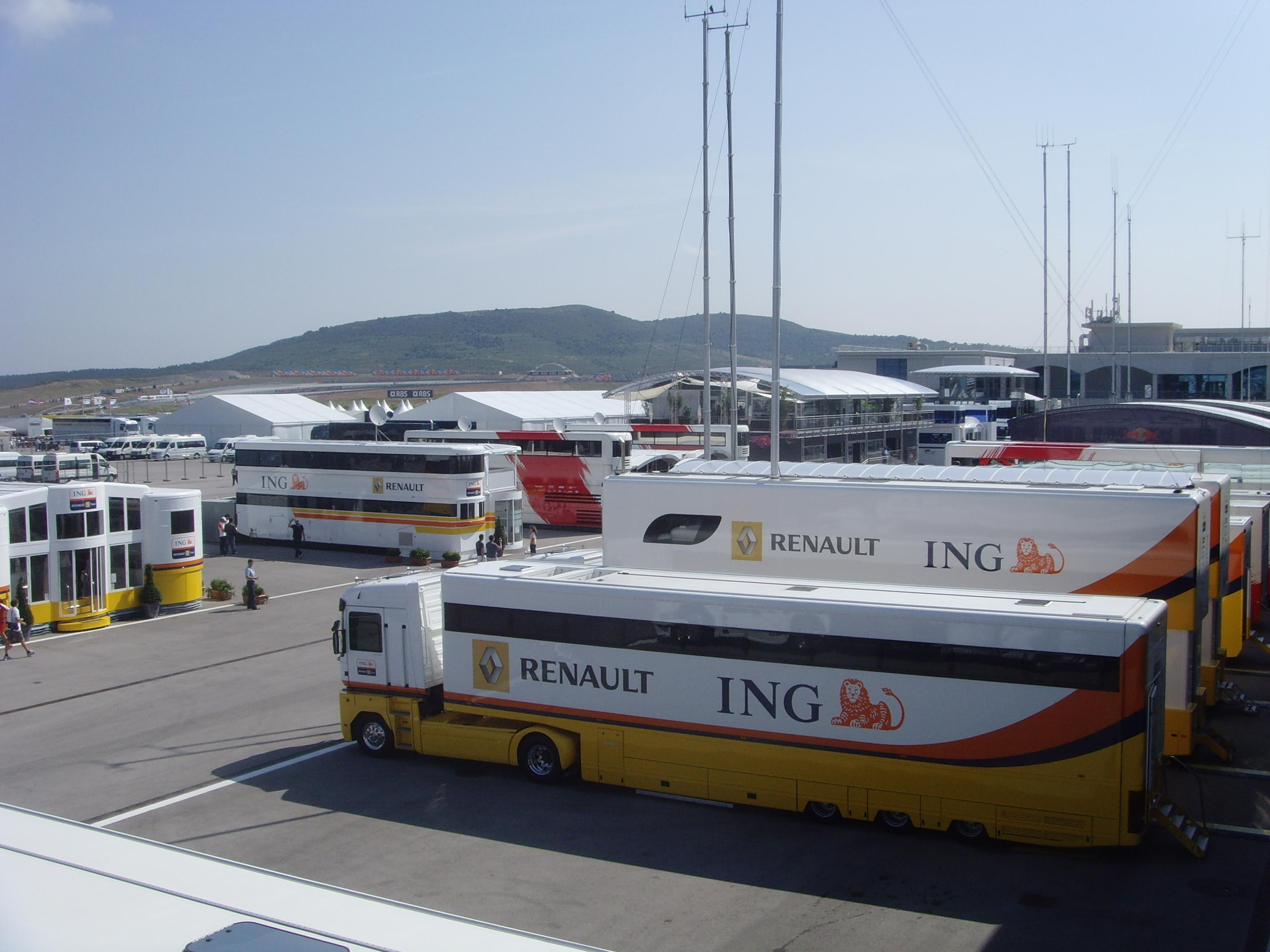
The Renault motor home and trucks at the 2009 Turkish Grand Prix

Renault, Benetton's engine supplier, (Note: Renault supplied Benetton with factory-supported engines between 1995 and 1997, after which it exited Formula One and ended its factory support of the team. Following its exit, it allowed Benetton to continue using Renault engines, which were built by Mecachrome, distributed by Supertec, and rebadged as Playlife.) purchased Benetton in March 2000 for somewhere between £76 million and £80 million (around $232 million in April 2026 US dollars). The team completed one final season under the Benetton name in 2001 before being renamed to the Renault F1 Team for the 2002 season. Renault invested heavily in the team and recruited new personnel. Led by Fernando Alonso, the team enjoyed a renaissance in the mid-2000s. However, following the "Crashgate" scandal, Briatore and Symonds were forced to leave the team, and several Renault sponsors cut ties with Enstone. Revenue fell by forty-nine percent in 2010, with the loss of £41m/year title sponsor ING single-handedly plunging the team into the red. In addition, Alonso left for Ferrari.

From 2002 to 2011, Renault entered 280 races and won double world championships in 2005 and 2006, with Alonso winning both Drivers' Championships. It also recorded twenty victories and fifty-nine podiums. The team's race-winning drivers were Alonso (17), Giancarlo Fisichella (2), and Jarno Trulli (1).

=== Lotus F1 (2012–15) ===
Genii Capital purchased a seventy-five percent controlling stake in the team ahead of the 2010 season, and bought out the remaining twenty-five percent for €5 million at the end of the year. The team retained the Renault name for the 2011 season, but starting in the 2012 season, Genii's primary sponsor, Lotus Cars, signed a deal to rename the team to Lotus F1. The team had no corporate connection to the old Team Lotus. To honor its hometown, the team's chassis designations all contained an "E" for "Enstone".

Led by Kimi Räikkönen, the team was initially quite competitive, exceeding its own expectations. The team gave Räikkönen a contract that awarded a €50,000 bonus for every World Championship point (i.e., €19.5 million over two years), which was said to have nearly bankrupted the team. Räikkönen's salary was not the only problem for Lotus, which posted a combined net loss of £184 million under Genii's ownership. The team laid off ninety-three staffers in 2015.

From 2012 to 2015, Lotus entered seventy-seven races and recorded two victories (both by Räikkönen) and twenty-five podiums (all by Räikkönen and Romain Grosjean).

=== Renault / Alpine (2016–present) ===
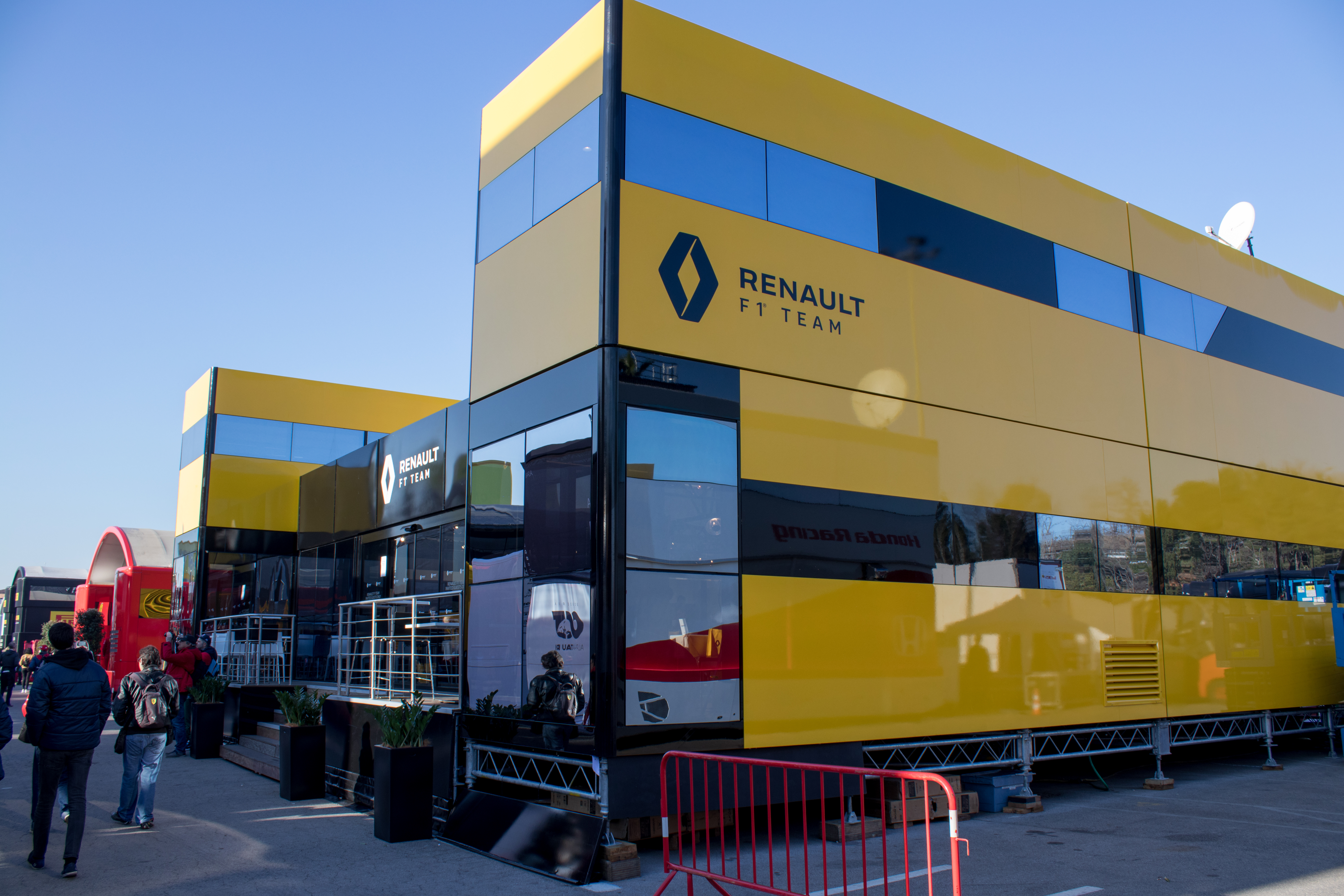
The Renault motor home at 2020 pre-season testing

At the end of the 2015 season, Renault repurchased a 90% stake in Team Enstone from Genii for £1. It bought Genii's remaining shares in 2022, but at the end of the 2023 season, it sold a 24% stake to a syndicate of outside investors led by Alec Scheiner for €200 million, which valued the whole team at roughly $900 million. The Renault team name returned for the 2016 season. Starting with the 2021 season, Renault renamed the team to the Alpine F1 Team, after their subsidiary marque Automobiles Alpine.

During Carlos Ghosn's tenure at Renault, the team was dogged by accusations that the parent company was unwilling to invest enough money in the team to be title contenders. Adrian Newey (whose Red Bull team acrimoniously stopped purchasing Renault engines in 2018) said that Ghosn personally told him he was not interested in the sport. Following Ghosn's ousting in 2018, the team went through several senior management changes in the 2020s.

Renault rehired Briatore as a special advisor in 2024, with significant influence over personnel and management decisions. He became Alpine's de facto team principal in mid-2025. In Briatore's first year, Enstone's workforce declined by twenty-five percent. In addition, Renault stopped producing F1 engines. Alpine secured a customer supply of Mercedes engines. Briatore initially claimed he was carrying out Renault's orders. However, after Alpine began its Mercedes partnership, he changed course and said that he had conditioned his return to Enstone on the Mercedes switch.

From 2016 to 2020, as Renault, the team entered 100 races and recorded three podiums (by Daniel Ricciardo and Esteban Ocon). As of the 2026 São Paulo Grand Prix, Alpine has won one race (by Ocon) and recorded six podiums (by Ocon, Fernando Alonso, and Pierre Gasly).

== Summary of constructor lineage ==
- (United Kingdom) Toleman — based in Witney; competed with a British licence from the 1981 season to the 1985 season.
- (United Kingdom) / (Italy) Benetton — competed from the 1986 season to the 2001 season, holding a British licence until the 1995 season and then switched to the Italian licence from the 1996 season onwards; based in Witney until the end of the 1991 season before moving to Enstone ahead of the 1992 season.
- (France) / (United Kingdom) Renault — French car manufacturer Renault's Formula One operation was based out of Enstone for two stints, the first lasting from the 2002 season to the 2011 season, and the second from the 2016 season to the 2020 season. The team held a French licence throughout both periods except for the 2011 season when they competed under a British licence. (Note: Renault had previously competed in Formula One from the 1977 season to the 1985 season with a French licence and a team based in Viry-Châtillon, France.)
- (United Kingdom) Lotus — operated from the 2012 season to the 2015 season under a British licence, with Lotus Cars having been Renault's title sponsor during the 2011 season. (Note: Not to be confused with Team Lotus, Pacific Team Lotus, or Team Lotus (2010–2011), which were largely unrelated organisations.)
- (France) Alpine — a constructor named after Renault's subsidiary brand Automobiles Alpine has been operated by the Enstone organisation since the 2021 season with a French licence.
