= David Sanchez (engineer) =

French engineer

- Born: 31 January 1980 (age 46); Clermont-l'Hérault, France
- Education: École nationale supérieure de mécanique et d'aérotechnique
- Occupation: Engineer
- Employer: Alpine
- Known for: Formula One engineer

David Sanchez (born 31 January 1980) is a French Formula One engineer. He has been employed by the Renault, Ferrari, and McLaren Formula One teams. As of 2024, he serves as Executive Technical Director at Alpine.

== Career ==
After graduating from the ISAE-ENSMA, Sanchez started his motorsport career working as an aerodynamicist for the Renault Formula One team as a junior aerodynamicist in 2005. He moved to McLaren in 2007 initially as a senior aerodynamicist before progressing onto becoming an aerodynamics team leader being a part of the team that developed the innovative F-Duct seen in the McLaren MP4-25.

Seeking a new challenge, Sanchez decided to join Ferrari in October 2012 as a Principle Aerodynamicist, later replacing the departing Dirk de Beer as chief aerodynamicist in 2016 before heading up the entire department in 2019. In 2021, Sanchez was promoted again to chief engineer, vehicle concept, leading the design, and development of the 2022 Ferrari car.

Sanchez left Ferrari in March 2023, and entered a period of gardening leave, before returning to McLaren as technical director of car concept and performance, effective 2024, replacing James Key. He left McLaren by mutual consent on 2 April 2024, as the role he had envisioned was "not aligned with the reality of the position". On 2 May 2024, Alpine announced his appointment as Executive Technical Director.
