= Alpine F1 Team =

French-owned Formula One racing team

(France) Alpine-Mercedes
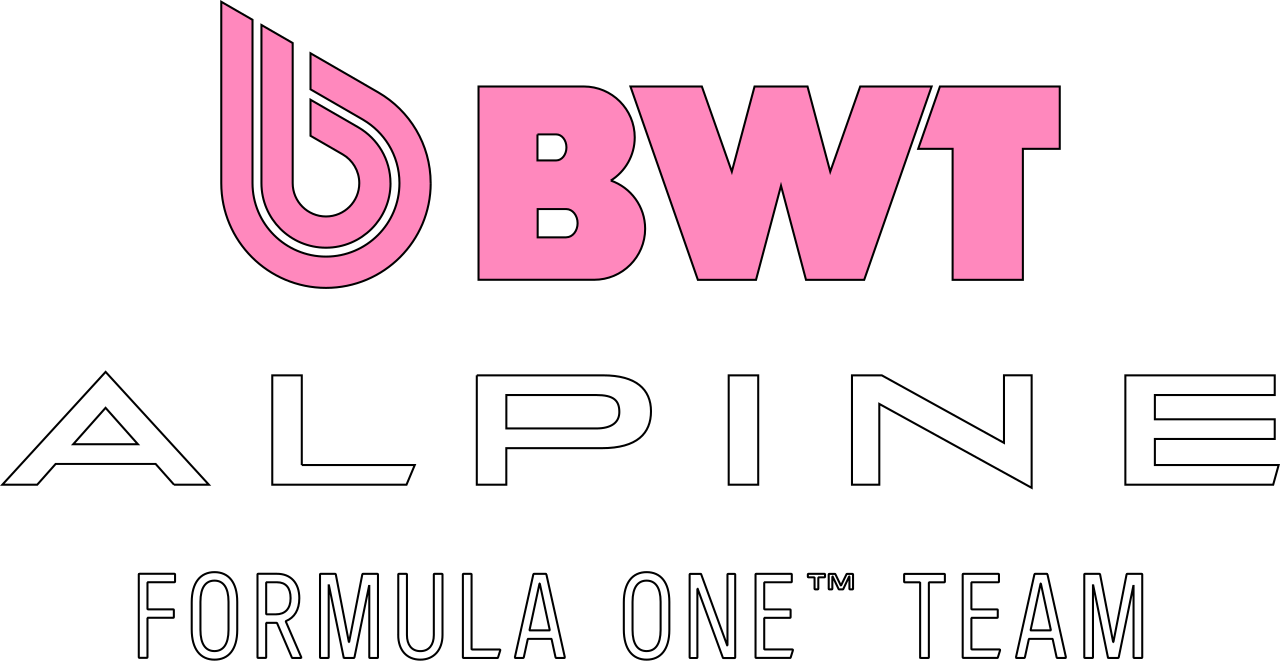
- Full name: BWT Alpine Formula One Team
- Base: Enstone, Oxfordshire, England (Chassis design and assembly); Viry-Châtillon, France (Power unit; 2021–2025)
- Team principal(s): Flavio Briatore (Executive Advisor); Steve Nielsen (Managing Director)
- Chief Technical Officer: Mike Elliott
- Technical director: David Sanchez (Executive Technical Director); Jason Somerville (Deputy Technical Director); Joe Burnell (Technical Director, Engineering); Ciaron Pilbeam (Technical Director, Performance)
- Website: Official website
- Previous name: Renault F1 Team

2026 Formula One World Championship
- Race drivers: 10. (France) Pierre Gasly; 43. (Argentina) Franco Colapinto
- Test driver(s): (Estonia) Paul Aron (India) Kush Maini
- Chassis: A526
- Engine: Mercedes
- Tyres: Pirelli

Formula One World Championship career
- First entry: 2021 Bahrain Grand Prix
- Last entry: 2026 São Paulo Grand Prix
- Races entered: 134 (134 starts)
- Engines: Renault, Mercedes
- Constructors' Championships: 0
- Drivers' Championships: 0
- Race victories: 1
- Podiums: 6
- Points: 604
- Pole positions: 1
- Fastest laps: 1
- 2025 position: 10th (22 pts)

Alpine Racing Limited (/ˈælpiːn/ AL-peen), currently racing as BWT Alpine Formula One Team for sponsorship reasons, is the name under which the Enstone-based Formula One team has been competing since the start of the 2021 Formula One World Championship. Formerly named Renault F1 Team and owned by the French automotive company Groupe Renault as well as Renault–Nissan–Mitsubishi Alliance, the team was rebranded for 2021 to promote Renault's sports car brand, Alpine, and continued to serve as Renault's works team, a position the team kept until Renault pulled out of Formula One (as an engine manufacturer) at the end of 2025.

The team uses Mercedes engines, having previously done so as Lotus in 2015. The team is based in Enstone, Oxfordshire, England and competes with a French licence. The team fields Pierre Gasly and Franco Colapinto as its full-time drivers. In its current form as Alpine, the team's sole win was achieved by Esteban Ocon at the 2021 Hungarian Grand Prix, and its first pole position was achieved by Gasly at the 2026 Italian Grand Prix.

== Background ==
=== Origins of the team ===
The team has a long history, first competing in Formula One in 1981 as Toleman, when the team was based in Witney, England. In 1986, following its purchase by Benetton Group, it was renamed and competed as Benetton. As Benetton, it won the 1995 Constructors' Championship and its driver, Michael Schumacher, won two Drivers' Championships in 1994 and 1995. Prior to the 1992 season it moved to its current location in Enstone, UK.

By the 2000 season, Renault had purchased the team (for the first time), and by the 2002 season its name was changed to Renault F1 Team, and it was racing as Renault. Renault won the Constructors' Championship in 2005 and 2006 and its driver, Fernando Alonso won the Drivers' Championships in the same two years. In 2011, Lotus Cars came on board as a sponsor, and the team's name changed to Lotus Renault GP, though still racing as just "Renault" for that season. By 2012, Genii Capital had a majority stake in the team, and from 2012 until 2015 the team's name was Lotus F1 Team, after its branding partner, and it raced as "Lotus".

At the end of 2015, Renault had taken over the team for a second time, renaming it to Renault Sport Formula One Team. The team raced as "Renault" again, from 2016, and continued as such until the end of the 2020 season. When discussing the history of the organisation as a whole rather than those of specific constructors it has operated, the colloquialism "Team Enstone" is generally used. The team operates in a 17,000 m^{2} (180,000 sq ft) facility on a 17-acre (6.9 ha) site in Enstone. By May 2023, Alpine had approximately 1,000 personnel in Enstone and 350 in Viry-Châtillon.

==== Early Formula One involvement ====
The involvement of the sportscar manufacturer Automobiles Alpine in Formula One can be traced back to 1968, when the Alpine A350 Grand Prix car was built, powered by a Gordini V8 engine. However, after initial testing with Mauro Bianchi at Circuit Zandvoort, the project was ended when it was found that the engine produced around 300 horsepower (220 kW) compared to the Cosworth V8 engines' 400. In 1975, the company produced the Alpine A500 prototype to test a 1.5 L V6 turbo engine for the Renault factory team which would eventually début in 1977.

In September 2020, Groupe Renault announced their intention to use "Alpine" as their works team's new name going forward to promote the Alpine brand, and thus the team became known as the "Alpine F1 Team" whilst retiring the "Renault F1 Team" moniker after five years.

In June 2023, a group of investors, including actor Ryan Reynolds, agreed to a deal to pay €200 million for a 24% stake in the Alpine Formula One team. More investors joined the group later in 2023, including NFL players Patrick Mahomes, Travis Kelce, golfer Rory McIlroy, former heavyweight champion boxer Anthony Joshua and footballers Trent Alexander-Arnold and Juan Mata.

== Ownership ==
In June 2023, Renault Group sold a 24% stake in Alpine Racing Ltd to a consortium led by Otro Capital, RedBird Capital Partners and Maximum Effort Investments for €200 million. Additional minority investors joined the group later in 2023, including NFL players Patrick Mahomes and Travis Kelce, golfer Rory McIlroy, footballers Trent Alexander-Arnold and Juan Mata, and former heavyweight boxing champion Anthony Joshua.

In 2025, Renault further adjusted Alpine Racing Ltd's ownership structure by selling an additional minority stake to new financial partners, reducing its shareholding to approximately 60%. The expanded investor group built on the earlier 2023 transaction and was intended to strengthen Alpine's commercial growth strategy and increase long-term Formula One investment capacity. In 2026, it was reported that Otro Capital was looking to sell its stake in Alpine.

== Racing history ==
=== Rebranded Renault works team (2021–2025) ===
==== 2021 season ====
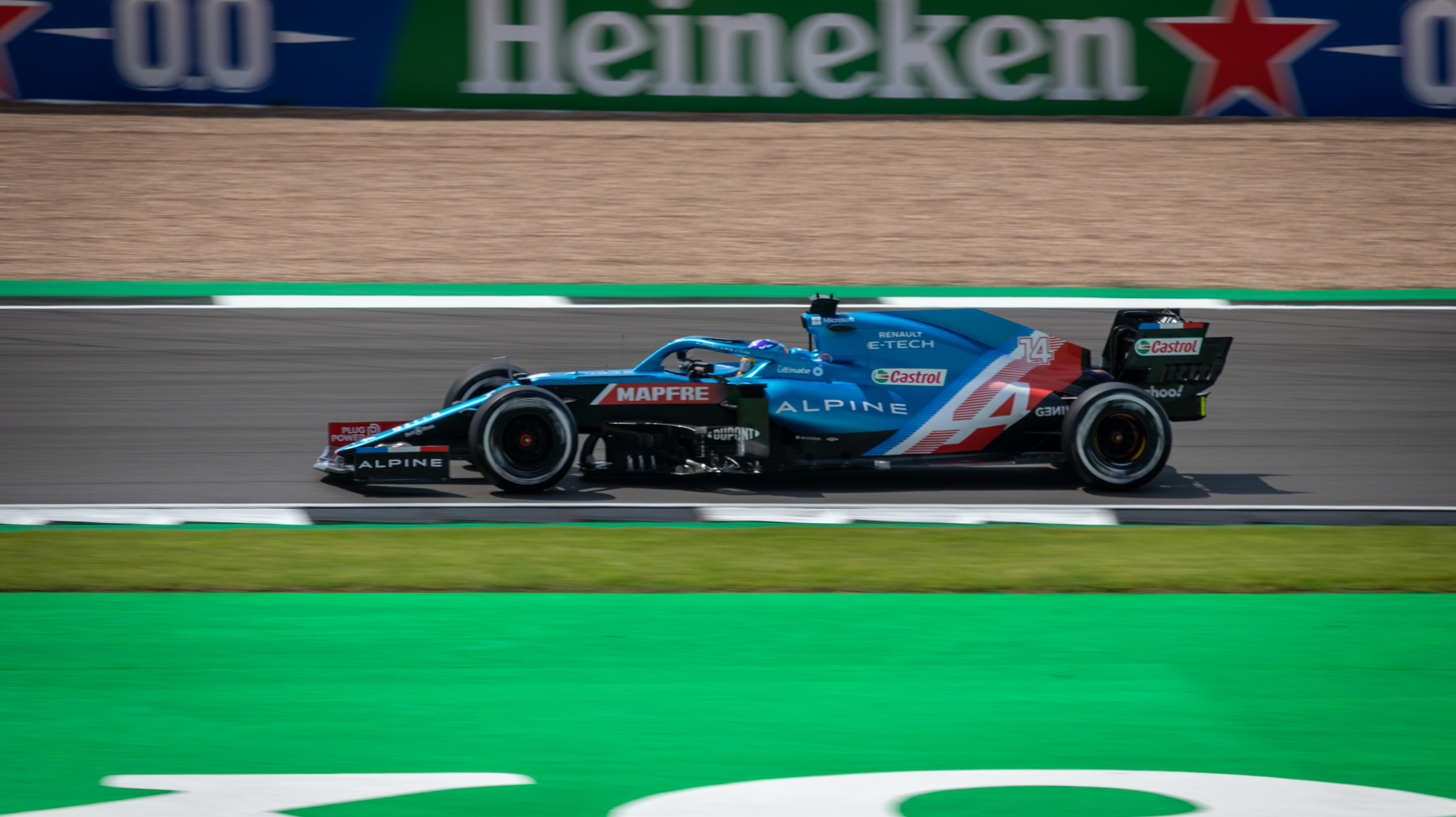
Fernando Alonso driving the A521 at the 2021 British Grand Prix

For 2021 Alpine signed two-time World Champion Fernando Alonso to replace an outgoing Daniel Ricciardo. This would mark Alonso's third spell driving for Team Enstone having driven for them from 2003 to 2006 and again from 2008 to 2009 and won two drivers championships with the team in 2005 and 2006 when the team used the Renault name. Esteban Ocon was retained from the 2020 Renault team. The Alpine car used Renault engines. Renault team boss, Cyril Abiteboul, announced he would leave as Renault transitioned to Alpine. Abiteboul was replaced by Davide Brivio, who previously worked for Suzuki in MotoGP.

Alpine's first race ended with Alonso being forced to retire, after debris caused his car to overheat. Ocon was hit by Aston Martin driver, Sebastian Vettel. Despite a disappointing start, Alpine scored in the next fifteen races, including a victory for Ocon at the 2021 Hungarian Grand Prix.

It marked the first victory for a French driver driving for a French team since Olivier Panis' triumph at the 1996 Monaco Grand Prix driving for the Ligier team as well as the first victory for a French driver driving a French car powered by a French engine since Alain Prost's triumph at the 1983 Austrian Grand Prix driving a Renault car. Alonso also scored a podium in the Qatar Grand Prix, after qualifying fifth but starting third due to Max Verstappen and Valtteri Bottas gaining grid penalties.

==== 2022 season ====
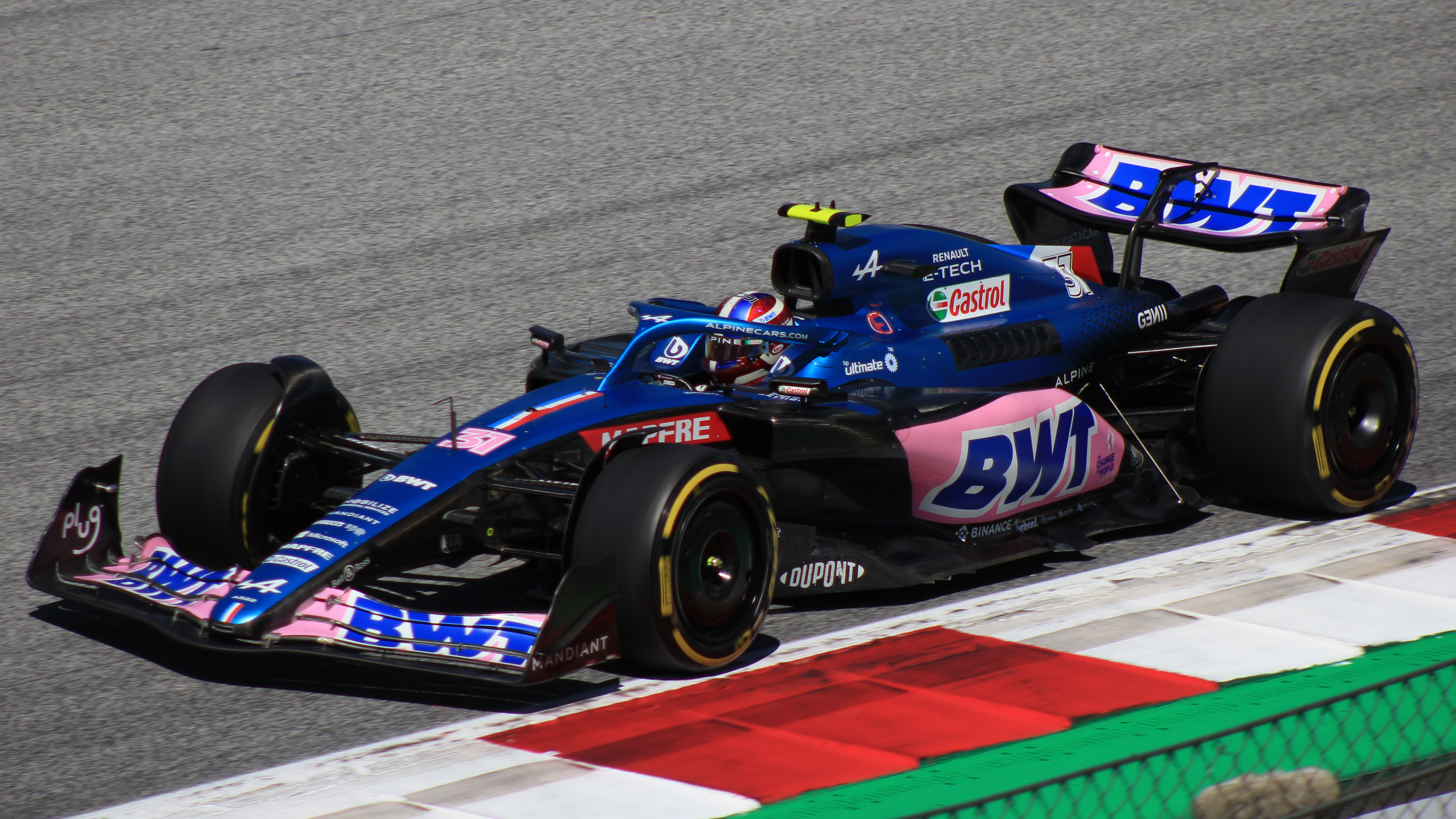
Esteban Ocon driving the A522 at the 2022 Austrian Grand Prix

In January 2022, both team principal, Marcin Budkowski, and non-executive director, Alain Prost, left their roles. Otmar Szafnauer, formerly of Aston Martin F1 Team, was announced as the new team principal in the same month. Former deputy secretary-general for sport at the FIA, Bruno Famin, has been recruited as executive director of Alpine at Viry-Châtillon, responsible for power-unit development. Famin had also previously led Peugeot to three consecutive Dakar Rally victories as head of its sporting division from 2016 to 2018, and a Le Mans 24 Hours triumph in 2009 as technical head of its endurance program. Oscar Piastri replaced Daniil Kvyat as test driver. In February 2022, BWT became the title sponsor of the team, in a deal aimed at sustainability drive.

Alonso qualified in second for the Canadian Grand Prix, only behind Verstappen. This was his best qualifying position since the 2012 German Grand Prix, though he suffered an issue in the race and finished in ninth.

Even though the team would fail to finish on the podium during the campaign, consistent points finishes from both drivers resulted in the French marque finishing a best ever (to this day) fourth in the Constructors’ standings.

==== 2023 season ====
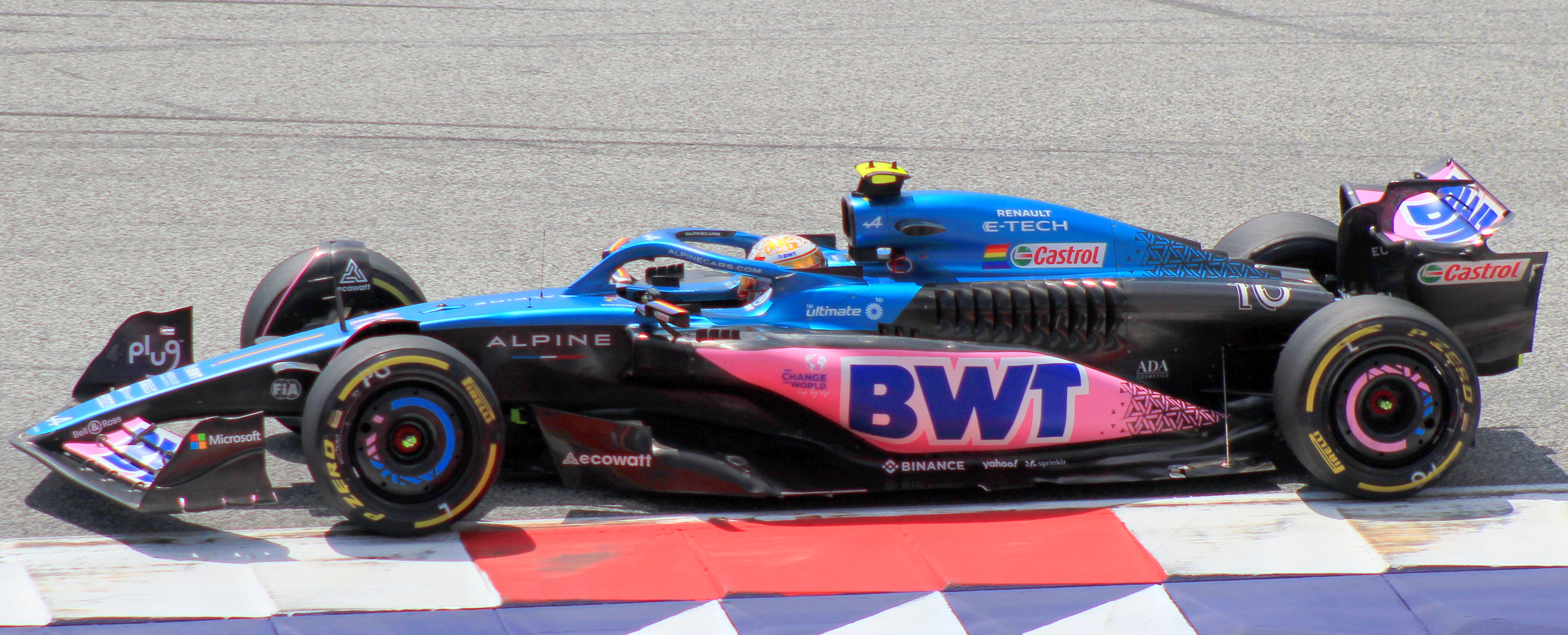
Pierre Gasly at the 2023 Austrian Grand Prix

Alonso moved to Aston Martin for the 2023 season because he wanted a multi-year contract extension, and Alpine was only willing to give him one more year in F1. Alpine announced that Piastri would be replacing Alonso; but Piastri immediately denied he had a contract to race with the team. Team principal Szafnauer criticised Piastri, saying that Piastri should show more loyalty to Alpine, and claimed that Piastri was thankful when told about his F1 promotion prior to Alpine's announcement. In September 2022, a hearing of the Contract Recognition Board determined that Alpine did not have a valid contract with Piastri and was free to race with rival team McLaren in 2023. During the 2022 Japanese Grand Prix weekend the team confirmed that Pierre Gasly has signed a multiple-year contract with them starting in 2023.

In July 2023, Laurent Rossi was replaced by Philippe Krief as CEO. During the Belgian Grand Prix weekend (which incidentally would also see Gasly claim a P3 podium in the Sprint race), Alpine announced that Szafnauer and sporting director Alan Permane would leave the team after the race. Chief technical officer Pat Fry would also leave the team at the end of the year to join Williams.

Alpine finished the season sixth in the Constructors' Championship, while Gasly and Ocon were 11th and 12th, respectively, in the drivers' standings. Despite the two-place drop in position compared to the previous year, the squad still did manage to take a pair of solid podiums (one P3 apiece for Ocon and Gasly in Monaco and Zandvoort respectively). The team reportedly lost about half a second per lap on average because the Renault power unit was lagging behind its rivals. Without this deficit, the team could have had performance similar to that of the Mercedes team.

==== 2024 season ====
Alpine retained the driver pairing of Gasly and Ocon for the 2024 season. At the Bahrain Grand Prix, the team locked out the bottom of the grid in qualifying and finished the race in 17th and 18th. After the race, it was announced that Alpine's technical director Matt Harman and head of aerodynamics Dirk de Beer had left the team, with the team moving to a structure of three technical directors, with Joe Burnell overseeing engineering, David Wheater for aerodynamics and Ciaron Pilbeam for performance. A few days later, it was reported that Bob Bell will leave his advisory role at Alpine to reunite with Fernando Alonso at Aston Martin in an operational role. On 2 May, David Sanchez, who had left McLaren a month earlier, was signed as executive technical director. In May 2024, Alpine announced the controversial return of Flavio Briatore to the team as an executive advisor. He previously worked at Team Enstone as team principal from 2000 to 2009, having previously resigned due to a race-fixing scandal.

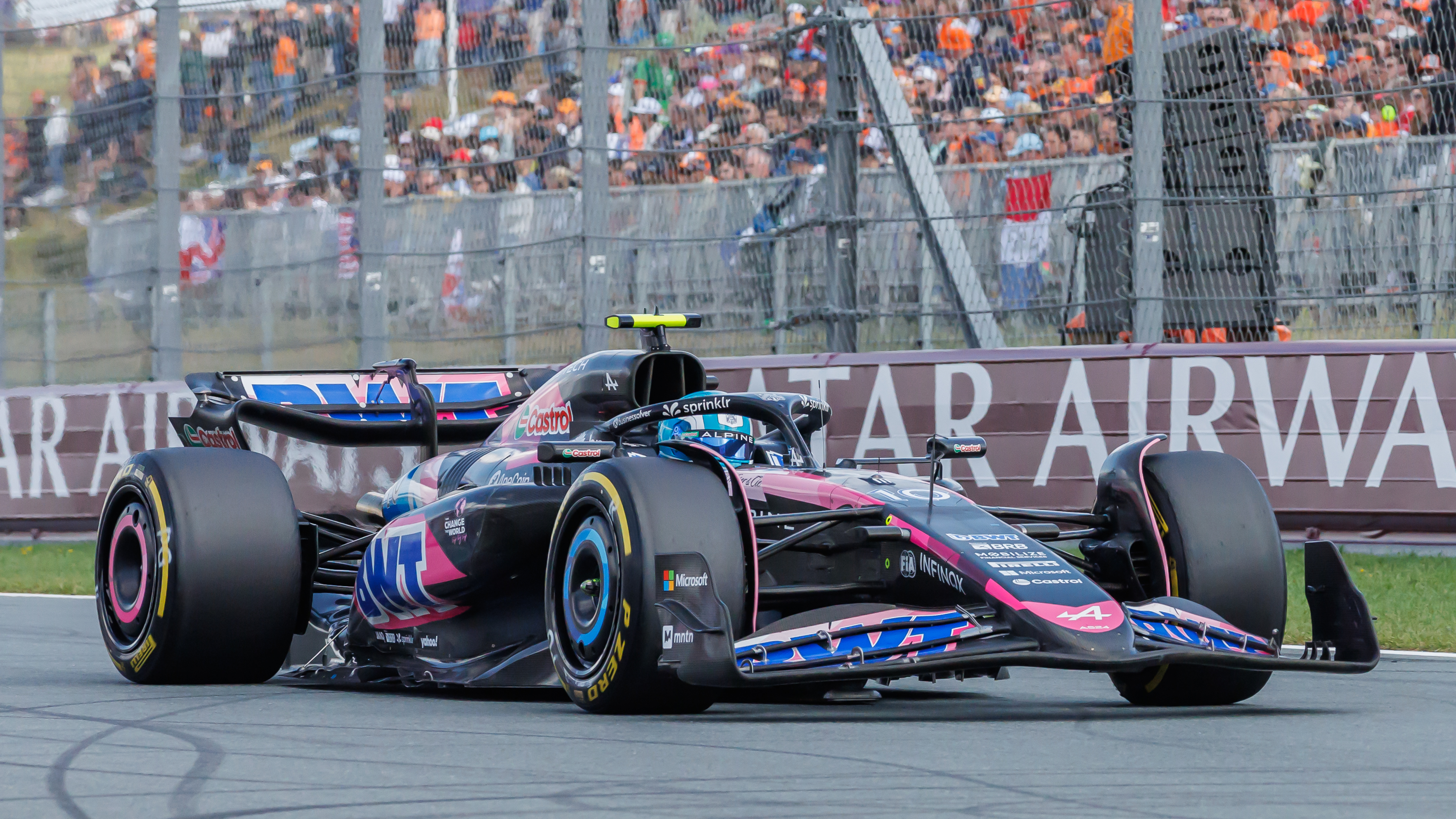
Gasly at the 2024 Dutch Grand Prix

After finishing out of the top ten four races later, Alpine scored their first points at the Miami Grand Prix where Ocon finished tenth. At the Monaco Grand Prix, Ocon collided with Gasly during an overtake attempt in the first lap, resulting in the former's retirement from damage. Ocon was issued a five-place grid penalty at the Canadian Grand Prix and later apologised for his role in the incident. Team principal Bruno Famin commented that there would be "appropriate consequences". A week later, Alpine announced that Ocon will leave the team at the end of the season following his contract running out. During the Belgian Grand Prix weekend, Alpine announced that team principal Bruno Famin would leave his role as team principal. Famin is set to move to Renault's mainline motorsports divisions. Famin's position was taken by Oliver Oakes from the Dutch Grand Prix onwards. Alpine scored a double podium at the 2024 São Paulo Grand Prix with Ocon finishing second and Gasly third behind only race winner and defending drivers champion Max Verstappen of Red Bull Racing, a result which moved Alpine from ninth to sixth in the Constructors' Championship ahead of the Haas, RB and Williams teams with three rounds remaining. This marked "Team Enstone's" first double podium under the Alpine name and their first double double under any name since the 2013 Korean Grand Prix when the team was known as Lotus F1.

The day after the Qatar Grand Prix—where Gasly finished 5th and Ocon DNFed due to a crash on the first lap—it was announced that Ocon would be released from the team early, prior to his scheduled move to Haas in 2025. In his place, Jack Doohan, who was already signed for the team in 2025, made an early debut for the last round of the season at the 2024 Abu Dhabi Grand Prix.

==== 2025 season ====
For 2025, Gasly was retained by the team for what will be Alpine's last season with a works Renault power unit. He was paired by Jack Doohan, who has served as the team’s reserve driver in previous seasons was promoted to a full time race drive replacing Esteban Ocon who joined Haas. Four drivers were selected to replace Doohan as test and reserve driver for the 2025 season, including Paul Aron, Franco Colapinto, Ryō Hirakawa, and Kush Maini. Hirakawa left for Haas shortly after the Japanese Grand Prix. BP and Castrol left Alpine after eight years to supply fuels and lubricants to the impending Audi entry, so Eni and Valvoline joined the team as official suppliers.

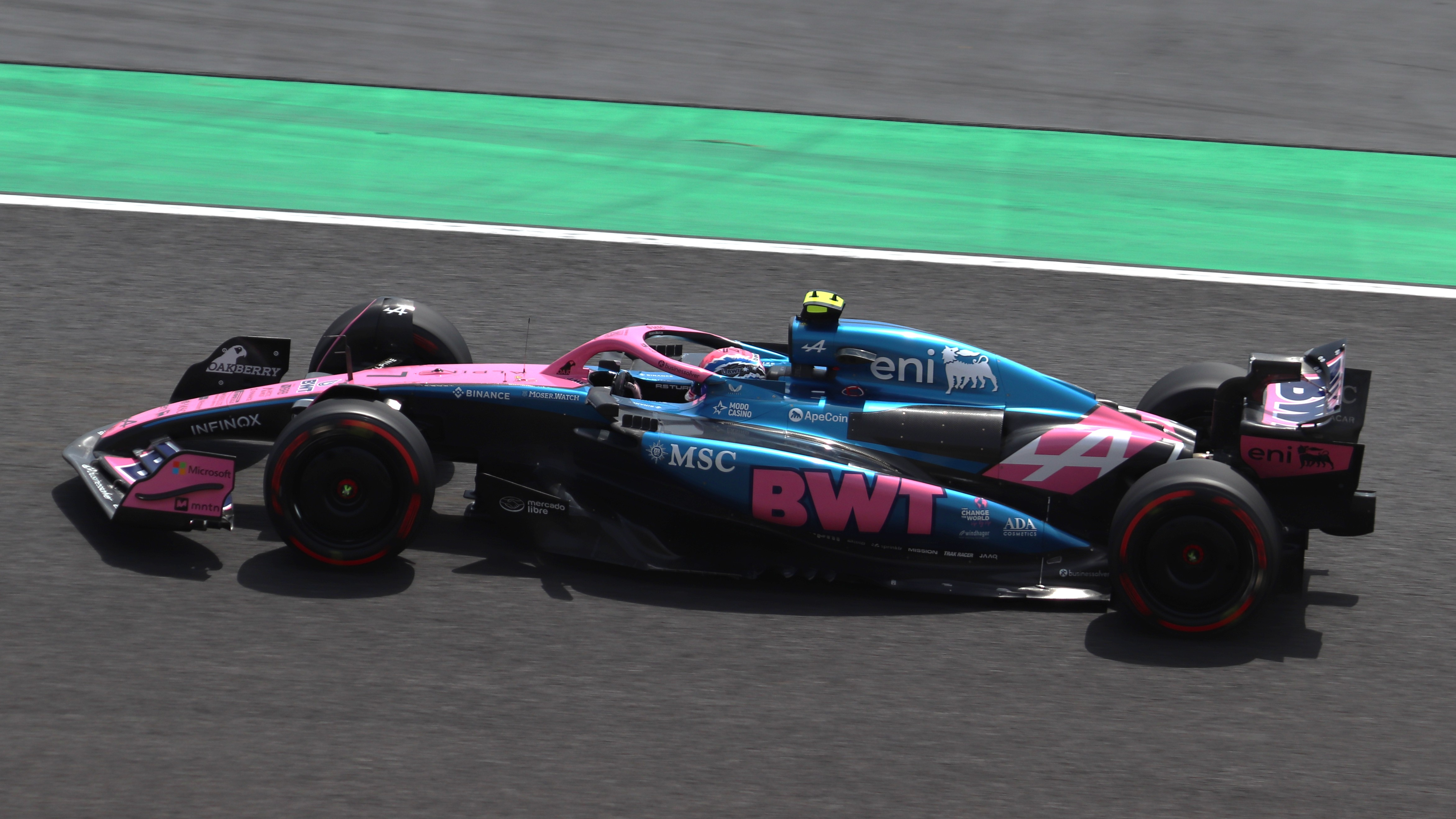
Jack Doohan at the 2025 Japanese Grand Prix

The 2025 season started poorly for Alpine, with the team sitting bottom of the Constructors' Championship in 10th place after the first three rounds in Australia, China and Japan, being the only team not to score a point in any of those three rounds. Following a poor Melbourne weekend for the team, Doohan was involved in numerous wheel to wheel incidents with other drivers during the China weekend in both the Sprint and the Grand Prix which saw him pick up four penalty points on his FIA Super Licence after only two Grands Prix. To make matters worse, Gasly was disqualified from the main Grand Prix result due to his A525 chassis being underweight. The Ferrari of Charles Leclerc was disqualified for the same infringement at the same race. At the following round at the Japanese Grand Prix, having had to vacate his car to Ryō Hirakawa for the first practice session that weekend, Doohan returned to the cockpit for the second practice session only for him to crash heavily after failing to close his car's DRS system before going through the first turn. Doohan started and finished the race in Japan in 19th, while Gasly started 11th and finished 13th in the same event. The Japanese round also laid bare the continued deficencies of the Alpine's Renault power unit once more, with data suggesting the Alpines losing at best 0.6 seconds in the second sector at the lap at the Suzuka Circuit (which features two long straights), mostly because of the power deficit of their Renault engines.

Following the Miami Grand Prix, team principal Oliver Oakes resigned, with Executive Advisor Flavio Briatore becoming the de facto team principal and racing director Dave Greenwood assuming Oakes' formal duties. Doohan was also confirmed to have lost his Alpine seat to Colapinto on a "rotating seat" basis, with the latter scheduled to debut at the subsequent Emilia Romagna Grand Prix and race for Alpine for five races. Doohan would be demoted to reserve driver in Colapinto's place.

Even after bringing in Colapinto, Alpine's struggles continued throughout the season; Colapinto suffered a big crash in qualifying in Imola, and neither he nor Gasly was able to score points. Gasly suffered an early retirement in Monaco after hitting old AlphaTauri teammate Yuki Tsunoda, but managed to score a point in the subsequent Spanish Grand Prix. The team recorded three further finishes in the points in Britain, Belgium, and São Paulo. However a pointless weekend at the penultimate round in Qatar guaranteed that the team would finish bottom of the constructors' championship in their final year with a works engine, 46 points behind 9th placed Sauber with a maximum of 43 constructor points available at the season finale in Abu Dhabi. Alpine in 2025 scored a record high number of points for a team finishing last in the constructors' championship.

=== Mercedes customer team (2026–present) ===
==== 2026 season ====
On 30 September 2024, owing to lack of strong results with its power unit during the V6 turbo-hybrid era since it began in 2014, Renault announced it would be ending its engine programme following the conclusion of the 2025 championship and would not be making engines for the new 2026 regulations. This means Alpine lost its status as a works team and become a customer team of Mercedes, whilst still being majority owned by Groupe Renault. Alpine utilised Mercedes engines and gearboxes from the 2026 season onwards.

For 2026, Alpine retained Gasly, with Colapinto being signed for a full-time drive. After just 3 races, the Mercedes gearbox helped both drivers gain points, thus being a bigger improvement than 2025 so far.

This includes numerous points finishes, a short-lived podium for Gasly in Monaco (taken away months later due to the reinstatement of two five-second penalties he earned), and a shock first career pole position for him and his team at Monza. All of this has culminated in the squad currently sitting in a respectable P6 in the Constructors’ Championship.

==== 2027 season ====
On 27 May 2026, it was announced that Gucci would replace BWT as the title sponsor from 2027 onwards, competing as Gucci Racing Alpine Formula One Team.

== Complete Formula One results ==
Key

Key
Colour	Result
Gold	Winner
Silver	Second place
Bronze	Third place
Green	Other points position
Blue	Other classified position
Blue	Not classified, finished (NC)
Purple	Not classified, retired (Ret)
Red	Did not qualify (DNQ)
Black	Disqualified (DSQ)
White	Did not start (DNS)
White	Race cancelled (C)
Blank	Did not practice (DNP)
Blank	Excluded (EX)
Blank	Did not arrive (DNA)
Blank	Withdrawn (WD)
Blank	Did not enter (empty cell)
Annotation	Meaning
P	Pole position
F	Fastest lap
Superscript number	Points-scoring position in sprint

Year	Chassis	Engine	Tyres	Drivers	1	2	3	4	5	6	7	8	9	10	11	12	13	14	15	16	17	18	19	20	21	22	23	24	Points	WCC
2021	A521	Renault; E-Tech 20B; 1.6 V6 t	P		BHR	EMI	POR	ESP	MON	AZE	FRA	STY	AUT	GBR	HUN	BEL	NED	ITA	RUS	TUR	USA	MXC	SAP	QAT	SAU	ABU			155	5th
2021	A521	Renault; E-Tech 20B; 1.6 V6 t	P	(Spain) Fernando Alonso	Ret	10	8	17	13	6	8	9	10	7	4	11	6	8	6	16	Ret	9	9	3	13	8			155	5th
2021	A521	Renault; E-Tech 20B; 1.6 V6 t	P	(France) Esteban Ocon	13	9	7	9	9	Ret	14	14	Ret	9	1	7^{‡}	9	10	14	10	Ret	13	8	5	4	9			155	5th
2022	A522	Renault; E-Tech RE22; 1.6 V6 t	P		BHR	SAU	AUS	EMI	MIA	ESP	MON	AZE	CAN	GBR	AUT	FRA	HUN	BEL	NED	ITA	SIN	JPN	USA	MXC	SAP	ABU			173	4th
2022	A522	Renault; E-Tech RE22; 1.6 V6 t	P	(Spain) Fernando Alonso	9	Ret	17	Ret	11	9	7	7	9	5	10	6	8	5	6	Ret	Ret	7	7	19†	5	Ret			173	4th
2022	A522	Renault; E-Tech RE22; 1.6 V6 t	P	(France) Esteban Ocon	7	6	7	14	8	7	12	10	6	Ret	5^{6}	8	9	7	9	11	Ret	4	11	8	8	7			173	4th
2023	A523	Renault E-Tech RE23 1.6 V6 t	P		BHR	SAU	AUS	AZE	MIA	MON	ESP	CAN	AUT	GBR	HUN	BEL	NED	ITA	SIN	JPN	QAT	USA	MXC	SAP	LVG	ABU			120	6th
2023	A523	Renault E-Tech RE23 1.6 V6 t	P	(France) Pierre Gasly	9	9	13†	14	8	7	10	12	10	18†	Ret	11^{3}	3	15	6	10	12	6^{7}	11	7	11	13			120	6th
2023	A523	Renault E-Tech RE23 1.6 V6 t	P	(France) Esteban Ocon	Ret	8	14†	15	9	3	8	8	14^{7}	Ret	Ret	8	10	Ret	Ret	9	7	Ret	10	10	4	12			120	6th
2024	A524	Renault E-Tech RE24 1.6 V6 t	P		BHR	SAU	AUS	JPN	CHN	MIA	EMI	MON	CAN	ESP	AUT	GBR	HUN	BEL	NED	ITA	AZE	SIN	USA	MXC	SAP	LVG	QAT	ABU	65	6th
2024	A524	Renault E-Tech RE24 1.6 V6 t	P	(France) Pierre Gasly	18	Ret	13	16	13	12	16	10	9	9	10	DNS	Ret	13	9	15	12	17	12	10	3^{7}	Ret	5	7	65	6th
2024	A524	Renault E-Tech RE24 1.6 V6 t	P	(France) Esteban Ocon	17	13	16	15	11	10	14	Ret	10	10	12	16	18	9	15	14	15	13	18^{F}	13	2	17	Ret		65	6th
2024	A524	Renault E-Tech RE24 1.6 V6 t	P	(Australia) Jack Doohan																								15	65	6th
2025	A525	Renault E-Tech RE25 1.6 V6 t	P		AUS	CHN	JPN	BHR	SAU	MIA	EMI	MON	ESP	CAN	AUT	GBR	BEL	HUN	NED	ITA	AZE	SIN	USA	MXC	SAP	LVG	QAT	ABU	22	10th
2025	A525	Renault E-Tech RE25 1.6 V6 t	P	(Australia) Jack Doohan	Ret	13	15	14	17	Ret																			22	10th
2025	A525	Renault E-Tech RE25 1.6 V6 t	P	(Argentina) Franco Colapinto							16	13	15	13	15	DNS	19	18	11	17	19	16	17	16	15	15	14	20	22	10th
2025	A525	Renault E-Tech RE25 1.6 V6 t	P	(France) Pierre Gasly	11	DSQ	13	7	Ret	13^{8}	13	Ret	8	15	13	6	10	19	17	16	18	19	19	15	10^{8}	13	16	19	22	10th
2026	A526	Mercedes-AMG F1 M17 E Performance 1.6 V6 t	P		AUS	CHN	JPN	MIA	CAN	MON	BCN	AUT	GBR	BEL	HUN	NED	ITA	ESP	AZE	BHR	SIN	USA	MXC	SAP	LVG	QAT	ABU		69*	6th*
2026	A526	Mercedes-AMG F1 M17 E Performance 1.6 V6 t	P	(Argentina) Franco Colapinto	14	10	16	7	6	14	10	15	9	10	15	14	9	7	Ret	13	Ret	Ret	15	13					69*	6th*
2026	A526	Mercedes-AMG F1 M17 E Performance 1.6 V6 t	P	(France) Pierre Gasly	10	6	7	Ret^{8}	8	7	7	13	10	11	12	10^{8}	7^{P}	12	Ret	16	11	10	17	14					69*	6th*

Notes

- * – Season still in progress.
- ^{‡} – Half points awarded as less than 75% of race distance was completed.

== Esports ==
=== Esports Drivers' Champions ===
The following drivers won the Formula One Esports Drivers' Championship for Alpine Sim Racing

- (Wales) Otis Lawrence (2026)

=== Esports results ===
Results in bold indicate pole position; results in italics indicate fastest lap (key).

Year	Chassis	Engine	Tyres	Drivers	1	2	3	4	5	6	7	8	9	10	11	12	Points	WCC
2021	Alpine A521	Renault; E-Tech 20B; 1.6 V6 tt	P		BHR	CHN	RBR	GBR	ITA	BEL	POR	NED	USA	EMI	MEX	BRA	123	5th
2021	Alpine A521	Renault; E-Tech 20B; 1.6 V6 tt	P	(France) Nicolas Longuet	**2**	18	9	4	12	5	12		**3**		7	**7**	123	5th
2021	Alpine A521	Renault; E-Tech 20B; 1.6 V6 tt	P	(Chile) Fabrizio Donoso	10	2		17	4		3	16		14	17	19	123	5th
2021	Alpine A521	Renault; E-Tech 20B; 1.6 V6 tt	P	(Hungary) Patrik Sipos			17			17		8	16	8			123	5th
2022	Alpine A522	Renault; E-Tech RE22; 1.6 V6 tt	P		BHR	EMI	GBR	RBR	BEL	NED	ITA	MEX	USA	JPN	BRA	UAE	13	9th
2022	Alpine A522	Renault; E-Tech RE22; 1.6 V6 tt	P	(Hungary) Patrik Sipos	18	18	8	14	16	16	8		18	11	12	14	13	9th
2022	Alpine A522	Renault; E-Tech RE22; 1.6 V6 tt	P	(Slovakia) Filip Prešnajder	11	15		20	20		9	13					13	9th
2022	Alpine A522	Renault; E-Tech RE22; 1.6 V6 tt	P	(United Kingdom) Luke Smith			10			18		19	13	16	14	9	13	9th
2023–24	Alpine A523	Renault; E-Tech RE23; 1.6 V6 tt	P		BHR	JED	RBR	GBR	BEL	NED	USA	MEX	BRA	LVG	QAT	UAE	11	10th
2023–24	Alpine A523	Renault; E-Tech RE23; 1.6 V6 tt	P	(Spain) Rubén Pedreño	11	15	16			17	10	10	Ret	15	7	Ret	11	10th
2023–24	Alpine A523	Renault; E-Tech RE23; 1.6 V6 tt	P	(Slovakia) Filip Prešnajder		14	15	15	18								11	10th
2023–24	Alpine A523	Renault; E-Tech RE23; 1.6 V6 tt	P	(Hungary) Patrik Sipos	15			12	17	16	9	11	18	14	13	13	11	10th
2025	Alpine A524	Renault; E-Tech RE24; 1.6 V6 tt	P		AUS	CHN	BHR	SAU	GBR	BEL	NED	USA	MXC	SAP	QAT	ABU	27	9th
2025	Alpine A524	Renault; E-Tech RE24; 1.6 V6 tt	P	(Finland) Joni Törmälä	20	10	10	Ret	15	16	6	16		8	17	11	27	9th
2025	Alpine A524	Renault; E-Tech RE24; 1.6 V6 tt	P	(United Kingdom) Josh Idowu	13	9	5	Ret	19	11	16	18	Ret	15	19	15	27	9th
2025	Alpine A524	Renault; E-Tech RE24; 1.6 V6 tt	P	(Poland) Piotr Stachulec													27	9th
2025	Alpine A524	Renault; E-Tech RE24; 1.6 V6 tt	P	(Hungary) Bence Szabo-Konyi									15				27	9th
2026	Alpine A526	Mercedes-AMG; F1 M17; 1.6 V6 tt	P		CHN	JPN	BHR	SAU	CAT	GBR	BEL	NED	USA	MXC	SAP	ABU	224	2nd
2026	Alpine A526	Mercedes-AMG; F1 M17; 1.6 V6 tt	P	(Hungary) Dani Bereznay	10	5	12	5		12	5		2	14	12	18	224	2nd
2026	Alpine A526	Mercedes-AMG; F1 M17; 1.6 V6 tt	P	(Wales) Otis Lawrence	7	1	8	**2**	**16**	**1**	4	5	1	9	**3**	5	224	2nd
2026	Alpine A526	Mercedes-AMG; F1 M17; 1.6 V6 tt	P	(United Kingdom) Josh Idowu					2			17					224	2nd

== See also ==
- Signatech – A motor racing team supported by Automobiles Alpine in the FIA World Endurance Championship.
