= Miami ePrix =

Annual car race in Miami-Dade County, Florida

- Miami International Autodrome (2026)
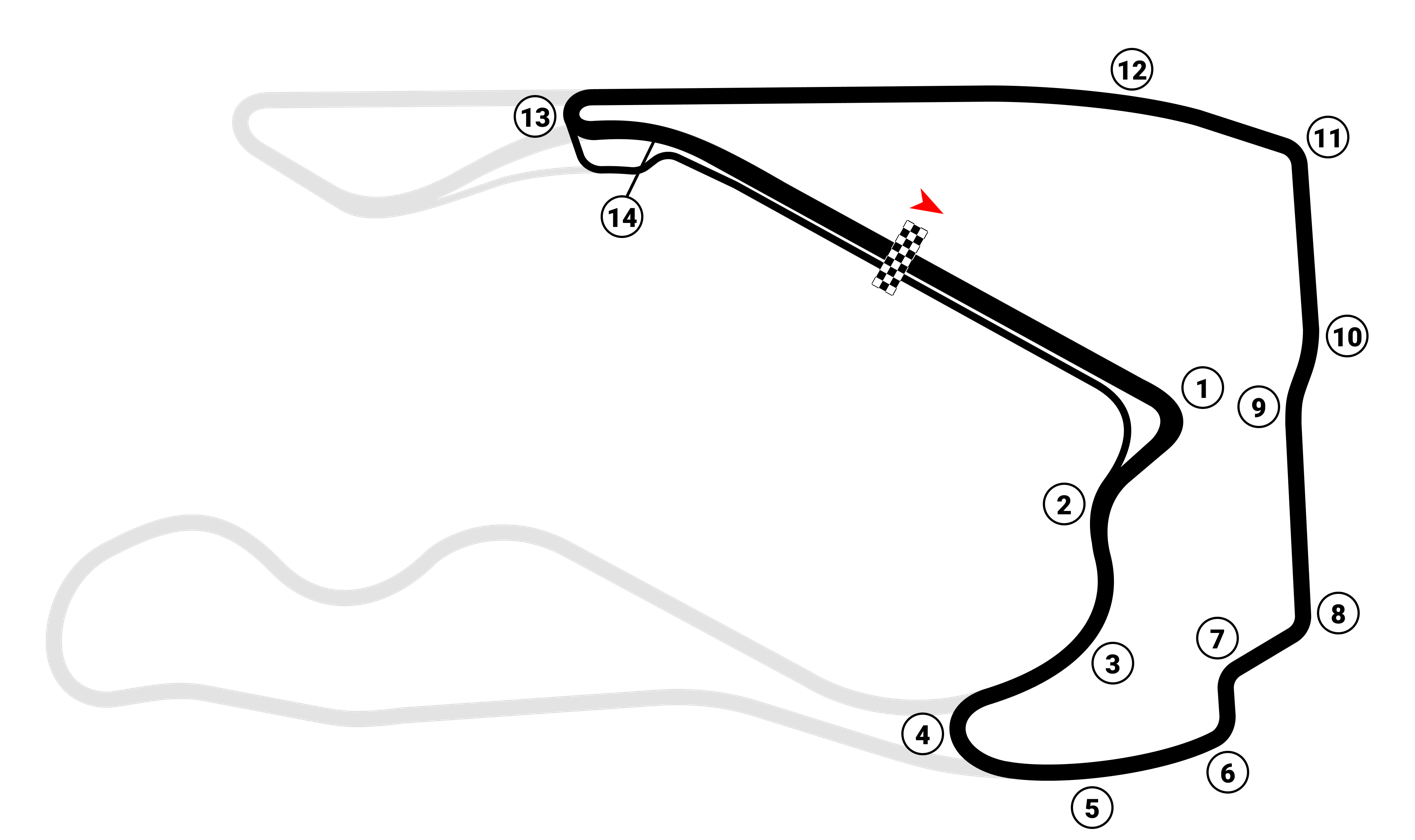

Race information
- Number of times held: 3
- First held: 2015
- Circuit length: 2.320 km (1.442 miles)

Last race (2026)

Pole position
- (Switzerland) Nico Müller; Porsche; 55.455

Podium
- 1. (New Zealand) Mitch Evans; Jaguar; 48:43.266; 2. (Switzerland) Nico Müller; Porsche; +3.151; 3. (Germany) Pascal Wehrlein; Porsche; +8.827

Fastest lap
- (United Kingdom) Oliver Rowland; Nissan; 1:02.316

The Miami ePrix is an annual race of the single-seater, electrically powered Formula E championship, held at various venues in Miami-Dade County, Florida, United States. It was first held in Biscayne Bay in the 2014–15 season, as the first race of two in the United States that year (the other being the Long Beach ePrix). It did not return to the calendar for the following season.

In June 2024, it was confirmed that the race would return in the 2024–25 season, with the venue changed to the road course of the Homestead–Miami Speedway. For the 2025–26 season the Miami ePrix moves to the Miami International Autodrome, the host of the Formula One Miami Grand Prix.

== Circuit ==
Miami ePrix was held in the Biscayne Bay Street Circuit in the 2014–15 season.

The Biscayne Bay Street Circuit was used by Formula E on March 14, 2015 for the 2015 Miami ePrix. The track was located in the heart of Downtown Miami, running along the coast of Biscayne Bay, in addition to making its way underneath the MacArthur Causeway and around the American Airlines Arena, the home of NBA basketball team Miami Heat. The ePrix was only held once at the venue, as the event was cancelled after one year for undisclosed reasons.

For the return in 2025, the race moved to a modified road course configuration of the Homestead–Miami Speedway. The layout has a tighter corner radius at Turn 1, and a left-right chicane placed on the backstretch of the speedway.

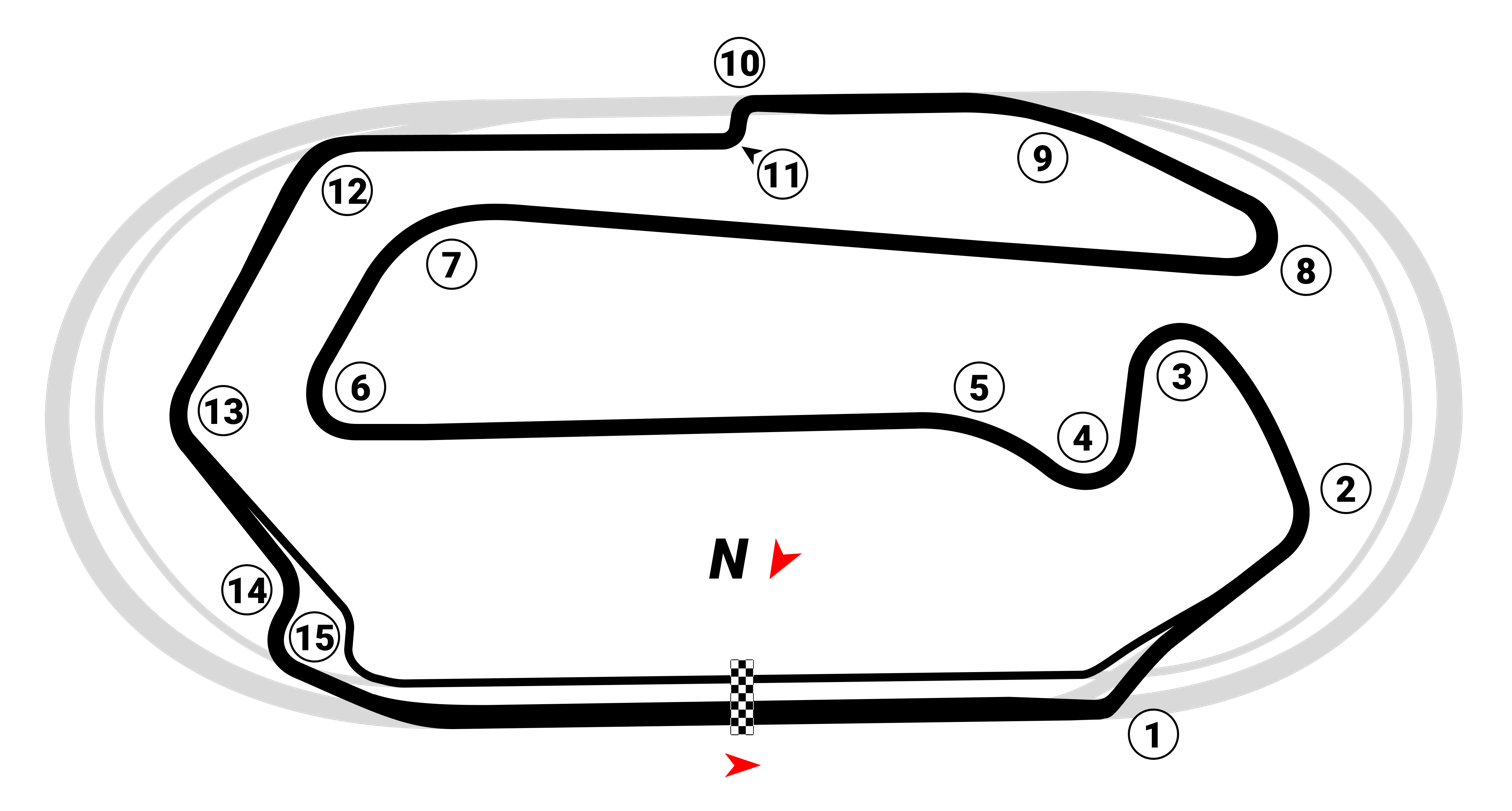
The layout of the Homestead–Miami Speedway that was used in 2025.

The Miami ePrix moved to the Miami International Autodrome in 2026, the same venue that hosts the Miami Grand Prix, using the MIA Loop layout.

== Results ==
Edition	Track	Winner	Second	Third	Pole position	Fastest lap	Ref
2015	Biscayne Bay Street Circuit	(France) Nico Prost e.dams Renault	(United States) Scott Speed; Andretti Autosport	(Germany) Daniel Abt; Abt Sportsline	(France) Jean-Éric Vergne; Andretti Autosport	(Brazil) Nelson Piquet Jr. China Racing	
2025	Homestead–Miami Speedway	(Germany) Pascal Wehrlein; Porsche	(Brazil) Lucas di Grassi; Lola Yamaha ABT	(Portugal) António Félix da Costa; Porsche	(France) Norman Nato; Nissan	(Germany) Pascal Wehrlein; Porsche	
2026	Miami International Autodrome	(New Zealand) Mitch Evans; Jaguar	(Switzerland) Nico Müller; Porsche	(Germany) Pascal Wehrlein; Porsche	(Switzerland) Nico Müller; Porsche	(United Kingdom) Oliver Rowland; Nissan	
