= 2022 Miami Grand Prix =

5th round of the 2022 Formula One season

Race 5 of 22 (Note: At the time of the event Formula One planned to hold twenty-three Grands Prix.) in the 2022 Formula One World Championship
← Previous race	Next race →
- Layout of the Miami International Autodrome

Race details
- Date: May 8, 2022
- Official name: Formula 1 Crypto.com Miami Grand Prix 2022
- Location: Miami International Autodrome, Miami Gardens, Florida
- Course: Purpose-built temporary circuit
- Course length: 5.412 km (3.363 miles)
- Distance: 57 laps, 308.326 km (191.584 miles)
- Weather: Warm, partly cloudy, slight rain at the end
- Attendance: 242,955

Pole position
Driver	(Monaco) Charles Leclerc	Ferrari
- Time: 1:28.796

Fastest lap
Driver	(Netherlands) Max Verstappen	Red Bull Racing-RBPT
- Time: 1:31.361 on lap 54

Podium
First	(Netherlands) Max Verstappen	Red Bull Racing-RBPT
Second	(Monaco) Charles Leclerc	Ferrari
Third	(Spain) Carlos Sainz Jr.	Ferrari

The 2022 Miami Grand Prix (officially known as the Formula 1 Crypto.com Miami Grand Prix 2022) was a Formula One motor race that was held on May 8, 2022, at the Miami International Autodrome in Miami Gardens, Florida. It was the first edition of the Miami Grand Prix and the fifth round of the 2022 Formula One World Championship.

The race was won by Max Verstappen, ahead of championship leader and pole-sitter Charles Leclerc in second and his teammate Carlos Sainz Jr. in third. Verstappen also set the fastest lap. The result brought Verstappen closer to Leclerc in the fight for the World Drivers' Championship, trailing the latter by just 19 points after five Grand Prix weekends. In the Constructors' Championship, Red Bull narrowed the gap to Ferrari to just six points, while Mercedes remained in third with 95 points, 62 behind Ferrari.

== Background ==
=== Championship standings before the race ===
Charles Leclerc was the Drivers' Championship leader after the fourth round, the Emilia Romagna Grand Prix, with 86 points, 27 ahead of Max Verstappen in second, with Sergio Pérez in third, five points behind Verstappen. In the Constructors' Championship, Ferrari led Red Bull Racing by 11 points and Mercedes by 47.

=== Entrants ===
The drivers and teams were the same as the season entry list with no additional stand-in drivers for the race.

=== Tyre choices ===
Tyre supplier Pirelli brought the C2, C3, and C4 tyre compounds (designated hard, medium, and soft, respectively) for teams to use at the event.

== Practice ==
There were three practice sessions, each lasted one hour. The first two practice sessions took place on Friday May 6 at 14:30 and 17:30 local time (UTC−04:00) and the third practice session took place at 13:00 on May 7. In the first session, Leclerc was the fastest ahead of George Russell and Verstappen, who had hydraulic and overheating issues. In the second session, Russell set the fastest lap ahead of Leclerc and Pérez. In the final session, Pérez was first, ahead of Leclerc and Verstappen. There was a crash and red flag in each session; in the first session, Valtteri Bottas crashed at turn 7, while Carlos Sainz Jr. and Esteban Ocon both crashed into the concrete barrier at turn 14 in the final two sessions, respectively.

== Qualifying ==
Qualifying took place on May 7 at 16:00 local time and lasted for one hour.

=== Qualifying report ===
Leclerc led Sainz for a Ferrari front-row lockout, the first since the 2019 Mexican Grand Prix. Behind them were the Red Bull drivers, Verstappen and Pérez, and Alfa Romeo's Bottas, with Lewis Hamilton, Pierre Gasly, Lando Norris, Yuki Tsunoda, and Lance Stroll completing the top ten; Russell, Hamilton's Mercedes teammate, did not make the Q3. In his final Q3 lap, Verstappen made a mistake, which he blamed on his lack of knowledge of the car on the track, while both Leclerc and Sainz improved their fastest lap to take the front row.

=== Qualifying classification ===
Pos.	No.	Driver	Constructor	Qualifying times			Final grid
Pos.	No.	Driver	Constructor	Q1	Q2	Q3	Final grid
1	16	(Monaco) Charles Leclerc	Ferrari	1:29.474	1:29.130	1:28.796	1
2	55	(Spain) Carlos Sainz Jr.	Ferrari	1:30.079	1:29.729	1:28.986	2
3	1	(Netherlands) Max Verstappen	Red Bull Racing-RBPT	1:29.836	1:29.202	1:28.991	3
4	11	(Mexico) Sergio Pérez	Red Bull Racing-RBPT	1:30.055	1:29.673	1:29.036	4
5	77	(Finland) Valtteri Bottas	Alfa Romeo-Ferrari	1:30.845	1:29.751	1:29.475	5
6	44	(United Kingdom) Lewis Hamilton	Mercedes	1:30.388	1:29.797	1:29.625	6
7	10	(France) Pierre Gasly	AlphaTauri-RBPT	1:30.779	1:30.128	1:29.690	7
8	4	(United Kingdom) Lando Norris	McLaren-Mercedes	1:30.761	1:29.634	1:29.750	8
9	22	(Japan) Yuki Tsunoda	AlphaTauri-RBPT	1:30.485	1:30.031	1:29.932	9
10	18	(Canada) Lance Stroll	Aston Martin Aramco-Mercedes	1:30.441	1:29.996	1:30.676	10
11	14	(Spain) Fernando Alonso	Alpine-Renault	1:30.407	1:30.160	N/A	11
12	63	(United Kingdom) George Russell	Mercedes	1:30.490	1:30.173	N/A	12
13	5	(Germany) Sebastian Vettel	Aston Martin Aramco-Mercedes	1:30.677	1:30.214	N/A	13
14	3	(Australia) Daniel Ricciardo	McLaren-Mercedes	1:30.583	1:30.310	N/A	14
15	47	(Germany) Mick Schumacher	Haas-Ferrari	1:30.645	1:30.423	N/A	15
16	20	(Denmark) Kevin Magnussen	Haas-Ferrari	1:30.975	N/A	N/A	16
17	24	(China) Zhou Guanyu	Alfa Romeo-Ferrari	1:31.020	N/A	N/A	17
18	23	(Thailand) Alexander Albon	Williams-Mercedes	1:31.266	N/A	N/A	18
19	6	(Canada) Nicholas Latifi	Williams-Mercedes	1:31.325	N/A	N/A	19
107% time: 1:35.737
—	31	(France) Esteban Ocon	Alpine-Renault	No time	N/A	N/A	20^{1}

Notes

- ^1 – Esteban Ocon did not take part in qualifying due to an accident during the third practice session. He was permitted to race at the stewards' discretion.

== Race ==
The race started at 15:30 EDT (UTC−4) on May 8 and lasted 57 laps. Stroll and Vettel, who respectively qualified 10th and 13th, started the race from the pit lane after a fuel temperature issue.

=== Race report ===
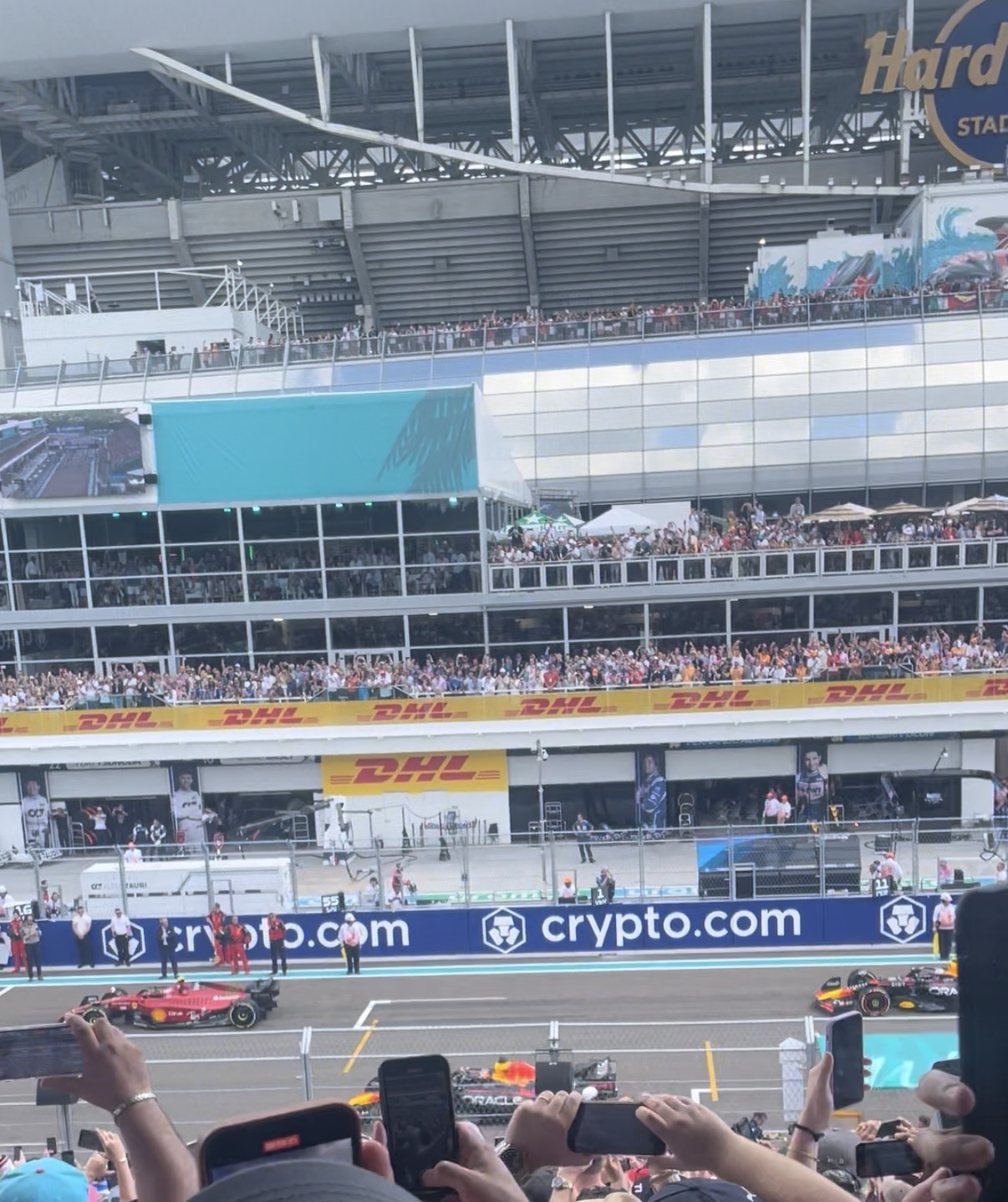
The 2022 Miami Grand Prix as the lights go out

In the first corner at the start, Verstappen overtook Sainz for second place and closed in on Leclerc, whom he passed for the lead on lap 9, as Leclerc struggled with the medium compound tyres. The race was interrupted on lap 41, as Norris's rear right tyre made contact with Gasly's front left, triggering a virtual safety car and then a safety car for five laps. Verstappen was pressured from Leclerc at the restart, and defended his position to take the win. On lap 52, Verstappen's teammate, Pérez, attempted to overtake Sainz into turn 1 but made a mistake and locked up. Vettel and Schumacher collided on lap 53, but no action was taken. Leclerc and Sainz finished second and third, respectively, while Pérez, who had temporarily suffered engine issues that cost him about 30 horsepower finished fourth, and Russell made up the top five.

After the race, Alonso was given two separate five-second penalties, which dropped him out of the top 10 for points, with Stroll promoted to 10th. Magnussen had two separate incidents following the restart with Stroll, retiring on the last lap; he was classified 16th as he completed more than 90% of the race distance.

=== Race classification ===
Pos.	No.	Driver	Constructor	Laps	Time/Retired	Grid	Points
1	1	(Netherlands) Max Verstappen	Red Bull Racing-RBPT	57	1:34:24.258	3	26^{a}
2	16	(Monaco) Charles Leclerc	Ferrari	57	+3.786	1	18
3	55	(Spain) Carlos Sainz Jr.	Ferrari	57	+8.229	2	15
4	11	(Mexico) Sergio Pérez	Red Bull Racing-RBPT	57	+10.638	4	12
5	63	(United Kingdom) George Russell	Mercedes	57	+18.582	12	10
6	44	(United Kingdom) Lewis Hamilton	Mercedes	57	+21.368	6	8
7	77	(Finland) Valtteri Bottas	Alfa Romeo-Ferrari	57	+25.073	5	6
8	31	(France) Esteban Ocon	Alpine-Renault	57	+28.386	20	4
9	23	(Thailand) Alexander Albon	Williams-Mercedes	57	+32.365	18	2
10	18	(Canada) Lance Stroll	Aston Martin Aramco-Mercedes	57	+37.026	PL^{b}	1
11	14	(Spain) Fernando Alonso	Alpine-Renault	57	+37.128^{c}	11	
12	22	(Japan) Yuki Tsunoda	AlphaTauri-RBPT	57	+40.146	9	
13	3	(Australia) Daniel Ricciardo	McLaren-Mercedes	57	+40.902^{d}	14	
14	6	(Canada) Nicholas Latifi	Williams-Mercedes	57	+49.936	19	
15	47	(Germany) Mick Schumacher	Haas-Ferrari	57	+1:13.305	15	
16^{e}	20	(Denmark) Kevin Magnussen	Haas-Ferrari	56	Front wing^{f}	16	
17^{e}	5	(Germany) Sebastian Vettel	Aston Martin Aramco-Mercedes	54	Collision damage	PL^{b}	
Ret	10	(France) Pierre Gasly	AlphaTauri-RBPT	45	Suspension	7	
Ret	4	(United Kingdom) Lando Norris	McLaren-Mercedes	39	Collision	8	
Ret	24	(China) Zhou Guanyu	Alfa Romeo-Ferrari	6	Water leak	17	
Fastest lap: (Netherlands) Max Verstappen (Red Bull Racing-RBPT) – 1:31.361 (lap 54)

Notes

- ^a – Includes one point for fastest lap.
- ^b – Lance Stroll and Sebastian Vettel qualified 10th and 13th, respectively, but they started the race from the pit lane as the fuel in their car was below the mandated minimum temperature. Their places on the grid were left vacant.
- ^c – Fernando Alonso finished 8th, but he received two five-second time penalties. The first for causing a collision with Pierre Gasly and the second for leaving the track and gaining an advantage.
- ^d – Daniel Ricciardo finished 11th, but he received a five-second time penalty for leaving the track and gaining an advantage.
- ^e – Kevin Magnussen and Sebastian Vettel were classified as they completed more than 90% of the race distance.
- ^f – Kevin Magnussen received a five-second time penalty for causing a collision with Lance Stroll. His final position was not affected by the penalty.

== Championship standings after the race ==
Drivers' Championship standings

Pos.	Driver	Points
1	(Monaco) Charles Leclerc	104
2	(Netherlands) Max Verstappen	85
3	(Mexico) Sergio Pérez	66
4	(United Kingdom) George Russell	59
5	(Spain) Carlos Sainz Jr.	53

Constructors' Championship standings

Pos.	Constructor	Points
1	(Italy) Ferrari	157
2	(Austria) Red Bull Racing-RBPT	151
3	(Germany) Mercedes	95
4	(United Kingdom) McLaren-Mercedes	46
5	(Switzerland) Alfa Romeo-Ferrari	31

- Note: Only the top five positions are included for both sets of standings.

== See also ==
- 2022 W Series Miami round

== Notes ==
Previous race: 2022 Emilia Romagna Grand Prix	FIA Formula One World Championship; 2022 season	Next race: 2022 Spanish Grand Prix
Previous race: None	Miami Grand Prix	Next race: 2023 Miami Grand Prix
