= 2026 Miami Grand Prix =

Formula One motor race

Race 4 of 23 (Note: At the time of the event Formula One planned to hold twenty-two Grands Prix.) in the 2026 Formula One World Championship
← Previous race	Next race →
- Layout of the Miami International Autodrome

Race details
- Date: May 3, 2026
- Official name: Formula 1 Crypto.com Miami Grand Prix 2026
- Location: Miami International Autodrome, Miami Gardens, Florida, US
- Course: Purpose-built temporary circuit
- Course length: 5.412 km (3.363 miles)
- Distance: 57 laps, 308.326 km (191.584 miles)
- Weather: Cloudy. Max. ambient temp. 28°C, max. track temp. 42.3°C.

Pole position
Driver	(Italy) Kimi Antonelli	Mercedes
- Time: 1:27.798

Fastest lap
Driver	(United Kingdom) Lando Norris	McLaren-Mercedes
- Time: 1:31.869 on lap 35

Podium
First	(Italy) Kimi Antonelli	Mercedes
Second	(United Kingdom) Lando Norris	McLaren-Mercedes
Third	(Australia) Oscar Piastri	McLaren-Mercedes

The 2026 Miami Grand Prix (officially known as the Formula 1 Crypto.com Miami Grand Prix 2026) was a Formula One motor race that was held on May 3, 2026, at the Miami International Autodrome in Miami Gardens, Florida, United States. It was the fourth round of the 2026 Formula One World Championship and the second of six Grands Prix in the season to utilise the sprint format.

Lando Norris (McLaren) converted pole position for the sprint event to a victory ahead of teammate Oscar Piastri and Charles Leclerc (Ferrari). Kimi Antonelli (Mercedes) then converted pole position for the Grand Prix to a win, Norris and Piastri completed the podium.

== Background ==
The event was held at the Miami International Autodrome in Miami Gardens, Florida, for the fifth time in the circuit's history, across the weekend of May 1–3. The Grand Prix was the fourth round of the 2026 Formula One World Championship and the fifth running of the Miami Grand Prix. It was also the second of six Grands Prix in the season to utilize the sprint format and the third time overall that the Miami Grand Prix has featured it.

The Bahrain and Saudi Arabian Grands Prix, which had been scheduled to immediately precede the Miami Grand Prix, did not take place on their original April dates due to the 2026 Iran war. The resulting break in the season was used to introduce changes to the technical regulations, predominately around the power unit.

McLaren, Ferrari and Red Bull Racing entered the weekend with notable upgrade packages.

=== Championship standings before the race ===
Mercedes's Kimi Antonelli, who won the previous round in Japan, entered the round as the leader of the Drivers' Championship. With 72 points, Antonelli led his teammate George Russell by nine points, with third-placed Charles Leclerc (Ferrari) a further fourteen points behind. Mercedes entered the round as the leader of the Constructors' Championship with 135 points. They led Ferrari by 45 points, and third-placed McLaren by a further 45 points.

=== Entrants ===
The drivers and teams were the same as the season entry list with no additional stand-in drivers for the race.

=== Tyre choices ===
Tyre supplier Pirelli brought the C3, C4, and C5 tyre compounds (the three softest in their range) for teams to use at the event.

== Practice ==
The sole free practice session was held on May 1, 2026, at 12:00 local time (UTC–4), and was topped by Charles Leclerc (Ferrari) ahead of Max Verstappen (Red Bull) and Oscar Piastri (McLaren). The session was extended from 60 to 90 minutes after rule changes were implemented during the April break.

== Sprint qualifying ==
Sprint qualifying was held on May 1, 2026, at 16:30 local time (UTC–4), and determined the starting grid order for the sprint.

=== Sprint qualifying report ===
Sprint qualifying consisted of three sessions, with the six slowest drivers eliminated after each of the first two segments. Medium tyres were mandatory in first two segments (SQ1 and SQ2), while the final segment (SQ3) was run on soft tyres.

In SQ1, most drivers left the pits shortly after the session began. The early part of the segment was led by Ferrari, before Lando Norris (McLaren) moved to the top of the times late in the session. Lance Stroll (Aston Martin) caused a brief yellow-flag period after locking up and going off at Turn 17, but was able to return to the pits; he did not set a time. Norris finished the segment fastest ahead of Leclerc and Oscar Piastri (McLaren). The final laps in SQ1 left Liam Lawson (Racing Bulls), Esteban Ocon (Haas), Sergio Pérez and Valtteri Bottas (both Cadillac), and the Aston Martin pair of Fernando Alonso and Stroll in the elimination zone. Lawson and Ocon both failed to progress after troubled laps, while Alonso recorded a slow time after a compromised run and Stroll remained without a time after his earlier off-track moment. The elimination of Pérez and Bottas left both Cadillac cars out in the first part of qualifying on the team's first home Grand Prix weekend.

SQ2 began with the remaining cars queueing in the pit lane as drivers tried to find clear track. Leclerc set the pace with a lap of 1:28.333, ahead of Piastri and Hamilton. Norris, who had topped SQ1, was seventh in SQ2 after a wayward moment through the middle sector, while Antonelli also reported brake-locking issues during the segment. Gabriel Bortoleto and Nico Hülkenberg (both Audi), Oliver Bearman (Haas), Alexander Albon and Carlos Sainz Jr. (both Williams), and Arvid Lindblad (Racing Bulls) were initially the six drivers eliminated in SQ2. Bortoleto missed the final SQ3 place by 0.021 seconds, while Sainz voiced frustration over Williams' lack of pace, saying over team radio that the car was "three steps behind" where it needed to be. After sprint qualifying, however, Albon's SQ1 lap time was deleted for exceeding track limits. Because that lap had been the time which allowed him to advance from SQ1, all of his SQ2 times were also deleted and he was classified 19th, behind the drivers originally eliminated in SQ1.

SQ3 lasted eight minutes and was effectively reduced to a single-lap shootout, with all ten cars remaining in their garages during the opening minutes before heading out together in hot conditions. Russell initially went quickest before Norris set a lap of 1:27.869, the only time below 1 minute 28 seconds. Leclerc, who had looked competitive in the first two segments, lost time after a mistake on his lap and finished fourth. Piastri moved into second before Antonelli, one of the last drivers to complete a timed lap, split the McLarens by taking second place, 0.222 seconds behind Norris. Piastri finished third, 0.239 seconds off pole, ahead of Leclerc and Verstappen. Norris' result gave McLaren its first pole position of the season and ended Mercedes' run of taking every pole position or sprint pole across the opening rounds of the season.

After the session, Norris credited McLaren's upgrade package for improving the car's grip and described the pole as a reward for the team's work. Russell said he was surprised by the size of the performance gains made by McLaren and Ferrari, while several reports noted that Mercedes had been unable to match the pace of the upgraded McLaren over one lap in the hot conditions.

=== Sprint qualifying classification ===
Pos.	No.	Driver	Constructor	Qualifying times			Sprint grid
Pos.	No.	Driver	Constructor	SQ1	SQ2	SQ3	Sprint grid
1	1	(United Kingdom) Lando Norris	McLaren-Mercedes	1:28.723	1:29.366	1:27.869	1
2	12	(Italy) Kimi Antonelli	Mercedes	1:29.312	1:29.209	1:28.091	2
3	81	(Australia) Oscar Piastri	McLaren-Mercedes	1:29.169	1:28.506	1:28.108	3
4	16	(Monaco) Charles Leclerc	Ferrari	1:28.733	1:28.333	1:28.239	4
5	3	(Netherlands) Max Verstappen	Red Bull Racing-Red Bull Ford	1:29.801	1:29.093	1:28.461	5
6	63	(United Kingdom) George Russell	Mercedes	1:29.659	1:28.903	1:28.493	6
7	44	(United Kingdom) Lewis Hamilton	Ferrari	1:29.255	1:28.841	1:28.618	7
8	43	(Argentina) Franco Colapinto	Alpine-Mercedes	1:30.386	1:29.527	1:29.320	8
9	6	(France) Isack Hadjar	Red Bull Racing-Red Bull Ford	1:30.352	1:29.750	1:29.422	9
10	10	(France) Pierre Gasly	Alpine-Mercedes	1:29.984	1:29.973	1:29.474	10
11	5	(Brazil) Gabriel Bortoleto	Audi	1:30.561	1:29.994	N/A	11
12	27	(Germany) Nico Hülkenberg	Audi	1:30.270	1:30.019	N/A	12
13	87	(United Kingdom) Oliver Bearman	Haas-Ferrari	1:30.614	1:30.116	N/A	13
14	55	(Spain) Carlos Sainz Jr.	Atlassian Williams-Mercedes	1:30.987	1:30.224	N/A	14
15	41	(United Kingdom) Arvid Lindblad	Racing Bulls-Red Bull Ford	1:30.872	1:30.573	N/A	PL^{a}
16	30	(New Zealand) Liam Lawson	Racing Bulls-Red Bull Ford	1:31.043	N/A	N/A	15^{b}
17	31	(France) Esteban Ocon	Haas-Ferrari	1:31.245	N/A	N/A	16
18	11	(Mexico) Sergio Pérez	Cadillac-Ferrari	1:31.255	N/A	N/A	17
19	23	(Thailand) Alexander Albon	Atlassian Williams-Mercedes	1:31.322	N/A	N/A	18^{b}
20	77	(Finland) Valtteri Bottas	Cadillac-Ferrari	1:31.826	N/A	N/A	19
107% time: 1:34.933
—	14	(Spain) Fernando Alonso	Aston Martin Aramco-Honda	1:41.311	N/A	N/A	20^{c}
—	18	(Canada) Lance Stroll	Aston Martin Aramco-Honda	No time	N/A	N/A	21^{d}

Notes

- ^a – Arvid Lindblad qualified 15th, but was required to start the sprint from the pit lane as his car was modified under parc fermé conditions.
- ^b – Alexander Albon provisionally set a lap time in SQ1 quick enough to advance to SQ2, resulting in Liam Lawson being eliminated following SQ1. In SQ2 Albon set a lap time quick enough for 14th. Following the end of sprint qualifying, Albon's lap time from SQ1 was deleted, for track limits violations, leaving him 19th. As a result, his subsequent SQ2 time was also deleted, as Albon did not set a lap time quick enough to advance to that session.
- ^c – Fernando Alonso failed to set a time within the 107% requirement. He was permitted to race in the sprint at the stewards' discretion.
- ^d – Lance Stroll failed to set a time during sprint qualifying. He was permitted to race in the sprint at the stewards' discretion.

== Sprint ==
The sprint was held on May 2, 2026, at 12:00 local time (UTC–4), and was run for 19 laps.

=== Sprint report ===
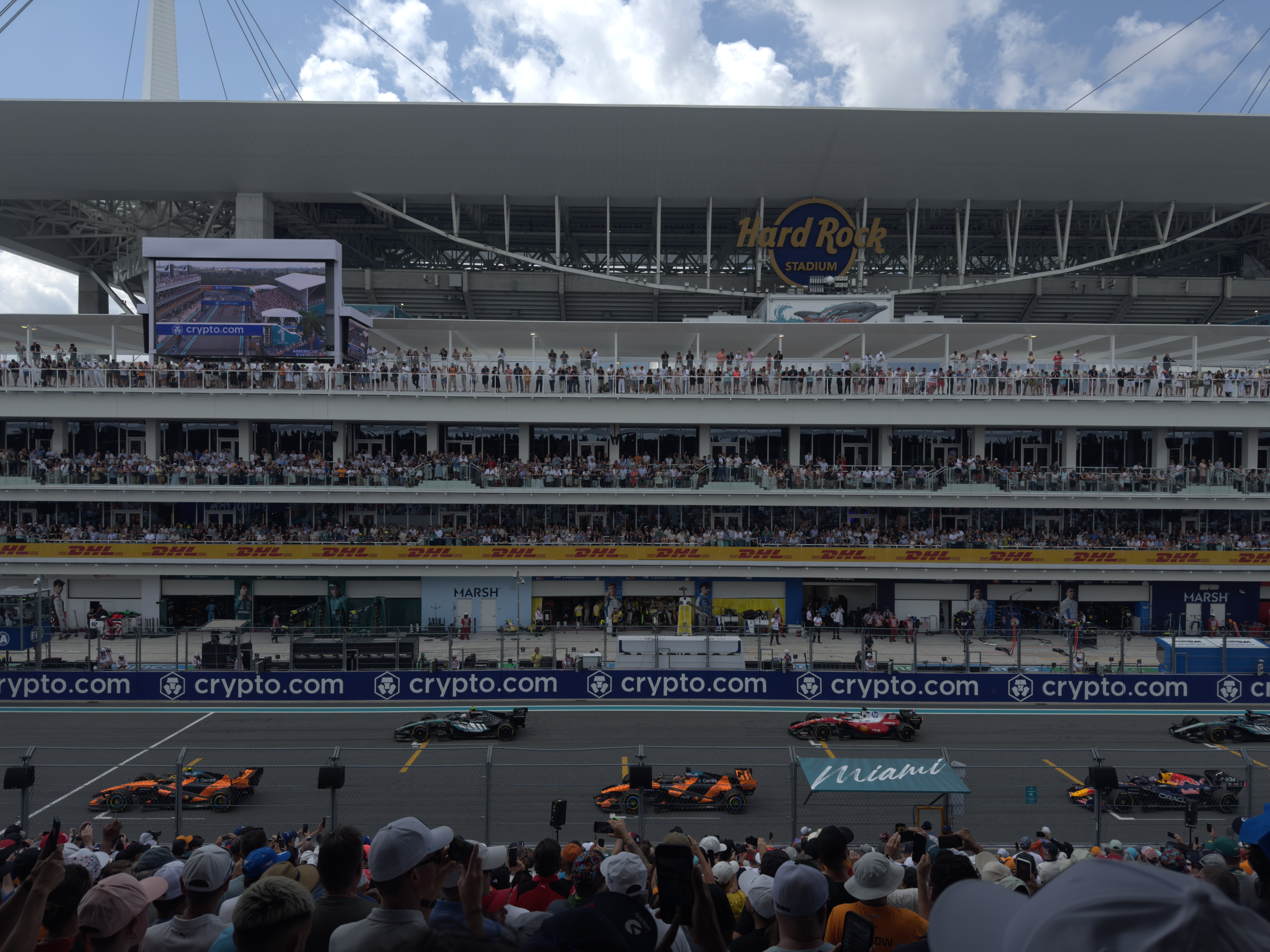
The grid lining up for the 2026 Miami Grand Prix Sprint

The sprint took place after McLaren had ended Mercedes' unbeaten run of pole positions and sprint poles at the start of the 2026 season. Before the sprint, the starting grid was altered by post-sprint qualifying penalties: Alexander Albon dropped to 18th after his SQ1 time was deleted for a track-limits breach, while Arvid Lindblad was required to start from the pit lane after Racing Bulls breached parc fermé rules by not covering his car in time. Further disruption occurred before the start when Nico Hülkenberg was unable to take the start after his Audi stopped on the way to the grid with smoke and flames from the rear of the car. His place on the grid was left vacant. Lindblad, who had already been due to start from the pit lane, also failed to take the start after Racing Bulls detected a technical issue with his car. A minute's silence was held on the grid before the start in memory of former Formula One driver and Paralympic champion Alex Zanardi, who had died the previous day. Of the remaining 20 starters, most chose the medium compound tyres, while both Aston Martin drivers selected soft tyres and both Cadillac drivers started on hard tyres.

At the start, pole-sitter Lando Norris (McLaren) kept the lead into Turn 1, while Kimi Antonelli (Mercedes) made a poor start from second place and fell behind Oscar Piastri (McLaren) and Charles Leclerc (Ferrari). George Russell also drew close to his Mercedes teammate, but Antonelli held fourth through the opening sequence of corners. Behind them, Lewis Hamilton (Ferrari) and Max Verstappen (Red Bull Racing) made contact, with Verstappen initially losing out to Hamilton as the field completed the opening lap. The Alpines of Pierre Gasly and Franco Colapinto ran in the lower points positions, while Gabriel Bortoleto, in the sole remaining Audi, moved ahead of Isack Hadjar in the early laps. Norris began to build an advantage over Piastri during the opening laps, while Leclerc remained within range of the second McLaren. Behind the top three, Antonelli came under pressure from Russell after failing to recover the positions he had lost at the start. Leclerc criticised Antonelli's defensive driving over team radio while attempting to challenge him. At the end of lap 7, Russell used the slipstream along the back straight to pass Antonelli into turn 17 for fourth place, before Antonelli retook the position on the following lap with a move under braking into turn 11. Hamilton and Verstappen continued their battle behind the Mercedes pair. Verstappen overtook Hamilton by running wide beyond the track limits between turns 11 and 12 and was told to give the position back. After returning the place, Verstappen attacked again and completed a legal move into turn 17. Esteban Ocon's Haas shed bodywork during the race, while Albon made a late stop for a front-wing change and dropped to the rear of the classified finishers. In the closing laps, Norris remained clear of Piastri and controlled the race from the front. Piastri came under pressure from Leclerc, but Leclerc lost time after running wide late in the race and was unable to challenge for second. Norris won 3.766 seconds ahead of Piastri, giving McLaren a 1–2 finish and its first victory of the 2026 season. Leclerc completed the podium in third, while Antonelli crossed the line fourth ahead of Russell, Verstappen, Hamilton and Gasly. The result ended Mercedes' perfect winning start to the 2026 season and was described by several outlets as evidence that McLaren's upgrade package had moved the team back into front-running contention.

After the race, Antonelli was given a five-second time penalty for repeated track-limits infringements, having already received a black-and-white flag during the sprint. The penalty dropped him from fourth to sixth, promoting Russell to fourth and Verstappen to fifth. Hamilton was classified seventh, while Gasly took the final point in eighth for Alpine. The result saw Antonelli's championship lead reduced to seven points. Bortoleto originally finished 11th on the road, but was later disqualified after his Audi was found to have breached the technical regulations relating to engine intake air pressure. Audi stated that the pressure breach had occurred when temperatures rose higher than expected, but the stewards ruled that the car was required to comply with the regulations at all times.

=== Sprint classification ===
Pos.	No.	Driver	Constructor	Laps	Time/Retired	Grid	Points
1	1	(United Kingdom) Lando Norris	McLaren-Mercedes	19	29:15.045	1	8
2	81	(Australia) Oscar Piastri	McLaren-Mercedes	19	+3.766	3	7
3	16	(Monaco) Charles Leclerc	Ferrari	19	+6.251	4	6
4	63	(United Kingdom) George Russell	Mercedes	19	+12.951	6	5
5	3	(Netherlands) Max Verstappen	Red Bull Racing-Red Bull Ford	19	+13.639	5	4
6	12	(Italy) Kimi Antonelli	Mercedes	19	+13.777	2	3
7	44	(United Kingdom) Lewis Hamilton	Ferrari	19	+21.665	7	2
8	10	(France) Pierre Gasly	Alpine-Mercedes	19	+30.525	10	1
9	6	(France) Isack Hadjar	Red Bull Racing-Red Bull Ford	19	+35.346	9	
10	43	(Argentina) Franco Colapinto	Alpine-Mercedes	19	+36.970	8	
11	31	(France) Esteban Ocon	Haas-Ferrari	19	+56.972	16	
12	87	(United Kingdom) Oliver Bearman	Haas-Ferrari	19	+57.365	13	
13	55	(Spain) Carlos Sainz Jr.	Atlassian Williams-Mercedes	19	+58.504	14	
14	30	(New Zealand) Liam Lawson	Racing Bulls-Red Bull Ford	19	+59.358	15	
15	14	(Spain) Fernando Alonso	Aston Martin Aramco-Honda	19	+1:16.067	20	
16	11	(Mexico) Sergio Pérez	Cadillac-Ferrari	19	+1:16.691	17	
17	18	(Canada) Lance Stroll	Aston Martin Aramco-Honda	19	+1:17.626	21	
18	23	(Thailand) Alexander Albon	Atlassian Williams-Mercedes	19	+1:28.173	18	
19	77	(Finland) Valtteri Bottas	Cadillac-Ferrari	19	+1.29.597	19	
DNS	27	(Germany) Nico Hülkenberg	Audi	0	Engine	—^{a}	
DNS	41	(United Kingdom) Arvid Lindblad	Racing Bulls-Red Bull Ford	0	Engine	—^{a}	
DSQ	5	(Brazil) Gabriel Bortoleto	Audi	19	Engine intake^{b}	11	

Notes

- ^a – Nico Hülkenberg and Arvid Lindblad did not start the sprint. Hülkenberg's place on the grid was left vacant, while Lindblad was due to start from the pit lane.
- ^b – Gabriel Bortoleto originally finished 11th, but was disqualified for a technical infringement.

== Qualifying ==
Qualifying was held on May 2, 2026, at 16:00 local time (UTC−4), and determined the starting grid order for the main race.

=== Qualifying report ===
McLaren entered Grand Prix qualifying as one of the leading contenders after Lando Norris had converted sprint pole into victory earlier in the day, with team-mate Oscar Piastri completing a McLaren one-two. With Mercedes' rivals appearing closer than in the opening rounds, qualifying was expected to be contested by all four leading teams: Mercedes, McLaren, Red Bull and Ferrari.

The opening segment (Q1) took place in hot conditions at the Miami International Autodrome, with most drivers starting on used soft tyres. Max Verstappen set the early benchmark for Red Bull with a 1:29.099, ahead of Norris, before Antonelli moved up the order and later set a 1:28.653 to top Q1 by more than four tenths of a second. Piastri, who completed his Q1 runs on used tyres, was at risk of elimination late in the session but narrowly progressed in sixteenth place when Arvid Lindblad (Racing Bulls) failed to improve sufficiently. Further back, both Aston Martin drivers and both Cadillac drivers struggled for pace, while Gabriel Bortoleto (Audi) completed only three laps before a brake fire forced him to stop on track. Lindblad, Fernando Alonso, Lance Stroll, Valtteri Bottas, Sergio Pérez, and Bortoleto were eliminated.

The segment (Q2) was delayed briefly while Bortoleto's stricken Audi was recovered. Red Bull sent its cars out early, but Verstappen initially complained about his tyres. Norris had a difficult start to the session, abandoning a lap after a snap at turn 6 and later reporting problems that McLaren attributed to a boost issue, although he recovered enough to reach Q3 (the third and final segment of qualifying). Antonelli and Lewis Hamilton were among the early pace-setters, while George Russell matched Hamilton's time to put both Mercedes cars inside the top three at that stage. Verstappen then improved to a 1:28.116 to top the segment ahead of Antonelli and Charles Leclerc, while Franco Colapinto and Pierre Gasly both reached Q3 for Alpine. Colapinto's result was his first Q3 appearance since the 2024 Azerbaijan Grand Prix and his first with Alpine. Nico Hülkenberg, Liam Lawson, Oliver Bearman, Carlos Sainz Jr., Esteban Ocon, and Alexander Albon missed out on Q3 on track.

Q3 began slowly as drivers waited for faster track conditions. Norris set the first representative benchmark before Verstappen beat him by 0.002 seconds, after which Leclerc briefly moved to the top of the timesheets. Antonelli then produced a 1:27.798 on his first Q3 run, the fastest lap of the weekend to that point and the first lap of the weekend faster than Norris's sprint qualifying pole time from Friday. The lap left him more than three tenths clear of the field after the first runs, with Verstappen, Leclerc, Norris, and Russell separated by a small margin behind him. Antonelli failed to improve on his final attempt after making an error at the first corner, but none of his rivals could beat his earlier time. Verstappen improved late to take second place, 0.166 seconds behind Antonelli, while Leclerc qualified third and Norris fourth. Antonelli's pole was his third consecutive Grand Prix pole position and continued Mercedes' run of Grand Prix pole positions at the start of the 2026 season. He also became the third driver, after Ayrton Senna and Michael Schumacher, to take the first three Grand Prix pole positions of his Formula One career in consecutive events.

After qualifying, Hadjar was referred to the stewards following post-session scrutineering. The stewards found that sections of the left- and right-hand side floorboard on his Red Bull protruded 2 mm outside the permitted reference volume, which was deemed a technical non-conformity. He was disqualified from qualifying, although he was permitted to start the race because he had set satisfactory practice times. Red Bull subsequently changed power unit elements and the control electronics unit under parc fermé conditions, requiring Hadjar to start from the pit lane. As a result, Hülkenberg was promoted into the top ten on the final starting grid, which began with Antonelli, Verstappen, Leclerc, and Norris on the first two rows, followed by Russell, Hamilton, Piastri, Colapinto, Gasly, and Hülkenberg.

=== Qualifying classification ===
Pos.	No.	Driver	Constructor	Qualifying times			Final grid
Pos.	No.	Driver	Constructor	Q1	Q2	Q3	Final grid
1	12	(Italy) Kimi Antonelli	Mercedes	1:28.653	1:28.289	1:27.798	1
2	3	(Netherlands) Max Verstappen	Red Bull Racing-Red Bull Ford	1:29.099	1:28.116	1:27.964	2
3	16	(Monaco) Charles Leclerc	Ferrari	1:28.938	1:28.315	1:28.143	3
4	1	(United Kingdom) Lando Norris	McLaren-Mercedes	1:29.183	1:28.920	1:28.183	4
5	63	(United Kingdom) George Russell	Mercedes	1:29.492	1:28.477	1:28.197	5
6	44	(United Kingdom) Lewis Hamilton	Ferrari	1:29.483	1:28.477	1:28.319	6
7	81	(Australia) Oscar Piastri	McLaren-Mercedes	1:29.920	1:28.332	1:28.500	7
8	43	(Argentina) Franco Colapinto	Alpine-Mercedes	1:29.584	1:28.975	1:28.762	8
9	10	(France) Pierre Gasly	Alpine-Mercedes	1:29.914	1:29.070	1:28.810	9
10	27	(Germany) Nico Hülkenberg	Audi	1:29.645	1:29.439	N/A	10
11	30	(New Zealand) Liam Lawson	Racing Bulls-Red Bull Ford	1:29.595	1:29.499	N/A	11
12	87	(United Kingdom) Oliver Bearman	Haas-Ferrari	1:29.340	1:29.567	N/A	12
13	55	(Spain) Carlos Sainz Jr.	Atlassian Williams-Mercedes	1:29.540	1:29.568	N/A	13
14	31	(France) Esteban Ocon	Haas-Ferrari	1:29.838	1:29.772	N/A	14
15	23	(Thailand) Alexander Albon	Atlassian Williams-Mercedes	1:29.720	1:29.946	N/A	15
16	41	(United Kingdom) Arvid Lindblad	Racing Bulls-Red Bull Ford	1:30.133	N/A	N/A	16
17	14	(Spain) Fernando Alonso	Aston Martin Aramco-Honda	1:31.098	N/A	N/A	17
18	18	(Canada) Lance Stroll	Aston Martin Aramco-Honda	1:31.164	N/A	N/A	18
19	77	(Finland) Valtteri Bottas	Cadillac-Ferrari	1:31.629	N/A	N/A	19
20	11	(Mexico) Sergio Pérez	Cadillac-Ferrari	1:31.967	N/A	N/A	20
21	5	(Brazil) Gabriel Bortoleto	Audi	1:33.737	N/A	N/A	21
DSQ	6	(France) Isack Hadjar	Red Bull Racing-Red Bull Ford	1:29.324	1:28.941	1:28.789	PL^{a}
107% time: 1:34.858

Notes

- ^a – Isack Hadjar qualified ninth, but was disqualified for a technical infringement. He was allowed to race at the stewards' discretion and started from the pit lane as his car was modified under parc fermé conditions.

== Race ==
The race was held on May 3, 2026, and was scheduled to start at 16:00 local time (UTC–4) before being pushed up to 13:00 due to the threat of heavy rainstorms. It was run for 57 laps.

=== Race report ===
The race began after the start time had been moved forward by three hours because of the threat of heavy rainstorms later in the afternoon. Although rain had fallen earlier on Sunday, the track was dry by the time the race began, with all drivers starting on medium tyres except Isack Hadjar, who started from the pit lane on hard tyres after being disqualified from qualifying and then having his car modified under parc fermé conditions.

At the start, polesitter Kimi Antonelli was challenged on one side by Max Verstappen and on the other by Charles Leclerc. Antonelli and Verstappen both locked up into the first corner, with Verstappen making contact with Leclerc and spining, dropping down the order. Leclerc emerged in the lead, ahead of Antonelli and the two McLaren drivers, Lando Norris and Oscar Piastri. Further back, Lewis Hamilton and Franco Colapinto made contact at turn 11, which left debris on the track and damaged Hamilton's Ferrari; the stewards investigated the incident but took no further action.

The lead changed hands repeatedly in the opening laps. George Russell passed Piastri for fourth by lap 3, while Verstappen began recovering from his spin. Antonelli overtook Leclerc for the lead at turn 17 on lap 4, and Leclerc repassed him on the following lap. Norris then moved past Antonelli for second, before the race was neutralised by two separate incidents. Hadjar hit the wall at the turn 14 chicane and retired, while Liam Lawson's Racing Bulls went into anti-stall while he was attempting to pass Pierre Gasly. Gasly and Lawson made contact and Gasly's car was pitched into the barriers, bringing out the safety car. Lawson returned to the pits and retired, while Nico Hülkenberg also retired his Audi during the same period. Verstappen pitted under the safety car for hard tyres, falling to sixteenth place but moving onto a strategy that would take him to the end of the race. The safety car period ended on lap 11, with Leclerc retaining the lead at the restart. Piastri overtook Russell for fourth shortly after the restart, while the lead battle intensified. Norris passed Leclerc for the lead, leaving the Ferrari driver to defend from Antonelli. Antonelli and Leclerc exchanged second place before Antonelli moved ahead, while Verstappen recovered to eleventh but was noted by the stewards for crossing the pit exit line after his pit stop.

By the middle phase of the race, Norris had opened a lead of more than two seconds over Antonelli, while Leclerc and Piastri ran behind them. Russell was the first of the front-runners to pit, switching to hard tyres on lap 21 and rejoining in twelfth. Ferrari responded by stopping Leclerc shortly afterwards, but a slow 3.7-second stop dropped him behind Russell. Leclerc questioned the timing of the stop over team radio. Light rain began to be reported at parts of the circuit but did not become heavy enough to require intermediate tyres. Antonelli pitted on lap 27, rejoining on hard tyres behind Verstappen and Hamilton. Norris stopped one lap later and emerged just behind Antonelli. Piastri stayed out briefly and led before making his own stop, after which Verstappen inherited the lead on older hard tyres. Antonelli passed Verstappen on lap 29, with Norris following him through shortly afterwards. The pit sequence left Antonelli ahead of Norris, while Verstappen continued on his long hard-tyre stint ahead of the recovering Leclerc, Piastri and Russell. Norris then closed back onto Antonelli during the second stint. Antonelli reported a possible gearbox issue and later complained about his rear tyres, while Norris reduced the gap to under one second. Behind them, Piastri and Russell battled over position before Norris moved ahead, while Leclerc recovered from his slow pit stop and began closing on Verstappen. By lap 40, Antonelli led Norris by less than a second, with Verstappen several seconds further back in third on much older tyres.

In the closing stages, Verstappen's tyre disadvantage left him vulnerable. Leclerc caught him and passed for third on lap 47, while Piastri overtook Verstappen on the following lap. Piastri then closed on Leclerc and passed him for the final podium position late in the race. Russell also caught Verstappen, and the two made minor contact while fighting for position, leaving Russell with front-wing damage. Leclerc then spun on the final lap and hit the wall, damaging his Ferrari. Although he continued, the damage forced him off track several times, and he was passed by Russell and Verstappen in the final corners. Antonelli held off Norris to win by 3.264 seconds, taking his third consecutive Grand Prix victory and extending his championship lead. Norris finished second, while Piastri completed the podium for McLaren after his late pass on Leclerc. Russell finished fourth on the road ahead of Verstappen, Hamilton and Colapinto, with Leclerc sixth on track before post-race penalties changed the final classification. Antonelli became the third driver, after Damon Hill and Mika Häkkinen, to take their first three Grand Prix victories n consecutive races.

==== Post-race ====
After the race, Verstappen received a five-second time penalty for crossing the pit exit line, though this did not affect his final position. Leclerc received a drive-through penalty, converted into a twenty-second time penalty, for leaving the track on several occasions without a justifiable reason while driving his damaged car. The penalty dropped him from sixth to eighth in the final classification, promoting Hamilton to sixth and Colapinto to seventh. Carlos Sainz Jr. and Alexander Albon completed the points positions for Williams in ninth and tenth.

=== Race classification ===
Pos.	No.	Driver	Constructor	Laps	Time/Retired	Grid	Points
1	12	(Italy) Kimi Antonelli	Mercedes	57	1:33:19.273	1	25
2	1	(United Kingdom) Lando Norris	McLaren-Mercedes	57	+3.264	4	18
3	81	(Australia) Oscar Piastri	McLaren-Mercedes	57	+27.092	7	15
4	63	(United Kingdom) George Russell	Mercedes	57	+43.051	5	12
5	3	(Netherlands) Max Verstappen	Red Bull Racing-Red Bull Ford	57	+48.949^{a}	2	10
6	44	(United Kingdom) Lewis Hamilton	Ferrari	57	+53.753	6	8
7	43	(Argentina) Franco Colapinto	Alpine-Mercedes	57	+1:01.871	8	6
8	16	(Monaco) Charles Leclerc	Ferrari	57	+1:04.245^{b}	3	4
9	55	(Spain) Carlos Sainz Jr.	Atlassian Williams-Mercedes	57	+1:22.072	13	2
10	23	(Thailand) Alexander Albon	Atlassian Williams-Mercedes	57	+1:30.972	15	1
11	87	(United Kingdom) Oliver Bearman	Haas-Ferrari	56	+1 lap	12	
12	5	(Brazil) Gabriel Bortoleto	Audi	56	+1 lap	21	
13	31	(France) Esteban Ocon	Haas-Ferrari	56	+1 lap	14	
14	41	(United Kingdom) Arvid Lindblad	Racing Bulls-Red Bull Ford	56	+1 lap	16	
15	14	(Spain) Fernando Alonso	Aston Martin Aramco-Honda	56	+1 lap	17	
16	11	(Mexico) Sergio Pérez	Cadillac-Ferrari	56	+1 lap	20	
17	18	(Canada) Lance Stroll	Aston Martin Aramco-Honda	56	+1 lap	18	
18	77	(Finland) Valtteri Bottas	Cadillac-Ferrari	55	+2 laps	19	
Ret	27	(Germany) Nico Hülkenberg	Audi	7	Overheating	10	
Ret	30	(New Zealand) Liam Lawson	Racing Bulls-Red Bull Ford	6	Gearbox	11	
Ret	10	(France) Pierre Gasly	Alpine-Mercedes	4	Collision	9	
Ret	6	(France) Isack Hadjar	Red Bull Racing-Red Bull Ford	4	Accident	PL	

Notes

- ^a – Max Verstappen received a five-second time penalty for crossing the white line at pit exit. His final position was not affected by the penalty.
- ^b – Charles Leclerc finished sixth on track, but received a post-race drive-through penalty converted into a twenty-second time penalty for leaving the track on several occasions without reason.

== Championship standings after the race ==
Drivers' Championship standings

	Pos.	Driver	Points
	1	(Italy) Kimi Antonelli	100
	2	(United Kingdom) George Russell	80
	3	(Monaco) Charles Leclerc	59
1	4	(United Kingdom) Lando Norris	51
1	5	(United Kingdom) Lewis Hamilton	51

Constructors' Championship standings

	Pos.	Constructor	Points
	1	(Germany) Mercedes	180
	2	(Italy) Ferrari	110
	3	(United Kingdom) McLaren-Mercedes	94
2	4	(Austria) Red Bull Racing-Red Bull Ford	30
	5	(France) Alpine-Mercedes	23

- Note: Only the top five positions are included for both sets of standings.

== See also ==
- 2026 Miami Formula 2 round

== Notes ==
Previous race: 2026 Japanese Grand Prix	FIA Formula One World Championship; 2026 season	Next race: 2026 Canadian Grand Prix
Previous race: 2025 Miami Grand Prix	Miami Grand Prix	Next race: 2027 Miami Grand Prix
