= 2022 Spanish Grand Prix =

6th round of the 2022 Formula One season

Race 6 of 22 in the 2022 Formula One World Championship
| ← Previous race | Next race → |
- Layout of the Circuit de Barcelona-Catalunya

Race details
- Date: 22 May 2022
- Official name: Formula 1 Pirelli Gran Premio de España 2022
- Location: Circuit de Barcelona-Catalunya; Montmeló, Catalonia, Spain
- Course: Permanent racing facility
- Course length: 4.675 km (2.905 miles)
- Distance: 66 laps, 308.550 km (191.646 miles)
- Weather: Sunny
- Attendance: 277,836

Pole position
| Driver | (Monaco) Charles Leclerc | Ferrari |
- Time: 1:18.750

Fastest lap
| Driver | (Mexico) Sergio Pérez | Red Bull Racing-RBPT |
- Time: 1:24.108 on lap 55

Podium
| First | (Netherlands) Max Verstappen | Red Bull Racing-RBPT |
| Second | (Mexico) Sergio Pérez | Red Bull Racing-RBPT |
| Third | (United Kingdom) George Russell | Mercedes |

The 2022 Spanish Grand Prix (officially known as the Formula 1 Pirelli Gran Premio de España 2022) was a Formula One motor race held on 22 May 2022 at the Circuit de Barcelona-Catalunya in Montmeló, Spain. It was the 62nd edition of the Spanish Grand Prix and the sixth round of the 2022 Formula One World Championship.

Max Verstappen won the race ahead of teammate Sergio Pérez, while George Russell completed the podium. Charles Leclerc, the pole-sitter and championship leader, was forced to retire due to engine issues. Leclerc's teammate Carlos Sainz Jr. recovered from 11th, after suffering a spin, to finish fourth, ahead of Lewis Hamilton, who also made a come back from 19th, after suffering a puncture at the start.

== Background ==
=== Championship standings before the race ===
Charles Leclerc was the Drivers' Championship leader after the fifth round, the Miami Grand Prix, with 104 points, 19 ahead of Max Verstappen in second, with Sergio Pérez in third, 19 points behind Verstappen. In the Constructors' Championship, Ferrari leads Red Bull Racing by 6 points and Mercedes by 62.

=== Entrants ===
The drivers and teams were the same as the season entry list with no additional stand-in drivers for the race. Nyck de Vries drove for Williams in place of Alexander Albon and Jüri Vips for Red Bull Racing in place of Sergio Pérez during the first practice session, making their Formula One practice debuts. Robert Kubica took part in the same session for Alfa Romeo in place of Zhou Guanyu.

=== Tyre choices ===
Tyre supplier Pirelli brought the C1, C2, and C3 tyre compounds (designated hard, medium, and soft, respectively) for teams to use at the event.

== Practice ==
There were three practice sessions, each lasting one hour. The first two practice sessions took place on Friday 20 May at 14:00 and 17:00 local time (UTC+02:00) and the third practice session took place at 13:00 on 21 May. Charles Leclerc led each practice session, the first ahead of Carlos Sainz Jr. and Max Verstappen, the second ahead of George Russell, and Lewis Hamilton, and the third ahead of Verstappen and Russell.

== Qualifying ==
Qualifying took place on 21 May at 16:00 local time and lasted one hour.

=== Qualifying report ===
In the first part of qualifying, Sebastian Vettel, Fernando Alonso, Lance Stroll, Alexander Albon, and Nicholas Latifi were eliminated. In the second part of qualifying, Lando Norris, who had his time deleted for track limits at turn 9, Esteban Ocon, Yuki Tsunoda, Pierre Gasly, and Zhou Guanyu were eliminated. In the third part of qualifying, Charles Leclerc spun in the chicane at turns 14–15 of his first run but was able to later take the pole position, ahead of Max Verstappen, who had DRS issues and had to abort his final lap, and Carlos Sainz Jr. George Russell, Sergio Pérez, Lewis Hamilton, Valtteri Bottas, Kevin Magnussen, Daniel Ricciardo, and Mick Schumacher completed the top ten.

=== Qualifying classification ===
| Pos. | No. | Driver | Constructor | Qualifying times | | | Final grid |
| Pos. | No. | Driver | Constructor | Q1 | Q2 | Q3 | Final grid |
|---|---|---|---|---|---|---|---|
| 1 | 16 | (Monaco) Charles Leclerc | Ferrari | 1:19.861 | 1:19.969 | 1:18.750 | 1 |
| 2 | 1 | (Netherlands) Max Verstappen | Red Bull Racing-RBPT | 1:20.091 | 1:19.219 | 1:19.073 | 2 |
| 3 | 55 | (Spain) Carlos Sainz Jr. | Ferrari | 1:19.892 | 1:19.453 | 1:19.166 | 3 |
| 4 | 63 | (United Kingdom) George Russell | Mercedes | 1:20.218 | 1:19.470 | 1:19.393 | 4 |
| 5 | 11 | (Mexico) Sergio Pérez | Red Bull Racing-RBPT | 1:20.447 | 1:19.830 | 1:19.420 | 5 |
| 6 | 44 | (United Kingdom) Lewis Hamilton | Mercedes | 1:20.252 | 1:19.794 | 1:19.512 | 6 |
| 7 | 77 | (Finland) Valtteri Bottas | Alfa Romeo-Ferrari | 1:20.355 | 1:20.053 | 1:19.608 | 7 |
| 8 | 20 | (Denmark) Kevin Magnussen | Haas-Ferrari | 1:20.227 | 1:19.810 | 1:19.682 | 8 |
| 9 | 3 | (Australia) Daniel Ricciardo | McLaren-Mercedes | 1:20.549 | 1:20.287 | 1:20.297 | 9 |
| 10 | 47 | (Germany) Mick Schumacher | Haas-Ferrari | 1:20.683 | 1:20.436 | 1:20.638 | 10 |
| 11 | 4 | (United Kingdom) Lando Norris | McLaren-Mercedes | 1:20.838 | 1:20.471 | N/A | 11 |
| 12 | 31 | (France) Esteban Ocon | Alpine-Renault | 1:20.880 | 1:20.638 | N/A | 12 |
| 13 | 22 | (Japan) Yuki Tsunoda | AlphaTauri-RBPT | 1:20.707 | 1:20.639 | N/A | 13 |
| 14 | 10 | (France) Pierre Gasly | AlphaTauri-RBPT | 1:20.719 | 1:20.861 | N/A | 14 |
| 15 | 24 | (China) Zhou Guanyu | Alfa Romeo-Ferrari | 1:20.476 | 1:21.094 | N/A | 15 |
| 16 | 5 | (Germany) Sebastian Vettel | Aston Martin Aramco-Mercedes | 1:20.954 | N/A | N/A | 16 |
| 17 | 14 | (Spain) Fernando Alonso | Alpine-Renault | 1:21.043 | N/A | N/A | 20^{1} |
| 18 | 18 | (Canada) Lance Stroll | Aston Martin Aramco-Mercedes | 1:21.418 | N/A | N/A | 17 |
| 19 | 23 | (Thailand) Alexander Albon | Williams-Mercedes | 1:21.645 | N/A | N/A | 18 |
| 20 | 6 | (Canada) Nicholas Latifi | Williams-Mercedes | 1:21.915 | N/A | N/A | 19 |
107% time: 1:25.451

Notes

- ^1 – Fernando Alonso was required to start the race from the back of the grid for exceeding his quota of power unit elements.

== Race ==
The race started at 15:00 local time, with Lewis Hamilton starting with the medium compound, and the rest of the field starting on the soft compound.

=== Race report ===
Charles Leclerc kept the lead ahead of Max Verstappen, while Carlos Sainz Jr. had a bad start and was overtaken by George Russell and Sergio Pérez. Going into turn 4, Hamilton and Kevin Magnussen had contact, with Magnussen driving through the gravel, leaving the drivers running in 19th and 20th respectively. Hamilton, who had suffered a front-left tyre puncture, suggested retiring the car but was motivated to race by the team. Sainz Jr. spun at turn 4 on lap 7, dropping to 11th, and Verstappen at the same spot two laps later, both of them blamed it on a wind gust, and Sainz said the car suffered damage that hampered his comeback, and that he was "not driving naturally". By lap 12, Verstappen was let through by Pèrez but was suffering from recurring DRS issues, despite parts of DRS being replaced before the race. On lap 13, Russell and Verstappen were the first of the top four drivers to pit for the medium-compound tyres, followed on lap 18 by Pèrez, who came out behind Russell and Verstappen. As Verstappen was not able to pass Russell, Pèrez asked to be given back the position on lap 26 but was denied, although he was promised a position swap later in the race.

On lap 27, Leclerc, who pitted later than the other top four driver and had built a significant lead, retired from the race with a turbo and MGU-H failure, Zhou Guanyu retired a few laps later. Russell inherited the lead of the race, with Pérez in second, while Verstappen had an early second pit stop on lap 30. On lap 31, Perez managed to overtake Russell for the lead. On lap 36, Russell pitted, followed by Pérez a lap later; both went for the medium compound. On lap 44, Verstappen pitted for a third time, back onto the medium-compound tyre, with Pèrez now leading the race. Pérez was instructed to let Verstappen through as they were on different strategies, handing Verstappen the lead of the race on lap 49; Pérez described this as "unfair", and Verstappen would remain unchallenged for the rest of the race. Hamilton, running in 5th, overtook Sainz for 4th on lap 60, Sainz retook the position on lap 64, with Hamilton being told to lift and coast, and his teammate Russell also having to slow down due to overheating issues. Despite the issues, Russell and Hamilton were able to finish third and fifth, respectively. On lap 55, Pérez set the fastest lap of the race.

Verstappen won the race ahead of Pérez, producing the Red Bull team's second 1–2 finish of the season. Valtteri Bottas, Esteban Ocon, Lando Norris, Fernando Alonso, the latter of whom started 20th because he took a grid penalty for exceeding his quota of power unit elements, and Yuki Tsunoda completed the top-ten finishers. For the first time in the season, Verstappen and Red Bull took the lead in the Drivers' and Constructors' standings. After the race, Pérez said he wanted answers from the team. Pérez later said he was satisfied after internal talks. Despite his retirement, Leclerc said he "[felt] better" with Ferrari improving race pace and tyre management, two issues that held the team back in the last two races at the Emilia Romagna and Miami Grands Prix. At the same time, Leclerc said: "We can't afford [for] this to happen too many times." Hamilton said that his comeback felt "better than a win".

=== Race classification ===
| Pos. | No. | Driver | Constructor | Laps | Time/Retired | Grid | Points |
|---|---|---|---|---|---|---|---|
| 1 | 1 | (Netherlands) Max Verstappen | Red Bull Racing-RBPT | 66 | 1:37:20.475 | 2 | 25 |
| 2 | 11 | (Mexico) Sergio Pérez | Red Bull Racing-RBPT | 66 | +13.072 | 5 | 19^{1} |
| 3 | 63 | (United Kingdom) George Russell | Mercedes | 66 | +32.927 | 4 | 15 |
| 4 | 55 | (Spain) Carlos Sainz Jr. | Ferrari | 66 | +45.208 | 3 | 12 |
| 5 | 44 | (United Kingdom) Lewis Hamilton | Mercedes | 66 | +54.534 | 6 | 10 |
| 6 | 77 | (Finland) Valtteri Bottas | Alfa Romeo-Ferrari | 66 | +59.976 | 7 | 8 |
| 7 | 31 | (France) Esteban Ocon | Alpine-Renault | 66 | +1:15.397 | 12 | 6 |
| 8 | 4 | (United Kingdom) Lando Norris | McLaren-Mercedes | 66 | +1:23.235 | 11 | 4 |
| 9 | 14 | (Spain) Fernando Alonso | Alpine-Renault | 65 | +1 lap | 20 | 2 |
| 10 | 22 | (Japan) Yuki Tsunoda | AlphaTauri-RBPT | 65 | +1 lap | 13 | 1 |
| 11 | 5 | (Germany) Sebastian Vettel | Aston Martin Aramco-Mercedes | 65 | +1 lap | 16 | |
| 12 | 3 | (Australia) Daniel Ricciardo | McLaren-Mercedes | 65 | +1 lap | 9 | |
| 13 | 10 | (France) Pierre Gasly | AlphaTauri-RBPT | 65 | +1 lap | 14 | |
| 14 | 47 | (Germany) Mick Schumacher | Haas-Ferrari | 65 | +1 lap | 10 | |
| 15 | 18 | (Canada) Lance Stroll | Aston Martin Aramco-Mercedes | 65 | +1 lap | 17 | |
| 16 | 6 | (Canada) Nicholas Latifi | Williams-Mercedes | 64 | +2 laps | 19 | |
| 17 | 20 | (Denmark) Kevin Magnussen | Haas-Ferrari | 64 | +2 laps | 8 | |
| 18 | 23 | (Thailand) Alexander Albon | Williams-Mercedes | 64 | +2 laps^{2} | 18 | |
| Ret | 24 | (China) Zhou Guanyu | Alfa Romeo-Ferrari | 28 | Power loss | 15 | |
| Ret | 16 | (Monaco) Charles Leclerc | Ferrari | 27 | Turbo | 1 | |
Fastest lap: (Mexico) Sergio Pérez (Red Bull Racing-RBPT) – 1:24.108 (lap 55)

Notes

- ^1 – Includes one point for fastest lap.
- ^2 – Alexander Albon received a five-second time penalty for leaving the track multiple times. His final position was not affected by the penalty.

== Championship standings after the race ==
Drivers' Championship standings

| | Pos. | Driver | Points |
|---|---|---|---|
| 1 | 1 | (Netherlands) Max Verstappen | 110 |
| 1 | 2 | (Monaco) Charles Leclerc | 104 |
| | 3 | (Mexico) Sergio Pérez | 85 |
| | 4 | (United Kingdom) George Russell | 74 |
| | 5 | (Spain) Carlos Sainz Jr. | 65 |

Constructors' Championship standings

| | Pos. | Constructor | Points |
|---|---|---|---|
| 1 | 1 | (Austria) Red Bull Racing-RBPT | 195 |
| 1 | 2 | (Italy) Ferrari | 169 |
| | 3 | (Germany) Mercedes | 120 |
| | 4 | (United Kingdom) McLaren-Mercedes | 50 |
| | 5 | (Switzerland) Alfa Romeo-Ferrari | 39 |

- Note: Only the top five positions are included for both sets of standings.

== See also ==
- 2022 Barcelona Formula 2 round
- 2022 Barcelona Formula 3 round
- 2022 Barcelona W Series round

| Previous race: 2022 Miami Grand Prix | FIA Formula One World Championship; 2022 season | Next race: 2022 Monaco Grand Prix |
| Previous race: 2021 Spanish Grand Prix | Spanish Grand Prix | Next race: 2023 Spanish Grand Prix |
