= 2026 Miami ePrix =

Race 3 of 17 of the 2025–26 Formula E season
← Previous race	Next race →
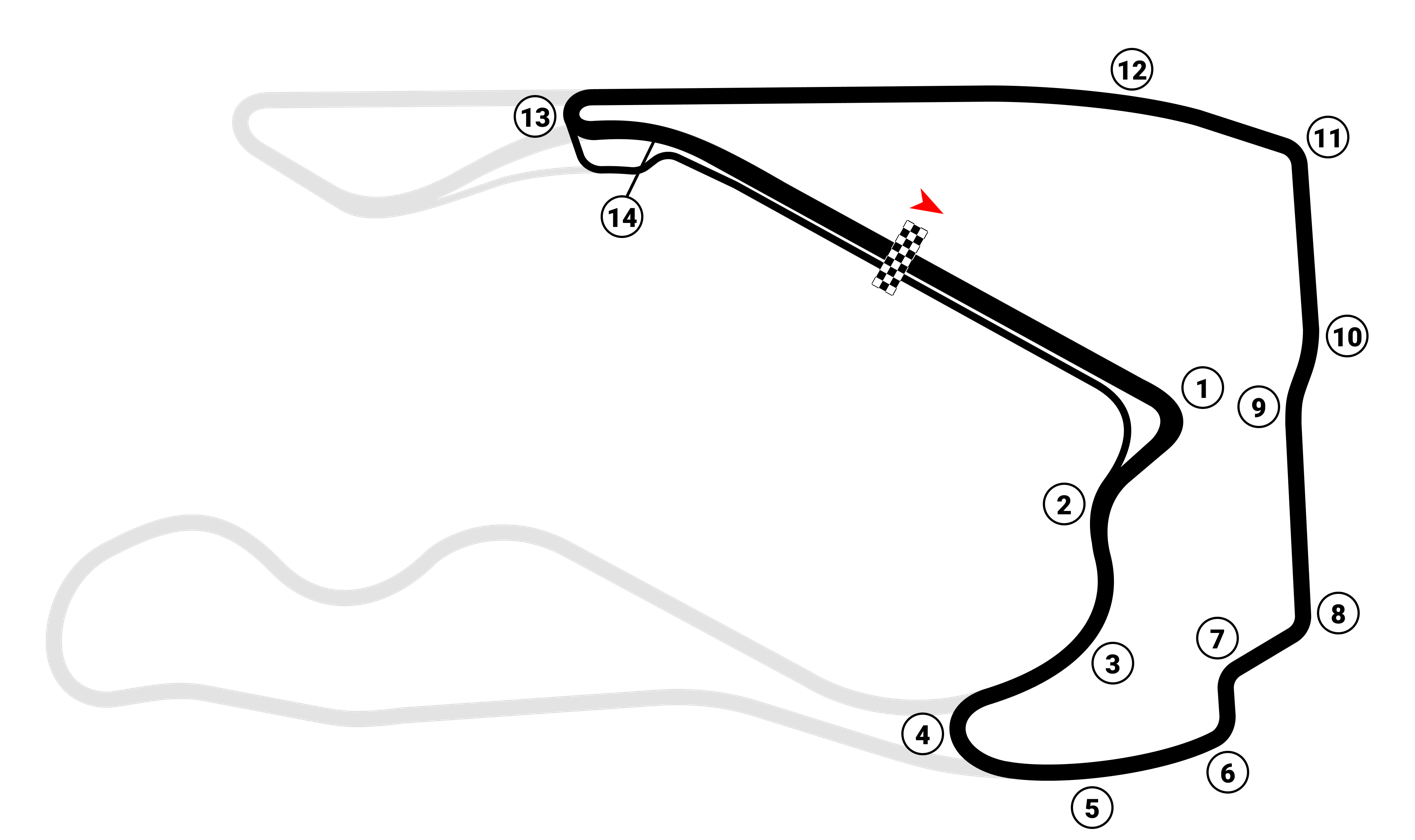

Race details
- Date: January 31, 2026
- Official name: 2026 Miami E-Prix
- Location: Miami International Autodrome, Miami Gardens, Florida, United States
- Course: Purpose-built temporary circuit
- Course length: 2.320 km (1.442 mi)
- Distance: 41 laps, 95.12 km (59.10 mi)

Pole position
Driver	(Switzerland) Nico Müller	Porsche
- Time: 55.455

Fastest lap
Driver	(United Kingdom) Oliver Rowland	Nissan
- Time: 1:02.316 on lap 25

Podium
First	(New Zealand) Mitch Evans	Jaguar
Second	(Switzerland) Nico Müller	Porsche
Third	(Germany) Pascal Wehrlein	Porsche

The 2026 Miami ePrix, was a Formula E motor race held on January 31, 2026 at the Miami International Autodrome, Miami Gardens, Florida, United States. It marked the debut of Formula E ePrix at this circuit. It served as the third championship race of the 2025–26 Formula E season and the third edition of the Miami ePrix.

== Background ==
Nick Cassidy led the championship with 40 points. Jake Dennis and Oliver Rowland were second and third respectively, with 4 and 6 points behind respectively.

== Classification ==
(All times are in EDT).

=== Qualifying ===
Qualifying took place at 9:40 AM on 31 January.

Group draw
Group A	(New Zealand) CAS	(United Kingdom) ROW	(Switzerland) MOR	(Switzerland) MUE	(Switzerland) BUE	(Spain) MAR	(Netherlands) DEV	(France) NAT	(New Zealand) EVA	(Brazil) DIG
Group B	(United Kingdom) DEN	(Germany) WEH	(United Kingdom) BAR	(Germany) GUE	(Sweden) ERI	(France) JEV	(Barbados) MAL	(Portugal) DAC	(Brazil) DRU	(United Kingdom) TIC

=== Qualifying duels ===
Quarter-finals
A2	(New Zealand) Nick Cassidy
A3	(Netherlands) Nyck de Vries
A1	(France) Norman Nato
A4	(Switzerland) Nico Müller
B2	(Portugal) Antonio Felix da Costa
B3	(Sweden) Joel Eriksson
B1	(United Kingdom) Taylor Barnard
B4	(Brazil) Felipe Drugovich

Semi-finals
(Netherlands) Nyck de Vries
(Switzerland) Nico Müller
(Portugal) Antonio Felix da Costa
(Brazil) Felipe Drugovich

Final
(Switzerland) Nico Müller
(Brazil) Felipe Drugovich

==== Overall classification ====
Pos.	No.	Driver	Team	A	B	QF	SF	F	Grid
1	51	(Switzerland) Nico Müller	Porsche	56.954	—N/a	55.737	55.516	55.455	1
2	28	(Brazil) Felipe Drugovich	Andretti-Porsche	—N/a	56.848	55.700	55.393	55.584	2
3	13	(Portugal) António Félix da Costa	Jaguar	—N/a	56.837	55.623	55.556	—N/a	3
4	21	(Netherlands) Nyck de Vries	Mahindra	56.942	—N/a	55.873	55.622	—N/a	4
5	77	(United Kingdom) Taylor Barnard	DS Penske	—N/a	56.562	55.701	—N/a	—N/a	5
6	14	(Sweden) Joel Eriksson	Envision-Jaguar	—N/a	56.838	55.861	—N/a	—N/a	6
7	37	(New Zealand) Nick Cassidy	Citroën	56.845	—N/a	56.006	—N/a	—N/a	7
8	23	(France) Norman Nato	Nissan	56.765	—N/a	No Time	—N/a	—N/a	8
9	9	(New Zealand) Mitch Evans	Jaguar	57.012	—N/a	—N/a	—N/a	—N/a	9
10	7	(Germany) Maximilian Günther	DS Penske	—N/a	56.854	—N/a	—N/a	—N/a	10
11	1	(United Kingdom) Oliver Rowland	Nissan	57.061	—N/a	—N/a	—N/a	—N/a	11
12	94	(Germany) Pascal Wehrlein	Porsche	—N/a	56.879	—N/a	—N/a	—N/a	12
13	3	(Spain) Pepe Martí	Cupra Kiro-Porsche	57.066	—N/a	—N/a	—N/a	—N/a	13
14	22	(Barbados) Zane Maloney	Lola Yamaha ABT	—N/a	56.953	—N/a	—N/a	—N/a	14
15	16	(Switzerland) Sébastien Buemi	Envision-Jaguar	57.190	—N/a	—N/a	—N/a	—N/a	15
16	27	(United Kingdom) Jake Dennis	Andretti-Porsche	—N/a	57.026	—N/a	—N/a	—N/a	16
17	48	(Switzerland) Edoardo Mortara	Mahindra	57.236	—N/a	—N/a	—N/a	—N/a	17
18	25	(France) Jean-Éric Vergne	Citroën	—N/a	57.106	—N/a	—N/a	—N/a	18
19	11	(Brazil) Lucas di Grassi	Lola Yamaha ABT	57.250	—N/a	—N/a	—N/a	—N/a	19
20	33	(United Kingdom) Dan Ticktum	Cupra Kiro-Porsche	—N/a	57.260	—N/a	—N/a	—N/a	20

=== Race ===
Race started at 2:05 PM on 31 January.

Pos.	No.	Driver	Team	Laps	Time/Retired	Grid	Points
1	9	(New Zealand) Mitch Evans	Jaguar	41	48:43.266	9	25+1^{2}
2	51	(Switzerland) Nico Müller	Porsche	41	+3.151	1	18+3^{1}
3	94	(Germany) Pascal Wehrlein	Porsche	41	+8.827	11	15
4	14	(Sweden) Joel Eriksson	Envision-Jaguar	41	+12.394	6	12
5	21	(Netherlands) Nyck de Vries	Mahindra	41	+16.561	4	10
6	48	(Switzerland) Edoardo Mortara	Mahindra	41	+17.525	16	8
7	16	(Switzerland) Sébastien Buemi	Envision-Jaguar	41	+17.718	20	6
8	13	(Portugal) António Félix da Costa	Jaguar	41	+18.903	3	4
9	3	(Spain) Pepe Martí	Cupra Kiro-Porsche	41	+20.576	12	2
10	27	(United Kingdom) Jake Dennis	Andretti-Porsche	41	+21.102	15	1
11	22	(Barbados) Zane Maloney	Lola Yamaha ABT	41	+21.817	13	
12	1	(United Kingdom) Oliver Rowland	Nissan	41	+31.075	14	
13	11	(Brazil) Lucas di Grassi	Lola Yamaha ABT	41	+33.315	19	
14	77	(United Kingdom) Taylor Barnard	DS Penske	41	+36.131	5	
15	25	(France) Jean-Éric Vergne	Citroën	41	+47.066	17	
16	37	(New Zealand) Nick Cassidy	Citroën	40	+1 lap	7	
17	23	(France) Norman Nato	Nissan	40	+1 lap	8	
18	28	(Brazil) Felipe Drugovich	Andretti-Porsche	40	+1 lap	2	
19	7	(Germany) Maximilian Günther	DS Penske	39	+ 2 laps	10	
20	33	(United Kingdom) Dan Ticktum	Cupra Kiro-Porsche	0		18	

Notes:

- ^1 – Pole position.
- ^2 – Fastest lap.

=== Standings after the race ===
Drivers' Championship standings

	Pos	Driver	Points
	1	(New Zealand) Nick Cassidy	40
2	2	(Germany) Pascal Wehrlein	38
1	3	(United Kingdom) Jake Dennis	37
1	4	(United Kingdom) Oliver Rowland	34
2	5	(Switzerland) Nico Müller	33

Teams' Championship standings

	Pos	Team	Points
3	1	(Germany) Porsche	71
1	2	(France) Citroën	44
2	3	(India) Mahindra	38
2	4	(United States) Andretti	37
1	5	(Japan) Nissan	35

Manufacturers' Championship standings

	Pos	Manufacturer	Points
1	1	(Germany) Porsche	88
1	2	(Netherlands) Stellantis	63
2	3	(United Kingdom) Jaguar	56
1	4	(Japan) Nissan	43
1	5	(India) Mahindra	40

- Notes: Only the top five positions are included for all three sets of standings.

Previous race: 2026 Mexico City ePrix	FIA Formula E World Championship; 2025–26 season	Next race: 2026 Jeddah ePrix (February)
Previous race: 2025 Miami ePrix	Miami ePrix	Next race: 2027 Miami ePrix
