= 2023 Miami Grand Prix =

Formula One motor race

Race 5 of 22 (Note: At the time of the event Formula One planned to hold twenty-three Grands Prix.) in the 2023 Formula One World Championship
| ← Previous race | Next race → |
- Layout of the Miami International Autodrome

Race details
- Date: May 7, 2023
- Official name: Formula 1 Crypto.com Miami Grand Prix 2023
- Location: Miami International Autodrome, Miami Gardens, Florida
- Course: Purpose-built temporary circuit
- Course length: 5.412 km (3.363 miles)
- Distance: 57 laps, 308.326 km (191.584 miles)
- Weather: Partly cloudy
- Attendance: 270,491

Pole position
| Driver | (Mexico) Sergio Pérez | Red Bull Racing-Honda RBPT |
- Time: 1:26.841

Fastest lap
| Driver | (Netherlands) Max Verstappen | Red Bull Racing-Honda RBPT |
- Time: 1:29.708 on lap 56 (lap record)

Podium
| First | (Netherlands) Max Verstappen | Red Bull Racing-Honda RBPT |
| Second | (Mexico) Sergio Pérez | Red Bull Racing-Honda RBPT |
| Third | (Spain) Fernando Alonso | Aston Martin-Mercedes |

The 2023 Miami Grand Prix (officially known as the Formula 1 Crypto.com Miami Grand Prix 2023) was a Formula One motor race held on May 7, 2023, at the Miami International Autodrome in Miami Gardens, Florida. It was the fifth round of the 2023 Formula One World Championship.

Despite Sergio Pérez taking pole position, the race was won by his Red Bull Racing teammate Max Verstappen from ninth, ahead of Pérez and Fernando Alonso.

== Background ==
The event was held across the weekend of May 5–7, 2023. It was the fifth round of the 2023 Formula One World Championship.

=== Championship standings before the race ===
Going into the weekend, Max Verstappen led the World Drivers' Championship with 93 points, 6 points ahead of his teammate Sergio Pérez in second, and 33 ahead of Fernando Alonso in third. Red Bull Racing, with 180 points, led the Constructors' Championship from Aston Martin and Mercedes, who were second and third with 87 and 76 points, respectively.

=== Entrants ===
The drivers and teams were the same as the season entry list with no additional stand-in drivers for the race.

=== Tyre choices ===
Tyre supplier Pirelli brought the C2, C3, and C4 tyre compounds (designated hard, medium, and soft, respectively) for teams to use at the event.

=== Track changes ===
The first and second DRS activation points were moved 75 metres (246 ft) farther ahead, being positioned 105 metres (344 ft) after turn 9 and 525 metres (1,722 ft) after turn 16, respectively.

== Qualifying ==
Qualifying was held on May 6, 2023, at 16:00 local time (UTC−4).

=== Qualifying report ===
During the first segment, a potential impeding incident between Lewis Hamilton and Kevin Magnussen was reported, though no further action from the race stewards was taken. By the end of the session, the two McLarens of Lando Norris and Oscar Piastri, Yuki Tsunoda, Lance Stroll, and Logan Sargeant were all knocked out of the session. This was McLaren's first double Q1 exit since the 2018 Brazilian Grand Prix.

The second segment saw Sergio Pérez make contact with the wall at turn four, his car was undamaged. Alexander Albon, Nico Hülkenberg, Lewis Hamilton, Zhou Guanyu, and Nyck de Vries were all knocked out. The third segment saw the Ferrari of Charles Leclerc spin out and hit the wall at turn 7, following a similar incident during the second practice session; the session was stopped prematurely, bringing a red-flagged end to the session. Leclerc started seventh; Pérez took his third career pole position ahead of Fernando Alonso and Carlos Sainz Jr.; Haas's Kevin Magnussen took fourth. Max Verstappen was unable to set a time and ended up ninth after Leclerc's crash brought out the red flag; Valtteri Bottas was also unable to set a time.

=== Qualifying classification ===
| Pos. | No. | Driver | Constructor | Qualifying times | | | Final grid |
| Pos. | No. | Driver | Constructor | Q1 | Q2 | Q3 | Final grid |
|---|---|---|---|---|---|---|---|
| 1 | 11 | (Mexico) Sergio Pérez | Red Bull Racing-Honda RBPT | 1:27.713 | 1:27.328 | 1:26.841 | 1 |
| 2 | 14 | (Spain) Fernando Alonso | Aston Martin Aramco-Mercedes | 1:28.179 | 1:27.097 | 1:27.202 | 2 |
| 3 | 55 | (Spain) Carlos Sainz Jr. | Ferrari | 1:27.686 | 1:27.148 | 1:27.349 | 3 |
| 4 | 20 | (Denmark) Kevin Magnussen | Haas-Ferrari | 1:27.809 | 1:27.673 | 1:27.767 | 4 |
| 5 | 10 | (France) Pierre Gasly | Alpine-Renault | 1:28.061 | 1:27.612 | 1:27.786 | 5 |
| 6 | 63 | (United Kingdom) George Russell | Mercedes | 1:28.086 | 1:27.743 | 1:27.804 | 6 |
| 7 | 16 | (Monaco) Charles Leclerc | Ferrari | 1:27.713 | 1:26.964 | 1:27.861 | 7 |
| 8 | 31 | (France) Esteban Ocon | Alpine-Renault | 1:27.872 | 1:27.444 | 1:27.935 | 8 |
| 9 | 1 | (Netherlands) Max Verstappen | Red Bull Racing-Honda RBPT | 1:27.363 | 1:26.814 | No time | 9 |
| 10 | 77 | (Finland) Valtteri Bottas | Alfa Romeo-Ferrari | 1:27.864 | 1:27.564 | No time | 10 |
| 11 | 23 | (Thailand) Alexander Albon | Williams-Mercedes | 1:28.234 | 1:27.795 | N/A | 11 |
| 12 | 27 | (Germany) Nico Hülkenberg | Haas-Ferrari | 1:27.945 | 1:27.903 | N/A | 12 |
| 13 | 44 | (United Kingdom) Lewis Hamilton | Mercedes | 1:27.846 | 1:27.975 | N/A | 13 |
| 14 | 24 | (China) Zhou Guanyu | Alfa Romeo-Ferrari | 1:28.180 | 1:28.091 | N/A | 14 |
| 15 | 21 | (Netherlands) Nyck de Vries | AlphaTauri-Honda RBPT | 1:28.325 | 1:28.395 | N/A | 15 |
| 16 | 4 | (United Kingdom) Lando Norris | McLaren-Mercedes | 1:28.394 | N/A | N/A | 16 |
| 17 | 22 | (Japan) Yuki Tsunoda | AlphaTauri-Honda RBPT | 1:28.429 | N/A | N/A | 17 |
| 18 | 18 | (Canada) Lance Stroll | Aston Martin Aramco-Mercedes | 1:28.476 | N/A | N/A | 18 |
| 19 | 81 | (Australia) Oscar Piastri | McLaren-Mercedes | 1:28.484 | N/A | N/A | 19 |
| 20 | 2 | (United States) Logan Sargeant | Williams-Mercedes | 1:28.577 | N/A | N/A | 20 |
107% time: 1:33.478

== Race ==
The race was held on May 7, 2023, at 15:30 local time (UTC−4).

=== Race report ===
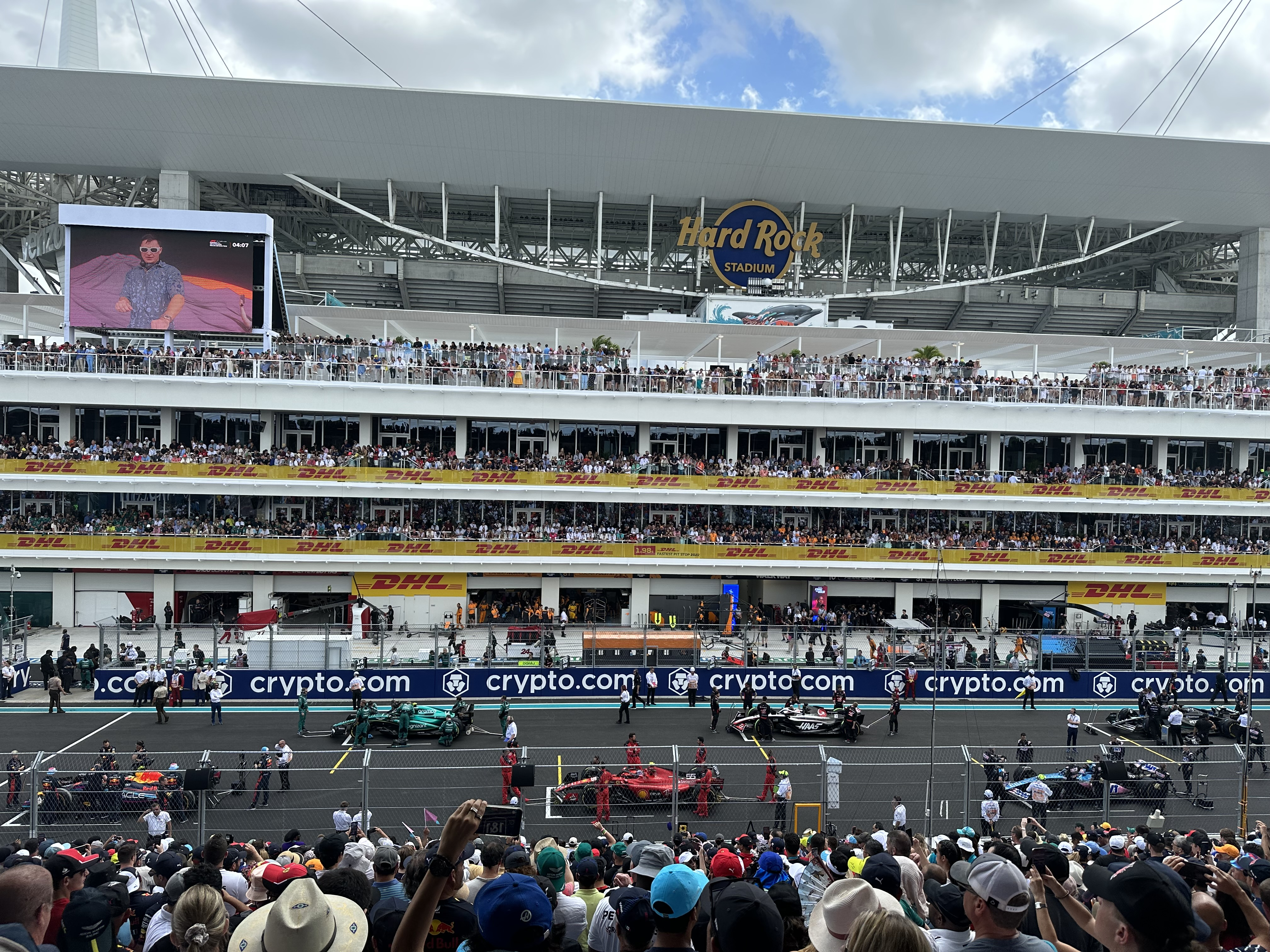
The starting grid lined up at the 2023 Miami Grand Prix, with Sergio Pérez on pole.

Polesitter Sergio Pérez kept the lead going into the first turn; his teammate Max Verstappen, who started in ninth, lost a position as both he and Esteban Ocon were passed by Valtteri Bottas, but regained it going into turn twelve (got past Ocon with Bottas maintaining 8th). Meanwhile, Nyck de Vries's car locked up, going into the rear of Lando Norris' McLaren, and Lewis Hamilton was caught behind Nico Hülkenberg. Norris and De Vries found themselves at the back of the grid, Norris seventeenth and De Vries eighteenth. Logan Sargeant went into the pit lane on lap two to swap his front wing, switching his medium tyres to a hard compound in the process. Norris, who started the race on the soft compound, followed suit; Oscar Piastri also did so by lap five. Charles Leclerc tried to pass the Haas of Kevin Magnussen for seventh, but he went wide at turn one. His teammate Carlos Sainz Jr. locked up going into the pit lane, coming out in seventh place; he was given a five-second penalty for speeding in the pit lane. His final finishing position was not affected. Having locked up in the pit lane the lap prior, Sainz then locked up again at turn one while trying to pass Hülkenberg. With Fernando Alonso going into pit lane soon after Sainz had stopped, he exited in fifth and passed both Sainz and Ocon.

Verstappen made his way up the field, starting with the Alfa Romeo of Valtteri Bottas. He soon found himself behind Leclerc and Magnussen, passing both for sixth. He then passed George Russell, Pierre Gasly, Sainz, and Alonso. Verstappen slowly made his way up to Pérez and he passed his teammate during the closing stages of the race. He won the race, with Pérez and Alonso making up the final two places on the podium, respectively.

=== Race classification ===
| Pos. | No. | Driver | Constructor | Laps | Time/Retired | Grid | Points |
|---|---|---|---|---|---|---|---|
| 1 | 1 | (Netherlands) Max Verstappen | Red Bull Racing-Honda RBPT | 57 | 1:27:38.241 | 9 | 26^{a} |
| 2 | 11 | (Mexico) Sergio Pérez | Red Bull Racing-Honda RBPT | 57 | +5.384 | 1 | 18 |
| 3 | 14 | (Spain) Fernando Alonso | Aston Martin Aramco-Mercedes | 57 | +26.305 | 2 | 15 |
| 4 | 63 | (United Kingdom) George Russell | Mercedes | 57 | +33.229 | 6 | 12 |
| 5 | 55 | (Spain) Carlos Sainz Jr. | Ferrari | 57 | +42.511^{b} | 3 | 10 |
| 6 | 44 | (United Kingdom) Lewis Hamilton | Mercedes | 57 | +51.249 | 13 | 8 |
| 7 | 16 | (Monaco) Charles Leclerc | Ferrari | 57 | +52.988 | 7 | 6 |
| 8 | 10 | (France) Pierre Gasly | Alpine-Renault | 57 | +55.670 | 5 | 4 |
| 9 | 31 | (France) Esteban Ocon | Alpine-Renault | 57 | +58.123 | 8 | 2 |
| 10 | 20 | (Denmark) Kevin Magnussen | Haas-Ferrari | 57 | +1:02.945 | 4 | 1 |
| 11 | 22 | (Japan) Yuki Tsunoda | AlphaTauri-Honda RBPT | 57 | +1:04.309 | 17 | |
| 12 | 18 | (Canada) Lance Stroll | Aston Martin Aramco-Mercedes | 57 | +1:04.754 | 18 | |
| 13 | 77 | (Finland) Valtteri Bottas | Alfa Romeo-Ferrari | 57 | +1:11.637 | 10 | |
| 14 | 23 | (Thailand) Alexander Albon | Williams-Mercedes | 57 | +1:12.861 | 11 | |
| 15 | 27 | (Germany) Nico Hülkenberg | Haas-Ferrari | 57 | +1:14.950 | 12 | |
| 16 | 24 | (China) Zhou Guanyu | Alfa Romeo-Ferrari | 57 | +1:18.440 | 14 | |
| 17 | 4 | (United Kingdom) Lando Norris | McLaren-Mercedes | 57 | +1:27.717 | 16 | |
| 18 | 21 | (Netherlands) Nyck de Vries | AlphaTauri-Honda RBPT | 57 | +1:28.949 | 15 | |
| 19 | 81 | (Australia) Oscar Piastri | McLaren-Mercedes | 56 | +1 lap | 19 | |
| 20 | 2 | (United States) Logan Sargeant | Williams-Mercedes | 56 | +1 lap | 20 | |
Fastest lap: (Netherlands) Max Verstappen (Red Bull Racing-Honda RBPT) – 1:29.708 (lap 56)

Notes

- ^a – Includes one point for fastest lap.
- ^b – Carlos Sainz Jr. received a five-second time penalty for speeding in the pit lane. His final position was not affected by the penalty.

== Championship standings after the race ==
Drivers' Championship standings

| Pos. | Driver | Points |
|---|---|---|
| 1 | (Netherlands) Max Verstappen | 119 |
| 2 | (Mexico) Sergio Pérez | 105 |
| 3 | (Spain) Fernando Alonso | 75 |
| 4 | (United Kingdom) Lewis Hamilton | 56 |
| 5 | (Spain) Carlos Sainz Jr. | 44 |

Constructors' Championship standings

| Pos. | Constructor | Points |
|---|---|---|
| 1 | (Austria) Red Bull Racing-Honda RBPT | 224 |
| 2 | (United Kingdom) Aston Martin Aramco-Mercedes | 102 |
| 3 | (Germany) Mercedes | 96 |
| 4 | (Italy) Ferrari | 78 |
| 5 | (United Kingdom) McLaren-Mercedes | 14 |

- Note: Only the top five positions are included for both sets of standings.

== Notes ==
| Previous race: 2023 Azerbaijan Grand Prix | FIA Formula One World Championship; 2023 season | Next race: 2023 Monaco Grand Prix (2023 Emilia Romagna Grand Prix canceled) |
| Previous race: 2022 Miami Grand Prix | Miami Grand Prix | Next race: 2024 Miami Grand Prix |
