= Miami Grand Prix =

Formula One race

- Miami International Autodrome

Race information
- Number of times held: 5
- First held: 2022
- Most wins (drivers): (Netherlands) Max Verstappen (2)
- Most wins (constructors): (United Kingdom) McLaren (Austria) Red Bull Racing (2)
- Circuit length: 5.412 km (3.363 miles)
- Race length: 308.326 km (191.584 miles)
- Laps: 57

Last race (2026)

Pole position
- (Italy) Kimi Antonelli; Mercedes; 1:27.798

Podium
- 1. (Italy) K. Antonelli; Mercedes; 1:33.19.273; 2. (United Kingdom) L. Norris; McLaren-Mercedes; +3.264; 3. (Australia) O. Piastri; McLaren-Mercedes; +27.092

Fastest lap
- (United Kingdom) Lando Norris; McLaren-Mercedes; 1:31.869

The Miami Grand Prix is a Formula One Grand Prix which was held for the first time during the 2022 season, with the event taking place at the Miami International Autodrome which is located around the grounds and private facilities of Hard Rock Stadium in Miami Gardens, Florida, a suburb of Miami located 16 miles (26 km) north of downtown Miami. The race has been held on the first Sunday of May and the day after the Kentucky Derby.

== History ==
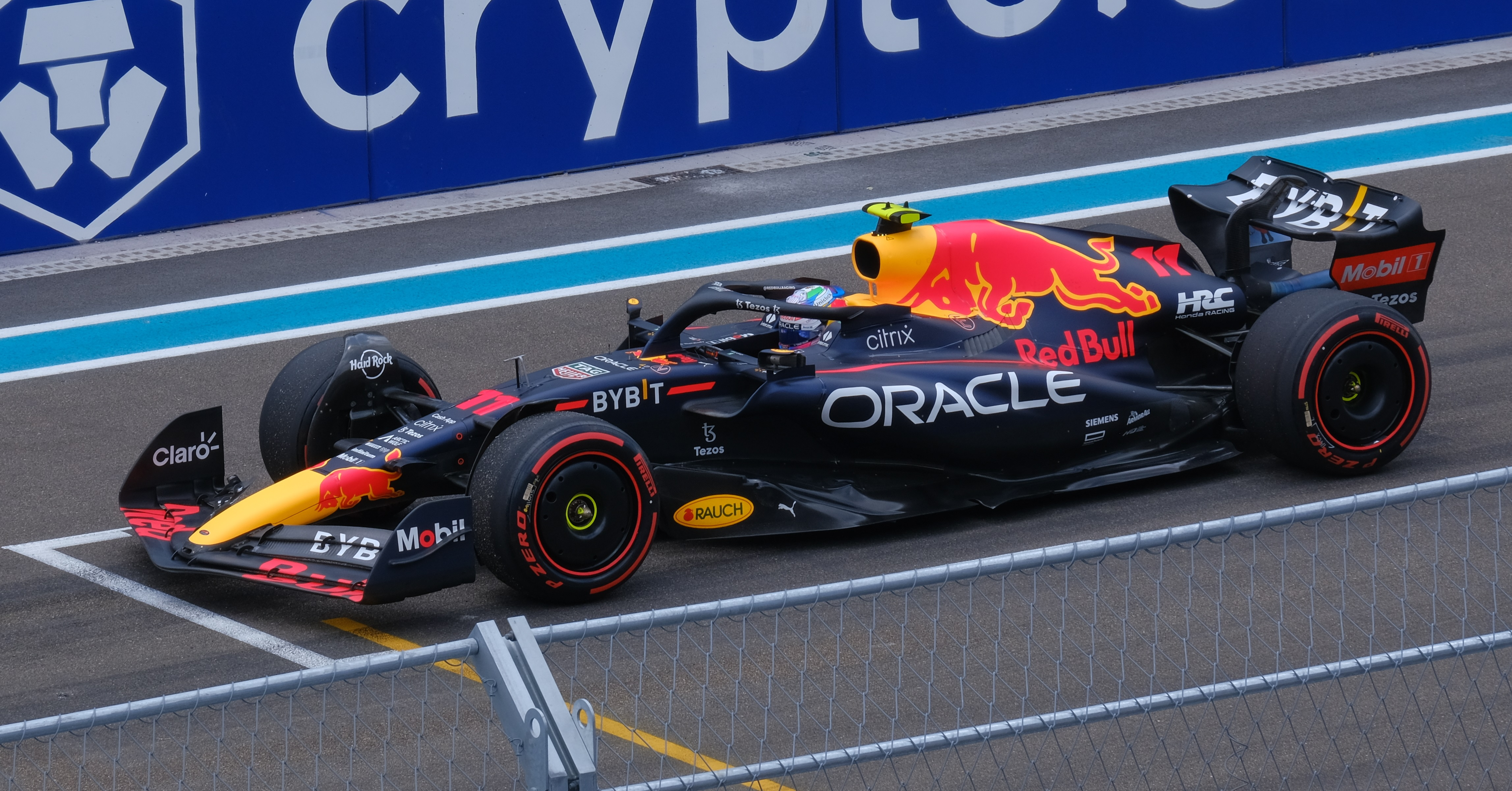
Red Bull Racing RB18 car at the 2022 Miami Grand Prix.

Miami's history of hosting racing events dates back as far as the early 1980s. Ralph Sanchez, a local Miami promoter and racing car driver proposed a race on a hybrid street/permanent circuit in Bayfront Park in the center of Miami to Formula One rights holder Bernie Ecclestone, but for various reasons was not able to make it work. So Sanchez instead ran IMSA sportscar racing on the circuit starting in 1983 for 3 years before switching to another location in Bicentennial Park in 1986. The American CART IndyCar series ran in various locations in and around Miami from the mid-1980s and mid-1990s to 2010, including Tamiami Park further inland, Bicentennial Park and the Homestead-Miami oval speedway further south of the famous Florida city.

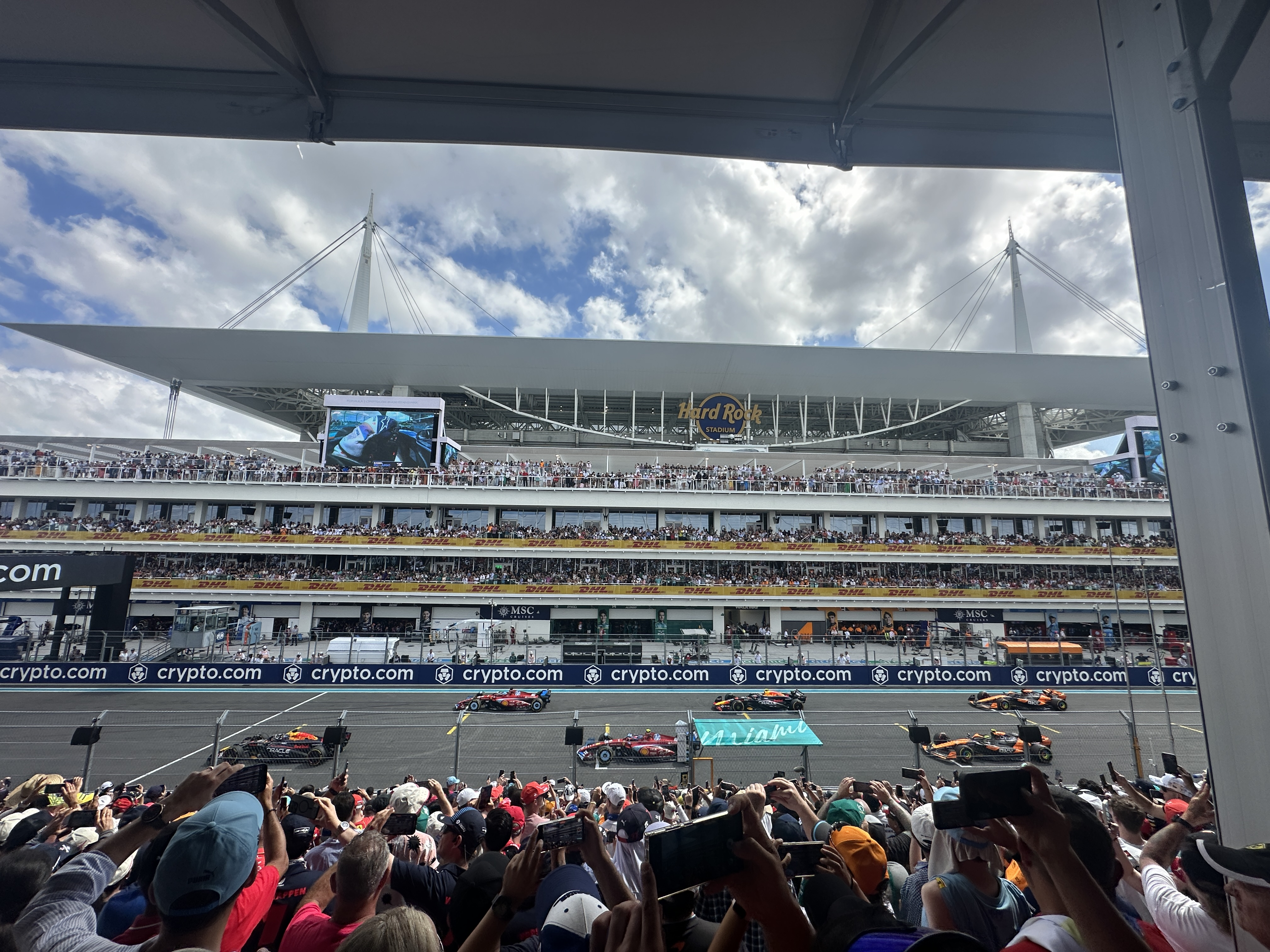
Start/finish straight at the 2024 Miami Grand Prix.

In 2018, a proposal for the Miami Grand Prix as a round of the Formula One World Championship was submitted to the city of Miami, with 2019 proposed as the first date for the race and its location around PortMiami. After complications arose due to PortMiami's construction and development plans, a proposal was submitted for a 2021 race at Hard Rock Stadium. The track then moved locations from the downtown area to the area near Hard Rock Stadium and its nearby parking lots. The race did not make it to the 2021 calendar, which saw the debut of a street circuit in Jeddah for the inaugural Saudi Arabian Grand Prix, and was announced in April 2021 for the 2022 calendar. The event was a part of the 2022 Formula One World Championship, with the race taking place at the Miami International Autodrome on a ten-year contract. The inaugural Miami Grand Prix took place on May 8, 2022. A sprint event was added to Miami in 2024 and 2025. On May 2, 2025, it was announced that the contract would be extended until 2041.

== Circuit ==
The circuit, designed and delivered by Formula One track designers Apex Circuit Design, was purpose-built for the event, with several potential track designs proposed and tested. Stephen M. Ross, owner of the stadium, had been trying to bring about the Miami Grand Prix for several years before being successful. The circuit layout is designed in a way that local residents would not be disrupted by the races. The track is a permanent style circuit with temporary infrastructure, such as barriers and fences, which will be removed when there is no racing. It is also one of the newest racetracks in the United States. The racetrack opened on May 7, 2022; the first session was held a day later, on May 8, 2022.

== Winners ==
=== By year ===
All Miami Grands Prix were held at the Miami International Autodrome.

Year	Driver	Constructor	Report
2022	(Netherlands) Max Verstappen	Red Bull Racing-RBPT	Report
2023	(Netherlands) Max Verstappen	Red Bull Racing-Honda RBPT	Report
2024	(United Kingdom) Lando Norris	McLaren-Mercedes	Report
2025	(Australia) Oscar Piastri	McLaren-Mercedes	Report
2026	(Italy) Kimi Antonelli	Mercedes	Report

=== Repeat winners (drivers) ===
Drivers in bold are competing in the Formula One championship in 2026.

Wins	Driver	Years won
2	**(Netherlands) Max Verstappen**	2022, 2023

=== Repeat winners (constructors) ===
Teams in bold are competing in the Formula One championship in 2026.

Wins	Constructor	Years won
2	(Austria) **Red Bull Racing**	2022, 2023
2	(United Kingdom) **McLaren**	2024, 2025

=== Repeat winners (engine manufacturers) ===
Manufacturers in bold are competing in the Formula One championship in 2026.

Wins	Manufacturer	Years won
3	(Germany) **Mercedes**	2024, 2025, 2026
