= Miami International Autodrome =

Racing circuit in Miami, Florida, US

- Grand Prix Circuit (2022–present)
- Location: Hard Rock Stadium, Miami Gardens, Florida, U.S.
- Coordinates: 25°57′29″N 80°14′20″W
- Capacity: 65,000
- FIA Grade: 1 (Grand Prix); FE (MIA Loop)
- Broke ground: 2021; 5 years ago
- Opened: May 7, 2022; 4 years ago
- Architect: Apex Circuit Design
- Major events: Current: Formula One; Miami Grand Prix (2022–present); Formula E Miami ePrix (2026); Former: Ferrari Challenge North America (2025)

Grand Prix Circuit (2022–present)
- Surface: Asphalt
- Length: 3.363 mi (5.412 km)
- Turns: 19
- Race lap record: 1:29.708 ( (Netherlands) Max Verstappen, Red Bull Racing RB19, 2023, F1)

Extended Marina Loop (2024–present)
- Surface: Asphalt
- Length: 2.800 mi (4.506 km)
- Turns: 19
- Race lap record: 1:36.999 ( (United States) Massimo Perrina, Ferrari 296 Challenge, 2025, Ferrari Challenge)

Marina Loop (2024–present)
- Surface: Asphalt
- Length: 2.440 mi (3.927 km)
- Turns: 18

Extended MIA Loop (2024–present)
- Surface: Asphalt
- Length: 1.750 mi (2.816 km)
- Turns: 14

MIA Loop (2024–present)
- Surface: Asphalt
- Length: 1.442 mi (2.320 km)
- Turns: 13
- Race lap record: 1:02.316 ( (United Kingdom) Oliver Rowland, Nissan e-4ORCE 05, 2026, F-E)

The Miami International Autodrome is a purpose-built temporary circuit around Hard Rock Stadium and its private facilities in Miami Gardens, Florida, United States. The track is 3.363 mi (5.412 km) long and features 19 corners with an average speed in a Formula One car of around 139 mph (224 km/h) in qualifying. The track was designed by Formula One track designers, Apex Circuit Design, for the Miami Grand Prix, which was added to the Formula One calendar for the 2022 World Championship. The circuit is primarily used for Formula One events; Formula E began to use a modified layout of the circuit for the Miami ePrix from the 2025–26 season onward.

== History ==
The track had been proposed as early as October 2019 with an initial design at the venue, with up to 75 circuit designs having been considered, and 36 being simulated. The stadium's owner, Stephen Ross, had been attempting to attract Formula One for several years before the initial design was published. Organizers for the Grand Prix at Hard Rock Stadium had an agreement in principle to host a race from 2021, but this was delayed. Miami Gardens commissioners had initially voted against the track's creation, but this was reversed on April 14, 2021. On September 2, 2021, the track was officially named as the "Miami International Autodrome".

In September 2024, it was announced that four new layouts were constructed to utilize the circuit all year in order to host other racing events besides the Formula One.

The circuit also hosted the non-championship Evo Sessions for the Formula E World Championship in March 2025, in which celebrities and other sports personalities from all backgrounds tested the current Formula E GEN3 Evo car with the assistance of one of their team's current drivers. The circuit layout used was a shortened (MIA Loop) layout to accommodate for the reduced range of a Formula E car compared to a Formula One car.

== Circuit ==
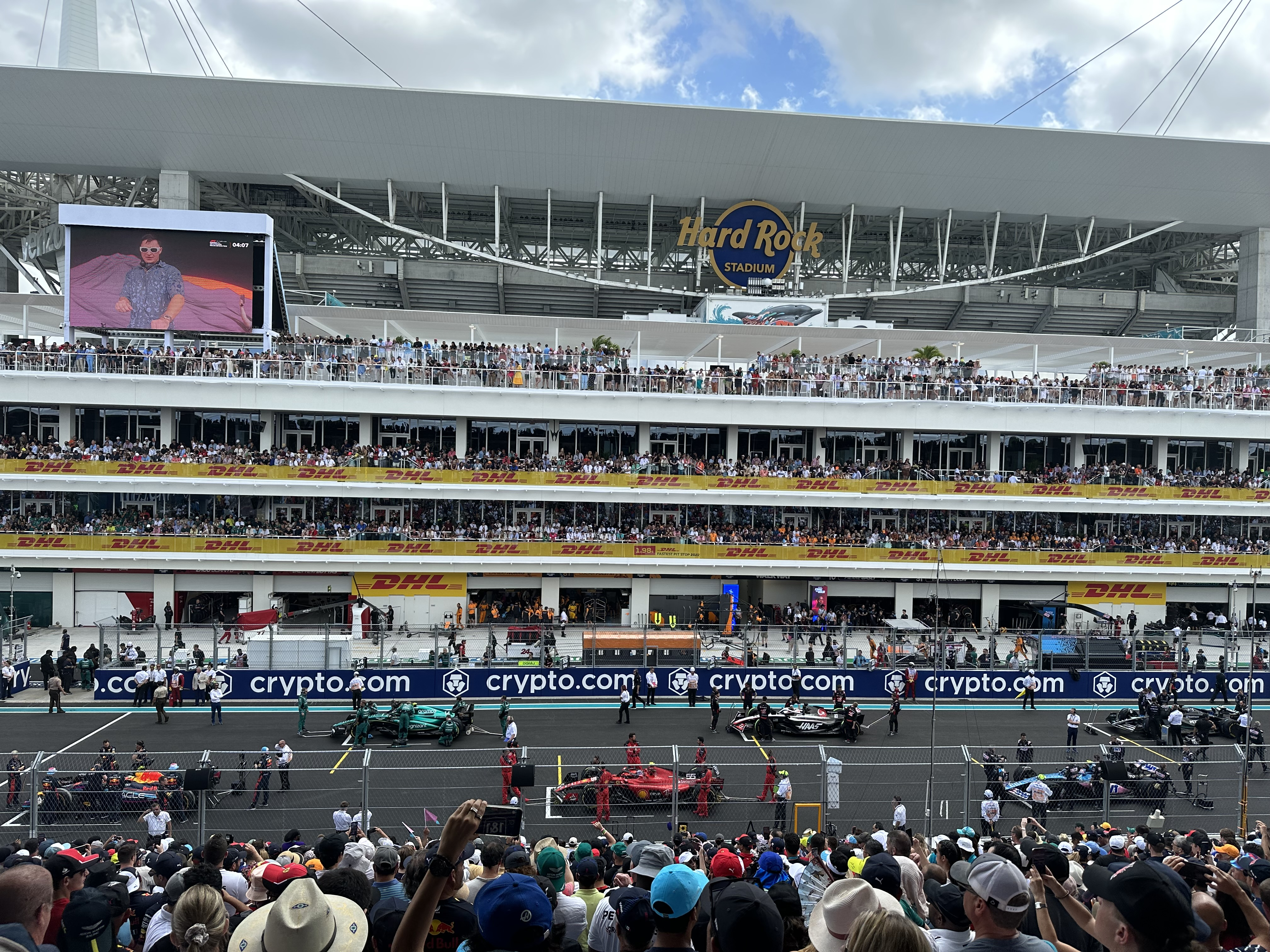
A view of the Miami Grand Prix start/finish and paddock.

The circuit is around the private grounds of Hard Rock Stadium, and uses new and existing roads within. The permanent asphalt pathways of the circuit are integrated into the Hard Rock Stadium parking areas. The circuit is a temporary circuit, and does not use any public streets that are located around Hard Rock Stadium, though it does cross public roads. Each year and a few weeks before the race weekend, the circuit and its safety features are assembled just for the race weekend. After the race weekend, the circuit is dismantled and Hard Rock Stadium grounds are converted back to normal.

== Layout configurations ==
Miami International Autodrome layout configurations
Grand Prix Circuit (2022–present)

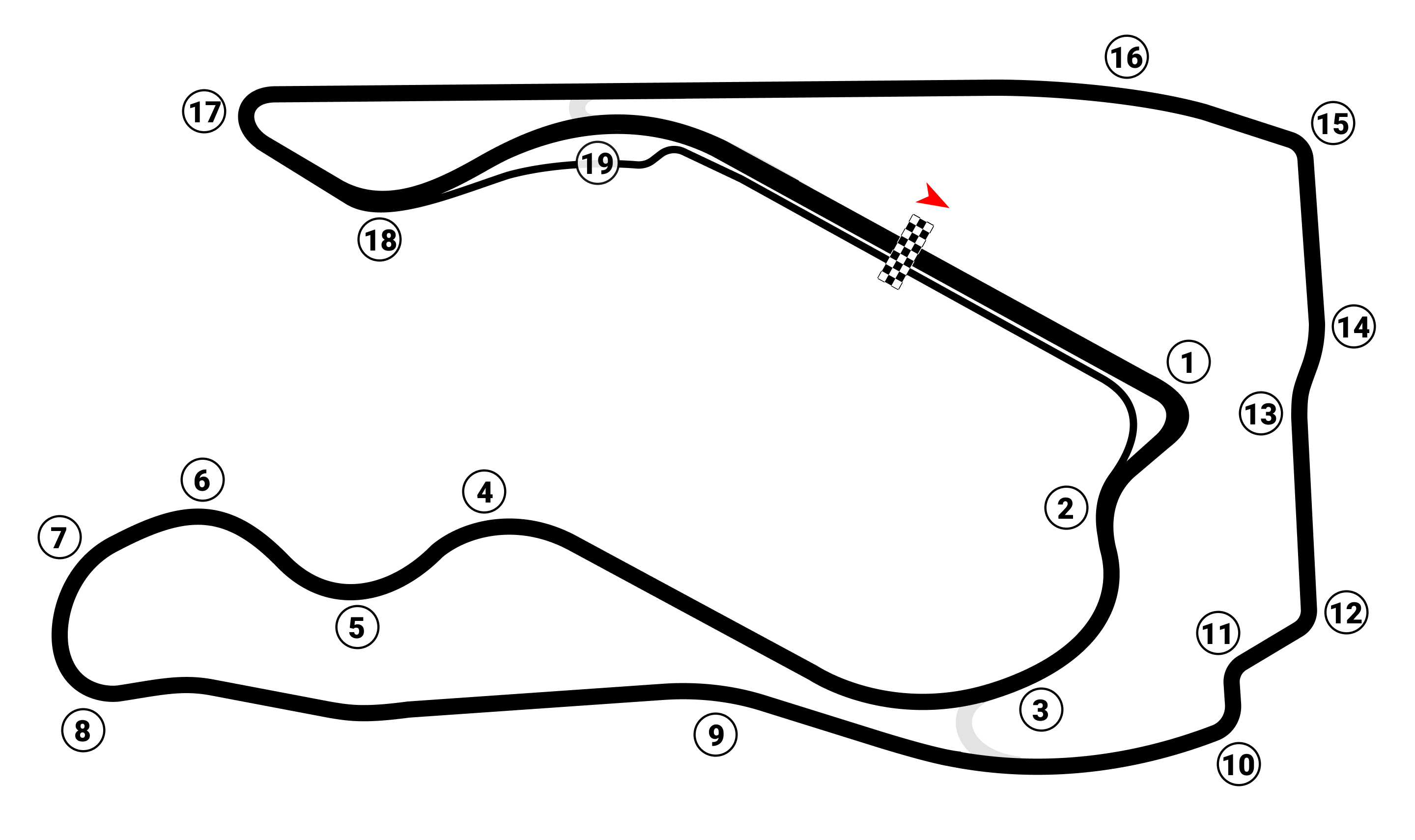
Extended Marina Loop (2024–present)

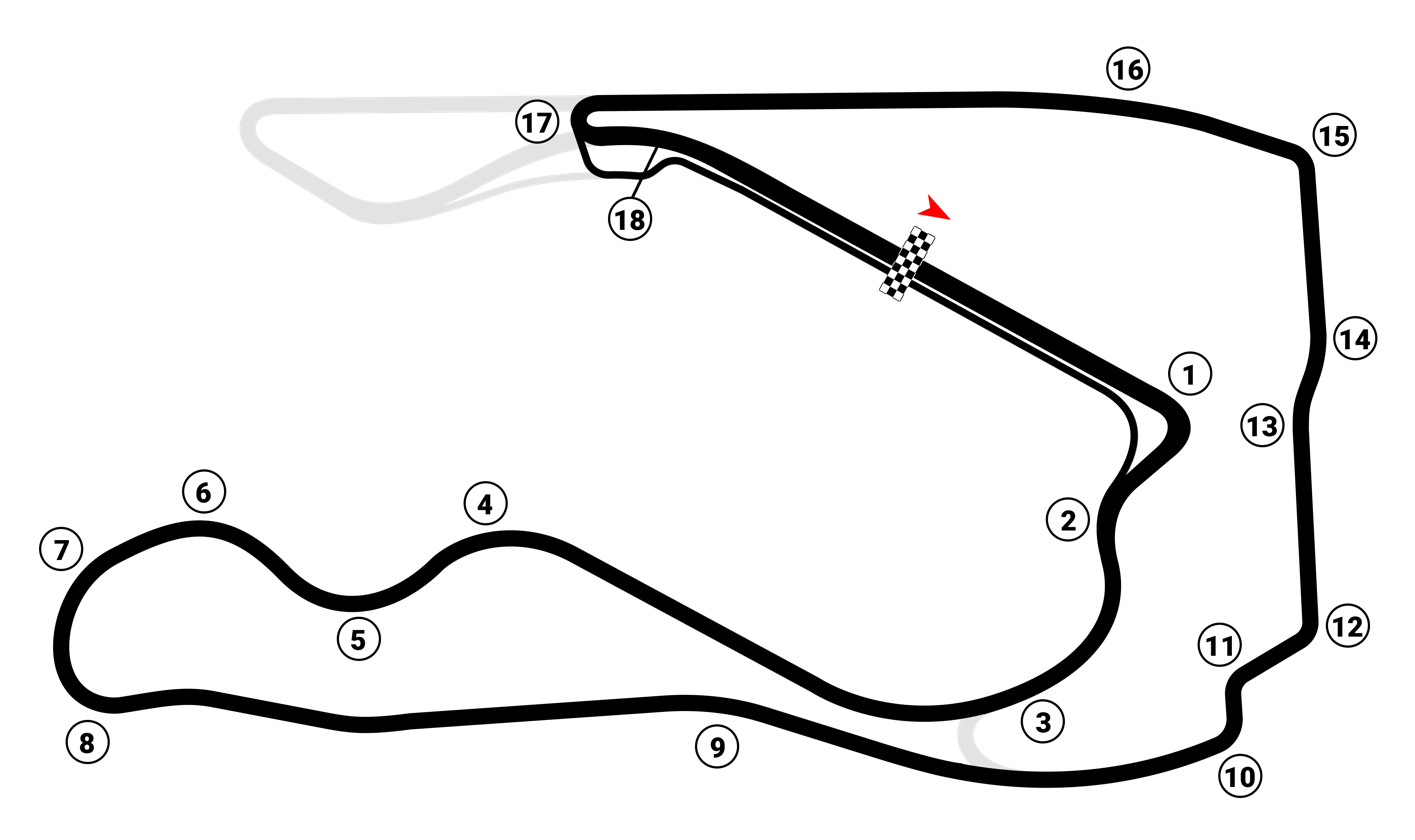
Marina Loop (2024–present)

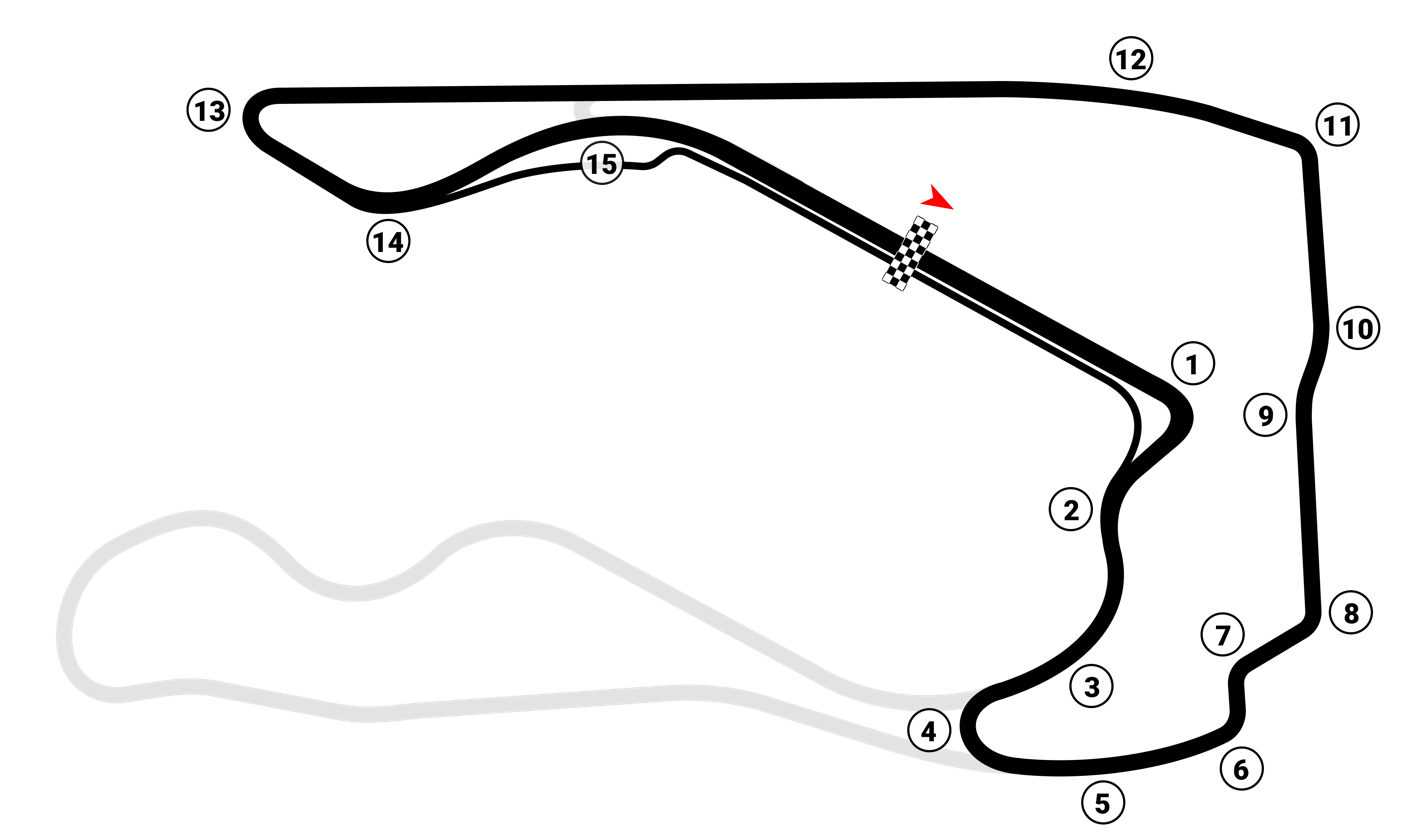
Extended MIA Loop (2024–present)

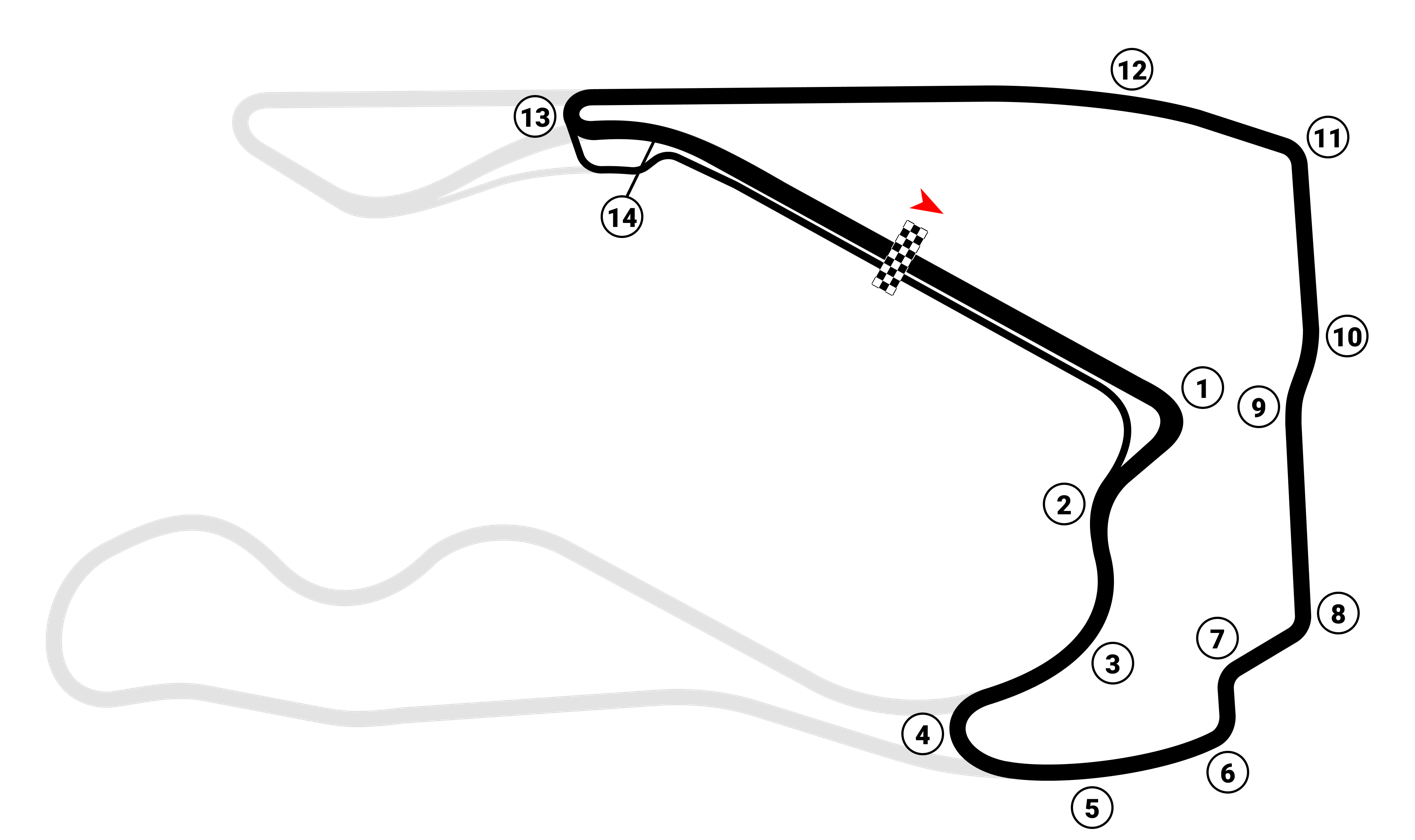
MIA Loop (2024–present)

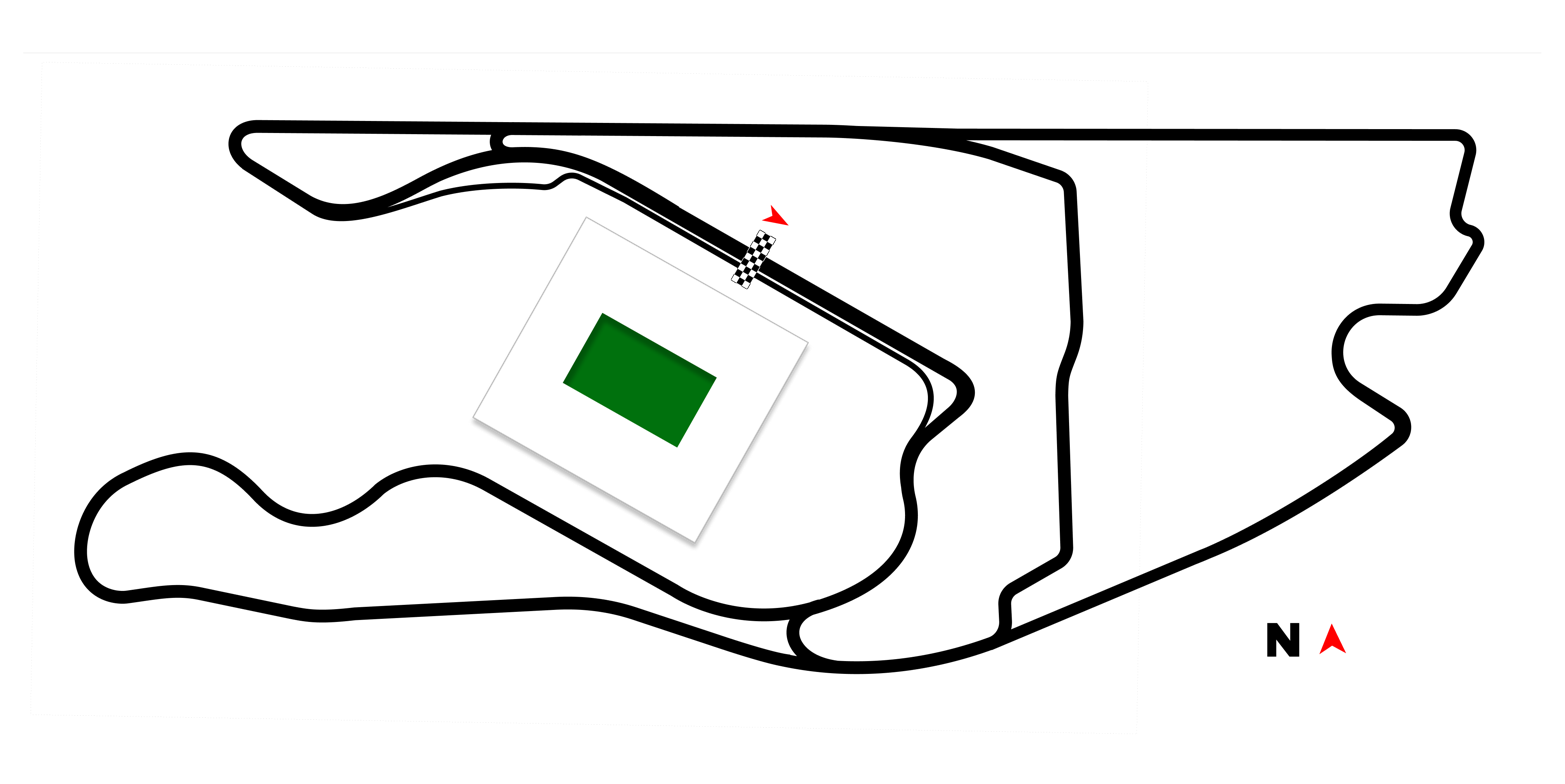
All layouts of Miami International Autodrome

== Events ==
Current

- January: Formula E Miami ePrix
- May: Formula One Miami Grand Prix, FIA Formula 2 Championship, Porsche Carrera Cup North America, McLaren Trophy America

Former

- F1 Academy (2024–2025)
- Ferrari Challenge North America (2025)
- Porsche Sprint Challenge North America (2022)
- W Series (2022)

== Lap records ==
As of May 2026, the fastest official race lap records at the Miami International Autodrome are listed as:

Category	Time	Driver	Vehicle	Event
Grand Prix Circuit (2022–present): 3.363 mi (5.412 km)
Formula One	1:29.708	Max Verstappen	Red Bull Racing RB19	2023 Miami Grand Prix
FIA Formula 2 Championship	1:41.932	Noel León	Dallara F2 2024	2026 Miami Formula 2 round
Formula Regional	1:56.406	Abbi Pulling	Tatuus F3 T-318	2022 Miami W Series round
Porsche Carrera Cup	1:56.693	Riley Dickinson	Porsche 911 (992 I) GT3 Cup	2023 Miami Porsche Carrera Cup North America round
McLaren Trophy	1:57.180	Jeff Cook	McLaren Artura Trophy	2026 Miami McLaren Trophy America round
Formula 4	1:59.322	Bianca Bustamante	Tatuus F4-T421	2024 Miami F1 Academy round
Extended Marina Loop (2024–present): 2.800 mi (4.506 km)
Ferrari Challenge	1:36.999	Massimo Perrina	Ferrari 296 Challenge	2025 Miami Ferrari Challenge North America round
MIA Loop (2024–present): 1.442 mi (2.320 km)
Formula E	1:02.316	Oliver Rowland	Nissan e-4ORCE 05	2026 Miami ePrix
