= 2023 Australian Grand Prix =

Formula One motor race

Race 3 of 22 (Note: At the time of the event Formula One planned to hold twenty-three Grands Prix.) in the 2023 Formula One World Championship
| ← Previous race | Next race → |
- Layout of the Albert Park Circuit

Race details
- Date: 2 April 2023
- Official name: Formula 1 Rolex Australian Grand Prix 2023
- Location: Albert Park Circuit; Melbourne, Victoria, Australia
- Course: Street Circuit
- Course length: 5.278 km (3.280 miles)
- Distance: 58 laps, 306.124 km (190.217 miles)
- Weather: Sunny
- Attendance: 444,631

Pole position
| Driver | (Netherlands) Max Verstappen | Red Bull Racing-Honda RBPT |
- Time: 1:16.732

Fastest lap
| Driver | (Mexico) Sergio Pérez | Red Bull Racing-Honda RBPT |
- Time: 1:20.235 on lap 53

Podium
| First | (Netherlands) Max Verstappen | Red Bull Racing-Honda RBPT |
| Second | (United Kingdom) Lewis Hamilton | Mercedes |
| Third | (Spain) Fernando Alonso | Aston Martin-Mercedes |

The 2023 Australian Grand Prix (officially known as the Formula 1 Rolex Australian Grand Prix 2023) was a Formula One motor race held on 2 April 2023 at the Albert Park Circuit in Melbourne, Victoria, Australia. It was the third round of the 2023 Formula One World Championship.

The race was won by Max Verstappen, with Lewis Hamilton in second and Fernando Alonso third. The event set at the time a new attendance record at the circuit for the weekend with 444,631 spectators, making it the most attended sporting event ever in Melbourne. It was the highest number since the 440,000 attendance recorded at the 2022 United States Grand Prix. The Grand Prix broke the record for most red flags, with three.

== Background ==
The event was held across the weekend of 31 March – 2 April. It was the third round of the 2023 Formula One World Championship.

=== Championship standings before the race ===
Going into the weekend, Max Verstappen was leading the World Drivers' Championship with 44 points, one point from his teammate Sergio Pérez, second, and 14 from Fernando Alonso in third. Red Bull Racing, with 87 points, led the Constructors' Championship from Aston Martin and Mercedes, who both had 38 points.

=== Entrants ===
The drivers and teams were the same as the season entry list with no additional stand-in drivers for the race.

=== Tyre choices ===
Tyre supplier Pirelli brought the C2, C3, and C4 tyre compounds (designated hard, medium, and soft, respectively) for teams to use at the event.

=== Track changes ===
Following the 2021 redevelopment of the Albert Park Circuit and the removal of the turn 9–10 chicane, a fourth DRS zone was proposed and installed between turns 8 and 9. After the first day of practice session during the 2022 Australian Grand Prix weekend, the new DRS zone was scrapped due to safety concerns raised by some of the drivers. The Grand Prix chief Andrew Westacott told Melbourne's Herald Sun that the DRS zone would be reimplemented for this edition after receiving positive feedback from the FIA and Formula One.

== Qualifying ==
Qualifying was held on 1 April 2023, starting at 16:00 local time (UTC+11).

=== Qualifying report ===
In the first segment, Sergio Pérez locked up as the result of a technical issue, causing a red flag after he got stuck in the gravel trap. He was unable to set a representative time and subsequently joined Oscar Piastri, Zhou Guanyu, Logan Sargeant and Valtteri Bottas in being knocked out of the session.

During the second session, Lando Norris, who qualified thirteenth, went into the gravel, although he was able to rejoin the track; he joined Esteban Ocon, Yuki Tsunoda, Kevin Magnussen and Nyck de Vries being knocked out in the second segment. In the third session, Max Verstappen reported minor issues with his car, eventually taking pole position with George Russell taking second ahead of his teammate Lewis Hamilton.

Charles Leclerc, who qualified seventh, criticised his own driving, saying "I wasn't on it. I wasn't driving well. I wasn't putting everything together, so that was my fault."

=== Qualifying classification ===
| Pos. | No. | Driver | Constructor | Qualifying times | | | Final grid |
| Pos. | No. | Driver | Constructor | Q1 | Q2 | Q3 | Final grid |
|---|---|---|---|---|---|---|---|
| 1 | 1 | (Netherlands) Max Verstappen | Red Bull Racing-Honda RBPT | 1:17.384 | 1:17.056 | 1:16.732 | 1 |
| 2 | 63 | (United Kingdom) George Russell | Mercedes | 1:17.654 | 1:17.513 | 1:16.968 | 2 |
| 3 | 44 | (United Kingdom) Lewis Hamilton | Mercedes | 1:17.689 | 1:17.551 | 1:17.104 | 3 |
| 4 | 14 | (Spain) Fernando Alonso | Aston Martin Aramco-Mercedes | 1:17.832 | 1:17.283 | 1:17.139 | 4 |
| 5 | 55 | (Spain) Carlos Sainz Jr. | Ferrari | 1:17.928 | 1:17.349 | 1:17.270 | 5 |
| 6 | 18 | (Canada) Lance Stroll | Aston Martin Aramco-Mercedes | 1:17.873 | 1:17.616 | 1:17.308 | 6 |
| 7 | 16 | (Monaco) Charles Leclerc | Ferrari | 1:18.218 | 1:17.390 | 1:17.369 | 7 |
| 8 | 23 | (Thailand) Alexander Albon | Williams-Mercedes | 1:17.962 | 1:17.761 | 1:17.609 | 8 |
| 9 | 10 | (France) Pierre Gasly | Alpine-Renault | 1:18.312 | 1:17.574 | 1:17.675 | 9 |
| 10 | 27 | (Germany) Nico Hülkenberg | Haas-Ferrari | 1:18.029 | 1:17.412 | 1:17.735 | 10 |
| 11 | 31 | (France) Esteban Ocon | Alpine-Renault | 1:17.770 | 1:17.768 | N/A | 11 |
| 12 | 22 | (Japan) Yuki Tsunoda | AlphaTauri-Honda RBPT | 1:18.471 | 1:18.099 | N/A | 12 |
| 13 | 4 | (United Kingdom) Lando Norris | McLaren-Mercedes | 1:18.243 | 1:18.119 | N/A | 13 |
| 14 | 20 | (Denmark) Kevin Magnussen | Haas-Ferrari | 1:18.159 | 1:18.129 | N/A | 14 |
| 15 | 21 | (Netherlands) Nyck de Vries | AlphaTauri-Honda RBPT | 1:18.450 | 1:18.335 | N/A | 15 |
| 16 | 81 | (Australia) Oscar Piastri | McLaren-Mercedes | 1:18.517 | N/A | N/A | 16 |
| 17 | 24 | (China) Zhou Guanyu | Alfa Romeo-Ferrari | 1:18.540 | N/A | N/A | 17 |
| 18 | 2 | (United States) Logan Sargeant | Williams-Mercedes | 1:18.557 | N/A | N/A | 18 |
| 19 | 77 | (Finland) Valtteri Bottas | Alfa Romeo-Ferrari | 1:18.714 | N/A | N/A | PL^{1} |
107% time: 1:22.800
| — | 11 | (Mexico) Sergio Pérez | Red Bull Racing-Honda RBPT | No time | N/A | N/A | PL^{2} |

Notes

- ^1 – Valtteri Bottas qualified 19th, but he was required to start the race from the pit lane as the setup of the suspension was changed while the car was under parc fermé.
- ^2 – Sergio Pérez failed to set a time during Q1. He was permitted to race at the stewards' discretion. He was required to start the race from the pit lane as the new power unit elements and the setup of the suspension were changed while the car was under parc fermé without the permission of the technical delegate.

== Race ==
The race was held on 2 April 2023, starting at 15:00 local time (UTC+10).

=== Race report ===
George Russell passed pole-sitter Max Verstappen, who suffered wheelspin, to take the lead of the race, Hamilton passed him further round the circuit. Charles Leclerc spun into the gravel at turn three following contact with Lance Stroll, resulting in Leclerc's retirement from the race and the safety car being called out.

The race restarted on lap 4. Three laps later, on lap 7, Alexander Albon lost control of his car and crashed heavily at turn seven, causing the safety car to be called out again; Russell changed his tyres for fresh hard compounds, allowing his teammate Lewis Hamilton to inherit the lead. Carlos Sainz Jr. followed suit moments later. The race was red-flagged to allow marshals to clean up the debris left by Albon's car and gravel that had been strewn on track. As Russell and Sainz had just changed their tyres in the safety car period, this meant they lost out, as rivals were able to change their tyres during the stoppage.

Hamilton kept his lead at the second restart, but would soon lose the lead into turn 9 as Verstappen overtook him with DRS. Russell overtook Pierre Gasly for fourth on lap 14, with Sainz overtaking Lance Stroll on the following lap. On lap 18, Russell's power unit caught fire, causing Mercedes's first mechanical retirement of the season and causing a brief virtual safety car period. Verstappen would go on to lead the race comfortably, despite a brief moment on lap 46 where he understeered into the grass coming into the final corners. He managed to recover and maintain first, despite losing several seconds. By the closing stages of the race, Verstappen led by over ten seconds over Hamilton. The race was red-flagged once again on lap 55 after Kevin Magnussen's right-rear wheel made contact with the wall at turn two, damaging his rear suspension and causing the tyre to detach.

The race was restarted again with Verstappen keeping his lead. As the cars reached turn 1, Sainz pushed Fernando Alonso into a spin, the Alpines of Gasly and Esteban Ocon ended their races in the wall after a heavy collision, and Nyck de Vries and Logan Sargeant found themselves in the gravel and out of the race; Stroll, despite also running into the gravel, managed to recover his car and continue the race. The race was red-flagged for a third time.

The marshals restarted the race on the final lap in the order of the previous start, minus the cars that had been eliminated, as the cars had not yet the reached the first timing line. The race resumed via rolling start at the end of lap 58, which coincided with the chequered flag being shown at the finish line; Max Verstappen won his first Australian Grand Prix ahead of Hamilton and Alonso; Pérez finished fifth after a pit lane start. Oscar Piastri finished his home race in eighth and in the points alongside teammate Lando Norris, marking McLaren's first points finish of the season. AlphaTauri scored their first points of the season courtesy of Yuki Tsunoda's 10th-place finish. Lewis Hamilton scored his and Mercedes' first podium of the year.

=== Post-race ===
The stewards deemed that no investigation was necessary into the opening lap contact between Stroll and Leclerc. After an investigation of Gasly's crash with Ocon, no further action was taken.

Mercedes conducted an investigation of Russell's power unit following his retirement and discovered that a piece of debris had lodged itself inside one of the cylinders, causing it to fail. This is the second Mercedes-engine mechanical issue of the season after Norris suffered from a loss of engine hydraulic pressure at the 2023 Bahrain Grand Prix.

During the race, Sainz was handed a five-second penalty for the collision with Alonso on the second restart. Following the race, this penalty was added to his elapsed race time, which dropped him from fourth place down to twelfth place in the final classification. Sainz criticised the penalty over team radio and following the race, stating that it was "the most unfair penalty I've ever seen in my life". Alonso, with whom Sainz collided to earn the penalty, agreed that it was "too harsh". A week after the race, Ferrari lodged further requests for review, though the appeal was ultimately rejected by the racing stewards. Haas lodged a protest following the race regarding its provisional classification, where both Hülkenberg and Haas could have achieved their first podium finish with Sainz's five-second penalty had the last restart order been determined differently. The protest was rejected by the racing stewards.

Two incidents involving spectators were reported after the race. After Magnussen crashed out of the race, a fan was struck by loose debris from the stricken Haas car, lacerating his arm. Another incident involved a crowd of spectators gaining unauthorised access to the track before the race had finished, causing a fourth red flag to be shown after the chequered flag. The organisers of the Australian Grand Prix were found in breach of the FIA's sporting code.

The FIA came under scrutiny from several drivers due to its handling of the red flags and restarts, which had affected the strategies of Russell, Sainz, Verstappen and Hülkenberg; the Haas driver had been running as high as fourth place before the third red flag came out, with the subsequent restart dropping him down to seventh.

=== Race classification ===
| Pos. | No. | Driver | Constructor | Laps | Time/Retired | Grid | Points |
|---|---|---|---|---|---|---|---|
| 1 | 1 | (Netherlands) Max Verstappen | Red Bull Racing-Honda RBPT | 58 | 2:32:38.371 | 1 | 25 |
| 2 | 44 | (United Kingdom) Lewis Hamilton | Mercedes | 58 | +0.179 | 3 | 18 |
| 3 | 14 | (Spain) Fernando Alonso | Aston Martin Aramco-Mercedes | 58 | +0.769 | 4 | 15 |
| 4 | 18 | (Canada) Lance Stroll | Aston Martin Aramco-Mercedes | 58 | +3.082 | 6 | 12 |
| 5 | 11 | (Mexico) Sergio Pérez | Red Bull Racing-Honda RBPT | 58 | +3.320 | PL | 11^{a} |
| 6 | 4 | (United Kingdom) Lando Norris | McLaren-Mercedes | 58 | +3.701 | 13 | 8 |
| 7 | 27 | (Germany) Nico Hülkenberg | Haas-Ferrari | 58 | +4.939 | 10 | 6 |
| 8 | 81 | (Australia) Oscar Piastri | McLaren-Mercedes | 58 | +5.382 | 16 | 4 |
| 9 | 24 | (China) Zhou Guanyu | Alfa Romeo-Ferrari | 58 | +5.713 | 17 | 2 |
| 10 | 22 | (Japan) Yuki Tsunoda | AlphaTauri-Honda RBPT | 58 | +6.052 | 12 | 1 |
| 11 | 77 | (Finland) Valtteri Bottas | Alfa Romeo-Ferrari | 58 | +6.513 | PL | |
| 12 | 55 | (Spain) Carlos Sainz Jr. | Ferrari | 58 | +6.594^{b} | 5 | |
| 13^{c} | 10 | (France) Pierre Gasly | Alpine-Renault | 56 | Collision | 9 | |
| 14^{c} | 31 | (France) Esteban Ocon | Alpine-Renault | 56 | Collision | 11 | |
| 15^{c} | 21 | (Netherlands) Nyck de Vries | AlphaTauri-Honda RBPT | 56 | Collision | 15 | |
| 16^{c} | 2 | (United States) Logan Sargeant | Williams-Mercedes | 56 | Collision | 18 | |
| 17^{c} | 20 | (Denmark) Kevin Magnussen | Haas-Ferrari | 52 | Accident | 14 | |
| Ret | 63 | (United Kingdom) George Russell | Mercedes | 17 | Engine | 2 | |
| Ret | 23 | (Thailand) Alexander Albon | Williams-Mercedes | 6 | Accident | 8 | |
| Ret | 16 | (Monaco) Charles Leclerc | Ferrari | 0 | Collision | 7 | |
Fastest lap: (Mexico) Sergio Pérez (Red Bull Racing-Honda RBPT) – 1:20.235 (lap 53)

Notes

- ^a – Includes one point for fastest lap.
- ^b – Carlos Sainz Jr. finished fourth, but he received a five-second time penalty for causing a collision with Fernando Alonso.
- ^c – Pierre Gasly, Esteban Ocon, Nyck de Vries, Logan Sargeant and Kevin Magnussen were classified as they completed more than 90% of the race distance.

== Championship standings after the race ==
Drivers' Championship standings

| | Pos. | Driver | Points |
|---|---|---|---|
| | 1 | (Netherlands) Max Verstappen | 69 |
| | 2 | (Mexico) Sergio Pérez | 54 |
| | 3 | (Spain) Fernando Alonso | 45 |
| 1 | 4 | (United Kingdom) Lewis Hamilton | 38 |
| 1 | 5 | (Spain) Carlos Sainz Jr. | 20 |

Constructors' Championship standings

| | Pos. | Constructor | Points |
|---|---|---|---|
| | 1 | (Austria) Red Bull Racing-Honda RBPT | 123 |
| | 2 | (United Kingdom) Aston Martin Aramco-Mercedes | 65 |
| | 3 | (Germany) Mercedes | 56 |
| | 4 | (Italy) Ferrari | 26 |
| 5 | 5 | (United Kingdom) McLaren-Mercedes | 12 |

- Note: Only the top five positions are included for both sets of standings.

== See also ==
- 2023 Melbourne Formula 2 round
- 2023 Melbourne Formula 3 round

== Notes ==
| Previous race: 2023 Saudi Arabian Grand Prix | FIA Formula One World Championship; 2023 season | Next race: 2023 Azerbaijan Grand Prix |
| Previous race: 2022 Australian Grand Prix | Australian Grand Prix | Next race: 2024 Australian Grand Prix |
