= Logan Sargeant =

American racing driver (born 2000)

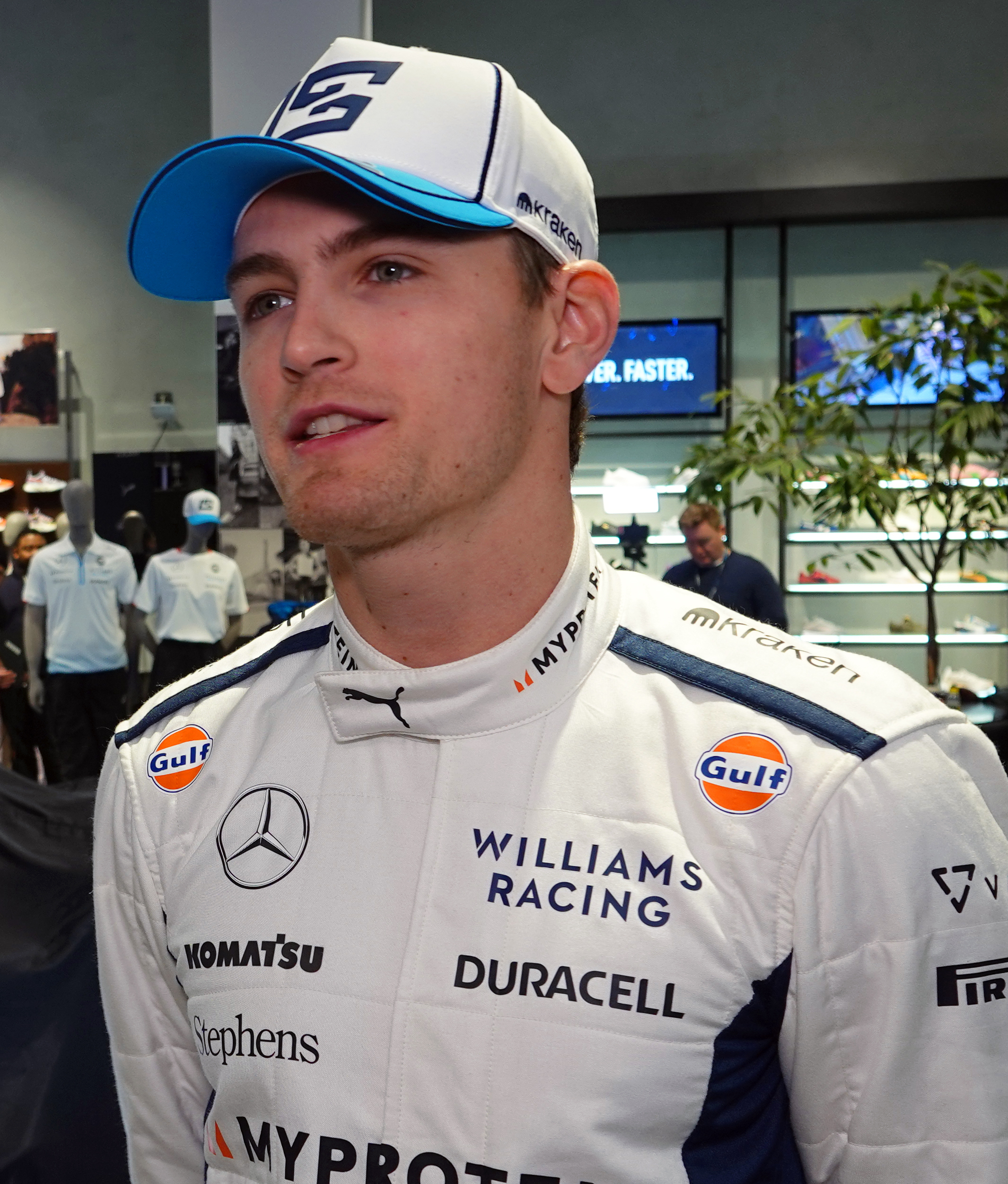
- Sargeant in 2024
- Born: Logan Hunter Sargeant; December 31, 2000 (age 25); Fort Lauderdale, Florida, U.S.
- Relatives: Dalton Sargeant (brother); Harry Sargeant III (uncle)

FIA World Endurance Championship career
- Debut season: 2026
- Current team: Ford Racing
- Categorisation: FIA Gold (until 2025); FIA Platinum (2026–)
- Former teams: Proton Competition
- Starts: 8
- Wins: 0
- Podiums: 0
- Poles: 0
- Fastest laps: 0
- Best finish: 21st in 2026 (LMGT3)

Formula One World Championship career
- Nationality: (United States) American
- Active years: 2023–2024
- Team: Williams
- Car number: 2
- Entries: 37 (36 starts)
- Championships: 0
- Wins: 0
- Podiums: 0
- Career points: 1
- Pole positions: 0
- Fastest laps: 0
- First entry: 2023 Bahrain Grand Prix
- Last entry: 2024 Dutch Grand Prix

Previous series
- 2025–2026; 2023–2024; 2021–2022; 2021; 2019–2021; 2017–2018; 2017–2018; 2017; 2016–2017: IMSA SportsCar Championship; Formula One; FIA Formula 2; European Le Mans Series; FIA Formula 3; Formula Renault Eurocup; Formula Renault NEC; F4 British; F4 UAE

Logan Hunter Sargeant (born December 31, 2000) is an American racing driver who is set to compete in the FIA World Endurance Championship for Ford. He previously competed in the LMGT3 class in the FIA World Endurance Championship for Proton Competition. Sargeant competed in Formula One from 2023 to 2024.

Born and raised in Fort Lauderdale, Florida, Sargeant is the nephew of billionaire business magnate Harry Sargeant III and the younger brother of stock car driver Dalton. After a successful karting career—culminating in his victory at the junior World Championship in 2015—Sargeant graduated to junior formulae. Achieving top-three finishes in the F4 UAE and British Championships, followed by several wins in the 2018 Formula Renault Eurocup, Sargeant progressed to FIA Formula 3 in 2019; he finished third the following season with Prema. He then moved to FIA Formula 2 in 2022, finishing fourth in his full debut season with Carlin.

A member of the Williams Driver Academy from 2021 to 2022, Sargeant signed for Williams in 2023, making his Formula One debut at the Bahrain Grand Prix and scoring his only championship point at the United States Grand Prix. Retaining his seat for his 2024 campaign, Sargeant was replaced by Franco Colapinto after the Dutch Grand Prix following a series of high-profile accidents.

== Early and personal life ==
Sargeant was born on December 31, 2000, in Fort Lauderdale, Florida, U.S. His uncle is shipping magnate Harry Sargeant III. He is also the younger brother of former NASCAR driver Dalton Sargeant.

Sargeant fishes as a hobby.

Sargeant is currently managed by British race car driver Oliver Gavin through the latter's Oliver Gavin Motorsport Management company.

== Junior racing career ==
=== Karting ===
Sargeant began his motorsport career in karting in 2008. In his first year, he competed in the Rotax Micro Max class in regional and national championships, finishing third in the Florida Winter Tour and the Rotax Max Challenge USA. Sargeant later moved to Europe with his family to compete karting. There he took art in the ROK Cup International Final, Trofeo Delle Industrie, and WSK Euro Series.

In 2015, Sargeant won the CIK-FIA World KFJ Championship, becoming the first American to win an FIA Karting World Championship title since Lake Speed in 1978. Sargeant secured his first senior karting title in the 2016 WSK Champions Cup, where he competed in the OK class.

=== Formula 4 ===
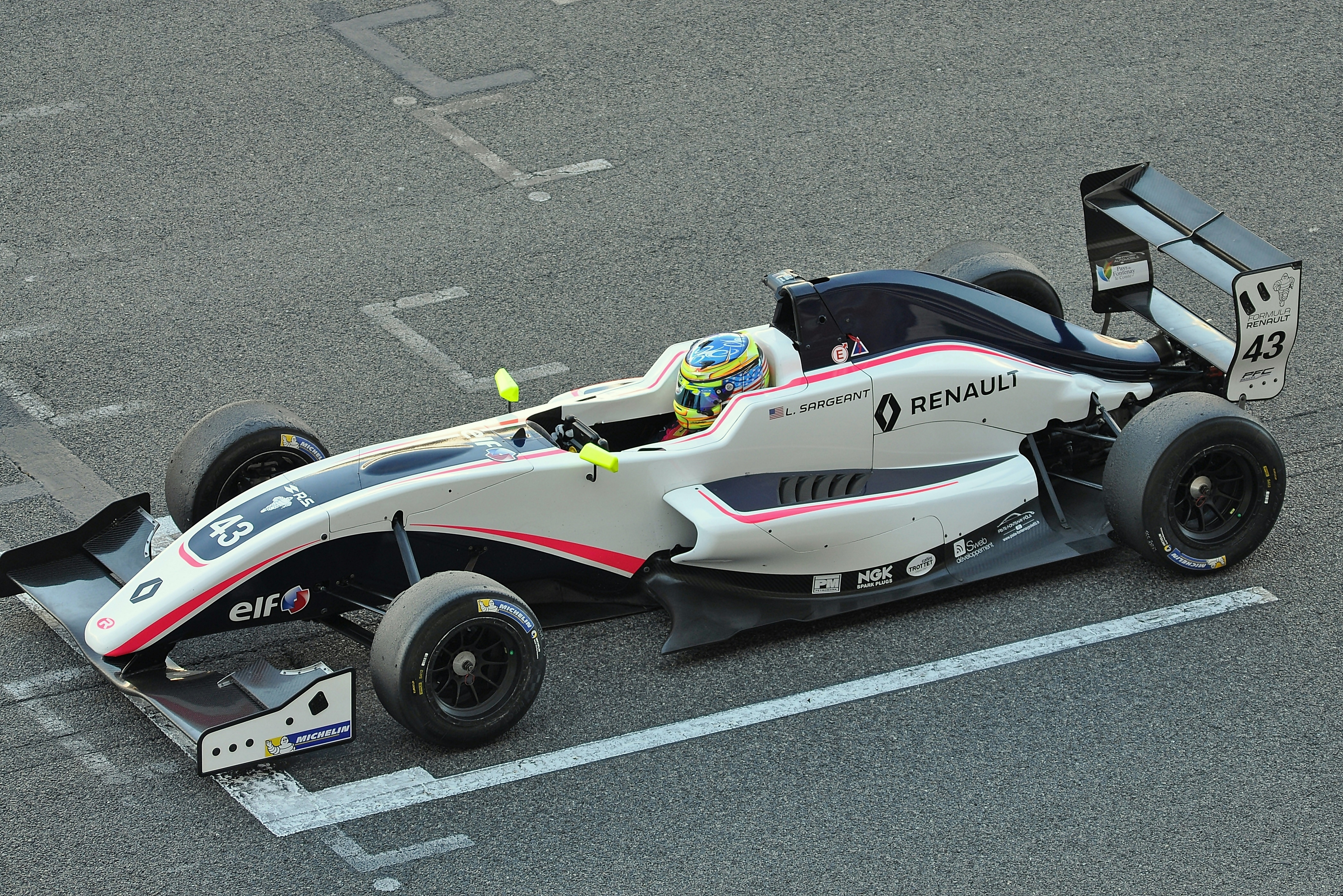
Sargeant racing in the 2017 Formula Renault Eurocup

In the winter of 2016-17, Sargeant made his single-seater car racing debut in the Formula 4 UAE Championship with Team Motopark. Although he did not win any races, he was on the podium in fifteen of the eighteen official races and finished second in the standings behind teammate Jonathan Aberdein. In 2017, Sargeant joined Carlin to compete in the F4 British Championship. He achieved ten podium finishes in 30 races, including two race wins at Rockingham and Silverstone, and finished third in the standings behind Oscar Piastri and teammate and dominant champion Jamie Caroline.

=== Formula Renault Eurocup ===
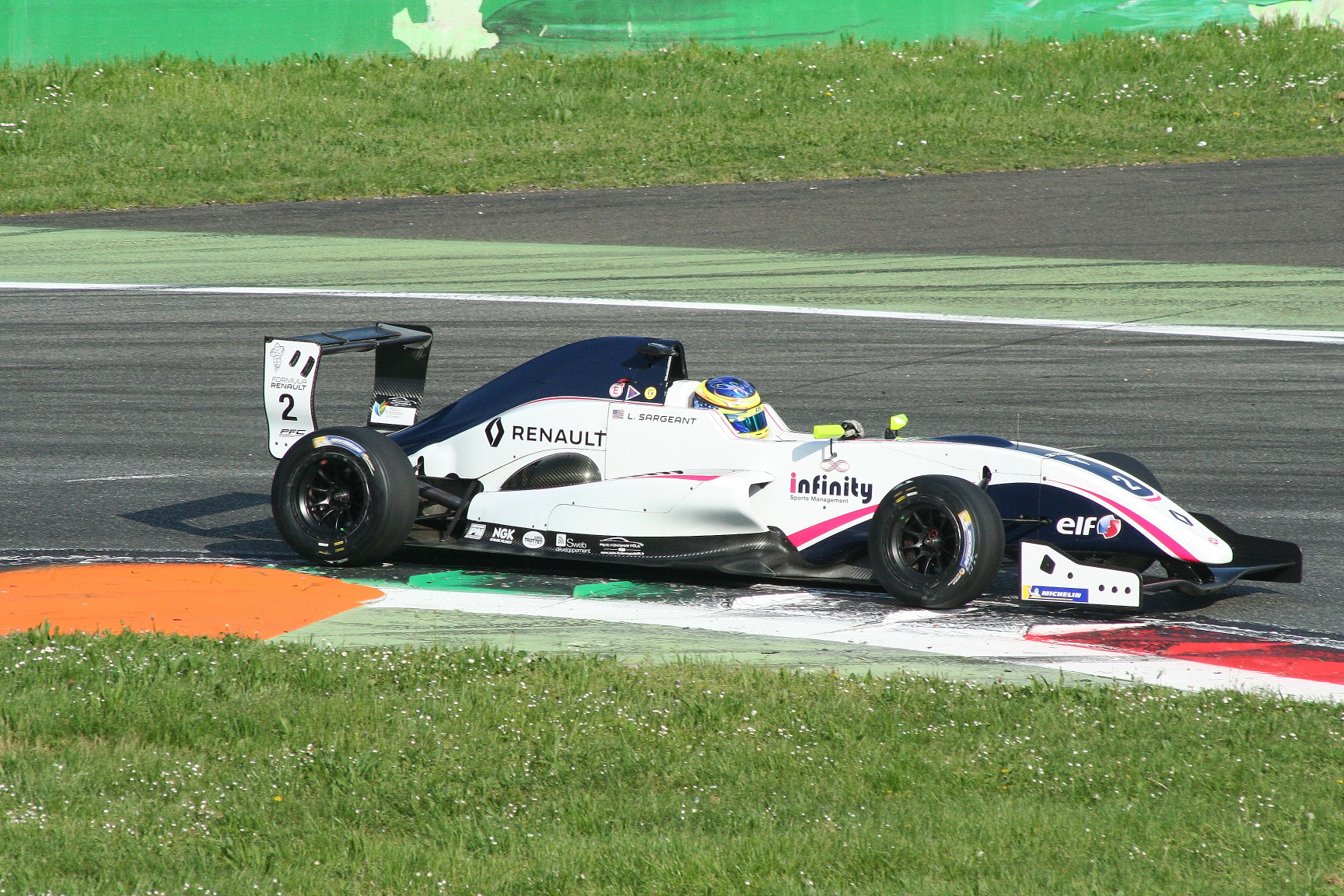
Sargeant racing in the 2018 Formula Renault Eurocup

In 2018, Sargeant made the full-time switch to the Formula Renault Eurocup with R-ace GP. He won the season-opening race at Circuit Paul Ricard and later added victories at the Nürburgring and the season finale at the Circuit de Barcelona-Catalunya. With 218 points, Sargeant finished fourth in the championship behind Yifei Ye, Christian Lundgaard and teammate and champion Max Fewtrell, and ahead of teammates Victor Martins and Charles Milesi. Sargeant was the second-highest placed rookie that season, behind Lundgaard.

=== FIA Formula 3 Championship ===
==== 2019 ====
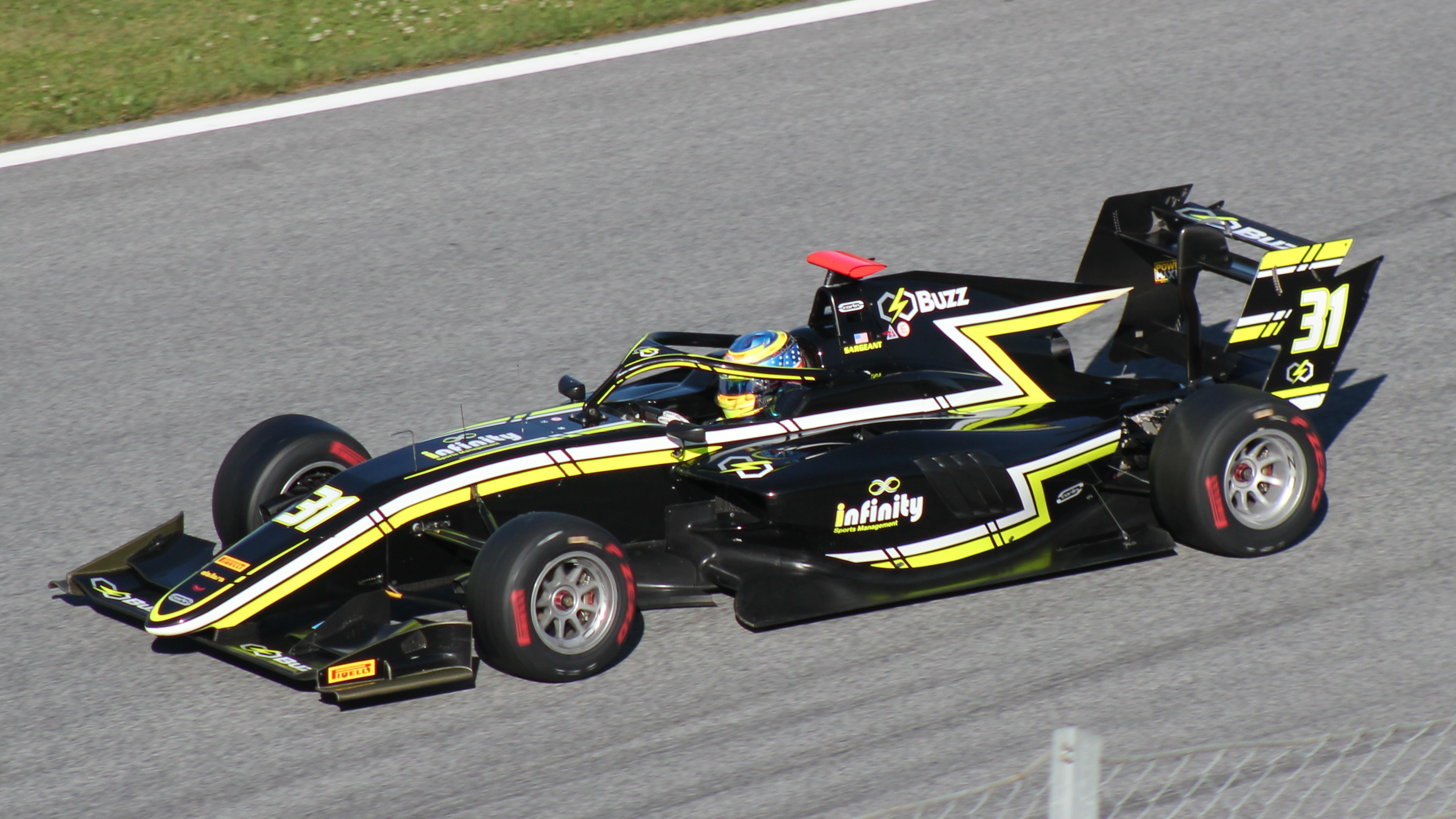
Sargeant with Carlin in 2019

Sargeant returned to Carlin to contest the 2019 FIA Formula 3 Championship, joining Teppei Natori and future Formula 2 rival Felipe Drugovich at the team. Sargeant scored points on four occasions, with top finishes of eighth place at Circuit Paul Ricard and the Hungaroring. He ended the season 19th in the championship with five points; Drugovich scored eight points and Natori one point.

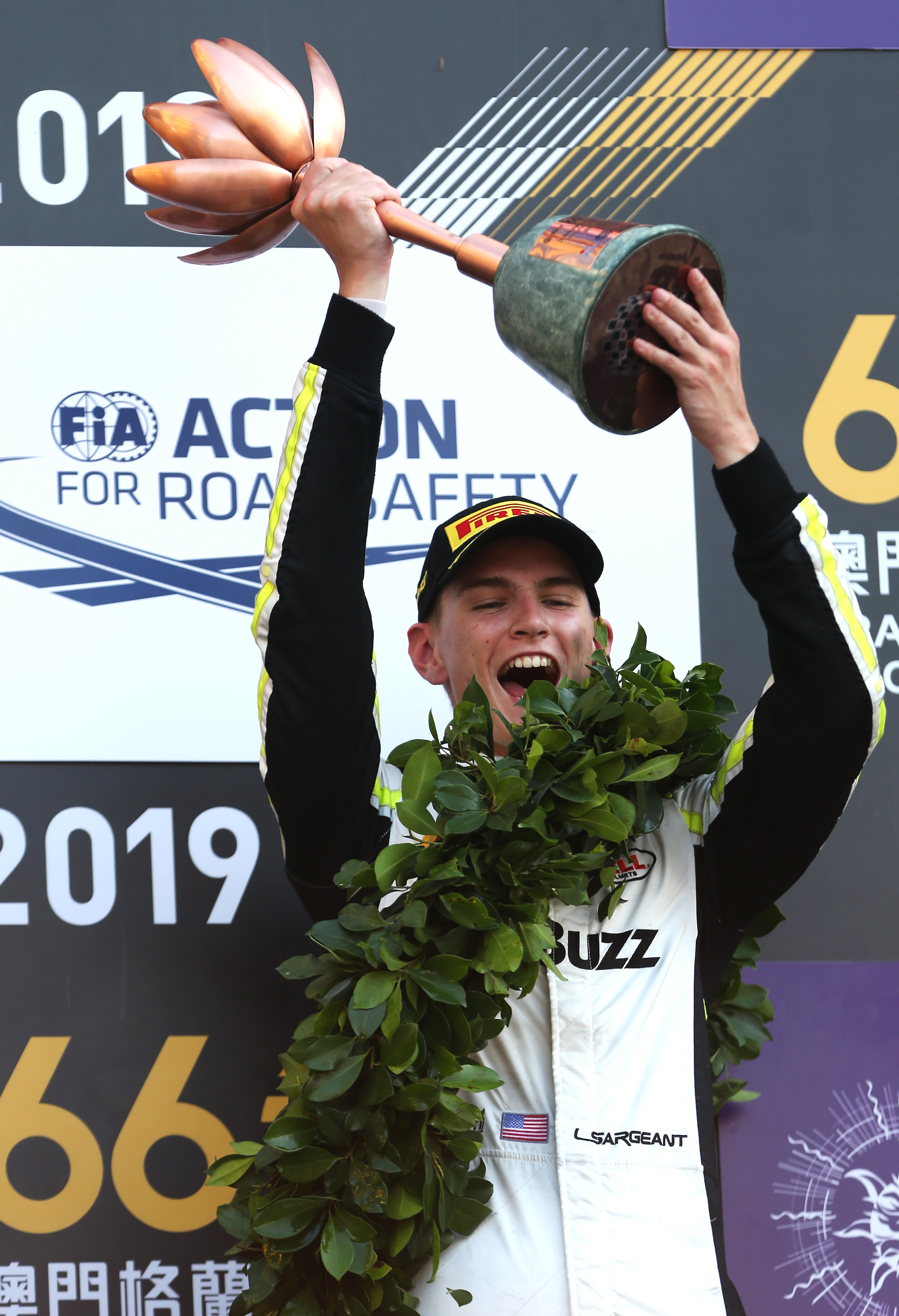
Sargeant celebrating his podium at the 2019 Macau Grand Prix

At the end of 2019, Sargeant competed in the Macau Grand Prix. He placed tenth in qualifying, ahead of teammates Drugovich and Dan Ticktum. In the qualification race, he was involved in an opening-lap crash with Arjun Maini that eliminated Maini, Jake Hughes and Enaam Ahmed from the race. Sargeant himself avoided damage and went on to finish sixth. He finished the main race on the podium in third, behind Jüri Vips and race winner Richard Verschoor.

==== 2020 ====
For the 2020 season, Sargeant switched to reigning Teams' Champions Prema Racing, partnering Frederik Vesti and former British F4 rival Oscar Piastri. He took two podium finishes at the Red Bull Ring and another podium from pole position in the first Silverstone feature race. He scored his first FIA F3 victory in the second feature race at Silverstone, again from pole position, which promoted him into the lead of the championship. He claimed a third consecutive pole at Barcelona and finished third in the feature race, retaining the championship lead after round six of nine.

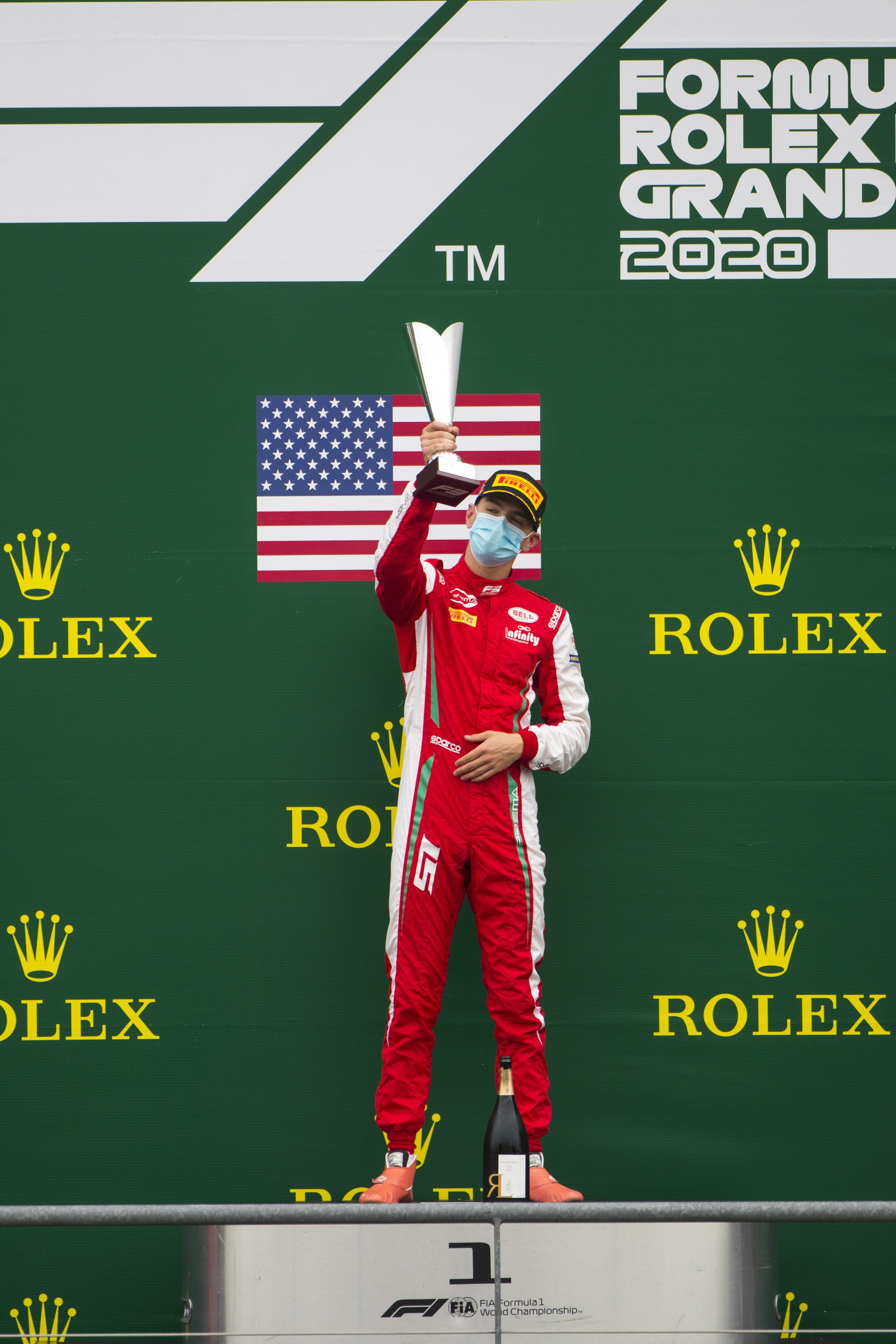
Sargeant celebrating his win in the Sprint race during the 2020 Spa-Francorchamps Formula 3 round

Sargeant's next win came in the next round at Spa-Francorchamps, where he won the sprint race and extended his points advantage over Piastri. However, collisions with Clément Novalak and teammate Vesti at Monza Circuit left him with no points in either race and a grid penalty for the final round. Sixth place in the Mugello feature race left him tied with Piastri on 160 points going into the final race, but contact with Lirim Zendeli on the opening lap eliminated him from contention as Piastri went on to claim the title. Championship outsider Théo Pourchaire finished on the podium, leaving Sargeant third in the standings, one point behind Pourchaire and four behind Piastri.

==== 2021 ====
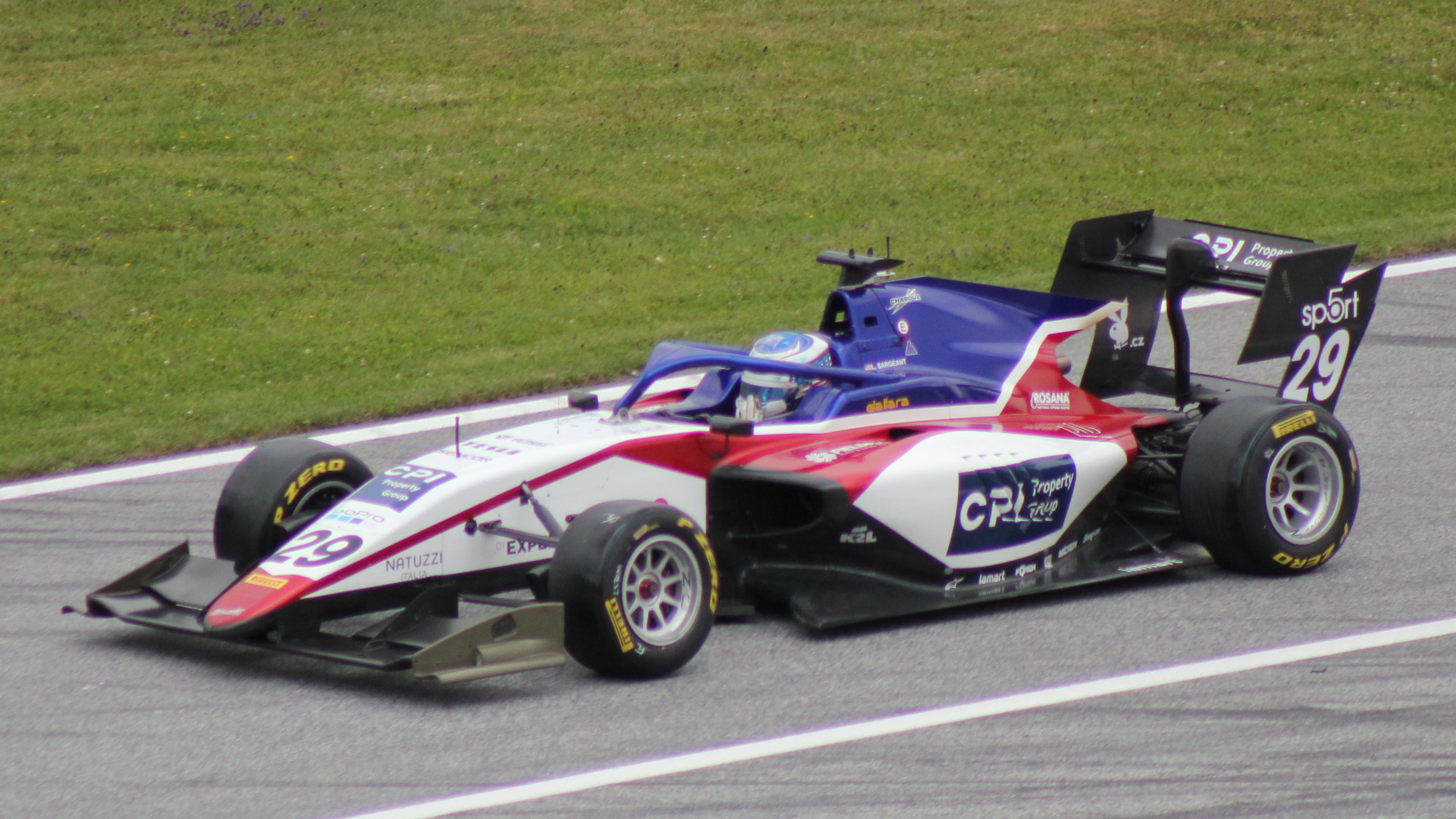
Sargeant driving the Dallara F3 2019 at the 2021 Spielberg Formula 3 round

In February 2021, Sargeant ruled out a move to the FIA Formula 2 Championship despite performing a test with Campos Racing, citing financial reasons, and stated his interest in pursuing options in sports car racing or Indy Lights. In April, he took part in a pre-season F3 test with Charouz Racing System, who had finished last in the Teams' Championship the previous year. This was followed by an announcement of his return to the championship for 2021 with Charouz shortly before the first race of the season.

Sargeant scored points in three of the first four races and finished third in the first race at the Red Bull Ring, but lost the podium position post-race due to a penalty for track limit violations. His first podium of the season, and the first ever podium in the series for Charouz, came in the first race at the Hungaroring. More podiums came at Spa-Francorchamps and at Zandvoort. He took his only win of the season at Sochi Autodrom, thus giving Charouz their first victory in Formula 3. Sargeant finished the campaign seventh in the Drivers' Championship, scoring 102 of the team's 127 points.

=== FIA Formula 2 Championship ===
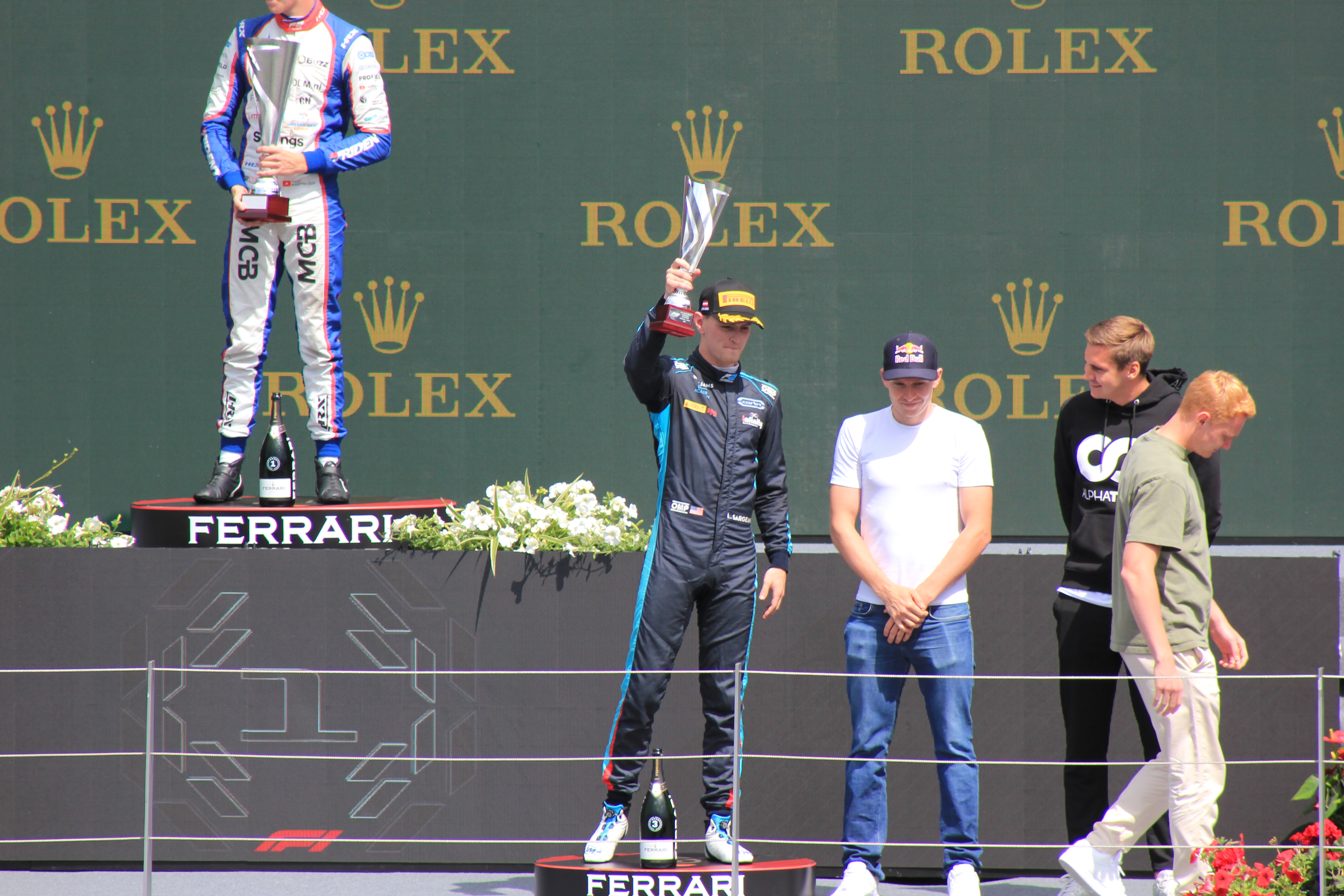
Sargeant on the podium at the 2022 Spielberg Formula 2 round

After receiving the backing of Formula One team Williams, Sargeant made his Formula 2 debut in the penultimate round of the 2021 season with HWA Racelab. He finished the first race in 16th, retired in the second sprint due to a mechanical problem, and ended the aborted feature race in 14th position.

In December 2021, it was announced that Sargeant would join Carlin, the team he had previously raced for in F4 and F3, to contest the 2022 Formula 2 Championship alongside Liam Lawson. He qualified fourth at the opening round in Bahrain and scored points in both races, but a crash in qualifying at the next round in Jeddah forced him to start 18th and he failed to score. He claimed his first podium in the Barcelona sprint race and his first feature race podium at Baku, finishing second. At Silverstone, he achieved his first pole position in the series and converted it into his first victory. At the Red Bull Ring, he qualified third and finished the feature race fourth. However, the disqualification of race winner Richard Verschoor and time penalties for Jehan Daruvala and Roberto Merhi meant that Sargeant inherited his second consecutive feature race win. This result promoted him to second place in the championship, with 115 points to teammate Lawson's 60.

That victory would ultimately be his final podium finish of the season. He achieved another pole position at the next round at Circuit Paul Ricard, but retired from the feature race after stalling in the pits. More retirements came in the sprint races at the Hungaroring and at Spa-Francorchamps, both due to accidents. Sargeant's feature races at the following two rounds, Zandvoort and Monza, both ended in first-lap crashes. At the end of the season, Sargeant was fourth in the Drivers' Championship on 148 points, one point behind Lawson. Sargeant achieved two wins, two pole positions and four total podiums over the year.

== Formula One career ==
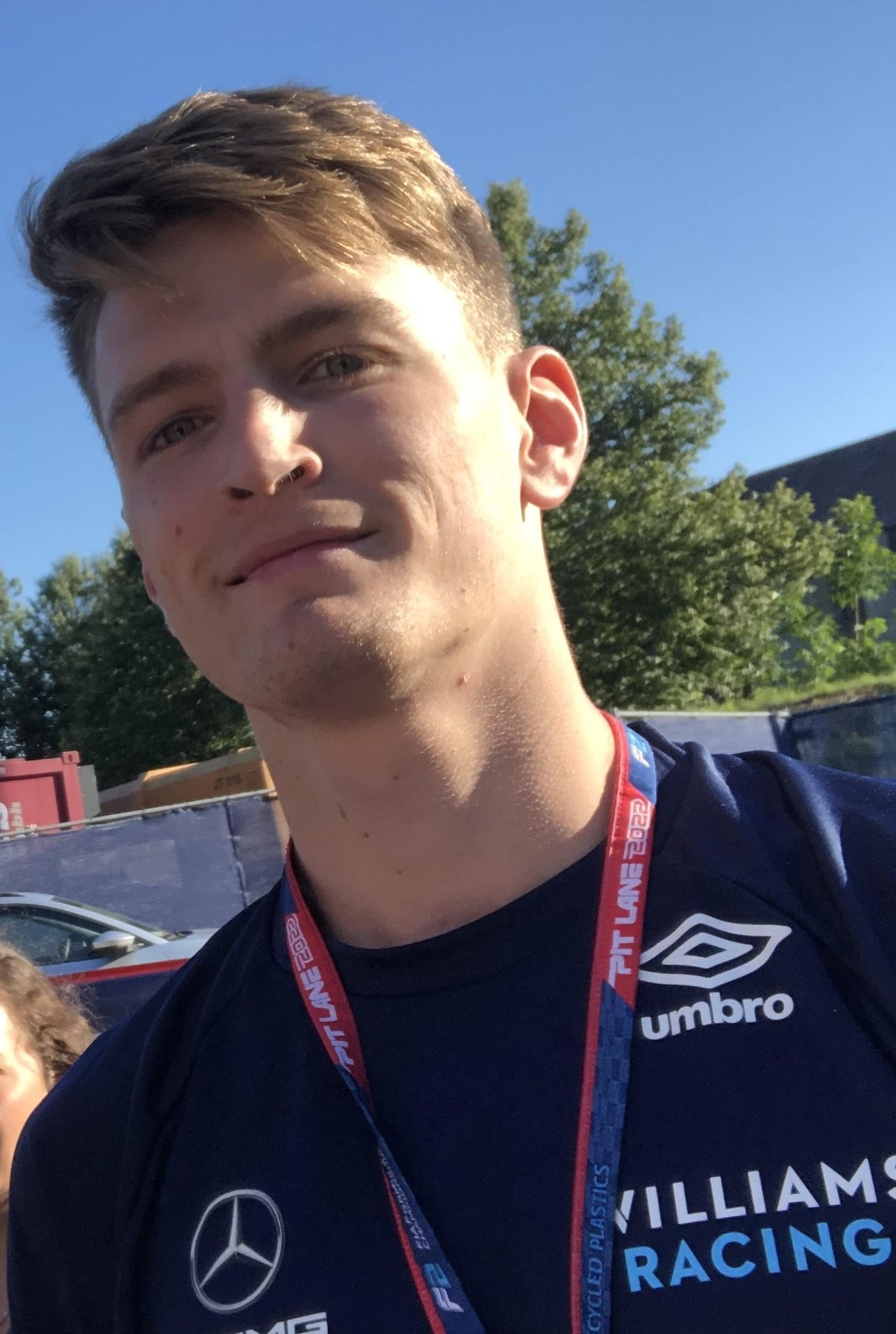
Sargeant at the 2022 Austrian Grand Prix

In October 2021, on the weekend of the United States Grand Prix, it was announced that Sargeant had joined the Williams Driver Academy. He drove a Formula One car for the first time in the Yas Marina Circuit post-season test at the wheel of the Williams FW43B, which he described as an "experience of a lifetime."

Sargeant made his Formula One practice debut with Williams at the 2022 United States Grand Prix, making him the first American driver to take part in a Grand Prix weekend session since Alexander Rossi in 2015. Williams' team principal Jost Capito stated that his debut "was a pleasure and pressure for Sargeant". Capito also confirmed that Sargeant would drive for Williams in 2023, replacing the outgoing Nicholas Latifi, provided he obtained the necessary FIA Super Licence points by finishing at least fifth (or sixth without any penalty points) in his Formula 2 campaign. Capito also commented that Sargeant's American nationality was "not the initiation for the decision" to promote him.

Sargeant drove the FW44 in further practice sessions at the Mexico City, São Paulo and Abu Dhabi Grands Prix. He achieved the required Super Licence points at the Abu Dhabi weekend and was officially announced as a 2023 Williams race driver the following day. He chose 2 as his permanent driver number, last used by Stoffel Vandoorne in 2018.

=== Williams (2023–2024) ===
==== 2023: Debut season ====
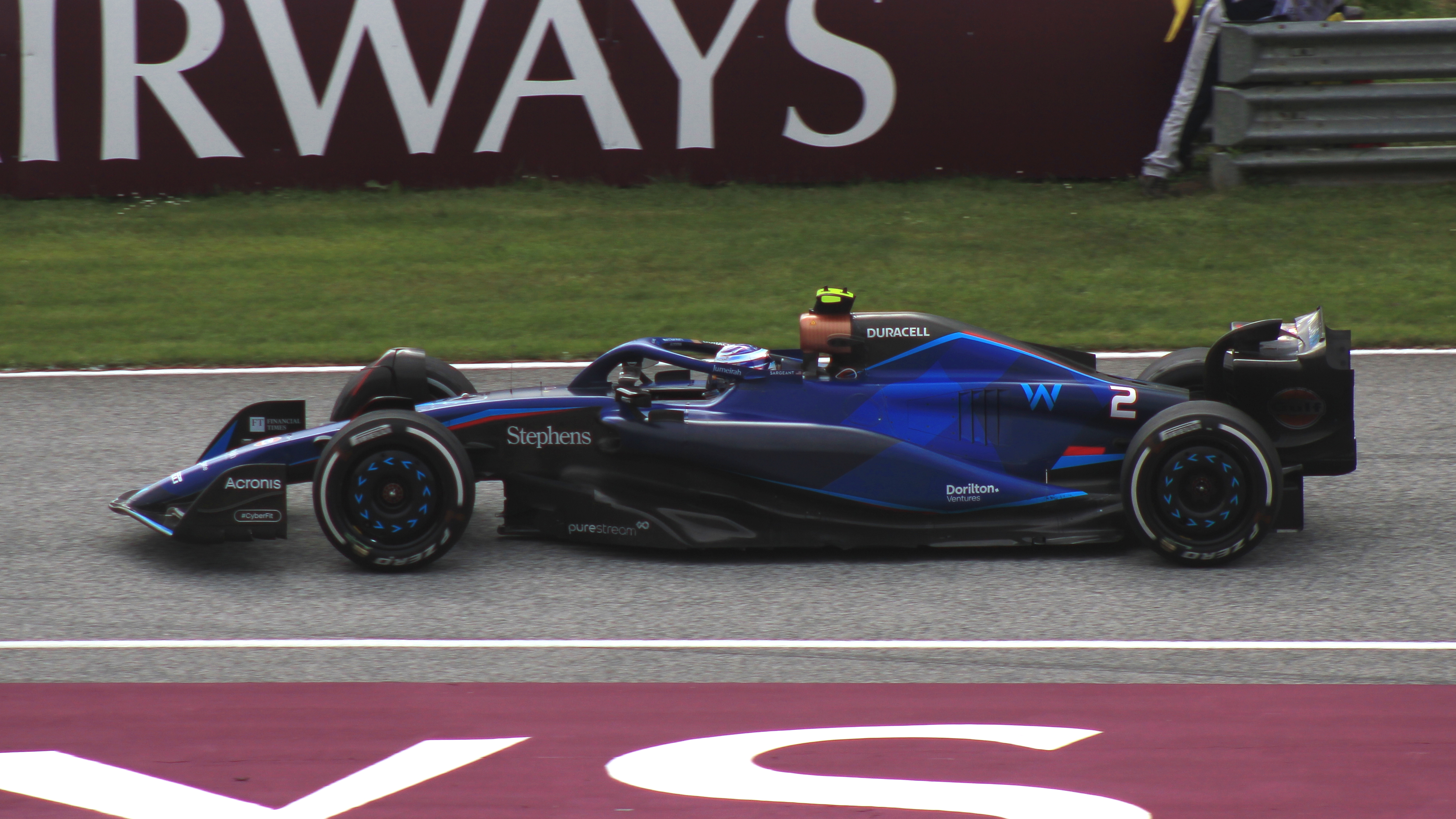
Sargeant at the 2023 Austrian Grand Prix

Sargeant qualified 16th for the season opener at Bahrain International Circuit, setting an identical lap time to McLaren's Lando Norris but missing out on advancing to the second qualifying session (Q2) as Norris set his time first. He finished the race twelfth, two places behind teammate Alex Albon. After the race, Sargeant commented that he was "very, very happy" with his debut race but was disappointed to miss out on Q2. He failed to set a meaningful lap time in qualifying at the Saudi Arabian Grand Prix. He subsequently started from last place and went on to finish 16th. He retired from the Australian Grand Prix after colliding with Nyck de Vries at the third restart and was classified 16th. He reached Q2 for the first time at the Azerbaijan Grand Prix but crashed during the sprint shootout, forcing him to withdraw from the sprint due to car damage. He qualified and finished 20th at both the Miami and Spanish Grands Prix, and then qualified 19th and retired with an oil leak at the Canadian Grand Prix.

Better results came at the Austrian Grand Prix, where he was classified 13th despite starting 18th and receiving penalties for track limits violations, and at the British Grand Prix, where he reached Q2 and finished 11th, four seconds behind the Ferrari of Carlos Sainz Jr. He then qualified last at the Hungarian Grand Prix and eventually retired after spinning out. He crashed in practice for the Belgian Grand Prix in rainy conditions and went on to finish the race 17th. He reached Q3 for the first time at the Dutch Grand Prix, but crashed in the final session. He crashed again during the race, which the team blamed on a hydraulics issue. He advanced to Q2 again at the Italian Grand Prix and finished 13th despite receiving a penalty for causing a collision with Valtteri Bottas. He avoided a grid penalty for impeding in qualifying at the Singapore Grand Prix, which the FIA later accepted was an error. Early in the race, Sargeant hit the wall and damaged his front wing. He went on to finish 14th.

Sargeant crashed heavily in qualifying at the Japanese Grand Prix and was forced to start the race from the pit lane. He received a penalty for colliding with Bottas in the early laps, with the damage ultimately causing both cars to retire from the race. He retired from the Qatar Grand Prix sprint after spinning into the gravel, and later withdrew from the race after 40 laps due to heat stroke and dehydration, symptoms experienced by other drivers due to the extreme weather conditions. He started 16th at the United States Grand Prix but improved to finish 12th. He was later promoted to tenth after the disqualifications of Lewis Hamilton and Charles Leclerc, making Sargeant the first American driver to score a point in Formula One since Michael Andretti at the 1993 Italian Grand Prix. He failed to set a qualifying time at the Mexico City Grand Prix and later retired from the race with a fuel pump issue. He then improved from 19th on the grid at the São Paulo Grand Prix to 11th at the finish. He achieved his career best qualifying performance at the Las Vegas Grand Prix, starting sixth, but both Williams drivers dropped outside the points at the finish. He again failed to set a qualifying time at the season-ending Abu Dhabi Grand Prix as his attempts were deleted for violating track limits. This meant that he was out-qualified by teammate Albon at all of the season's twenty-two races.

Sargeant finished the season 21st in the World Drivers' Championship, scoring one point to Albon's tally of 27. Sky Sports described his debut season as "hugely challenging". The Race and RaceFans both ranked him 21st of 22 drivers based on performance, although the former commented that he "showed flashes of genuine speed".

==== 2024: Curtailed second year ====
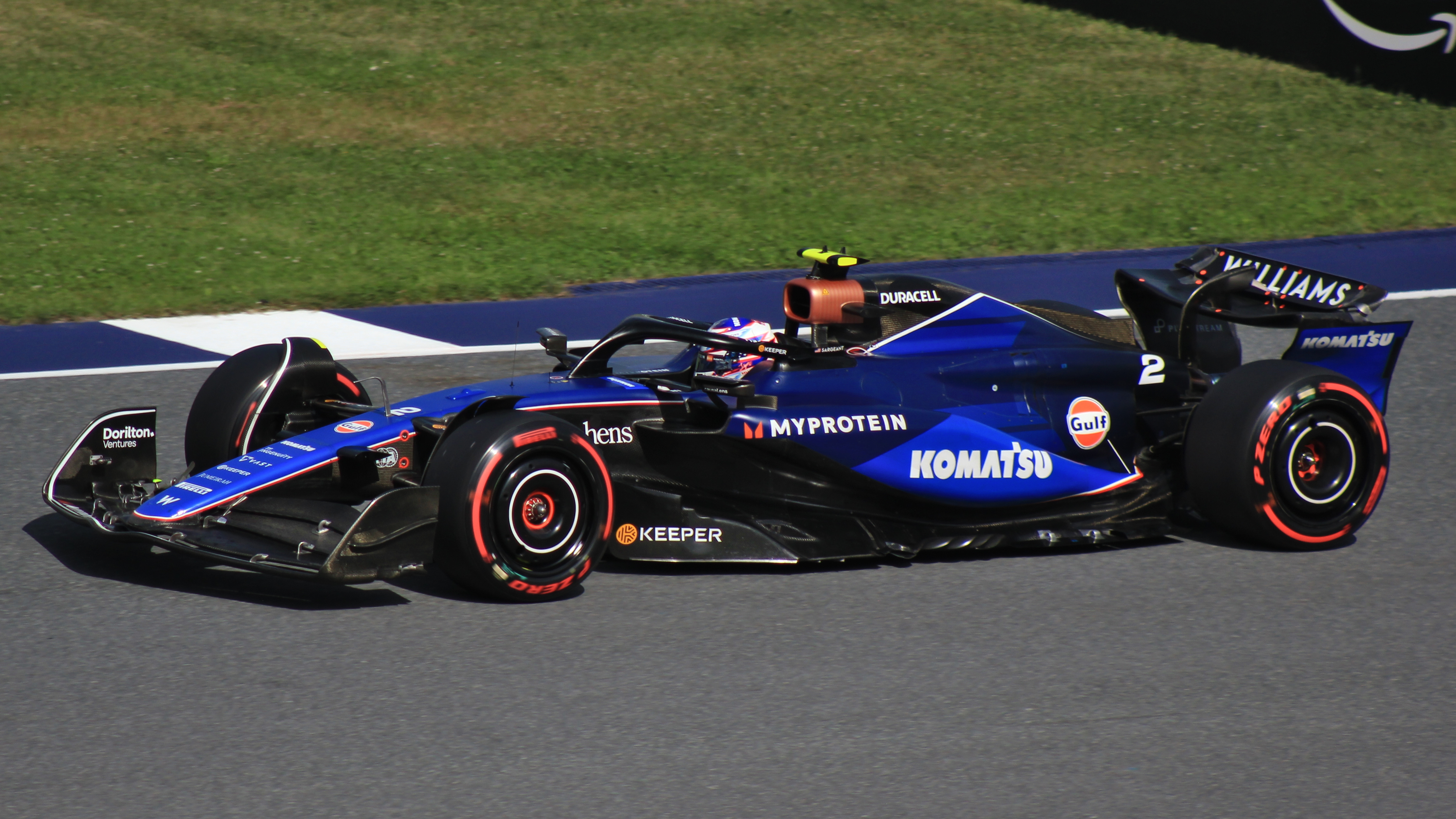
Sargeant at the 2024 Austrian Grand Prix

In December 2023, Williams announced that Sargeant had been re-signed and would drive for the team in 2024 alongside Albon. At the season opener at the Bahrain International Circuit, he qualified 18th, improved to 14th by the second lap, but finished 20th following a steering wheel issue. He then gained five places at the Saudi Arabian Grand Prix, starting 19th and finishing 14th. He withdrew from the Australian Grand Prix to allow teammate Albon to use his chassis; Albon had crashed heavily in practice, and the team were unable to repair his car. Sargeant described the situation as the "hardest moment" of his career.

Sargeant returned at the Japanese Grand Prix but crashed in practice. During the race, he ran as high as 11th place but went on to finish 17th after locking up and going into the gravel. He described the Chinese Grand Prix as a "massive struggle" after starting from the pit lane and finishing 17th with a penalty for a safety car infringement. He gained eight places to finish 10th in the sprint at the Miami Grand Prix, but was forced into retirement from the main race after a collision with Kevin Magnussen. Sargeant made his first Q2 appearance of 2024 at the Canadian Grand Prix, qualifying 13th, but retired from the race after spinning out. After finishing last of the running drivers at both the Spanish and Austrian Grands Prix, an improved showing at the British Grand Prix saw him qualify 12th and finish 11th, his best qualifying and race results of the season.

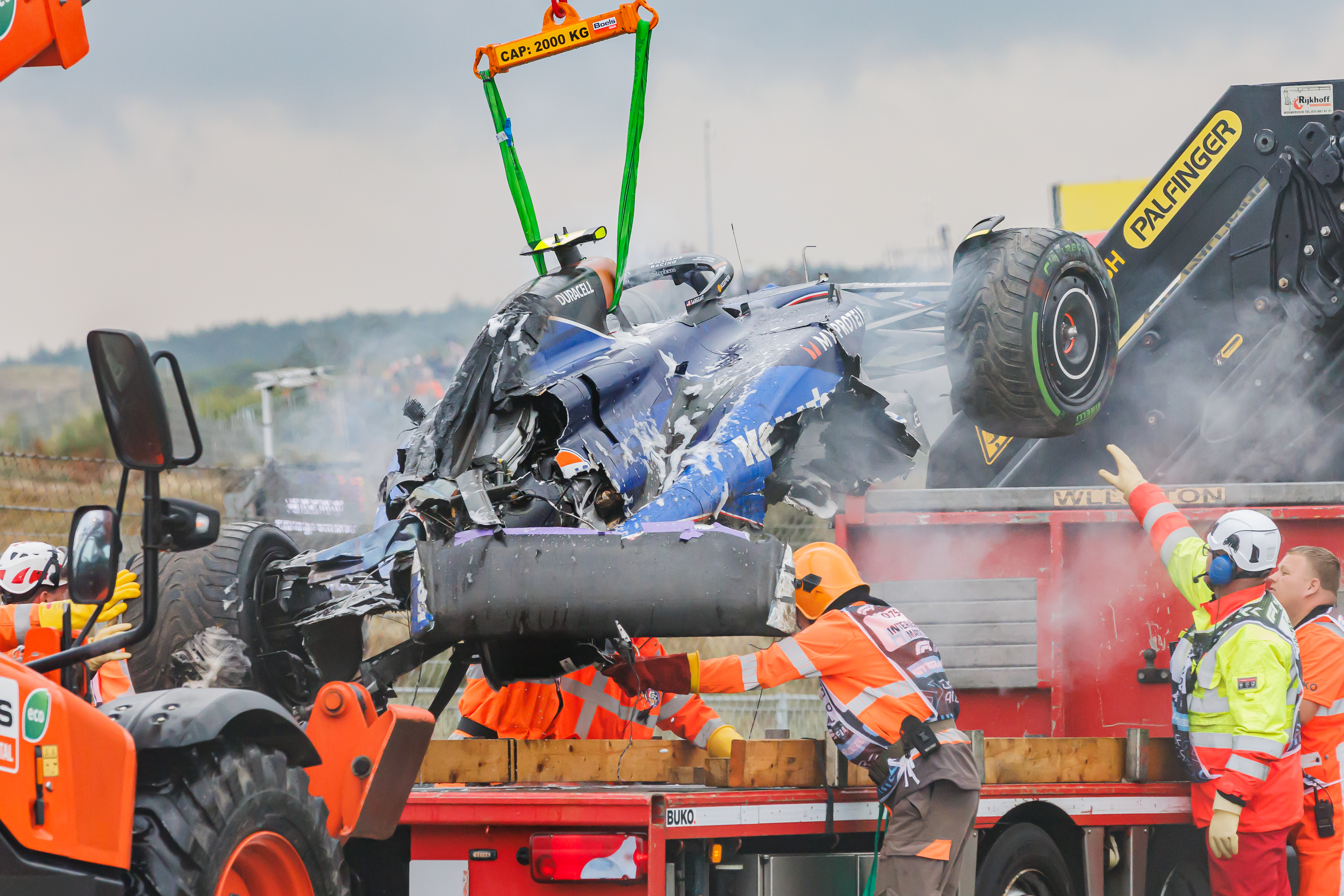
Sargeant was released from Williams after a heavy crash at the Dutch Grand Prix.

On the day after the Belgian Grand Prix, Williams announced that Sargeant would be replaced by Carlos Sainz Jr. at the team for the 2025 season. Amid speculation that Sargeant's position at Williams was at imminent risk, Williams team principal James Vowles commented that the team was "continually evaluating it" and that the sport was a "meritocracy", whilst Sargeant remarked that he would "fight no matter what the situation is". Formula One returned from its summer break at the Dutch Grand Prix, at which Sargeant crashed heavily in practice, forcing him to miss qualifying as the car could not be repaired in time. He would finish the race in 16th place. Two days after the race, Sargeant was released from the team with immediate effect and was replaced by Formula 2 driver Franco Colapinto for the remainder of the 2024 season. Vowles stated that the decision "gives Williams the best chance to compete for points" over the remaining nine races, and later commented that keeping Sargeant for the second half would be "almost unfair."

== Other racing ==
=== IndyCar ===
In October 2024, Sargeant had his first IndyCar test, driving the Dallara DW12 at Thermal Club with Meyer Shank Racing.

== Sports car racing career ==
=== 2021 ===
Sargeant raced for Iron Lynx in the GT3 class for two rounds of the 2021 Le Mans Cup, where he claimed two pole positions and two victories. Sargeant drove for Racing Team Turkey in two races of the 2021 European Le Mans Series, claiming pole position in his LMP2 debut.

=== 2025 ===
In December 2024, Sargeant tested an Oreca 07 for IDEC Sport, and was later announced to have signed with the team and Genesis Magma Racing for the 2025 European Le Mans Series alongside Jamie Chadwick and Mathys Jaubert. Prior to the season, he withdrew from his seat. In an interview on August 14, 2025, Sargeant stated; "coming off of that [Formula One] — obviously it was a hectic, intense, emotionally challenging, physically demanding — my mind just felt like it needed a little break, I feel like a lot of people may struggle to understand that until you’re in that position, but I just needed to let the whole experience sink in, let my body naturally recover and start to reassess what it wanted to do. And, naturally, it was racing in the end" following his Formula One stint with Williams. He explained further that he "was extremely grateful for that opportunity with IDEC, and the test I did with the team in December last year went really well, but things were a bit rushed, and people around me didn’t understand the position I was in. I didn’t sign any contracts; I didn’t want to lock myself into anything, as I was still unsure at that point where I wanted to be. I needed more time.”

=== IMSA SportsCar Championship ===
On August 14, 2025, Sargeant announced his return to sports car racing with PR1/Mathiasen Motorsports, to compete in the LMP2 class in the final two rounds of the 2025 IMSA SportsCar Championship. The team finished in 8th at the 2025 IMSA Battle on the Bricks and 4th at the 2025 Petit Le Mans season finale.

==== 2026 ====
In January 2026, it was confirmed that Sargeant would compete in the 2026 24 Hours of Daytona for Era Motorsport in the LMP2 class alongside Jacob Abel, Ferdinand Habsburg, and Naveen Rao.

=== FIA World Endurance Championship ===
The No. 88 Proton Competition Ford Mustang GT3 Evo belonging to Sargeant, Gattuso, and Levorato during the 2026 6 Hours of Spa-Francorchamps.

On January 15, 2026, Sargeant was confirmed as one of three drivers for Ford Racing’s factory LMDh sports prototype programme for the 2027 FIA World Endurance Championship, alongside Sebastian Priaulx and Mike Rockenfeller. Working with Ford, Sargeant has said that he was heavily involved in the development work for the 2027 car. At the same time, it was announced that he would compete in the 2026 FIA World Endurance Championship for Proton Competition in the Ford Mustang GT3 Evo alongside Stefano Gattuso and Giammarco Levorato. Sargeant had a solid debut in the championship at Imola, finishing inside the points in eighth. In qualifying at Spa-Francorchamps, Levorato qualified the car fifth for the race. During the race, Gattuso moved into the lead before handing the car off to Levorato. Mid-way through his stint, Levorato received two drive-through penalties for track limits. This derailed their race, and Sargeant brought the car to the finish in twelfth.

== Karting record ==
=== Karting career summary ===
Season	Series	Team	Position
2008	Florida Winter Tour — Rotax Micro Max	RDD Motorsports	3rd
2008	Rotax Max Challenge USA — Micro Max	RDD Motorsports	3rd
2009	Florida Winter Tour — Rotax Micro Max	RDD Motorsports	1st
2009	Rotax Max Challenge USA — Micro Max	RDD Motorsports	1st
2010	Florida Winter Tour — Rotax Mini Max		9th
2010	SKUSA Pro Tour — TaG Cadet		21st
2010	Pan American Rotax Max Challenge — Micro Max		NC
2010	SKUSA SuperNationals — TaG Cadet		37th
2011	SKUSA Pro Tour — TaG Cadet		10th
2011	South Florida RMAX Challenge — Rotax Mini Max	RDD Motorsports	1st
2011	ROK Cup International Final — Mini ROK		1st
2011	SKUSA SuperNationals — TaG Cadet		1st
2012	Florida Winter Tour — Rotax Mini Max		3rd
2012	Florida Winter Tour — TaG Cadet		2nd
2012	Silver Cup— 60 Mini		2nd
2012	Andrea Margutti Trophy — 60 Junior		1st
2012	WSK Master Series — 60 Mini	Ward Racing	9th
2012	WSK Euro Series — 60 Mini	Ward Racing	3rd
2012	Italian CSAI Championship — 60 Mini	Ward Racing	4th
2012	WSK Final Cup — 60 Mini	Ward Racing	9th
2012	Trofeo delle Industrie — 60 Mini	Ward Racing	1st
2012	SKUSA SuperNationals — TaG Junior	Sargeant Motorsports	11th
2013	South Garda Winter Cup — KF3		14th
2013	Andrea Margutti Trophy — KF3		31st
2013	WSK Euro Series — KFJ	Ward Racing	14th
2013	WSK Super Master Series — KFJ	Ward Racing	14th
2013	CIK-FIA European Championship — KFJ	Ward Racing	14th
2013	CIK-FIA World Championship — KFJ	Ward Racing	37th
2013	Italian CSAI Championship — KF3		15th
2013	WSK Final Cup — KFJ	Ricky Flynn Motorsport	15th
2013	SKUSA SuperNationals — TaG Junior	Sargeant Motorsports	2nd
2014	South Garda Winter Cup — KFJ	Ricky Flynn Motorsport	NC
2014	WSK Champions Cup — KFJ	Ricky Flynn Motorsport	45th
2014	Andrea Margutti Trophy — KFJ	Ricky Flynn Motorsport	7th
2014	WSK Super Master Series — KFJ	Ricky Flynn Motorsport	9th
2014	German Karting Championship — Junior	Ricky Flynn Motorsport	12th
2014	CIK-FIA European Championship — KFJ	Ricky Flynn Motorsport	6th
2014	CIK-FIA World Championship — KFJ	Ricky Flynn Motorsport	53rd
2014	Trofeo delle Industrie — KFJ	Ricky Flynn Motorsport	33rd
2014	WSK Final Cup — KFJ	Ricky Flynn Motorsport	2nd
2014	SKUSA SuperNationals — TaG Junior	Sargeant Motorsports	1st
2015	WSK Champions Cup — KFJ	Ricky Flynn Motorsport	1st
2015	South Garda Winter Cup — KFJ	Ricky Flynn Motorsport	2nd
2015	WSK Gold Cup — KFJ	Ricky Flynn Motorsport	3rd
2015	WSK Super Master Series — KFJ	Ricky Flynn Motorsport	2nd
2015	CIK-FIA European Championship — KFJ	Ricky Flynn Motorsport	29th
2015	WSK Night Edition — KFJ	Ricky Flynn Motorsport	1st
2015	CIK-FIA World Championship — KFJ	Ricky Flynn Motorsport	1st
2015	WSK Final Cup — KF	Ricky Flynn Motorsport	5th
2015	SKUSA SuperNationals — TaG Senior	Sargeant Motorsports	4th
2016	WSK Champions Cup — OK	Ricky Flynn Motorsport	1st
2016	South Garda Winter Cup — OK	Ricky Flynn Motorsport	29th
2016	WSK Super Master Series — OK	Ricky Flynn Motorsport	4th
2016	CIK-FIA European Championship — OK	Ricky Flynn Motorsport	5th

== Racing record ==
=== Racing career summary ===
Season	Series	Team	Races	Wins	Poles	F/Laps	Podiums	Points	Position
2016	Formula 4 UAE Championship – Trophy Event	Team Motopark	3	0	0	2	3	—N/a	NC
2016–17	Formula 4 UAE Championship	Team Motopark	18	0	0	7	15	261	**2nd**
2017	F4 British Championship	Carlin	30	2	2	2	10	356	**3rd**
2017	Formula Renault Eurocup	R-ace GP	3	0	0	0	0	—N/a	NC†
2017	Formula Renault NEC	R-ace GP	2	0	0	0	0	24	23rd
2017	V de V Challenge Monoplace	R-ace GP	3	1	1	0	3	99	28th
2018	Formula Renault Eurocup	R-ace GP	20	3	2	3	7	218	4th
2018	Formula Renault NEC	R-ace GP	12	1	0	2	3	87	5th
2019	FIA Formula 3 Championship	Carlin Buzz Racing	16	0	0	0	0	5	19th
2019	Macau Grand Prix	Carlin Buzz Racing	1	0	0	0	1	—N/a	**3rd**
2020	FIA Formula 3 Championship	Prema Racing	18	2	3	2	6	160	**3rd**
2021	FIA Formula 3 Championship	Charouz Racing System	20	1	0	0	4	102	7th
2021	European Le Mans Series – LMP2	Racing Team Turkey	2	0	1	0	0	21	19th
2021	Le Mans Cup – GT3	Iron Lynx	3	2	2	3	3	51	6th
2021	FIA Formula 2 Championship	HWA Racelab	3	0	0	0	0	0	29th
2022	FIA Formula 2 Championship	Carlin	28	2	2	0	4	148	4th
2023	Formula One	Williams Racing	22	0	0	0	0	1	21st
2024	Formula One	Williams Racing	15	0	0	0	0	0	23rd
2025	IMSA SportsCar Championship – LMP2	PR1/Mathiasen Motorsports	2	0	0	0	0	555	37th
2026	FIA World Endurance Championship – LMGT3	Proton Competition	8	0	0	0	0	16	21st
2026	24 Hours of Le Mans – LMGT3	Proton Competition	1	0	0	0	0	N/A	17th
2026	IMSA SportsCar Championship – LMP2	Era Motorsport	1	0	0	0	0	244	40th
2027	FIA World Endurance Championship – Hypercar	Ford Racing	0	0	0	0	0	0	TBD

^{†} As Sargeant was a guest driver, he was ineligible for points.

=== Complete Formula 4 UAE Championship results ===
(key) (Races in bold indicate pole position; races in italics indicate fastest lap)

Year	Team	1	2	3	4	5	6	7	8	9	10	11	12	13	14	15	16	17	18	DC	Points
2016–17	Team Motopark	DUB1; 1; 2	DUB1; 2; 2	DUB1; 3; 2	YMC1; 1; 2	YMC1; 2; 2	YMC1; 3; 2	YMC1; 4; 2	DUB2; 1; 3	DUB2; 2 Ret	DUB2; 3; 2	YMC2; 1; 2	YMC2; 2; 3	YMC2; 3; 2	YMC2; 4; 3	YMC3; 1; 2	YMC3; 2 Ret	YMC3; 3; 2	YMC3; 4 Ret	2nd	261

=== Complete F4 British Championship results ===
(key) (Races in bold indicate pole position) (Races in italics indicate fastest lap)

Year	Team	1	2	3	4	5	6	7	8	9	10	11	12	13	14	15	16	17	18	19	20	21	22	23	24	25	26	27	28	29	30	31	Pos	Points
2017	Carlin	BRI; 1; 4	BRI; 2; 4	BRI; 3; 6	DON; 1; 10	DON; 2; 13	DON; 3; 4	THR; 1; 6	THR; 2; 4	THR; 3; 2	OUL; 1; 5	OUL; 2; 2	OUL; 3 C	CRO; 1; 3	CRO; 2; 3	CRO; 3; 6	SNE; 1; 4	SNE; 2; 4	SNE; 3; 2	KNO; 1; 5	KNO; 2; 2	KNO; 3; 2	KNO; 4; 4	ROC; 1; 4	ROC; 2; 4	**ROC**; **3**; 1	SIL; 1; 7	SIL; 2; 1	SIL; 3; 4	**BHGP**; **1**; 2	BHGP; 2; 4	BHGP; 3 Ret	3rd	356

=== Complete Formula Renault Eurocup results ===
(key) (Races in bold indicate pole position) (Races in italics indicate fastest lap)

Year	Team	1	2	3	4	5	6	7	8	9	10	11	12	13	14	15	16	17	18	19	20	21	22	23	Pos	Points
2017	R-ace GP	MNZ; 1	MNZ; 2	SIL; 1	SIL; 2	PAU; 1	PAU; 2	MON; 1	MON; 2	HUN; 1	HUN; 2	HUN; 3	NÜR; 1	NÜR; 2	RBR; 1	RBR; 2	LEC; 1	LEC; 2	SPA; 1	SPA; 2	SPA; 3	CAT; 1; 8	CAT; 2; 9	CAT; 3 Ret	NC†	0
2018	R-ace GP	LEC; 1; 1	LEC; 2 Ret	MNZ; 1; 8	MNZ; 2; 4	SIL; 1; 2	SIL; 2; 2	MON; 1; 10	MON; 2; 9	RBR; 1 Ret	RBR; 2 Ret	SPA; 1; 9	**SPA**; **2**; 2	HUN; 1; 5	HUN; 2; 7	**NÜR**; **1**; 1	NÜR; 2; 4	HOC; 1; 4	HOC; 2; 5	CAT; 1; 2	CAT; 2; 1				4th	218

^{†} As Sargeant was a guest driver, he was ineligible for points.

=== Complete Formula Renault Northern European Cup results ===
(key) (Races in bold indicate pole position) (Races in italics indicate fastest lap)

Year	Team	1	2	3	4	5	6	7	8	9	10	11	12	Pos	Points
2017	R-ace GP	MNZ; 1	MNZ; 2	ASS; 1	ASS; 2	NÜR; 1	NÜR; 2	SPA; 1	SPA; 2	SPA; 3	HOC; 1; 4	HOC; 2; 14		23rd	24
2018	R-ace GP	PAU; 1; 3	PAU; 2; 3	MNZ; 1; 1	MNZ; 2; 4	SPA; 1; 9	SPA; 2; 2	HUN; 1; 5	HUN; 2; 7	NÜR; 1; 1	NÜR; 2; 4	HOC; 1; 4	HOC; 2; 5	5th	87

=== Complete FIA Formula 3 Championship results ===
(key) (Races in bold indicate pole position; races in italics indicate points for the fastest lap of top ten finishers)

Year	Entrant	1	2	3	4	5	6	7	8	9	10	11	12	13	14	15	16	17	18	19	20	21	DC	Points
2019	Carlin Buzz Racing	CAT; FEA; 15	CAT; SPR; 14	LEC; FEA; 12	LEC; SPR; 8	RBR; FEA; 22	RBR; SPR; 26	SIL; FEA; 26	SIL; SPR; 13	HUN; FEA; 10	HUN; SPR; 8	SPA; FEA; 13	SPA; SPR; Ret	MNZ; FEA; 9	MNZ; SPR; 10	SOC; FEA; 15	SOC; SPR; 10						19th	5
2020	Prema Racing	RBR; FEA; 2	RBR; SPR; 27	RBR; FEA; 6‡	RBR; SPR; 2	HUN; FEA; 6	HUN; SPR; 4	**SIL**; **FEA**; 3	SIL; SPR; 5	**SIL**; **FEA**; 1	SIL; SPR; Ret	**CAT**; **FEA**; 3	CAT; SPR; 5	SPA; FEA; 8	SPA; SPR; 1	MNZ; FEA; 26	MNZ; SPR; 24†	MUG; FEA; 6	MUG; SPR; Ret				3rd	160
2021	Charouz Racing System	CAT; 1; 4	CAT; 2 Ret	CAT; 3; 9	LEC; 1; 4	LEC; 2; 12	LEC; 3 Ret	RBR; 1; 15	RBR; 2 Ret	RBR; 3; 8	HUN; 1; 3	HUN; 2; 9	HUN; 3; 10	SPA; 1; 8	SPA; 2; 3	SPA; 3; 7	ZAN; 1; 2	ZAN; 2; 10	ZAN; 3; 6	SOC; 1; 1	SOC; 2 C	SOC; 3; 4	7th	102

^{†} Driver did not finish the race, but were classified, as they completed more than 90% of the race distance.
^{‡} Half points awarded as less than 75% of race distance was completed.

=== Complete Macau Grand Prix results ===
Year	Team	Car	Qualifying	Quali Race	Main race
2019	(United Kingdom) Carlin Buzz Racing	Dallara F3 2019	10th	6th	**3rd**

=== Complete European Le Mans Series results ===
(key) (Races in bold indicate pole position; results in italics indicate fastest lap)

Year	Entrant	Class	Chassis	Engine	1	2	3	4	5	6	Rank	Points
2021	Racing Team Turkey	LMP2	Oreca 07	Gibson GK428 4.2 L V8	CAT	**RBR**; 4	LEC	MNZ; 7	SPA	ALG	19th	21

=== Complete FIA Formula 2 Championship results ===
(key) (Races in bold indicate pole position) (Races in italics indicate points for the fastest lap of top ten finishers)

Year	Entrant	1	2	3	4	5	6	7	8	9	10	11	12	13	14	15	16	17	18	19	20	21	22	23	24	25	26	27	28	DC	Points
2021	HWA Racelab	BHR; SP1	BHR; SP2	BHR; FEA	MCO; SP1	MCO; SP2	MCO; FEA	BAK; SP1	BAK; SP2	BAK; FEA	SIL; SP1	SIL; SP2	SIL; FEA	MNZ; SP1	MNZ; SP2	MNZ; FEA	SOC; SP1	SOC; SP2	SOC; FEA	JED; SP1; 16	JED; SP2; Ret	JED; FEA; 14	YMC; SP1	YMC; SP2	YMC; FEA					29th	0
2022	Carlin	BHR; SPR; 6	BHR; FEA; 7	JED; SPR; Ret	JED; FEA; 12	IMO; SPR; 6	IMO; FEA; 7	CAT; SPR; 3	CAT; FEA; 4	MCO; SPR; 10	MCO; FEA; 9	BAK; SPR; 6	BAK; FEA; 2	SIL; SPR; 7	**SIL**; **FEA**; 1	RBR; SPR; 7	RBR; FEA; 1	LEC; SPR; 8	**LEC**; **FEA**; Ret	HUN; SPR; Ret	HUN; FEA; 10	SPA; SPR; Ret	SPA; FEA; 5	ZAN; SPR; 8	ZAN; FEA; Ret	MNZ; SPR; 4	MNZ; FEA; Ret	YMC; SPR; 6	YMC; FEA; 5	4th	148

=== Complete Formula One results ===
(key) (Races in bold indicate pole position) (Races in italics indicate fastest lap)

Year	Entrant	Chassis	Engine	1	2	3	4	5	6	7	8	9	10	11	12	13	14	15	16	17	18	19	20	21	22	23	24	WDC	Points
2022	Williams Racing	Williams FW44	Mercedes-AMG F1 M13 V6 t	BHR	SAU	AUS	EMI	MIA	ESP	MON	AZE	CAN	GBR	AUT	FRA	HUN	BEL	NED	ITA	SIN	JPN	USA; TD	MXC; TD	SAP; TD	ABU; TD			–	–
2023	Williams Racing	Williams FW45	Mercedes-AMG F1 M14 V6 t	BHR; 12	SAU; 16	AUS; 16†	AZE; 16	MIA; 20	MON; 18	ESP; 20	CAN; Ret	AUT; 13	GBR; 11	HUN; 18†	BEL; 17	NED; Ret	ITA; 13	SIN; 14	JPN; Ret	QAT; Ret	USA; 10	MXC; 16†	SAP; 11	LVG; 16	ABU; 16			21st	1
2024	Williams Racing	Williams FW46	Mercedes-AMG F1 M15 V6 t	BHR; 20	SAU; 14	AUS; WD	JPN; 17	CHN; 17	MIA; Ret	EMI; 17	MON; 15	CAN; Ret	ESP; 20	AUT; 19	GBR; 11	HUN; 17	BEL; 17	NED; 16	ITA	AZE	SIN	USA	MXC	SAP	LVG	QAT	ABU	23rd	0

^{†} Did not finish, but was classified as he had completed more than 90% of the race distance.

=== Complete IMSA SportsCar Championship results ===
(key) (Races in bold indicate pole position; results in italics indicate fastest lap)

Year	Team	No.	Class	Make	Engine	1	2	3	4	5	6	7	Rank	Points
2025	PR1/Mathiasen Motorsports	52	LMP2	Oreca 07	Gibson GK428 4.2 L V8	DAY	SEB	WGL	MOS	ELK	IMS; 8	PET; 4	37th	555
2026	Era Motorsport	18	LMP2	Oreca 07	Gibson GK428 4.2 L V8	DAY; 9	SEB	WGL	MOS	ELK	IMS	PET	40th	244

=== Complete FIA World Endurance Championship results ===
(key) (Races in bold indicate pole position; results in italics indicate fastest lap)

Year	Entrant	Class	Chassis	Engine	1	2	3	4	5	6	7	8	Rank	Points
2026	Proton Competition	LMGT3	Ford Mustang GT3 Evo	Ford Coyote 5.4 L V8	IMO; 8	SPA; 12	LMS; 11	SÃO; 5	COA; 9	FUJ; Ret	CAT; DSQ	MNZ; Ret	21st	16

=== Complete 24 Hours of Le Mans results ===
Year	Team	Co-drivers	Car	Class	Laps	Pos.	Class pos.
2026	(Germany) Proton Competition	(Italy) Stefano Gattuso (Italy) Giammarco Levorato	Ford Mustang GT3 Evo	LMGT3	323	49th	17th
