= Harry Sargeant III =

American businessman

- Sargeant in August 2007
- Born: December 30, 1957 (age 68)
- Citizenship: United States
- Education: Florida State University (BS, 1979)
- Occupation: Businessman
- Political party: Republican
- Relatives: Dalton Sargeant (nephew); Logan Sargeant (nephew)
- Awards: The Florida State University College of Business Hall of Fame

Harry Sargeant III (born December 30, 1957) is an American energy and shipping magnate from Florida. A former officer and fighter pilot in the United States Marine Corps, Sargeant operates an expansive, multibillion-dollar conglomerate of private global enterprises consisting of aviation companies, oil refineries, oil trading operations, alternative fuels development, and oil and asphalt shipping, his father's company, Sargeant Trading, being the largest fleet of asphalt tankers and barges in the world. He is also the owner of International Oil Trading Company (IOTC), a company that supplies aviation fuel to the U.S. Military in Iraq, and grosses billions of dollars annually.

== Education and military service ==
Graduating from Florida State University in 1979 with a Bachelor of Science in business, Sargeant entered the Marine Corps attending Basic School after commissioning as a Second Lieutenant, followed by Naval flight school, where he earned his pilot wings in 1981 from Kingsville, Texas. Sargeant then joined the Black Sheep, Marine Attack Squadron 214 (VMA-214). As a fighter pilot, Sargeant's mission in the A-4M Skyhawk was to provide offensive air support, armed reconnaissance, and air-defense for Marine expeditionary forces, and he continued to serve in the Marine Corps Reserves as a pilot, graduating from Navy Fighter Weapons School (Top Gun), and attaining the rank of Major before becoming inactive after 11 years of continual active duty and reserve service.

== Early shipping years and Sargeant Marine ==
Upon leaving Marine Corps active duty in 1987, Sargeant joined Delta Air Lines as a line pilot, however soon left Delta to take the helm at Sargeant Marine Inc. a small shipping company his father, Harry Sargeant Jr., himself a retired Naval Officer, had founded in 1983. Initially Sargeant focused on the transportation of asphalt products through chartered vessels. In 1989 Sargeant introduced innovations into the international market, such as ISO bitumen containers, that would enable the shipment of his asphalt products to remote destinations worldwide.

In 1992 Sargeant began acquiring asphalt tankers in earnest, and within four years he had grown the young company to a fleet of six asphalt tankers, one ocean tug, three ocean barges and several hundred bulk containers. He also purchased and converted the vessel Asphalt Commander, which at the time was the largest asphalt tanker in the world at 35,000 dead-weight tons. Sargeant continued acquisition of large tankers throughout the remainder of the 1990s and into the next millennium, accumulating a dozen ships by the time of the Iraq War. In a tip of the hat to his alma mater FSU, Sargeant would go on to name one large tanker, a 108.5 meter ship, the Asphalt Seminole.

== Business expansion and IOTC ==
=== IOTC contracts and Iraq War troop surge ===
A major military defense contractor, in 2004 Sargeant's International Oil Trading Company (IOTC), a start-up under his guide, won an initial Pentagon contract to supply petroleum to U.S. troops and coalition forces in Iraq after the original contractor failed to perform. Over the course of the next five years IOTC quickly grew to accumulate more than $2.66 billion awards from the Pentagon to deliver fuel to troops in Iraq. Because of the increasing number of ambushes on fuel convoys running the southern corridor from Kuwait to Baghdad, the Department of Defense required that all fuel and oil supplies bound for northern bases had to transit Jordan and enter Iraq through Al Anbar Province, Ramadi, and on to Baghdad. Through diplomatic skill, a critical letter of authorization was obtained by Sargeant from Jordanian authorities allowing IOTC to transit the country. Subsequent DoD contracts escalated in value year over year as demand for oil and fuels increased for Central Command forces, particularly during the months of the surge of U.S. Forces into Iraq.

A Pentagon audit has found that the federal government overpaid Harry Sargeant III by as much as $204 million on several military contracts worth nearly $2.7 billion. The audit by the Defense Department's inspector general estimated that the department paid the oilman "$160 [million] to $204 million more for fuel than could be supported by price or cost analysis." The study also reported that the three contracts were awarded under conditions that effectively eliminated the other bidders. Rep. Henry A. Waxman (D-Calif.), who led the probe, asserted in a letter to Defense Secretary Robert M. Gates that Sargeant had won the three jet fuel contracts, despite having among the highest bids, because he had an effective monopoly over the routes. Waxman accused Sargeant and his company of price gouging and "engaging in the worst form of war profiteering."

== Political activities ==
A longtime major Republican fundraiser and active behind the scenes in Florida politics since the mid-1990s, Sargeant has had a long-standing close relationship with former governor of Florida Charlie Crist, both being Pi Kappa Alpha (πΚΑ), fraternity brothers in the 1970s at Florida State University. Following Crist's gubernatorial victory, Crist tapped Sargeant as the state Republican Party's Finance Chairman, a non-paying post he held until early 2009. He resigned the post shortly before a Sargeant Marine employee, sales coordinator Ala'a al-Ali, was indicted for illegal donations to the campaigns of Charlie Crist and John McCain.

In the 2008 presidential race Sargeant donated to onetime Republican front-runner Rudy Giuliani, Mitt Romney, and eventual Republican nominee Senator John McCain. Crist had been considered as a possible McCain running mate in 2008 before running as an Independent candidate for the United States Senate from Florida in 2010.

Sargeant loaned money to Lev Parnas, the indicted associate of Rudy Giuliani, as Parnas maneuvered to press the Ukrainian government to announce investigations that would help President Donald Trump politically. Congress released WhatsApp text messages between Parnas and Sargeant as part of materials obtained from Parnas. The messages showed that Sargeant helped fund some of Parnas’ travel and was supportive of efforts by Parnas and Giuliani to convince Trump to remove US Ambassador to Ukraine Marie Yovanovitch.

In February 2026, President Trump stated that Harry Sargeant III did not have authority to act on behalf of the United States and emphasized that only individuals approved by the State Department may represent the government, following a report by The Wall Street Journal regarding Sargeant’s involvement in discussions related to Venezuela’s oil sector. Sargeant was allegedly pushing for the easing of Venezuela’s sanctions, which affected the operations of his investments in the country. He reportedly leveraged this by supporting those in the Trump administration who can help repair the US-Venezuelan relations. Sargeant has denied lobbying against hardline sanctions toward Venezuela.

== Personal life ==
Harry Sargeant III is married to Deborah Sargeant and they have two children.

His brother, Daniel Sargeant, is the father of racing drivers Dalton and Logan Sargeant.
