= 2023 United States Grand Prix =

Eighteenth round of the 2023 F1 season

Race 18 of 22 in the 2023 Formula One World Championship
← Previous race	Next race →
- Layout of the Circuit of the Americas

Race details
- Date: October 22, 2023
- Official name: Formula 1 Lenovo United States Grand Prix 2023
- Location: Circuit of the Americas; Austin, Texas, United States
- Course: Permanent racing facility
- Course length: 5.513 km (3.426 miles)
- Distance: 56 laps, 308.405 km (191.634 miles)
- Weather: Sunny
- Attendance: 432,000

Pole position
Driver	(Monaco) Charles Leclerc	Ferrari
- Time: 1:34.723

Fastest lap
Driver	(Japan) Yuki Tsunoda	AlphaTauri-Honda RBPT
- Time: 1:38.139 on lap 56

Podium
First	(Netherlands) Max Verstappen	Red Bull Racing-Honda RBPT
Second	(United Kingdom) Lando Norris	McLaren-Mercedes
Third	(Spain) Carlos Sainz Jr.	Ferrari

The 2023 United States Grand Prix (officially known as the Formula 1 Lenovo United States Grand Prix 2023) was a Formula One motor race that took place on October 22, 2023, at the Circuit of the Americas in Austin, Texas, United States. It was the eighteenth round of the 2023 Formula One World Championship and the fifth Grand Prix weekend of the season to utilise the sprint format.

Max Verstappen won both races. In the main race, Lewis Hamilton and Charles Leclerc finished second and sixth respectively but were disqualified due to post-race scrutineering determining that their skid blocks were excessively worn. The race became the first that ended with more than one driver disqualified since the 2019 Japanese Grand Prix. Due to this, Logan Sargeant was promoted to tenth place and scored his first career point. It was the only time when Sargeant scored points in his career as he was dropped by Williams midway through the following season. This disqualification of Hamilton and Leclerc promoted McLaren's Lando Norris to second place, on his 100th race start, and Carlos Sainz Jr. of Ferrari to third, taking the final podium place.

== Background ==
The event was held across the weekend of October 20–22. It was the eighteenth round of the 2023 Formula One World Championship and the 52nd running of the United States Grand Prix. The weekend was the fifth of six in the season to follow the sprint format.

=== Championship standings before the race ===
Coming into the weekend, Max Verstappen, who took his third consecutive Drivers' Champion title at the preceding Qatar Grand Prix, led the Drivers' Championship by 209 points from teammate Sergio Pérez, with Lewis Hamilton third, a further 30 points behind. Red Bull Racing, having secured the title at the Japanese Grand Prix, led the Constructors' Championship over Mercedes by 331 points and Ferrari by a further 28 points.

=== Entrants ===
The drivers and teams were the same as the season entry list with the exception of the returning Daniel Ricciardo, who replaced Nyck de Vries at AlphaTauri starting at the Hungarian Grand Prix. Ricciardo's seat was filled by Liam Lawson in the previous five Grands Prix after Ricciardo was forced to withdraw due to a broken metacarpal bone in a crash during the second practice of the Dutch Grand Prix.

=== Tyre choices ===
Tyre supplier Pirelli brought the C2, C3 and C4 tyre compounds (designated hard, medium, and soft, respectively) for teams to use at the event.

== Practice ==
The only free practice session was held on October 20, 2023, at 12:30 local time (UTC−5). Max Verstappen topped the session, followed by Ferrari driver Charles Leclerc and Mercedes driver Lewis Hamilton in second and third, respectively. Lance Stroll of Aston Martin ran only five laps before he was forced to return to the pits due to brake issues.

== Qualifying ==
Qualifying was held on October 20, 2023, at 16:00 local time (UTC−5), and determined the starting grid for the main race.

=== Qualifying report ===
Charles Leclerc took pole position ahead of Lando Norris and Lewis Hamilton. Championship leader Max Verstappen qualified in sixth after having a lap time fast enough for pole position deleted due to track limits. Aston Martin suffered a double Q1 knockout with Fernando Alonso and Lance Stroll placing seventeenth and nineteenth, respectively.

=== Qualifying classification ===
Pos.	No.	Driver	Constructor	Qualifying times			Final grid
Pos.	No.	Driver	Constructor	Q1	Q2	Q3	Final grid
1	16	(Monaco) Charles Leclerc	Ferrari	1:36.061	1:35.004	1:34.723	1
2	4	(United Kingdom) Lando Norris	McLaren-Mercedes	1:35.110	1:35.441	1:34.853	2
3	44	(United Kingdom) Lewis Hamilton	Mercedes	1:35.091	1:35.240	1:34.862	3
4	55	(Spain) Carlos Sainz Jr.	Ferrari	1:35.824	1:35.302	1:34.945	4
5	63	(United Kingdom) George Russell	Mercedes	1:36.165	1:35.606	1:35.079	5
6	1	(Netherlands) Max Verstappen	Red Bull Racing-Honda RBPT	1:35.346	1:35.008	1:35.081	6
7	10	(France) Pierre Gasly	Alpine-Renault	1:36.158	1:35.496	1:35.089	7
8	31	(France) Esteban Ocon	Alpine-Renault	1:36.131	1:35.413	1:35.154	8
9	11	(Mexico) Sergio Pérez	Red Bull Racing-Honda RBPT	1:35.989	1:35.679	1:35.173	9
10	81	(Australia) Oscar Piastri	McLaren-Mercedes	1:36.064	1:35.576	1:35.467	10
11	22	(Japan) Yuki Tsunoda	AlphaTauri-Honda RBPT	1:35.913	1:35.697	N/A	11
12	24	(China) Zhou Guanyu	Alfa Romeo-Ferrari	1:36.052	1:35.698	N/A	12
13	77	(Finland) Valtteri Bottas	Alfa Romeo-Ferrari	1:36.082	1:35.858	N/A	13
14	20	(Denmark) Kevin Magnussen	Haas-Ferrari	1:36.009	1:35.880	N/A	PL^{a}
15	3	(Australia) Daniel Ricciardo	AlphaTauri-Honda RBPT	1:36.213	1:35.974	N/A	14
16	27	(Germany) Nico Hülkenberg	Haas-Ferrari	1:36.235	N/A	N/A	PL^{b}
17	14	(Spain) Fernando Alonso	Aston Martin Aramco-Mercedes	1:36.268	N/A	N/A	PL^{c}
18	23	(Thailand) Alexander Albon	Williams-Mercedes	1:36.315	N/A	N/A	15
19	18	(Canada) Lance Stroll	Aston Martin Aramco-Mercedes	1:36.589	N/A	N/A	PL^{d}
20	2	(United States) Logan Sargeant	Williams-Mercedes	1:36.827	N/A	N/A	16
107% time: 1:41.747

Notes

- ^a – Kevin Magnussen qualified 14th, but he was required to start the race from the pit lane as elements of different specifications from the ones originally used were installed on his car during parc fermé conditions.
- ^b – Nico Hülkenberg qualified 16th, but he was required to start the race from the pit lane as elements of different specifications from the ones originally used were installed on his car during parc fermé conditions.
- ^c – Fernando Alonso qualified 17th, but he was required to start the race from the pit lane as elements of different specifications from the ones originally used were installed on his car during parc fermé conditions.
- ^d – Lance Stroll qualified 19th, but he was required to start the race from the pit lane as elements of different specifications from the ones originally used were installed on his car during parc fermé conditions.

== Sprint shootout ==
The sprint shootout was held on October 21, 2023, at 12:30 local time (UTC−5), and determined the starting grid for the sprint.

=== Sprint shootout classification ===
Pos.	No.	Driver	Constructor	Qualifying times			Sprint grid
Pos.	No.	Driver	Constructor	SQ1	SQ2	SQ3	Sprint grid
1	1	(Netherlands) Max Verstappen	Red Bull Racing-Honda RBPT	1:35.997	1:35.181	1:34.538	1
2	16	(Monaco) Charles Leclerc	Ferrari	1:35.999	1:35.386	1:34.593	2
3	44	(United Kingdom) Lewis Hamilton	Mercedes	1:36.393	1:35.887	1:34.607	3
4	4	(United Kingdom) Lando Norris	McLaren-Mercedes	1:36.499	1:35.594	1:34.639	4
5	81	(Australia) Oscar Piastri	McLaren-Mercedes	1:36.703	1:35.753	1:34.894	5
6	55	(Spain) Carlos Sainz Jr.	Ferrari	1:36.268	1:35.542	1:34.939	6
7	11	(Mexico) Sergio Pérez	Red Bull Racing-Honda RBPT	1:36.347	1:35.718	1:35.041	7
8	63	(United Kingdom) George Russell	Mercedes	1:36.281	1:35.847	1:35.199	11^{a}
9	23	(Thailand) Alexander Albon	Williams-Mercedes	1:36.230	1:35.947	1:35.366	8
10	10	(France) Pierre Gasly	Alpine-Renault	1:36.595	1:35.785	1:35.897	9
11	3	(Australia) Daniel Ricciardo	AlphaTauri-Honda RBPT	1:36.737	1:35.978	N/A	10
12	14	(Spain) Fernando Alonso	Aston Martin Aramco-Mercedes	1:36.365	1:36.087	N/A	12
13	31	(France) Esteban Ocon	Alpine-Renault	1:36.372	1:36.137	N/A	13
14	18	(Canada) Lance Stroll	Aston Martin Aramco-Mercedes	1:36.575	1:36.181	N/A	14
15	24	(China) Zhou Guanyu	Alfa Romeo-Ferrari	1:36.554	1:36.182	N/A	15
16	27	(Germany) Nico Hülkenberg	Haas-Ferrari	1:36.749	N/A	N/A	16
17	20	(Denmark) Kevin Magnussen	Haas-Ferrari	1:36.922^{b}	N/A	N/A	17
18	77	(Finland) Valtteri Bottas	Alfa Romeo-Ferrari	1:36.922^{b}	N/A	N/A	18
19	22	(Japan) Yuki Tsunoda	AlphaTauri-Honda RBPT	1:36.945	N/A	N/A	19
20	2	(United States) Logan Sargeant	Williams-Mercedes	1:37.186	N/A	N/A	20
107% time: 1:42.716

Notes

- ^a – George Russell received a three-place grid penalty for impeding Charles Leclerc in SQ1.
- ^b – Kevin Magnussen and Valtteri Bottas set identical lap times in SQ1. Magnussen was qualified ahead of Bottas as he set his time earlier.

== Sprint ==
The sprint was held on October 21, 2023, at 17:00 local time (UTC−5), and was run for 19 laps.

=== Sprint report ===
Max Verstappen won the race comfortably from Lewis Hamilton and Charles Leclerc. Having suffered from them earlier in the free practice session, Lance Stroll retired with brake issues.

=== Sprint classification ===
Pos.	No.	Driver	Constructor	Laps	Time/Retired	Grid	Points
1	1	(Netherlands) Max Verstappen	Red Bull Racing-Honda RBPT	19	31:30.849	1	8
2	44	(United Kingdom) Lewis Hamilton	Mercedes	19	+9.465	3	7
3	16	(Monaco) Charles Leclerc	Ferrari	19	+17.987	2	6
4	4	(United Kingdom) Lando Norris	McLaren-Mercedes	19	+18.863	4	5
5	11	(Mexico) Sergio Pérez	Red Bull Racing-Honda RBPT	19	+22.928	7	4
6	55	(Spain) Carlos Sainz Jr.	Ferrari	19	+28.307	6	3
7	10	(France) Pierre Gasly	Alpine-Renault	19	+32.403	9	2
8	63	(United Kingdom) George Russell	Mercedes	19	+34.250^{a}	11	1
9	23	(Thailand) Alexander Albon	Williams-Mercedes	19	+34.567	8	
10	81	(Australia) Oscar Piastri	McLaren-Mercedes	19	+42.403	5	
11	31	(France) Esteban Ocon	Alpine-Renault	19	+44.986	13	
12	3	(Australia) Daniel Ricciardo	AlphaTauri-Honda RBPT	19	+45.509	10	
13	14	(Spain) Fernando Alonso	Aston Martin Aramco-Mercedes	19	+49.086	12	
14	22	(Japan) Yuki Tsunoda	AlphaTauri-Honda RBPT	19	+49.733	19	
15	27	(Germany) Nico Hülkenberg	Haas-Ferrari	19	+56.650	16	
16	77	(Finland) Valtteri Bottas	Alfa Romeo-Ferrari	19	+1:04.401	18	
17	24	(China) Zhou Guanyu	Alfa Romeo-Ferrari	19	+1:07.972^{b}	15	
18	20	(Denmark) Kevin Magnussen	Haas-Ferrari	19	+1:11.122	17	
19	2	(United States) Logan Sargeant	Williams-Mercedes	19	+1:11.449	20	
Ret	18	(Canada) Lance Stroll	Aston Martin Aramco-Mercedes	16	Brakes	14	
Fastest lap: (Netherlands) Max Verstappen (Red Bull Racing-Honda RBPT) – 1:39.060 (lap 2)

Notes

- ^a – George Russell finished seventh, but he received a five-second time penalty for leaving the track and gaining an advantage.
- ^b – Zhou Guanyu finished 16th, but he received a five-second time penalty for leaving the track and gaining an advantage.

== Race ==
The race was held on October 22, 2023, at 14:00 local time (UTC−5), and was run for 56 laps.

=== Race report ===
Max Verstappen, despite brake issues, won the race, his fifteenth victory in the season. Verstappen held off Lewis Hamilton and Lando Norris, who had both led during the race and ultimately finished second and third respectively. Both drivers showed pace, getting closer to Verstappen during the closing stages. Yuki Tsunoda achieved the fastest lap. There were three retirements. Oscar Piastri retired with damage to his radiator and a water leak after making contact with Esteban Ocon's sidepods, which also caused Ocon to retire. Fernando Alonso, who had to start from the pit lane, suffered from failures of the rear suspension and the floor.

Hamilton and polesitter Charles Leclerc, who finished second and sixth respectively, were both disqualified after failing a post-race plank test. Verstappen noted that the fact that a sprint was held may have contributed to the excessive wear to the plank that lead to the disqualification of Leclerc and Hamilton. This disqualification means that Leclerc became the first driver to start on pole position and get disqualified since Ralf Schumacher at the 2004 Canadian Grand Prix with himself and Hamilton the first drivers to be disqualified for excessive plank wear since Michael Schumacher at the 1994 Belgian Grand Prix. This also means that he became the first Ferrari driver that failed to finish, failed to start, and was disqualified from at least one race where he started on pole position. This promoted Norris to second place, Sainz to third, and gave Logan Sargeant his first (and only) Formula One point. This marked the first time an American had scored in Formula One since Michael Andretti at the 1993 Italian Grand Prix.

==== Track limits controversies ====
Following the race, still images appeared to show both Sergio Pérez and Alexander Albon breaching track limits at turn 6. However, these breaches went undetected as, according to the FIA, the CCTV camera being used to monitor track limits at that corner had been placed at an inadequate viewing position. Lando Norris also admitted to breaching track limits at this corner several times during the race. The FIA stated they would "update [their] monitoring infrastructure to provide enhanced coverage to ensure that any potential breaches can reliably be identified during the race in future." However, thirteen days after the race, the Haas team filed a right of review request, with Reuters indicating it was regarding the turn 6 track limits. Depending on the outcome of the review, the results of the race could be changed. According to Motorsport.com, the onboard evidence Haas was using for its right of review indicated that Lance Stroll and the Williams drivers Alex Albon and Logan Sargeant committed multiple track limit infringements that were not detected. McLaren team principal Andrea Stella criticised Haas for their belated use of the right of review in the same article. It was subsequently confirmed that a hearing on November 8 would decide whether Haas's request would be upheld. Williams, Aston Martin, and Red Bull were required to attend this hearing along with Haas. However, the hearing was delayed by the FIA until November 9 to give stewards additional time to "independently consider the submissions made". At the hearing, the Haas right of review request was rejected on the grounds of the evidence submitted by Haas being evidence that was not new (as in unavailable at the time of the original investigation by the stewards after the race) or relevant, and the results of the race were allowed to stand. Despite rejecting the Haas appeal, the stewards did criticise the FIA's policing of track limits in Formula One stating 'they find their inability to enforce standards for track limits for all competitors to be completely unsatisfactory' urging the governing body to find better solutions to police track limits in the sport ahead of the 2024 season. The full stewards verdict also revealed that representatives from the McLaren and Ferrari teams also chose to attend the hearing voluntarily along with the representatives from the four teams summoned as well as representatives from the FIA itself.

=== Race classification ===
Pos.	No.	Driver	Constructor	Laps	Time/Retired	Grid	Points
1	1	(Netherlands) Max Verstappen	Red Bull Racing-Honda RBPT	56	1:35:21.362	6	25
2	4	(United Kingdom) Lando Norris	McLaren-Mercedes	56	+10.730	2	18
3	55	(Spain) Carlos Sainz Jr.	Ferrari	56	+15.134	4	15
4	11	(Mexico) Sergio Pérez	Red Bull Racing-Honda RBPT	56	+18.460	9	12
5	63	(United Kingdom) George Russell	Mercedes	56	+24.999	5	10
6	10	(France) Pierre Gasly	Alpine-Renault	56	+47.996	7	8
7	18	(Canada) Lance Stroll	Aston Martin Aramco-Mercedes	56	+48.696	PL	6
8	22	(Japan) Yuki Tsunoda	AlphaTauri-Honda RBPT	56	+1:14.385	11	5^{1}
9	23	(Thailand) Alexander Albon	Williams-Mercedes	56	+1:26.714^{2}	15	2
10	2	(United States) Logan Sargeant	Williams-Mercedes	56	+1:27.998	16	1
11	27	(Germany) Nico Hülkenberg	Haas-Ferrari	56	+1:29.904	PL	
12	77	(Finland) Valtteri Bottas	Alfa Romeo-Ferrari	56	+1:38.601	13	
13	24	(China) Zhou Guanyu	Alfa Romeo-Ferrari	55	+1 lap	12	
14	20	(Denmark) Kevin Magnussen	Haas-Ferrari	55	+1 lap	PL	
15	3	(Australia) Daniel Ricciardo	AlphaTauri-Honda RBPT	55	+1 lap	14	
Ret	14	(Spain) Fernando Alonso	Aston Martin Aramco-Mercedes	49	Undertray	PL	
Ret	81	(Australia) Oscar Piastri	McLaren-Mercedes	10	Collision damage	10	
Ret	31	(France) Esteban Ocon	Alpine-Renault	6	Collision damage	8	
DSQ	44	(United Kingdom) Lewis Hamilton	Mercedes	56	Skid block^{3}	3	
DSQ	16	(Monaco) Charles Leclerc	Ferrari	56	Skid block^{3}	1	
Fastest lap: (Japan) Yuki Tsunoda (AlphaTauri-Honda RBPT) – 1:38.139 (lap 56)

Notes

- ^1 – Includes one point for fastest lap.
- ^2 – Alexander Albon received a five-second time penalty for exceeding track limits. His final position was not affected by the penalty.
- ^3 – Lewis Hamilton and Charles Leclerc finished second and sixth, respectively, but were disqualified for having excessive wear on their rear skid blocks.

== Championship standings after the race ==
Drivers' Championship standings

Pos.	Driver	Points
1	(Netherlands) **Max Verstappen***	466
2	(Mexico) Sergio Pérez	240
3	(United Kingdom) Lewis Hamilton	201
4	(Spain) Fernando Alonso	183
5	(Spain) Carlos Sainz Jr.	171

Constructors' Championship standings

	Pos.	Constructor	Points
	1	(Austria) **Red Bull Racing-Honda RBPT***	706
	2	(Germany) Mercedes	344
	3	(Italy) Ferrari	322
1	4	(United Kingdom) McLaren-Mercedes	242
1	5	(United Kingdom) Aston Martin Aramco-Mercedes	236

- Note: Only the top five positions are included for both sets of standings.
- Competitors in bold and marked with an asterisk are the 2023 World Champions.

Previous race: 2023 Qatar Grand Prix	FIA Formula One World Championship; 2023 season	Next race: 2023 Mexico City Grand Prix
Previous race: 2022 United States Grand Prix	United States Grand Prix	Next race: 2024 United States Grand Prix
