= 2023 Bahrain Grand Prix =

First round of the 2023 Formula One season

Race 1 of 22 (Note: At the time of the event Formula One planned to hold twenty-three Grands Prix.) in the 2023 Formula One World Championship
Next race →
- Layout of the Bahrain International Circuit

Race details
- Date: 5 March 2023
- Official name: Formula 1 Gulf Air Bahrain Grand Prix 2023
- Location: Bahrain International Circuit; Sakhir, Bahrain
- Course: Permanent racing facility
- Course length: 5.412 km (3.363 miles)
- Distance: 57 laps, 308.238 km (190.253 miles)
- Weather: Clear
- Attendance: 99,500

Pole position
Driver	(Netherlands) Max Verstappen	Red Bull Racing-Honda RBPT
- Time: 1:29.708

Fastest lap
Driver	(China) Zhou Guanyu	Alfa Romeo-Ferrari
- Time: 1:33.996 on lap 56

Podium
First	(Netherlands) Max Verstappen	Red Bull Racing-Honda RBPT
Second	(Mexico) Sergio Pérez	Red Bull Racing-Honda RBPT
Third	(Spain) Fernando Alonso	Aston Martin-Mercedes

The 2023 Bahrain Grand Prix (officially known as the Formula 1 Gulf Air Bahrain Grand Prix 2023) was a Formula One motor race that was held on 5 March 2023 at the Bahrain International Circuit in Sakhir, Bahrain. It was the opening round of the 2023 Formula One World Championship.

Red Bull Racing driver Max Verstappen took pole position and won the race, ahead of his teammate Sergio Pérez in what was their first 1-2 finish of the season. Fernando Alonso of Aston Martin in third. This was only Alonso's second podium since the 2014 Hungarian Grand Prix, and the first of eight for the season. The race also saw the Formula One debuts of Oscar Piastri and Logan Sargeant.

== Background ==
The event was held across the weekend of 3–5 March. It was the opening round of the 2023 Formula One World Championship.

=== Entrants ===
The drivers and teams were the same as the season entry list with no additional stand-in drivers for the race.

Oscar Piastri, Nyck de Vries and Logan Sargeant made their Formula One Grand Prix season debuts with McLaren, AlphaTauri and Williams, respectively, although De Vries made his Formula One Grand Prix debut at the 2022 Italian Grand Prix for Williams. This race also marked the return of Nico Hülkenberg, who last raced in the 2022 Saudi Arabian Grand Prix, this time, Hülkenberg returned to drive for Haas.

=== Tyre choices ===
Tyre supplier Pirelli brought the C1, C2, and C3 tyre compounds (designated hard, medium, and soft, respectively) for teams to use at the event.

=== Track changes ===
The third DRS activation point was moved 80 metres (260 ft) farther ahead, being positioned 250 metres (820 ft) after turn 15.

== Qualifying ==
Qualifying was held on 4 March 2023 at 18:00 local time (UTC+3).

=== Qualifying report ===
At the beginning of Q1, a piece of the front wheel brow of Charles Leclerc's car fell off during a lock-up at turn one, causing the session to be red flagged. At the end of Q1 Lando Norris and Logan Sargeant set the same exact time to place fifteenth and sixteenth, but Norris was moved through to Q2, having completed his lap before Sargeant. During Q2, Alexander Albon went off track at the turn 5/6/7 esses, preventing him from setting a time. After the first runs of Q3, Charles Leclerc was seen getting out of his Ferrari, sparking reliability concerns for the Monagasque's car, but he later revealed that the team made the decision to save a set of tires for the race. Ultimately, Max Verstappen took pole position by nearly two tenths of a second, with a time of 1:29.708.

=== Qualifying classification ===
Pos.	No.	Driver	Constructor	Qualifying times			Final grid
Pos.	No.	Driver	Constructor	Q1	Q2	Q3	Final grid
1	1	(Netherlands) Max Verstappen	Red Bull Racing-Honda RBPT	1:31.295	1:30.503	1:29.708	1
2	11	(Mexico) Sergio Pérez	Red Bull Racing-Honda RBPT	1:31.479	1:30.746	1:29.846	2
3	16	(Monaco) Charles Leclerc	Ferrari	1:31.094	1:30.282	1:30.000	3
4	55	(Spain) Carlos Sainz Jr.	Ferrari	1:30.993	1:30.515	1:30.154	4
5	14	(Spain) Fernando Alonso	Aston Martin Aramco-Mercedes	1:31.158	1:30.645	1:30.336	5
6	63	(United Kingdom) George Russell	Mercedes	1:31.057	1:30.507	1:30.340	6
7	44	(United Kingdom) Lewis Hamilton	Mercedes	1:31.543	1:30.513	1:30.384	7
8	18	(Canada) Lance Stroll	Aston Martin Aramco-Mercedes	1:31.184	1:31.127	1:30.836	8
9	31	(France) Esteban Ocon	Alpine-Renault	1:31.508	1:30.914	1:30.984	9
10	27	(Germany) Nico Hülkenberg	Haas-Ferrari	1:31.204	1:30.809	No time	10
11	4	(United Kingdom) Lando Norris	McLaren-Mercedes	1:31.652^{a}	1:31.381	N/A	11
12	77	(Finland) Valtteri Bottas	Alfa Romeo-Ferrari	1:31.504	1:31.443	N/A	12
13	24	(China) Zhou Guanyu	Alfa Romeo-Ferrari	1:31.615	1:31.473	N/A	13
14	22	(Japan) Yuki Tsunoda	AlphaTauri-Honda RBPT	1:31.400	1:32.510	N/A	14
15	23	(Thailand) Alexander Albon	Williams-Mercedes	1:31.461	No time	N/A	15
16	2	(United States) Logan Sargeant	Williams-Mercedes	1:31.652^{a}	N/A	N/A	16
17	20	(Denmark) Kevin Magnussen	Haas-Ferrari	1:31.892	N/A	N/A	17
18	81	(Australia) Oscar Piastri	McLaren-Mercedes	1:32.101	N/A	N/A	18
19	21	(Netherlands) Nyck de Vries	AlphaTauri-Honda RBPT	1:32.121	N/A	N/A	19
20	10	(France) Pierre Gasly	Alpine-Renault	1:32.181	N/A	N/A	20
107% time: 1:37.362

Notes

- ^a – Lando Norris and Logan Sargeant set identical lap times in Q1. Norris advanced to Q2 as he set his time earlier.

== Race ==
The race was held on 5 March 2023 at 18:00 local time (UTC+3).

=== Race report ===
Max Verstappen led comfortably from the start, only losing the lead briefly during the first round of pit stops. Sergio Pérez was slow away at the start and lost second place to a fast starting Charles Leclerc. Fernando Alonso and Lewis Hamilton battled on the run down to turn 4, Alonso was hit by his teammate Lance Stroll, causing both Aston Martins to lose positions. Alonso came out on top in a wheel-to-wheel battle with George Russell on lap 13, both drivers lost out in the pit stops to Valtteri Bottas in the Alfa Romeo.

Oscar Piastri retired after 13 laps in his Formula One debut with an electrical failure. Meanwhile his teammate Lando Norris also had engine issues, this time with the hydraulics, requiring six pit stops to manage the problem. Esteban Ocon picked up a five-second time penalty for lining up in his grid spot incorrectly. He did not serve the full five seconds in the pit, and was given a subsequent ten second time penalty, and then a further five second time penalty for speeding in the pit lane while serving the second penalty.

Pérez made it past Leclerc on lap 26, with Red Bull Racing the only front running team to use the soft tyre for both the first two tyre stints. After the second round of pit stops, Stroll, who was racing with two broken wrists and a broken toe, overtook Russell as the latter came out of the pit on cold tyres, with Stroll having pitted a lap earlier. Alonso and Hamilton engaged in a battle for fifth place. Alonso overtook Hamilton into turn 4 on lap 37 before a snap of oversteer on the corner exit for Alonso allowed Hamilton back past. One lap later Alonso pulled off an overtake at turn 10.

Leclerc's race came to an end on lap 41, with his car suffering a mechanical failure while running in third, bringing out the virtual safety car. Alonso overtook Carlos Sainz Jr. using DRS on the run down to turn 11 on lap 45. Meanwhile, Pierre Gasly overtook Alexander Albon for ninth place, having started from last. Zhou Guanyu pitted on the penultimate lap for soft tyres, and set the fastest lap of the race on the final lap.

Verstappen took his first win in Bahrain by almost 12 seconds ahead of teammate Pérez and gave Red Bull their first win in Bahrain since Sebastian Vettel won in 2013. Alonso finished third, his first podium since the 2021 Qatar Grand Prix and Aston Martin's first since the 2021 Azerbaijan Grand Prix.

=== Race classification ===
Pos.	No.	Driver	Constructor	Laps	Time/Retired	Grid	Points
1	1	(Netherlands) Max Verstappen	Red Bull Racing-Honda RBPT	57	1:33:56.736	1	25
2	11	(Mexico) Sergio Pérez	Red Bull Racing-Honda RBPT	57	+11.987	2	18
3	14	(Spain) Fernando Alonso	Aston Martin Aramco-Mercedes	57	+38.637	5	15
4	55	(Spain) Carlos Sainz Jr.	Ferrari	57	+48.052	4	12
5	44	(United Kingdom) Lewis Hamilton	Mercedes	57	+50.977	7	10
6	18	(Canada) Lance Stroll	Aston Martin Aramco-Mercedes	57	+54.502	8	8
7	63	(United Kingdom) George Russell	Mercedes	57	+55.873	6	6
8	77	(Finland) Valtteri Bottas	Alfa Romeo-Ferrari	57	+1:12.647	12	4
9	10	(France) Pierre Gasly	Alpine-Renault	57	+1:13.753	20	2
10	23	(Thailand) Alexander Albon	Williams-Mercedes	57	+1:29.774	15	1
11	22	(Japan) Yuki Tsunoda	AlphaTauri-Honda RBPT	57	+1:30.870	14	
12	2	(United States) Logan Sargeant	Williams-Mercedes	56	+1 lap	16	
13	20	(Denmark) Kevin Magnussen	Haas-Ferrari	56	+1 lap	17	
14	21	(Netherlands) Nyck de Vries	AlphaTauri-Honda RBPT	56	+1 lap	19	
15	27	(Germany) Nico Hülkenberg	Haas-Ferrari	56	+1 lap^{a}	10	
16	24	(China) Zhou Guanyu	Alfa Romeo-Ferrari	56	+1 lap	13	
17	4	(United Kingdom) Lando Norris	McLaren-Mercedes	55	+2 laps	11	
Ret	31	(France) Esteban Ocon	Alpine-Renault	41	Withdrew	9	
Ret	16	(Monaco) Charles Leclerc	Ferrari	39	Engine	3	
Ret	81	(Australia) Oscar Piastri	McLaren-Mercedes	13	Electrical	18	
Fastest lap: (China) Zhou Guanyu (Alfa Romeo-Ferrari) – 1:33.996 (lap 56)

Notes

- ^a – Nico Hülkenberg received a 15-second time penalty for exceeding track limits. His final position was not affected by the penalty.

== Championship standings after the race ==
Drivers' Championship standings

Pos.	Driver	Points
1	(Netherlands) Max Verstappen	25
2	(Mexico) Sergio Pérez	18
3	(Spain) Fernando Alonso	15
4	(Spain) Carlos Sainz Jr.	12
5	(United Kingdom) Lewis Hamilton	10

Constructors' Championship standings

Pos.	Constructor	Points
1	(Austria) Red Bull Racing-Honda RBPT	43
2	(United Kingdom) Aston Martin Aramco-Mercedes	23
3	(Germany) Mercedes	16
4	(Italy) Ferrari	12
5	(Switzerland) Alfa Romeo-Ferrari	4

- Note: Only the top five positions are included for both sets of standings.

== See also ==
- 2023 Sakhir Formula 2 round
- 2023 Sakhir Formula 3 round

== Notes ==
Previous race: 2022 Abu Dhabi Grand Prix	FIA Formula One World Championship; 2023 season	Next race: 2023 Saudi Arabian Grand Prix
Previous race: 2022 Bahrain Grand Prix	Bahrain Grand Prix	Next race: 2024 Bahrain Grand Prix
