= Ferrari SF90 =

2019 Formula One racing car by Ferrari

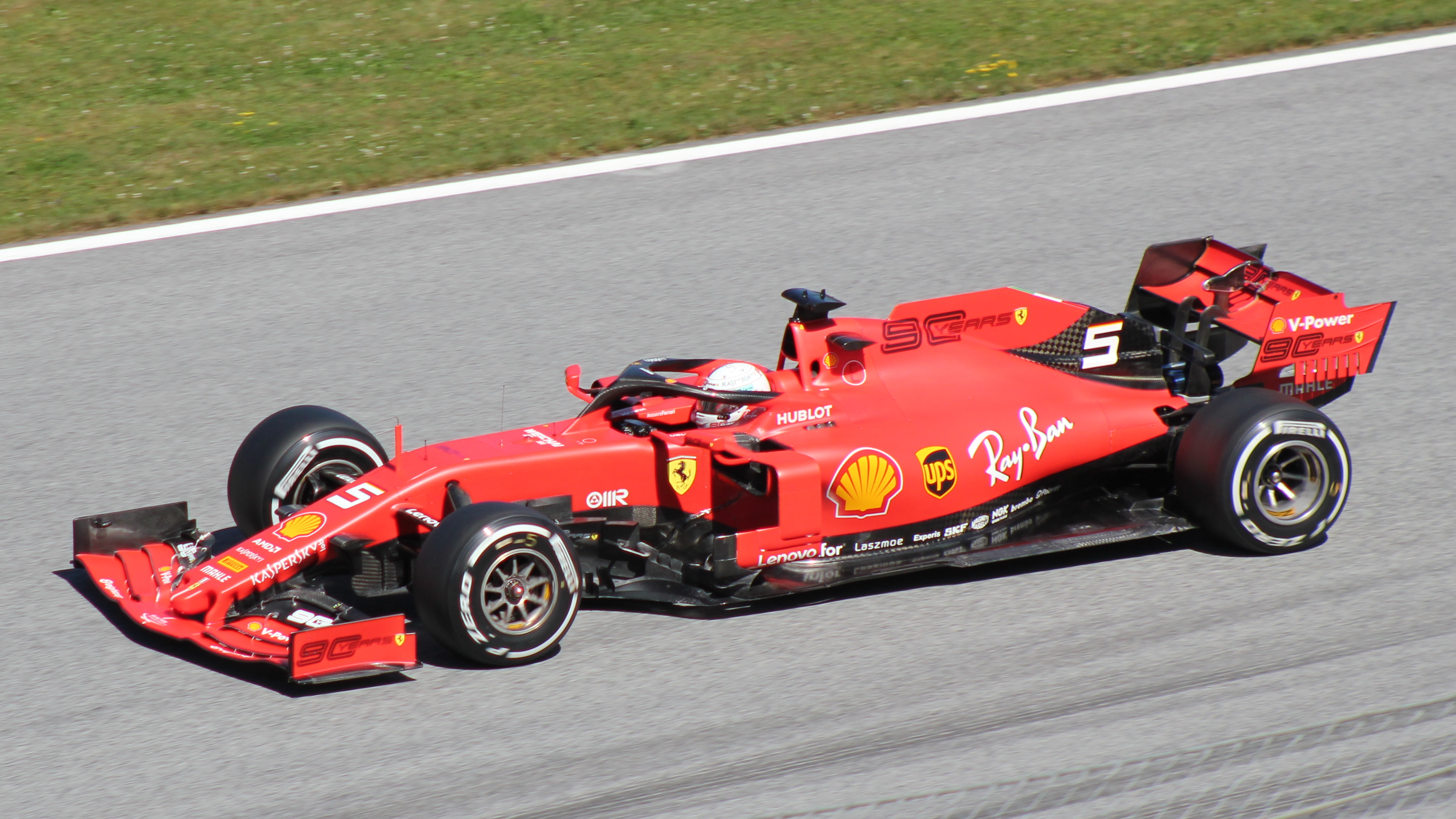
- The Ferrari SF90, driven by Sebastian Vettel during the Austrian Grand Prix
- Category: Formula One
- Constructor: Ferrari
- Designers: Mattia Binotto (Technical Director); Enrico Cardile (Vehicle Project Manager); Fabio Montecchi (Vehicle Project Manager); Andrea De Zordo (Vehicle Project Manager); Corrado Onorato (Deputy Chief Designer); Giorgio Rossetti (Head of Development); Tiziano Battistini (Head of Chassis Design); Maurzio Bocchi (Head of Vehicle Performance); Giacomo Tortora (Head of Performance Development); David Sanchez (Head of Aerodynamics); Enrico Gualtieri (Head of Engine Area); Corrado Iotti (Chief Engineer, Power Unit)
- Predecessor: Ferrari SF71H
- Successor: Ferrari SF1000

Technical specifications
- Suspension (front): Push-rod
- Suspension (rear): Pull-rod
- Length: 5,712 mm (224.9 in)
- Width: 2,000 mm (79 in)
- Height: 950 mm (37 in)
- Wheelbase: 3,652 mm (143.8 in)
- Engine: Ferrari 064 1.6 L (98 cu in) direct injection V6 turbocharged engine limited to 15,000 RPM in a mid-mounted, rear-wheel drive layout
- Electric motor: Ferrari kinetic and thermal energy recovery systems
- Transmission: Eight forward and one reverse gears
- Weight: 743 kg (1,638 lb)
- Fuel: Shell V-Power
- Lubricants: Shell Helix Ultra
- Brakes: Self-ventilating Brembo Carbon disc brakes (front and rear) with electronic control on rear brakes
- Tyres: Pirelli P Zero (dry); Pirelli Cinturato (wet); OZ forged magnesium wheels: 13"

Competition history
- Notable entrants: Scuderia Ferrari Mission Winnow (Note: Ferrari entered rounds 1, 7–16 as "Scuderia Ferrari", and rounds 2–6, 17–21 as "Scuderia Ferrari Mission Winnow".)
- Notable drivers: 5. (Germany) Sebastian Vettel; 16. (Monaco) Charles Leclerc
- Debut: 2019 Australian Grand Prix
- First win: 2019 Belgian Grand Prix
- Last win: 2019 Singapore Grand Prix
- Last event: 2019 Abu Dhabi Grand Prix
Races	Wins	Podiums	Poles	F/Laps
21	3	19	9	6

The Ferrari SF90, also known by its internal name Project 670, is a Formula One racing car designed and constructed by Scuderia Ferrari to compete during the 2019 Formula One World Championship. The chassis was designed by Mattia Binotto, Enrico Cardile, Fabio Montecchi, and David Sanchez with Corrado Iotti leading the powertrain design. It was driven by Sebastian Vettel and Charles Leclerc, who was making his debut for Ferrari. The car made its competitive debut at the 2019 Australian Grand Prix.

== Background ==
=== Naming and launch ===
Ferrari designed and constructed the SF90 as a Formula One car to compete during the 2019 Formula One World Championship. The car was driven by four-time world champion Sebastian Vettel and Ferrari debutant Charles Leclerc in every race of the 2019 season. Ferrari named the car the SF90 to celebrate the company's 90th anniversary and in keeping with tradition Vettel named his car "Lina".

=== Initial design ===
The new regulations for the 2019 season meant that the teams had to adopt a new simpler front wing design and a higher and wider rear wing. Ferrari produced a radical front wing design that tapered downwards from the middle towards the endplates of the wing while Mercedes and Red Bull Racing, their nearest rivals with the Mercedes W10 and the Red Bull RB15, went with a conventional design that is high from middle to end. This design was meant to encourage flow around the tyres with the front wing being below the maximum allowed height. Ferrari's front wing design meant that the majority of the loading would be felt on the middle of the wing and this in turn would cause the air flow to be directed to within the front tyres. This design made the car's downforce levels more predictable, albeit with less downforce overall.

An anonymous aerodynamicist commented that because the front wing did not generate as much downforce as the front wings of some of its rival cars, Ferrari instead had to compensate and increase the size of their barge boards to provide this downforce. This in turn meant that the rear was unable to produce as much downforce as the front going forward in the development of the car. This was likely to lead to a car prone to oversteer, therefore it was anticipated that the SF90 would not be as fast as some of its rivals and the amount of downforce the car would produce would be limited.

Ferrari changed the engine cover on the SF90, making it smaller compared its predecessor, the Ferrari SF71H, in order to save weight and improve aerodynamics. Ferrari adopted a matte finish to the car's livery instead of gloss to save weight. The SF90 also had a reworked cooling system with the engine cover having a smaller inlet, now triangular rather than oval and the radiator air inlets were made larger. The rear bodywork was also remodeled suggesting an increase in rear aerodynamic performance.

=== Pre-season testing ===
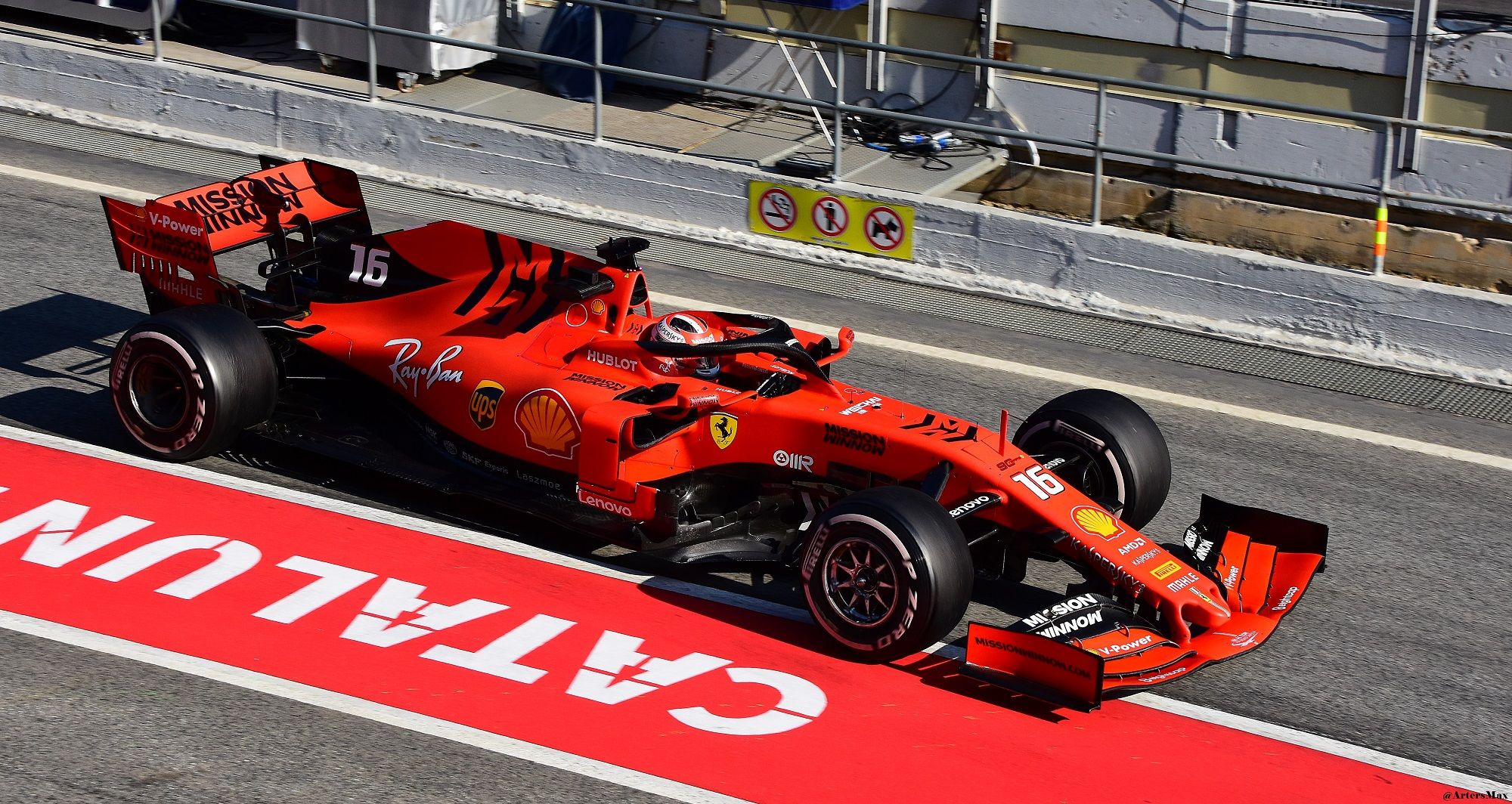
Leclerc at the pre-season testing in Barcelona

Ferrari took a few upgrades to the first test. The most notable of these was the location of the exit for the air that would have come through the side pod. Instead of the traditional place of letting the air out of the rear of the car the SF90 redirected some of the air out behind the base of the halo. This would have two advantages, the first being that by bringing the air up there, it would help to generate extra downforce in the middle of the air and the second benefit would be that the SF90 would be able to manipulate the air flow to its rear wing. A second upgrade that Ferrari brought to the first test was with the wheel. The wheel rim was redesigned with holes in it to transfer heat away from the tyres thus keeping the tyres in their operating window. Although this innovation would not help with the SF90's outright pace it would allow the SF90 to take better care of its tyres therefore improving the cars' race pace.

After the first week of pre-season testing it was the SF90 which had the clear advantage having completed a high number of laps and with both Leclerc and Vettel commenting how comfortable they felt with the car. Although the SF90 finished in eighth and ninth after the first test they only used the harder and therefore slower tyres, when the times were adjusted to show predicted lap time had they all been on the same tyre it was predicted that the SF90 would have been the fastest. (Note: Testing times are rarely a true reflection of a cars' relative pace compared to its rivals. This is because it is unknown what the car's specification is during testing and cars are rarely run to their full potential.)

== Season performance ==
=== Opening rounds ===
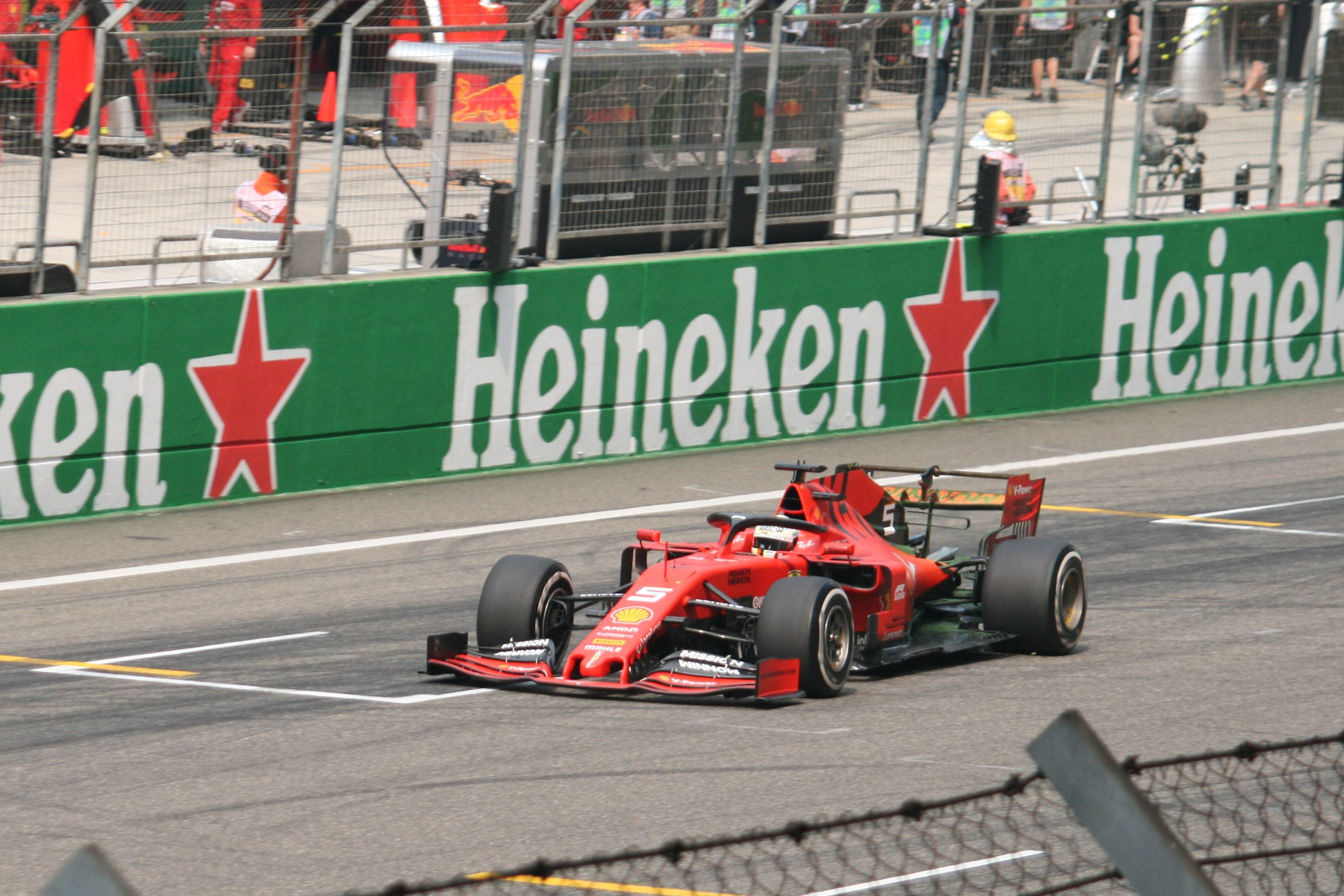
Vettel took third at the Chinese Grand Prix.

At the Australian Grand Prix, the Ferraris lined up third and fifth, driven by Vettel and Leclerc, respectively. During the race, both cars suffered from a lack of overall pace compared to the two Mercedes cars, as well as the Red Bull of Max Verstappen. They finished in fourth and fifth places, respectively. At the Bahrain Grand Prix, Ferrari locked out the front row of the starting grid just as they had done the previous year, with Leclerc setting a new track record in the process. During the race, both cars suffered from issues: Vettel from driver errors and Leclerc with an engine problem that cost him the victory.

At the Chinese Grand Prix, the Ferraris were running close to each other when Leclerc was asked to yield to Vettel, allowing Vettel on an alternate strategy to fight Red Bull's Verstappen for a podium. Leclerc finished fifth himself. At the Azerbaijan Grand Prix, the Ferraris looked to have the measure of the Mercedes in free practice with the Ferrari displaying superior straight line speed. During qualifying, Leclerc crashed out heading into the castle section. The resulting delay of qualifying, and subsequent drop in track temperatures, played into the hands of the Mercedes, who locked out the front row with Vettel salvaging third for Ferrari. Vettel would go on to take a podium the next day while Leclerc, starting from tenth, fought through the field to finish fifth, setting the fastest lap and taking the accompanying point.

=== European and Canadian rounds ===
At the Spanish Grand Prix, neither Ferrari finished on the podium, with Vettel fourth and Leclerc fifth. At the Monaco Grand Prix, the team bounced back, with Vettel taking Ferrari's best result of the season in second place. Leclerc only managed to qualify 16th after a strategy error during qualifying; Leclerc also had to retire from the race following a puncture. At the Canadian Grand Prix, Ferrari were the favoUrites to win with their superior straight line speed. Vettel took pole position while Leclerc managed third behind Lewis Hamilton. During the race, Vettel and Hamilton dueled with Vettel managing to stay ahead of Hamilton. On lap 48, Vettel went off the track and rejoined in front of Hamilton, which resulted in Vettel being given a penalty for rejoining the track dangerously. As a result, Ferrari missed out on their first victory of the season due to Vettel's controversial penalty, although Ferrari subsequently announced that they would appeal. The FIA upheld the penalty, stating that Ferrari did not supply enough new evidence to support their stance.

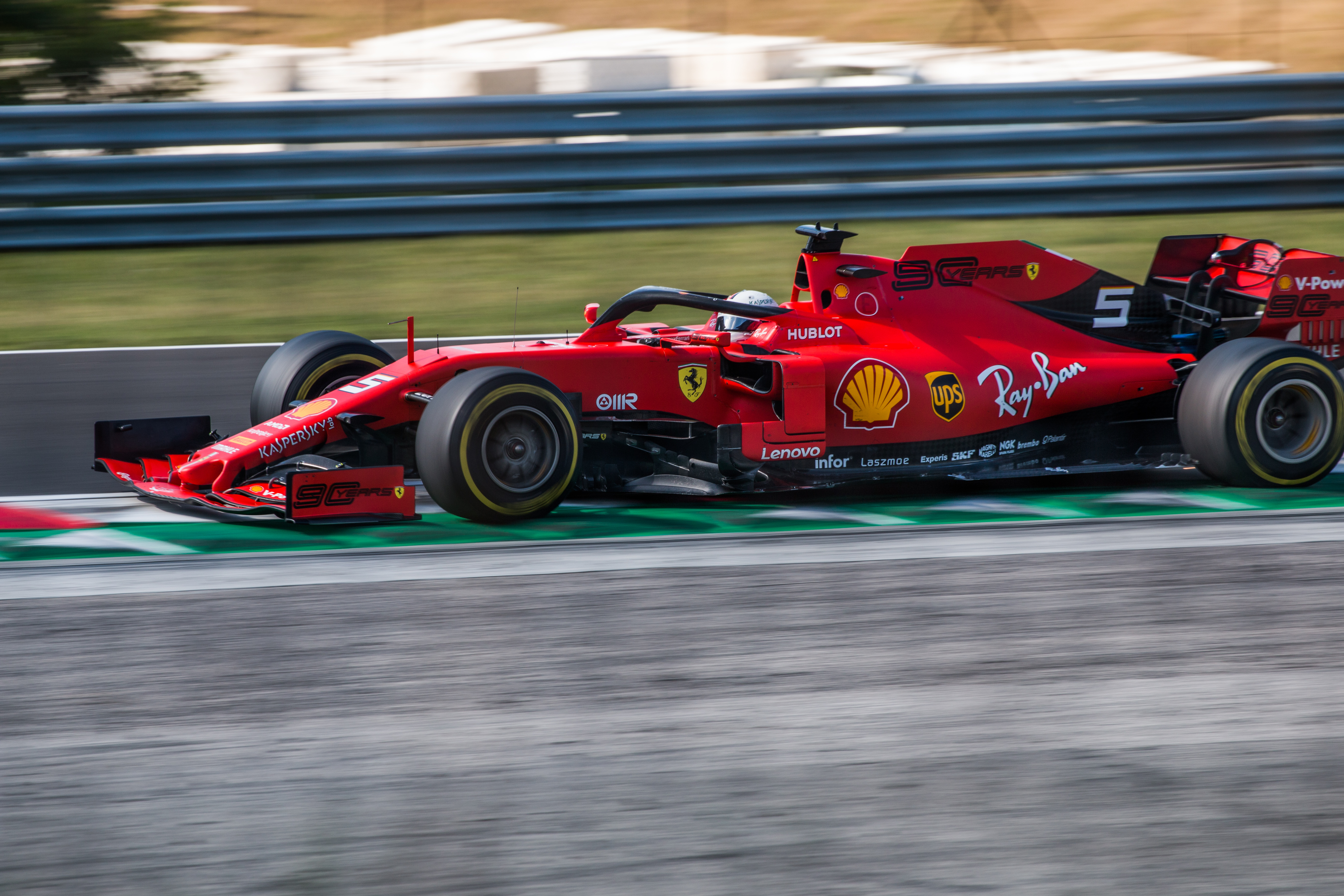
Vettel achieved third place at the Hungarian Grand Prix.

At the French Grand Prix, Leclerc took third in qualifying while Vettel was hampered by an engine issue and started ninth. During the race Leclerc took a podium while Vettel finished in fifth. At the Austrian Grand Prix, Leclerc took his second pole position of his career while Vettel did not set a time in Q3 due to mechanical issues. During the race, an intense battle developed between Verstappen and Leclerc, which culminated in the Red Bull overtaking up the inside heading into turn 2. Leclerc was pushed wide and had to use the runoff area and despite an investigation being launched into the overtaking maneuver it was found to be lawful. Vettel finished off the podium in fourth having started ninth.

At the British Grand Prix, Leclerc qualified third and Vettel sixth. During the race, Vettel and Verstappen collided which saw Vettel fall back to finish 16th while Leclerc took his fourth consecutive podium. At the German Grand Prix, where Ferrari seemed to be competitive for pole position, the team had mechanical issues for Vettel in Q1 and Leclerc in Q3. In a rain-affected race, Vettel managed to finish second after starting 20th while Leclerc crashed out of the Grand Prix. The last race before the summer break was a poor performance for Ferrari. Leclerc and Vettel qualified fourth and fifth respectively at the Hungarian Grand Prix. In the race, the Ferrari SF90 was not competitive and both drivers finished the race one minute behind race winner Hamilton, with Vettel (on an alternate strategy) in third and Leclerc fourth.

=== Post-summer break rounds ===
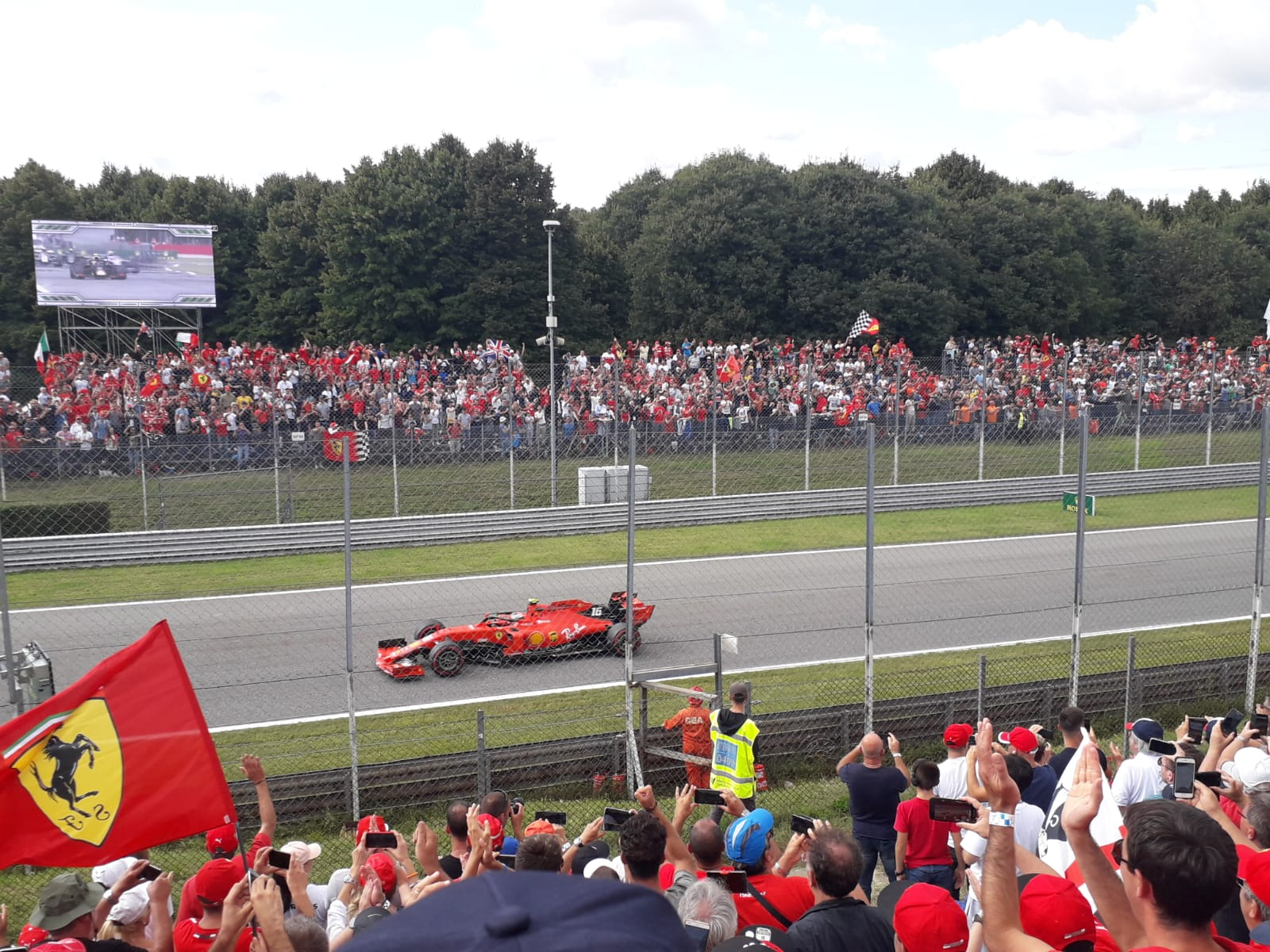
Leclerc took his second career victory in front of the home fans at the Italian Grand Prix.

Ferrari entered the Belgian Grand Prix, as well as the Italian Grand Prix, as favourites with a car which is highly suited to the circuits. Leclerc subsequently won both races, taking his debut win at the Belgian Grand Prix. Both Grands Prix were only won narrowly, with Mercedes finishing second and third on both occasions within a second of Leclerc. Vettel finished fourth in Belgium and 13th in Italy following a collision with Lance Stroll.

For the Singapore Grand Prix, Ferrari introduced new aero updates with new fins on the car's floor and a new nose in a bid to improve downforce among other smaller changes to the cars aerodynamics. The team managed a 1–3 qualifying result and Vettel won the race from pole-sitter Leclerc to secure Ferrari's first 1–2 finish since the 2017 Hungarian Grand Prix and Vettel's first win since the 2018 Belgian Grand Prix. Ferrari continued to show their improved pace in the Russian Grand Prix, with another 1–3 qualifying result. A non-standard Mercedes strategy, a mechanical retirement for Vettel, and a virtual safety car and safety car period meant that Ferrari were caught out and could only salvage a podium finish with Leclerc.

At the Japanese Grand Prix, the Ferraris locked out the front row, with Vettel setting a track record pole time. The start of the race went badly for Ferrari as Vettel lost out to Valtteri Bottas at the start and Leclerc collided with Max Verstappen in turn 1. Leclerc was instructed to stay out despite a clearly damaged front wing, showering bits and pieces onto the cars behind. Finally, the race director Michael Masi instructed Ferrari to call Leclerc into the pits to repair the front wing. In the end, Leclerc finished a lap down in eighth place, promoted to sixth following the disqualification of the Renault's, while Vettel withstood a challenge from a charging Lewis Hamilton to hold on to second.

=== Closing rounds ===
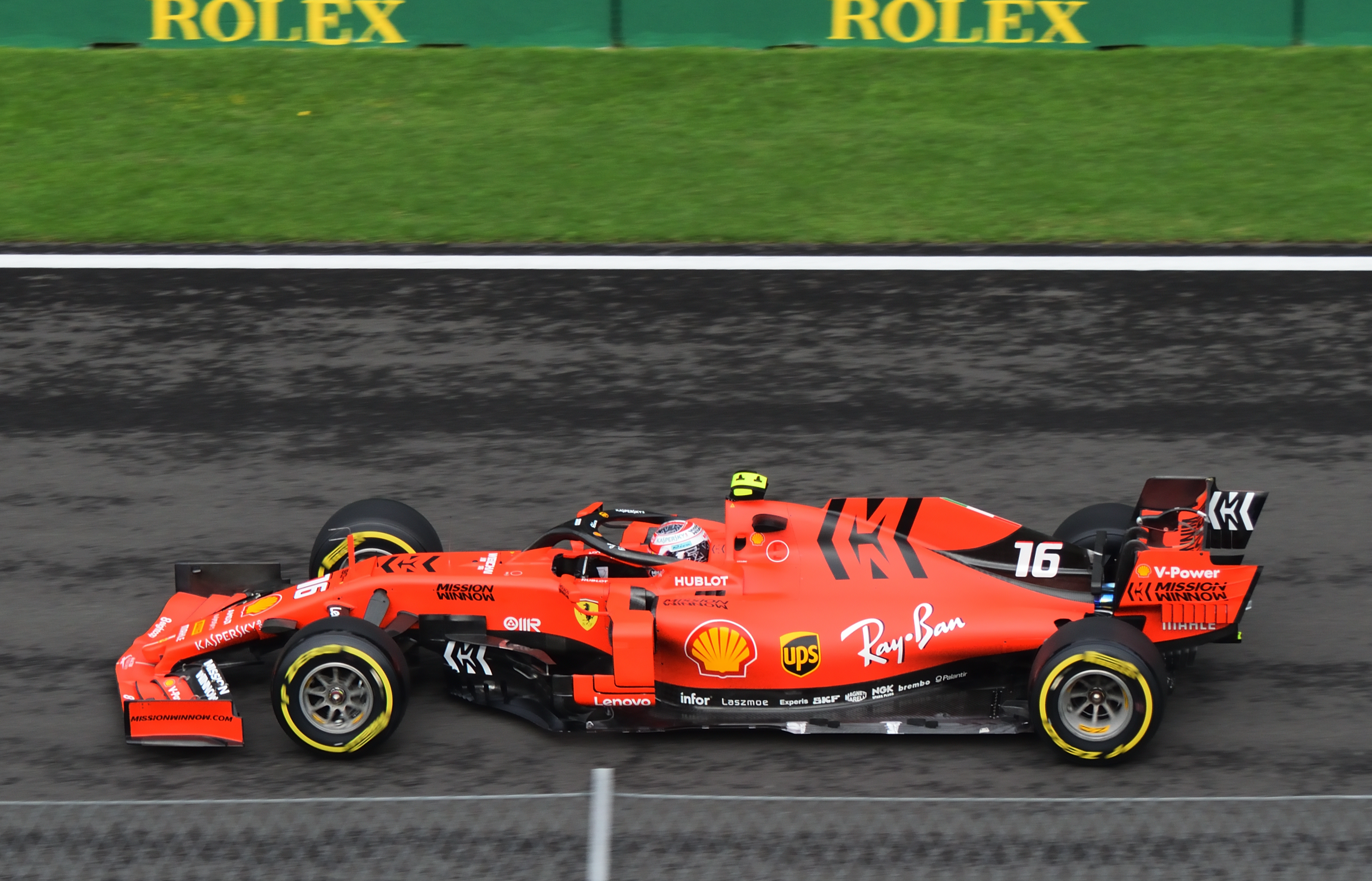
Leclerc practicing for the Mexican Grand Prix

At the Mexican Grand Prix, the Ferraris appeared once again the team to beat, with Leclerc taking pole position ahead of his teammate after Max Verstappen received a penalty for ignoring yellow flags. An alternate strategy from Mercedes and Ferrari's lack of race pace saw the two drivers finish fourth and second for Leclerc and Vettel, respectively. At the United States Grand Prix, Ferrari looked to have a decent chance at the race victory, with Vettel lining up on the front row and Leclerc lining up fourth. The team suffered a poor start, with Vettel dropping five places on the first lap as he struggled to warm his tyres. On lap 9, Vettel retired due to a suspension failure. Leclerc salvaged fourth for the team, 50 seconds behind race winner Valtteri Bottas. Ferrari's poor performance once again created controversy around the legality of their engine.

At the Brazilian Grand Prix, Vettel qualified on the front row for the fourth consecutive time while Leclerc started 14th after a grid penalty. Vettel ran in third for most of the race, not really being a threat to the race leaders Lewis Hamilton and Verstappen. Meanwhile, Leclerc made his way through the field. After the safety car restart, Vettel lost third place to Alex Albon. On lap 65, Leclerc overtook Vettel into turn 1 for fourth position; a few corners later, Vettel was on the attack, got alongside his teammate, and they made contact, resulting in a suspension failure for Leclerc and a puncture for Vettel. As a result, both drivers retired after the collision. This was the first race since the 2017 Singapore Grand Prix that Ferrari scored no points. At the Abu Dhabi Grand Prix, Leclerc qualified fourth and Vettel fifth; both gained one grid position after Valtteri Bottas was handed a grid penalty. Leclerc took the final podium spot, while Vettel finished in fifth. After the race, the FIA investigated Leclerc's car for any illegalities. Although he was not disqualified, Ferrari were fined €50,000 for an inaccurate declaration of the car's fuel load.

== Power unit controversy ==
Ferrari enjoyed strong straight-line performance throughout the 2019 season, with their performance being particularly strong between the Belgian and Mexican Grands Prix in September and October, where they scored six consecutive pole positions and their only race wins of the season. As their form had noticeably improved when compared to their first 12 races of the season, Red Bull issued a query to the FIA asking for clarification if utilising a system that got around the fuel flow sensor would be allowed. The FIA responded before the United States Grand Prix, reminding all competitors through a technical directive that such systems would not be allowed. Subsequently, Ferrari's form faded as they failed to score a pole position or a race win in the remainder of the season. Mercedes-powered Lewis Hamilton claimed that Ferrari had lost power after the technical directives, while Honda-powered Max Verstappen accused Ferrari of cheating.

After the end of pre-season testing for the 2020 Formula One World Championship, the FIA announced that it had concluded an investigation of the 2019 Ferrari 064 power unit and formed a private settlement with Ferrari. All of the non-Ferrari-powered teams were "surprised and shocked" by the announcement, urging the FIA to give full disclosure of the legality of the 2019 Ferrari power unit. The FIA responded by saying that while it was not fully satisfied with its legality, it was decided to not take further action due to the complexity of the matter and to avoid complicated legal cases.

== Livery ==
The livery features a satin red finish with a black accents, drawing the inspiration of cars from 1983 to 1996. Ferrari used the 90th anniversary logos in most of the races and Mission Winnow logos in certain races vice versa due to tobacco advertising was outlawed. At the Monaco Grand Prix, the team paid tribute to Niki Lauda with his name presented on the sidepods. At the Chinese Grand Prix, the 1000th Grand Prix logo was presented on the sidepods.

== Later use ==
A modified SF90 was used during testing of the 2022 tyre compounds after the 2021 Abu Dhabi Grand Prix.

== Complete Formula One results ==
(key)

Year	Entrant	Engine	Tyres	Drivers	Grands Prix																					Points	WCC
Year	Entrant	Engine	Tyres	Drivers	AUS	BHR	CHN	AZE	ESP	MON	CAN	FRA	AUT	GBR	GER	HUN	BEL	ITA	SIN	RUS	JPN	MEX	USA	BRA	ABU	Points	WCC
2019	Scuderia Ferrari Mission Winnow	Ferrari 064	P	Sebastian Vettel	4	5	3	3	4	2	2^{P}	5^{F}	4	16	2	3	4^{F}	13	1	Ret	2^{P}	2	Ret	17^{†}	5	504	2nd
2019	Scuderia Ferrari Mission Winnow	Ferrari 064	P	Charles Leclerc	5	3^{P}^{F}	5	5^{F}	5	Ret	3	3	2^{P}	3	Ret	4	1^{P}	1^{P}	2^{P}	3^{P}	6	4^{P}^{F}	4^{F}	18^{†}	3	504	2nd

^{†} Driver failed to finish the race, but was classified as they had completed over 90% of the winner's race distance.

== See also ==
- List of Ferrari engines
