= 2019 Formula One World Championship =

Motor racing championship

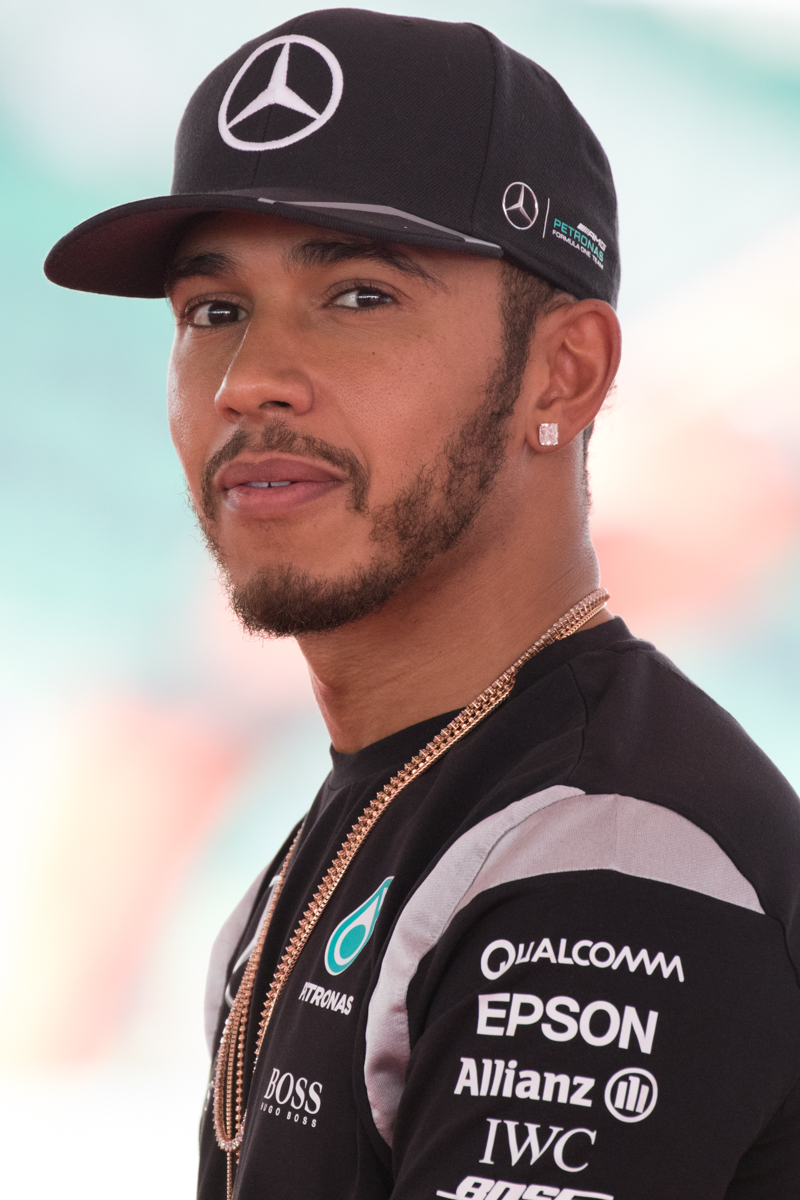
Lewis Hamilton (pictured in 2016) the defending champion won his sixth of seven Drivers' Championships, his third in a row.

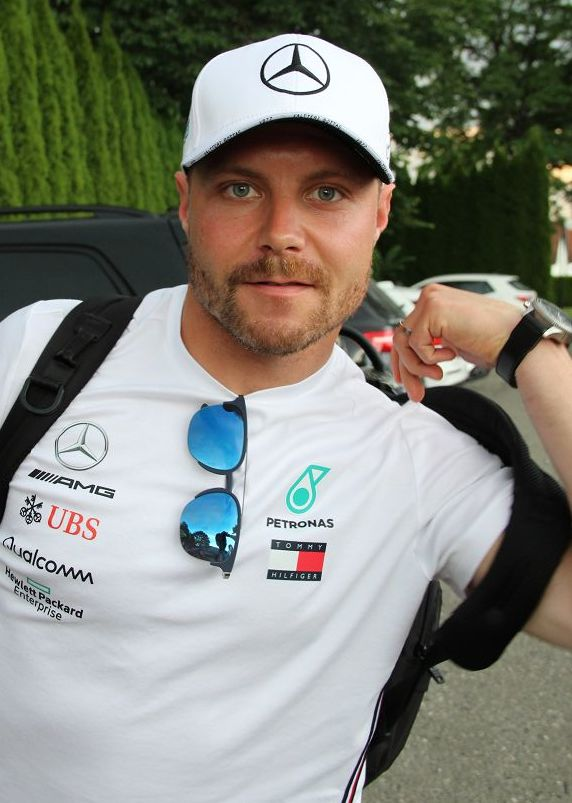
Hamilton's teammate Valtteri Bottas was runner-up, driving for Mercedes.

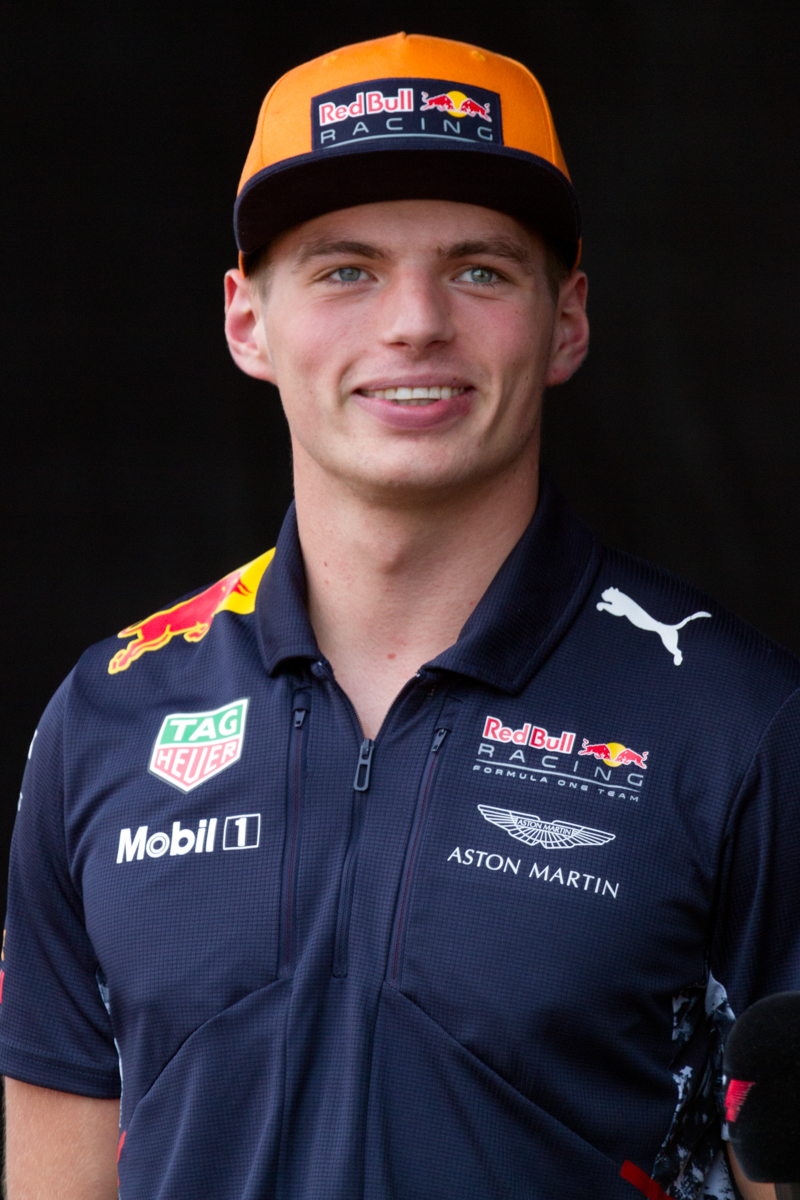
Max Verstappen (pictured in 2017) finished the season in third place, driving for Red Bull-Honda.

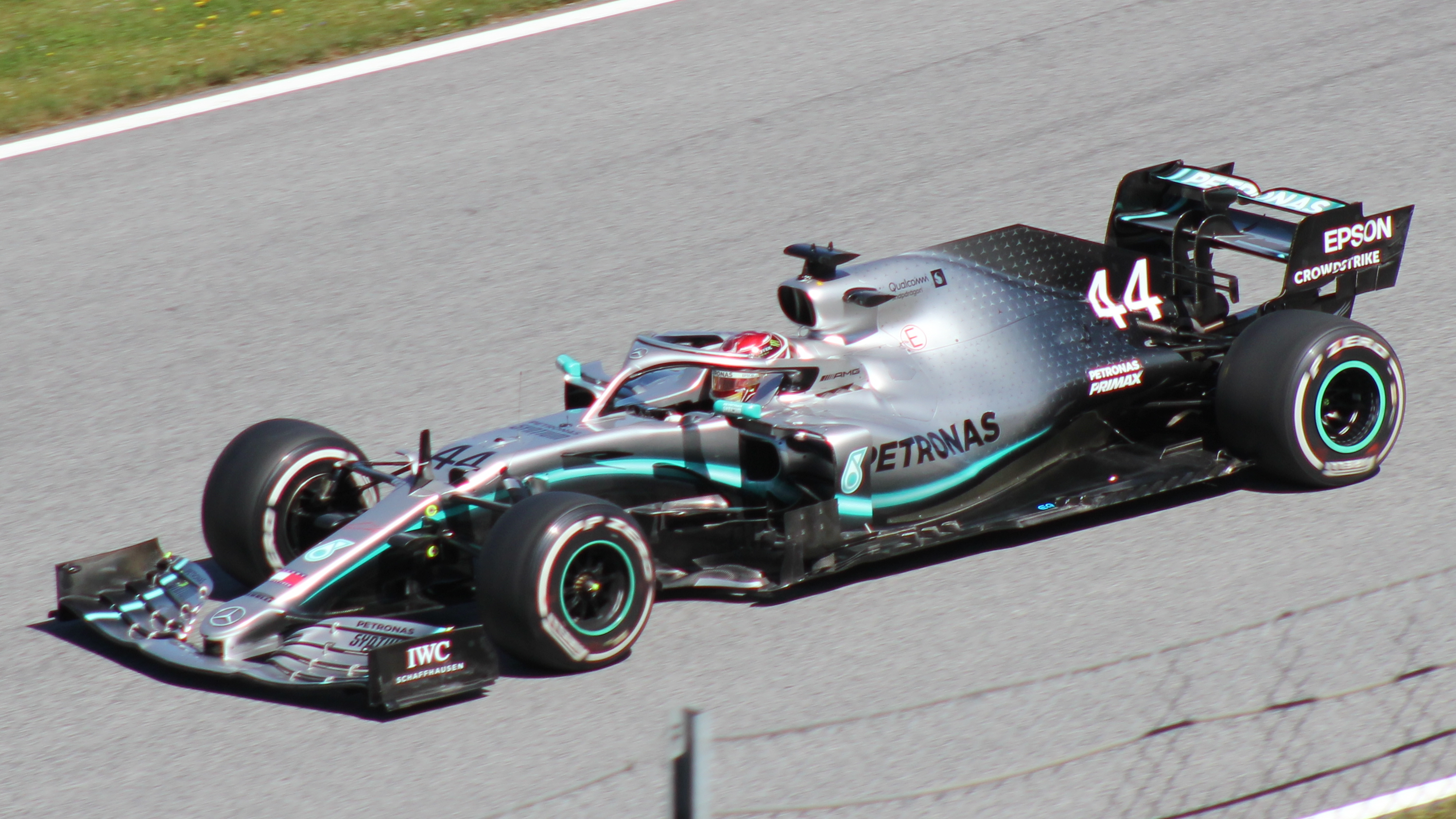
Mercedes retained the Constructors' Championship for a sixth consecutive year.

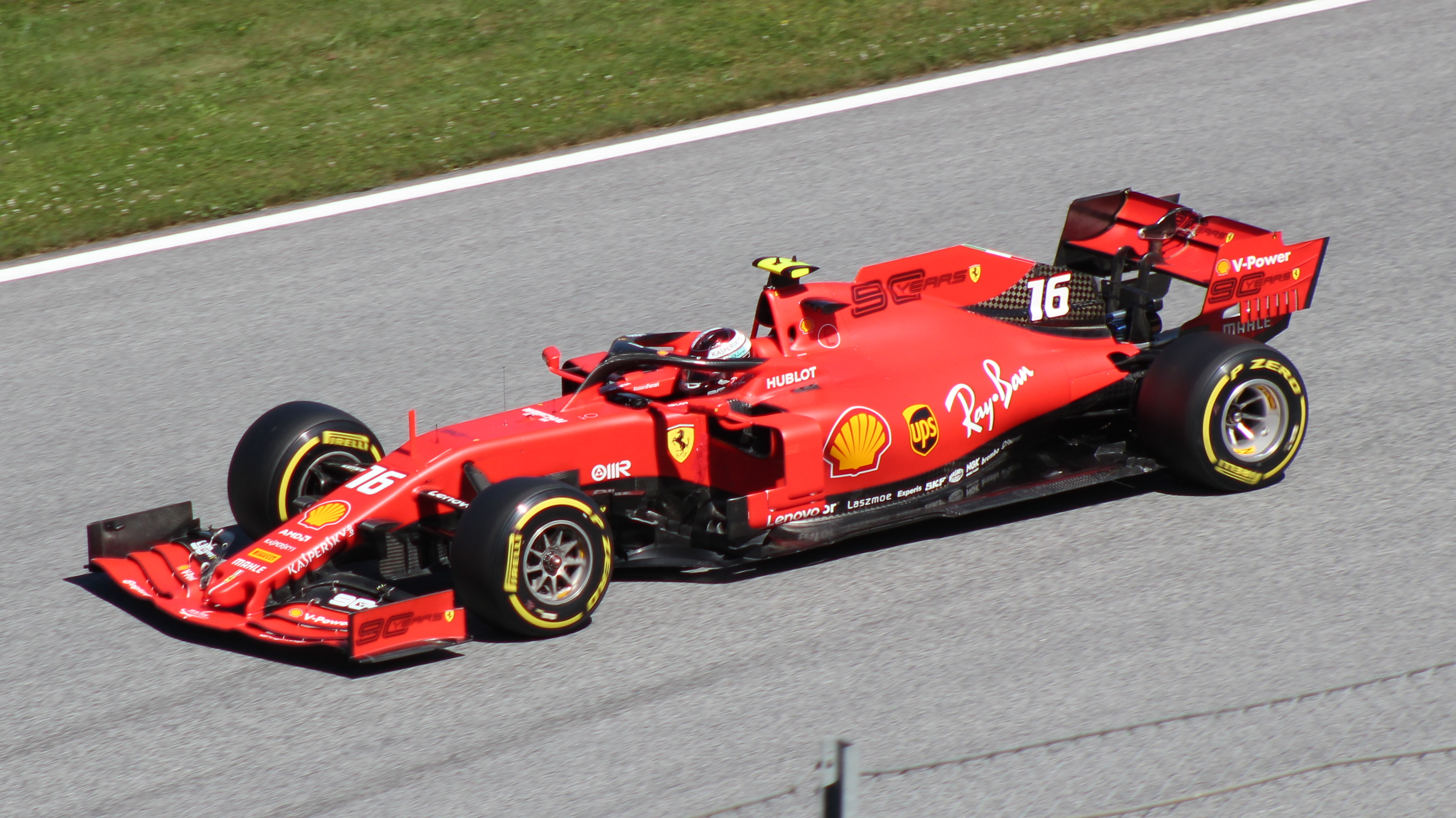
Ferrari finished second in the Constructors' Championship for the third consecutive year.

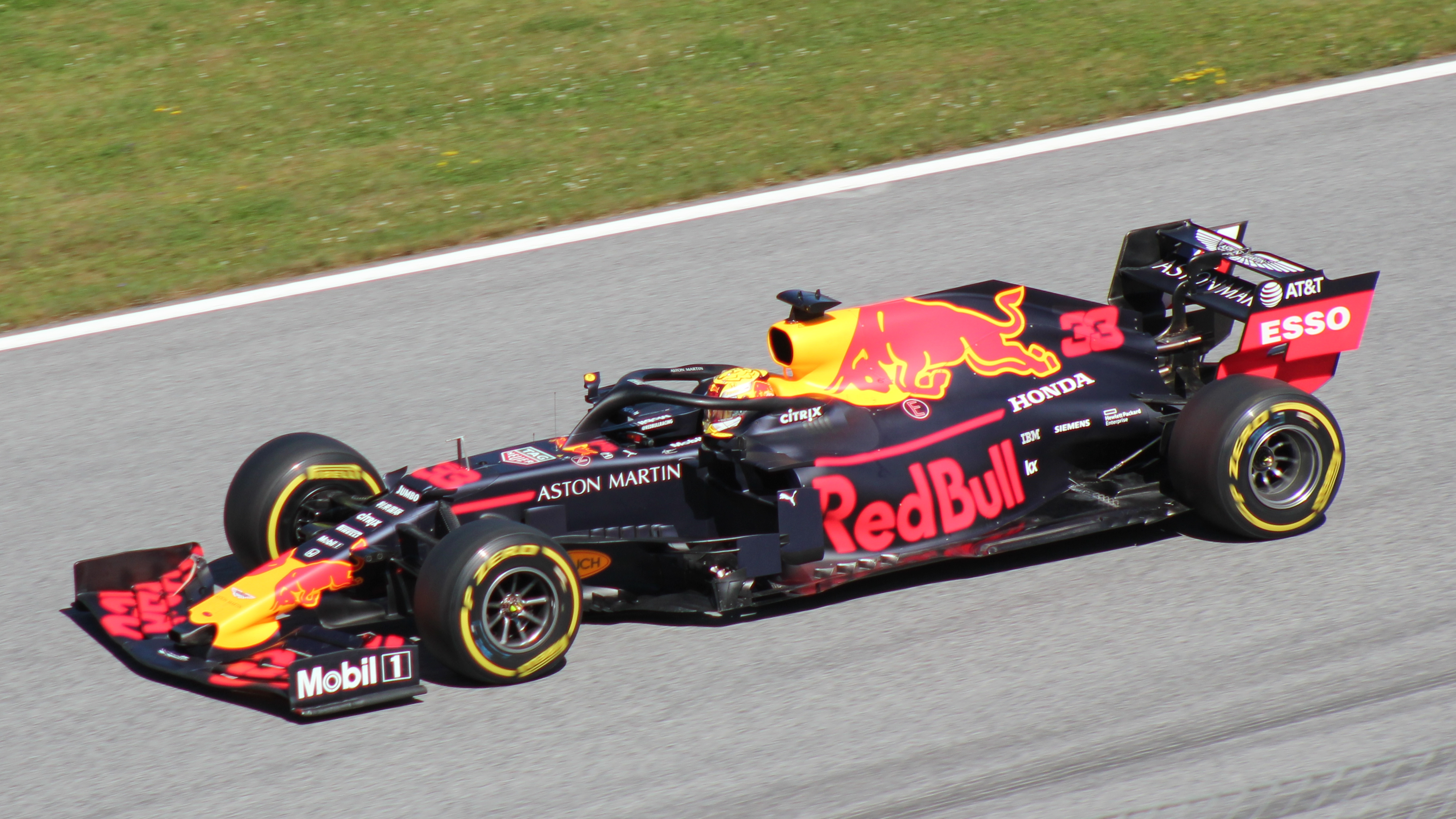
Red Bull Racing finished third in the Constructors' Championship for the third consecutive year.

The 2019 FIA Formula One World Championship was the motor racing championship for Formula One cars which marked the 70th running of the Formula One World Championship. It is recognised by the governing body of international motorsport, the Fédération Internationale de l'Automobile (FIA), as the highest class of competition for open-wheel racing cars. Starting in March and ending in December, the championship was contested over twenty-one Grands Prix. Drivers competed for the title of World Drivers' Champion, and teams for the title of World Constructors' Champion. The 2019 championship also saw the running of the 1000th World Championship race, the 2019 Chinese Grand Prix.

Lewis Hamilton successfully defended the World Drivers' Championship for the second year running, winning his sixth championship title at the United States Grand Prix. Mercedes successfully defended the World Constructors' Championship, securing the title for the sixth consecutive year at the Japanese Grand Prix to tie Ferrari's record from 1999 to 2004.

The season also saw the debuts of future world champion Lando Norris, future race winner George Russell, and Alexander Albon.

== Entries ==
Ten teams, with two drivers each, competed in the championship in 2019. All teams competed with tyres supplied by Pirelli.

Teams and drivers competing in the 2019 World Championship
Entrant	Constructor	Chassis	Power unit	Race drivers		
Entrant	Constructor	Chassis	Power unit	No.	Driver name	Rounds
(Switzerland) Alfa Romeo Racing	Alfa Romeo Racing-Ferrari	C38	Ferrari 064	7; 99	(Finland) Kimi Räikkönen (Italy) Antonio Giovinazzi	All; All
(Italy) Scuderia Ferrari (Note: Ferrari entered rounds 1, 7–16 as "Scuderia Ferrari", and rounds 2–6, 17–21 as "Scuderia Ferrari Mission Winnow".)	Ferrari	SF90	Ferrari 064	5; 16	(Germany) Sebastian Vettel (Monaco) Charles Leclerc	All; All
(United States) Haas F1 Team (Note: Haas entered rounds 1–14 as "Rich Energy Haas F1 Team".)	Haas-Ferrari	VF-19	Ferrari 064	8; 20	(France) Romain Grosjean (Denmark) Kevin Magnussen	All; All
(United Kingdom) McLaren F1 Team	McLaren-Renault	MCL34	Renault E-Tech 19	4; 55	(United Kingdom) Lando Norris (Spain) Carlos Sainz Jr.	All; All
(Germany) Mercedes AMG Petronas Motorsport	Mercedes	F1 W10 EQ Power+	Mercedes M10 EQ Power+	44; 77	(United Kingdom) Lewis Hamilton (Finland) Valtteri Bottas	All; All
(United Kingdom) SportPesa Racing Point F1 Team	Racing Point-BWT Mercedes	RP19	BWT Mercedes (Note: Racing Point F1 Team uses Mercedes M10 EQ Power+ power units. For sponsorship purposes, these engines were rebadged as "BWT Mercedes".)	11; 18	(Mexico) Sergio Pérez (Canada) Lance Stroll	All; All
(Austria) Aston Martin Red Bull Racing	Red Bull Racing-Honda	RB15	Honda RA619H	10; 23; 33	(France) Pierre Gasly (Thailand) Alexander Albon (Netherlands) Max Verstappen	1–12; 13–21; All
(France) Renault F1 Team	Renault	R.S.19	Renault E-Tech 19	3; 27	(Australia) Daniel Ricciardo (Germany) Nico Hülkenberg	All; All
(Italy) Red Bull Toro Rosso Honda	Scuderia Toro Rosso-Honda	STR14	Honda RA619H	23; 10; 26	(Thailand) Alexander Albon (France) Pierre Gasly (Russia) Daniil Kvyat	1–12; 13–21; All
(United Kingdom) ROKiT Williams Racing	Williams-Mercedes	FW42	Mercedes M10 EQ Power+	63; 88	(United Kingdom) George Russell (Poland) Robert Kubica	All; All

=== Free practice drivers ===
Across the season, two drivers drove as a test or third driver in free practice sessions. Nicholas Latifi drove for Williams at six Grands Prix, while Naoki Yamamoto drove for Toro Rosso at the Japanese Grand Prix.

Drivers that took part in a free practice session
Constructor	No.	Driver	Rounds
Scuderia Toro Rosso-Honda	38	(Japan) Naoki Yamamoto	17
Williams-Mercedes	40	(Canada) Nicholas Latifi	7–8, 13, 18–20

=== Team changes ===
Red Bull Racing ended its twelve-year partnership with Renault and switched to full-works Honda engines. In doing so, Red Bull Racing joined sister team Scuderia Toro Rosso in using Honda power after the latter joined the Japanese manufacturer in 2018. Neither team was recognised as Honda's official factory team under the terms of the agreement. This was the first time Honda had supplied more than one team in the sport since the 2008 when Honda supplied both its own full works team and the customer Super Aguri team.

Racing Point F1 Team completed their transition from the Racing Point Force India identity that they used after a consortium led by Lawrence Stroll purchased the assets of Sahara Force India in August 2018.

Sauber was renamed Alfa Romeo Racing in an extension of the sponsorship deal that began in 2018, though continued to operate from the same base in Hinwil and under the Swiss racing licence. The Sauber name disappeared entirely from the Formula One grid, but was still used in the Formula 2 and Formula 3 support categories with Charouz Racing System for one year. The Sauber name would return to the Formula One grid in 2024 as Kick Sauber after the expiration of the Alfa Romeo partnership.

Haas F1 Team signed a title sponsorship agreement with energy drinks manufacturer Rich Energy for 2019 before the end of the 2018 season. However, this agreement was later terminated on 9 September 2019, due to a series of off-track disputes between Haas and Rich Energy, and legal issues for Rich Energy.

=== Driver changes ===
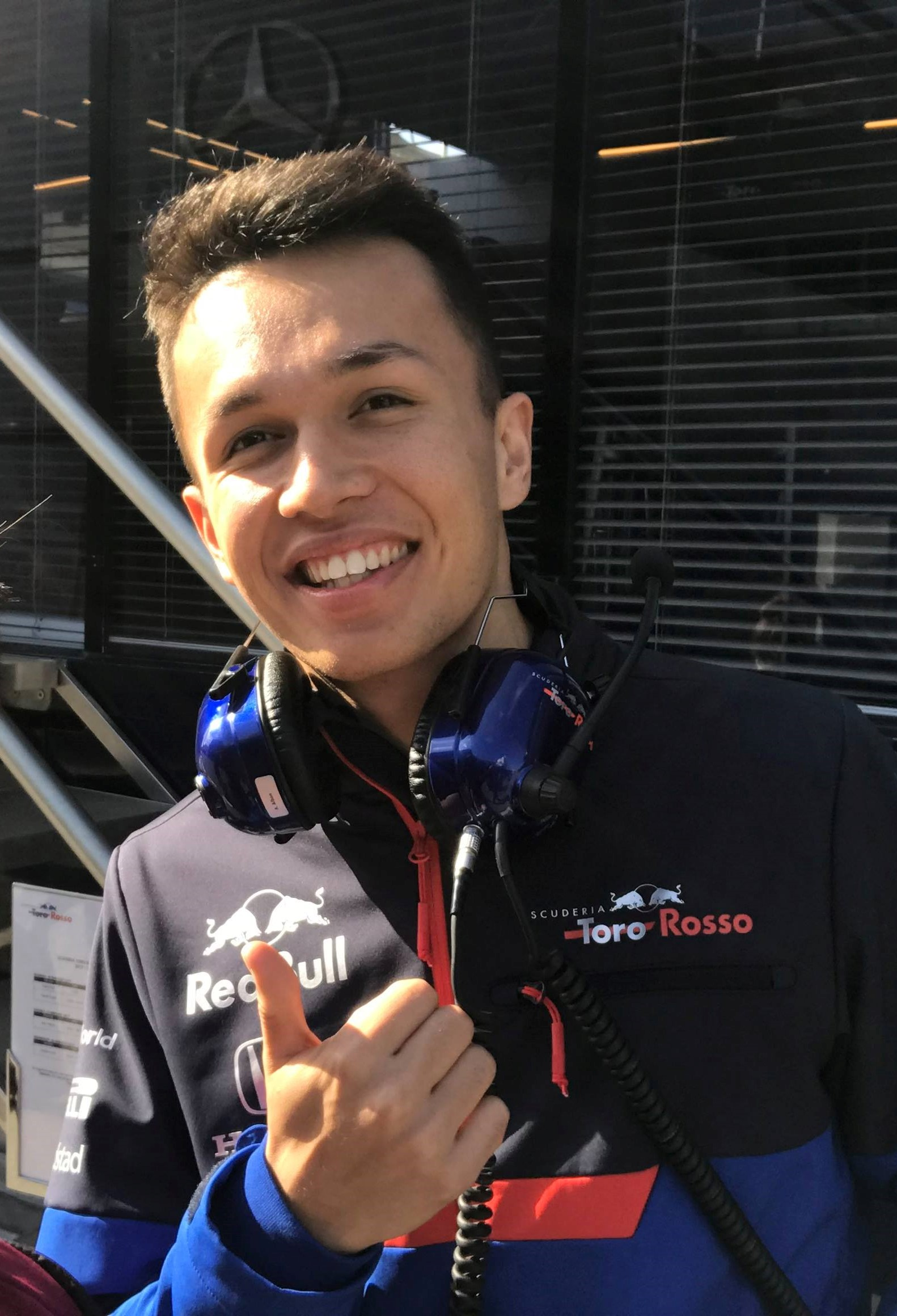
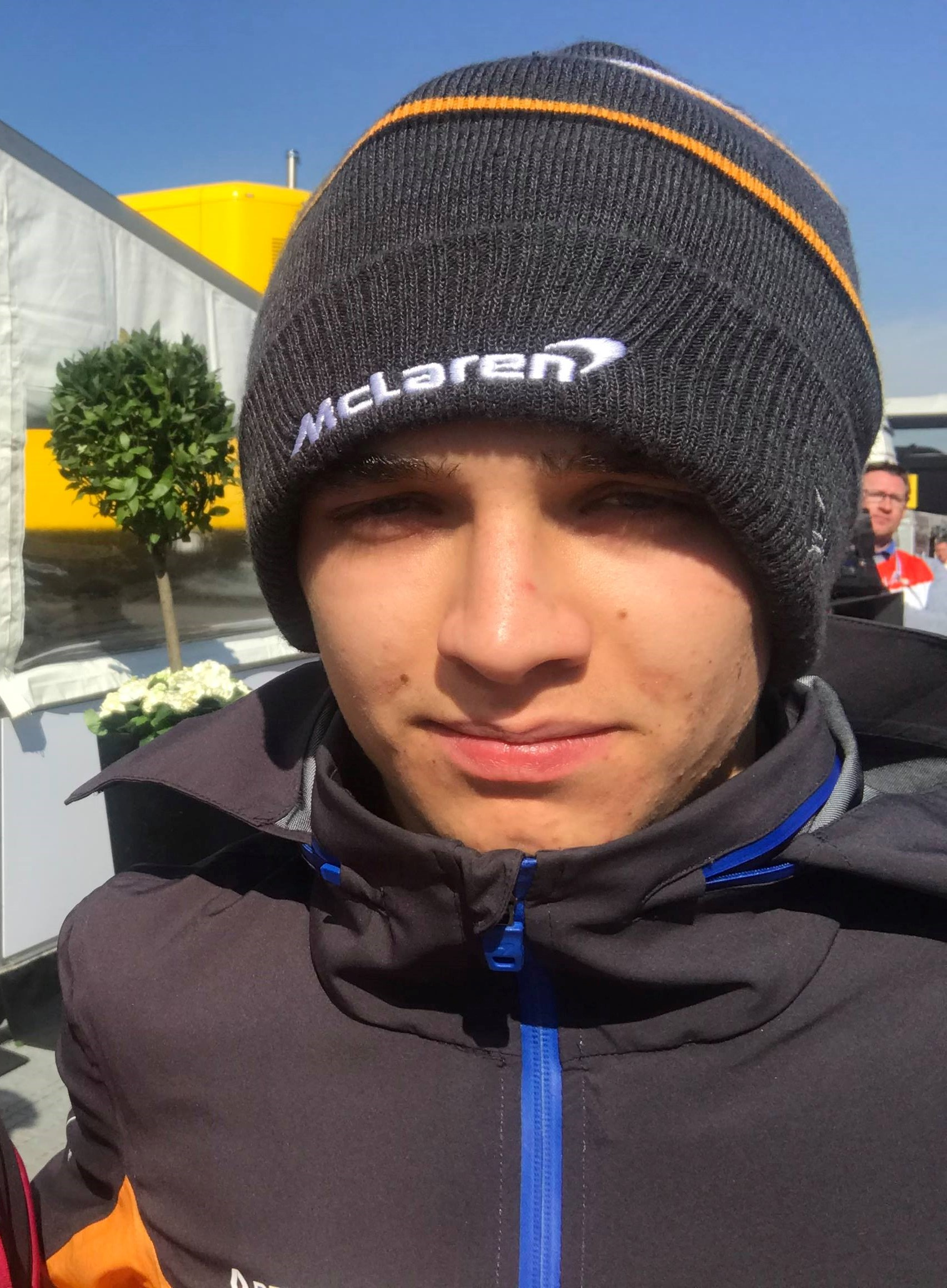
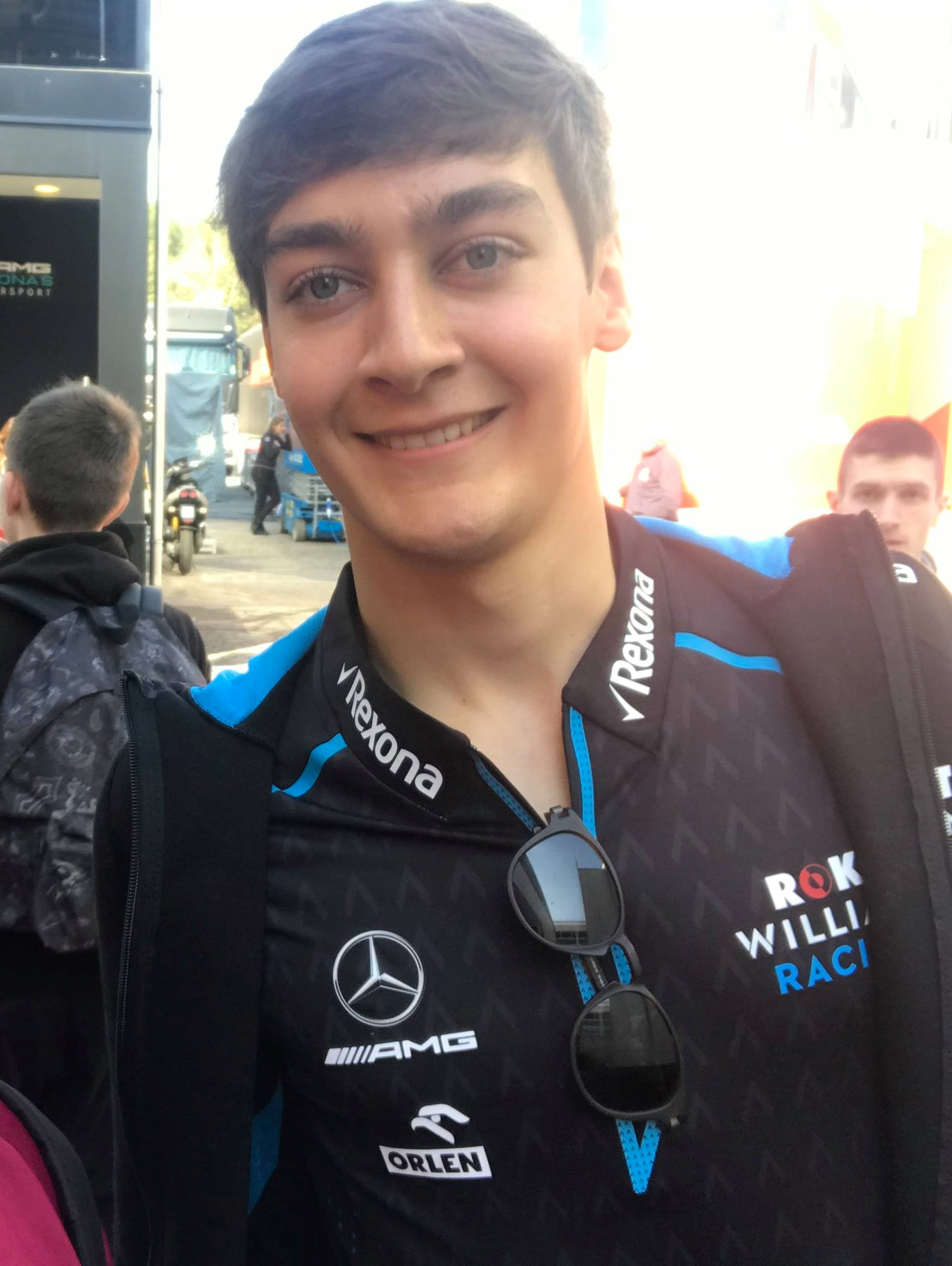
Alexander Albon (left), Lando Norris (centre) and George Russell (right) made their Formula One debuts with Toro Rosso, McLaren and Williams respectively.

The lead up to the 2019 championship saw several driver changes. Daniel Ricciardo moved to Renault after five years with Red Bull Racing, replacing Carlos Sainz Jr. Ricciardo's drive at Red Bull Racing was taken by Pierre Gasly, who was promoted from Scuderia Toro Rosso, the team with whom he made his first Formula One start in 2017. Daniil Kvyat rejoined Toro Rosso after last racing for the team in 2017. He was partnered with Formula 2 driver Alexander Albon, who replaced Brendon Hartley. Albon subsequently became only the second Thai driver to race in Formula One after Prince Bira.

Sainz, who was on loan to Renault in 2018, did not have his deal with Red Bull renewed and subsequently moved to McLaren to replace two-time World Drivers' Champion Fernando Alonso, who had earlier announced that he would retire from Formula One in 2019, albeit he returned to the sport in 2021. Sainz was partnered with 2017 European Formula 3 champion and Formula 2 runner-up Lando Norris, who replaced Stoffel Vandoorne, who would move to Formula E to race with the Mercedes-affiliated HWA Racelab, as well as join Mercedes as a reserve driver.

Charles Leclerc left Alfa Romeo Racing after one year with the team, replacing 2007 World Champion Kimi Räikkönen at Ferrari. Räikkönen returned to Alfa Romeo, previously named Sauber, with whom he had started his career in 2001. He was partnered with Antonio Giovinazzi, who made two starts for Sauber when he replaced the injured Pascal Wehrlein in 2017. Marcus Ericsson moved to race in the IndyCar Series in 2019 with Schmidt Peterson Motorsports but remained with Alfa Romeo as a third driver and brand ambassador.

Lance Stroll would join the Racing Point UK F1 team, replacing Esteban Ocon, who joined Mercedes as a reserve driver. Ocon shared the role of simulator driver with Stoffel Vandoorne. Reigning Formula 2 champion and Mercedes junior George Russell joined Williams replacing Stroll. Sergey Sirotkin would depart Williams due to his backer deciding to stop sponsoring Williams due to the lack of performance and development of the car. Sirotkin returned to Renault as a reserve driver. He would be replaced by Robert Kubica; Kubica's return comes after an eight-year absence brought on by a near-fatal rally car crash in 2011 that left him with serious arm injuries.

==== Mid-season changes ====
In the build-up to the Belgian Grand Prix, Red Bull Racing announced that Pierre Gasly would be demoted to Toro Rosso and Alexander Albon would be promoted in his place so that his performance would be evaluated in view of the team's 2020 line-up. The decision to demote Gasly was criticised as he had only completed twelve races with the team, while Albon and Toro Rosso team-mate Daniil Kvyat had both previously been released from contracts with the Red Bull Junior Team and Red Bull Racing respectively.

== Calendar ==
Nations that hosted a Grand Prix in 2019 are highlighted in green, with circuit locations marked with a black dot. Former host nations are shown in dark grey, and former host circuits are marked with a white dot.

The 2019 calendar features the same twenty-one Grands Prix as the previous season. Each race was run over a minimum number of laps that exceeds a total distance of 305 km (189.5 mi); the only exception to this is the Monaco Grand Prix, for which the distance is 260 km (161.6 mi).

Schedule of events
Round	Grand Prix	Circuit	Date
1	Australian Grand Prix	(Australia) Albert Park Circuit, Melbourne	17 March
2	Bahrain Grand Prix	Bahrain International Circuit, Sakhir	31 March
3	Chinese Grand Prix	(China) Shanghai International Circuit, Shanghai	14 April
4	Azerbaijan Grand Prix	(Azerbaijan) Baku City Circuit, Baku	28 April
5	Spanish Grand Prix	(Spain) Circuit de Barcelona-Catalunya, Montmeló	12 May
6	Monaco Grand Prix	Circuit de Monaco, Monte Carlo	26 May
7	Canadian Grand Prix	(Canada) Circuit Gilles Villeneuve, Montréal	9 June
8	French Grand Prix	(France) Circuit Paul Ricard, Le Castellet	23 June
9	Austrian Grand Prix	(Austria) Red Bull Ring, Spielberg	30 June
10	British Grand Prix	(United Kingdom) Silverstone Circuit, Silverstone	14 July
11	German Grand Prix	(Germany) Hockenheimring, Hockenheim	28 July
12	Hungarian Grand Prix	(Hungary) Hungaroring, Mogyoród	4 August
13	Belgian Grand Prix	(Belgium) Circuit de Spa-Francorchamps, Stavelot	1 September
14	Italian Grand Prix	(Italy) Autodromo Nazionale di Monza, Monza	8 September
15	Singapore Grand Prix	Marina Bay Street Circuit, Singapore	22 September
16	Russian Grand Prix	(Russia) Sochi Autodrom, Sochi	29 September
17	Japanese Grand Prix	(Japan) Suzuka International Racing Course, Suzuka	13 October
18	Mexican Grand Prix	Autódromo Hermanos Rodríguez, Mexico City	27 October
19	United States Grand Prix	(United States) Circuit of the Americas, Austin, Texas	3 November
20	Brazilian Grand Prix	(Brazil) Autódromo José Carlos Pace, São Paulo	17 November
21	Abu Dhabi Grand Prix	(United Arab Emirates) Yas Marina Circuit, Abu Dhabi	1 December

== Regulation changes ==
Race Director and Technical Delegate Charlie Whiting died days before the opening race of the season in Australia. Deputy Race Director Michael Masi was named as his successor for Race Director.

=== Technical regulations ===
In a bid to improve overtaking, teams agreed to a series of aerodynamic changes that affect the profile of the front and rear wings. The front wing endplates were reshaped to alter the airflow across the car and reduce the effects of aerodynamic turbulence and winglets above the main plane of the front wing have been banned. The slot in the rear wing was widened, making the drag reduction system (DRS) more powerful. The agreed-upon changes were drawn from the findings of a working group set up to investigate potential changes to the technical regulations in preparation for the 2021 championship. The front wing was made 200 mm (7.9 in) wider, 20 mm (0.79 in) higher, and moved 25 mm (0.98 in) further forward. The rear wing was made 100 mm (3.9 in) wider and 70 mm (2.8 in) higher, with a 20 mm (0.79 in) larger DRS opening.

Parts of the technical regulations governing bodywork were rewritten in a bid to promote sponsorship opportunities for teams. The agreed changes are to mandate smaller bargeboards and limit aerodynamic development of the rear wing endplates to create more space for sponsor logos. The changes were introduced as a response to falling revenues amid teams and the struggles of smaller teams to secure new sponsors.

The mandated maximum fuel levels were raised from 105 kg (231 lb) to 110 kg (240 lb) to minimise the need for drivers to conserve fuel during a race. Driver weights are no longer considered when measuring the minimum weight of the car. This change was agreed to following concerns that drivers were being forced to lose dangerous amounts of weight in order to offset the additional weight of the post-2014 turbo-hybrid engines. Drivers who weigh less than 80 kg (176 lb) are required to make up this weight with a ballast, located around the seat to minimise possible performance gains. The changes were introduced to eliminate the advantage drivers with a naturally smaller body shape had over taller and heavier drivers and to discourage unhealthy diet and exercise regimes to improve performance.

=== Sporting regulations ===
==== Reintroduction of fastest lap point ====
The regulations introduced a bonus point to the driver (and the constructor) that sets the fastest lap in a race. The point is only awarded if the driver is classified in the top ten at the end of the race. This makes 2019 the first time since 1959 that a bonus point gets awarded for setting the fastest lap.

==== Driver safety ====
The FIA introduced a new standard for driver helmets with the intention of improving safety. Under the new standard, helmets will be subjected to a more thorough range of crash tests aimed at improving energy absorption and deflection as well as reducing the likelihood of objects penetrating the helmet's structure. All certified helmet manufacturers were required to pass the tests in advance of the 2019 championship to have their certification renewed. Once introduced to Formula One, the new standard will gradually be applied to all helmets used by competitors in every FIA-sanctioned event.

==== Tyres ====
Tyre supplier Pirelli renamed its range of tyres following a request from the FIA and the sport's management. The governing body argued that the naming conventions used in 2018 were obtuse and difficult for casual spectators to understand. Under the new plan, names given to particular compounds, such as "hypersoft" and "ultrasoft", were replaced by referring during each race to the three compounds teams have available for that race as soft, medium and hard. This was intended to aid fans in understanding the tyre compounds used at each round. The actual compounds for the season were referred to by number, from the firmest ("1") to the softest ("5"). Seven compounds were available in 2018, although only six of the seven were used, the "superhard" not being used at all. Pirelli continued to decide which three compounds are made available for each race. The practice of using colours to identify the specific compound (such as pink for the hypersoft) was discontinued, with white, yellow and red being used for the three compounds available for each race where white denoted the hardest available compound and red the softest. As all five compounds were available in testing there were slight variations in the details on the tyre sidewalls to distinguish between the different compounds during testing.

== Season report ==
=== Opening rounds ===
The season started with the Australian Grand Prix, won by Valtteri Bottas from second on the grid in dominant fashion, finishing 20 seconds ahead of Mercedes teammate Lewis Hamilton who himself only narrowly beat Red Bull's Max Verstappen to second. Verstappen's third place marked the first podium for a Honda powered car in over 10 years, last achieved at the 2008 British Grand Prix.

The second race of the season was the Bahrain Grand Prix. Ferrari topped every practice session and then went on to lock out the front row in qualifying. Charles Leclerc earned the first pole position of his career by setting a lap time 3 tenths of a second quicker than his teammate Sebastian Vettel. In the race, Leclerc fell down to 3rd in the 1st corner behind Vettel and the championship leader Valtteri Bottas. However, he then climbed back up the order to take the lead despite being told by his team, Ferrari, not to overtake his teammate. Late in the race, Leclerc was leading by around 10 seconds before his engine developed an issue, allowing Lewis Hamilton to take the race lead. A few laps later, Valtteri Bottas also overtook Leclerc pushing him down to 3rd and making it a Mercedes 1–2. Just as it was looking like Max Verstappen was going to overtake Leclerc as well, a safety car was called out due to both of the Renault cars of Nico Hülkenberg and Daniel Ricciardo having engine and power issues at turns 1 and 3. The race finished behind the safety car for the eighth time in F1 history. As a result, Lewis Hamilton won, Valtteri Bottas came second, and Charles Leclerc came home third for his first podium and Ferrari's first podium of the season. After the race Valtteri Bottas led the Drivers' Championship by 1 point over teammate Lewis Hamilton.

At round three, the Chinese Grand Prix, Hamilton led away at the start and won the Grand Prix, resulting in him taking the championship lead by 6 points over his teammate Bottas, whilst Mercedes extended their lead over Ferrari, becoming the first team since Williams in 1992 to start a season with 3 consecutive 1–2 finishes. Pierre Gasly set the fastest lap and finished in sixth, after pitting with 3 laps remaining as Ferrari got their second podium of the season with Vettel.

At the next round, the Azerbaijan Grand Prix, it was a different story. In the first practice session, George Russell's Williams made contact with a drain cover down the straight on the floor after Charles Leclerc, who was fastest in the session because it was suspended, also made contact with the drain cover but with his left front tyre. The next two practice sessions were all about Leclerc, being fastest in all three practice sessions. In qualifying, Pierre Gasly was fastest in the first session but did not set a time in the second because it was irrelevant since he would start in the pitlane for not stopping for the weighbridge in one practice session. Charles Leclerc, the favourite for pole, timed 2nd in the first session and was 5th in the second session, but crashed at turn 8 in the same session, locking up his tyres and missing the apex, going into the barrier. This meant that Leclerc's qualifying was over, at least physically; he did make it into the final session but did not set a time as a result of the crash. Valtteri Bottas took pole ahead of championship leader Hamilton. Kimi Räikkönen originally qualified ninth, but started from the pitlane after his car failed a front wing deflection test and joined Red Bull driver Gasly in starting in the pitlane as his teammate, Antonio Giovinazzi, received a ten-place grid penalty for using a third control electronic in his power unit and started 17th. In the race, Lewis Hamilton did get the better start, but Bottas had better pace and stayed in the lead. Charles Leclerc, who started 8th, was 4th after losing two spots in the opening lap and was getting steady pace with leader Bottas on the fresh set of medium tyres he got as a result of his crash during qualifying. After Bottas, Hamilton, and Sebastian Vettel pitted for tyres, Charles Leclerc took the lead and led the race for a long time. Eventually, Bottas retook the lead from Leclerc who had not pitted yet at that time. A virtual safety car was deployed after an incident with Daniel Ricciardo and Daniil Kvyat at a runoff area. Bottas won the race by 1.5 seconds over teammate Hamilton and took a 1-point lead in the Drivers' Championship. Charles Leclerc took his 2nd fastest lap after pitting with less than 5 laps remaining as his teammate, Sebastian Vettel, took 3rd place for the team.

=== Middle of the season ===
At the Spanish Grand Prix, Valtteri Bottas dominated the entire qualifying session, finishing in first place each time, thus giving him his third consecutive pole of the 2019 season. Hamilton, however, got past him quickly at the first corner in the race. The safety car was deployed on lap 44 after a collision between Racing Point's Lance Stroll and McLaren's Lando Norris, which ultimately did not change the positions of the top 6 runners. Mercedes finished again for their fifth 1–2 finish as Hamilton took the chequered flag (along with the fastest lap point) and Bottas four seconds behind. Red Bull's Max Verstappen completed the podium.

At the Monaco Grand Prix, teams and drivers honoured the memory of F1 legend and Mercedes non-executive chairman Niki Lauda, who had died the week before the race. Mercedes painted their halos red and other teams and some drivers memorialised Lauda on their cars and helmets. Mercedes locked out the front row of the grid again, with Hamilton on pole and Bottas in second. During the race, Red Bull's Max Verstappen was released unsafely from his pit box and impeded Valtteri Bottas, resulting in a five-second time penalty for Verstappen. In the second half of the race, Hamilton was on the radio complaining about his graining tyres, but his team kept him out. Second-placed Verstappen kept the pressure on Hamilton, with Verstappen coming close to Hamilton in the final laps of the race at the Nouvelle Chicane. Hamilton went on to win the race and although Verstappen was second, his penalty was applied and it demoted him to fourth place. This promoted Ferrari's Sebastian Vettel to second and Mercedes's Bottas to third, ending Mercedes's 1–2 winning streak.

At the Canadian Grand Prix, free practice was eventful. Championship leader Lewis Hamilton made contact with the wall at turn 8, damaging his car, and some other drivers made contact not just there, but also at the Wall of Champions. Qualifying 2 was red-flagged after Kevin Magnussen slammed into the Wall of Champions, which also affected some racers trying to improve their times. At the end of qualifying, Ferrari's Sebastian Vettel won pole position ahead of Hamilton. Vettel led from the start until lap 48, when he lost control of his Ferrari and slid across the grass at turn 3, regaining control as he came back onto the circuit and nearly colliding with Hamilton. The stewards controversially gave Vettel a five-second time penalty for this incident as they deemed it an unsafe re-entry to the track and impeding Hamilton. Although Vettel crossed the finish line first, Hamilton was less than five seconds behind, so was promoted to first place after the penalty was applied. Vettel's teammate, Charles Leclerc finished in third place, and Mercedes's Valtteri Bottas received the fastest lap bonus point. Although Ferrari had intended to appeal the ruling, they withdrew but reviewed the evidence further. During free practice at the next race, the stewards announced that they would not review Ferrari's new evidence, thus the final standings stood with Hamilton in first and Vettel in second.

At the French Grand Prix, Mercedes dominated the free practice sessions. Hamilton was summoned to the stewards' office for rejoining the track unsafely, forcing Red Bull's Max Verstappen off the track, but no penalty was issued. Mercedes locked out the front row again in qualifying with Hamilton on pole and Bottas in second. Mercedes secured their sixth 1–2 of the season with Hamilton finishing 18 seconds ahead of Bottas, and Leclerc completing the podium less than a second behind Bottas. At the end of the final lap, fifth-placed finisher Vettel set the fastest lap for a bonus point.

At the Austrian Grand Prix, some drivers spun off the track in free practice due to wind. In qualifying, Leclerc secured his second pole position. Verstappen was promoted to second and Bottas third after second-placed Hamilton was given a grid penalty for impeding Kimi Räikkönen in Q1. In the race, Leclerc led away as Verstappen lost a few positions at the start. However, Verstappen found power for his car and managed to come back, passing Leclerc with just a few laps left. An investigation followed after contact was made between the two at turn 3 on lap 69, but the stewards deemed it a racing incident. All drivers finished the race, with Verstappen winning the race for a second consecutive year as well as setting the fastest lap. Leclerc finished second and Bottas finished third. It was the first win for a Honda-powered F1 car since Jenson Button in the 2006 Hungarian Grand Prix, and the first non-Mercedes win in 2019.

At the British Grand Prix, the newly resurfaced track surface caused plenty of eventful moments throughout the weekend, with Romain Grosjean crashing his car on the pit exit and Kimi Räikkönen's Alfa Romeo stopping on the Wellington straight, the latter of which brought out a red flag. The drivers all struggled with track grip levels throughout the session, and although there was some brief rain, it had little impact on the running in the session. Championship leader Lewis Hamilton was chasing for a 6th consecutive pole position at Silverstone but Bottas pipped him to pole by 0.006 seconds, almost as close as the 0.002-second time gap by which Vettel beat Fernando Alonso in the 2010 German Grand Prix. The opening laps did provide for some battling between the two Mercedes drivers, but the safety car played a crucial role in the Mercedes battle when Giovinazzi became stuck in the gravel trap at the penultimate corner and Hamilton pitted under the safety car, whereas Bottas had already pitted a few laps earlier during open racing. Thereafter, Vettel and Verstappen were battling for 3rd when Vettel misjudged his braking point at Vale corner and rammed into the back of Verstappen, resulting in a 10-second penalty, which led Vettel to finish behind the two Williamses. It also promoted Pierre Gasly to a joint career-best finish of 4th. Leclerc took 3rd, Bottas took 2nd, and Lewis Hamilton won his 6th British Grand Prix, equalling the record for the most home grand prix wins with Alain Prost. Hamilton also set the fastest lap on the final lap with the hardest tyre, which he ran for most of the race.

At the German Grand Prix, Mercedes ran a special one-off livery to commemorate their 125th anniversary in motorsport. Ferrari looked set to be the favourites for pole, having been fastest in every practice session, but both hit technical difficulties during qualifying, leaving Hamilton to take pole. Vettel started the race from last place. Everything changed in the race as it rained heavily before the start, leading the race to have a standing start for the first time. As the race progressed, many drivers spun off or crashed, particularly at the final two turns of the track, where Nico Hülkenberg and Charles Leclerc ended their races. Hülkenberg was on course to take his first ever podium before he crashed out. Hamilton also fell victim at the same place, but managed to keep going with a broken front wing. He was later penalized for entering the pit lane outside the bollard, later having a spin, and ended up 11th. Max Verstappen went on to claim victory in the race, with Vettel recovering from last to second, and the third podium place went to Toro Rosso's Daniil Kvyat, who made a stop for slick tyres late in the race to claim his third career podium and Toro Rosso's first since the 2008 Italian Grand Prix, after a close battle with Racing Point's Lance Stroll. Post-race, both Alfa Romeos, which finished 7th and 8th, were penalized for technical infringements, promoting Hamilton and Williams's Robert Kubica into the points, the latter scoring Williams's first – and what turned out to be only – points of the season, as well as his first since the 2010 Abu Dhabi Grand Prix.

Verstappen took his maiden pole at the Hungarian Grand Prix, equalling the record with Sir Jackie Stewart for taking the most victories before a maiden pole. An unexpected extra stop for Hamilton soon led him to winning the race and beating Verstappen in the closing laps, who was suffering from graining tyres late in the race, having been battling with Hamilton previously.

The two tracks immediately after the summer break were more suited to Ferrari's top speed advantage, with Leclerc winning both the Belgian and Italian Grands Prix from pole position. In both races, Leclerc was under strong pressure from Hamilton throughout, winning the Belgian race by less than a second, before Hamilton ultimately dropped back after missing the first chicane in Italy. This enabled Bottas to finish second and slightly close up in the title race. Leclerc won his first two career wins consecutively and within the timespan of one week, as Vettel and Verstappen endured two terrible weekends. His victory at Belgium was an emotional one, as the race was overshadowed by the death of Formula 2 driver Anthoine Hubert the previous day. The Renault junior driver was involved in an accident on lap 2 of the Feature Race, succumbing to his injuries later that evening. This saw Leclerc close up in the battle for third in the Drivers' Championship. Leclerc also became the first Ferrari Monza winner since Fernando Alonso's victory in 2010. Qualifying sessions for both races were unusual in that Leclerc won pole by a sizeable margin of more than 0.7 seconds on a dry track in Belgium, whereas almost the entire Q3 field missed crossing the line in time for their second timed lap at Monza, as no driver wanted to be at the front of the group as they would not have the advantage of a tow from the car in front – a significant benefit at Monza, the season's fastest track.

=== Closing rounds ===
Vettel ended a winless streak stretching over a year to win at the Singapore Grand Prix for Ferrari, the team's third consecutive victory. Leclerc had qualified on pole ahead of Hamilton and Vettel and led the first stint. However, a timely pitstop by Vettel saw him unintentionally undercutting Leclerc with an outlap three seconds faster than Leclerc's inlap. Hamilton then tried an overcut that did not work, limiting him to a fourth-place finish, as Mercedes were off the podium with both cars. Hamilton initially kept a reasonable pace, before his tyres fell off and the midfield cars behind him started to run faster laptimes than him. After his pitstop, he was unable to pass Verstappen, who finished third. There were three safety car spells in the second half of the race, although the complexion of the Singapore circuit made the restarts uneventful up front as the top cars ran in formation. This marked the first time in eleven years that Ferrari had won three races in a row and was Vettel's record fifth win at Singapore, and also the first time a team has finished 1–2 in Singapore. The race results saw Leclerc move ahead of Verstappen and climb to third in the standings for the first time of the season.

Leclerc took his fourth consecutive pole at the Russian Grand Prix, but at the start of the race, it was Vettel who led, contradicting a pre-race agreement that had been discussed. Vettel led until he made his first stop on lap 26, but an engine component failed just after his stop, prompting his retirement (the four-time World Champion even demanding the return of V12 engines as in the 1990s on the team radio as he ground to a halt). This prompted a Virtual Safety Car, during which both Mercedes as well as Leclerc pitted, therefore resulting in a 1–2 finish for Mercedes with Hamilton winning. Leclerc could only finish third behind the Mercedeses.

At the Japanese Grand Prix, free practice sessions 1 and 2 went as scheduled on Friday, with Mercedes topping each of the sessions. Because of Typhoon Hagibis, all events for Saturday, with the exception of qualifying, were cancelled with qualifying instead being rescheduled to Sunday morning. Vettel and Leclerc both locked out the front row for a Ferrari 1–2, with Bottas and Mercedes not far behind. The Red Bull drivers of Verstappen and Albon finished with the exact same Q3 time, but Verstappen received the position ahead of his teammate as he was released first. At the race, Vettel had an issue when the lights went out to start the race, letting Bottas pass by easily. Leclerc and Verstappen had a tangle at turn 2 on the opening lap, which saw Leclerc being given a five-second penalty; he was later given a ten-second penalty for driving in an unsafe condition after the collision. Verstappen eventually retired from the race, his second DNF of the season. The chequered flag was waved a lap early, and though Sergio Pérez of Racing Point crashed out, his 9th place standing was left intact as the results of the race were taken from lap 52. Bottas of Mercedes finished first, Vettel of Ferrari finished second, and Hamilton finished third with Hamilton receiving the fastest lap point. With the 1–3 finish for Mercedes, the team had secured their sixth consecutive Constructors' Championship. Renault had both drivers disqualified for a technical infringement following a protest from Racing Point.

At the Mexican Grand Prix, Leclerc took his seventh pole position of the season, ensuring that he would end 2019 with the most poles of any driver. Hamilton won his tenth Grand Prix of the season, after a first-corner touch with Verstappen that saw them both crossing the grass at turn 2. Verstappen lost several positions, and in fighting his way back past Bottas sustained a puncture that effectively ended his challenge. Sebastian Vettel finished second and Valtteri Bottas third. Although Hamilton could have taken the World Championship, he was unable to outscore Bottas by a sufficient number of points.

At the United States Grand Prix, Bottas won from pole followed by Hamilton and Verstappen. Second place in the race was enough for Hamilton to claim his sixth World Drivers' Championship making him the second most successful Formula One driver in terms of Championship wins behind Michael Schumacher.

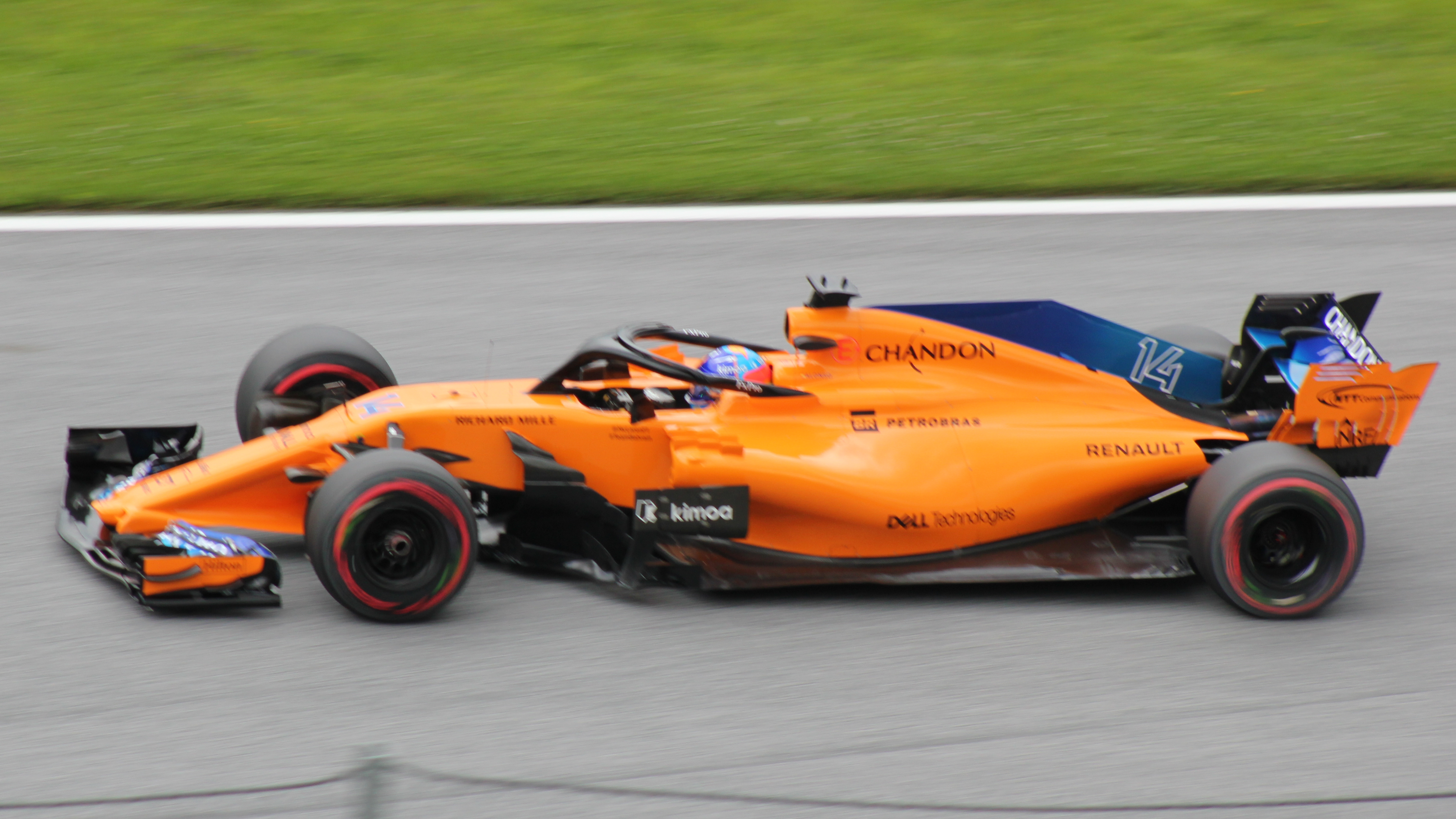
Fernando Alonso, pictured driving for McLaren, left Formula One after the 2018 season to race in various other championships. He would later rejoin the sport in 2021 with Alpine.

At the Brazilian Grand Prix, Verstappen won from pole. Pierre Gasly and Carlos Sainz Jr. took their first podiums, finishing 2nd and 3rd respectively. The race changed dramatically on lap 53 when Valtteri Bottas retired with an engine problem, bringing out the safety car to bunch up the field. Immediately after the end of the safety-car period, Ferrari teammates Charles Leclerc and Sebastian Vettel collided on the back straight, causing both to retire. Debris from the incident brought out the safety car again, returning to the pits with two laps remaining. Following the restart, Lewis Hamilton misjudged an overtaking manoeuvre on Alexander Albon, putting the latter into a spin and dropping him from a podium position to being out of the points. Hamilton's car was damaged but he was able to continue, although he lost second place to Pierre Gasly. Gasly and Hamilton were involved in a dramatic flat-out race to the finish line, with DRS being unavailable as this was only the second lap following the safety car ending. Gasly held onto second place, with his ability to keep Hamilton's Mercedes at bay in a straight fight being a major show of strength for the Honda engine. Hamilton occupied the final step of the podium, but was later given a 5-second time penalty for causing the incident with Albon. This dropped him to 7th and promoted Carlos Sainz Jr. to his first podium in Formula One in his 101st race – the longest any podium winner has had to wait for his first podium in F1 history.

Hamilton took pole position at the Abu Dhabi Grand Prix, ending his pole-less streak since Germany, and went on to dominate and win the race, taking the sixth Grand Slam of his career. Verstappen was initially overtaken by Leclerc at the start but despite having minor engine issues, managed to repass him later on. Leclerc had been summoned to the stewards regarding a fuel issue, and Ferrari were fined €50,000 while Leclerc got to keep his position. Bottas, who started from 20th and last due to multiple engine penalties, was able to recover to 4th place, despite a DRS issue affecting the entire grid for the first 17 laps of the race.

== Results and standings ==
=== Grands Prix ===
Round	Grand Prix	Pole position	Fastest lap	Winning driver	Winning constructor	Report
1	(Australia) Australian Grand Prix	(United Kingdom) Lewis Hamilton	(Finland) Valtteri Bottas	(Finland) Valtteri Bottas	(Germany) Mercedes	Report
2	Bahrain Grand Prix	(Monaco) Charles Leclerc	(Monaco) Charles Leclerc	(United Kingdom) Lewis Hamilton	(Germany) Mercedes	Report
3	(China) Chinese Grand Prix	(Finland) Valtteri Bottas	(France) Pierre Gasly	(United Kingdom) Lewis Hamilton	(Germany) Mercedes	Report
4	Azerbaijan Grand Prix	(Finland) Valtteri Bottas	(Monaco) Charles Leclerc	(Finland) Valtteri Bottas	(Germany) Mercedes	Report
5	(Spain) Spanish Grand Prix	(Finland) Valtteri Bottas	(United Kingdom) Lewis Hamilton	(United Kingdom) Lewis Hamilton	(Germany) Mercedes	Report
6	Monaco Grand Prix	(United Kingdom) Lewis Hamilton	(France) Pierre Gasly	(United Kingdom) Lewis Hamilton	(Germany) Mercedes	Report
7	(Canada) Canadian Grand Prix	(Germany) Sebastian Vettel	(Finland) Valtteri Bottas	(United Kingdom) Lewis Hamilton	(Germany) Mercedes	Report
8	(France) French Grand Prix	(United Kingdom) Lewis Hamilton	(Germany) Sebastian Vettel	(United Kingdom) Lewis Hamilton	(Germany) Mercedes	Report
9	(Austria) Austrian Grand Prix	(Monaco) Charles Leclerc	(Netherlands) Max Verstappen	(Netherlands) Max Verstappen	(Austria) Red Bull Racing-Honda	Report
10	(United Kingdom) British Grand Prix	(Finland) Valtteri Bottas	(United Kingdom) Lewis Hamilton	(United Kingdom) Lewis Hamilton	(Germany) Mercedes	Report
11	(Germany) German Grand Prix	(United Kingdom) Lewis Hamilton	(Netherlands) Max Verstappen	(Netherlands) Max Verstappen	(Austria) Red Bull Racing-Honda	Report
12	(Hungary) Hungarian Grand Prix	(Netherlands) Max Verstappen	(Netherlands) Max Verstappen	(United Kingdom) Lewis Hamilton	(Germany) Mercedes	Report
13	(Belgium) Belgian Grand Prix	(Monaco) Charles Leclerc	(Germany) Sebastian Vettel	(Monaco) Charles Leclerc	(Italy) Ferrari	Report
14	(Italy) Italian Grand Prix	(Monaco) Charles Leclerc	(United Kingdom) Lewis Hamilton	(Monaco) Charles Leclerc	(Italy) Ferrari	Report
15	Singapore Grand Prix	(Monaco) Charles Leclerc	(Denmark) Kevin Magnussen	(Germany) Sebastian Vettel	(Italy) Ferrari	Report
16	(Russia) Russian Grand Prix	(Monaco) Charles Leclerc	(United Kingdom) Lewis Hamilton	(United Kingdom) Lewis Hamilton	(Germany) Mercedes	Report
17	(Japan) Japanese Grand Prix	(Germany) Sebastian Vettel	(United Kingdom) Lewis Hamilton	(Finland) Valtteri Bottas	(Germany) Mercedes	Report
18	(Mexico) Mexican Grand Prix	(Monaco) Charles Leclerc (Note: Max Verstappen set the fastest time in qualifying, but received a three-place grid penalty for failing to slow for a yellow flag. Charles Leclerc was promoted to pole position in his place.)	(Monaco) Charles Leclerc	(United Kingdom) Lewis Hamilton	(Germany) Mercedes	Report
19	United States Grand Prix	(Finland) Valtteri Bottas	(Monaco) Charles Leclerc	(Finland) Valtteri Bottas	(Germany) Mercedes	Report
20	(Brazil) Brazilian Grand Prix	(Netherlands) Max Verstappen	(Finland) Valtteri Bottas	(Netherlands) Max Verstappen	(Austria) Red Bull Racing-Honda	Report
21	(United Arab Emirates) Abu Dhabi Grand Prix	(United Kingdom) Lewis Hamilton	(United Kingdom) Lewis Hamilton	(United Kingdom) Lewis Hamilton	(Germany) Mercedes	Report

=== Scoring system ===
Points were awarded to the top ten classified drivers and the driver who set the fastest lap. The points were awarded for every race, using the following system:

Position	1st	2nd	3rd	4th	5th	6th	7th	8th	9th	10th	FL
Points	25	18	15	12	10	8	6	4	2	1	1

The point for fastest lap was only awarded if the driver was classified in the top ten for the race. Two fastest lap points were not awarded this season as Kevin Magnussen and Valtteri Bottas set the fastest lap but did not classify within the top ten in Singapore and Brazil, respectively. As Daniil Kvyat and Nico Hülkenberg ended the season with an identical number of points, a count-back system was used as a tie-breaker, with the driver's best result used to decide the standings.

=== World Drivers' Championship standings ===
Pos.	Driver	AUS (Australia)	BHR (Bahrain)	CHN (China)	AZE (Azerbaijan)	ESP (Spain)	MON (Monaco)	CAN (Canada)	FRA (France)	AUT (Austria)	GBR (United Kingdom)	GER (Germany)	HUN (Hungary)	BEL (Belgium)	ITA (Italy)	SIN (Singapore)	RUS (Russia)	JPN (Japan)	MEX (Mexico)	USA (United States)	BRA (Brazil)	ABU (United Arab Emirates)	Points
1	(United Kingdom) Lewis Hamilton	2^{P}	1	1	2	1^{F}	1^{P}	1	1^{P}	5	1^{F}	9^{P}	1	2	3^{F}	4	1^{F}	3^{F}	1	2	7	1^{P}^{F}	413
2	(Finland) Valtteri Bottas	1^{F}	2	2^{P}	1^{P}	2^{P}	3	4^{F}	2	3	2^{P}	Ret	8	3	2	5	2	1	3	1^{P}	Ret^{F}	4	326
3	(Netherlands) Max Verstappen	3	4	4	4	3	4	5	4	1^{F}	5	1^{F}	2^{P}^{F}	Ret	8	3	4	Ret	6	3	1^{P}	2	278
4	(Monaco) Charles Leclerc	5	3^{P}^{F}	5	5^{F}	5	Ret	3	3	2^{P}	3	Ret	4	1^{P}	1^{P}	2^{P}	3^{P}	6	4^{P}^{F}	4^{F}	18†	3	264
5	(Germany) Sebastian Vettel	4	5	3	3	4	2	2^{P}	5^{F}	4	16	2	3	4^{F}	13	1	Ret	2^{P}	2	Ret	17†	5	240
6	(Spain) Carlos Sainz Jr.	Ret	19†	14	7	8	6	11	6	8	6	5	5	Ret	Ret	12	6	5	13	8	3	10	96
7	(France) Pierre Gasly	11	8	6^{F}	Ret	6	5^{F}	8	10	7	4	14†	6	9	11	8	14	7	9	16†	2	18	95
8	(Thailand) Alexander Albon	14	9	10	11	11	8	Ret	15	15	12	6	10	5	6	6	5	4	5	5	14	6	92
9	(Australia) Daniel Ricciardo	Ret	18†	7	Ret	12	9	6	11	12	7	Ret	14	14	4	14	Ret	DSQ	8	6	6	11	54
10	(Mexico) Sergio Pérez	13	10	8	6	15	12	12	12	11	17	Ret	11	6	7	Ret	7	8	7	10	9	7	52
11	(United Kingdom) Lando Norris	12	6	18†	8	Ret	11	Ret	9	6	11	Ret	9	11†	10	7	8	11	Ret	7	8	8	49
12	(Finland) Kimi Räikkönen	8	7	9	10	14	17	15	7	9	8	12	7	16	15	Ret	13	12	Ret	11	4	13	43
13	(Russia) Daniil Kvyat	10	12	Ret	Ret	9	7	10	14	17	9	3	15	7	Ret	15	12	10	11	12	10	9	37
14	(Germany) Nico Hülkenberg	7	17†	Ret	14	13	13	7	8	13	10	Ret	12	8	5	9	10	DSQ	10	9	15	12	37
15	(Canada) Lance Stroll	9	14	12	9	Ret	16	9	13	14	13	4	17	10	12	13	11	9	12	13	19†	Ret	21
16	(Denmark) Kevin Magnussen	6	13	13	13	7	14	17	17	19	Ret	8	13	12	Ret	17^{F}	9	15	15	18†	11	14	20
17	(Italy) Antonio Giovinazzi	15	11	15	12	16	19	13	16	10	Ret	13	18	18†	9	10	15	14	14	14	5	16	14
18	(France) Romain Grosjean	Ret	Ret	11	Ret	10	10	14	Ret	16	Ret	7	Ret	13	16	11	Ret	13	17	15	13	15	8
19	(Poland) Robert Kubica	17	16	17	16	18	18	18	18	20	15	10	19	17	17	16	Ret	17	18	Ret	16	19	1
20	(United Kingdom) George Russell	16	15	16	15	17	15	16	19	18	14	11	16	15	14	Ret	Ret	16	16	17	12	17	0
Pos.	Driver	AUS (Australia)	BHR (Bahrain)	CHN (China)	AZE (Azerbaijan)	ESP (Spain)	MON (Monaco)	CAN (Canada)	FRA (France)	AUT (Austria)	GBR (United Kingdom)	GER (Germany)	HUN (Hungary)	BEL (Belgium)	ITA (Italy)	SIN (Singapore)	RUS (Russia)	JPN (Japan)	MEX (Mexico)	USA (United States)	BRA (Brazil)	ABU (United Arab Emirates)	Points

Key
Colour	Result
Gold	Winner
Silver	Second place
Bronze	Third place
Green	Other points position
Blue	Other classified position
Blue	Not classified, finished (NC)
Purple	Not classified, retired (Ret)
Red	Did not qualify (DNQ)
Black	Disqualified (DSQ)
White	Did not start (DNS)
White	Race cancelled (C)
Blank	Did not practice (DNP)
Blank	Excluded (EX)
Blank	Did not arrive (DNA)
Blank	Withdrawn (WD)
Blank	Did not enter (empty cell)
Annotation	Meaning
P	Pole position
F	Fastest lap

Notes:

- † – Driver did not finish the Grand Prix, but was classified as he completed more than 90% of the race distance.

=== World Constructors' Championship standings ===
Pos.	Constructor	AUS (Australia)	BHR (Bahrain)	CHN (China)	AZE (Azerbaijan)	ESP (Spain)	MON (Monaco)	CAN (Canada)	FRA (France)	AUT (Austria)	GBR (United Kingdom)	GER (Germany)	HUN (Hungary)	BEL (Belgium)	ITA (Italy)	SIN (Singapore)	RUS (Russia)	JPN (Japan)	MEX (Mexico)	USA (United States)	BRA (Brazil)	ABU (United Arab Emirates)	Points
1	(Germany) Mercedes	1^{F}	1	1	1^{P}	1^{F}	1^{P}	1	1^{P}	3	1^{F}	9^{P}	1	2	2	4	1^{F}	1	1	1^{P}	7	1^{P}^{F}	739
1	(Germany) Mercedes	2^{P}	2	2^{P}	2	2^{P}	3	4^{F}	2	5	2^{P}	Ret	8	3	3^{F}	5	2	3^{F}	3	2	Ret^{F}	4	739
2	(Italy) Ferrari	4	3^{P}^{F}	3	3	4	2	2^{P}	3	2^{P}	3	2	3	1^{P}	1^{P}	1	3^{P}	2^{P}	2	4^{F}	17†	3	504
2	(Italy) Ferrari	5	5	5	5^{F}	5	Ret	3	5^{F}	4	16	Ret	4	4^{F}	13	2^{P}	Ret	6	4^{P}^{F}	Ret	18†	5	504
3	(Austria) Red Bull Racing-Honda	3	4	4	4	3	4	5	4	1^{F}	4	1^{F}	2^{P}^{F}	5	6	3	4	4	5	3	1^{P}	2	417
3	(Austria) Red Bull Racing-Honda	11	8	6^{F}	Ret	6	5^{F}	8	10	7	5	14†	6	Ret	8	6	5	Ret	6	5	14	6	417
4	(United Kingdom) McLaren-Renault	12	6	14	7	8	6	11	6	6	6	5	5	11†	10	7	6	5	13	7	3	8	145
4	(United Kingdom) McLaren-Renault	Ret	19†	18†	8	Ret	11	Ret	9	8	11	Ret	9	Ret	Ret	12	8	11	Ret	8	8	10	145
5	(France) Renault	7	17†	7	14	12	9	6	8	12	7	Ret	12	8	4	9	10	DSQ	8	6	6	11	91
5	(France) Renault	Ret	18†	Ret	Ret	13	13	7	11	13	10	Ret	14	14	5	14	Ret	DSQ	10	9	15	12	91
6	(Italy) Scuderia Toro Rosso-Honda	10	9	10	11	9	7	10	14	15	9	3	10	7	11	8	12	7	9	12	2	9	85
6	(Italy) Scuderia Toro Rosso-Honda	14	12	Ret	Ret	11	8	Ret	15	17	12	6	15	9	Ret	15	14	10	11	16†	10	18	85
7	(United Kingdom) Racing Point-BWT Mercedes	9	10	8	6	15	12	9	12	11	13	4	11	6	7	13	7	8	7	10	9	7	73
7	(United Kingdom) Racing Point-BWT Mercedes	13	14	12	9	Ret	16	12	13	14	17	Ret	17	10	12	Ret	11	9	12	13	19†	Ret	73
8	(Switzerland) Alfa Romeo Racing-Ferrari	8	7	9	10	14	17	13	7	9	8	12	7	16	9	10	13	12	14	11	4	13	57
8	(Switzerland) Alfa Romeo Racing-Ferrari	15	11	15	12	16	19	15	16	10	Ret	13	18	18†	15	Ret	15	14	Ret	14	5	16	57
9	(United States) Haas-Ferrari	6	13	11	13	7	10	14	17	16	Ret	7	13	12	16	11	9	13	15	15	11	14	28
9	(United States) Haas-Ferrari	Ret	Ret	13	Ret	10	14	17	Ret	19	Ret	8	Ret	13	Ret	17^{F}	Ret	15	17	18†	13	15	28
10	(United Kingdom) Williams-Mercedes	16	15	16	15	17	15	16	18	18	14	10	16	15	14	16	Ret	16	16	17	12	17	1
10	(United Kingdom) Williams-Mercedes	17	16	17	16	18	18	18	19	20	15	11	19	17	17	Ret	Ret	17	18	Ret	16	19	1
Pos.	Constructor	AUS (Australia)	BHR (Bahrain)	CHN (China)	AZE (Azerbaijan)	ESP (Spain)	MON (Monaco)	CAN (Canada)	FRA (France)	AUT (Austria)	GBR (United Kingdom)	GER (Germany)	HUN (Hungary)	BEL (Belgium)	ITA (Italy)	SIN (Singapore)	RUS (Russia)	JPN (Japan)	MEX (Mexico)	USA (United States)	BRA (Brazil)	ABU (United Arab Emirates)	Points

Key
Colour	Result
Gold	Winner
Silver	Second place
Bronze	Third place
Green	Other points position
Blue	Other classified position
Blue	Not classified, finished (NC)
Purple	Not classified, retired (Ret)
Red	Did not qualify (DNQ)
Black	Disqualified (DSQ)
White	Did not start (DNS)
White	Race cancelled (C)
Blank	Did not practice (DNP)
Blank	Excluded (EX)
Blank	Did not arrive (DNA)
Blank	Withdrawn (WD)
Blank	Did not enter (empty cell)
Annotation	Meaning
P	Pole position
F	Fastest lap

Notes:

- † – Driver did not finish the Grand Prix, but was classified as he completed more than 90% of the race distance.
- The standings are sorted by best result, rows are not related to the drivers. In case of tie on points, the best positions achieved determined the outcome.
