= 2019 United States Grand Prix =

Formula 1 race

Race 19 of 21 in the 2019 Formula One World Championship
| ← Previous race | Next race → |
- Layout of the Circuit of the Americas

Race details
- Date: November 3, 2019
- Official name: Formula 1 Emirates United States Grand Prix 2019
- Location: Circuit of the Americas, Austin, Texas, United States
- Course: Permanent racing facility
- Course length: 5.513 km (3.426 miles)
- Distance: 56 laps, 308.405 km (191.634 miles)
- Weather: Sunny
- Attendance: 268,000

Pole position
| Driver | (Finland) Valtteri Bottas | Mercedes |
- Time: 1:32.029

Fastest lap
| Driver | (Monaco) Charles Leclerc | Ferrari |
- Time: 1:36.169 on lap 44 (lap record)

Podium
| First | (Finland) Valtteri Bottas | Mercedes |
| Second | (United Kingdom) Lewis Hamilton | Mercedes |
| Third | (Netherlands) Max Verstappen | Red Bull Racing-Honda |

The 2019 United States Grand Prix (officially known as the Formula 1 Emirates United States Grand Prix 2019) was a Formula One motor race held on November 3, 2019, at the Circuit of the Americas in Austin, Texas, United States. The race was the 19th round of the 2019 Formula One World Championship and marked the 49th running of the United States Grand Prix, the 41st time that the race was run as a World Championship event since the inaugural 1950 season, and the 8th time that a World Championship round was held at the Circuit of the Americas in Austin, Texas.

Valtteri Bottas won the race from pole, Lewis Hamilton finished second with Max Verstappen third. In finishing second, Hamilton secured his sixth world championship.

== Background ==
=== Championship standings before the race ===
Heading into the race, Mercedes had already secured their sixth consecutive Constructors title. But the Drivers Championship was still undecided with Lewis Hamilton leading the World Championship by 74 points over teammate Valtteri Bottas. Hamilton would win the title if Bottas failed to outscore him by 22 points. This meant that if Bottas failed to win or if Hamilton finished in the top eight (or top nine with the fastest lap) Hamilton would win his sixth title and his third consecutively.

=== Entrants ===
The drivers and teams were the same as the season entry list with no additional stand-in drivers for the race. However, Nicholas Latifi drove in the first practice session for Williams, replacing George Russell. This also marked the 100th race start for Red Bull Racing driver Max Verstappen.

== Practice ==
At the end of the second practice session Sergio Pérez failed to stop when instructed at the weigh bridge and he was therefore required to start the race from the pit lane.

== Qualifying ==
=== Qualifying classification ===
| Pos. | No. | Driver | Constructor | Qualifying times | | | Final grid |
| Pos. | No. | Driver | Constructor | Q1 | Q2 | Q3 | Final grid |
|---|---|---|---|---|---|---|---|
| 1 | 77 | (Finland) Valtteri Bottas | Mercedes | 1:33.750 | 1:33.160 | 1:32.029 | 1 |
| 2 | 5 | (Germany) Sebastian Vettel | Ferrari | 1:33.766 | 1:32.782 | 1:32.041 | 2 |
| 3 | 33 | (Netherlands) Max Verstappen | Red Bull Racing-Honda | 1:33.549 | 1:33.120 | 1:32.096 | 3 |
| 4 | 16 | (Monaco) Charles Leclerc | Ferrari | 1:33.988 | 1:32.760 | 1:32.137 | 4 |
| 5 | 44 | (United Kingdom) Lewis Hamilton | Mercedes | 1:33.454 | 1:33.045 | 1:32.321 | 5 |
| 6 | 23 | (Thailand) Alexander Albon | Red Bull Racing-Honda | 1:33.984 | 1:32.898 | 1:32.548 | 6 |
| 7 | 55 | (Spain) Carlos Sainz Jr. | McLaren-Renault | 1:33.916 | 1:33.422 | 1:32.847 | 7 |
| 8 | 4 | (United Kingdom) Lando Norris | McLaren-Renault | 1:33.353 | 1:33.316 | 1:33.175 | 8 |
| 9 | 3 | (Australia) Daniel Ricciardo | Renault | 1:33.835 | 1:33.608 | 1:33.488 | 9 |
| 10 | 10 | (France) Pierre Gasly | Scuderia Toro Rosso-Honda | 1:33.556 | 1:33.715 | 1:33.601 | 10 |
| 11 | 27 | (Germany) Nico Hülkenberg | Renault | 1:34.092 | 1:33.815 | N/A | 11 |
| 12 | 20 | (Denmark) Kevin Magnussen | Haas-Ferrari | 1:33.812 | 1:33.979 | N/A | 12 |
| 13 | 26 | (Russia) Daniil Kvyat | Scuderia Toro Rosso-Honda | 1:34.138 | 1:33.989 | N/A | 13 |
| 14 | 18 | (Canada) Lance Stroll | Racing Point-BWT Mercedes | 1:33.921 | 1:34.100 | N/A | 14 |
| 15 | 8 | (France) Romain Grosjean | Haas-Ferrari | 1:34.161 | 1:34.158 | N/A | 15 |
| 16 | 99 | (Italy) Antonio Giovinazzi | Alfa Romeo Racing-Ferrari | 1:34.226 | N/A | N/A | 16 |
| 17 | 7 | (Finland) Kimi Räikkönen | Alfa Romeo Racing-Ferrari | 1:34.369 | N/A | N/A | 17 |
| 18 | 63 | (United Kingdom) George Russell | Williams-Mercedes | 1:35.372 | N/A | N/A | 18 |
| 19 | 11 | (Mexico) Sergio Pérez | Racing Point-BWT Mercedes | 1:35.808 | N/A | N/A | PL^{1} |
| 20 | 88 | (Poland) Robert Kubica | Williams-Mercedes | 1:35.889 | N/A | N/A | 19 |
107% time: 1:39.887

Notes

- ^1 – Sergio Pérez was required to start the race from the pit lane after failing to stop at the weigh bridge at the end of the second practice session.

== Race ==
On the opening lap Valtteri Bottas maintained his lead going into the first corner and Charles Leclerc lost 4th place to Lewis Hamilton at turn 1. Alexander Albon and Carlos Sainz Jr. collided entering the pits for repairs at the end of the first lap. The collision was later deemed a racing incident by the stewards and neither driver was reprimanded. Sebastian Vettel immediately encountered problems complaining of severe understeer despite avoiding contact with other drivers. By the start of the second lap Vettel had dropped to 7th place losing positions to Max Verstappen, Hamilton, Leclerc, Lando Norris and Daniel Ricciardo.

On lap 8, Vettel, still in 7th place, ran over a bumpy section of kerb on the exit of turn 9 causing his right-rear suspension to fail. He pulled over to the side of the track on the straight after turn 11 where his car was quickly removed by the marshals. Shortly afterwards Ricciardo passed Norris to claim 5th place. Verstappen was the first of the front-runners to make a scheduled pit stop at the end of lap 13 switching to hard-compound tyres. At this point in the race it was uncertain whether these tyres would last until the end or if Verstappen would require another stop. Bottas, who was still leading the race, came into the pits on the following lap for hard-compound tyres and maintained his position ahead of Verstappen upon exiting the pits.

The Ferrari of Leclerc, which was struggling for pace, was passed by both Bottas and Verstappen on lap 16 despite having yet to make a pit stop. Leclerc's problems were then exacerbated by a slow pit stop on lap 20. Hamilton, who was leading the race, was told by his team to pit on lap 23 to avoid holding up teammate, Bottas, who was close behind. Hamilton refused, claiming that his tyres were able to last longer and he was overtaken by Bottas for the lead before pitting at the end of the lap. This made the order of the top four Bottas, Verstappen, Hamilton and Leclerc after the first round of pit stops for the front-runners.

Robert Kubica was retired from the race on lap 32 after his Williams suffered an oil leak. The kerb on the exit of turn 9 continued to cause problems for other drivers after ending Vettel's race, with Sainz suffering bodywork damage on lap 34 after driving over it. Verstappen made a second stop on the same lap as his tyres began to wear out and the gap to Hamilton behind was narrowing. Mercedes responded to Verstappen on the following lap by bringing in Bottas, as they had done earlier in the race. Bottas maintained his position ahead of Verstappen but was now ten seconds behind race leader Hamilton.

Hamilton began to question his team's strategy, claiming over the radio that he was unsure if his tyres could make it to the end of the race. On lap 37 Albon cleared the midfield after his lap 1 incident by passing Ricciardo for 5th place. However Albon would later have to make a third pit stop, after which he re-passed Sergio Pérez, Pierre Gasly, Sainz, Norris and finally Ricciardo again on lap 48 to reclaim 5th place. Bottas and Verstappen began to close in on Hamilton with Bottas catching up to within one second with six laps to go. Bottas finally took the lead of the race on lap 52 after Hamilton had fought off previous attempts. Shortly afterwards Gasly and Pérez made contact as Pérez took 9th place. This resulted in suspension damage for Gasly who came into the pits, rejoined the track, but, returned to the pits a lap later to retire the car from the race.

Verstappen was now within three seconds of Hamilton but was catching him quickly. However, Verstappen's charge was halted when on the penultimate lap Kevin Magnussen, who was in 16th place, suffered a brake failure at turn 12 and spun into the gravel. This incident brought out yellow flags preventing overtaking into turn 12. Daniil Kvyat collided with Pérez on the final lap whilst attempting an overtake for 10th place breaking Pérez' front wing. Kvyat was handed a 5-second penalty after the race demoting him outside of the points to 12th place.

Bottas crossed the finish line to take his fourth victory of 2019 and the seventh win of his career. Hamilton held off Verstappen to take 2nd place and with it his sixth World Drivers' Championship, making him the outright second most accomplished Formula One driver of all time ahead of Juan Manuel Fangio and behind Michael Schumacher. This also marked Hamilton's 150th podium finish.

=== Race classification ===
| Pos. | No. | Driver | Constructor | Laps | Time/Retired | Grid | Points |
|---|---|---|---|---|---|---|---|
| 1 | 77 | (Finland) Valtteri Bottas | Mercedes | 56 | 1:33:55.653 | 1 | 25 |
| 2 | 44 | (United Kingdom) Lewis Hamilton | Mercedes | 56 | +4.148 | 5 | 18 |
| 3 | 33 | (Netherlands) Max Verstappen | Red Bull Racing-Honda | 56 | +5.002 | 3 | 15 |
| 4 | 16 | (Monaco) Charles Leclerc | Ferrari | 56 | +52.239 | 4 | 13^{1} |
| 5 | 23 | (Thailand) Alexander Albon | Red Bull Racing-Honda | 56 | +1:18.038 | 6 | 10 |
| 6 | 3 | (Australia) Daniel Ricciardo | Renault | 56 | +1:30.366 | 9 | 8 |
| 7 | 4 | (United Kingdom) Lando Norris | McLaren-Renault | 56 | +1:30.764 | 8 | 6 |
| 8 | 55 | (Spain) Carlos Sainz Jr. | McLaren-Renault | 55 | +1 lap | 7 | 4 |
| 9 | 27 | (Germany) Nico Hülkenberg | Renault | 55 | +1 lap | 11 | 2 |
| 10 | 11 | (Mexico) Sergio Pérez | Racing Point-BWT Mercedes | 55 | +1 lap | PL | 1 |
| 11 | 7 | (Finland) Kimi Räikkönen | Alfa Romeo Racing-Ferrari | 55 | +1 lap | 17 | |
| 12 | 26 | (Russia) Daniil Kvyat | Scuderia Toro Rosso-Honda | 55 | +1 lap^{2} | 13 | |
| 13 | 18 | (Canada) Lance Stroll | Racing Point-BWT Mercedes | 55 | +1 lap | 14 | |
| 14 | 99 | (Italy) Antonio Giovinazzi | Alfa Romeo Racing-Ferrari | 55 | +1 lap | 16 | |
| 15 | 8 | (France) Romain Grosjean | Haas-Ferrari | 55 | +1 lap | 15 | |
| 16^{3} | 10 | (France) Pierre Gasly | Scuderia Toro Rosso-Honda | 54 | Suspension | 10 | |
| 17 | 63 | (United Kingdom) George Russell | Williams-Mercedes | 54 | +2 laps | 18 | |
| 18^{3} | 20 | (Denmark) Kevin Magnussen | Haas-Ferrari | 52 | Brakes/Spun off | 12 | |
| Ret | 88 | (Poland) Robert Kubica | Williams-Mercedes | 31 | Oil leak | 19 | |
| Ret | 5 | (Germany) Sebastian Vettel | Ferrari | 7 | Suspension | 2 | |
Fastest lap: (Monaco) Charles Leclerc (Ferrari) – 1:36.169 (lap 44)

Notes

- ^1 – Includes one point for fastest lap.
- ^2 – Daniil Kvyat originally finished 10th, but received a 5-second time penalty for causing a collision with Sergio Pérez.
- ^3 – Pierre Gasly and Kevin Magnussen were classified as they completed more than 90% of the race distance.

== Championship standings after the race ==
Drivers' Championship standings

| | Pos. | Driver | Points |
|---|---|---|---|
| | 1 | (United Kingdom) **Lewis Hamilton** | 381 |
| | 2 | (Finland) Valtteri Bottas | 314 |
| | 3 | (Monaco) Charles Leclerc | 249 |
| 1 | 4 | (Netherlands) Max Verstappen | 235 |
| 1 | 5 | (Germany) Sebastian Vettel | 230 |

Constructors' Championship standings

| Pos. | Constructor | Points |
|---|---|---|
| 1 | (Germany) **Mercedes** | 695 |
| 2 | (Italy) Ferrari | 479 |
| 3 | (Austria) Red Bull Racing-Honda | 366 |
| 4 | (United Kingdom) McLaren-Renault | 121 |
| 5 | (France) Renault | 83 |

- Note: Only the top five positions are included for both sets of standings.
- **Bold text** indicates the 2019 World Champions.

| Previous race: 2019 Mexican Grand Prix | FIA Formula One World Championship; 2019 season | Next race: 2019 Brazilian Grand Prix |
| Previous race: 2018 United States Grand Prix | United States Grand Prix | Next race: 2021 United States Grand Prix |
