= 2019 Mexican Grand Prix =

Race 18 of 21 in the 2019 Formula One World Championship
← Previous race	Next race →

Race details
- Date: 27 October 2019
- Official name: Formula 1 Gran Premio de México 2019
- Location: Autódromo Hermanos Rodríguez, Mexico City, Mexico
- Course: Permanent racing facility
- Course length: 4.304 km (2.674 miles)
- Distance: 71 laps, 305.354 km (189.738 miles)
- Weather: Partly cloudy
- Attendance: 345,694

Pole position
Driver	(Monaco) Charles Leclerc	Ferrari
- Time: 1:15.024

Fastest lap
Driver	(Monaco) Charles Leclerc	Ferrari
- Time: 1:19.232 on lap 53

Podium
First	(United Kingdom) Lewis Hamilton	Mercedes
Second	(Germany) Sebastian Vettel	Ferrari
Third	(Finland) Valtteri Bottas	Mercedes

The 2019 Mexican Grand Prix (formally known as the Formula 1 Gran Premio de México 2019) was a Formula One motor race held on 27 October 2019 at the Autódromo Hermanos Rodríguez in Mexico City. The race was the 18th round of the 2019 Formula One World Championship and marked the 21st running of the Mexican Grand Prix, and the 20th time that the race had been run as a World Championship event since the inaugural season in 1950. Lewis Hamilton won the race, his 10th victory of the season and Mercedes' 100th race win in Formula One.

This was Vettel's last podium until the 2020 Turkish Grand Prix.

== Background ==
=== Track changes ===
Ahead of the race it was announced that a third DRS zone would be added between turns 11 and 12, to aid overtaking. The detection point is established after turn 9.

=== Championship standings before the race ===
Lewis Hamilton had a chance to win the World Drivers' Championship at this Grand Prix for the third straight year if he outscored his only remaining title contender, Valtteri Bottas, by 14 points or more.

=== Entrants ===
The drivers and teams were the same as the season entry list with no additional stand-in drivers for the race. However, Nicholas Latifi drove in the first practice session for Williams, replacing Robert Kubica.

== Qualifying ==
On the final flying laps of the third qualifying session, Valtteri Bottas crashed heavily into the outside wall at turn 17 having previously set the sixth-fastest time. Bottas was uninjured, however the accident brought out the yellow flag, requiring the drivers passing to slow down. Max Verstappen, who had already set the fastest time, failed to slow down when passing the yellow flags. He was later handed a three-place grid penalty for this infraction, and as a result the pole position was inherited by Charles Leclerc, with his teammate Sebastian Vettel joining him on the front row.

=== Qualifying classification ===
Pos.	No.	Driver	Constructor	Qualifying times			Final grid
Pos.	No.	Driver	Constructor	Q1	Q2	Q3	Final grid
1	33	(Netherlands) Max Verstappen	Red Bull Racing-Honda	1:15.949	1:16.136	1:14.758	4^{a}
2	16	(Monaco) Charles Leclerc	Ferrari	1:16.364	1:16.219	1:15.024	1
3	5	(Germany) Sebastian Vettel	Ferrari	1:16.696	1:15.914	1:15.170	2
4	44	(United Kingdom) Lewis Hamilton	Mercedes	1:16.424	1:15.721	1:15.262	3
5	23	(Thailand) Alexander Albon	Red Bull Racing-Honda	1:16.175	1:16.574	1:15.336	5
6	77	(Finland) Valtteri Bottas	Mercedes	1:17.062	1:15.852	1:15.338	6
7	55	(Spain) Carlos Sainz Jr.	McLaren-Renault	1:17.044	1:16.267	1:16.014	7
8	4	(United Kingdom) Lando Norris	McLaren-Renault	1:17.092	1:16.447	1:16.322	8
9	26	(Russia) Daniil Kvyat	Scuderia Toro Rosso-Honda	1:17.041	1:16.657	1:16.469	9
10	10	(France) Pierre Gasly	Scuderia Toro Rosso-Honda	1:17.065	1:16.679	1:16.586	10
11	11	(Mexico) Sergio Pérez	Racing Point-BWT Mercedes	1:17.465	1:16.687	N/A	11
12	27	(Germany) Nico Hülkenberg	Renault	1:17.608	1:16.885	N/A	12
13	3	(Australia) Daniel Ricciardo	Renault	1:17.270	1:16.933	N/A	13
14	7	(Finland) Kimi Räikkönen	Alfa Romeo Racing-Ferrari	1:17.225	1:16.967	N/A	14
15	99	(Italy) Antonio Giovinazzi	Alfa Romeo Racing-Ferrari	1:17.794	1:17.269	N/A	15
16	18	(Canada) Lance Stroll	Racing Point-BWT Mercedes	1:18.065	N/A	N/A	16
17	20	(Denmark) Kevin Magnussen	Haas-Ferrari	1:18.436	N/A	N/A	17
18	8	(France) Romain Grosjean	Haas-Ferrari	1:18.599	N/A	N/A	18
19	63	(United Kingdom) George Russell	Williams-Mercedes	1:18.823	N/A	N/A	19
20	88	(Poland) Robert Kubica	Williams-Mercedes	1:20.179	N/A	N/A	20
107% time: 1:21.265

Notes

- ^a – Max Verstappen set the fastest time in qualifying, but received a three-place grid penalty for failing to slow for yellow flags.

== Race ==
On the opening lap, Max Verstappen and Lewis Hamilton made light contact at turn 2 causing both cars to take to the grass and lose positions to Alexander Albon and the McLarens of Carlos Sainz Jr. and Lando Norris, who had taken advantage of Valtteri Bottas' poor start to get ahead. A virtual safety car was briefly called at the end of the lap in order to clear debris from the track at turn 2 following minor contact between Kimi Räikkönen and Kevin Magnussen. On lap 4 Hamilton re-passed Sainz to take 4th place. Verstappen overtook Bottas for 7th place on the inside of turn 13, however, the Red Bull's right-rear tyre made contact with Bottas' car causing Verstappen to suffer a puncture. Verstappen's tyre did not deflate until after he had passed the pit entry, with the tyre detaching soon after, causing him to fall to last place as he completed the lap with only three tyres. Verstappen emerged from the pits over 30 seconds behind 19th-placed Romain Grosjean.

On lap 8 Bottas passed Sainz to take 5th place. On lap 13 Norris made his first pit stop from 7th place. The McLaren pit crew failed to properly attach his front-left wheel and he was forced to pull over at the end of the pit lane. Had Norris exited the pits he would have been forced to retire from the race, however, the pit crew were able to run to his car and push it back to the pit box in order to correctly fit the wheel. Norris spent almost two minutes in the pits and exited in last place, a lap down on the leaders. Albon was the first of the front-runners to make a pit stop, from 3rd place on lap 14. He was followed by Charles Leclerc thus handing the lead of the race to teammate Sebastian Vettel. Albon and Leclerc both fitted a second set of medium-compound tyres meaning they would have to stop again later in the race and committing them to a two-stop strategy. Problems continued in the pits as Antonio Giovinazzi's car was dropped from its jack before all tyres were fitted causing him to be stationary for almost 20 seconds.

Hamilton pitted on lap 23 gaining a place on Albon after the Red Bull driver had lost time whilst attempting to overtake Sainz. Hamilton was fitted with hard-compound tyres and hence was not expected to pit again. Bottas pitted on lap 36, as did Vettel from the lead on the following lap. Vettel emerged in 4th place behind Hamilton losing a place to the Mercedes driver in the pits. Leclerc made his second stop from the lead on lap 43, however, more pit problems occurred as a slow pit stop caused him to remain stationary for 6.2 seconds. Leclerc exited the pits in 5th place, over 15 seconds behind leader Hamilton. Albon also made his second stop on the following lap emerging in 5th place.

On lap 51 Daniel Ricciardo was the last driver to make a pit stop having started on the hard-compound tyres. This allowed Verstappen to claim 6th place after spending the race fighting through the field finally catching up to the front-runners after his puncture. At the same time Norris was brought into the pits and retired from the race in order to limit damage to the car after the earlier erroneous pitstop. At this stage, the order of the top five was Hamilton, Vettel, Bottas, Leclerc and Albon. Räikkönen was retired from the race on lap 59 after suffering from overheating problems. In the closing laps of the race the top four drivers closed up to within just five seconds of each other, however, none were able to make any overtakes. Hamilton crossed the finish line to take his tenth Grand Prix victory of the season outscoring his third-placed teammate Bottas by only 10 points, fewer than the 14 needed to claim the title at this race.

Post-race Daniil Kvyat was handed a 10-second time penalty for causing a collision with Nico Hülkenberg. Kvyat attempted an overtake on Hülkenberg for 9th place at the final corner on the final lap but clipped Hülkenberg and sent him spinning into the wall breaking his rear wing. Hülkenberg was able to cross the finish line but lost a place to Pierre Gasly as a result leaving him in 11th place outside of the points. Kvyat's penalty demoted him to 11th place and promoted Gasly and Hülkenberg to 9th and 10th respectively.

=== Race classification ===
Pos.	No.	Driver	Constructor	Laps	Time/Retired	Grid	Points
1	44	(United Kingdom) Lewis Hamilton	Mercedes	71	1:36:48.904	3	25
2	5	(Germany) Sebastian Vettel	Ferrari	71	+1.766	2	18
3	77	(Finland) Valtteri Bottas	Mercedes	71	+3.553	6	15
4	16	(Monaco) Charles Leclerc	Ferrari	71	+6.368	1	13^{1}
5	23	(Thailand) Alexander Albon	Red Bull Racing-Honda	71	+21.399	5	10
6	33	(Netherlands) Max Verstappen	Red Bull Racing-Honda	71	+1:08.807	4	8
7	11	(Mexico) Sergio Pérez	Racing Point-BWT Mercedes	71	+1:13.819	11	6
8	3	(Australia) Daniel Ricciardo	Renault	71	+1:14.924	13	4
9	10	(France) Pierre Gasly	Scuderia Toro Rosso-Honda	70	+1 lap	10	2
10	27	(Germany) Nico Hülkenberg	Renault	70	+1 lap	12	1
11	26	(Russia) Daniil Kvyat	Scuderia Toro Rosso-Honda	70	+1 lap^{2}	9	
12	18	(Canada) Lance Stroll	Racing Point-BWT Mercedes	70	+1 lap	16	
13	55	(Spain) Carlos Sainz Jr.	McLaren-Renault	70	+1 lap	7	
14	99	(Italy) Antonio Giovinazzi	Alfa Romeo Racing-Ferrari	70	+1 lap	15	
15	20	(Denmark) Kevin Magnussen	Haas-Ferrari	69	+2 laps	17	
16	63	(United Kingdom) George Russell	Williams-Mercedes	69	+2 laps	19	
17	8	(France) Romain Grosjean	Haas-Ferrari	69	+2 laps	18	
18	88	(Poland) Robert Kubica	Williams-Mercedes	69	+2 laps	20	
Ret	7	(Finland) Kimi Räikkönen	Alfa Romeo Racing-Ferrari	58	Overheating	14	
Ret	4	(United Kingdom) Lando Norris	McLaren-Renault	48	Withdrew	8	
Fastest lap: (Monaco) Charles Leclerc (Ferrari) – 1:19.232 (lap 53)

Notes

- ^1 – Includes one point for fastest lap.
- ^2 – Daniil Kvyat originally finished 9th, but received a 10-second time penalty for causing a collision with Nico Hülkenberg.

== Championship standings after the race ==
Drivers' Championship standings

	Pos.	Driver	Points
	1	(United Kingdom) **Lewis Hamilton***	363
	2	(Finland) **Valtteri Bottas***	289
	3	(Monaco) Charles Leclerc	236
1	4	(Germany) Sebastian Vettel	230
1	5	(Netherlands) Max Verstappen	220

Constructors' Championship standings

Pos.	Constructor	Points
1	(Germany) **Mercedes**	652
2	(Italy) Ferrari	466
3	(Austria) Red Bull Racing-Honda	341
4	(United Kingdom) McLaren-Renault	111
5	(France) Renault	73

- Note: Only the top five positions are included for both sets of standings.
- **Bold text** indicates the 2019 World Constructors' Champions.
- **Bold text** and an asterisk indicates competitors who still had a theoretical chance of becoming World Champion.

Previous race: 2019 Japanese Grand Prix	FIA Formula One World Championship; 2019 season	Next race: 2019 United States Grand Prix
Previous race: 2018 Mexican Grand Prix	Mexican Grand Prix	Next race: 2021 Mexico City Grand Prix
Awards
Preceded by 2018 Mexican Grand Prix	Formula One Promotional Trophy for Race Promoter; 2019	Succeeded by TBD
