= Ferrari F1-75 =

2022 Formula One racing car by Ferrari

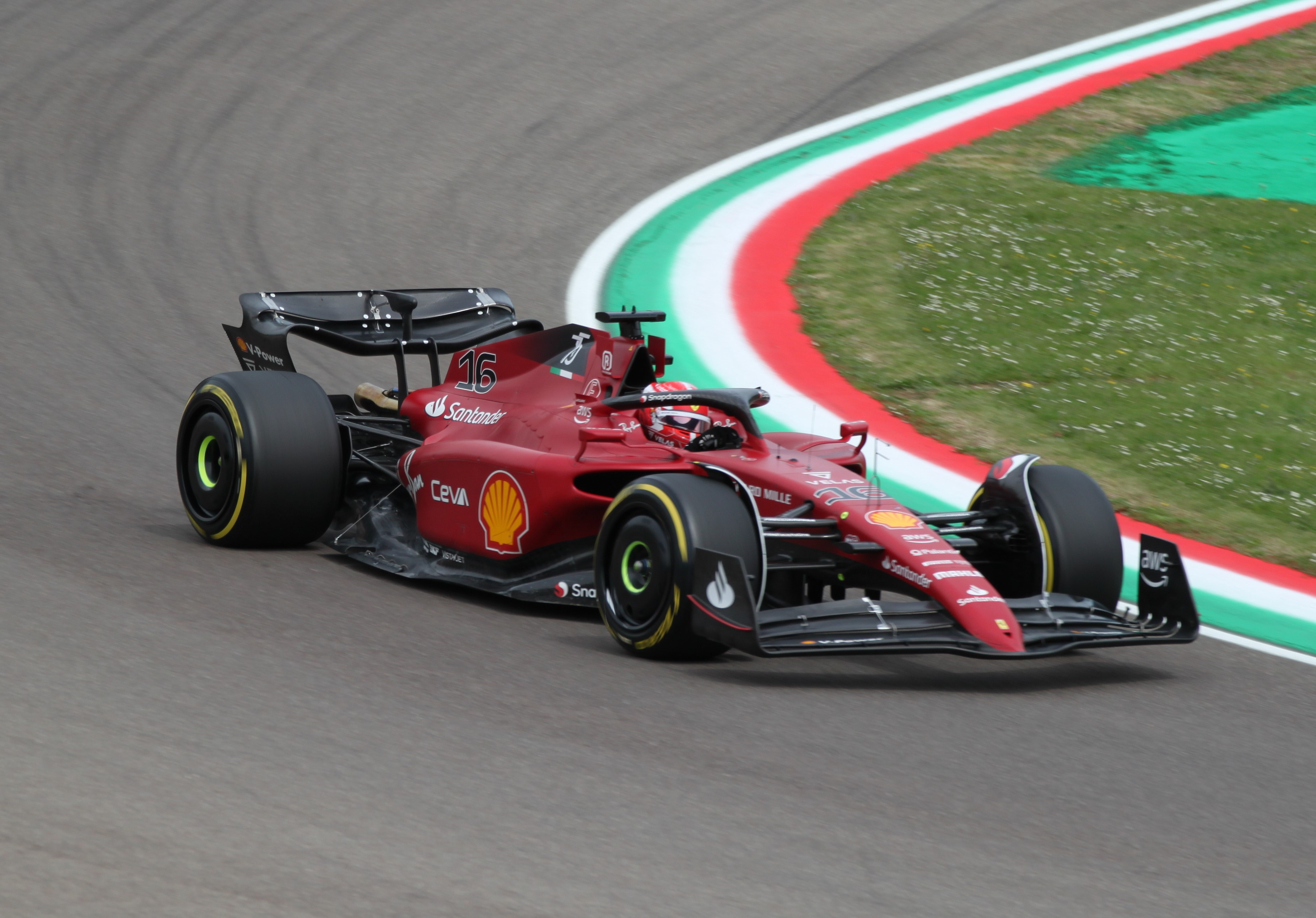
- Charles Leclerc driving the F1-75 at the Emilia Romagna Grand Prix
- Category: Formula One
- Constructor: Scuderia Ferrari
- Designers: Enrico Cardile (Head Engineer of Chassis Area); David Sanchez (Chief Engineer – Vehicle Concept); Fabio Montecchi (Chief Project Engineer); Enrico Racca (Head of Supply Chain & Manufacturing); Tiziano Battistini (Head of Chassis Design); Marco Adurno (Head of Vehicle Performance); Diego Tondi (Head of Aerodynamic Developments); Thomas Bouché (Head of Aerodynamic Performance); Rory Byrne (Technical Consultant); Enrico Gualtieri (Head of Engine Area); Wolf Zimmermann (Chief Engineer, Power Unit)
- Predecessor: Ferrari SF21
- Successor: Ferrari SF-23

Technical specifications
- Suspension (front): Double wishbone push-rod
- Suspension (rear): Double wishbone pull-rod
- Engine: Ferrari Tipo 066/7 1.6 L (98 cu in) direct injection V6 turbocharged engine limited to 15,000 RPM in a mid-mounted, rear-wheel drive layout 1.6 L (98 cu in) Turbo Rear-mid mounted
- Electric motor: Kinetic and thermal energy recovery systems
- Transmission: 8 forward + 1 reverse
- Fuel: Shell V-Power Unleaded E10
- Lubricants: Shell Helix Ultra
- Tyres: Pirelli P Zero (Dry/Slick); Pirelli Cinturato (Wet/Treaded)

Competition history
- Notable entrants: Scuderia Ferrari
- Notable drivers: 16. (Monaco) Charles Leclerc; 55. (Spain) Carlos Sainz Jr.
- Debut: 2022 Bahrain Grand Prix
- First win: 2022 Bahrain Grand Prix
- Last win: 2022 Austrian Grand Prix
- Last event: 2022 Abu Dhabi Grand Prix
Races	Wins	Podiums	Poles	F/Laps
22	4	20	12	5

The Ferrari F1-75 (also known by its internal name, Project 674) is a Formula One racing car designed and constructed by Scuderia Ferrari which competed in the 2022 Formula One World Championship.

The car was driven by Charles Leclerc and Carlos Sainz Jr. The chassis is Ferrari's first single seater under the 2022 FIA Technical Regulations. The F1-75 scored four wins, from the Bahrain, the Australian, the British, and the Austrian Grands Prix, and 20 podiums from its 22 races. The car made its competitive debut at the 2022 Bahrain Grand Prix.

== Competition and development history ==
The name refers to the 75th anniversary since the first Ferrari production car rolled out of the factory in Maranello. The F1-75 was used in a tyre test following the Emilia Romagna Grand Prix and was investigated after it appeared to have been run with a new floor specification that had not been previously used. The FIA ruled that the floor had been previously used during pre-season testing and was, therefore, compliant with the regulations.

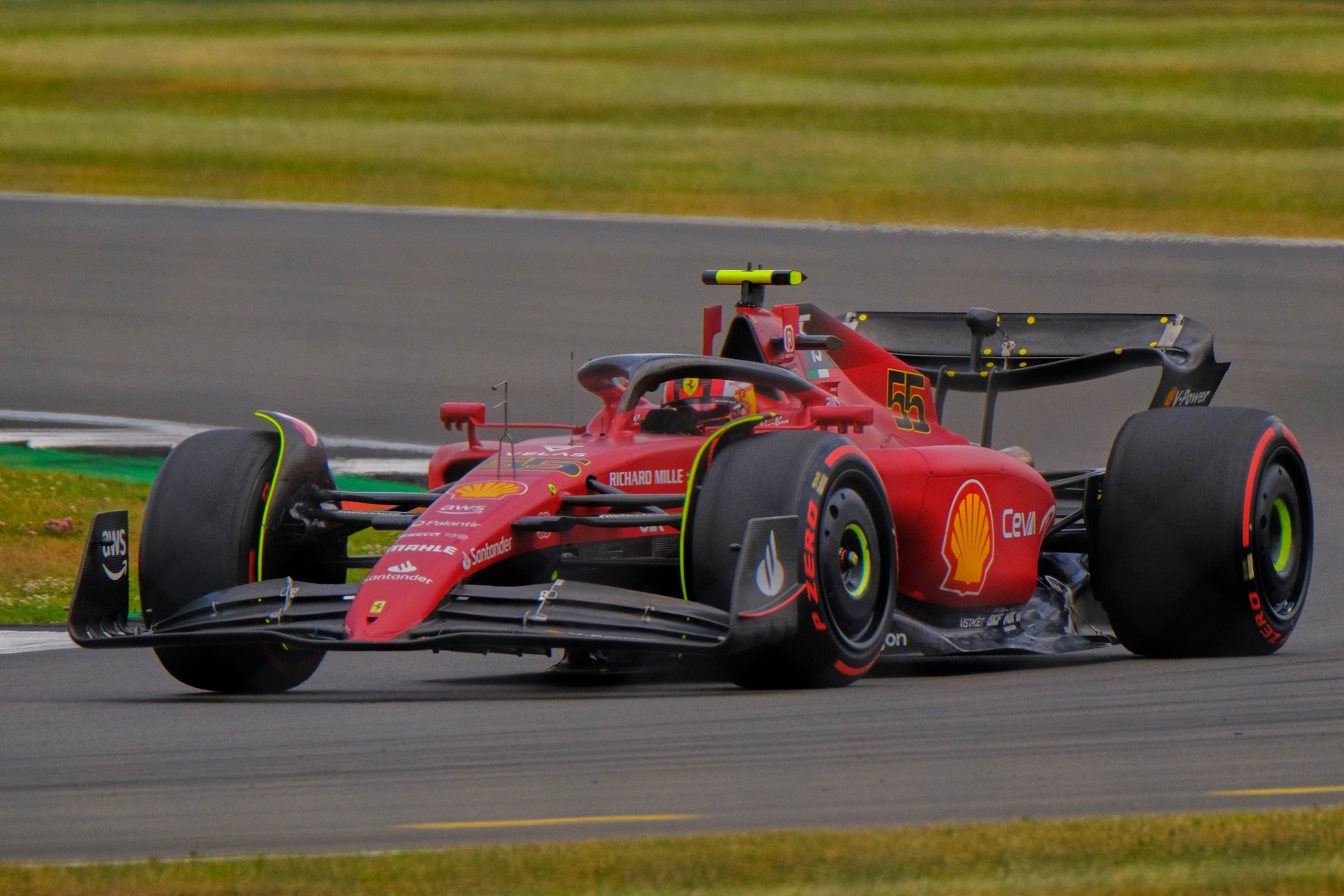
Carlos Sainz Jr. took home his maiden career victory at the British Grand Prix

Compared to the winless 2020 and 2021 cars, the F1-75 was immediately competitive; the team took pole and followed that up with a 1–2 finish, which saw Leclerc winning and Sainz in second, at the first race in Bahrain. At the 2022 Saudi Arabian Grand Prix the car qualified in second and third, and, after a safety car, Leclerc would lead for the majority of the race but ultimately was overtaken by Max Verstappen for the win in the final five laps. Both Ferraris would still end up on the podium as Sainz finished in third, just ahead of Sergio Pérez. Leclerc continued this podium streak in Australia in dominant form, and got his first career grand slam, the first for Ferrari since 2010. Sainz retired on lap one after spinning into gravel and beaching his car. Compared to its main rival, the Red Bull RB18, the F1-75 often displayed superior cornering speeds, but the RB18 was better on the straights. Leclerc took four consecutive poles from Miami to Baku, but the team failed to convert any of these poles to wins through a combination of unreliability and poor strategy. At the British Grand Prix, Sainz took pole and won his first Formula One race. At the following race in Austria, the F1-75 took another victory with Leclerc, who achieved his 5th Grand Prix victory.

Despite being competitive in the first half of the season, the F1-75 suffered from porpoising and poor engine reliability; to address that, Ferrari downtuned the engines at the Belgian Grand Prix. The porpoising was addressed by FIA's Technical Directive 39 which took effect at the same race. Reports emerged that the Technical Directive caused the F1-75 to suffer increased tyre wear in subsequent races.

In November 2022, Mattia Binotto stated that Ferrari could not afford to upgrade the car due to them having hit the cost cap, which further contributed to the car's downturn in competitiveness in the second half of the season.

== Livery ==
The F1-75 was the first Ferrari F1 car to feature Santander branding since the SF70H in 2017 in which the team received sponsorship from Santander following the success of the team finishing third in Constructors' Championship in previous season.

At their home Grand Prix, the car ran in a special livery to celebrate the 75th anniversary of Ferrari road cars. It features a yellow dash graphics.

== Complete Formula One results ==
Key

Key
Colour	Result
Gold	Winner
Silver	Second place
Bronze	Third place
Green	Other points position
Blue	Other classified position
Blue	Not classified, finished (NC)
Purple	Not classified, retired (Ret)
Red	Did not qualify (DNQ)
Black	Disqualified (DSQ)
White	Did not start (DNS)
White	Race cancelled (C)
Blank	Did not practice (DNP)
Blank	Excluded (EX)
Blank	Did not arrive (DNA)
Blank	Withdrawn (WD)
Blank	Did not enter (empty cell)
Annotation	Meaning
P	Pole position
F	Fastest lap
Superscript number	Points-scoring position in sprint

Year	Entrant	Power unit	Tyres	Driver name	Grands Prix																						Points	WCC pos.
Year	Entrant	Power unit	Tyres	Driver name	BHR	SAU	AUS	EMI	MIA	ESP	MON	AZE	CAN	GBR	AUT	FRA	HUN	BEL	NED	ITA	SIN	JPN	USA	MXC	SAP	ABU	Points	WCC pos.
2022	Scuderia Ferrari	Ferrari 066/7	P	(Monaco) Charles Leclerc	1^{P}^{F}	2^{F}	1^{P}^{F}	6^{2}	2^{P}	Ret^{P}	4^{P}	Ret^{P}	5	4	1^{2}	Ret^{P}	6	6	3	2^{P}	2^{P}	3	3	6	4^{6}	2	554	2nd
2022	Scuderia Ferrari	Ferrari 066/7	P	(Spain) Carlos Sainz Jr.	2	3	Ret	Ret^{4}	3	4	2	Ret	2^{F}	1^{P}	Ret^{3}	5^{F}	4	3^{P}	8	4	3	Ret	Ret^{P}	5	3^{2}	4	554	2nd
