= Ferrari SF-25 =

2025 Formula One car

- The SF-25 driven by Charles Leclerc during free practice at the Austrian Grand Prix
- Category: Formula One
- Constructor: Scuderia Ferrari
- Designers: Enrico Cardile (Technical Director – Chassis); Fabio Montecchi (Chief Project Engineer); Enrico Racca (Head of Supply Chain & Manufacturing); Tiziano Battistini (Head of Chassis Design); Marco Adurno (Head of Vehicle Performance); Diego Tondi (Head of Aerodynamics); Thomas Bouché (Head of Aerodynamic Performance); Rory Byrne (Technical Consultant); Enrico Gualtieri (Technical Director - Power Unit)
- Predecessor: Ferrari SF-24
- Successor: Ferrari SF-26

Technical specifications
- Chassis: Carbon fibre composite with survival cell and honeycomb structure
- Suspension (front): Double wishbone pull-rod
- Suspension (rear): Double wishbone pull-rod
- Engine: Ferrari 066/15 1.6 L (98 cu in) direct injection V6 turbocharged engine limited to 15,000 RPM in a mid-mounted, rear-wheel drive layout 1.6 L (98 cu in) Turbo Rear-mid mounted
- Transmission: 8 forward + 1 reverse
- Weight: 800 kg (including driver, excluding fuel)
- Fuel: Shell V-Power
- Lubricants: Shell Helix Ultra
- Tyres: Pirelli P Zero (Dry/Slick); Pirelli Cinturato (Wet/Treaded)

Competition history
- Notable entrants: Scuderia Ferrari HP
- Notable drivers: 16. (Monaco) Charles Leclerc; 44. (United Kingdom) Lewis Hamilton
- Debut: 2025 Australian Grand Prix
- Last event: 2025 Abu Dhabi Grand Prix
Races	Wins	Podiums	Poles	F/Laps
24	0	7	1	2

The Ferrari SF-25 is a Formula One racing car designed and constructed by Scuderia Ferrari which competed in the 2025 Formula One World Championship. It was driven by Charles Leclerc and seven-time World Drivers' Champion Lewis Hamilton, the latter in his first season racing for Ferrari. The first Ferrari car since the Ferrari SF21 of 2021 to not score a Grand Prix win, the SF-25 scored one sprint win (at China), seven podiums, one pole position and two fastest laps.

Despite significant issues in its concept, the SF-25 managed for the first time in Formula One history to achieve a record of 14 consecutive races without a DNF. Leclerc also completed the season (24 races) without any mechanical failures or component-related penalties, making it arguably the most reliable Formula One car of the ground-effect regulations era.

== Competition and development history ==
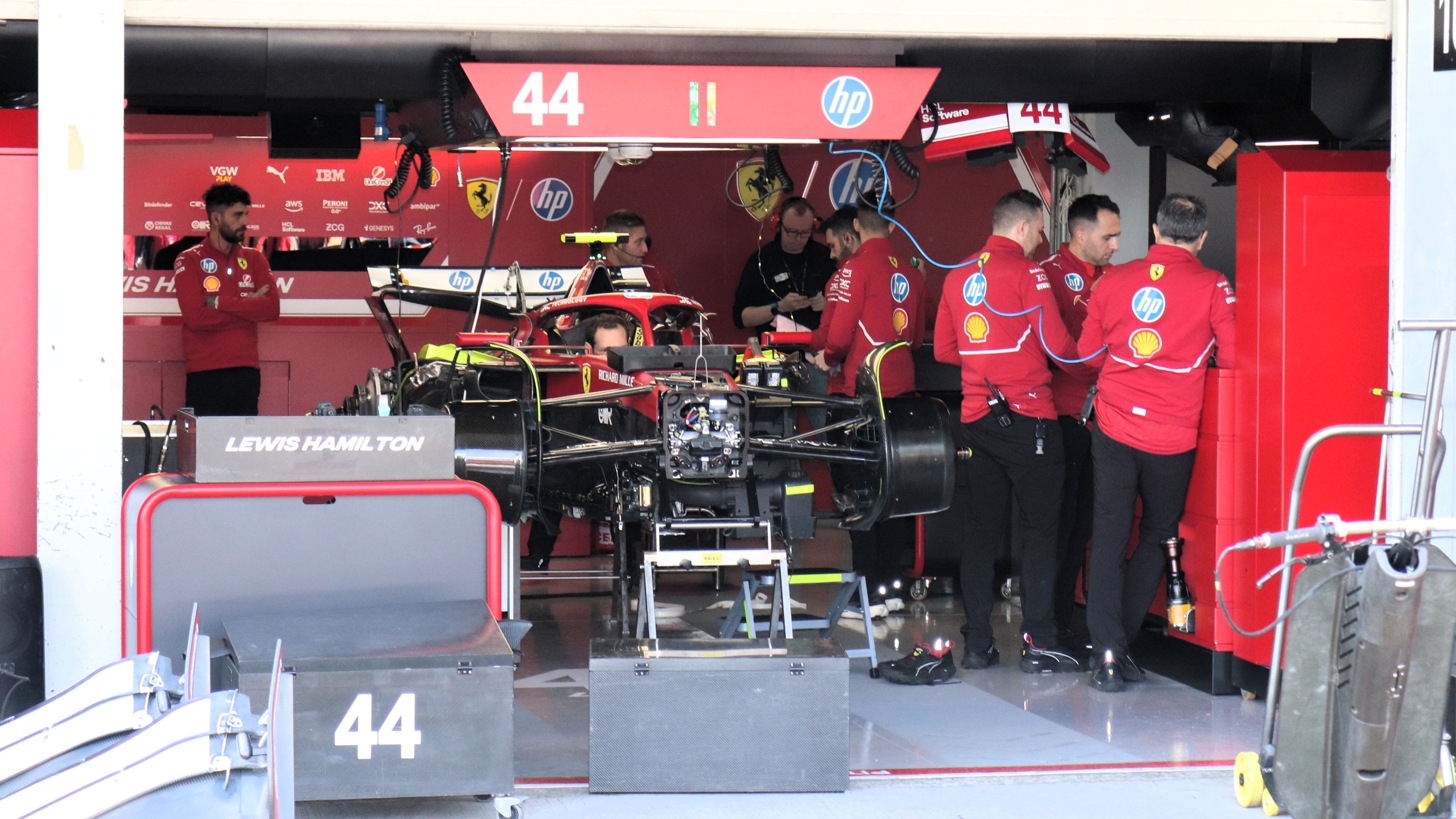
The SF-25 was the last Ferrari before new regulations took effect in 2026.

During pre-season testing at Bahrain International Circuit, new signee Hamilton set the second fastest time.

=== Race biography: Opening rounds ===
The Australian Grand Prix saw both Ferrari cars enter Q3, with Leclerc qualifying seventh and Hamilton eighth, before finishing eighth and tenth respectively. The Chinese Grand Prix saw both Ferrari cars enter SQ3 with Hamilton and Leclerc qualifying first and fourth, before finishing first and fifth, respectively, marking Ferrari's maiden sprint victory. During the qualifying for the main race, Hamilton and Leclerc would qualify fifth and sixth before being disqualified from the same finishing positions with Leclerc's car found to be underweight, and Hamilton's having excessive plank wear, marking the first time both cars of a team were disqualified since Renault had both cars disqualified at the 2019 Japanese Grand Prix.

Ferrari debuted a special HP livery for Miami. Leclerc crashed his car after aquaplaning on a reconnaissance lap before the rain-affected sprint and could not start the race, with the team opting to repair the damage to his car before qualifying. Hamilton salvaged a podium in third through a well-timed strategy, but he found himself knocked out of Q2 (starting twelfth) for the race proper, with Leclerc in eighth finding himself outqualified by both Williams cars. Ultimately, following a conflict on strategy and a pace deficit, the Ferraris finished seventh and eighth on track.

== Characteristics ==
=== Development of the SF-25 ===
The SF-25 was the last Ferrari car to utilise ground effect before it was removed for 2026. It was primarily developed by chassis technical director Enrico Cardile and was described by Ferrari as a "completely new car" that used the race-winning Ferrari SF-24 as a basic foundation. Although Cardile was placed on forced leave midway through the 2024 season following an unsuccessful upgrade package for the Spanish Grand Prix, the project of this car had progressed to its final stages under his team's supervision, and Loïc Serra, his replacement at Ferrari, had a minimal role in its development. One of the changes made by the team was the introduction of a pull-rod front suspension, as seen in the title-contending McLaren MCL38 and Red Bull Racing RB20, that replaced the push-rod front suspension as seen in previous Ferrari cars. The SF-25 kept the pull-rod rear suspension. Ferrari opined that changing such would clean up airflow around the car while opening up opportunities for further aerodynamic development.

Following a double disqualification at the Chinese Grand Prix, Ferrari stopped development of new aero parts in April to focus on the new aerodynamic regulations set to be introduced in the 2026 season; however, Ferrari developed one last upgrade package for the Belgian Grand Prix, which was not effective, and an upgrade due for the Azerbaijan Grand Prix, which would have introduced more effective downforce that never materialised. Unable to challenge McLaren's dominance, Ferrari had targeted second place in the Constructors' Championship but ended up falling behind close rivals Mercedes and Red Bull following a double retirement at São Paulo. Ferrari ultimately finished fourth in the Constructors' Championship and remained winless throughout the season, the first time since 2021 this has happened.

=== Livery ===
Hamilton driving the SF-25 with a special livery during the Italian Grand Prix.

The car's race livery was shown for the first time at the F1 75 Live event by Lewis Hamilton, Charles Leclerc, and team principal Frédéric Vasseur. This livery featured a darker shade of red and a large, white stripe on the engine cover over the HP logo. For the Saudi Arabia, Qatar, and Abu Dhabi Grands Prix, the Peroni logo was replaced with "ITALIA 0.0" due to regulations regarding alcohol sponsorship in the country.

A special livery was debuted for the Miami Grand Prix, which featured an emphasis on the HP branding akin to the previous year's livery. In Monaco, the Shell 75 logo appeared on the sidepods, marking 75 years of technical partnership. For the Italian Grand Prix, Ferrari unveiled a special livery that pays tribute to the Ferrari 312T, the car in which three-time champion Niki Lauda won his first two championships.

== Complete Formula One results ==
Key

Key
Colour	Result
Gold	Winner
Silver	Second place
Bronze	Third place
Green	Other points position
Blue	Other classified position
Blue	Not classified, finished (NC)
Purple	Not classified, retired (Ret)
Red	Did not qualify (DNQ)
Black	Disqualified (DSQ)
White	Did not start (DNS)
White	Race cancelled (C)
Blank	Did not practice (DNP)
Blank	Excluded (EX)
Blank	Did not arrive (DNA)
Blank	Withdrawn (WD)
Blank	Did not enter (empty cell)
Annotation	Meaning
P	Pole position
F	Fastest lap
Superscript number	Points-scoring position in sprint

Year	Entrant	Power unit	Tyres	Driver name	Grands Prix																								Points	WCC pos.
Year	Entrant	Power unit	Tyres	Driver name	AUS	CHN	JPN	BHR	SAU	MIA	EMI	MON	ESP	CAN	AUT	GBR	BEL	HUN	NED	ITA	AZE	SIN	USA	MXC	SAP	LVG	QAT	ABU	Points	WCC pos.
2025	Scuderia Ferrari HP	Ferrari; 066/15; 1.6 V6 t	P	(Monaco) Charles Leclerc	8	DSQ^{5}	4	4	3	7	6	2	3	5	3	14	3^{4}	4^{P}	Ret	4	9	6	3^{5}	2	Ret^{5}	4	8	4^{F}	398	4th
2025	Scuderia Ferrari HP	Ferrari; 066/15; 1.6 V6 t	P	(United Kingdom) Lewis Hamilton	10	DSQ^{1}	7	5	7	8^{3}	4	5	6	6	4	4	7	12	Ret	6	8	8^{F}	4^{4}	8	Ret^{7}	8	12	8	398	4th
