= Ferrari SF-26 =

2026 Formula One car

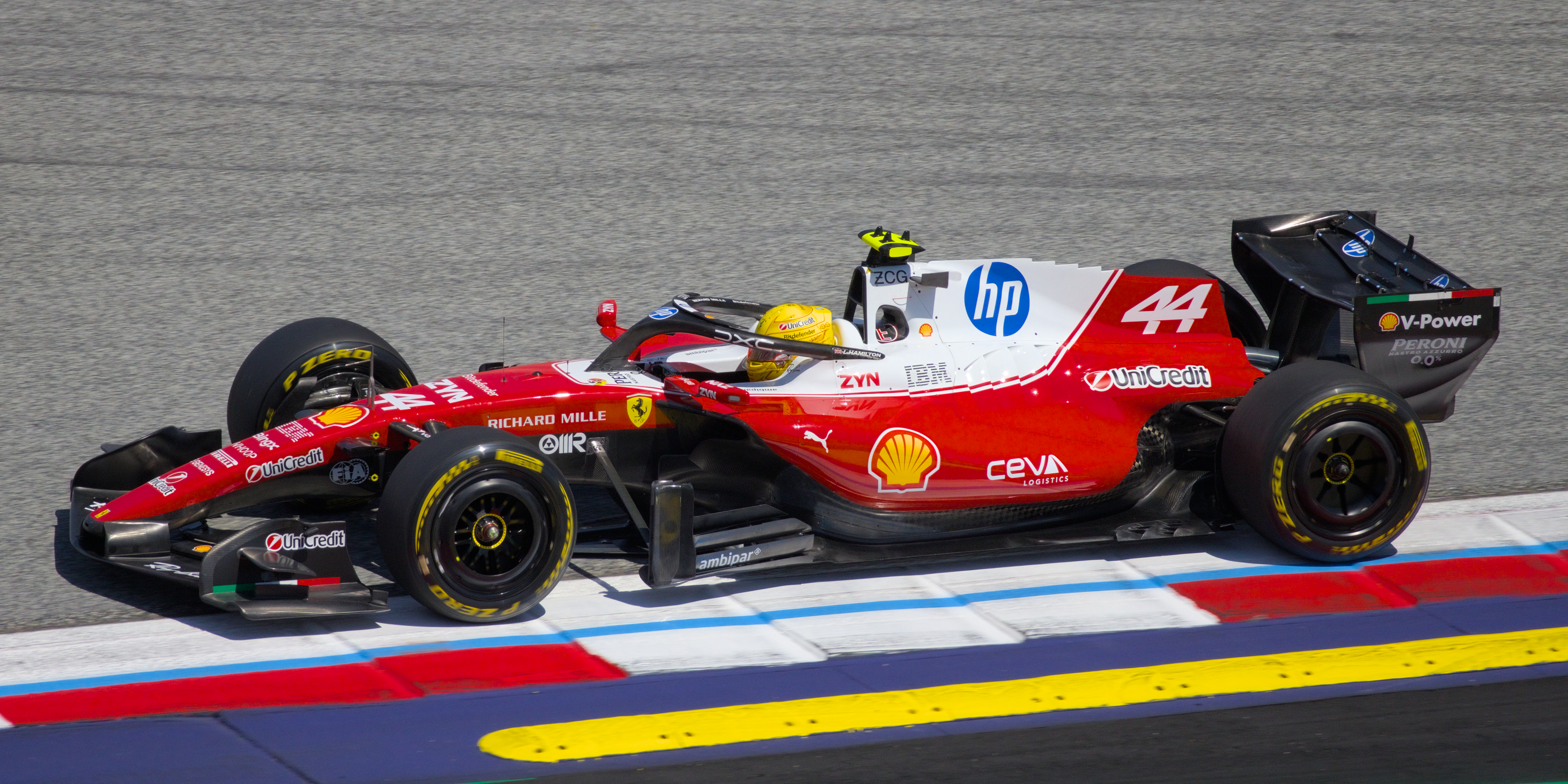
- Lewis Hamilton driving the SF-26 at the 2026 Austrian Grand Prix
- Category: Formula One
- Constructor: Scuderia Ferrari
- Designers: Loïc Serra (Technical Director – Chassis); Fabio Montecchi (Chief Project Engineer); Corrado Onorato (Chief Designer - New Car); Marco Adurno (Head of Vehicle Performance); Diego Tondi (Head of Aerodynamics); Franck Sanchez (Head of Aerodynamic Development); Rory Byrne (Technical Consultant); Enrico Gualtieri (Technical Director – Power Unit)
- Predecessor: Ferrari SF-25

Technical specifications
- Chassis: Carbon fibre composite with survival cell and honeycomb structure
- Suspension (front): Double wishbone push-rod
- Suspension (rear): Double wishbone push-rod
- Engine: Ferrari 067/6 1.6 L (98 cu in) direct injection V6 turbocharged engine limited to 15,000 RPM in a mid-mounted, rear-wheel drive layout turbo
- Transmission: 8 forward + 1 reverse
- Weight: 770 kg (including driver, coolant and oil)
- Fuel: Shell V-Power sustainable Ethanol
- Lubricants: Shell Helix Ultra/Pennzoil Ultra Platinum (United States races only)
- Tyres: Pirelli P Zero (Dry/Slick); Pirelli Cinturato (Wet/Treaded)

Competition history
- Notable entrants: Scuderia Ferrari HP
- Notable drivers: 16. (Monaco) Charles Leclerc; 44. (United Kingdom) Lewis Hamilton
- Debut: 2026 Australian Grand Prix
- First win: 2026 Barcelona-Catalunya Grand Prix
- Last win: 2026 British Grand Prix
- Last event: 2026 Las Vegas Grand Prix
Races	Wins	Podiums	Poles	F/Laps
20	2	13	1	6

The Ferrari SF-26, also known by its internal name Project 678, is a Formula One car designed and built by Scuderia Ferrari to compete in the 2026 Formula One World Championship. It is currently being driven by Charles Leclerc and seven-time World Drivers' Champion Lewis Hamilton in their eighth and second seasons with Ferrari, respectively. As of the 2026 São Paulo Grand Prix, the SF-26 has achieved thirteen Grand Prix podiums (plus seven sprint podiums), two Grand Prix victories (Hamilton in Barcelona and Leclerc in Great Britain), six Grand Prix fastest laps, two sprint fastest laps and one Grand Prix pole position.

== Characteristics ==
=== Development ===
Codenamed Project 678, the SF-26 is the first Ferrari car to be created for the 2026 Formula One regulations, and therefore features significant changes from its predecessor, the SF-25. Designed under the leadership of Chassis Technical Director Loïc Serra and Power Unit Technical Director Enrico Gualtieri, the SF-26 was first unveiled on the 23 January 2026 during a shakedown at the Fiorano Circuit, showing its new push-rod suspension and manual override mode. The SF-26 made its race debut at the season-opening 2026 Australian Grand Prix.

==== Modifications ====
===== Pre-season testing =====
For the final pre-season test at Bahrain International Circuit, the team unveiled a unique rear exhaust wing design that could help divert exhaust gases and act as an extension of the diffuser airflow. The team had been running a "spec A" version of the car prior to this change. The following day, the team unveiled a radical rear wing design that rotates upside down when active aerodynamics are enabled. The team reverted to a conventional rear wing for the evening.

===== Mid-season upgrades =====
For the Miami Grand Prix, Ferrari debuted eleven upgrades to the car, the most out of all the teams bringing upgrades that weekend. Modified components included the floor, floor edge, diffuser, rear wing, both endplates and front and rear suspension fairings Ferrari stated that the new front-end updates would bring flow feature stability and front wheel wake management, while the rear-end was developed with load increase in mind while increasing efficiency for the diffuser's pressure gradient. The resulting upstream flow would in turn help optimise the front floor's geometry and devices. Prior to the weekend, some parts of the package had been trialled at a filming day at Monza.

=== Livery ===
The SF-26 race livery was shown for the first time on 23 January 2026. The livery returns to a glossy lighter red finish, last used in 2018 on the SF71H, and a larger usage of white surrounding the airbox and engine cover reflecting the teams usage of white accents in the past.

== Competition history ==
The SF-26 debuted at the private pre-season shakedown at the Circuit de Barcelona-Catalunya, where Hamilton set the fastest time of the five-day test. The car made its public debut at the second pre-season test at Bahrain International Circuit.

=== Opening rounds ===
The SF-26 made its competitive debut at the 2026 Australian Grand Prix. Leclerc and Hamilton qualified in fourth and seventh, respectively. Ferrari's race starts were already observed during the pre-season test at Bahrain to be faster than other teams', which translated into Leclerc launching into the lead at the first turn against George Russell (Mercedes). He battled against Russell during the opening stages of the race, though a virtual safety car was called out for another driver's retirement. The team chose to stay out, giving Mercedes, who pitted their drivers, a tyre advantage. Ultimately, Leclerc and Hamilton finished third and fourth, respectively.

At the second round and the first of six sprint weekends in the Scuderia's campaign, Ferrari qualifying 4th and 6th for the sprint race. With yet again battling the Mercedes, both cars eventually finished 2nd and 3rd with qualifying for the main race 3rd and 4th later in the day. The main race had both Ferraris once again launching ahead of the Mercedes and also battling each other and exchanging the lead with Kimi Antonelli, the latter taking his first pole position. As a result, Hamilton took his first podium at Ferrari with 3rd place and Leclerc settled with 4th.

The 2026 Japanese Grand Prix qualifying had Leclerc qualify P4 and Hamilton P6. Once the race started, both Ferrari drivers were not in the lead as Oscar Piastri got ahead in turn 1. Hamilton got benefitted and pit because of the Safety Car but lost time. An overtake from Leclerc managed him to claim P3 and Hamilton almost finished ahead of Norris as the seven-time world champion drove to P6.

Due to the Bahrain and Saudi Arabian Grands Prix being removed from the calendar, the results carried over to the Miami Grand Prix, with Ferrari getting the most upgrades of any team for this race.

== Complete Formula One results ==
Key

Key
Colour	Result
Gold	Winner
Silver	Second place
Bronze	Third place
Green	Other points position
Blue	Other classified position
Blue	Not classified, finished (NC)
Purple	Not classified, retired (Ret)
Red	Did not qualify (DNQ)
Black	Disqualified (DSQ)
White	Did not start (DNS)
White	Race cancelled (C)
Blank	Did not practice (DNP)
Blank	Excluded (EX)
Blank	Did not arrive (DNA)
Blank	Withdrawn (WD)
Blank	Did not enter (empty cell)
Annotation	Meaning
P	Pole position
F	Fastest lap
Superscript number	Points-scoring position in sprint

Year	Entrant	Power unit	Tyres	Driver name	Grands Prix																							Points	WCC pos.
Year	Entrant	Power unit	Tyres	Driver name	AUS	CHN	JPN	MIA	CAN	MON	BCN	AUT	GBR	BEL	HUN	NED	ITA	ESP	AZE	BHR	SIN	USA	MXC	SAP	LVG	QAT	ABU	Points	WCC pos.
2026	Scuderia Ferrari HP	Ferrari 067/6	P	(Monaco) Charles Leclerc	3	4^{2}	3	8^{3}	4^{5}	Ret	15†	8	1^{5}	2	4^{F}	5^{2 F}	Ret	4	4	4	2^{3 F}	2^{F}	4	8				510*	2nd*
2026	Scuderia Ferrari HP	Ferrari 067/6	P	(United Kingdom) Lewis Hamilton	4	3^{3}	6	6^{7}	2^{6}	2	1^{F}	5	3^{2}	4	5	4^{7}	6	Ret	6	3	6^{2}	4	2^{P}^{F}	9				510*	2nd*

* Season still in progress.
