= Ferrari V6 hybrid Formula One power unit =

Formula 1 engine from 2014-present

Ferrari 1.6 V6 turbo
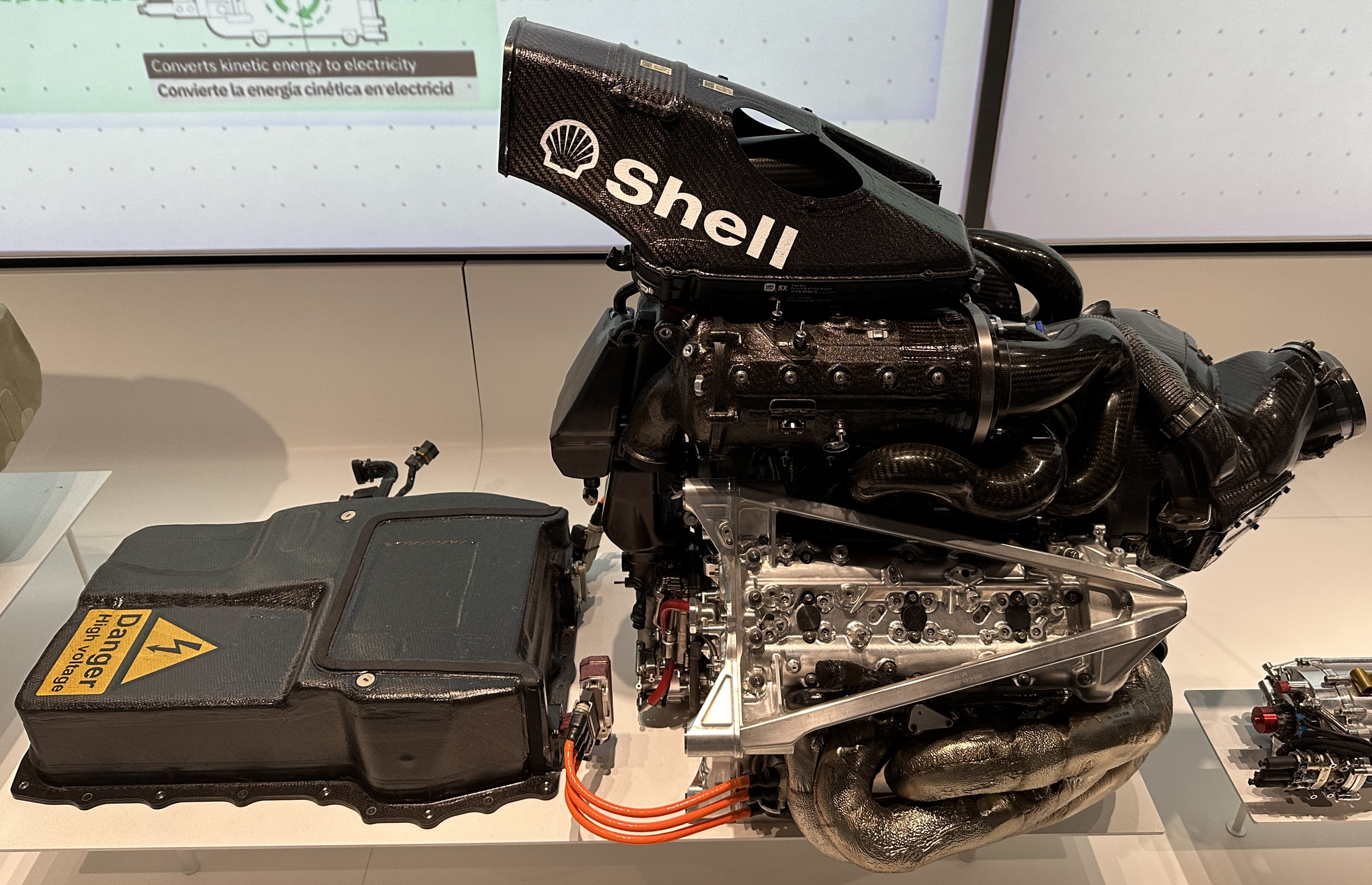
- The 065/6 internal combustion engine and its energy storage unit, pictured on display in 2023

Overview
- Manufacturer: (Italy) Scuderia Ferrari
- Production: 2014–present

Layout
- Configuration: V-6 single hybrid turbocharged engine, 90° cylinder angle
- Displacement: 1.6 litres (98 cubic inches)
- Cylinder bore: 80 mm (3.15 in)
- Piston stroke: 53 mm (2.09 in)
- Cylinder block material: Aluminum alloy
- Cylinder head material: Aluminum alloy
- Valvetrain: 24-valve (four-valves per cylinder), DOHC

Combustion
- Turbocharger: Hybrid turbocharger with typical 3.5-5.0 bar boost pressure
- Fuel system: 500 bar (7,252 psi) gasoline direct injection
- Management: McLaren TAG-320
- Fuel type: Shell V-Power unleaded gasoline 94.25% + 5.75% biofuel
- Oil system: Dry sump
- Cooling system: Single water pump

Output
- Power output: 600–680 + 160 hp (447–507 + 119 kW) (2014-2016); 771 + 160 hp (575 + 119 kW) (2017-2018); 850 + 160 hp (634 + 119 kW) (2019-present)
- Torque output: Approx. 600–822 N⋅m (443–606 ft⋅lb)

Dimensions
- Dry weight: 145 kg (320 lb) overall including headers, clutch, ECU, spark box or filters

Chronology
- Predecessor: Ferrari V8 F1

The Ferrari Tipo series is a series of 1.6-litre, turbocharged, and V6 hybrid Formula One racing engines developed and produced by Scuderia Ferrari starting with the Tipo 059/3 designation for the 2014 Formula One World Championship. In addition to their role as a factory-backed team by supplying their own Formula One team, Ferrari engines are being used by Haas and Cadillac, the latter in an interim role until development of their own power unit commences for the 2029 season. Previously, Ferrari's hybrid V6 engines also saw use in Sauber, Scuderia Toro Rosso, and Marussia's cars. Cars powered by Ferrari engines scored 159 podiums, 27 victories, and 47 pole positions since their inception in 2014; the strongest results from a car powered by a Ferrari engine came during the 2018 Formula One World Championship, with the Ferrari SF71H taking six wins, 24 podiums and six pole positions.

== Development and design ==
The V6 turbo engine was developed under the direction of Luca Marmorini and Mattia Binotto. The engine itself is coupled with an energy recovery system hybrid unit, and all evolutions and newer iterations of the power unit are based on the same basic hybrid architecture that has existed since 2014.

As part of the 2026 regulation change, the MGU-H was removed.

== Naming ==
Ferrari 059/3 was the engine's official name in the 2014 inaugural season. In the following seasons, the further expansion stages of the engine were each given new names. Formally, all expansion forms were based on the basic structure that has existed since 2014.

== 2019 investigation ==
The Type 064 of the 2019 Formula One World Championship was often criticised from the middle of the season. While the Ferrari SF90 put in a strong performance throughout the 2019 season, their performance was particularly strong between the 2019 Belgian Grand Prix on 1 September and the 2019 Mexican Grand Prix on 27 October. During these races, Ferrari took six consecutive pole positions and scored their only victories of the season in these races. As their form had noticeably improved compared to the first 12 races of the season, Red Bull Racing made an inquiry to the FIA and asked for clarification on whether the use of a system used by Ferrari that bypasses the fuel flow sensor is permissible. Red Bull accused Ferrari of installing the sensor in such a way that it could not measure an increased illegal fuel flow. The FIA responded with a technical guideline ahead of the 2019 United States Grand Prix on 3 November, reminding all competitors that such systems are not allowed. As a result, Ferrari's form faded. As the season progressed, they managed neither a pole position nor a win. Max Verstappen then publicly accused Ferrari of cheating. After the end of testing for the 2020 Formula One World Championship, the FIA announced that it had completed its investigation into the Type 064 engine and entered into a private agreement with Ferrari. The FIA refused to disclose the results of the investigation after protests from the other teams.

== Applications ==
- Tipo 059/3
  - Ferrari F14 T (2014)
  - Marussia MR03 (2014)
  - Sauber C33 (2014)
  - Marussia MR03B (2015)
- Tipo 060
  - Ferrari SF15-T (2015)
  - Sauber C34 (2015)
  - Toro Rosso STR11 (2016)
- Tipo 061
  - Ferrari SF16-H (2016)
  - Haas VF-16 (2016)
  - Sauber C35 (2016)
  - Sauber C36 (2017)
- Tipo 062 (2017)
  - Ferrari SF70H
  - Haas VF-17
- Tipo 062 EVO (2018)
  - Ferrari SF71H
  - Haas VF-18
  - Sauber C37
- Tipo 064 (2019)
  - Ferrari SF90
  - Alfa Romeo Racing C38
  - Haas VF-19
- Tipo 065 (2020)
  - Ferrari SF1000
  - Alfa Romeo Racing C39
  - Haas VF-20
- Tipo 065/6 (2021)
  - Ferrari SF21
  - Alfa Romeo Racing C41
  - Haas VF-21
- Tipo 066/7 (2022)
  - Ferrari F1-75
  - Alfa Romeo C42
  - Haas VF-22
- Tipo 066/10 (2023)
  - Ferrari SF-23
  - Alfa Romeo C43
  - Haas VF-23
  - Haas VF-24 (2024)
- Tipo 066/12 (2024)
  - Ferrari SF-24
  - Kick Sauber C44
- Tipo 066/15 (2025)
  - Ferrari SF-25
  - Haas VF-25
  - Kick Sauber C45
- Tipo 067/6 (2026)
  - Ferrari SF-26
  - Haas VF-26
  - Cadillac MAC-26

== Results ==
Constructor	Season(s)	Win(s)	Pole position(s)	Fastest lap(s)	First win	Last win
(Italy) Ferrari	2014–present	28	47	44	2015 Malaysian Grand Prix	2026 British Grand Prix
(Italy) Toro Rosso	2016	0	0	1	—	—
(Switzerland) Sauber	2014–2018, 2024–2025	0	0	2	—	—
(Russia) Marussia	2014–2015	0	0	0	—	—
(United States) Haas	2016–present	0	1	3	—	—
(Switzerland) Alfa Romeo	2019–2023	0	0	2	—	—
(United States) Cadillac	2026–present	0	0	0	—	—
Total	2014–present	27	48	51		

== See also ==
- Audi V6 hybrid Formula One power unit
- Honda V6 hybrid Formula One power unit
- Mercedes V6 hybrid Formula One power unit
- Red Bull Ford V6 hybrid Formula One power unit
- Renault V6 hybrid Formula One power unit
