= Ferrari SF-23 =

2023 Formula One racing car by Ferrari

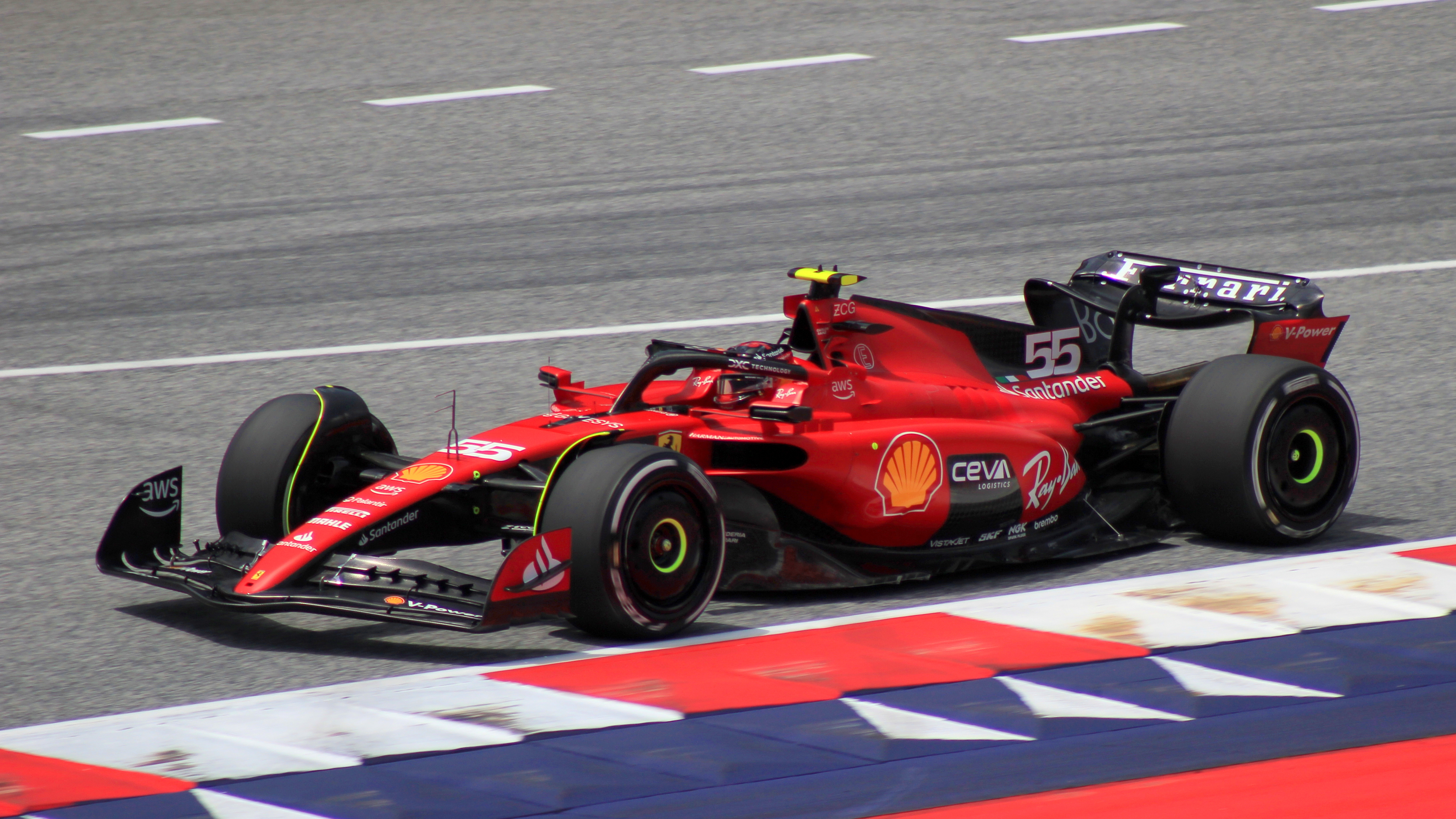
- Carlos Sainz Jr. driving an SF-23 during the Austrian Grand Prix.
- Category: Formula One
- Constructor: Scuderia Ferrari
- Designers: Enrico Cardile (Head Engineer of Chassis Area); David Sanchez (Chief Engineer – Vehicle Concept); Fabio Montecchi (Chief Project Engineer); Enrico Racca (Head of Supply Chain & Manufacturing); Tiziano Battistini (Head of Chassis Design); Marco Adurno (Head of Vehicle Performance); Diego Tondi (Head of Aerodynamic Developments); Thomas Bouché (Head of Aerodynamic Performance); Rory Byrne (Technical Consultant); Enrico Gualtieri (Head of Engine Area)
- Predecessor: Ferrari F1-75
- Successor: Ferrari SF-24

Technical specifications
- Chassis: Carbon fibre composite with survival cell and honeycomb structure
- Suspension (front): Double wishbone push-rod. Öhlins dampers
- Suspension (rear): Double wishbone pull-rod. Öhlins dampers
- Engine: Ferrari 066/10 1.6 L (98 cu in) direct injection V6 turbocharged engine limited to 15,000 RPM in a single-turbocharged rear mid-mounted, rear-wheel drive layout
- Electric motor: Kinetic and thermal energy recovery systems
- Transmission: Ferrari 8 forward + 1 reverse sequential semi-automatic
- Fuel: Shell V-Power Nitro+ Racing 95 RON unleaded 90% + Shell V-Power Ethanol E10 10%
- Lubricants: Shell Helix Ultra and Pennzoil Ultra Platinum (United States races only)
- Brakes: Brembo
- Tyres: Pirelli P Zero (Dry/Slick); Pirelli Cinturato (Wet/Treaded)
- Clutch: Brembo multi-plate

Competition history
- Notable entrants: Scuderia Ferrari
- Notable drivers: 16. (Monaco) Charles Leclerc; 55. (Spain) Carlos Sainz, Jr.
- Debut: 2023 Bahrain Grand Prix
- First win: 2023 Singapore Grand Prix
- Last win: 2023 Singapore Grand Prix
- Last event: 2023 Abu Dhabi Grand Prix
Races	Wins	Podiums	Poles	F/Laps
22	1	9	7	0

The Ferrari SF-23 (also known by its internal name, Project 675) is a Formula One racing car designed and constructed by Scuderia Ferrari that competed in the 2023 Formula One World Championship.

The car was driven by Carlos Sainz Jr. and Charles Leclerc during Grand Prix races. It was the only non-Red Bull Racing car to achieve a victory in the 2023 season, with Sainz winning that year's Singapore Grand Prix.

== Design and development ==
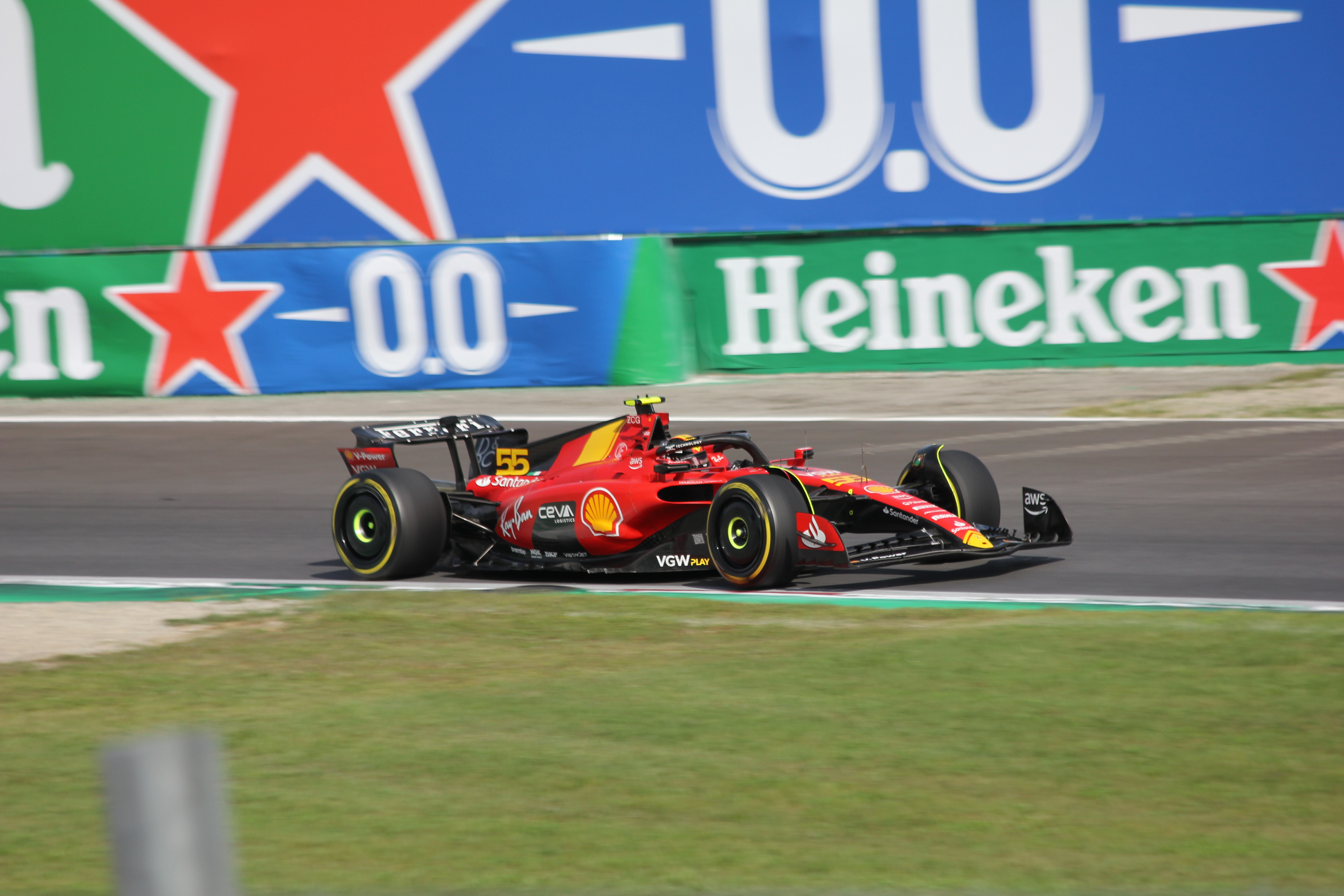
SF-23 with a celebratory livery at Monza

On 22 December 2022, Ferrari announced that the car would be launched on 14 February 2023. The car was revealed as SF-23 on 7 February 2023, a week before the official launch.

Ferrari started the year with an evolution of its 2022 design. However it soon became clear that Ferrari's initial "bathtub style" sidepod aerodynamic concept had started to plateau in terms of its performance and at the Spanish Grand Prix, a major upgrade was introduce changing to sidepods to incorporate a downwash ramp design similar to Red Bull.

As the year progressed Ferrari gain a better understanding of their car with bespoke Monza upgrades improving its pace allowing it to claim pole position and a race win in Singapore.

== Special livery ==
During the Italian Grand Prix, Ferrari unveiled a celebratory livery to celebrate Ferrari's victory in 2023 24 Hours of Le Mans.

During the Las Vegas Grand Prix, Ferrari unveiled a special livery in a nod to the first "golden age" of the sport in the USA where the Scuderia enjoyed some of the most successful moments in its history.

== Later use ==
In January 2025, Lewis Hamilton test drove the SF-23 at the Fiorano Circuit, prior to his move to Ferrari. In November 2025, Sergio Pérez drove a blank-liveried SF-23 in advance of his debut with Ferrari customer Cadillac.

== Complete Formula One results ==
Key

Key
Colour	Result
Gold	Winner
Silver	Second place
Bronze	Third place
Green	Other points position
Blue	Other classified position
Blue	Not classified, finished (NC)
Purple	Not classified, retired (Ret)
Red	Did not qualify (DNQ)
Black	Disqualified (DSQ)
White	Did not start (DNS)
White	Race cancelled (C)
Blank	Did not practice (DNP)
Blank	Excluded (EX)
Blank	Did not arrive (DNA)
Blank	Withdrawn (WD)
Blank	Did not enter (empty cell)
Annotation	Meaning
P	Pole position
F	Fastest lap
Superscript number	Points-scoring position in sprint

Year	Entrant	Power unit	Tyres	Driver name	Grands Prix																						Points	WCC pos.
Year	Entrant	Power unit	Tyres	Driver name	BHR	SAU	AUS	AZE	MIA	MON	ESP	CAN	AUT	GBR	HUN	BEL	NED	ITA	SIN	JPN	QAT	USA	MXC	SAP	LVG	ABU	Points	WCC pos.
2023	Scuderia Ferrari	Ferrari 066/10	P	(Monaco) Charles Leclerc	Ret	7	Ret	3^{P 2}	7	6	11	4	2	9	7	3^{P 5}	Ret	4	4	4	5	DSQ^{P 3}	3^{P}	DNS^{5}	2^{P}	2	406	3rd
2023	Scuderia Ferrari	Ferrari 066/10	P	(Spain) Carlos Sainz Jr.	4	6	12	5^{5}	5	8	5	5	6^{3}	10	8	Ret^{4}	5	3^{P}	1^{P}	6	DNS^{6}	3^{6}	4	6^{8}	6	18†	406	3rd
