= Ferrari SF-24 =

2024 Formula One car

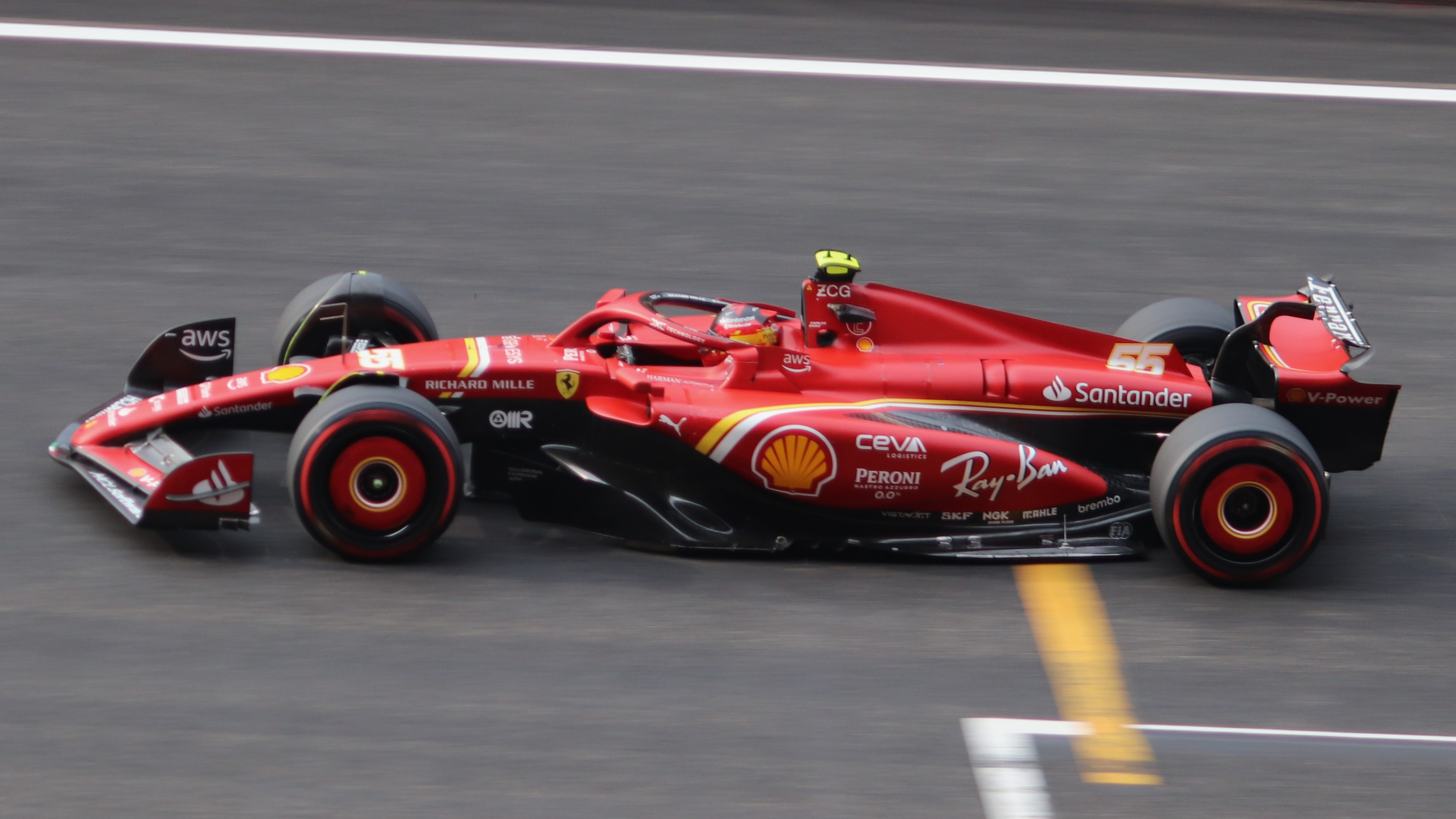
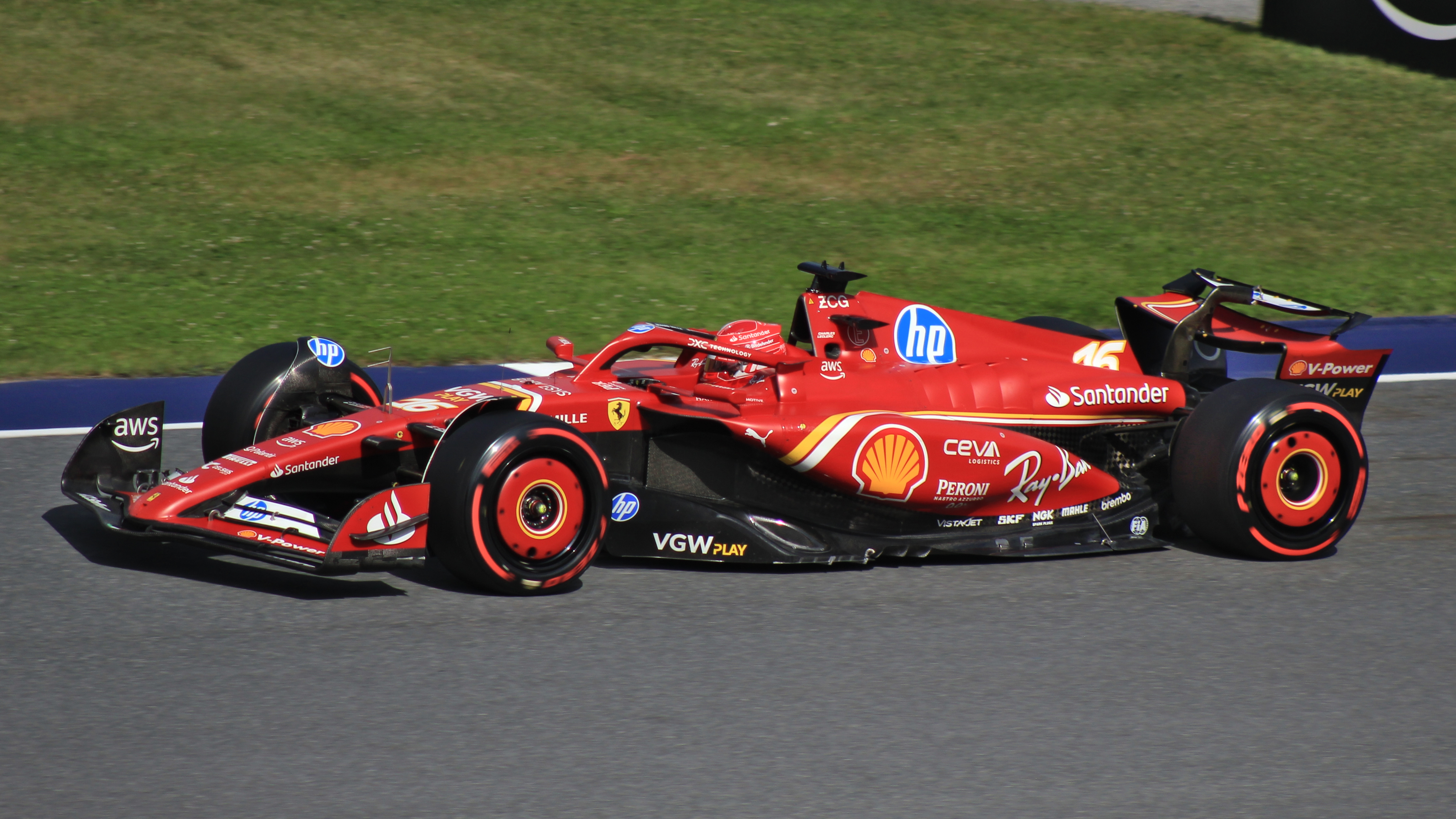
- The SF-24, driven by Carlos Sainz Jr. (top, in its original livery) during qualifying at the Chinese Grand Prix and Charles Leclerc (bottom, in its updated livery with HP branding) at the Austrian Grand Prix
- Category: Formula One
- Constructor: Scuderia Ferrari
- Designers: Enrico Cardile (Technical Director – Chassis); Fabio Montecchi (Chief Project Engineer); Enrico Racca (Head of Supply Chain & Manufacturing); Tiziano Battistini (Head of Chassis Design); Marco Adurno (Head of Vehicle Performance); Diego Tondi (Head of Aerodynamic Developments); Thomas Bouché (Head of Aerodynamic Performance); Rory Byrne (Technical Consultant); Enrico Gualtieri (Technical Director - Power Unit)
- Predecessor: Ferrari SF-23
- Successor: Ferrari SF-25

Technical specifications
- Chassis: Carbon fibre composite with survival cell and honeycomb structure
- Suspension (front): Double wishbone push-rod
- Suspension (rear): Double wishbone pull-rod
- Engine: Ferrari 066/12 1.6 L (98 cu in) direct injection V6 turbocharged engine limited to 15,000 RPM in a mid-mounted, rear-wheel drive layout 1.6 L (98 cu in) Turbo Rear-mid mounted
- Electric motor: Kinetic and thermal energy recovery systems
- Transmission: 8 forward + 1 reverse
- Fuel: Shell V-Power
- Lubricants: Shell Helix Ultra
- Tyres: Pirelli P Zero (Dry/Slick); Pirelli Cinturato (Wet/Treaded)

Competition history
- Notable entrants: Scuderia Ferrari
- Notable drivers: 16. (Monaco) Charles Leclerc; 55. (Spain) Carlos Sainz, Jr.; 38. (United Kingdom) Oliver Bearman
- Debut: 2024 Bahrain Grand Prix
- First win: 2024 Australian Grand Prix
- Last win: 2024 Mexico City Grand Prix
- Last event: 2024 Abu Dhabi Grand Prix
Races	Wins	Podiums	Poles	F/Laps
24	5	22	4	4

The Ferrari SF-24 (also known by its internal name, Project 676) is a Formula One racing car designed and constructed by Scuderia Ferrari which competed in the 2024 Formula One World Championship. It was driven by Carlos Sainz Jr. and Charles Leclerc, the former in his final season with the team, with reserve driver Oliver Bearman replacing Sainz for the Saudi Arabian Grand Prix due to the former needing emergency surgery for appendicitis.

Making its competitive debut at the Bahrain Grand Prix, the SF-24 holds five victories: Leclerc won the Monaco and Italian Grands Prix, Sainz won the Mexico City Grand Prix, and the car was involved in two 1–2 finishes: one with a returning Sainz at the Australian Grand Prix, and one with Leclerc at the United States Grand Prix. This car has achieved twenty-two podiums, four pole positions, and it holds four fastest laps.

== Competitive history ==
The SF-24 made its competitive debut in the Bahrain Grand Prix where Carlos Sainz Jr. secured the team's first podium of the season finishing in third. Charles Leclerc, who qualified in second, finished the race in fourth after suffering from a brake issue throughout the race. For the Saudi Arabian Grand Prix, Sainz was withdrawn for the rest of the weekend after falling ill. He was required to undergo surgery for appendicitis; replacing him was Ferrari reserve driver Oliver Bearman, who qualified eleventh and finished seventh. Leclerc, meanwhile, qualified in second and finished in third after Sergio Pérez overtook him earlier in the race.

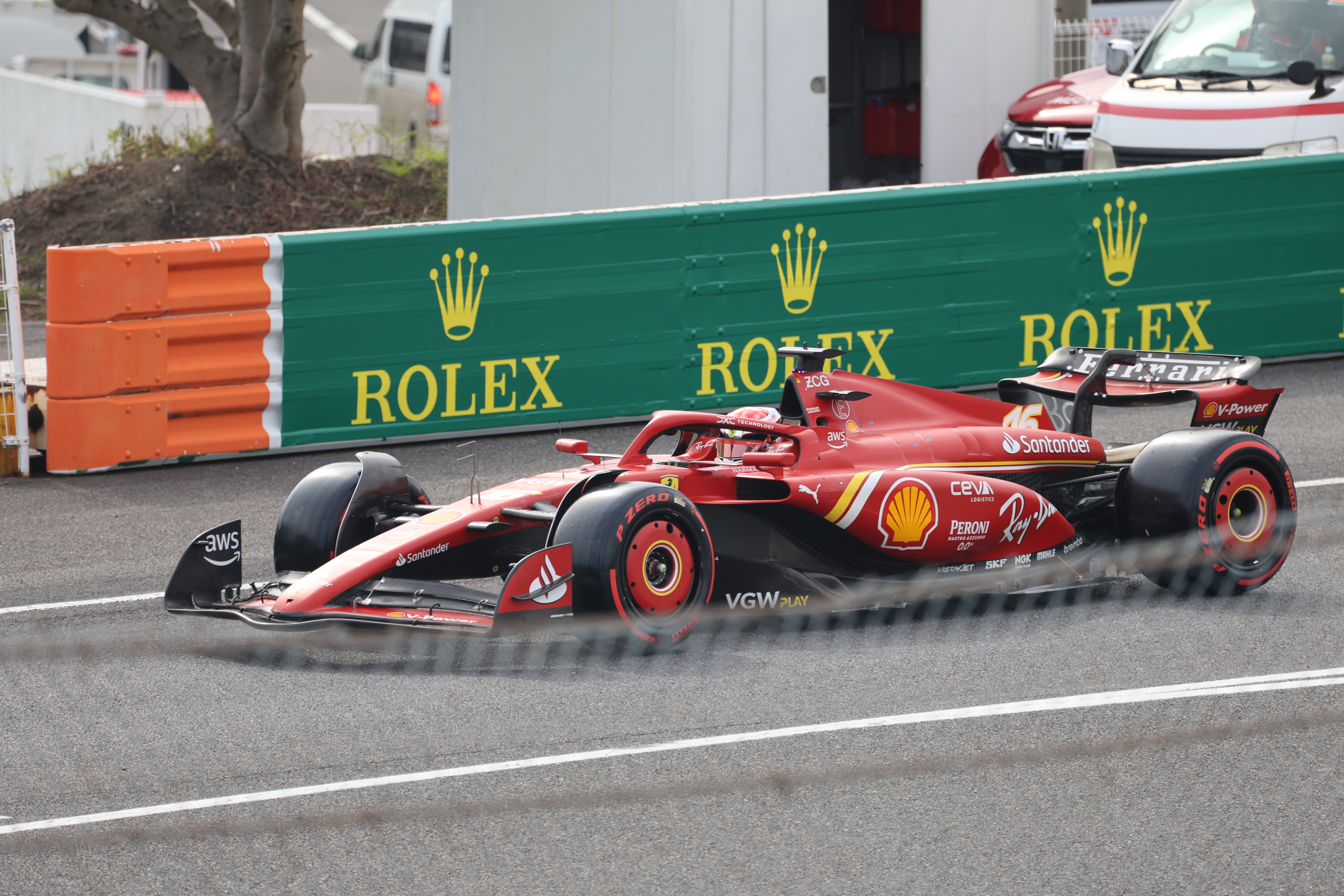
Leclerc driving the SF-24 at the Japanese Grand Prix.

During the Australian Grand Prix, Sainz returned to race again after recovering for two weeks, and qualified 2nd. His team-mate, Leclerc, qualified 5th on the road, but was promoted to 4th on the grid, following a 3-place grid penalty for Sergio Pérez. Throughout qualifying, the Ferraris were pressuring Red Bull for pole. In the race itself, Sainz overtook pole sitter Max Verstappen on lap 2 for the lead, with the latter retiring due to brake failure on lap 4, his first retirement since the race's 2022 edition. Sainz led home team-mate Leclerc to win the Grand Prix, giving Ferrari and himself their first victory in 2024, as well as the team's first 1-2 finish since the 2022 Bahrain Grand Prix. Leclerc secured the point for fastest lap. The race finished under the safety car following a last lap accident by George Russell, driving for Mercedes.

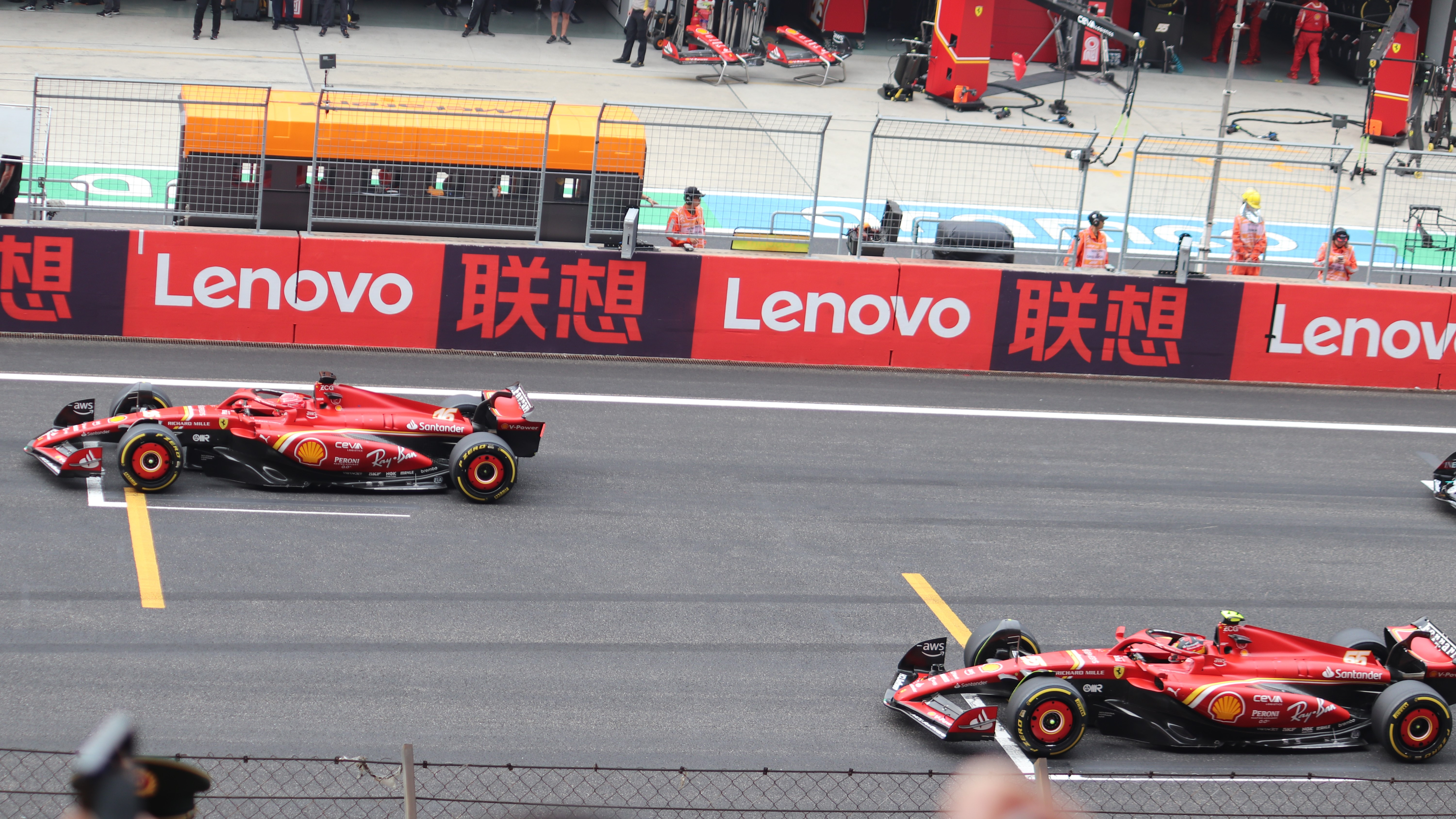
Leclerc and Sainz on the grid at the Chinese Grand Prix.

For the Japanese Grand Prix, Sainz started 4th on the grid with team-mate Leclerc starting 8th. Ferrari were experimenting with a varied strategy with Sainz on a two-stop strategy with Leclerc on a one-stop strategy. Leclerc conserved his tyres brilliantly throughout his one stop strategy, on his way to finish in fourth. Sainz finished in third place, whilst slowly catching Sergio Pérez, who finished in second, in the last laps of the race. In the run-up to the Miami Grand Prix, the team gained a title sponsor in computer company HP, facilitating an updated livery with HP branding. The HP branding was introduced in a one-off livery for the race featuring "Azzurro La Plata" and "Azzurro Dino", marking Ferrari's 70th anniversary in the United States, and was applied to the base livery in the following race at the Emilia Romagna Grand Prix, where the team also introduced an upgrade. Leclerc finished on the podium in both races and won the Monaco Grand Prix, Ferrari's first victory in Monaco since 2017 and his first race win since 2022. However, the team suffered a double retirement at the following race in Canada - Leclerc suffering engine issues and Sainz hitting Alex Albon.

Leclerc won the Italian Grand Prix after completing a one-stop strategy, Ferrari's first victory at Monza since 2019. At the following race, Sainz and Pérez were battling for a podium until lap 50 of 51, when the pair collided, while Leclerc finished second after qualifying on pole.

At the United States Grand Prix, Sainz finished 2nd in the sprint race with Leclerc finishing 4th. In the race, Leclerc was able to avoid a scrap between Max Verstappen and Lando Norris on Lap 1, and moved into first from a start of 4th on the grid. He would bring home his 3rd victory of the 2024 with Sainz finishing 2nd. This was the 2nd Ferrari 1-2 of the season and Ferrari's first win at COTA since Kimi Raikkonen's win in 2018. For the Mexican Grand Prix, Sainz secured pole ahead of Max Verstappen. During the race, Sainz briefly lost the lead to Verstappen at the start but was able to overtake and lead for the remainder of the race for his 2nd win of the season. Leclerc also reached the podium, finishing in 3rd place and securing a point for fastest lap. This was Ferrari's first win at Hermanos Rodríguez since Alain Prost's win in 1990.

== Sponsorship and livery ==
The livery of the SF-24 differs from that of the two previous single-seaters, while still maintaining the red base: the yellow and white details along the sidepods and in front of the cockpit are new, as are the front and rear wings which now feature a red element, unlike the exposed carbon of previous seasons; the rear wing, however, confirms the presence of the "Ferrari" lettering with the "long F", following on from what was already done with the SF-23.

For the Saudi Arabian Grand Prix, the Peroni logo was replaced with "TIFOSI 0.0" and Qatar Grand Prix "ITALIA 0.0" due to regulations regarding alcohol sponsorship in the country.

During the Miami Grand Prix, to celebrate the seventieth anniversary of Ferrari's presence in the North American market, the SF-24 is adorned with a livery with details in "Azzurro La Plata" and "Azzurro Dino", two historic shades of blue for the brand. Furthermore, starting from this race, the "Ferrari" lettering with the "long F" on the rear wing is replaced by the logos of the new title sponsor HP.

During the Italian Grand Prix weekend, the SF-24 presents itself with a special livery inspired by carbon fibre: the inside of Leclerc and Sainz's racing numbers, in fact, changes from the usual white to black, also recalling the colour already adopted with the F1-75.

== Complete Formula One results ==
Key

Key
Colour	Result
Gold	Winner
Silver	Second place
Bronze	Third place
Green	Other points position
Blue	Other classified position
Blue	Not classified, finished (NC)
Purple	Not classified, retired (Ret)
Red	Did not qualify (DNQ)
Black	Disqualified (DSQ)
White	Did not start (DNS)
White	Race cancelled (C)
Blank	Did not practice (DNP)
Blank	Excluded (EX)
Blank	Did not arrive (DNA)
Blank	Withdrawn (WD)
Blank	Did not enter (empty cell)
Annotation	Meaning
P	Pole position
F	Fastest lap
Superscript number	Points-scoring position in sprint

Year	Entrant	Power unit	Tyres	Driver name	Grands Prix																								Points	WCC pos.
Year	Entrant	Power unit	Tyres	Driver name	BHR	SAU	AUS	JPN	CHN	MIA	EMI	MON	CAN	ESP	AUT	GBR	HUN	BEL	NED	ITA	AZE	SIN	USA	MXC	SAP	LVG	QAT	ABU	Points	WCC pos.
2024	Scuderia Ferrari	Ferrari 066/12	P	(Monaco) Charles Leclerc	4	3^{F}	2^{F}	4	4^{4}	3^{2}	3	1^{P}	Ret	5	11^{7}	14	4	3^{P}	3	1	2^{P}	5	1^{4}	3^{F}	5^{3}	4	2^{5}	3	652	2nd
2024	Scuderia Ferrari	Ferrari 066/12	P	(Spain) Carlos Sainz Jr.	3	WD	1	3	5^{5}	5^{5}	5	3	Ret	6	3^{5}	5^{F}	6	6	5	4	18†	7	2^{2}	1^{P}	Ret^{5}	3	6^{4}	2	652	2nd
2024	Scuderia Ferrari	Ferrari 066/12	P	(United Kingdom) Oliver Bearman		7																							652	2nd
