= Ferrari SF21 =

2021 Formula One racing car by Ferrari

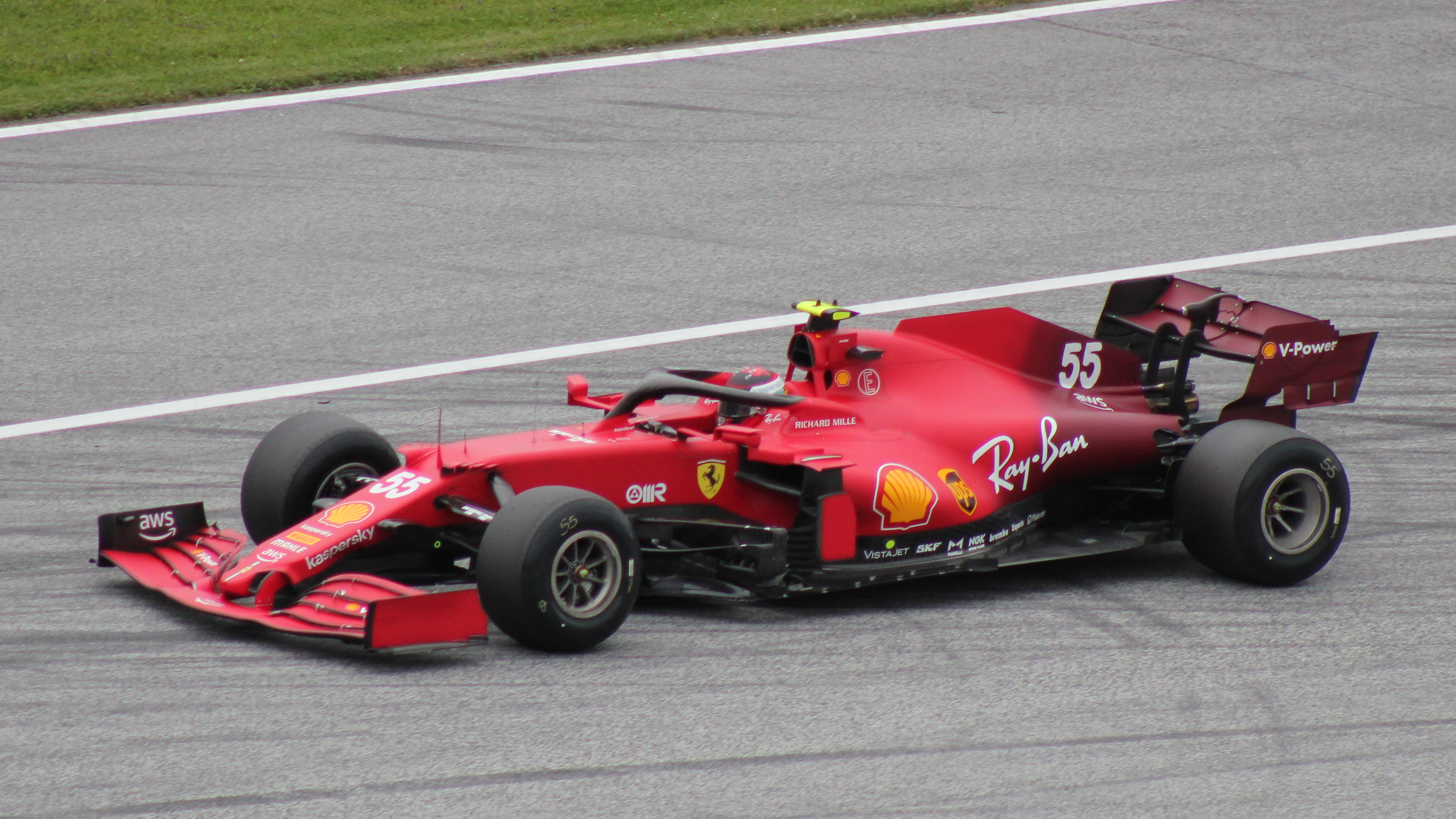
- Carlos Sainz in the SF21 during practice at the Austrian Grand Prix.
- Category: Formula One
- Constructor: Ferrari
- Designers: Enrico Cardile (Head of Chassis Area); Corrado Onorato (Deputy Chief Designer); Fabio Montecchi (Chief Project Engineer); Tiziano Battistini (Head of Chassis Design); Marco Adurno (Head of Vehicle Performance); David Sanchez (Head of Aerodynamics); Enrico Gualtieri (Head of Engine Area)
- Predecessor: Ferrari SF1000
- Successor: Ferrari F1-75

Technical specifications
- Chassis: Carbon fibre and honeycomb composite with halo protection device around the cockpit
- Suspension (front): Push-rod
- Suspension (rear): Pull-rod
- Engine: Ferrari 065/6 1.6 L (98 cu in) Direct injection turbocharged 90° V6 engine limited to 15,000 rpm longitudinal mid-mounted, rear-wheel drive layout
- Electric motor: Ferrari kinetic and thermal energy recovery systems
- Transmission: 8 forward gears and 1 reverse gear Longitudinal Rear differential with hydraulic torque converter
- Battery: 4 MJ lithium-ion batteries of minimum 20 kg weight
- Fuel: Shell V-Power
- Lubricants: Shell Helix Ultra
- Tyres: Pirelli

Competition history
- Notable entrants: Scuderia Ferrari Mission Winnow (Note: Ferrari entered round 1 as "Scuderia Mission Winnow Ferrari", rounds 2–6, 15, 17–22 as "Scuderia Ferrari Mission Winnow", and rounds 7–14, 16 as "Scuderia Ferrari".)
- Notable drivers: 16. (Monaco) Charles Leclerc; 55. (Spain) Carlos Sainz, Jr.
- Debut: 2021 Bahrain Grand Prix
- Last event: 2021 Abu Dhabi Grand Prix
Races	Wins	Podiums	Poles	F/Laps
22	0	5	2	0

The Ferrari SF21 (also known by its internal name, Project 673) was a Formula One racing car designed and constructed by Scuderia Ferrari to compete in the 2021 Formula One World Championship. The car was driven by Ferrari debutant Carlos Sainz Jr. and Charles Leclerc. The car made its competitive debut at the 2021 Bahrain Grand Prix.

== Background ==
=== Name ===
Ferrari used the naming scheme of "SF" (Scuderia Ferrari's initials) and the year of competition for the first time since the SF16-H. It would reused again (with a dash) for the SF-23.

=== Chassis ===
The SF21 was designed as an evolution of its predecessor the SF1000.

Head of Chassis Enrico Cardile said that the aerodynamics on the SF21 underwent a "radical" revision with two goals in mind given the 2021 rules cut downforce around the car's floor and rear wheels. As a result, that the team's development tokens were spent on the transmission and rear suspension.

The entire front section of the car underwent refinements, with the new front-wing returning to a 2019-style emphasis on the outwash effect. It also featured a new lateral drift, both for the shape of the bulkhead in the outermost edge, and in the foot curb area with a small flow diverter in front of the tyre. There was also a new cape (the flow diverter located behind the nose which helps to manage the flow of air that passes through the lower part of the frame). Additionally, the aerodynamic "horns" placed in the front part of the frame, featured four separate flow diverters.

Development of the car ended after the Azerbaijan Grand Prix as Ferrari switched their attention to the car's successor.

=== Power unit ===
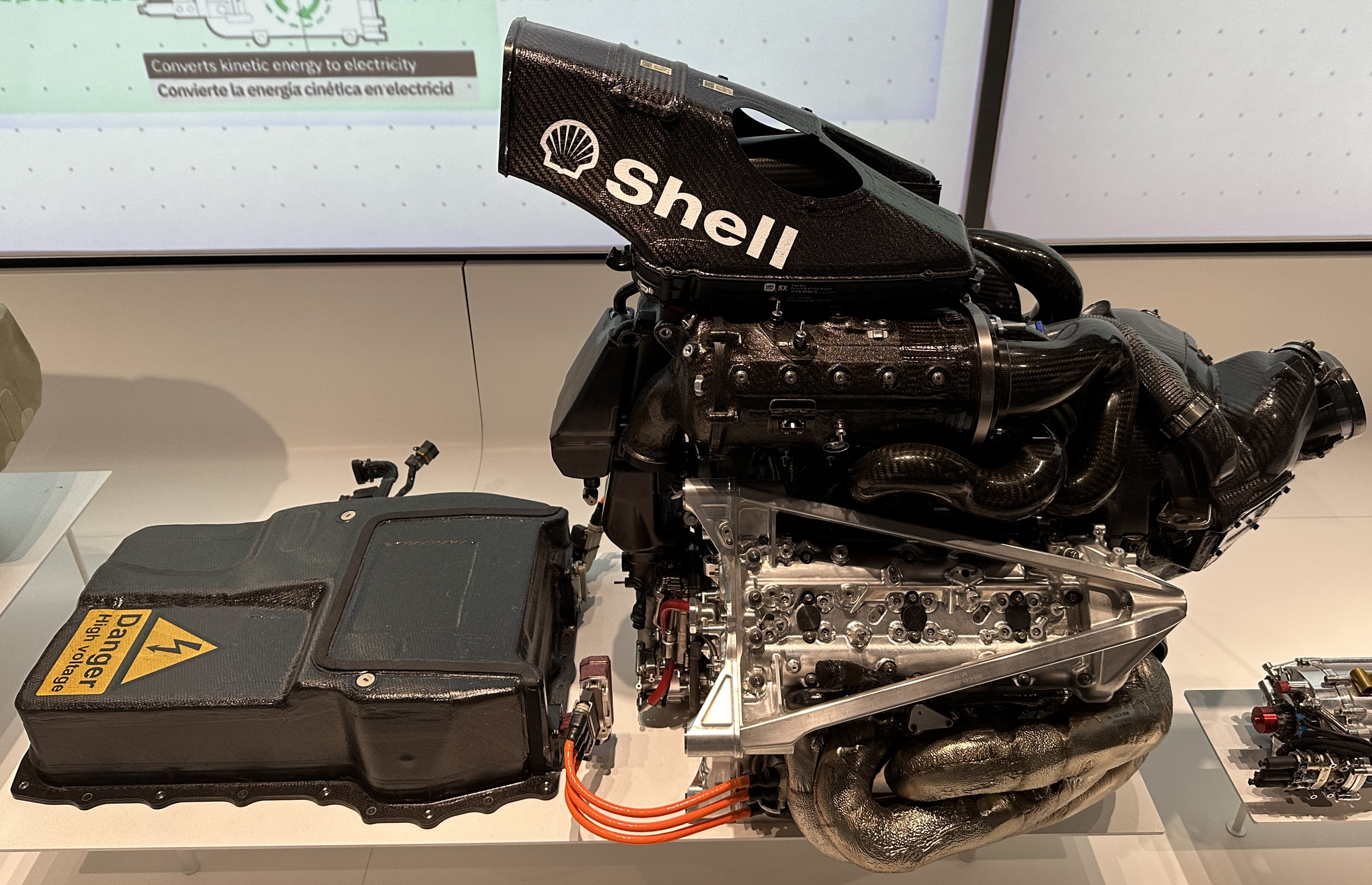
The Ferrari 065/6 internal combustion engine and its energy storage unit, pictured on display in 2023.

Addressing the power deficit of their 2020 contender, Mattia Binotto stated that "the [new] engine is running well on the dyno" and that its performance had progressed "significantly" compared to 2020. He also explained that 2021 will be a "transition" year in preparation for 2022 and that the SF1000's high aerodynamic drag is a point of focus for development.

In an August 2021 interview, Binotto announced that there would be an additional development to the power unit targeted towards the latter stages of the season.

At the Russian Grand Prix Ferrari introduced its new hybrid system, installing it into Charles Leclerc's car with Carlos Sainz receiving his power unit next at the Turkish Grand Prix.

The change was to the energy store, upgrading from a 400 V to an 800 V system, in line with its rivals by increasing the energy density of the batteries. Binotto told The Race that "The power is always available through the straight line, so you get the benefit from it at the start of the straight line but as well at the end. If we consider how the situation was last year, it is certainly a big step forward. So we still know that there is a gap to the best engine today, but we believe that gap today is not so dramatic."

== Competition history ==
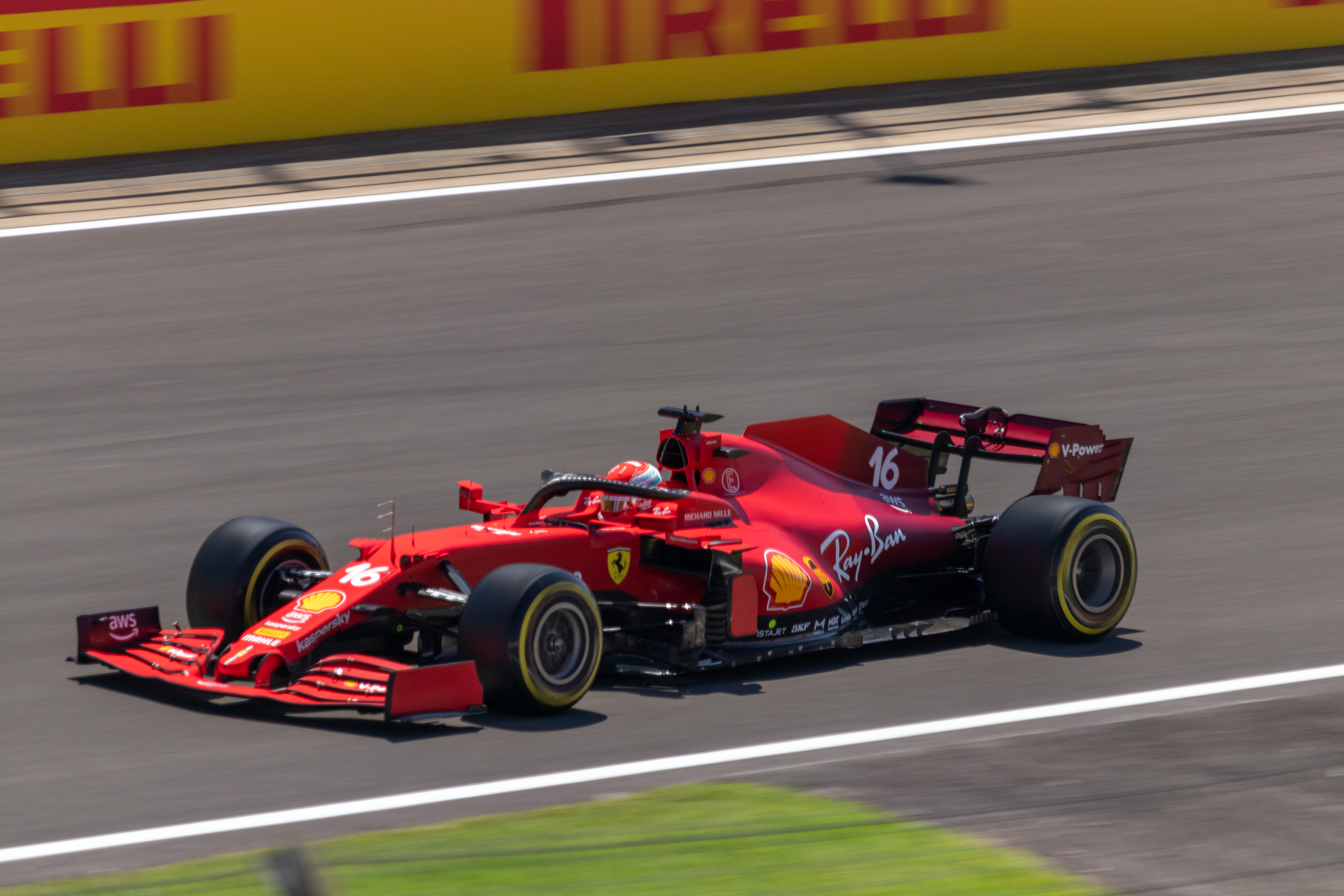
Leclerc during the British Grand Prix, where he finished second.

Ferrari had a much-improved season relative to its disastrous 2020 campaign with the SF1000, with Leclerc achieving 2 pole positions in Monaco and Azerbaijan. The improvement in performance from the SF21 helped Ferrari to secure 3rd in the constructors standings, compared to the disappointing 6th in 2020. Despite this improvement, Ferrari would end the season winless, marking the first time since 1992 and 1993 that they were winless in consecutive seasons. The SF21 came closest to victory at the British Grand Prix, where Leclerc was 2 laps away from taking the win before being overtaken by Lewis Hamilton at Copse corner on lap 50 of 52.

== Complete Formula One results ==
(key)

Year	Entrant	Power unit	Tyres	Driver name	Grands Prix																						Points	WCC pos.
Year	Entrant	Power unit	Tyres	Driver name	BHR	EMI	POR	ESP	MON	AZE	FRA	STY	AUT	GBR	HUN	BEL^{‡}	NED	ITA	RUS	TUR	USA	MXC	SAP	QAT	SAU	ABU	Points	WCC pos.
2021	Scuderia Ferrari Mission Winnow	Ferrari 065/6	P	(Monaco) Charles Leclerc	6	4	6	4	DNS^{P}	4^{P}	16	7	8	2	Ret	8	5	4	15	4	4	5	5	8	7	10	323.5	3rd
2021	Scuderia Ferrari Mission Winnow	Ferrari 065/6	P	(Spain) Carlos Sainz Jr.	8	5	11	7	2	8	11	6	5	6	3	10	7	6	3	8	7	6	6^{3}	7	8	3	323.5	3rd

Notes

^{‡} Half points awarded as less than 75% of race distance completed.
