= Montecchi =

Montecchi can refer to:

- Italian noble family, see Characters in Romeo and Juliet#House of Montague
- Fabio Montecchi, Formula One engineer
- Montecchi Glacier, Antarctic glacier
