= Ferrari SF1000 =

2020-21 Ferrari Formula One car

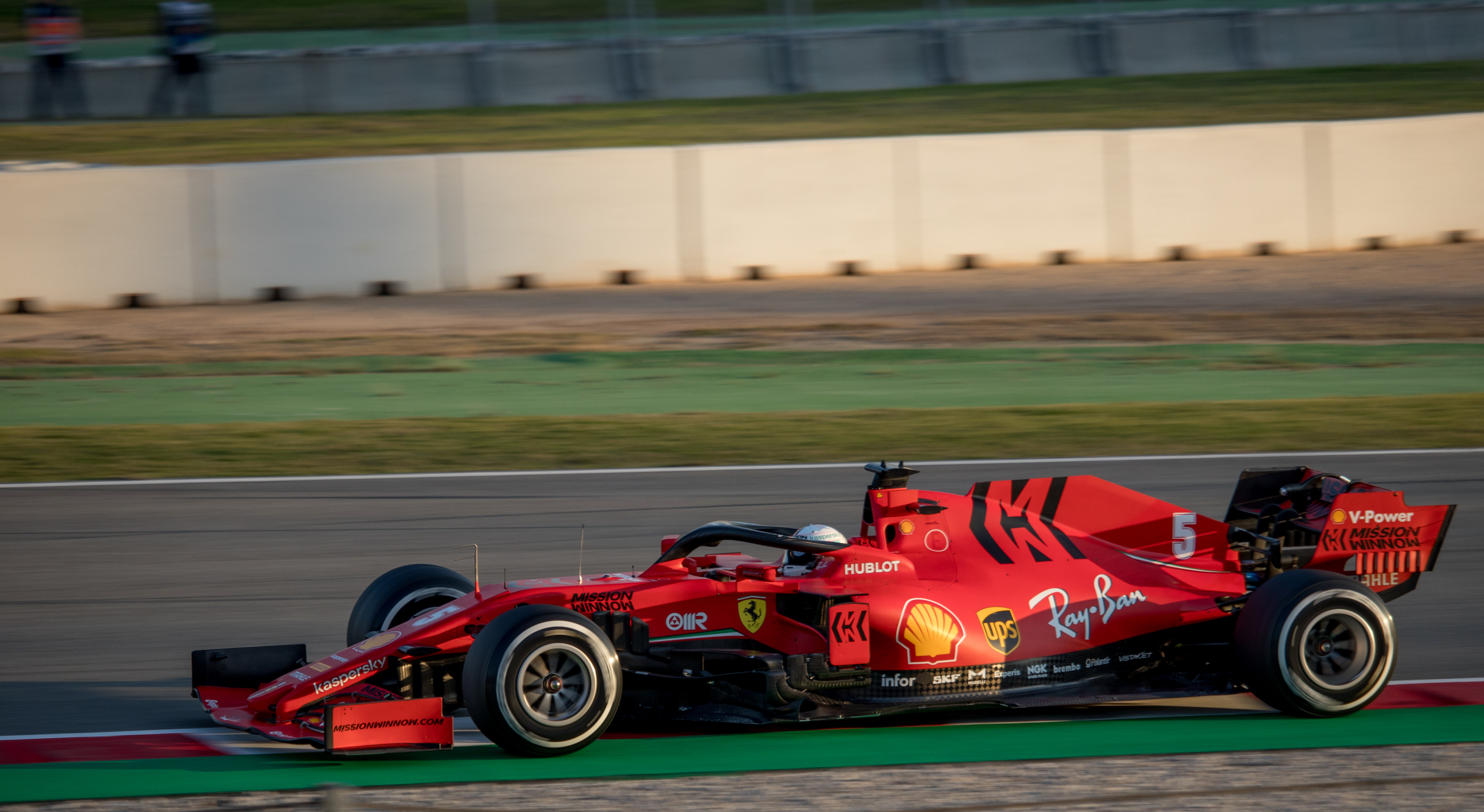
- An SF1000 driven by Sebastian Vettel during the 2020 Formula One pre-season testing.
- Category: Formula One
- Constructor: Ferrari
- Designers: Simone Resta (Head of Chassis Engineering); Enrico Cardile (Head of Performance Development); Fabio Montecchi (Vehicle Project Manager); Andrea De Zordo (Vehicle Project Manager); Corrado Onorato (Deputy Chief Designer); Tiziano Battistini (Head of Chassis Design); Giorgio Rossetti (Head of Development); Maurzio Bocchi (Head of Vehicle Performance); David Sanchez (Head of Aerodynamics); Enrico Gualtieri (Head of Engine Area)
- Predecessor: Ferrari SF90
- Successor: Ferrari SF21

Technical specifications
- Chassis: Carbon fibre and honeycomb composite chassis, with halo fitted to the cockpit
- Suspension (front): Push-rod
- Suspension (rear): Pull-rod
- Engine: Ferrari 065 1.6 L (98 cu in) V6 90°
- Fuel: Shell V-Power
- Lubricants: Shell Helix Ultra
- Tyres: Pirelli

Competition history
- Notable entrants: Scuderia Ferrari
- Notable drivers: 5. (Germany) Sebastian Vettel; 16. (Monaco) Charles Leclerc
- Debut: 2020 Austrian Grand Prix
- Last event: 2020 Abu Dhabi Grand Prix
| Races | Wins | Podiums | Poles | F/Laps |
|---|---|---|---|---|
| 17 | 0 | 3 | 0 | 0 |

The Ferrari SF1000 (also known by its internal name, Project 671) is a Formula One racing car designed and constructed by Scuderia Ferrari, which competed in the 2020 Formula One World Championship.

The SF1000 was driven by Sebastian Vettel and Charles Leclerc in 2020. The car was planned to make its competitive debut at the 2020 Australian Grand Prix. However, this was delayed when the race was called off due to the COVID-19 pandemic, and the next nine events were either postponed or cancelled as well. The SF1000 ultimately made its debut at the 2020 Austrian Grand Prix.

== Background ==
=== Naming ===
The car's designation "SF1000" refers to Ferrari's one thousandth Grand Prix entry, which was originally due to occur at the 2020 Monaco Grand Prix, however, due to the cancellation and postponement of several races its 1000th race was at the 2020 Tuscan Grand Prix. Sebastian Vettel continued his tradition of naming his cars, this time calling it "Lucilla".

=== Initial design ===
As a consequence of the technical regulations being largely unchanged for the 2020 season, the SF1000 was designed as an evolution of its predecessor the SF90, with team principal Mattia Binotto stating: "The starting point for this car was the SF90 but we have been extreme with all the concepts as much as we could".

The SF1000's centre of gravity was lowered through lowering elements of its cooling system. The initial release of the car showed that it also featured narrower sidepod inlets, tighter rear bodywork and more complex bargeboard components.

=== Power unit ===
Following the 2019 season, the FIA launched an investigation into Ferrari's power unit following claims that it had violated the technical regulations' provisions on fuel flow restrictions. The investigation concluded with no penalty being given to Ferrari as no case could be proven. However, the FIA tightened the fuel flow provisions for the 2020 season and introduced a second fuel flow sensor. The SF1000 was slower for the 2020 season, with GPS analysis suggesting that it had lost 65 bhp (48 kW) in comparison to the SF90.

== 2020 season ==
Prior to the start of the delayed 2020 season, Binotto revealed that for the Austrian Grand Prix the team would use the same configuration of the SF1000 that appeared in pre-season testing. He also stated that "at the moment, we don’t have the fastest package" and that the team would introduce a major update for the third race in Hungary.

=== Opening rounds ===
At the first race, the Austrian Grand Prix, Leclerc and Vettel could only qualify seventh and 11th respectively, with Ferrari CEO Louis Camilleri remarking that it was "clear that we have to improve on all fronts." During the race, Leclerc took advantage of the retirements of both Red Bulls and a time penalty for Lewis Hamilton to finish an unexpected second, whereas Vettel finished 10th having spun during an overtake attempt. Vettel stated he was "happy that [he] spun only once" and that the car was very difficult to drive.

The team brought forward some of their planned updates to the Styrian Grand Prix, however the SF1000 did not fare much better in the rain-affected qualifying session with Vettel and Leclerc qualifying only 10th and 11th respectively. Leclerc was later demoted three places on the grid for impeding another driver during the session. Both drivers were then eliminated from the race on the first lap after Leclerc collided against Vettel. Vettel noted that racing on the same circuit on consecutive weekends would have provided the team with an opportunity to test and compare the SF1000's new upgrades, but that the collision made this impossible.

Vettel and Leclerc qualified fifth and sixth respectively for the Hungarian Grand Prix. This was the first time in 2020 that both Ferraris had reached the third qualifying session, albeit qualifying over 1.3 seconds behind pole-sitter Hamilton and behind both Racing Point cars. Vettel finished sixth having recovered from a slow pit stop, however Leclerc finished outside the points in 11th after being passed by the McLaren of Carlos Sainz Jr. in the closing laps. Leclerc remarked that the car was "extremely hard to drive" and was confused by the drop in performance after a "better than expected" qualifying session. After the race, Binotto admitted that "the entire car project has to be revised".

Both cars reached Q3 again at the British Grand Prix, with Vettel qualifying 10th and Leclerc achieving the SF1000's best qualifying result thus far with fourth. Leclerc maintained his position during the race until he was elevated to the podium in the closing laps after the Mercedes of Valtteri Bottas suffered a tyre failure, an incident that also promoted Vettel to 10th after he had been running outside the points positions. Leclerc later described his podium finish as "lucky". At the following weekend's 70th Anniversary Grand Prix, Leclerc and Vettel qualified eighth and 12th respectively. Whilst most drivers made two pit stops during the race, Leclerc took advantage of a one-stop strategy to finish fourth, a result he described as "like a victory". Vettel, meanwhile, spun on the opening lap and remarked that his two-stop tyre strategy "didn't make any sense" after finishing in 12th place.

=== Mid-season ===
Leclerc and Vettel qualified ninth and 11th respectively for the Spanish Grand Prix. Leclerc retired from the race with an ECU issue, whereas Vettel took advantage of an "unplanned" one-stop strategy to hold onto seventh place in the closing laps. The SF1000 struggled at the Belgian Grand Prix; neither car reached Q3 for the first time in 2020, with Leclerc and Vettel qualifying only 13th and 14th respectively. Leclerc's SF1000 was 10 km/h (6.2 mph) slower through the circuit's speed trap than his predecessor SF90 was a year prior, and Ferrari were the only team not to improve on their 2019 qualifying time. Vettel finished the race 13th and Leclerc 14th, at a circuit where the SF90 had taken pole position and victory. Binotto commented that the team was "disappointed and angry" with its poor performance, judged to be due to a lack of aerodynamic efficiency, power and tyre grip.

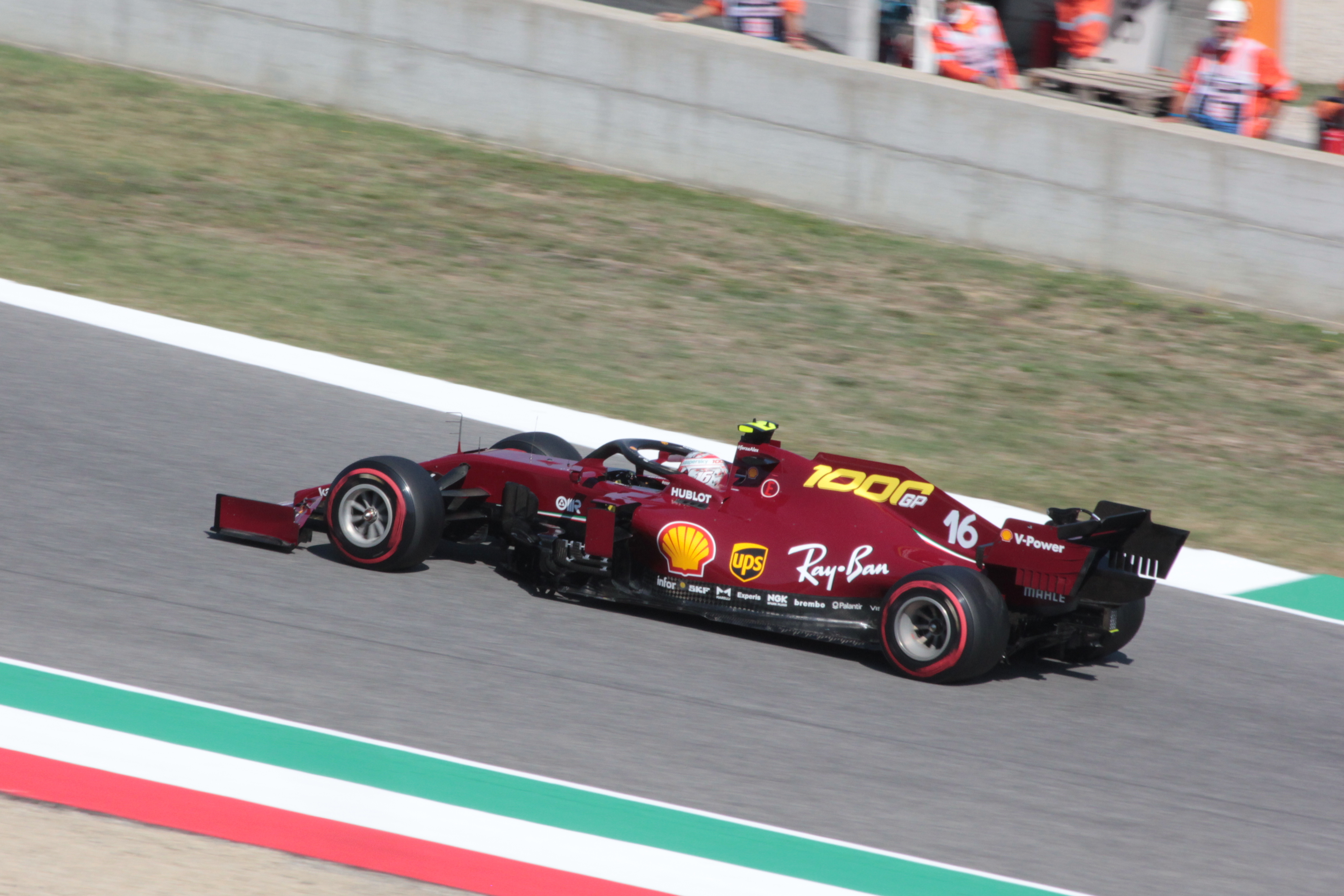
The Ferrari SF1000 in a one off livery during their 1000th Grand Prix entry

At the Scuderia home race at Monza, the SF1000 failed to reach Q2 for the first time with Vettel qualifying 17th after being caught in traffic. Leclerc could qualify only 13th. Vettel suffered a brake failure in the early laps and retired from the race. Leclerc was running in fourth place before suffering a high-speed accident at the final corner, bringing out the red flag and resulting in Ferrari's second double-retirement of the season. Vettel later remarked that it was "a blessing" that no fans were in attendance, and that expectations were "very low" for the following race at Mugello. To mark the team's 1000th Grand Prix at the Tuscan Grand Prix, the SF1000 appeared in a burgundy livery in honour of Ferrari's first racing car, the 125 S. Vettel qualified 14th and Leclerc fifth, with Leclerc commenting that his result was "above any of our expectations". Eight retirements in the race allowed Vettel to claim a point in 10th, whereas Leclerc dropped back to ninth behind the Ferrari-customer Alfa Romeo of Kimi Räikkönen, before being elevated to eighth after Räikkönen received a penalty.

The SF1000 received minor upgrades for the Russian Grand Prix, however Binotto cautioned that they would "not change the big picture". Both cars failed to reach Q3, with Leclerc and Vettel qualifying 11th and 15th respectively. Vettel could only finish 13th, whereas Leclerc made up places to finish sixth. Leclerc described the upgrades as having "gone in the right direction", although Binotto claimed that the result was more due to the characteristics of the Sochi Autodrom. Ferrari brought upgrades to the Eifel Grand Prix, primarily focused on the SF1000's diffuser. Leclerc matched the SF1000's best qualifying result with fourth and finished the race in seventh, whereas Vettel qualified and finished 11th. The team again brought upgrades to the diffuser for the Portuguese Grand Prix, stating that their aim was to qualify in the top six at the remaining six races of the season. Leclerc achieved this at Portimão by again qualifying fourth, however Vettel was far behind in 15th, remarking that despite his best efforts, Leclerc was "in another league". Leclerc fell behind at the start of the race but recovered to finish fourth and Vettel was able to claim a point with 10th place.

=== Closing rounds ===
Leclerc and Vettel qualified seventh and 14th respectively for the Emilia Romagna Grand Prix. Leclerc had run in fourth place late in the race, however he was passed by the AlphaTauri of Daniil Kvyat, who had stopped for fresh soft-compound tyres during a late safety car. Leclerc later suggested that a podium finish could have been possible with a different strategy. Vettel's race was hampered by a collision with Kevin Magnussen on the opening lap, followed by a slow pit stop later in the race. He crossed the finish line in 12th place. Both cars failed to reach Q3 at the Turkish Grand Prix, with Vettel qualifying 12th and Leclerc 14th. Vettel made multiple overtakes at the race start, climbing from 11th to third place before the end of the first lap. On the final lap, Leclerc and Vettel were running in third and fourth place respectively. Leclerc made a mistake whilst attempting to overtake second-placed Sergio Pérez, allowing Vettel through to claim his first podium finish of the season.

In contrast to the team's best combined result of the year at the Turkish Grand Prix, the SF1000 collected only a single point over the final three races of the season. Both cars again failed to reach Q3 at the Bahrain Grand Prix, with Vettel qualifying 11th and Leclerc 12th. After qualifying, Ferrari's sporting director Laurent Mekies suggested that Leclerc "[didn't] have his normal level of confidence" with the SF1000. Leclerc scored a point by finishing the race 10th, whilst Vettel finished 13th. At the following week's Sakhir Grand Prix, Vettel qualified 13th whilst Leclerc was able to qualify fourth, a result he was "extremely happy" with. On the first lap of the race, Leclerc caused the retirements of both himself and Max Verstappen after colliding with Sergio Pérez during an overtake attempt. Leclerc was handed a three-place grid penalty for the next race, and remarked that he would "try to choose the fights better". Vettel suffered two slow pit stops during the race and crossed the line 12th. After the race, the team stated that issues with the SF1000's wheel nuts had been the cause of their slow pit stops, a problem that had affected the team throughout the year. Vettel remarked that the team's pit equipment "probably needs an overhaul". At the season-ending Abu Dhabi Grand Prix, Leclerc qualified ninth and Vettel qualified 13th in his final race for the team. Both cars fell back in the race, eventually finishing 13th and 14th behind the Ferrari-powered Alfa Romeo of Räikkönen again.

The SF1000 took Ferrari to sixth place in the constructors' championship, the team's worst result since finishing 10th with the Ferrari 312T5 in 1980. After the final race, Vettel commented that the season was "quite tough and tiring" and that he was "happy, obviously, that the season is over". In reference to the upcoming 2021 season, Mattia Binotto remarked "we cannot accept a similar season to 2020", and that "if I look at the way we are developing the car, I've got some hope that the [2021] season can be better."

== Complete Formula One results ==
(key)

| Year | Entrant | Power unit | Tyres | Driver name | Grands Prix | | | | | | | | | | | | | | | | | Points | WCC |
|---|---|---|---|---|---|---|---|---|---|---|---|---|---|---|---|---|---|---|---|---|---|---|---|
| 2020 | Scuderia Ferrari | Ferrari | P | | AUT | STY | HUN | GBR | 70A | ESP | BEL | ITA | TUS | RUS | EIF | POR | EMI | TUR | BHR | SKH | ABU | 131 | 6th |
| 2020 | Scuderia Ferrari | Ferrari | P | Charles Leclerc | 2 | Ret | 11 | 3 | 4 | Ret | 14 | Ret | 8 | 6 | 7 | 4 | 5 | 4 | 10 | Ret | 13 | 131 | 6th |
| 2020 | Scuderia Ferrari | Ferrari | P | Sebastian Vettel | 10 | Ret | 6 | 10 | 12 | 7 | 13 | Ret | 10 | 13 | 11 | 10 | 12 | 3 | 13 | 12 | 14 | 131 | 6th |

Notes

^{†} Driver failed to finish the race, but was classified as they had completed over 90% of the winner's race distance.
