= Ted Toleman =

South African motorsport team principal and founder (1938–2024)

- Born: Norman Edward Toleman; 14 March 1938; Union of South Africa
- Died: 10 April 2024 (aged 86); Manila, Philippines
- Occupation: Professional motor racing team entrepreneur

Norman Edward Toleman (14 March 1938 – 10 April 2024), nicknamed Ted, was a British sports entrepreneur, founder and owner of the Toleman Formula One team.

== Biography ==
Toleman, originally a car transporter businessman in Essex, had a varied life that intersected with multiple industries. Adopted as a child, he later ventured into agriculture, managing a banana farm and a restaurant in South Africa. He relocated after his son Gary was fatally shot by carjackers there in 2003. Toleman's brother Bob died in a Formula Ford accident at Snetterton Circuit in 1976.

Besides working as a racing advisor, Toleman participated in Australia's Mini Challenge Series for a period as well as the 24 Hours of Le Mans and Dakar Rally. Beyond racing, he maintained interests in powerboating and yachting. Toleman also pursued business ventures in both Australia and the Philippines.

Toleman died in the Philippines, on 10 April 2024, at the age of 86.

== Toleman Motorsport ==
After notable success in junior racing categories, Toleman Racing and its operation made their debut in Formula One during the early 1980s. They played a pivotal role in launching the career of Ayrton Senna, who later became an iconic figure in the sport.

Senna's debut in Formula One came with Toleman Racing, and it was a memorable entry. In the rain-soaked Monaco Grand Prix of his rookie season in 1984, Senna showcased his talent by driving the Toleman car to an impressive second place, marking the team's best-ever Formula One result.

Throughout the 1984 season, Senna and Toleman Racing continued to impress, securing two more podium finishes in Great Britain and Portugal. Additionally, they clinched a remarkable pole position at the 1985 German Grand Prix, with Teo Fabi excelling in challenging weather conditions.

Despite Toleman's relatively short stint in Formula One, spanning five seasons and accumulating 26 championship points, the team left a lasting impact. In 1986, Toleman Racing transitioned to Benetton after being sold, leading to the team's rebranding for the subsequent campaign.

Toleman Racing also provided opportunities for several notable Formula One drivers, including Brian Henton, Derek Warwick, Bruno Giacomelli, Johnny Cecotto, Stefan Johansson, Pierluigi Martini, and Piercarlo Ghinzani.

Moreover, Toleman Racing served as a foundation for various Formula One engineers, including Rory Byrne and Pat Symonds.
