= Rory Byrne =

South African engineer and car designer (born 1944)

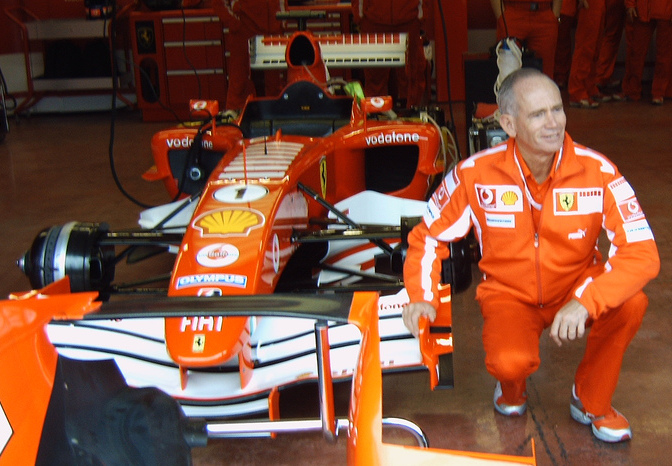
- Byrne with the Ferrari F2005
- Born: 10 January 1944 (age 82); Pretoria, South Africa
- Occupations: Chief designer at Scuderia Ferrari (1996–2006); Design and Development Consultant for Scuderia Ferrari (since 2006)
- Known for: Formula One car designer at Toleman, Benetton, and Ferrari

Rory Byrne (born 10 January 1944) is a South African semi-retired engineer and car designer, most famous for being the chief designer at the Toleman (later Benetton) and Scuderia Ferrari teams of Formula One. Byrne-designed cars have won ninety-nine Grands Prix and seven Constructors' and seven Drivers' titles. This makes Byrne the third most successful Formula One designer, behind rival Adrian Newey and Colin Chapman.

== Early career ==
Born in Pretoria on 10 January 1944, Byrne became interested in motor racing at Witwatersrand University in Johannesburg, firstly as a competitor and later the technical aspects of the sport. After graduating in 1964, Byrne began working as a chemist but retained his fascination for racing until the late 1960s when he, with his friends Dave Collier, Ronny, and Dougie Bennett, set up a company importing performance car parts called Auto Drag and Speed Den situated in Jules Street, Malvern, Johannesburg, and later Voortrekker Road in Alberton. It was in this period that he first began to design racing cars, putting to use his mathematical knowledge even though he lacked formal engineering training. His first car, a Formula Ford racer, was competitive and finished well in the 1972 championship.

Following his success in 1972, Byrne relocated to England to pursue a career in racing car design. Purchasing an ageing Royale Formula Ford car, he began putting together the skills required to improve the design and received a lucky break in 1973 when Royale founder Bob King decided to sell the team. The new owner needed an engineer to replace King, who had also been the cars' designer, and offered the job to Rory Byrne, who spent the next four years designing a variety of cars for Royale and its customers.

An introduction to Ted Toleman in 1977 offered the next opportunity for the thirty-three-year-old who by this time was an established figure in British motor racing. Toleman was owner of a Formula Two team and hired the South African as its designer. Several seasons of increasingly respectable results culminated in first and second place in the 1980 European Formula Two Championship. By this time, the team with Byrne as its chief designer was ready to make the jump into Formula One.

== Formula One ==
=== Toleman/Benetton ===
The first Byrne-designed car to appear at a Grand Prix was the Hart-powered TG181. Lacking the finances to reach the first three long-haul races, Toleman entered Formula One at the 1981 San Marino Grand Prix. Two seasons passed before the fledgling team began to score points; by the conclusion of the 1983 season, Derek Warwick and Bruno Giacomelli had collected a respectable 10 points – enough for the team to finish ninth in the Constructors' championship, and enough to earn Byrne credibility in the pit lane. It was in the off-season of 1983–1984 that Toleman signed Ayrton Senna – a move that almost made Byrne, Senna, and the team first time winners at the 1984 Monaco Grand Prix. The team's steady progress towards the front of the grid was given a boost in 1985 when the Benetton family announced plans to purchase Toleman. With more money, resources, and the most powerful engine available in the form of the inline-four turbocharged BMW M12, it took only until October for Gerhard Berger to secure the first win for himself, the team, and a Byrne-designed car at the 1986 Mexican Grand Prix. Over the following five seasons, Byrne-designed cars took four more race wins but the Benetton Formula team was never in a position to truly challenge the likes of Ferrari, Williams, and McLaren, with most victories being taken on days when the competition faltered.

After a brief spell with the abortive Reynard Formula One project in 1991, Byrne returned to Benetton that fall. What he found was a changed team that was firmly under the control of Flavio Briatore and with hotshot Michael Schumacher as the leading driver. Byrne's Benetton B193 was a substantial technical advancement on the previous season's car, incorporating a semi-automatic gearbox, four-wheel steering, active suspension, and traction control. The car took a single win in the hands of Schumacher, proving that Benetton and Schumacher were ready for a title challenge in 1994. At the first race of 1994, Byrne's Benetton B194 chassis was the car to beat. Critics suggested that the team's domination was more a result of an uncharacteristic slump by Williams star designer Adrian Newey, and accusations of cheating dogged the team for the entire season. A late-season charge by Williams robbed Byrne of his first Constructors' title; however, with his motto of "Evolution not Revolution", everything seemed set for more success in 1995. With the accusations of cheating behind them, the Benetton team secured both titles before the season was finished, and Byrne had what he wanted most as his car had won the Formula One Constructors' crown. With the hugely influential Schumacher leaving Benetton for Ferrari at the end of the season, the team began to fragment and Byrne announced that he would retire in 1996.

=== Ferrari ===
By the conclusion of the 1996 season, Schumacher was being given free rein at Ferrari to build a team of engineers capable of returning the team to the top of the sport after years of underperforming. Benetton technical director Ross Brawn was hired and Ferrari approached Byrne to replace the team's existing chief designer John Barnard, who refused to re-locate to Italy. After long negotiations, Byrne was lured from his retirement in Thailand back to Europe where he began building a design office at Ferrari's Maranello headquarters. Ferrari were immediately competitive once again, taking the title fight to the final race of the season in both 1997 and 1998. Continuing to build momentum in the following seasons, Ferrari won the Constructors' championship in 1999, their first in 17 years. By the end of the 2004 season, Byrne-designed Ferraris had secured 71 race victories, six consecutive Constructors' titles and five consecutive Drivers' titles for Schumacher, with a sustained level of dominance never before seen in the sport. In 2004, Byrne announced that he would be retiring from Formula One at the end of the 2006 season, handing over the role of chief designer to Aldo Costa, his assistant since 1998. On 19 September 2006, it was announced that Byrne had extended his stay to be a consultant at Ferrari for another two years, which led him until early 2009.

In 2012, Byrne was called in to look at the Ferrari F2012 after the car had a troubled start to its life. He was also involved in the design of LaFerrari. In a February 2013 interview to the German magazine Auto Motor und Sport, at the launch of Ferrari F138, Byrne said that he was "working full steam" on Ferrari's 2014 Formula One car in an advisory role. The then Ferrari team principal Maurizio Arrivabene revealed that Byrne is working as mentor in Ferrari helping the chief designer Simone Resta. Byrne was heavily involved in the design of the Ferrari F1-75 in 2022. As the car proved successful on the first part of the season, his contract was renewed for further three years. He was also involved in the design of the Ferrari SF-23 in 2023 and the Ferrari SF-24 in 2024, with the later finishing as a close runner-up in the Constructors' championship, the first time since 2012 that Ferrari was in contention for a title into the last round.

=== Discovery Insure ===
Byrne is a Special Engineering Advisor to Discovery Insure in South Africa in which he assists the company in improving the driving behaviour of South Africans and making the roads safer for all to use.

== Formula One World Championships ==
No.	Seasons	Constructors' Champion	Drivers' Champion	Car	Engine
1	1994 FIA Formula One Season	—N/a	Michael Schumacher	B194	Ford
2	1995 FIA Formula One Season	Benetton	Michael Schumacher	B195	Renault
3	1999 FIA Formula One Season	Ferrari	—N/a	F399	Ferrari
4	2000 FIA Formula One Season	Ferrari	Michael Schumacher	F1-2000	Ferrari
5	2001 FIA Formula One Season	Ferrari	Michael Schumacher	F2001	Ferrari
6	2002 FIA Formula One Season	Ferrari	Michael Schumacher	F2002	Ferrari
7	2003 FIA Formula One Season	Ferrari	Michael Schumacher	F2003-GA	Ferrari
8	2004 FIA Formula One Season	Ferrari	Michael Schumacher	F2004	Ferrari
