= Enrico Cardile =

Italian aerodynamicist (born 1975)

Personal information
- Nationality: Italian
- Born: 5 April 1975 (age 51) Arezzo, Italy
- Education: Aerospace engineering at University of Pisa
- Occupation: Aerodynamicist
- Years active: 2016–present

Sport
- Sport: Formula One
- Position: Chief Technical Officer
- Team: Aston Martin

Enrico Cardile (born 5 April 1975) is an Italian aerodynamicist. Since 2025, Cardile has been the Chief Technical Officer of Aston Martin; he has been Head of Aerodynamics, Vehicle Project Manager, Head of Performance Development, Head of Chassis Area, Head Engineer of Chassis Area and finally Technical Director for Chassis at Scuderia Ferrari and was involved in the design of several Ferrari challengers starting from Ferrari SF70H to Ferrari SF-24, although he was also responsible for the technical direction of the Ferrari SF-25 before his resignation.

== Career ==
Cardile obtained a degree in aerospace engineering at the University of Pisa in 2002. He spent a further three years at the university collaborating with Ferrari on an aerodynamic innovation project. In 2005, he joined Ferrari on FIA GT Championship-related projects, overseeing aerodynamics. In 2016, he moved across to the Formula One team, working as Head of Aero Development, and was appointed as vehicle project manager in the following year.

In July 2024, Aston Martin announced that Cardile had been recruited as the new Chief Technical Officer, which was last occupied by Andrew Green in 2021, and that he would begin work at Aston Martin in the 2025 Formula 1 Season. By March 2025, Cardile was still yet to commence work at Aston Martin even though Group CEO and Team Principal Andy Cowell claimed that Cardile would join the team in 2025. Subsequently, it emerged that Ferrari were reportedly holding Cardile back with the team requesting for Cardile's gardening leave to be a full year, meaning that Cardile would not be able to start at Aston Martin until July 17. A Court Order was subsequently issued by a court in Modena preventing Cardile from starting work at Aston Martin early, which meant Cardile had a full year of gardening leave until 18 July before he was allowed to commence work at Aston Martin. Cardile subsequently commenced work as Chief Technical Officer of Aston Martin from 4 August 2025, where he will report to Managing Technical Partner Adrian Newey.
