= Enrico Racca =

Italian engineer

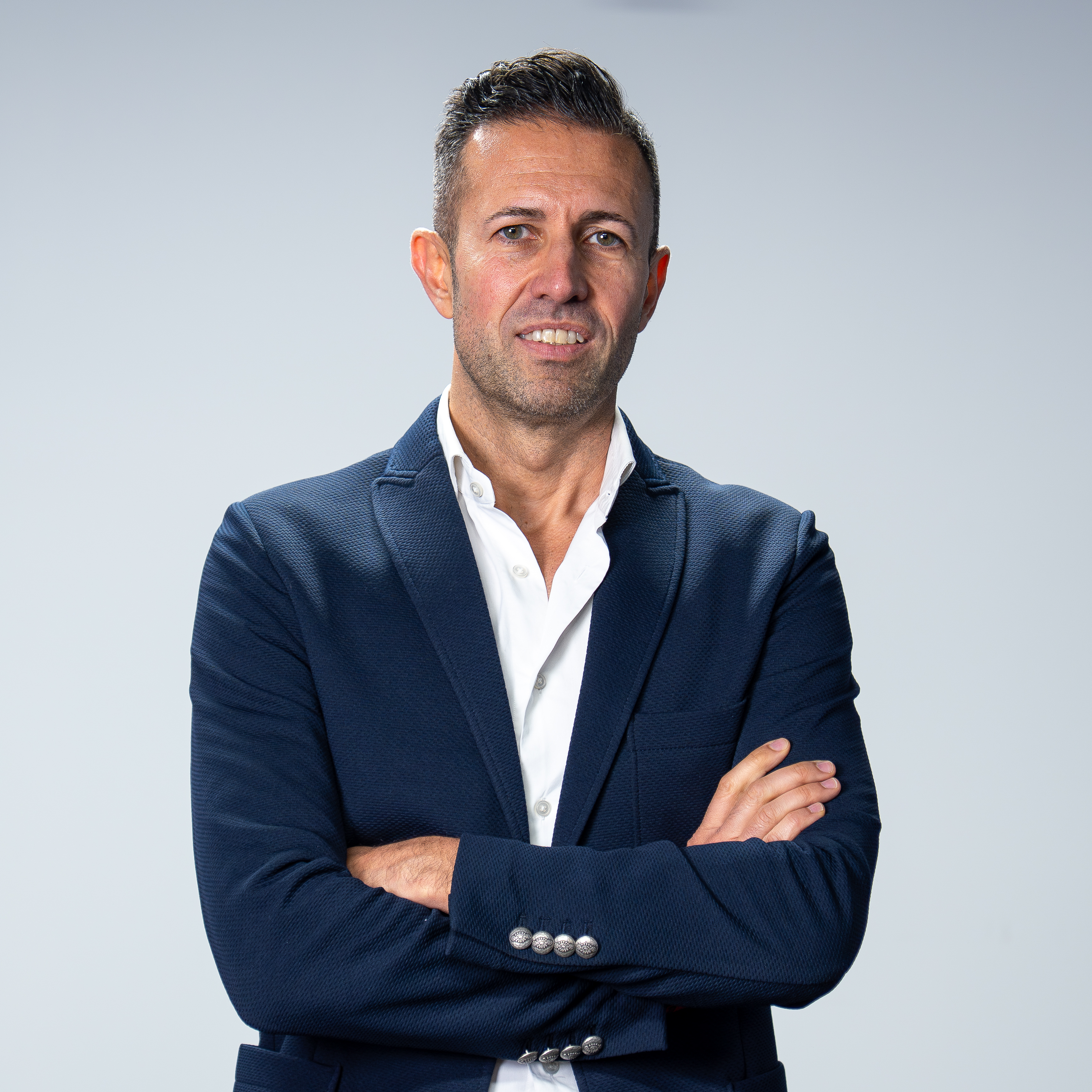
- Born: Enrico Antonio Racca; 21 August 1977 (age 48); Savigliano, Italy
- Education: Electrical engineering
- Alma mater: University of Turin
- Occupations: Engineer; Manufacturing executive
- Years active: 2003–present
- Employer: Multiply Labs
- Known for: Formula One engineer
- Title: General Manager, Multiply Labs Italia

Enrico Antonio Racca (born 21 August 1977) is an Italian engineer and manufacturing executive. He spent a decade at Scuderia Ferrari, latterly as the head of supply chain and manufacturing, and in 2026 joined the U.S. company Multiply Labs as founding general manager of its Italian subsidiary.

== Biography ==
Racca obtained a degree in electrical engineering from Polytechnic University of Turin in 2002, and received a Master of Business Administration from University of Turin. He worked for Fiat Group since 2003, and joined Scuderia Ferrari in 2015. In 2022, he was appointed as the head of supply chain and manufacturing for the team. In May 2026, Racca joined Multiply Labs as chief supply chain and manufacturing officer, and became founding general manager of its Italian subsidiary based in Turin.
