= Diego Tondi =

Italian Formula One engineer

- Education: University of Pisa
- Occupation: Engineer
- Employer: Scuderia Ferrari
- Known for: Formula One aerodynamicist
- Title: Head of aerodynamics

Diego Tondi is an Italian Formula One aerodynamicist. He is currently the Head of Aerodynamics for the Scuderia Ferrari Formula One team.

== Career ==
Tondi studied Aerospace Engineering at the University of Pisa, specialising in aerodynamics, and graduated in 2006. He later worked at the university’s Department of Aerospace Engineering as a CFD Expert, focusing on road car aerodynamic optimisation using RANS Fluent code.

Tondi started his motorsport career with Ferrari in 2007 as an Aerodynamic Engineer, working on aerodynamic development through both simulation and wind tunnel testing. He became an Aerodynamicist in 2008, initially focusing on front-wing testing before transitioning to rear-end development.

He was promoted to Concept Aerodynamicist in 2011, contributing to the design and CFD development of the team’s front-end components, including the front wing, nose, and suspension systems. In 2014, he became Deputy Front Team Group Leader, and later Front Team Group Leader, overseeing a team of aerodynamicists and designers responsible for front-end development of Ferrari’s Formula One cars.

From 2018 to 2020, Tondi led Ferrari’s New Car and Concept Team, coordinating aerodynamic concepts with the technical and vehicle departments. He subsequently held positions as Principal Aerodynamicist and Head of Aerodynamic Development, before being appointed Head of Aerodynamics in 2024.
