= Marco Adurno =

Italian Formula One engineer

- Occupation: Engineer
- Employer: Scuderia Ferrari
- Known for: Formula One engineer
- Title: Head of vehicle performance

Marco Adurno is an Italian Formula One engineer. He is currently the Head of Vehicle Performance for the Scuderia Ferrari Formula One team.

== Career ==
Adurno graduated from the Polytechnic University of Milan with a degree in Aerospace, Aeronautical and Astronautical engineering. He pursued a master's degree in Aerospace engineering at ISAE-SUPAERO.

He began his career with Airbus, working as a Structural Loads and Aeroelastics Engineer. He then moved to Formula One, joining Red Bull Racing as a Modelling and Simulation Engineer, where he worked on vehicle simulation and performance modelling for nearly two years. He subsequently joined Piaggio Aerospace in September 2009 as a Flight Control Laws Specialist, focusing on advanced flight dynamics and control systems.

He returned to Red Bull in March 2011, serving first as a Senior Simulation Engineer and later as Group Leader of Analysis & Simulation from April 2014 to September 2019. Over more than eight years with the team, Adurno was involved in the continuous development of Red Bull's vehicle modelling, track performance tools, and simulation frameworks.

In September 2019, Adurno joined Scuderia Ferrari as a Performance Analytics Technical Expert, before being promoted to Head of Vehicle Performance in January 2021. In this role, he oversees Ferrari's vehicle performance department, integrating aerodynamics, dynamics, and simulation data to maximise competitiveness on track.
