= Enrico Gualtieri =

Italian Formula One engineer (born 1975)

Personal information
- Nationality: Italian
- Born: 21 February 1975 (age 51) Modena, Italy
- Education: Mechanical engineering at University of Modena and Reggio Emilia
- Occupation: Engineer
- Years active: 2000–present

Sport
- Sport: Formula One
- Position: Head of power unit
- Team: Scuderia Ferrari

Enrico Gualtieri (born 21 February 1975) is an Italian engineer. Since 2023, he is serving as the Technical Director of power unit for Scuderia Ferrari.

== Career ==
Gualtieri graduated from University of Modena and Reggio Emilia with a degree of mechanical engineering in 2000. He came to Ferrari to work on his thesis, and stayed with the team since then. Being promoted step by step, he was appointed as head of power unit in 2019, and was named technical director of power unit in 2023.
