= Fabio Montecchi =

Italian engineer

- Citizenship: Italian
- Education: University of Modena and Reggio Emilia
- Occupation: Engineer
- Employer: Scuderia Ferrari
- Known for: Formula One engineer
- Title: Chief project engineer

Fabio Montecchi is an Italian Formula One engineer. He is currently the chief project engineer at the Scuderia Ferrari Formula One team.

== Career ==
After studying mechanical engineering at the University of Modena and Reggio Emilia, Montecchi started his career in motorsport as a simulation engineer in the design office for Scuderia Ferrari. In 2007 he progressed to leading the simulation department winning two constructors' and one drivers' title with the Italian outfit. He progressed onto to becoming Deputy Chief Designer alongside Simone Resta being responsible for the Ferrari F14 T. From 2015 to 2018 he was the deputy chief designer being jointly responsible for cars that regularly challenged for race wins and podiums. In 2019 Montecchi became vehicle project manager before being promoted to chief project engineer in 2021.
