= Alfa Romeo C42 =

2022 Formula One racing car

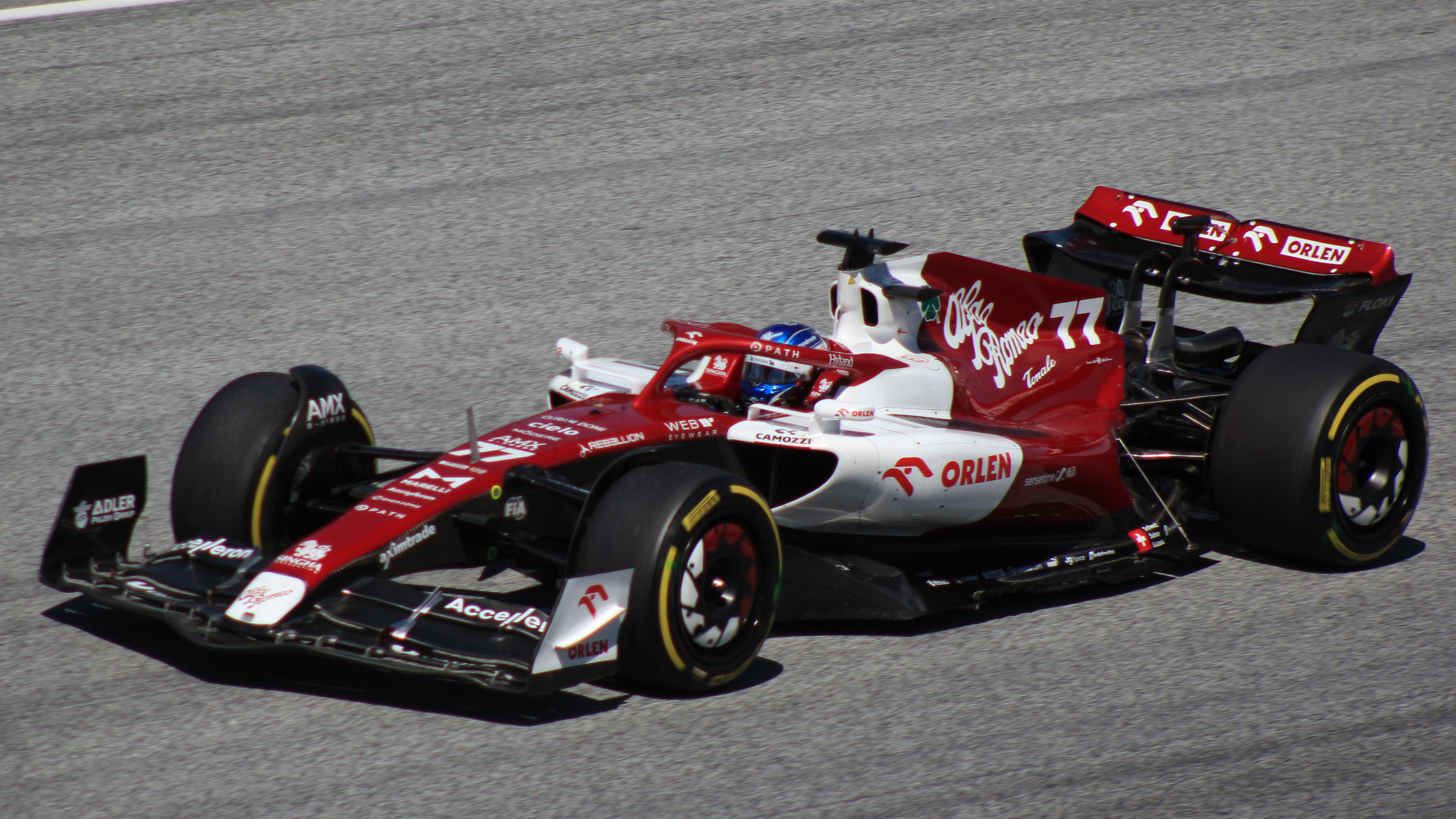
- Valtteri Bottas driving an Alfa Romeo C42 during the Austrian Grand Prix
- Category: Formula One
- Constructor: Alfa Romeo
- Designers: Jan Monchaux (Technical Director); Luca Furbatto (Chief Designer); Lucia Conconi (Head of Vehicle Performance); Alessandro Cinelli (Head of Aerodynamics); Franck Sanchez (Chief Aerodynamicist)
- Predecessor: Alfa Romeo Racing C41
- Successor: Alfa Romeo C43

Technical specifications
- Suspension (front): Double wishbone push-rod
- Suspension (rear): Double wishbone push-rod
- Engine: Ferrari 066/7 1.6 L (98 cu in) direct injection V6 turbocharged engine limited to 15,000 RPM in a mid-mounted, rear-wheel drive layout 1.6 L (98 cu in) V6 (90°) turbocharged, 15,000 RPM limited mid-mounted.
- Electric motor: Ferrari Kinetic and thermal energy recovery systems
- Transmission: Ferrari 8-speed + 1 reverse sequential seamless semi-automatic paddle shift with epicyclic differential and multi-plate limited slip clutch
- Battery: Lithium-ion battery
- Fuel: Shell V-Power (Note: Orlen branding appeared on the C42, but the car used Shell V-Power fuels and Shell Helix lubricants.)
- Lubricants: Shell Helix Ultra
- Tyres: Pirelli P Zero (dry); Pirelli Cinturato (wet)

Competition history
- Notable entrants: Alfa Romeo F1 Team Orlen
- Notable drivers: 24. (China) Zhou Guanyu; 77. (Finland) Valtteri Bottas
- Debut: 2022 Bahrain Grand Prix
- Last event: 2022 Abu Dhabi Grand Prix
Races	Wins	Podiums	Poles	F/Laps
22	0	0	0	1

The Alfa Romeo C42 is a Formula One car designed and built by Alfa Romeo to compete in the 2022 Formula One World Championship. The C42 is built to the new generation of technical regulations, originally intended for introduction in 2021.

The car was driven by former Mercedes driver Valtteri Bottas and rookie Zhou Guanyu.

== Background ==
=== Development context ===
The new generation of technical regulations were intended to be introduced in the 2021 season. However, due to the disruption of the COVID-19 pandemic, the regulations were delayed until 2022. Development of all new generation cars was thus paused from 28 March 2020 until 31 December 2020.

=== Naming ===
The C42 follows the C41, which in turn follows the C39. The new-generation car had been internally allocated the designation C40 in anticipation of new regulations for the 2021 season. When these were delayed because of the COVID-19 pandemic, a new car, the C41, had to be developed based on the C39 for the interim regulations. However, ahead of the car's unveiling, Alfa Romeo stated that the car would not carry the C40 but instead carry the C42 designation to avoid the sequence of C39, C41, C40, which could have been confusing.

=== Initial design and development ===
Bottas commented that the early version of the C42 ran on the Alfa Romeo simulator did not handle significantly differently to the 2021 cars.

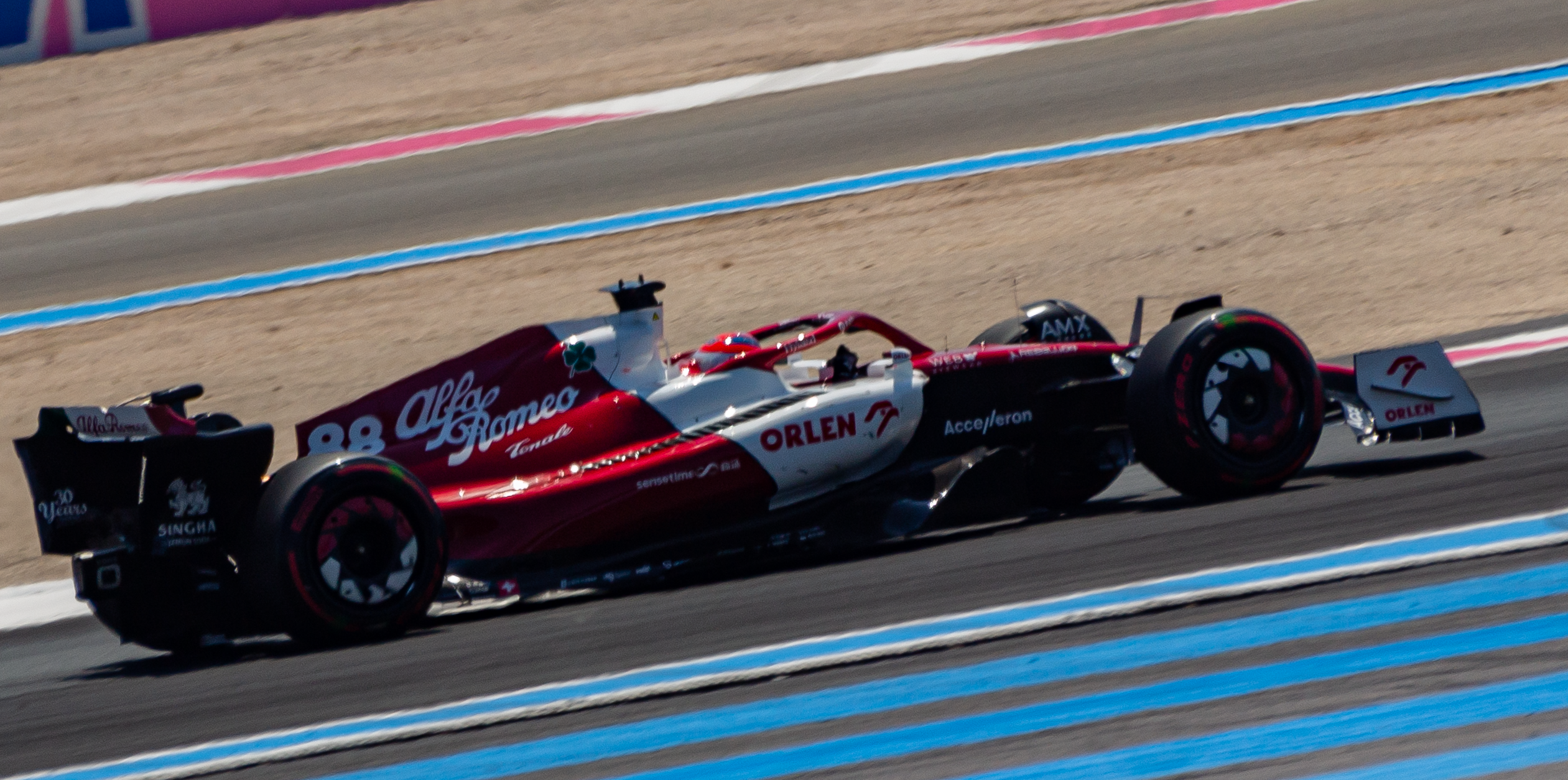
Reserve driver Robert Kubica at the FP1 of the French Grand Prix

Alfa Romeo used push-rod suspension on both the front and rear, in contrast to the push-rod front and pull-rod rear that had become standard in the turbo-hybrid era. The C42 has the shortest wheelbase of any 2022 car. It packages its Ferrari engine much the same as the works team, with wide sidepods featuring cooling louvres over the top. Alfa Romeo developed several major components in-house rather than sourcing them from Ferrari as it and its predecessor team Sauber had done since Sauber became a Ferrari customer team in 2010. These parts include the fuel tank, rear suspension, and exterior structure of the gearbox (the interior components of the gearbox are still Ferrari-sourced). Technical Director Jan Monchaux listed Formula One's new budget regulations and greater engineering freedom and independence as reasons why Alfa Romeo decided to design these components independently.

The C42 was the only car to weigh less than the original minimum weight requirement of 795 kg (1,753 lb). Several other teams lobbied the FIA to increase the minimum weight, with a compromise reached to raise the minimum weight limit to 798 kg (1,759 lb).

=== Sponsorship and livery ===
At the Saudi Arabian Grand Prix, the Singha logo was replaced by “Singha Lemon Soda” due to the country’s regulations regarding alcohol advertising.

For the Azerbaijan Grand Prix, to coincide with the launch of the Alfa Romeo Tonale, the two C42s had a special livery, distinguished by the replacement of the red colour on the rear of the vehicle with the Montreal Green.

For the Italian Grand Prix, in celebration of the Monza circuit's centenary, the Alfa Romeo logos—featuring the brand name in an oblique script—on the nose and the right side of the engine cover were replaced by one of the company's early emblem versions, which includes the cross from the coat of arms of Milan and the Visconti Biscione.

== Competition and development history ==
The car proved to immediately be more competitive than its predecessors, as the team took a double-points on the car's debut in Bahrain. The result of P6 (Bottas) was the team's highest finish in a race since 2019. The strong start was followed by subsequent points finishes for Bottas in Australia, Imola, Miami, Spain, and Monaco, and then another double-points finish in Canada. This was aided by a substantial upgrade to the C42 at the Emilia Romagna Grand Prix. The upgrade featured a new floor edge and strake design as well as new sidepods that merged with the floor. Changes were also made to the rear brake ducts.

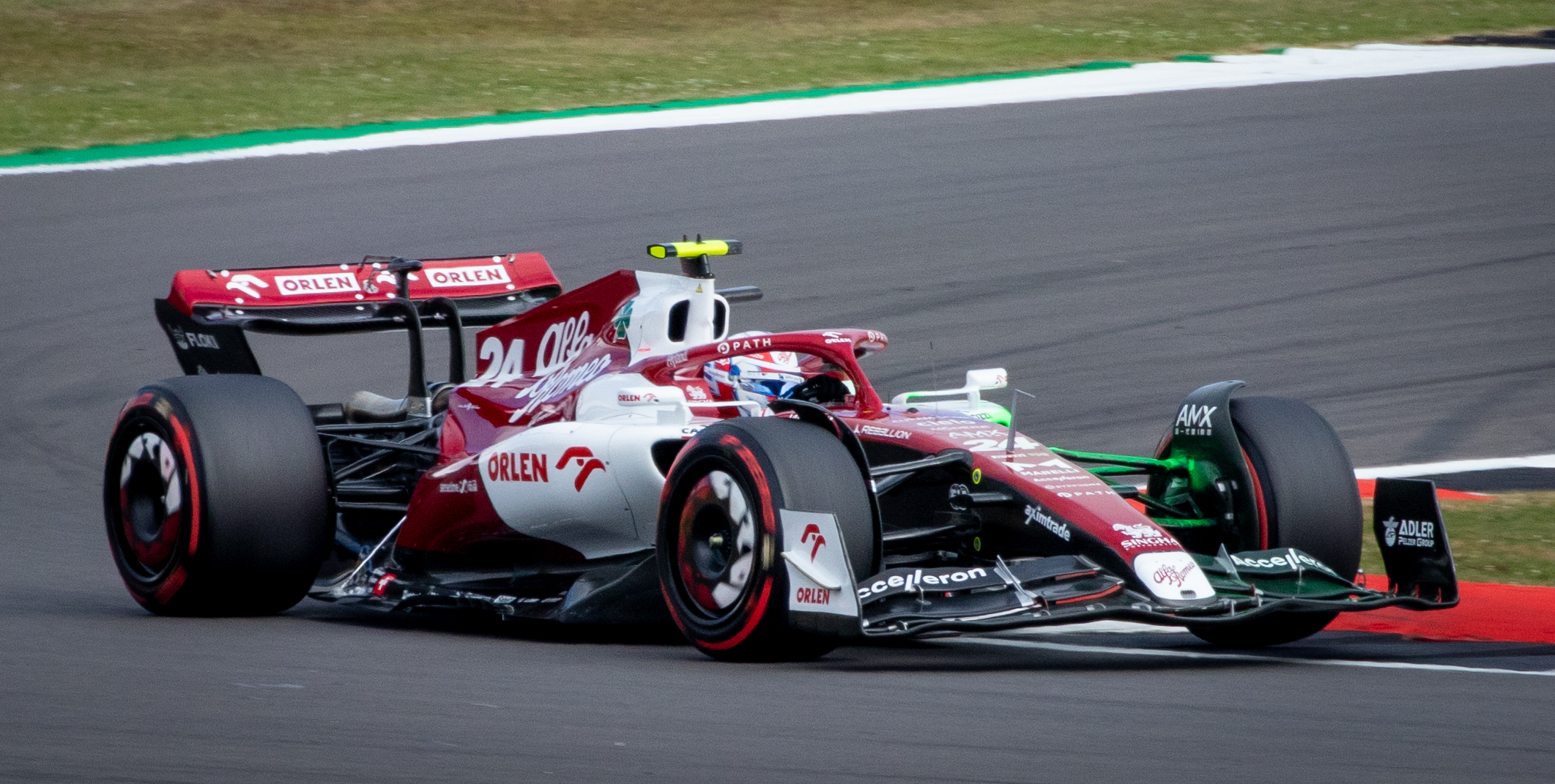
Zhou driving the C42 at the British Grand Prix

The car did suffer from reliability issues, both in testing and at the races, with Bottas retiring in Saudi Arabia while running in the points, as well Zhou retiring with mechanical problems in Miami, Spain, and Baku. Even when the car did not retire from races, the team was often forced to miss portions of practice due to reliability problems, which often put the team on the back foot in terms of preparation for qualifying and/or the race. The car suffered a distinct loss in competitiveness relative to the field, as the car only picked up three points finishes after Canada, courtesy of Zhou's P10 finish at Monza, as well as Bottas' point finishes at Mexico and Brazil. Aston Martin would later catch up to and finish with the same number of points as Alfa Romeo in the constructors' championship, but ultimately finished P7 and Alfa Romeo claimed P6 for the first time since 2012 (when the team was competing as Sauber) thanks to the tiebreaker – Bottas' P5 finish at Imola.

== Complete Formula One results ==
Key

Key
Colour	Result
Gold	Winner
Silver	Second place
Bronze	Third place
Green	Other points position
Blue	Other classified position
Blue	Not classified, finished (NC)
Purple	Not classified, retired (Ret)
Red	Did not qualify (DNQ)
Black	Disqualified (DSQ)
White	Did not start (DNS)
White	Race cancelled (C)
Blank	Did not practice (DNP)
Blank	Excluded (EX)
Blank	Did not arrive (DNA)
Blank	Withdrawn (WD)
Blank	Did not enter (empty cell)
Annotation	Meaning
P	Pole position
F	Fastest lap
Superscript number	Points-scoring position in sprint

Year	Entrant	Power unit	Tyres	Driver name	Grands Prix																						Points	WCC pos.
Year	Entrant	Power unit	Tyres	Driver name	BHR	SAU	AUS	EMI	MIA	ESP	MON	AZE	CAN	GBR	AUT	FRA	HUN	BEL	NED	ITA	SIN	JPN	USA	MXC	SAP	ABU	Points	WCC pos.
2022	Alfa Romeo F1 Team ORLEN	Ferrari 066/7	P	(Finland) Valtteri Bottas	6	Ret	8	5^{7}	7	6	9	11	7	Ret	11	14	20†	Ret	Ret	13	11	15	Ret	10	9	15	55	6th
2022	Alfa Romeo F1 Team ORLEN	Ferrari 066/7	P	(China) Zhou Guanyu	10	11	11	15	Ret	Ret	16	Ret	8	Ret	14	16†	13	14	16	10	Ret	16^{F}	12	13	12	12	55	6th
