= Alfa Romeo Racing C41 =

Alfa Romeo's 2021 Formula One car

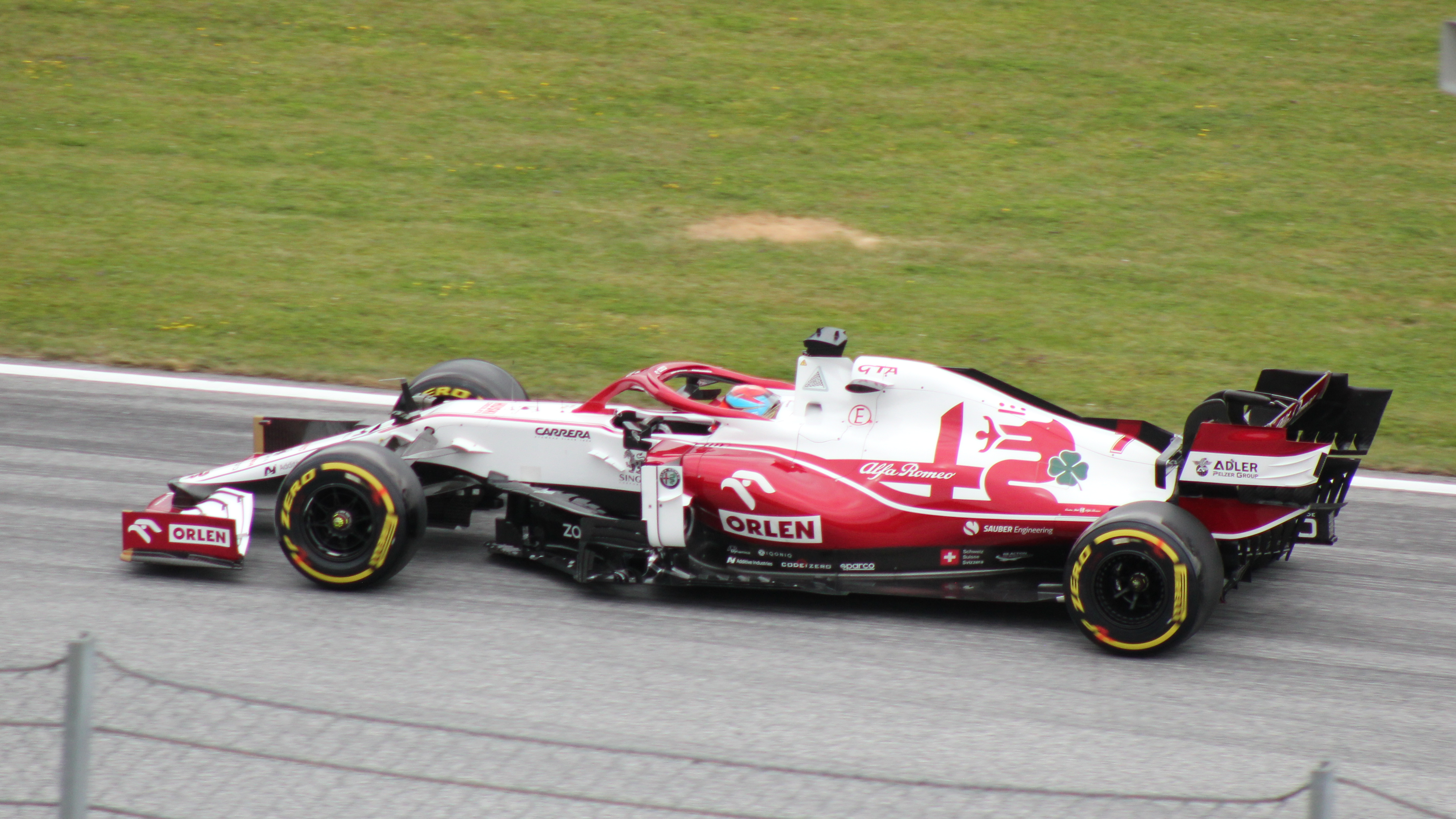
- Kimi Räikkönen in the C41 during practice at the 2021 Austrian Grand Prix
- Category: Formula 1
- Constructor: Alfa Romeo Racing
- Designers: Jan Monchaux (Technical Director); Luca Furbatto (Chief Designer); Lucia Conconi (Head of Vehicle Performance); Alessandro Cinelli (Head of Aerodynamics); Nicolas Hennel (Chief Aerodynamicist)
- Predecessor: Alfa Romeo Racing C39
- Successor: Alfa Romeo C42

Technical specifications
- Engine: Ferrari 065/6
- Fuel: Shell V-Power (Note: Orlen branding appeared on the C41, but the car used Shell V-Power fuels and Shell Helix lubricants.)
- Lubricants: Shell Helix Ultra
- Tyres: Pirelli P Zero (dry); Pirelli Cinturato (wet)

Competition history
- Notable entrants: Alfa Romeo Racing Orlen
- Notable drivers: 7. (Finland) Kimi Räikkönen; 88. (Poland) Robert Kubica; 99. (Italy) Antonio Giovinazzi
- Debut: 2021 Bahrain Grand Prix
- Last event: 2021 Abu Dhabi Grand Prix
Races	Wins	Podiums	Poles	F/Laps
22	0	0	0	0

The Alfa Romeo Racing C41 is a Formula One car constructed by Alfa Romeo Racing to compete in the 2021 Formula 1 World Championship. The car was driven by Kimi Räikkönen and Antonio Giovinazzi, who returned for their third year with the team. Robert Kubica drove for the team at the Dutch and Italian Grands Prix replacing Räikkönen who withdrew from the events after testing positive for COVID-19. The chassis was designed by Jan Monchaux, Luca Furbatto, Lucia Conconi, Alessandro Cinelli and Nicolas Hennel with the car being powered by a customer Ferrari powertrain.

== Development ==
The car is an evolution of its predecessor, the C39. Development of the C40, Alfa's next-generation car, had already begun before the new regulations were pushed to 2022; the designation was retained, with the 2021 car adopting the C41 designation.

2020 cars were carried over into the 2021 season as a cost-savings measure due to the ongoing COVID-19 pandemic. To allow development, the FIA introduced a token system allowing teams to develop only certain areas of their cars. Alfa Romeo spent their tokens on improving the nose of the car, adopting a slimmer design to redirect air over the bargeboards.

== Assessment and characteristics ==
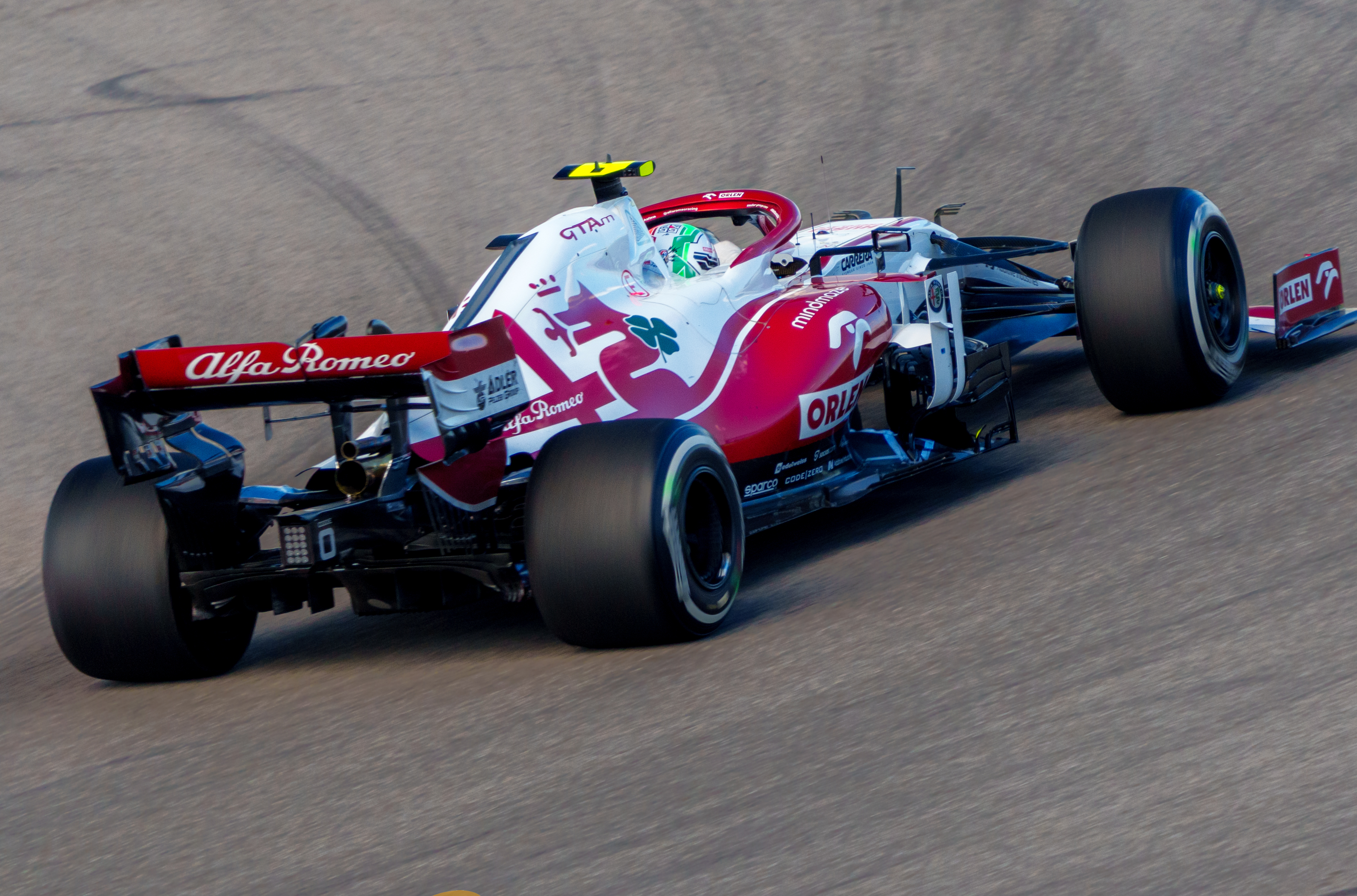
Giovinazzi at the United States Grand Prix

Journalists and technical analysts Mark Hughes and Giorgio Piola described the C41 as the most-improved car over its 2020 equivalent, calling it "both more powerful and more aerodynamically competitive than its C39 predecessor" due to a combination of power unit development by Ferrari and Alfa Romeo's own improvements.

== Sponsorship and livery ==
At the Styrian Grand Prix, the car ran with a special livery commemorating the automaker's 111th anniversary while for their home race, they ran in tricolour.

At the Abu Dhabi Grand Prix, two different messages featured on the engine cover: Räikkönen's car reads "Dear Kimi, we will leave you alone now", this is a reference to his famous quote at the 2012 Abu Dhabi Grand Prix when he wins for the first time since two years leaving the sport, while for Giovinazzi's car reads "Grazie di tutto, Antonio" ("Thanks for everything, Antonio").

== Complete Formula One results ==
(key)

Year	Entrant	Power unit	Tyres	Driver name	Grands Prix																						Points	WCC pos.
Year	Entrant	Power unit	Tyres	Driver name	BHR	EMI	POR	ESP	MON	AZE	FRA	STY	AUT	GBR	HUN	BEL	NED	ITA	RUS	TUR	USA	MXC	SAP	QAT	SAU	ABU	Points	WCC pos.
2021	Alfa Romeo Racing ORLEN	Ferrari 065/6	P	(Italy) Antonio Giovinazzi	12	14	12	15	10	11	15	15	14	13	13	13	14	13	16	11	11	11	14	15	9	Ret	13	9th
2021	Alfa Romeo Racing ORLEN	Ferrari 065/6	P	(Finland) Kimi Räikkönen	11	13	Ret	12	11	10	17	11	15	15	10	18	WD		8	12	13	8	12	14	15	Ret	13	9th
2021	Alfa Romeo Racing ORLEN	Ferrari 065/6	P	(Poland) Robert Kubica													15	14									13	9th
