= Alfa Romeo Racing C39 =

Alfa Romeo Racing car for the 2020 Formula One season

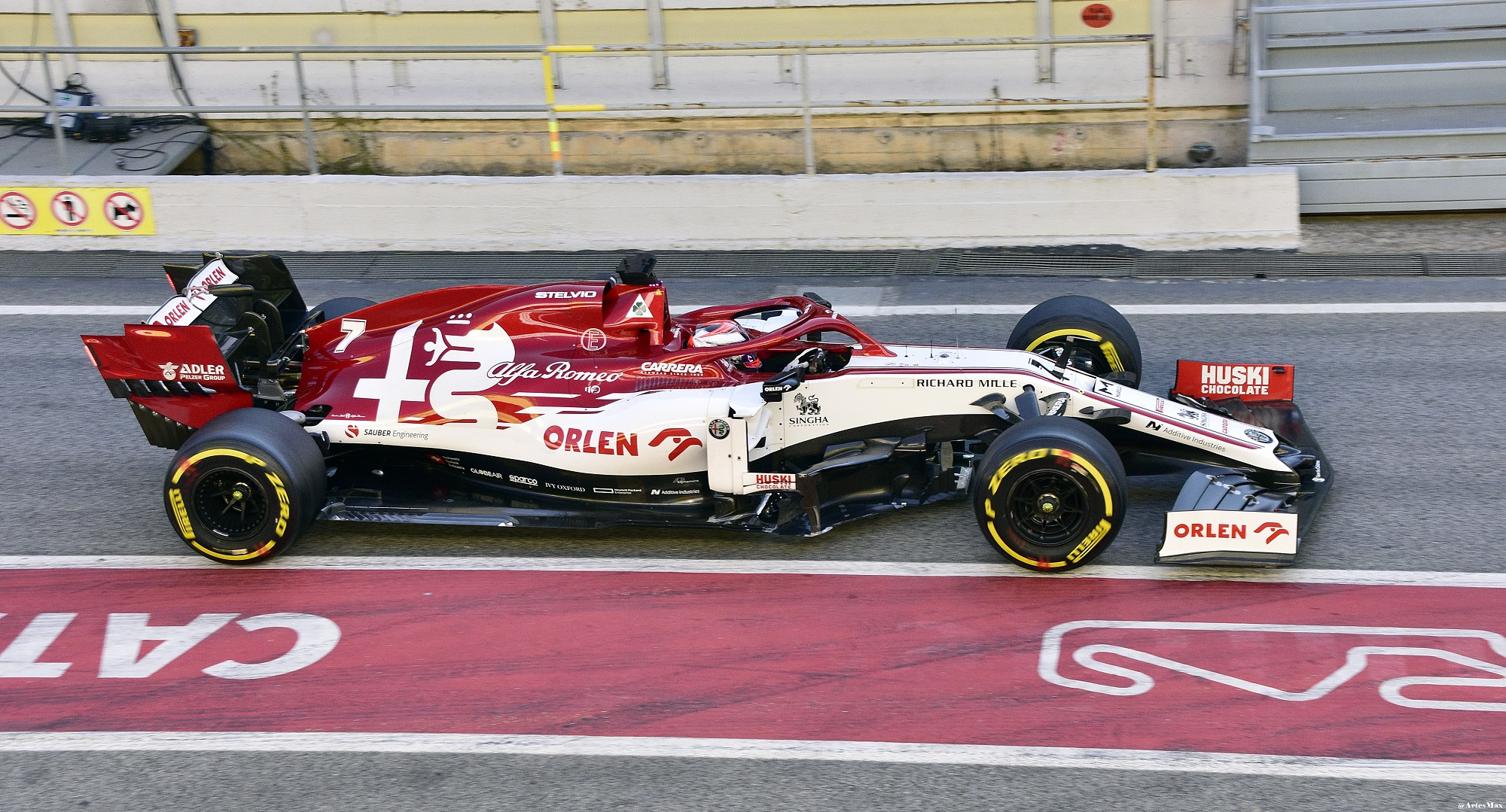
- A C39 driven by Kimi Räikkönen during the 2020 Formula One pre-season testing.
- Category: Formula One
- Constructor: Alfa Romeo Racing
- Designers: Jan Monchaux (Technical Director); Luca Furbatto (Chief Designer); Lucia Conconi (Head of Vehicle Performance); Alessandro Cinelli (Head of Aerodynamics); Nicolas Hennel (Chief Aerodynamicist)
- Predecessor: Alfa Romeo Racing C38
- Successor: Alfa Romeo Racing C41

Technical specifications
- Length: 5,550 millimetres (219 in)
- Width: 2,000 millimetres (79 in)
- Height: 950 millimetres (37 in)
- Engine: Ferrari 065 1.6 L (98 cu in)
- Weight: 760 kilograms (1,680 lb)
- Fuel: Shell V-Power (Note: Orlen branding appeared on the C39, but the car used Shell V-Power fuels and Shell Helix lubricants.)
- Lubricants: Shell Helix Ultra
- Tyres: Pirelli P Zero (dry); Pirelli Cinturato (wet)

Competition history
- Notable entrants: Alfa Romeo Racing Orlen
- Notable drivers: 7. (Finland) Kimi Räikkönen; 99. (Italy) Antonio Giovinazzi
- Debut: 2020 Austrian Grand Prix
- Last event: 2020 Abu Dhabi Grand Prix
Races	Wins	Podiums	Poles	F/Laps
17	0	0	0	0

The Alfa Romeo Racing C39 is a Formula One car constructed by Alfa Romeo Racing to compete in the 2020 Formula One World Championship. The car was driven by Kimi Räikkönen and Antonio Giovinazzi, returning for their second year with the team. Robert Kubica acted as the team's reserve driver. The car was planned to make its competitive debut at the 2020 Australian Grand Prix, but this was delayed when the race was cancelled and the next three events in Bahrain, Vietnam and China were postponed in response to the COVID-19 pandemic. The C39 made its debut at the 2020 Austrian Grand Prix.

The chassis was designed by Jan Monchaux, Luca Furbatto, Lucia Conconi, Alessandro Cinelli and Nicolas Hennel with the car being powered with a customer Ferrari powertrain.

== Competition history ==
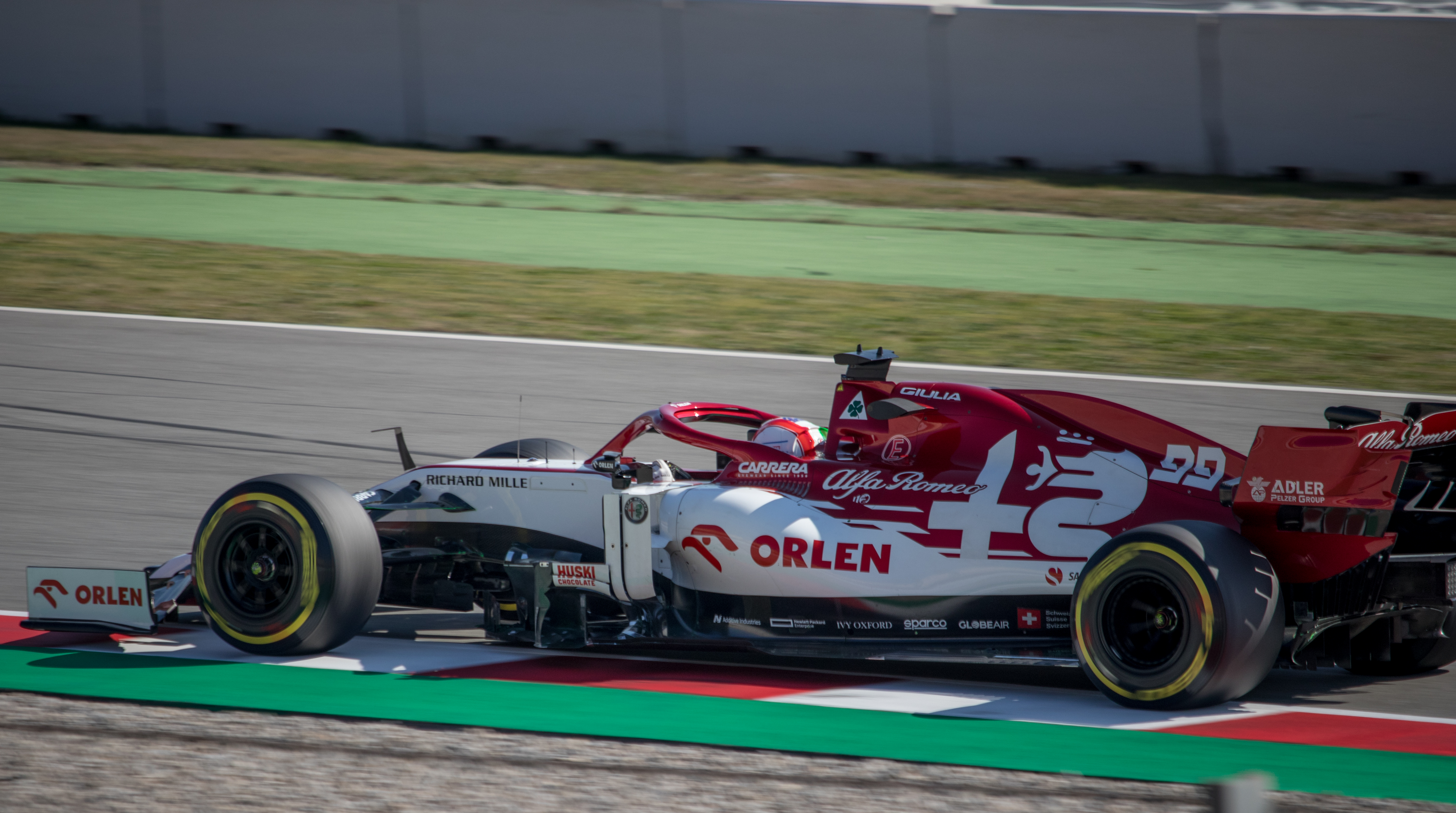
Giovinazzi during the pre-season testing

Prior to pre-season testing, Alfa Romeo painted the car in a "snake skin" livery. The car then went back to its competition livery for pre-season testing. At the season opening Austrian Grand Prix, Kimi Räikkönen's right front tyre came off prompting retirement. Antonio Giovinazzi finished 9th, giving Alfa Romeo two points. At the Styrian Grand Prix, Räikkönen finished in 11th place and Giovinazzi finished 14th, both 1 lap down. At the Hungarian Grand Prix, Räikkönen was too far forward at the start, rendering him out of position. He was given a five-second penalty for this during the race. The cars were the last two finishers, after qualifying on the back row. Although the car began the season at the back of the grid, it has gradually improved as the season has progressed, including a 12th-place finish ahead of both works Ferraris by Räikkönen at the Belgian Grand Prix. As with the Ferrari SF1000, and fellow Ferrari engine customers Haas' entry, the VF-20, the car has been consistently hampered by a lack of power from its Ferrari engine and thus has struggled to compete with other midfield teams, especially at power-dependent circuits. In most races, they race at the back of the grid with Haas and Williams.

== Sponsorship and livery ==
Before the start of the season on 15 May, a special logo was created to celebrate company Sauber Motorsport's 50th anniversary.

For Emilia-Romagna Grand Prix, the car bore an Italian flag with the text "Welcome back Imola" as well as the automaker's 110th anniversary logo on the top of the engine cover.

At the Turkish Grand Prix, Alfa Romeo team's participation marked the 500th Grand Prix entry by a team run by the Sauber Motorsport company.

== Later use ==
A modified C39 was used during testing of the 2022 tyre compounds after the 2021 Abu Dhabi Grand Prix.

== Complete Formula One results ==
(key)

Year	Entrant	Power unit	Tyres	Driver	Grands Prix																	Points	WCC
2020	Alfa Romeo Racing ORLEN	Ferrari	P		AUT	STY	HUN	GBR	70A	ESP	BEL	ITA	TUS	RUS	EIF	POR	EMI	TUR	BHR	SKH	ABU	8	8th
2020	Alfa Romeo Racing ORLEN	Ferrari	P	(Italy) Antonio Giovinazzi	9	14	17	14	17	16	Ret	16	Ret	11	10	15	10	Ret	16	13	16	8	8th
2020	Alfa Romeo Racing ORLEN	Ferrari	P	(Finland) Kimi Räikkönen	Ret	11	15	17	15	14	12	13	9	14	12	11	9	15	15	14	12	8	8th

^{†} Driver failed to finish the race, but was classified as they had completed over 90% of the winner's race distance.
