= Alfa Romeo Racing C38 =

2019 Formula One racing car

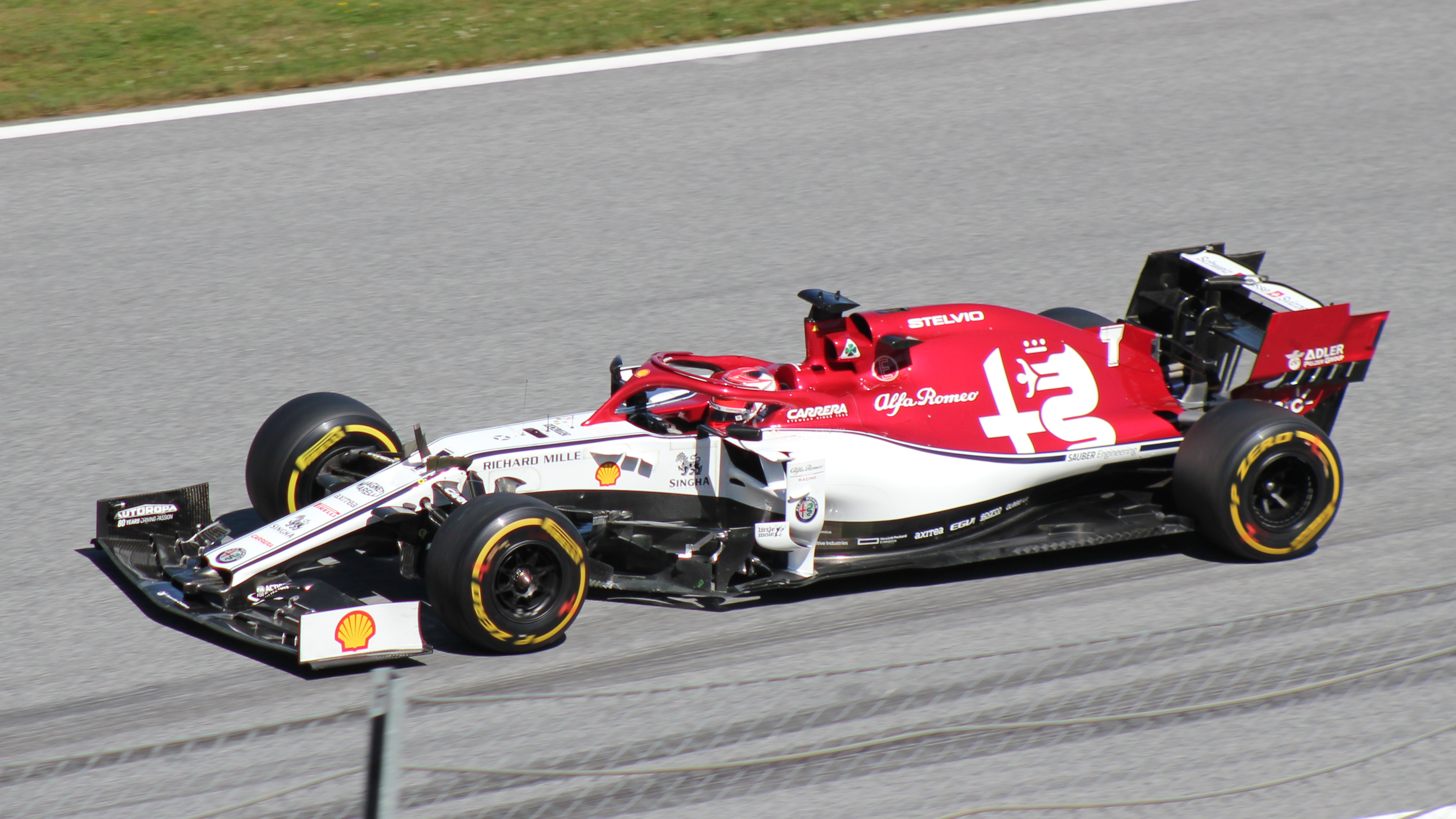
- Kimi Räikkönen driving the C38 during the Austrian Grand Prix
- Category: Formula One
- Constructor: Alfa Romeo
- Designers: Simone Resta (Technical Director); Luca Furbatto (Chief Designer); Ian Wright (Head of Vehicle Performance); Jan Monchaux (Head of Aerodynamics); Mariano Alperin (Head of Aerodynamic Development); Nicolas Hennel (Chief Aerodynamicist)
- Predecessor: Sauber C37 - Sauber Engineering; Alfa Romeo 185T - Alfa Romeo branded
- Successor: Alfa Romeo Racing C39

Technical specifications
- Suspension (front): Double wishbone, inboard spring and damper unit actuated by push-rods
- Suspension (rear): Multilink, inboard spring and damper elements actuated by pull-rods
- Length: 5,500 mm (216.5 in)
- Width: 2,000 mm (78.7 in)
- Height: 950 mm (37.4 in)
- Engine: Ferrari 064 1.6 L (98 cu in) direct injection V6 turbocharged engine limited to 15,000 RPM in a mid-mounted, rear-wheel drive layout
- Electric motor: Ferrari kinetic and thermal energy recovery systems
- Transmission: Ferrari 8-speed quick-shift carbon gearbox, longitudinally mounted, carbon-composite clutch
- Weight: 740 kg (1,631.4 lb)
- Fuel: Shell V-Power
- Brakes: 6-piston Brembo brake calipers (carbon-composite discs/pads)
- Tyres: Pirelli P Zero (dry); Pirelli Cinturato (wet)

Competition history
- Notable entrants: Alfa Romeo Racing
- Notable drivers: 7. (Finland) Kimi Räikkönen; 99. (Italy) Antonio Giovinazzi
- Debut: 2019 Australian Grand Prix
- Last event: 2019 Abu Dhabi Grand Prix
Races	Wins	Podiums	Poles	F/Laps
21	0	0	0	0

The Alfa Romeo Racing C38 (originally known as the Sauber C38) is a Formula One racing car designed and constructed by Alfa Romeo Racing to compete during the 2019 Formula One World Championship. It is the first Sauber-engineered car to be badged Alfa Romeo following a team renaming deal struck with Sauber Motorsport AG in February 2019. It was Alfa Romeo's first season as a F1 team since 1985. The car was driven by Kimi Räikkönen and Antonio Giovinazzi, and made its debut at the 2019 Australian Grand Prix. The car finished 8th in the Constructors' Championship with 57 points, 43 for Räikkönen and 14 for Giovinazzi.

The chassis was designed by Simone Resta, Luca Furbatto, Ian Wright, Jan Monchaux and Nicolas Hennel with the car being powered with a customer Ferrari powertrain.

== Technical details ==
The C38's engine is a 1600cc V6 engine, with a single turbocharger. The Energy Recovery System (ERS) is accumulated into a battery pack and deployed via a 120 kW electric motor. The C38 has an 8-speed gearbox, 6-piston Brembo brake callipers, and carbon-composite discs and pads from Carbon Industries. The chassis is a carbon-composite monocoque; the front suspension has double wishbones, with inboard spring and damper units actuated by push-rods; the rear suspension is Multilink, with inboard spring and damper elements actuated by pull-rods. The C38 has OZ wheels and Pirelli tyres.

== Competition history ==
=== Opening rounds ===
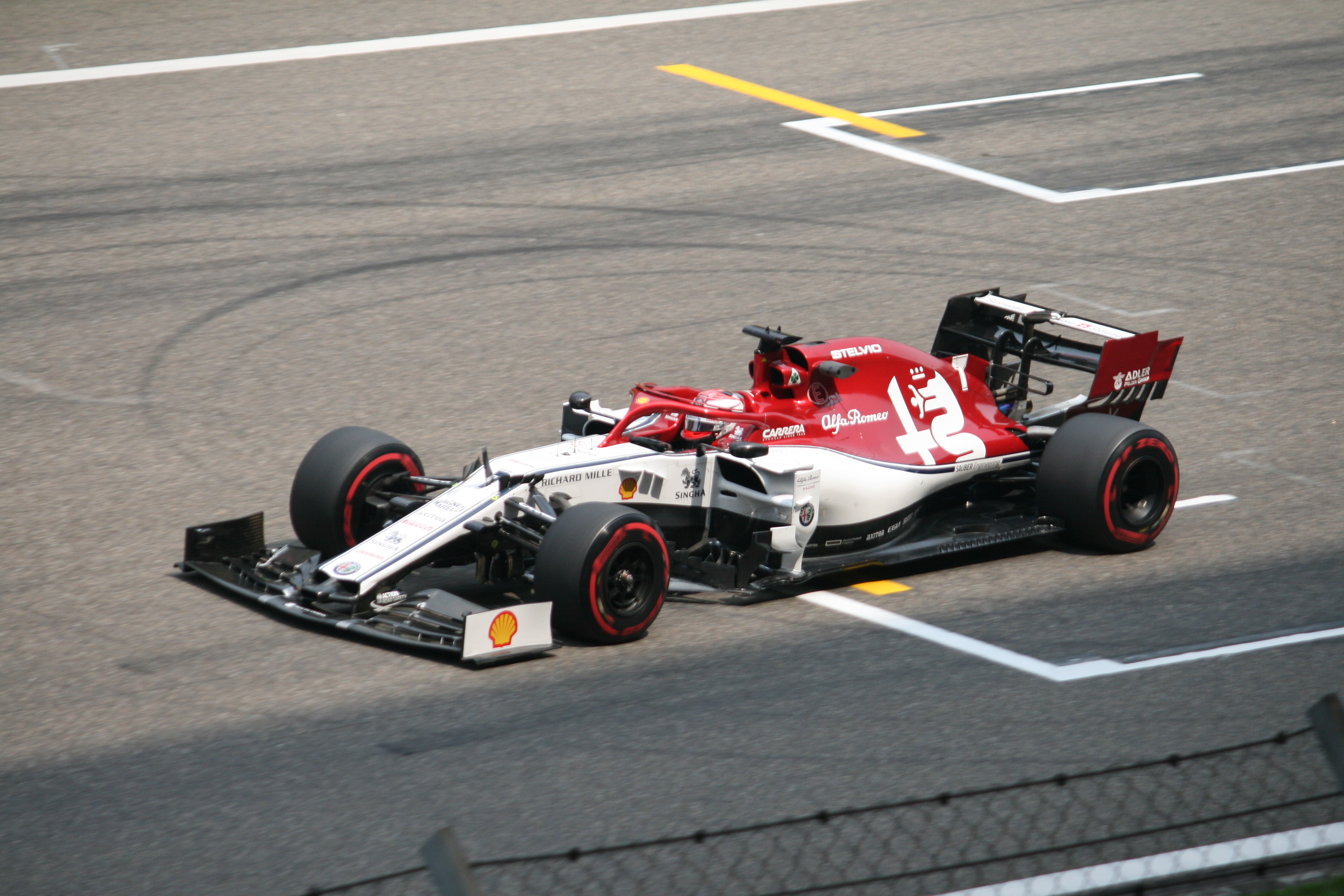
Räikkönen at the Chinese Grand Prix

At the opening race in Australia, Räikkönen and Giovinazzi qualified 9th and 14th respectively. Giovinazzi would go on to finish 15th, whilst Räikkönen finished 8th, scoring Alfa Romeo's first points in Formula One since the 1984 European Grand Prix. Räikkönen went on to score three more consecutive points finishes, including 7th in Bahrain and 9th in China. In Azerbaijan, Räikkönen's car failed a front wing deflection test, excluding him from qualifying and forcing him to start the race from the pit lane. An impressive recovery drive saw him finish 10th.

=== European and Canadian rounds ===
A brief dip in fortunes followed as the team failed to score points in the next three races, the best finish being 13th place for Giovinazzi in Canada. A particularly poor showing came in Monaco, after Giovinazzi was penalised for causing a collision and would go on to finish the race in 19th place, whilst Räikkönen could only salvage 17th.

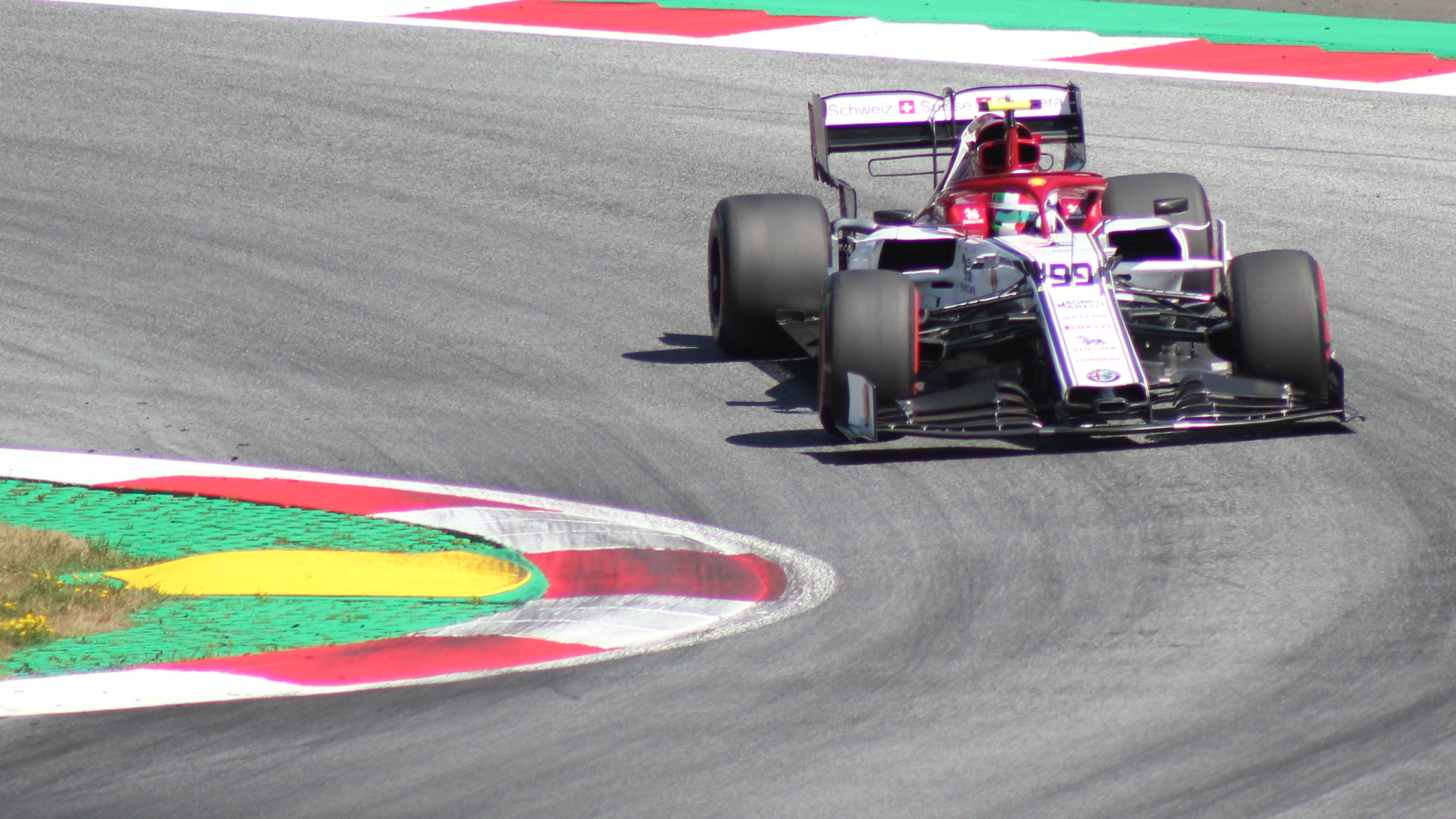
Antonio Giovinazzi during the Austrian Grand Prix, where he achieved his first career point in Formula One

The C38 returned to form in France where Räikkönen recorded another 7th-place finish, albeit with Giovinazzi a lowly 16th. The car achieved its first double points-finish of the season in Austria, where Räikkönen and Giovinazzi finished 9th and 10th respectively. This also marked the first point of Giovinazzi's Formula One career. The C38's first retirement of the season came at the following race in Britain, where Giovinazzi spun into a gravel trap after suffering a mechanical failure whilst running in 9th place. Räikkönen went on to score another points-finish with 8th place. At the German Grand Prix, the team recorded their best grid position of the season with Räikkönen qualifying 5th. During the rain-affected race, the C38 achieved its best combined finish of the season thus far when Räikkönen and Giovinazzi finished 7th and 8th respectively. However, after the race, the stewards found that the team had used a type of traction control during the race start, providing the drivers with an illegal advantage in the wet conditions. Both drivers were issued with 30-second time penalties, demoting them to 12th and 13th. Alfa Romeo later appealed the decision, however this appeal was rejected.

In Hungary, Giovinazzi started 17th after receiving a grid penalty for impeding another driver in qualifying. He failed to recover during the race and finished 18th, meanwhile Räikkönen scored another points-finish with 7th place.

=== Post-summer break rounds ===
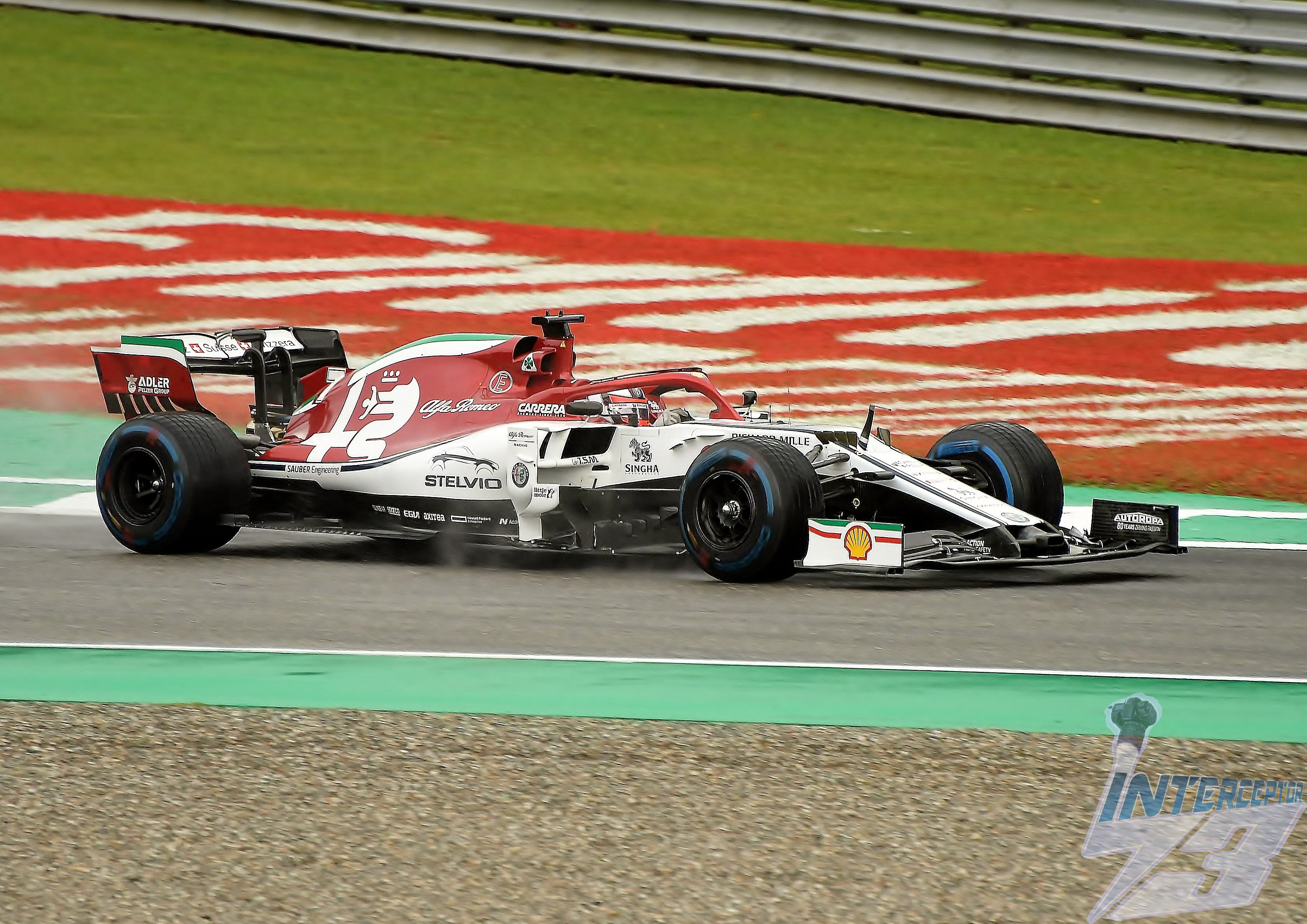
Räikkönen at the team's home race, the Italian Grand Prix

In Belgium, Räikkönen was involved in a first-lap collision and suffered a slow pit-stop when his front wing was replaced, eventually finishing 16th. Giovinazzi crashed out on the penultimate lap having been running in 9th place. In Italy, Räikkönen crashed heavily in qualifying, forcing him to start the race from the pit lane after damaged power unit components were replaced. He would only recover to 15th place by the end of the race. Giovinazzi scored a career best and second points-finish with 9th place. The C38 became the first Alfa Romeo Formula One car to lead a Grand Prix lap since the 1983 183T when Giovinazzi led the Singapore Grand Prix for four laps. He would go on to finish 10th. Meanwhile, Räikkönen was involved in a collision with Daniil Kvyat, breaking his suspension and forcing him to retire.

=== Closing rounds ===
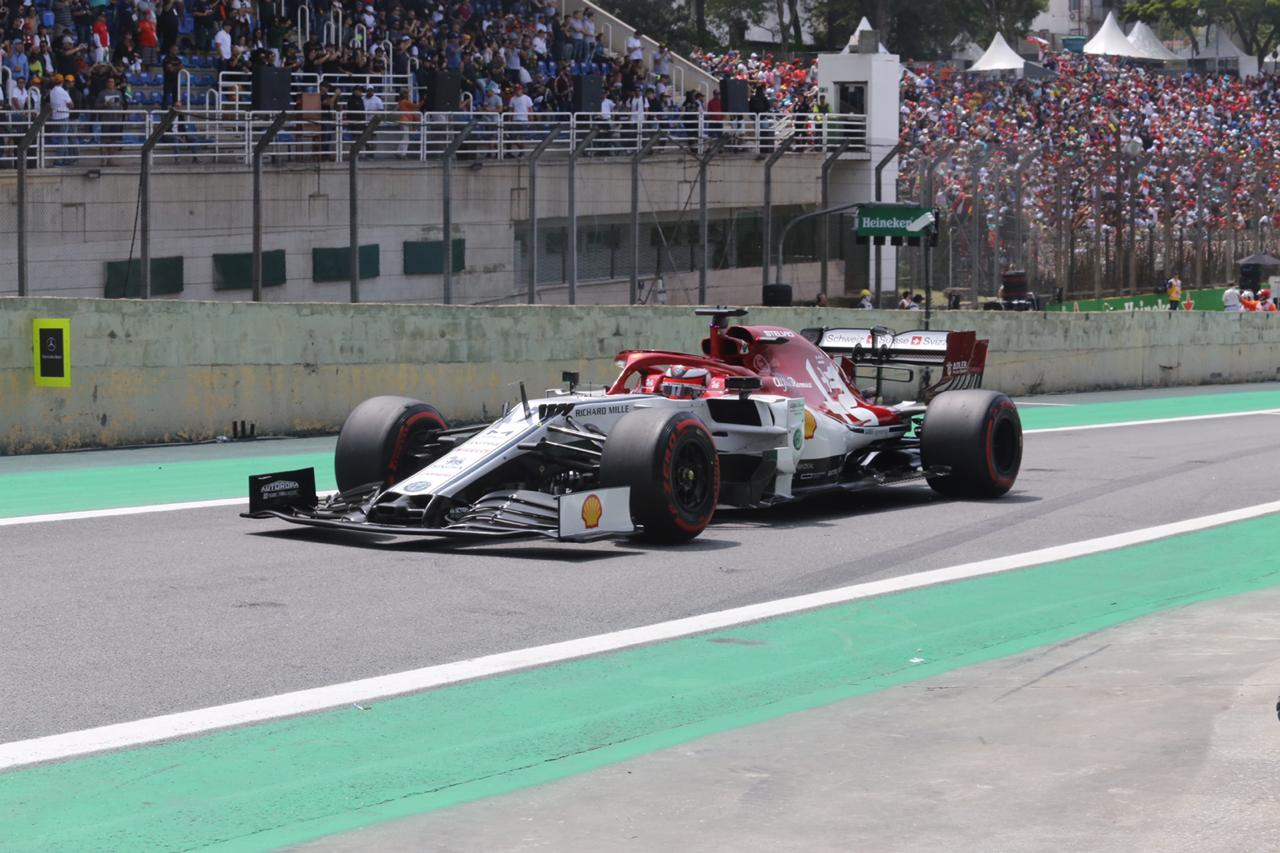
Räikkönen scored the best result of the season with fourth at the Brazilian Grand Prix

The C38 struggled at the next four races, failing to score points. Räikkönen's car retired from the Mexican Grand Prix with an overheating issue, and both cars were knocked out in Q1 in the United States. A successful result came at the chaotic Brazilian Grand Prix. Both drivers took advantage of retirements, collisions and penalties of cars ahead to score the C38's best result, with Räikkönen classified 4th and Giovinazzi 5th. The car returned to poor form at the season-ending Abu Dhabi Grand Prix, with both drivers failing to reach Q2 and to score points.

== Sponsorship and livery ==
At the Chinese Grand Prix, the car ran with an image of the 158 with which Giuseppe Farina won the first World Championship race. At the Italian Grand Prix, the car ran a special livery related to the Italian flag. There was an image of two Alfa Romeo cars: Räikkönen's car was a Stelvio while Giovinazzi's car was a Giulia.

== Complete Formula One results ==
(key)

Year	Entrant	Engine	Tyres	Drivers	Grands Prix																					Points	WCC
Year	Entrant	Engine	Tyres	Drivers	AUS	BHR	CHN	AZE	ESP	MON	CAN	FRA	AUT	GBR	GER	HUN	BEL	ITA	SIN	RUS	JPN	MEX	USA	BRA	ABU	Points	WCC
2019	Alfa Romeo Racing	Ferrari 064	P	(Italy) Antonio Giovinazzi	15	11	15	12	16	19	13	16	10	Ret	13	18	18^{†}	9	10	15	14	14	14	5	16	57	8th
2019	Alfa Romeo Racing	Ferrari 064	P	(Finland) Kimi Räikkönen	8	7	9	10	14	17	15	7	9	8	12	7	16	15	Ret	13	12	Ret	11	4	13	57	8th

^{†} Driver failed to finish the race, but was classified as they had completed over 90% of the winner's race distance.
