= Alfa Romeo C43 =

Formula One racing car

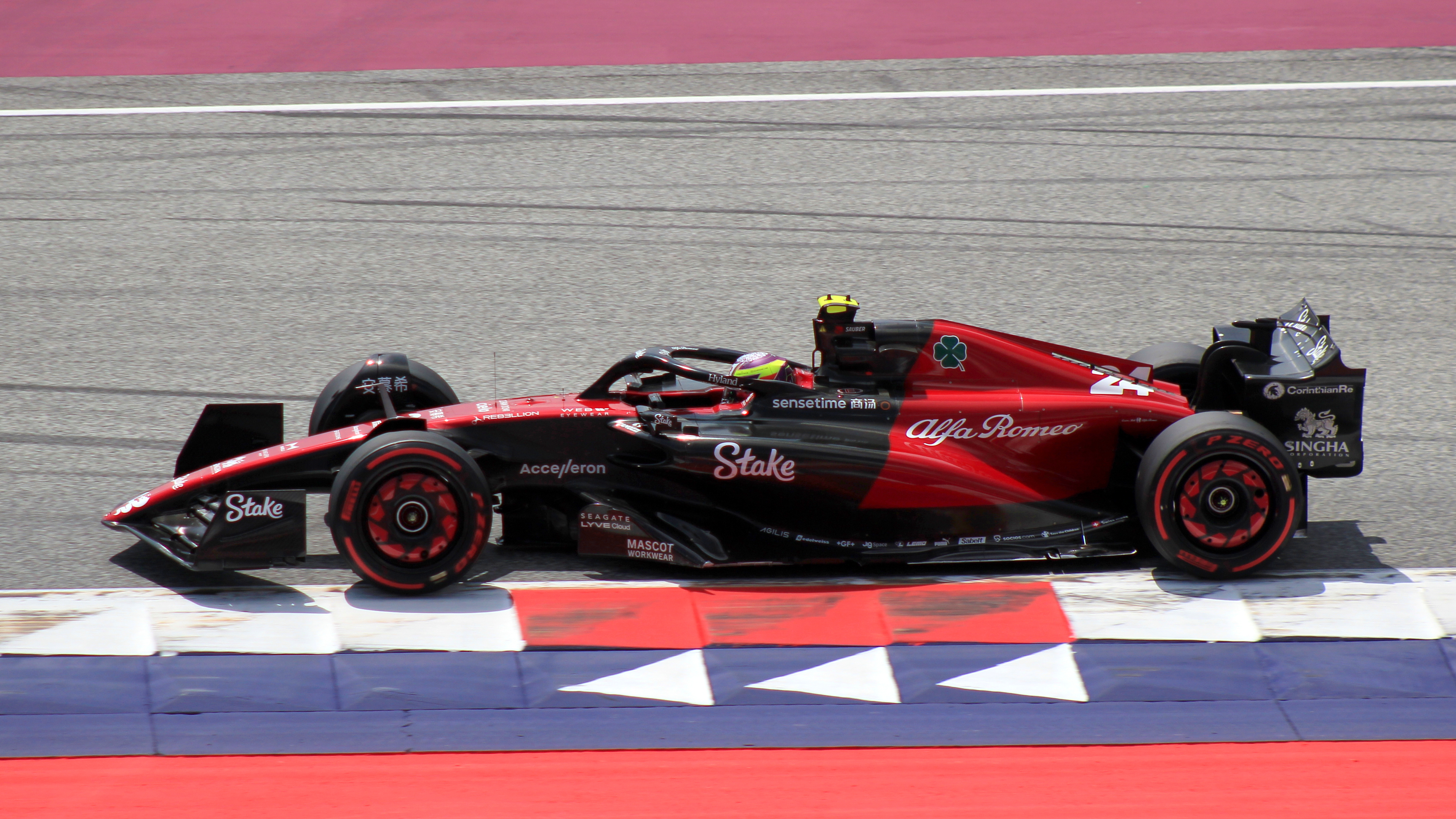
- Zhou Guanyu driving a C43 during the Austrian Grand Prix.
- Category: Formula One
- Constructor: Alfa Romeo
- Designers: Jan Monchaux (Technical Director); Eric Gandelin (Chief Designer); Lucia Conconi (Head of Vehicle Performance); Alessandro Cinelli (Head of Aerodynamics); Franck Sanchez (Chief Aerodynamicist)
- Predecessor: Alfa Romeo C42
- Successor: Kick Sauber C44

Technical specifications
- Suspension (front): Carbon fibre double wishbone, pushrod-activated inboard torsion springs, rockers and Öhlins damper units
- Suspension (rear): Carbon fibre double wishbone, pushrod-activated inboard torsion springs, rockers and Öhlins damper units
- Length: >5,500 mm (217 in)
- Width: 2,000 mm (79 in)
- Height: 970 mm (38 in)
- Wheelbase: ≤3,600 mm (142 in)
- Engine: Ferrari 1.6 L (98 cu in) direct injection V6 turbocharged engine limited to 15,000 RPM in a mid-mounted, rear-wheel drive layout 1.6 L (98 cu in) V6 (90°) turbocharged, 15,000 RPM limited mid-mounted.
- Electric motor: Ferrari Kinetic and thermal energy recovery systems
- Transmission: Alfa Romeo F1 Team Stake carbon fibre maincase with Ferrari cassette containing eight forward speeds and one reverse 8-speed + 1 reverse sequential seamless semi-automatic paddle shift with epicyclic differential and multi-plate limited slip clutch
- Battery: Lithium-ion battery
- Weight: 798 kg (1,759 lb)
- Fuel: Shell V-Power
- Lubricants: Shell Helix Ultra
- Brakes: Brembo brake calipers, carbon discs and pads, rear brake by wire control
- Tyres: Pirelli P Zero (dry); Pirelli Cinturato (wet)
- Clutch: Carbon Composite

Competition history
- Notable entrants: Alfa Romeo F1 Team Stake
- Notable drivers: 24. (China) Zhou Guanyu; 77. (Finland) Valtteri Bottas
- Debut: 2023 Bahrain Grand Prix
- Last event: 2023 Abu Dhabi Grand Prix
Races	Wins	Podiums	Poles	F/Laps
22	0	0	0	1

The Alfa Romeo C43 is a Formula One car designed and built by Alfa Romeo that competed in the 2023 Formula One World Championship.

The car was driven by Valtteri Bottas and Zhou Guanyu, both in their second year at the team.

== Design and development ==
=== Alfa Romeo withdrawal and partnernership end ===
On 26 August 2022, Alfa Romeo announced that they would leave Formula One at the end of 2023, ending their partnership with Sauber, making the C43 the last Sauber-engineered car to be badged as an Alfa Romeo. On 20 January 2023, it was announced that the C43 would be launched on 7 February.

=== Launch and livery ===
Alfa Romeo revealed their car design on 7 February 2023 via livestream. The car donned a new red-and-black livery, representing the departure of the previous year's title sponsor (Orlen Unipetrol) and the entry of global digital casino Stake.com taking said role. However, in countries where advertisement of gambling and sports betting is disallowed, and in the video game F1 23, Stake's branding was replaced by one of streaming website Kick. If both sponsorships were outlawed, and in its appearance in the video game F1 22, the Alfa Romeo logo was featured instead. The Kick sponsorship was first showcased at the 2023 Australian Grand Prix.

The C43s were run in special liveries; an Italian flag at the Italian Grand Prix and a casino themed-livery at the Las Vegas Grand Prix.

Prior to the season opener at Bahrain, the C43 was added to the video game F1 22.

== Season summary ==
=== First 10 races ===
Bottas qualified 12th for the season opener in Bahrain whilst Zhou qualified 13th. Bottas would have a brilliant race which included wheel to wheel battles with Fernando Alonso and George Russell resulting in an 8th place whilst Zhou would finish 16th after the team deliberately pitted him to set the fastest lap so he could take a point away from Pierre Gasly. Zhou qualified 12th in Jeddah whilst Bottas qualified 14th. Zhou finished 13th whilst Bottas finished a disappointing 18th one lap down.

Qualifying for the Australian Grand Prix was a nightmare as Zhou ended up 17th whilst Bottas ended up 19th. Both cars ran out of the points but a late red flag gave them a chance of points. The restart was chaotic with Zhou sitting in 10th after all the retirements and Bottas sitting in 12th but with Carlos Sainz receiving a penalty for a collision Zhou moved up to 9th scoring his first points of the season. The penalty however couldn't give Bottas points as he was classified 11th.

Qualifying for the first sprint weekend in Baku was a mixed bag with Zhou qualifying 16th and Bottas 14th with the first sprint qualifying ending up with Zhou 16th and Bottas 17th. Zhou would finish the sprint 12th with Bottas finishing 16th. Zhou would be forced to retire from the main race due to overheating whilst Bottas finished 18th and last, one lap down.

Zhou qualified 14th for the Miami Grand Prix whilst Bottas qualified 10th the team's first Q3 appearance of the season. Bottas would slip back to 13th place in the race whilst Zhou would finish 16th. Zhou would qualify 19th in Monaco whilst Bottas would qualify 15th. Bottas would finish 11th just missing out on points whilst Zhou would finish 13th.

Bottas qualified 16th for the Spanish Grand Prix whilst Zhou qualified 13th. Bottas would finish a disappointing 19th, one lap down but despite a small incident with Yuki Tsunoda where the Japanese driver pushed him off track Zhou would finish 9th his second points finish of the season. Zhou qualified 20th and last for the Canadian Grand Prix whilst Bottas qualified 15th. Zhou finished the race in 16th place whilst Bottas benefitted from George Russell's retirement to finish 10th, his first point since Bahrain.

Bottas qualified 14th for the Austrian Grand Prix whilst Zhou qualified 16th. Zhou also qualified 16th for the sprint whilst Bottas was a shocking 19th. Zhou would finish the sprint 19th whilst Bottas finished the shorter race 20th and last. Zhou would benefit from many post race penalties to end up to 12th place in the main race whilst Bottas finished 15th. Bottas would qualify 15th at Silverstone but would bee disqualified due to a lack fuel sending him to the back of the grid whilst Zhou had a quiet session qualifying 17th. Bottas would the race 12th whilst Zhou would finish 15th. The team ended the first 10 races 9th in the constructors' championship with 9 points with Bottas 16th in the drivers' championship with 5 points and Zhou 17th with 4 points.

=== Hungary to Japan ===
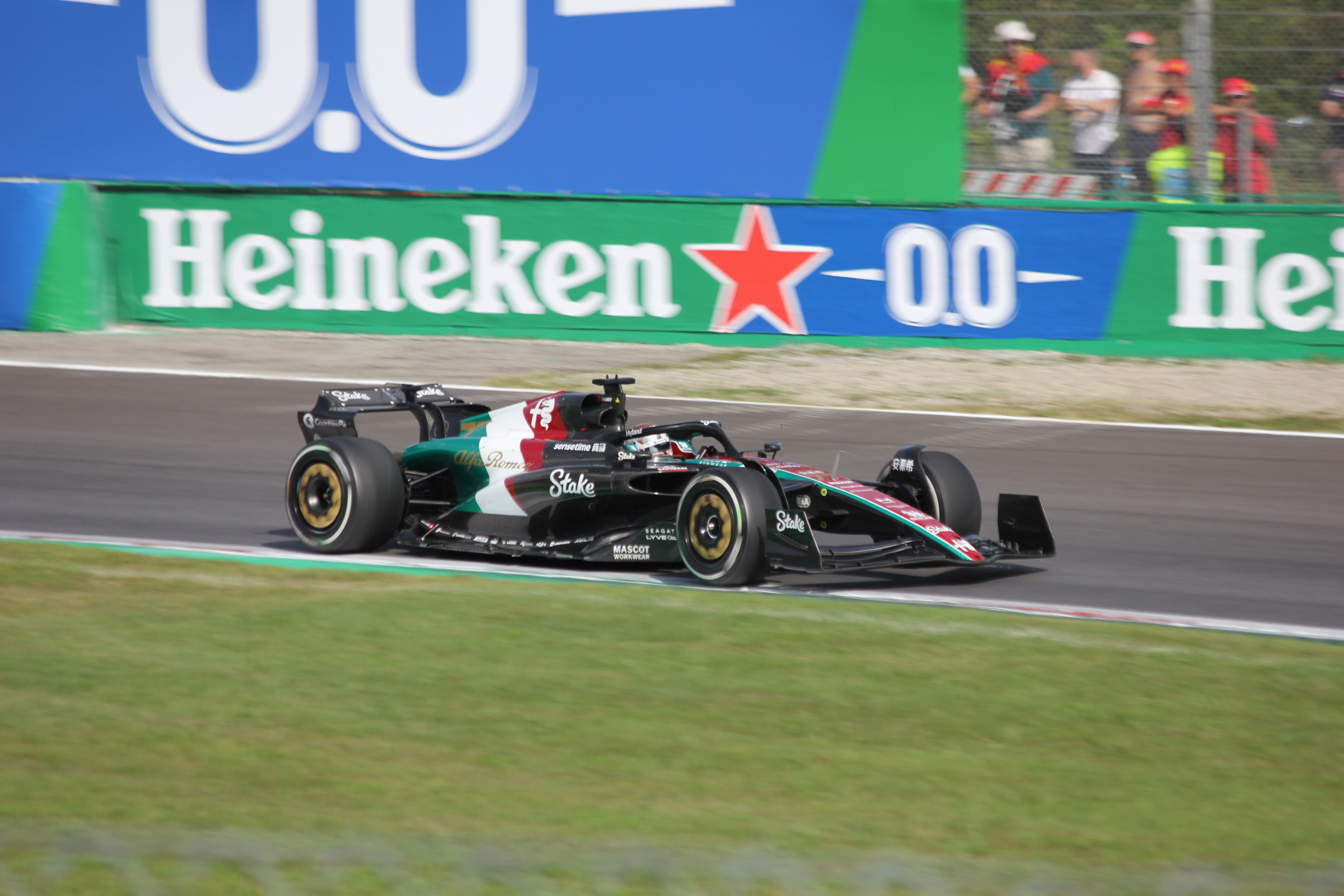
The C43 with a special livery at Monza

Zhou qualified 5th for the Hungarian Grand Prix, his best qualifying in his F1 career whilst Bottas qualified 7th, the team's first double Q3 appearance of the season. However the race was a disaster as Zhou got a poor start and whilst trying to make up for the start crashed into the back of Daniel Ricciardo sending the Alphatauri driver into Esteban Ocon who hit his teammate Pierre Gasly taking both Alpines out of the race. This earned Zhou a time penalty ending his chance for points so he finished 16th. Bottas would finish 12th for the second consecutive race ending a miserable race for Alfa Romeo.

Zhou qualified 16th for the Belgian Grand Prix whilst Bottas qualified 14th. Bottas would qualify 17th for the sprint whilst Zhou qualified 19th. Bottas finished the sprint 13th whilst Zhou finished 15th. Bottas finished the main race 12th for the third race in a row with Zhou one place behind in 13th. The team entered the summer break 9th in the championship still with 9 points.

At Zandvoort Zhou qualified 16th whilst Bottas qualified 19th. Zhou would retire late in the race after crashing heavily at turn 1 whilst Bottas finished 14th. Bottas qualified 14th for the Italian Grand Prix whilst Zhou qualified 16th. Zhou would finish 14th whilst Bottas finished 10th despite a late collision with Logan Sargeant scoring the team's first point since Canada.

Bottas qualified 16th in Singapore whilst Zhou qualified 19th. Bottas would retire from the race because due to his engine overheating whilst Zhou finished 12th. Bottas and Zhou qualified 16th and 19th respectively in Japan. Bottas would retire on lap 9 due to damage from Logan Sargeant hitting him on lap 5. Zhou would finish 13th. The team left Japan 9th in the championship on 10 points with Bottas 15th in the championship on 6 points and Zhou 17th on 4 points.

=== Qatar to Abu Dhabi ===
Bottas qualified 9th for the Qatar Grand Prix whilst Zhou qualified 20th and last. Bottas qualified 13th for the sprint with Zhou qualifying 15th. Bottas finished the sprint 10th with Zhou finishing 14th. In the main race both drivers benefitted from Carlos Sainz's failure to start, Lewis Hamilton and George Russell's turn 1 collision and many other drivers struggling with the extreme heat to finish in the points Bottas 8th and Zhou 9th. This marked the team's first double points finish since the 2022 Canadian Grand Prix. The double points finish moved the team up to 8th in the constructors' championship with 16 points 10 for Bottas and 6 for Zhou.

Zhou qualified 12th for the United States Grand Prix with Bottas one place behind in 13th. Bottas qualified 18th for the sprint with Zhou qualifying 15th. Bottas would pass Zhou to finish the sprint 16th with Zhou slipping back to 17th. Bottas would finish the main race 14th with Zhou finishing 15th but both would be promoted up two place when Lewis Hamilton and Charles Leclerc were disqualified for plank wear violations meaning Bottas was now classified 12th and Zhou classified 13th. but due to Yuki Tsunoda's 8th-place finish, AlphaTauri were now 6 points behind the team in the fight for 8th in the constructors' championship.

Bottas qualified 9th in Mexico with Zhou 10th; the team's second double Q3 appearance of the season. Zhou originally was knocked out of qualifying but Alex Albon's lap was deleted giving him a Q3 spot. The race however was a disaster as Bottas was fighting for point but would get a penalty for a late collision with Lance Stroll dropping from 13th to 15th with Zhou having a quiet race finishing in 14th. With Daniel Ricciardo finishing 7th, AlphaTauri jumped ahead of the team for 8th in the constructors' championship but only on countback.

Bottas qualified 18th for the São Paulo Grand Prix, with Zhou qualifying 20th and last. Zhou qualified 18th for the sprint and Bottas qualifying 14th. Zhou would finish the sprint 17th with Bottas 19th. In the main race with Charles Leclerc crashing out on the formation lap, Alex Albon and Kevin Magnussen's turn 1 crash and the two Mercedes lacking pace both drivers had a shock chance for points but Zhou would retire with engine problems and Bottas would retire with Hydraulic loss ending a miserable weekend for the team as they lost more ground to AlphaTauri in the fight for 8th in the standings. With the team running a special livery for the race Bottas would qualify 8th for the first ever Las Vegas Grand Prix with Zhou in 18th. Bottas, however, would receive front wing damage from Fernando Alonso spinning in front of him ending his chance for points. Zhou would have a quiet race finishing 15th with Bottas finishing 17th.

Bottas qualified 18th for the season finale in Abu Dhabi with Zhou one place behind in 19th. Bottas would spend the whole race fighting Kevin Magnussen for last place with both finishing a lap down but he came out on top finishing 19th. Zhou finished 17th ending a difficult season for Alfa Romeo but fortunately for the team Haas failed to score meaning the American team were unable to jump ahead of them for 9th in the teams' standings.

Alfa Romeo ended 2023 9th in the constructors' championship with 16 points compared to 6th place and 55 points in 2022 with Bottas scoring 8th in Bahrain and Qatar marking the team's best finish. This marked a disappointing season as many people viewed this as the team going backwards. This was due to the car being off the pace from the moment the season began especially in qualifying with Zhou's 5th and Bottas's 7th place qualifying at the Hungarian Grand Prix being the team's best grid positions that season. Bottas ended up 15th in the drivers' championship with 10 points compared to 10th in the drivers' championship with 49 points in 2022. Zhou finished 18th in the drivers' championship with 6 points the same as 2022.

Alfa Romeo left F1 at the end of 2023 with the team expected to revert to the Sauber branding for 2024.

== Complete Formula One results ==
Key

Key
Colour	Result
Gold	Winner
Silver	Second place
Bronze	Third place
Green	Other points position
Blue	Other classified position
Blue	Not classified, finished (NC)
Purple	Not classified, retired (Ret)
Red	Did not qualify (DNQ)
Black	Disqualified (DSQ)
White	Did not start (DNS)
White	Race cancelled (C)
Blank	Did not practice (DNP)
Blank	Excluded (EX)
Blank	Did not arrive (DNA)
Blank	Withdrawn (WD)
Blank	Did not enter (empty cell)
Annotation	Meaning
P	Pole position
F	Fastest lap
Superscript number	Points-scoring position in sprint

Year	Entrant	Power unit	Tyres	Driver name	Grands Prix																						Points	WCC pos.
Year	Entrant	Power unit	Tyres	Driver name	BHR	SAU	AUS	AZE	MIA	MON	ESP	CAN	AUT	GBR	HUN	BEL	NED	ITA	SIN	JPN	QAT	USA	MXC	SAP	LVG	ABU	Points	WCC pos.
2023	Alfa Romeo F1 Team Stake	Ferrari 066/10	P	(Finland) Valtteri Bottas	8	18	11	18	13	11	19	10	15	12	12	12	14	10	Ret	Ret	8	12	15	Ret	17	19	16	9th
2023	Alfa Romeo F1 Team Stake	Ferrari 066/10	P	(China) Zhou Guanyu	16^{F}	13	9	Ret	16	13	9	16	12	15	16	13	Ret	14	12	13	9	13	14	Ret	15	17	16	9th
