= Sauber C37 =

2018 Formula One racing car

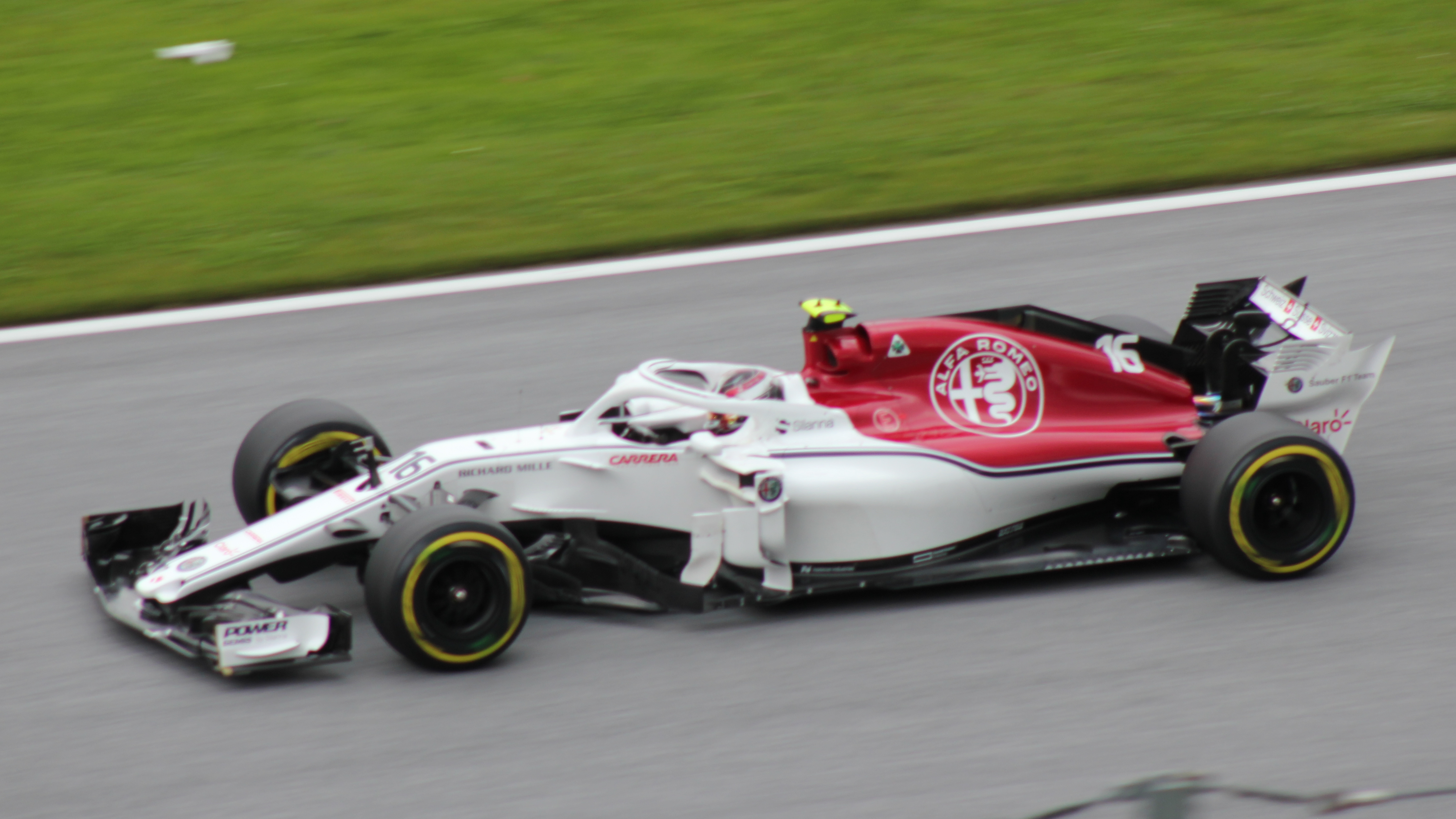
- Charles Leclerc driving a C37 at the Austrian Grand Prix
- Category: Formula One
- Constructor: Sauber
- Designers: Jörg Zander (Technical Director); Luca Furbatto (Chief Designer); Ian Wright (Head of Vehicle Performance); Nicolas Hennel (Head of Aerodynamics); Mariano Alperin (Head of Aerodynamic Development)
- Predecessor: Sauber C36
- Successor: Alfa Romeo Racing C38

Technical specifications
- Engine: Ferrari 062 EVO 1.6 L (98 cu in) direct injection V6 turbocharged engine limited to 15,000 rpm in a mid-mounted, rear-wheel drive layout
- Electric motor: Ferrari kinetic and thermal energy recovery systems
- Transmission: Eight forward and one reverse gears
- Weight: 733 kg (1,616.0 lb)
- Fuel: Shell V-Power
- Tyres: Pirelli P Zero (dry); Pirelli Cinturato (wet)

Competition history
- Notable entrants: Alfa Romeo Sauber F1 Team
- Notable drivers: 9. (Sweden) Marcus Ericsson; 16. (Monaco) Charles Leclerc
- Debut: 2018 Australian Grand Prix
- Last event: 2018 Abu Dhabi Grand Prix
| Races | Wins | Podiums | Poles | F/Laps |
|---|---|---|---|---|
| 21 | 0 | 0 | 0 | 0 |

The Sauber C37 is a Formula One racing car designed and constructed by Sauber to compete during the 2018 FIA Formula One World Championship. The car was driven by Marcus Ericsson and reigning Formula 2 champion Charles Leclerc, who replaced Pascal Wehrlein. The C37 made its competitive début at the 2018 Australian Grand Prix and uses a 2018-specification Ferrari engine. This was the last car to be raced under the Sauber name until 2024 as they were renamed as Alfa Romeo for the 2019 season, although the team's structure remained unchanged.

The chassis was designed by Jörg Zander, Luca Furbatto, Ian Wright and Nicolas Hennel with the car being powered with a customer Ferrari powertrain.

== Design and development ==
=== Engine supply ===
The car was originally intended to use an engine supplied by Honda until the team underwent a reorganisation of its management structure and the agreement was abandoned. After using year-old Ferrari engines in 2017, Sauber renegotiated with Ferrari and secured current-specification engines as part of an agreement with sister marque Alfa Romeo.

== Season summary ==
Ericsson during the Spanish Grand Prix where he finished 13th.

Sauber finished the season in eighth in the Constructors' Championship with 48 points. Their best finish in 2018 was sixth place courtesy of Leclerc at the Azerbaijan Grand Prix.

== Sponsorship and livery ==
Following the sponsorship agreement with Alfa Romeo which led various insiders, mainly Italians, to colloquially (but improperly) identify the single-seater as "Alfa Sauber", the livery of the C37 abandoned the light blue of the previous seasons and adopted a new colour. The car is mostly white and has a large racing red area in the upper two thirds of the engine cover, which also envelops the air intake. Along the entire length of the car, from the tip of the nose, on the sidepods, up to the rear suspension attachments, there are two thin blue stripes of unequal size, the lower one wider, the upper one narrower; the fin, the bottom and the front and rear wings are black (except for the external parts of the bulkheads of the latter, which are white). Finally, the upper part of the mobile wing of the DRS is white, while the lower one is red and has the word "Alfa Romeo" written in italics.

A simplified version of the Alfa Romeo logo stands out on the engine cover, while the Quadrifoglio Verde is present on the side of the air intake.

== Complete Formula One results ==
(key) (results in bold indicate pole position; results in italics indicate fastest lap)

| Year | Entrant | Engine | Tyres | Drivers | Grands Prix | | | | | | | | | | | | | | | | | | | | | Points | WCC |
| Year | Entrant | Engine | Tyres | Drivers | AUS | BHR | CHN | AZE | ESP | MON | CAN | FRA | AUT | GBR | GER | HUN | BEL | ITA | SIN | RUS | JPN | USA | MEX | BRA | ABU | Points | WCC |
|---|---|---|---|---|---|---|---|---|---|---|---|---|---|---|---|---|---|---|---|---|---|---|---|---|---|---|---|
| 2018 | Alfa Romeo Sauber F1 Team | Ferrari 062 EVO | **P** | (Sweden) Marcus Ericsson | Ret | 9 | 16 | 11 | 13 | 11 | 15 | 13 | 10 | Ret | 9 | 15 | 10 | 15 | 11 | 13 | 12 | 10 | 9 | Ret | Ret | 48 | 8th |
| 2018 | Alfa Romeo Sauber F1 Team | Ferrari 062 EVO | **P** | (Monaco) Charles Leclerc | 13 | 12 | 19 | 6 | 10 | 18^{†} | 10 | 10 | 9 | Ret | 15 | Ret | Ret | 11 | 9 | 7 | Ret | Ret | 7 | 7 | 7 | 48 | 8th |

^{†} Driver failed to finish the race, but was classified as they had completed over 90% of the winner's race distance.
