= Exoès =

Exoès is a French company based in the city of Gradignan in the region of Bordeaux. Exoès was founded by Arnaud Desrentes, Rémi Daccord, and Thiébaut Kientz. It targets renewable energy and energy efficiency. It specializes in the transformation of heat into power, such as mechanical or electric energy via the Rankine cycles. The company is supported by BPI France, ADEME, the European funds (FEDER), the French Ministry of Higher Education and Research, and the Aquitaine and Poitou-Charentes regions.

== History ==
In November 2011, Exoès established offices in Gradignan.

In July 2011, the company raised 1.1 million Euros.

On the 18 November 2013, Exoès signed with Tenneco, the world’s second largest exhaust system supplier. Tenneco chose Exoès to work on a solution for an exhaust heat recovery system based on the Rankine systems.

== Products ==
=== EVE (Energy Via Exhaust) ===
Exoès developed a solution to recover energy contained in the hot gases expelled from the exhaust pipe of a vehicle. Their product, EVE, results in potential fuel savings for all vehicles that have a thermal engine. EVE is a form of heat exchanger that is installed on the exhaust pipe. A pressurized liquid is pumped through this exchanger where the high temperature causes it to vaporize. The vaporized liquid pushes a compact piston that powers an alternator and creates electricity. The system is the size of an air conditioning compressor. Using the generated energy, the vehicle has the ability to move the first 100 meters entirely with electricity.

=== SHAPE Solar ===
The company developed SHAPE Solar (Sustainable Heat And Power Engine), a power plant system on a domestic scale capable of simultaneously producing electricity and heat. To accomplish this, the power plant uses a Rankine engine. A solar concentration power plant consists of mirrors that concentrate the sun’s rays to create a high temperature. At the beginning of the cycle, the heat radiates from the solar power plant and warms a fluid by a thermal exchange which transformed into pressurized steam. The fluid is then directed towards the SHAPE engine. This pressurized steam generates electricity using an alternator.

At the engine outlet, the steam is directed towards a heat exchanger, which is coupled to a hot water network. At the end of the circuit, the steam returns to a liquid state and is injected back into the solar field. The heat from the solar field vaporizes the newly condensed water and injects it back into the engine, allowing the cycle to repeat.

== Awards and recognition ==
This process is a 2010 Prize-winner of the national competition of the Ministry of Higher Education and Research in the Creation Development category.

This process garnered trophies at the 2011 Poitou-Charentes eco-industries competition and a trophy of innovation from the CGPME in the first edition of Innov' CGPME.
