= Exhaust heat recovery system =

Automotive technology

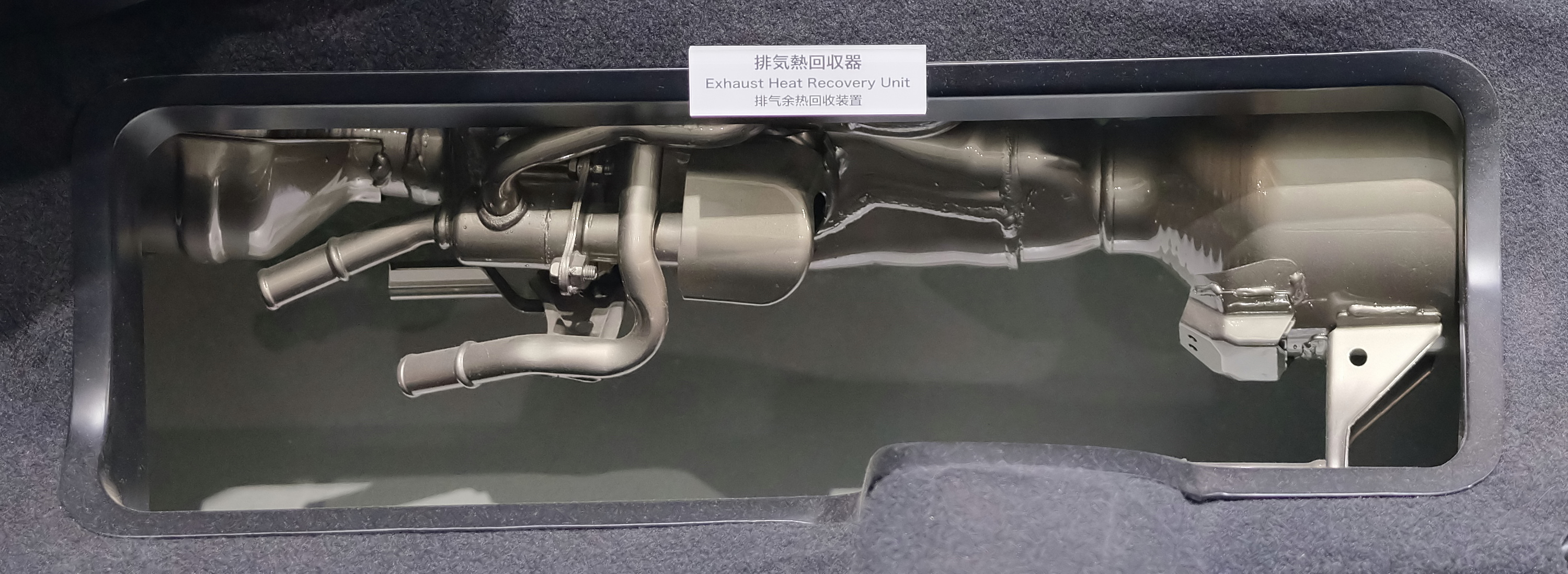
Exhaust heat recovery unit in Toyota Prius PHV

An exhaust heat recovery system turns waste heat energy in exhaust gases into electric energy for batteries or mechanical energy reintroduced on the crankshaft. The technology is of increasing interest as car and heavy-duty vehicle manufacturers continue to increase efficiency, saving fuel and reducing emissions.

== Thermal losses of an internal combustion engine ==
While technological improvements have greatly reduced the fuel consumption of internal combustion engines, the peak thermal efficiency of a 4-stroke Otto cycle engine is around 35%, which means that 65% of the energy released from the fuel is lost as heat. High speed Diesel cycle engines fare better with around 45% peak efficiency, but are still far from the maximum theoretical efficiency, with 55% of the fuel energy content rejected as heat.

== Exhaust heat recovery technologies ==
=== Rankine ===
Rankine cycle systems vaporize pressurised water using a steam generator located in the exhaust pipe. As a result of the heating by exhaust gases, the fluid is turned into steam. The steam then drives the expander of the Rankine engine, either a turbine or pistons. This expander can be directly tied to the crankshaft of the thermal engine or linked to an alternator to generate electricity.

UK researchers at Loughborough University and the University of Sussex concluded that waste heat from light-duty vehicle engines in a steam power cycle could deliver fuel economy advantages of 6.3% – 31.7%, depending upon drive cycle, and that high efficiencies can be achieved at practical operating pressures.

=== Thermoelectric generators (TEG) ===
A second technology, thermoelectric generators (Seebeck-, Peltier-, Thomson effects) is also an option to recover heat from the exhaust pipe, but has not been put to practical use in modern cars.

== Exhaust heat recovery on internal-combustion engines with Rankine-cycle systems ==
=== Passenger cars ===
As regulations concerning CO_{2} emissions become more stringent, recovering exhaust heat becomes more practical. Numerous companies develop systems based upon the Rankine cycle:

==== BMW ====
The German company has been one of the first to study exhaust heat recovery, with a Rankine system called Turbosteamer.

==== Chevrolet EGHR ====
The 2016 Chevrolet Malibu Hybrid car features an exhaust gas heat recovery (EGHR) system to accelerate coolant warm-up time. This provides faster warming of the engine to reach optimal temperature. Less fuel is used, reducing emissions. This also quickens cabin heating for passenger comfort and window defrosting. For hybrid applications, it also can warm the battery pack. The cooling system is connected to a heat exchanger placed in the exhaust gas, transferring the thermal energy from the exhaust gas to the cooling system. When the engine reaches optimal temperature, exhaust gas bypasses the heat exchanger.

==== Honda ====
Honda also develops a module based on the Rankine cycle, using engine waste heat to produce electricity for the battery pack.

==== Exoès ====
A French company, Exoès, is specialized in designing and manufacturing exhaust-heat recovery systems based on the Rankine cycles. The system EVE, Energy Via Exhaust, leads to fuel savings from 5 up to 15%.

==== Barber-Nichols ====
Barber-Nichols Inc. develops Rankine technologies for vehicles.

==== FVV ====
The German consortium unites the majority of internal-combustion engine manufacturers across the world. Two task forces are currently studying exhaust-heat recovery systems on passenger cars.

=== Trucks ===
Renault Trucks: As a part of the All for Fuel Eco Initiative, Renault Trucks studies a Rankine system for long distance vehicles that could lead to 10% fuel savings.

=== WildFire Heat Recovery System (WFHRS) ===
Double Arrow Engineerings' WildFire Heat Recovery System (WFHRS) is under development and uses waste heat from both coolant and exhaust. This system uses a Rankine engine and mechanically adds power back to the drivetrain. The WFHRS is designed for a variety of different applications, for both fixed and variable rotational speeds and for aftermarket and OEM applications, but it is generally geared toward larger equipment such as large highway trucks, diesel generators, large buses and motor-homes, marine vessels, medium duty trucks, etc.

=== Trains ===
IFPEN, Enogia and Alstom are developing a system called Trenergy, dedicated to improve train fuel efficiency.

=== Exhaust heat recovery in sport ===
Fuel efficiency, reduction of CO_{2} emissions, reliability, and costs are necessary parts of Formula 1 manufacturers’ strategies. Automobile sport is also a good place to trial and assess technologies that, once made reliable, and with costs reduced by experience in production, can be adapted to private cars. Formula 1 constructors produced one of the first exhaust-heat recovery systems, and these devices are essential parts of embedded technologies on F1. Heat recovery was scheduled to become mandatory in the 2014 F1 Championship.
