= Nicolas Hennel =

French engineer

- Born: Nicolas Gyorgy Hennel de Beaupreau; 21 July 1973 (age 52); Suresnes, France
- Occupation: Aerodynamicist
- Employer: Haas F1 Team
- Title: Aerodynamics consultant

Nicolas Gyorgy Hennel de Beaupreau (born 21 July 1973) is a French Formula One aerodynamicist. He is currently an aerodynamic consultant for Haas F1 Team, and previously lead the aerodynamics team at Sauber Motorsport, Lotus F1 Team and Scuderia Ferrari.

== Career ==
Hennel began his Formula One career in 1997 as an aerodynamicist with Benetton Formula in Enstone, working on wind tunnel and computational fluid dynamics development. In 2000, he joined Scuderia Ferrari as a CFD aerodynamicist, contributing to the aerodynamic development of the team’s cars in Maranello.

In 2003, Hennel moved back to the Enstone-based organisation now competing as Renault F1 Team, where he served as Aerodynamics Team Leader, leading one of the two main aerodynamic development groups during the team’s championship-winning period. He joined McLaren Racing in 2006 as Principal Aerodynamicist, before briefly moving to Toyota F1 Team in 2009 as New Car managing, overseeing development of the stillborn Toyota TF110 project. After Toyota withdrew from the sport, Hennel returned to Ferrari as Principal Aerodynamicist, and was subsequently promoted to Chief Aerodynamicist in 2012, leading aerodynamic development of the team’s 2013 Formula One challenger.

In 2013, Hennel rejoined the Enstone-based Lotus F1 Team as Head of Aerodynamics, where he led the aerodynamic department until 2016. He moved to Sauber Motorsport in 2016 as Head of Aerodynamics, and was later appointed Chief Aerodynamicist in 2018, overseeing aerodynamic development at the Hinwil-based team through to 2021.

Following his departure from Sauber, Hennel founded Beaupreau Aero Solutions Ltd in 2022, providing aerodynamic engineering consultancy services, and has since worked as a consultant for the Haas F1 Team.
