= Lucia Conconi =

Italian engineer

- Citizenship: Italian
- Education: Polytechnic University of Milan
- Occupation: Engineer
- Years active: 2004 - 2025
- Known for: Formula One Engineer

Lucia Conconi is an Italian Formula One and motorsport engineer. She was formally the Head of Vehicle Performance for Sauber Motorsport and has also served in senior engineering roles at Renault F1 Team, Lotus F1 Team, Mercedes-AMG F1 Team and Brawn GP.

== Career ==
Conconi studied aerospace engineering at the Polytechnic University of Milan, graduating in 1998. She began her career in Italy with CSI SpA. in Milan, where she worked as a test engineer before becoming Head of the Testing Laboratory. In this role she oversaw experimental validation programmes and performance testing for automotive applications, developing expertise in data analysis, rig testing, and correlation between simulation and physical measurement. In 2004 she joined Audi Sport GmbH in Ingolstadt, working on vehicle dynamics simulation and testing across the manufacturer’s DTM and Le Mans Prototype programmes. Her work combined trackside support with factory-based simulation activities, contributing to performance optimisation and development testing.

Conconi moved into Formula One in 2008 with Honda Racing F1 in Brackley as a Senior Ride Analysis Engineer and team leader. Following Honda’s withdrawal, she remained with the team through its transition into Brawn GP and subsequently Mercedes-AMG F1 Team, focusing on vertical dynamics optimisation, systems development, and data-driven performance analysis. In 2011 she joined the Lotus Renault F1 Team as Suspension Section Leader, continuing in this position through its iterations as Lotus F1 Team and later Renault F1 Team. She led programmes relating to suspension performance, vehicle modelling, and correlation between simulation tools and track behaviour.

In 2019 Conconi moved to Sauber Motorsport, competing as Alfa Romeo Racing, as Head of Vehicle Performance. There she directed departments responsible for performance integration, vehicle dynamics, tyre analysis, and simulation, helping to expand the team’s data-driven development capabilities.

Conconi departed the team at the start of 2025 and subsequently moved into engineering consultancy, focusing on performance strategy and organisational development within high-technology industries.
