= Luca Furbatto =

Italian engineer

- Born: 11 May 1972 (age 54); Turin
- Citizenship: Italian, British
- Education: Politecnico di Torino; University of Leeds
- Occupation: Engineer
- Employer: Aston Martin F1 Team
- Known for: Formula One engineer
- Title: Engineering director

Luca Furbatto (born 11 May 1972) is an Italian Formula One engineer. He is currently the engineering director at the Aston Martin Formula One team.

== Biography ==
After working, he graduated in Mechanical Engineering at the Politecnico di Torino in Italy and the University of Leeds in the UK. Furbatto started work for the Tyrrell rebranded BAR F1 team as a performance engineer. He started working with the test team and then moved over to the race squad, before departing in the year 2000 for Toyota Motorsport.

In 2001, he moved to McLaren Racing, where he worked as Head of Materials, growing the department exponentially and working on race winning machinery. He was promoted to project manager where he played a crucial role in the design of the 2010 and 2011 McLaren cars under the supervision of Paddy Lowe, before departing the team at the end of 2011 for Toro Rosso.

At Toro Rosso Furbatto took up the position of Chief Designer, where he remained for three years. After a brief stint back with McLaren working on their GT series entries, he was back as a Chief Designer for the Manor Team. He joined during the 2015 reshuffle and took responsibility for the 2016 designs. It was a better year for the squad, but money troubles continued to plague Manor and they folded ahead of the 2017 season. In June 2017 he joined Sauber Motorsport as Chief Designer. He then became the Chief Designer at the Alfa Romeo Formula One team. Furbatto moved to join Aston Martin F1 as their new Engineering Director at the start of 2022.
