= Jan Monchaux =

French engineer

- Born: 4 June 1978 (age 48); Blois, France
- Occupation: Engineer
- Employer: Fédération Internationale de l'Automobile
- Known for: Motorsport engineer
- Title: Technical director

Jan Monchaux (born 4 June 1978) is a French and German Formula One engineer.

== Biography ==
Monchaux graduated in aerodynamics at the National School of Aerodynamics in Toulouse he also studied at Imperial College London. He started his career in Formula 1 in 2002 for the Toyota Racing team, where he served as aerodynamics leader until 2009. Between January 2010 and December 2012, Monchaux worked at Ferrari, also as one of the leaders in the aerodynamics department of the Italian team. In early 2013, he went to Audi Sport, where he was responsible for the aerodynamics department and remained there until he announced, in April 2018, his transfer to the Sauber Formula 1 team becoming the new head of aerodynamics at the Swiss team. On 17 July 2019 The Alfa Romeo F1 Team Stake team announced that Monchaux would replace Simone Resta as the team's technical director. On 07 June 2023 Alfa Romeo Racing announced that Monchaux would be replaced by James Key.

On 13 February 2024 Monchaux was announced as the FIA's single seater technical director which will see him working on current and future F1 technical matters. He will report to Nikolas Tombazis who is the FIA's single seater director.
