= Shell V-Power =

Motor fuel brand of Shell plc

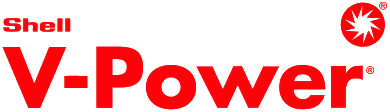

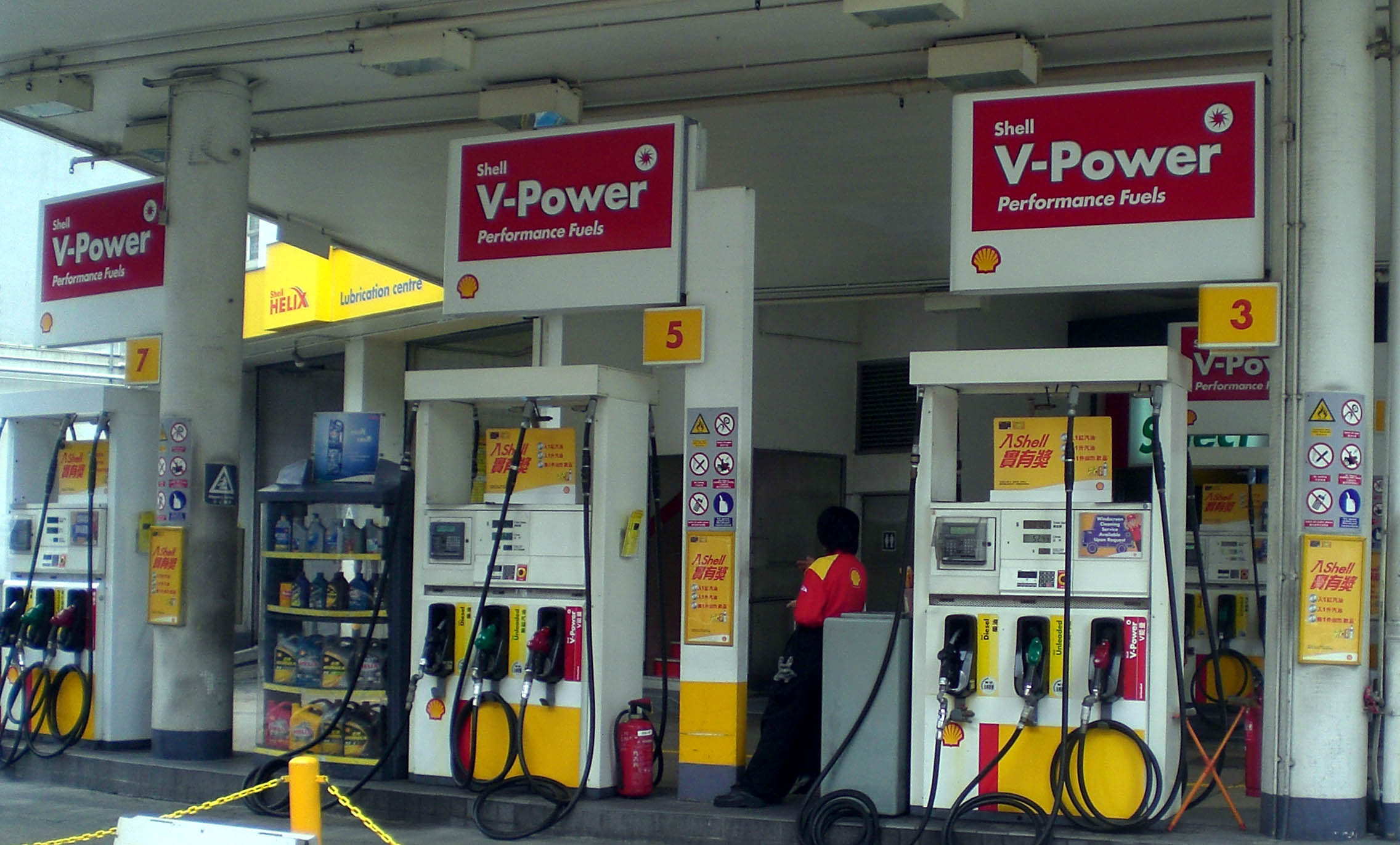
- Shell petrol station in Hong Kong displaying the "V-Power" brand, pictured in 2009
- Product type: Fuel
- Current owner: Shell plc
- Country: Netherlands and United Kingdom
- Introduced: 2001; 25 years ago
- Markets: Worldwide
- Tagline: "Actively cleans as you drive", among others
- Website: shell.us/vpower

Shell V-Power is the brand name given to Shell's enhanced high specification fuels for road motor vehicles including "Shell V-Power Nitro+" and "Shell V-Power Diesel". Introduced in Italy in 2001, Shell relaunched the fuel in March 2008, under the name Nitrogen-Enriched Shell V-Power, with nitrogen-containing detergents.

Initially used for higher octane Super Unleaded petrol/gasoline (formerly known as Optimax in some regions), it is now additionally used for high specification diesel fuel.

The brand is also used for Shell's energy drinks.

== V-Power Petrol ==
Petrol or gasoline is assessed, categorised and sold by an octane rating. Generally, in most areas of the world, the Research Octane Number (RON) is used, but in North America, the Anti-Knock Index (AKI) is used. Conventional 'standard' "Super Unleaded" petrol in Europe, South Asia and Australia has an octane rating of 95 RON, and in North America "Premium Unleaded" is AKI/RdON/PON 91–93 (RON 96–98). However, higher octane "Super Plus Unleaded" – often formulated with higher quality additives, is usually set at around 98 RON in mainland Europe; but this can vary by market. Most oil and petroleum companies now market their own Super Plus Unleaded petrols under a unique name – and the current name for Shell Super Unleaded fuel is "V-Power". Like most Super Plus Unleaded petrols, V-Power also contains higher concentrations of detergents and other additives to help clean the engine and smooth its operation.

In the United Kingdom and Denmark (where Super Plus Unleaded must be a minimum of 97 RON), V-Power has a rating of 99 RON (whereas V-Power's predecessor Shell Optimax was rated at 98 RON). There are two other 99 RON fuels available in the UK, namely Tesco Momentum99 and more recently Esso Synergy Supreme+ 99.

In the Netherlands, V-Power used to have a 95 RON rating, although officials from Shell stated it effectively had a 97 RON rating. Due to the limited categories of 92 RON, 95 RON, 98 RON and 100 RON, it was officially rated at 95. These days, the RON rating of the V-power petrol in the Netherlands is rated at 98.

In Germany, all Shell stations offer V-Power Racing 100, rated at 100 RON. In Greece, all Shell stations offer V-Power rated at 97 RON. Most Shell stations also offer V-Power Racing (100 RON).

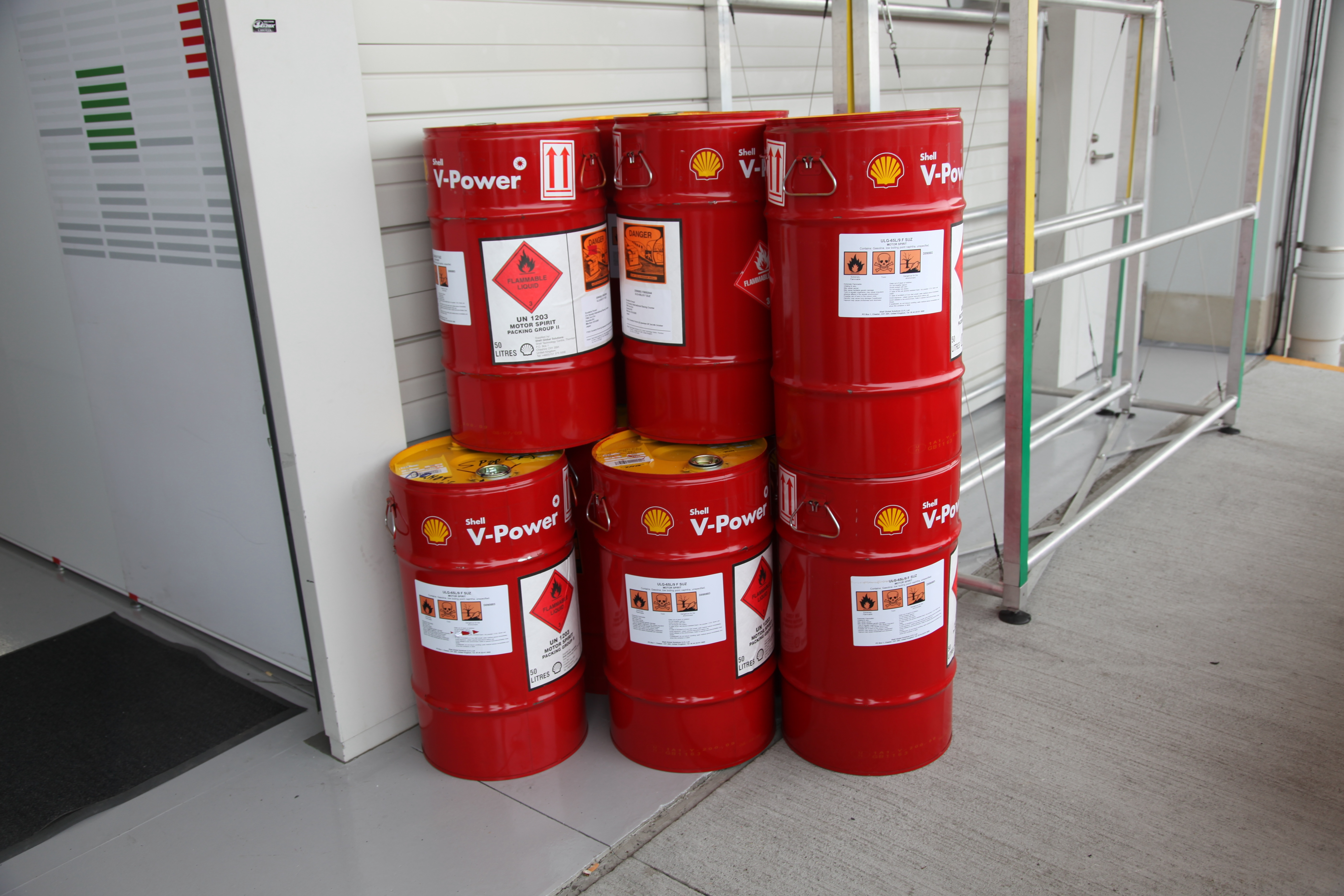
V-Power barrels for the Scuderia Ferrari at the 2009 Japanese Grand Prix

In Australia, from October 2006, Shell and Coles Express re-branded Optimax to V-Power (98 RON). V-Power Racing, the ultra-high performance variant has a rating of 100 RON although Shell decided to phase out V-Power Racing from 21 July to mid August 2008, instead recommending V-Power. The previously obtainable higher grade V-Power Racing which contained 5% ethanol to boost V-Power's octane rating to 100 RON has now been phased out by Shell due to a "changing market".

In the United States, in around 2004, all Shell "Premium" gas was rebranded as "V-Power". In 2015, Shell re-branded V-Power to the newly launched V-Power Nitro+.

In Canada, from June 2005, Shell Canada re-branded Optimax Gold to V-Power. In 2015, Shell Canada re-branded V-Power to V-Power Nitro+.

In Hong Kong, as there is no oil refinery plant, gasoline was imported from Singapore, which is 98 RON. However, V-Power sold in gas stations was rumoured to reach 167 RON (the highest native RON for consumer grade commercial petrol worldwide). Such a figure was not supported by any actual test, nor was it confirmed by Shell and was contradicted by a report of the Legislative Council of Hong Kong.

In New Zealand, from 2007, Shell rebranded 95 Premium Unleaded as V-Power. It was still rated at 95 RON. Shell sold its New Zealand retail operations in 2010, to a consortium which later became Z Energy, and upon re-branding Shell V-Power was replaced with ZX Premium Unleaded.

In Sweden, Shell V-Power was previously 99 RON, but is now been re-branded under the new owner St1 from June 2011, to "Shell V-Power E5" making it 98 RON with a mix of 5% ethanol.

In Argentina, V-Power is the grade 3 fuel sold by Shell, rated at 98 RON. In the Philippines, Pilipinas Shell launches the new Shell V-Power (replacing Shell Velocity) in 2006. On June 1, 2012, Shell Philippines launches the premium fuel grade, Shell V-Power Nitro+ Gasoline (formerly Shell Super Premium) and Shell V-Power Nitro+ Racing (formerly Shell V-Power). In Indonesia, from April 2013, Shell rebranded 95 Super Extra as V-Power with additional additives. While it is still rated at 95 RON.

In Malaysia & Singapore, it is RON98, the octane is higher for V-Power Racing. In Philippines, on June 8, 2017, V-Power Nitro+ was replaced with V-Power with Dynaflex technology. In Russia, all Shell stations offer V-Power rated 95 RON, some stations also offer V-Power Racing (98 RON).

== V-Power Diesel ==
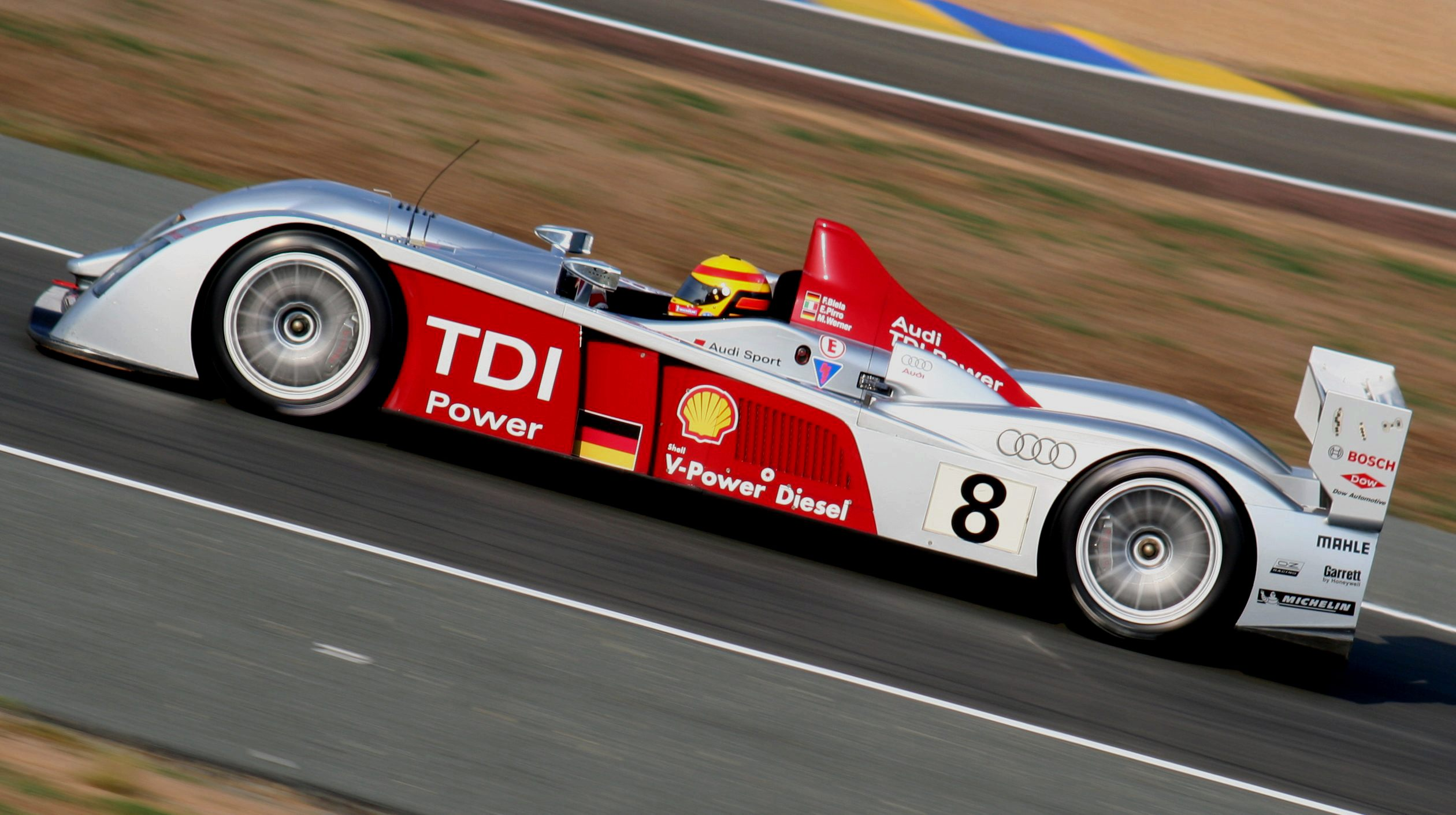
An Audi R10 TDI LMP race car, fueled on Shell V-Power Diesel

V-Power Diesel is Shell's version of an enhanced diesel fuel, similar to BP's 'Ultimate Diesel'. Like BP Ultimate Diesel, Shell V-Power Diesel is designed for modern compression-ignition diesel engines, to facilitate enhanced engine performance along with increased engine protection, for more consistent operation and engine longevity.

The fuel is slightly less dense than regular diesel so, per volume, the unit energy is actually lower than regular diesel. This is offset, as the fuel tends to ignite more readily (and thus has a higher cetane rating) than regular diesel, and a side benefit of this is that it tends to produce less soot during combustion.

Shell also markets a different "premium" diesel in Canada labeled V-Power, which they state "Is specially formulated for year-round Canadian weather conditions, with a cetane improver, a de-icer and a corrosion inhibitor.". This Canadian V-Power diesel is dispensed from a dedicated pump that injects a measured amount of NEMO 2061 additive into the diesel supply shared with the other diesel pumps at the service station., which would typically be reflected by an increase in cetane rating of 1-2 points, but unlike European V-Power diesel, it contains no GTL components beyond those that may already exist in the shared diesel supply.

Effective June 1, 2012, Pilipinas Shell launches the new premium diesel fuel grade, Shell V-Power Nitro+ Diesel (formerly Shell V-Power Diesel). On June 8, 2017, Shell V-Power Nitro+ Diesel was renamed back as Shell V-Power Diesel.

== Development in motorsports ==
Since 2004, Shell V-Power has been sponsoring Scuderia Ferrari that participates in Formula One. Shell V-Power also sponsored Audi Sport Team Joest factory team until 2009. Since 2016 Shell V-Power has been sponsoring Dick Johnson Racing in the Supercars Championship.

Part of the campaign, especially targeted to sell "V-Power Nitro+" brand of the fuels (higher priced than usual and similar to blend used on the track) is organizing Formula One events in cities without a track. For example, on the streets of Warsaw, Poland, where Scuderia Ferrari driver Felipe Massa drove the race car used in 2013 Formula One Championship.

== In popular culture ==
All Shell V-Power fuels are featured in Need for Speed: The Run.
