= Paul Aron =

Estonian racing driver (born 2004)

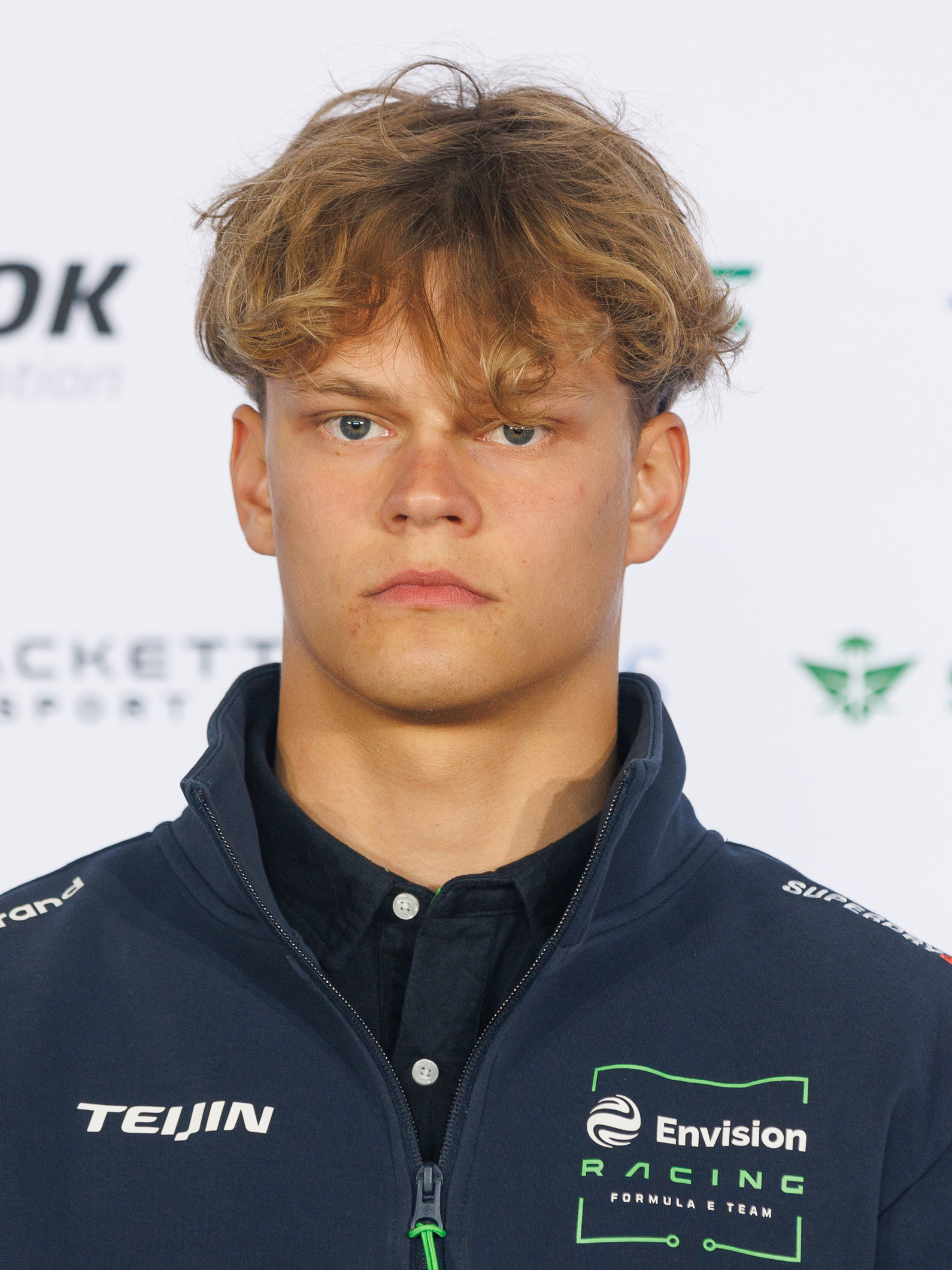
- Aron at the 2024 Berlin ePrix
- Nationality: (Estonia) Estonian
- Born: 4 February 2004 (age 22) Tallinn, Harju, Estonia
- Relatives: Ralf Aron (brother)

FIA Formula 2 Championship career
- Debut season: 2023
- Car number: 17
- Former teams: Trident, Hitech
- Starts: 30
- Championships: 0
- Wins: 1
- Podiums: 8
- Poles: 4
- Fastest laps: 2
- Best finish: 3rd in 2024

Previous series
- 2023–2024; 2023; 2022; 2021–2022; 2020; 2019; 2019: FIA Formula 2; FIA Formula 3; FR Asian; FR European; Formula Renault Eurocup; ADAC F4; Italian F4

Paul Aron (Estonian pronunciation: [ˈpɑu̯l ˈɑ.ron]; born 4 February 2004) is an Estonian racing driver. Aron most recently competed in the 2024 FIA Formula 2 Championship for Hitech.

Born and raised in Tallinn, Aron is the younger brother of sportscar racing driver Ralf Aron. After a successful karting career—culminating in his victory at the junior European Championship in 2018—Aron graduated to junior formulae. Debuting in Italian and ADAC F4 with Prema, he finished third in the former as the highest-placed rookie. He moved to the Formula Renault Eurocup in 2020, which then merged with Formula Regional European. He claimed third in 2021 and 2022 with Prema before progressing to FIA Formula 3, where he finished third again in his rookie season. Having debuted at Yas Island in 2023, Aron graduated to FIA Formula 2 for 2024, finishing third to Gabriel Bortoleto and Isack Hadjar following his maiden victory in Lusail with Hitech.

A member of the Mercedes Junior Team from 2019 to 2023, Aron joined Alpine as a reserve driver for 2025 and 2026. He made his free practice debut in Formula One at the 2025 British Grand Prix. Aron made his Formula E debut with Envision at the 2024 Berlin ePrix.

== Career ==
=== Karting ===
Starting in Estonia at the age of eight, Aron climbed the karting ladder as he was soon racing all over Europe but mostly in Italy. Aron won the CIK-FIA Karting European Championship in 2018.

=== Lower formulae ===
Aron made his single-seater debut in the 2019 ADAC Formula 4 Championship, racing for Prema Powerteam. Aron did not wait long to take his first win, taking his first in Austria. Two rounds later, he would win again in Netherlands, both of aforementioned wins would be his only podiums. He continued to score consistently and ended seventh in the standings.

Aron's more successful campaign in 2019 came in the Italian F4 Championship, also racing for Prema. He again took his first win at the Austria, the fourth round of the season. His other win was achieved at the penultimate round in Mugello. Having scored six other podiums, Aron finished the year in third behind Red Bull junior driver Dennis Hauger and Brazilian FDA-member Gianluca Petecof. Thanks to nine rookie victories, Aron became the rookie champion.

=== Formula Renault Eurocup ===
After testing with them in the post-season test at Paul Ricard in November 2019, Aron was signed to ART Grand Prix's new Formula Renault Eurocup outfit for the 2020 season. Aron had a difficult campaign, his high point of the season being his only podium, a second place at the Nürburgring. He was outscored by his more experienced teammates Grégoire Saucy and eventual champion Victor Martins and finished eleventh in the standings.

=== Formula Regional European Championship ===
==== 2021 ====
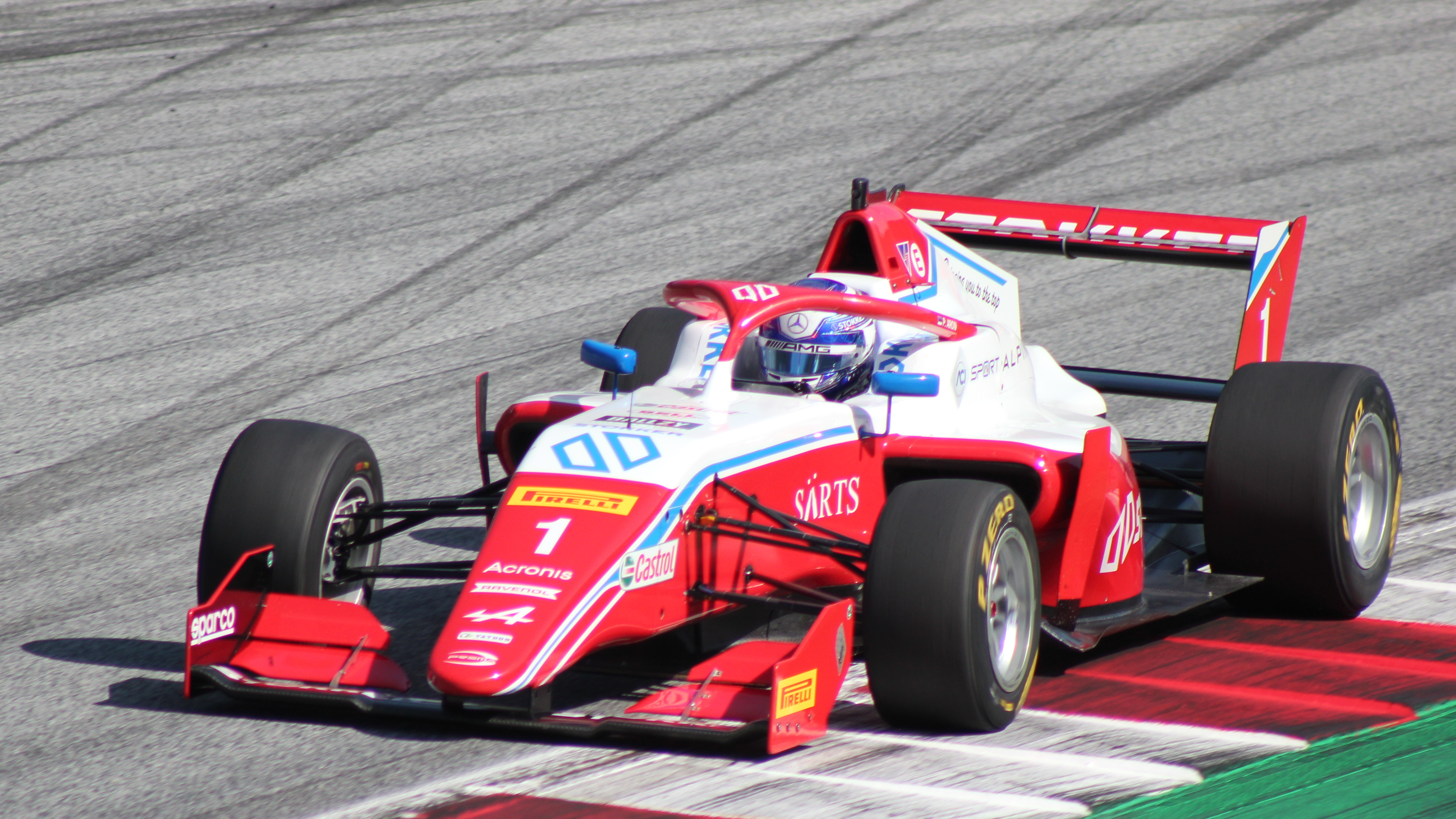
Aron in the 2021 Formula Regional European Championship at the Red Bull Ring.

In 2021, Aron moved back to Prema to partner David Vidales and Dino Beganovic in the Formula Regional European Championship. The Estonian's first podium came at the opening round at Imola, where he finished second in race 2, being beaten only by previous year's teammate Grégoire Saucy. Aron was able to finish third at the following two rounds respectively, but would then go on a podium drought that lasted until the seventh round of the season, which included a non-points scoring round at Circuit Paul Ricard. He would end that streak by finishing third during the first race at the Red Bull Ring. After a round in which he finished fourth and twelfth in Valencia, Aron claimed his first pole position of the season at the Mugello Circuit. He would then swoop by to take his first win in the series. The next day was just as superior for him, again taking pole and ending a complete sweep with a win. He concluded his season in Monza with a second place. Aron finished the year third overall with 197 points, two wins and seven total podiums behind Saucy and Hadrien David.

==== 2022 ====
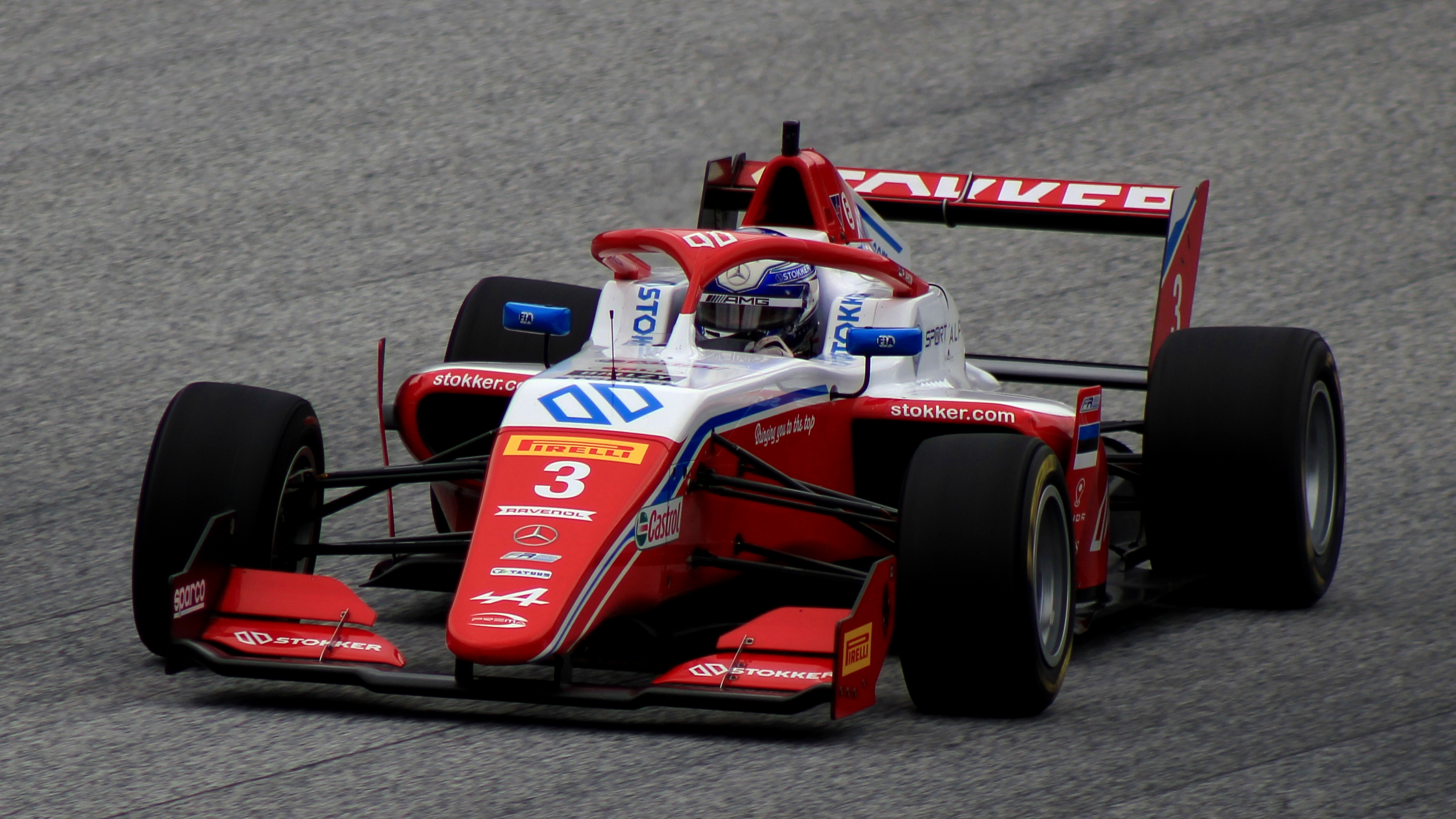
Aron racing in the 2022 Formula Regional European Championship at the Red Bull Ring.

During pre-season in 2022, Aron joined Abu Dhabi Racing by Prema for the Asian Championship. Aron did not win a race during that championship, but did manage to take a double pole during the third Dubai round. Claiming three podiums, he was classified ninth in the standings.

Aron continued with Prema for the 2022 Formula Regional European Championship. He got off to a great start, winning pole and the second race during the Monza opening round. After a third place in Imola, he had a terrible weekend in Monaco as a crash in qualifying hampered a chance of points. He would bounce back with a win at Paul Ricard, before completing a complete sweep in the next round at Zandvoort. However, Aron would go podium-less throughout the next three rounds, despite taking two pole positions at Spa-Francorchamps and the Red Bull Ring. A win followed in Circuit de Barcelona-Catalunya which was followed by another podium in the second race. The final round in Mugello witnessed Aron notch up yet another victory in the first race, but his title challenge ended as teammate Dino Beganovic was crowned champion. However, a poor second race meant that he failed to score, and race winner Gabriele Minì pipped Aron to second in the standings by four points. This meant Aron again finished third in the standings but he scored more points that the year before (238), had the most wins of anyone that season, (6), and the most poles (7).

=== FIA Formula 3 Championship ===
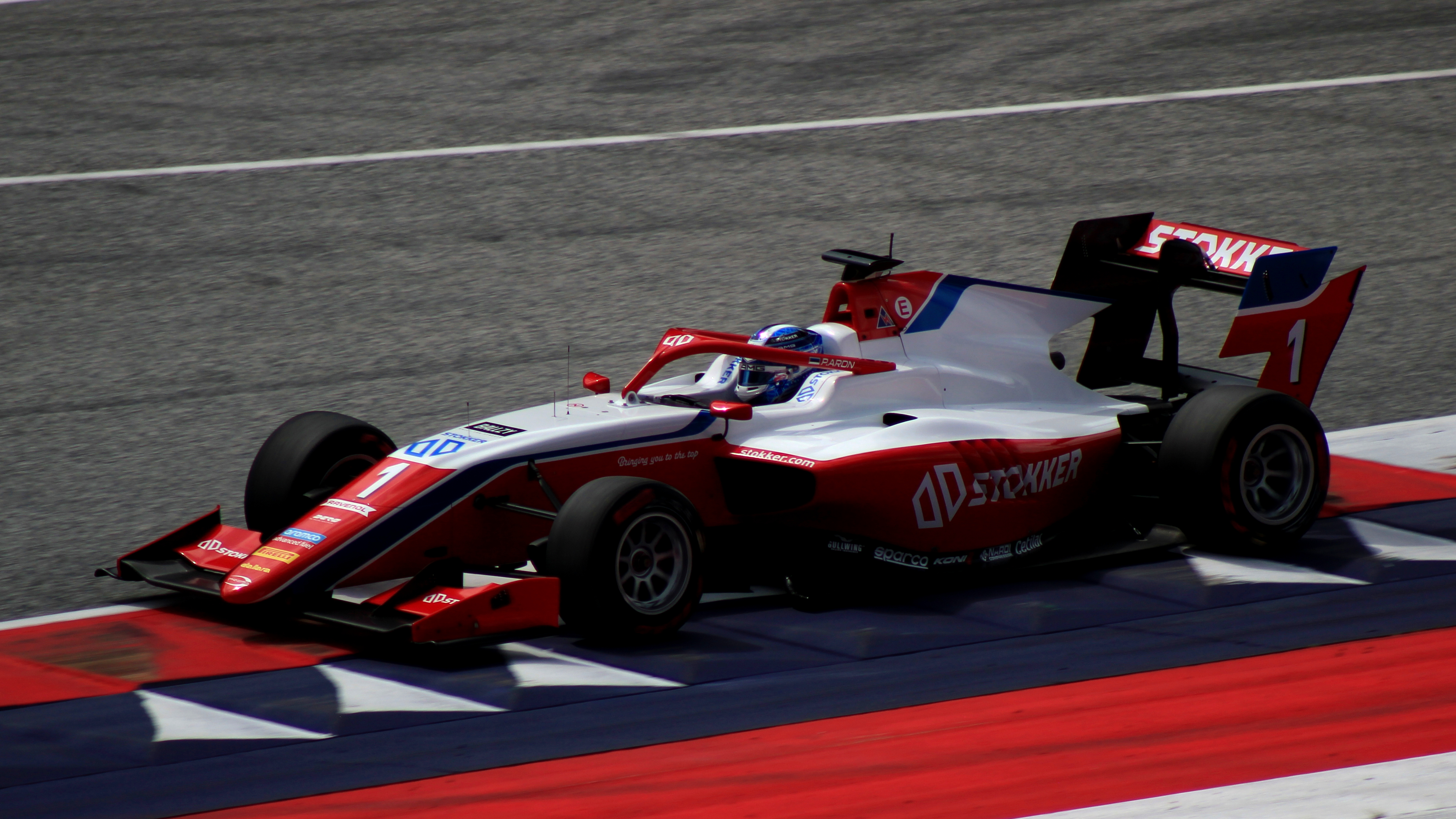
Aron driving the Dallara F3 2019 during the 2023 Spielberg Formula 3 round

In November 2021, Aron partook in the post-season test with Prema Racing on Day 2 and Day 3.

At the end of September 2022, Aron again took part in the FIA Formula 3 post-season test with Prema, contesting on all three days. During the following month, the team confirmed that Aron had signed up to compete in the 2023 F3 season, partnering FREC rival Dino Beganovic and GB3 champion Zak O'Sullivan.

Aron had a solid debut in Bahrain, finishing fifth in his first outing, but in the feature race, ended outside the points after a penalty for forcing teammate O'Sullivan wide. Aron qualified in sixth and finished in fourth for the sprint race. However, race winner Franco Colapinto was disqualified, promoting Aron to his first podium. He finished sixth in the feature race. He qualified third in Monaco. He then held off Gabriele Minì to take the final points-paying position in the sprint race. He capped the weekend by maintaining his third place in the feature race. He continued his consistent qualifying form in Barcelona, securing fifth. He would finish both races in the same position.

In Austria, Aron produced a lap that took him to pole, but due to exceeding track limits, was demoted to fourth. In the sprint race, he would redeem himself, jumping all the way to second from eighth by lap 8. A safety car helped to close the gap to race leader Pepe Martí, and Aron overhauled him for his first and only win of the season. The feature race provided contrasting fortunes, as he would clip his front wing in a battle for the lead with Grégoire Saucy and Aron had to pit for repairs. At Silverstone, Aron scored good points with fourth in the feature race. In Budapest, Aron persisted his qualifying form, doing so in sixth, despite labelling it as "difficult". Despite that, he would finish both races in fourth and fifth, again continuing his consistent form.

Aron had his worst qualifying session in Spa-Francorchamps in 11th. After a slow start from second in the sprint race which dropped him to fourth, he later overcame Hugh Barter for third, which was where he would finish. In the feature race, Aron was one of the minority who started on wet tyres. It proved to be the right gamble, hitting the front at the end of the first sector on the first lap. After Oliver Goethe crashed, Aron opted to pit under the safety car on a drying track for dry tyres. This resulted him in throwing away a potential victory, as the track had not dried enough yet. He eventually was left to rue his choice, finishing in eighth place. Aron qualified third for the Monza season finale. His failure to secure pole position handed Gabriel Bortoleto, the F3 title as Aron was now 38 points behind the Brazilian with 37 left on offer. His sprint race was over within seconds, as Caio Collet hit him, causing Aron to suffer a rear puncture and lose control, slamming into Jonny Edgar and Martí. Aron had a messy race, being involved in many battles that saw him slip to seventh. Aron finished third in the standings with 112 points, achieving one win and four podiums, and helping Prema to clinch the teams' title.

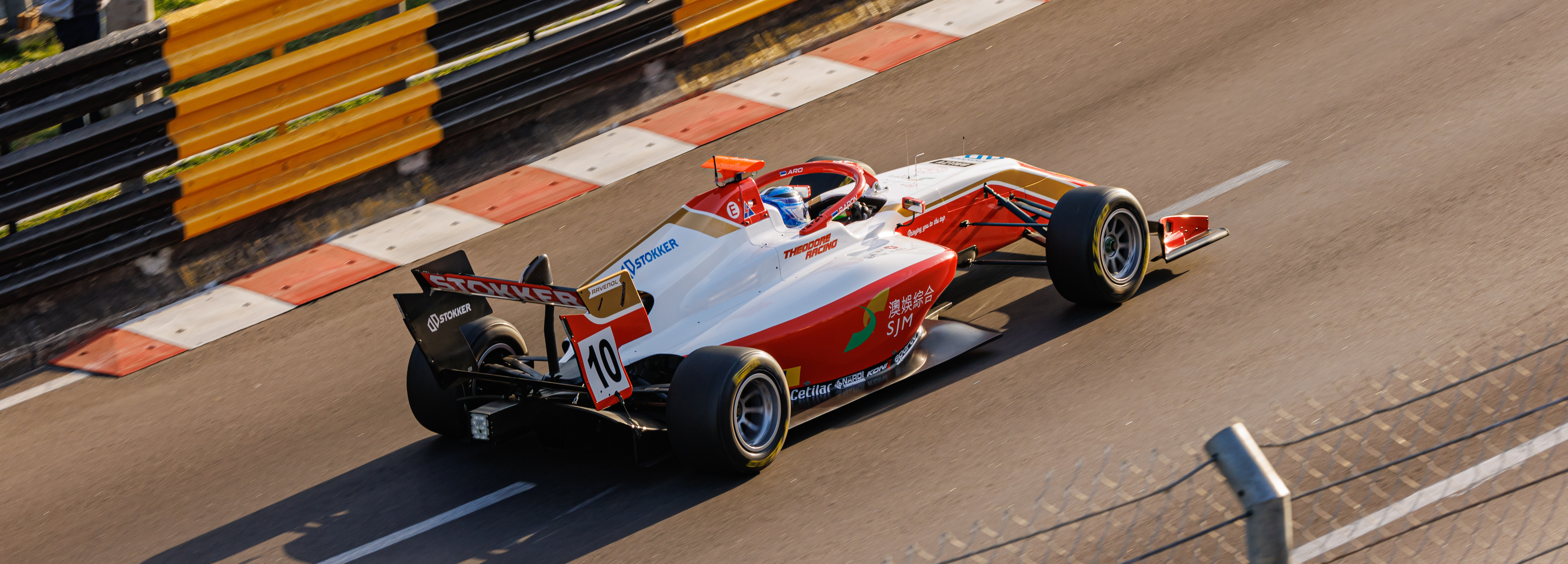
Aron racing at the 2023 Macau Grand Prix with Prema Racing

Aron took part in the 2023 Macau Grand Prix with SJM Theodore Prema Racing. His Macau debut would not go as planned, suffering a massive crash in the main race which tore his car in half.

=== FIA Formula 2 Championship ===
==== 2023 ====
Prior to the final round in Yas Marina for the 2023 FIA Formula 2 Championship, Trident announced they had signed Aron to replace Clément Novalak. Aron qualified 21st for his F2 debut. He finished the sprint in 16th and the feature race in 18th.

In November 2023, Aron partook in the post-season test with Hitech Pulse-Eight.

==== 2024 ====
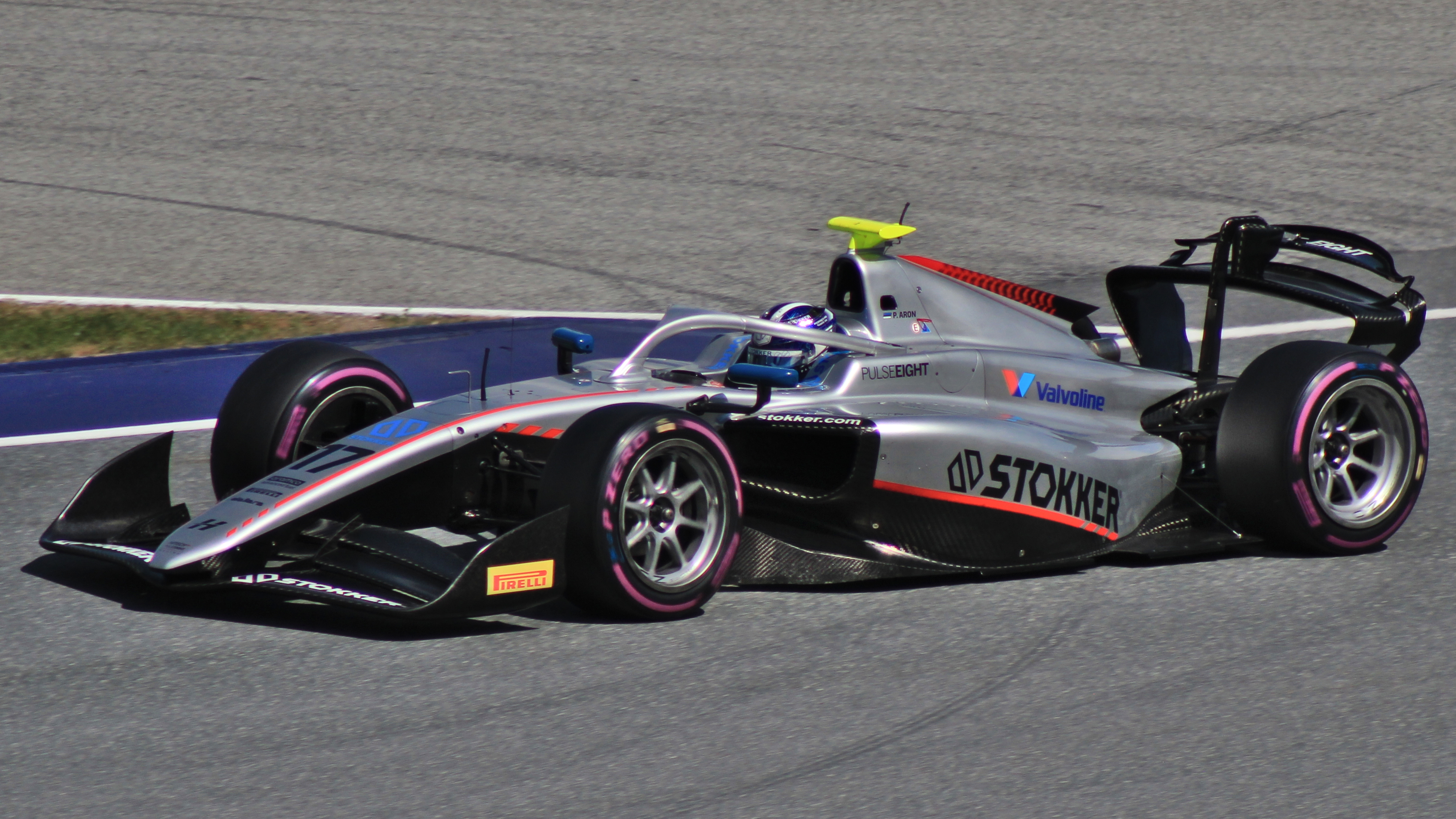
Aron driving the Dallara F2 2024 during the 2024 Spielberg Formula 2 round

In November 2023, Aron was announced to step up to Formula 2 with Hitech Pulse-Eight for the 2024 season alongside Amaury Cordeel. Qualifying 12th for the Bahrain opener, he made a charge in the sprint race to fifth place, barely holding off former F3 rival Gabriel Bortoleto. The feature race saw Aron making another comeback to finish third despite a penalty for speeding in the pitlane, therefore taking his first F2 podium. Qualifying on reverse pole in Jeddah, Aron led the sprint early on but dropped to third at the flag after losing out to Richard Verschoor and Dennis Hauger. However, race winner Verschoor was later disqualified, promoting Aron to second. He finished the feature race in tenth after a collision with Victor Martins towards the end. A first non-score during the Melbourne sprint race as he was caught up in an incident with Verschoor and finished down in 18th. Despite that, Aron moved up the field to finish in second place, securing his third podium in as many rounds.

In Imola, Aron avoided the carnage at the start of the sprint to take the lead but was passed by Franco Colapinto on the last lap, missing out on a first win. He finished sixth in a solid feature race, closing the gap to points leader Zane Maloney to five points. Qualifying fourth for Monaco, he finished the sprint race in seventh. His podium streak continued with third in the feature race, allowing Aron to take the championship lead. Aron secured his first F2 pole in Barcelona. Initially finishing fourth in the sprint, Juan Manuel Correa ahead was penalised for track limits, and Aron was promoted to end on the podium once again. In the feature race, Aron was jumped in the pits by Jak Crawford, and later slid into the gravel at the final corner. He eventually recovered to fourth place, maintaining his points lead.

Qualifying fifth for Austria, Aron sprinted to third place in the sprint race, keeping his podium streak alive. He maintained his lead with fifth place in the feature race despite a five-second penalty for excessively weaving. However, a disappointing weekend followed Silverstone where he only qualified 12th. In the sprint Aron would retire after being hit by Pepe Martí when his engine cut out on lap 7. The feature race was not better as Aron would get a penalty for colliding with Joshua Dürksen on lap 2 leading to a 12th-place finish, and therefore dropped to second in the standings. Aron bounced back by taking pole for the next round in Hungary. Returning to the points in the sprint race in sixth, his feature did not bode well as he lost places at the start following a lock-up. He then made crashed into with Zane Maloney on lap 7, causing both drivers to retire. Back-to-back poles followed in Belgium. In the feature race, Aron fought for the lead and later dropped to third place as title rivals Isack Hadjar and Gabriel Bortoleto passed him. Unfortunately for Aron, his engine would fail on the last lap, dropping him out of the points and losing second in the standings to Bortoleto.

He qualified third for Monza, continuing his good qualifying form, but ended the sprint in 20th after contact with Maloney late in the race, and Aron was given a ten-second penalty. However, his feature race retirements continued as he was taken out by Martí on the opening lap, which dropped Aron out of the top-three in the standings. In Baku, Aron qualified 12th, and avoided chaos in the sprint race to finish sixth. He replicated that result in the feature race, meaning that Aron sat fourth in the standings heading into the final two rounds. Qatar saw Aron qualifying on pole for the fourth time, and a charge in the sprint race saw him finish fifth, however a penalty for a collision with Victor Martins dropped him to seventh. In the feature race, he lost the lead to Bortoleto at the start, but after the Brazilian received a five-second penalty ahead, Aron remained within striking distance and eventually inherited first place, scoring his first win in Formula 2. Having an outside chance to win the title, Aron qualified third for the Yas Marina season finale. A fine drive in the sprint race secured him with third place in the end, but was disqualified due to an illegal modification to the DRS actuator. Additionally, he was made to start from the pit lane in the feature race, in which he finished 11th.

Aron finished his season third in the standings with one win, four poles, eight podiums and 163 points.

=== Formula One ===
In July 2019, Mercedes announced that Aron had joined their Junior Team; he left the programme in November 2023. Aron debuted in Formula One machinery with Alpine at the 2024 post-season test, driving the A524 at Yas Marina, completing a total of 121 laps, and setting the ninth fastest lap overall. In November 2024, Alpine signed Aron as a reserve driver for the 2025 season.

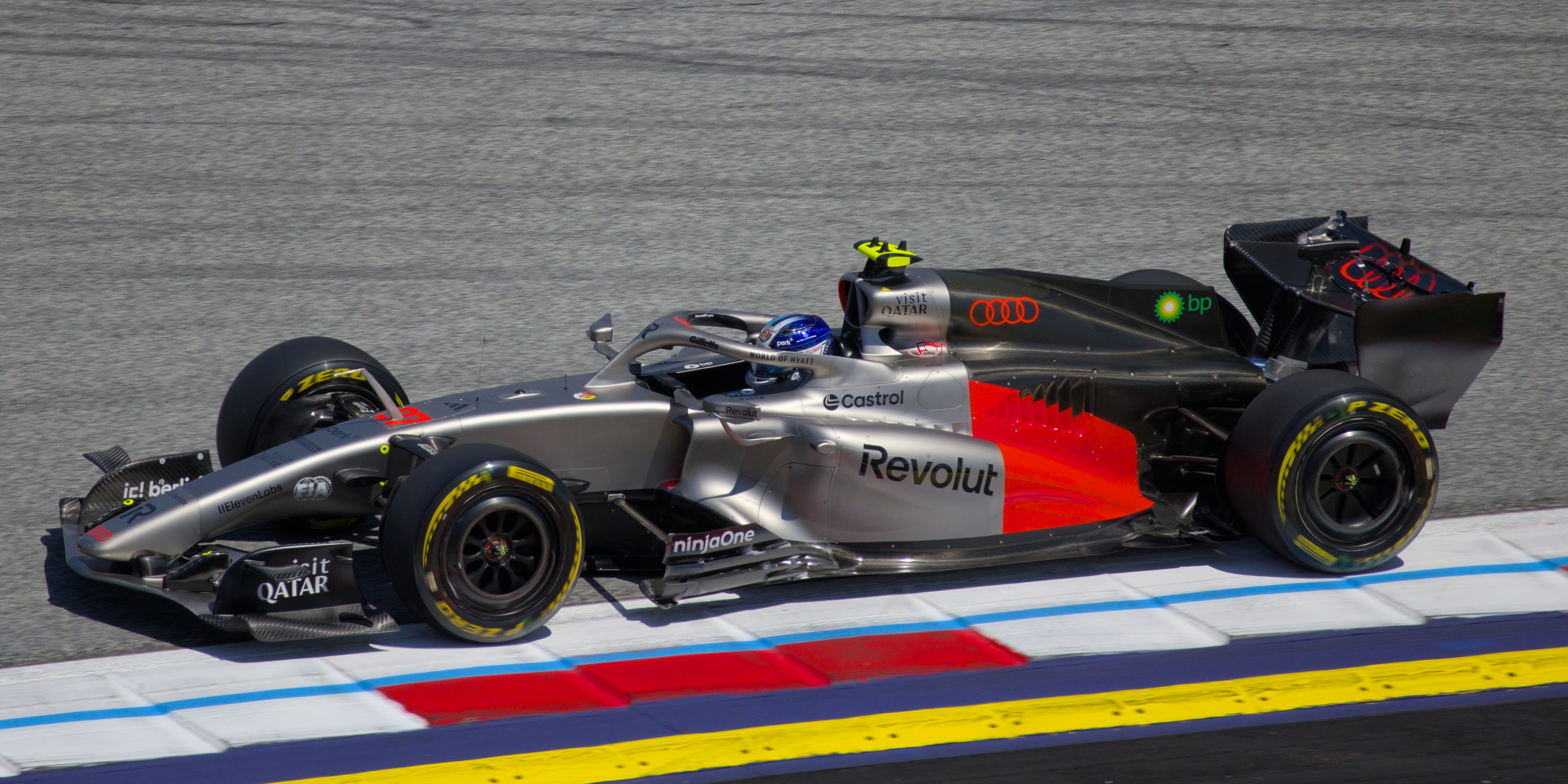
Aron testing the Audi R26 during the FP1 of the 2026 Austrian Grand Prix

Aron made his free practice debut with Sauber at the British Grand Prix in 2025—driving Nico Hülkenberg's C45—which he repeated at Hungary. He made another practice session appearance at the Italian Grand Prix, this time with Alpine, and made further appearances at the Mexico City and Abu Dhabi Grand Prix. At the end of the latter race, he partook in the young drivers' test at the Yas Marina Circuit with Sauber, setting the second fastest time whilst completing 126 laps.

Aron continued his role as Alpine reserve driver for the 2026 season. He was loaned to Audi for free practice sessions at the Barcelona-Catalunya and 2026 Austrian Grands Prix, finishing an impressive sixth in the former, before returning to Alpine for further outings at the Hungarian and Italian Grand Prix. In November, Aron was released as the Alpine reserve driver for Aron to pursue other motorsport opportunities following his pre-season test with Fortescue Zero Racing for Formula E.

=== Formula E ===
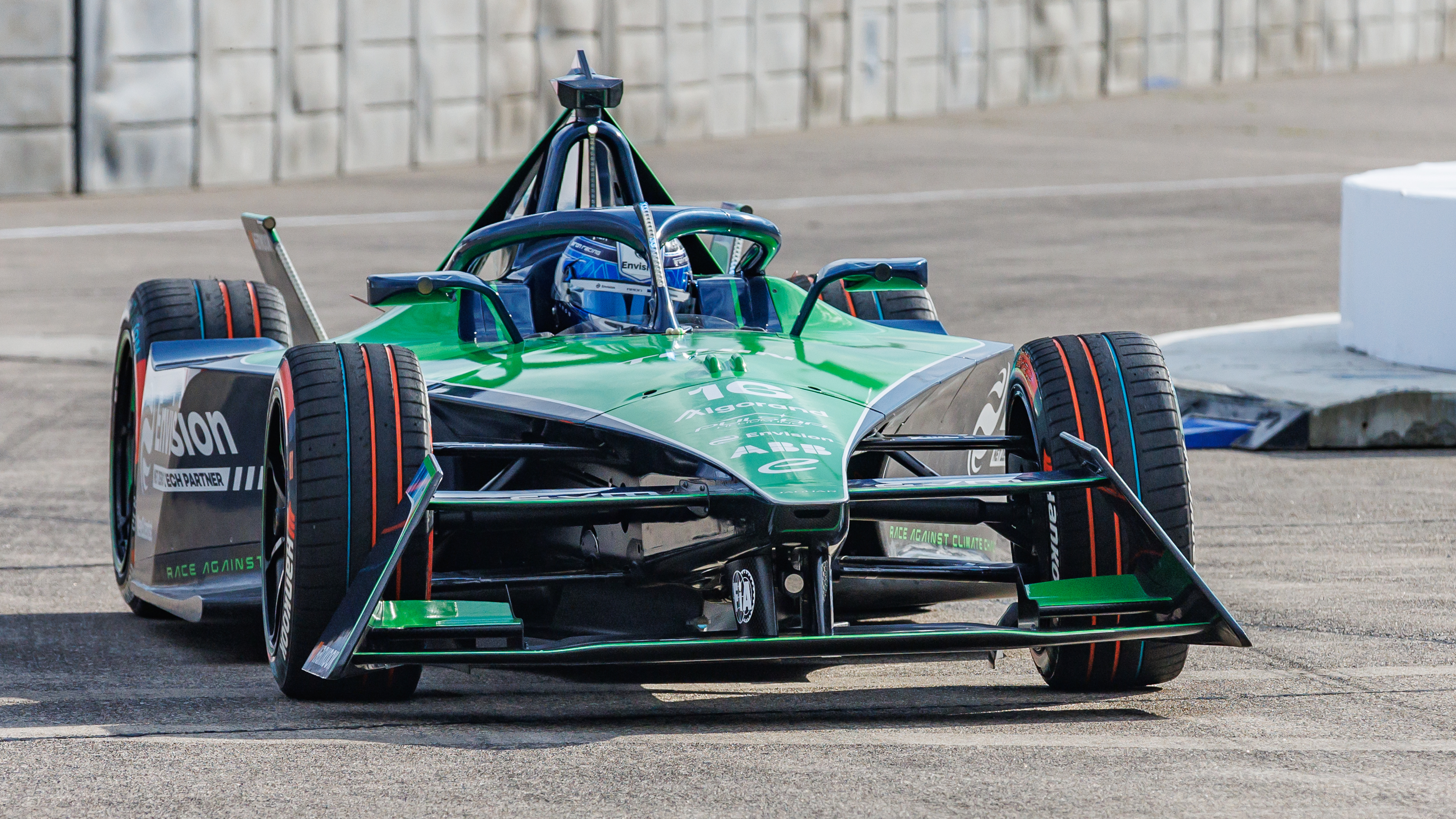
Aron driving for the Envision Racing at the 2024 Berlin ePrix

Aron made his Formula E debut at the 2024 Berlin ePrix for Envision Racing subbing in for Sébastien Buemi who was racing at the 6 Hours of Spa for Toyota Gazoo Racing. He finished both races in 13th and 14th respectively. At the 2026–27 pre-season testing at Circuito del Jarama, Aron tested for Fortescue Zero Racing after a contract dispute between the team and Taylor Barnard.

== Personal life ==
Aron's older brother is 2015 Italian F4 champion Ralf Aron, who currently is a team manager at Prema Powerteam.

== Karting record ==
=== Karting career summary ===
Season	Series	Team	Position
2012	Estonian Championship — Cadet	AIX Racing Team	6th
2015	WSK Gold Cup — 60 Mini		24th
2015	WSK Super Master Series — 60 Mini	Baby Race Srl	37th
2015	WSK Final Cup — 60 Mini	Baby Race Srl	14th
2016	WSK Champions Cup — 60 Mini	Baby Race Srl	9th
2016	WSK Super Master Series — 60 Mini	Baby Race Srl	13th
2016	WSK Final Cup— 60 Mini	Baby Race Srl	31st
2017	WSK Champions Cup — OKJ	Baby Race Srl	NC
2017	South Garda Winter Cup — OKJ	Baby Race Srl	34th
2017	WSK Super Master Series — OKJ	Baby Race Srl	22nd
2017	CIK-FIA European Championship — OKJ	Baby Race Srl	32nd
2017	CIK-FIA World Championship — OKJ	Ricky Flynn Motorsport	63rd
2017	WSK Final Cup — OKJ	Baby Race Srl	33rd
2018	WSK Champions Cup — OKJ	Ricky Flynn Motorsport	**1st**
2018	South Garda Winter Cup — OKJ	Ricky Flynn Motorsport	**1st**
2018	WSK Super Master Series — OKJ	Ricky Flynn Motorsport	**3rd**
2018	German Karting Championship — Junior	Ricky Flynn Motorsport	8th
2018	WSK Open Cup — OKJ	Ricky Flynn Motorsport	31st
2018	CIK-FIA European Championship — OKJ	Ricky Flynn Motorsport	**1st**
2018	CIK-FIA World Championship — OKJ	Ricky Flynn Motorsport	8th
2018	WSK Final Cup — OKJ	Ricky Flynn Motorsport	17th

=== Complete CIK-FIA Karting European Championship results ===
(key) (Races in bold indicate pole position) (Races in italics indicate fastest lap)

Year	Team	Class	1	2	3	4	5	6	7	8	9	10	DC	Points
2017	Baby Race Srl	OKJ	SAR; QH; 37	SAR; R DNQ	CAY; QH; 7	CAY; R 25	LEM; QH; 31	LEM; R 19	ALA; QH; 28	ALA; R NR	KRI; QH; 26	KRI; R 22	32nd	4
2018	Ricky Flynn Motorsport	OKJ	SAR; QH; 1	**SAR**; **R** 1	PFI; QH; 15	PFI; R (15)	AMP; QH; 3	AMP; R 1	AUB; QH; 7	AUB; R 5			1st	83

== Racing record ==
=== Racing career summary ===
Season	Series	Team	Races	Wins	Poles	F/Laps	Podiums	Points	Position
2019	Italian F4 Championship	Prema Powerteam	21	2	1	0	8	226	**3rd**
2019	ADAC Formula 4 Championship	Prema Powerteam	20	2	0	0	2	129	7th
2020	Formula Renault Eurocup	ART Grand Prix	20	0	0	0	1	54	11th
2021	Formula Regional European Championship	Prema Powerteam	20	2	2	1	7	197	**3rd**
2022	Formula Regional Asian Championship	Abu Dhabi Racing by Prema	15	0	2	1	3	80	8th
2022	Formula Regional European Championship	Prema Racing	20	6	7	4	8	241	**3rd**
2022	Aurum 1006 km – GT3	Circle K milesPLUS Racing Team	1	0	1	0	1	—N/a	**2nd**
2023	FIA Formula 3 Championship	Prema Racing	18	1	0	2	4	112	**3rd**
2023	Macau Grand Prix	SJM Theodore Prema Racing	1	0	0	0	0	—N/a	DNF
2023	FIA Formula 2 Championship	Trident	2	0	0	0	0	0	24th
2023–24	Formula E	Envision Racing	2	0	0	0	0	0	27th
2024	FIA Formula 2 Championship	Hitech Pulse-Eight	28	1	4	3	8	163	**3rd**
2025	Formula One	BWT Alpine F1 Team	Reserve driver						
2025	Formula One	Stake F1 Team Kick Sauber	Test driver						
2026	Formula One	BWT Alpine F1 Team	Reserve driver						
2026	Formula One	Audi Revolut F1 Team	Test driver						
2026–27	Formula E	Fortescue Zero Racing	Test driver						

=== Complete Italian F4 Championship results ===
(key) (Races in bold indicate pole position) (Races in italics indicate fastest lap)

Year	Team	1	2	3	4	5	6	7	8	9	10	11	12	13	14	15	16	17	18	19	20	21	22	Pos	Points
2019	Prema Powerteam	VLL; 1; 5	VLL; 2; 12	VLL; 3 Ret	MIS; 1; 4	**MIS**; **2** Ret	MIS; 3 C	HUN; 1; 3	HUN; 2; 3	HUN; 3; 26	RBR; 1; 1	RBR; 2; 23	RBR; 3; 3	IMO; 1; 4	IMO; 2; 6	IMO; 3; 4	IMO; 4; 2	MUG; 1; 1	MUG; 2; 4	MUG; 3; 2	MNZ; 1; 8	MNZ; 2; 3	MNZ; 3; 5	3rd	226

=== Complete ADAC Formula 4 Championship results ===
(key) (Races in bold indicate pole position) (Races in italics indicate fastest lap)

Year	Team	1	2	3	4	5	6	7	8	9	10	11	12	13	14	15	16	17	18	19	20	Pos	Points
2019	Prema Powerteam	OSC; 1; 6	OSC; 2; 4	OSC; 3; 7	RBR; 1; 23	RBR; 2; 6	RBR; 3; 1	HOC; 1; 16	HOC; 2 Ret	ZAN; 1; 15	ZAN; 2; 1	ZAN; 3 Ret	NÜR; 1; 7	NÜR; 2; 10	NÜR; 3; 6	HOC; 1; 4	HOC; 2; 9	HOC; 3 Ret	SAC; 1; 5	SAC; 2; 11	SAC; 3; 7	7th	129

=== Complete Formula Renault Eurocup results ===
(key) (Races in bold indicate pole position) (Races in italics indicate fastest lap)

Year	Team	1	2	3	4	5	6	7	8	9	10	11	12	13	14	15	16	17	18	19	20	DC	Points
2020	ART Grand Prix	MNZ; 1 Ret	MNZ; 2; 12	IMO; 1 Ret	IMO; 2; 6	NÜR; 1; 11	NÜR; 2; 2	MAG; 1; 10	MAG; 2; 12	ZAN; 1; 7	ZAN; 2; 17	CAT; 1; 8	CAT; 2; 12	SPA; 1 Ret	SPA; 2 DNS	IMO; 1 Ret	IMO; 2; 8	HOC; 1; 9	HOC; 2; 5	LEC; 1; 10	LEC; 2; 17	11th	54

=== Complete Formula Regional European Championship results ===
(key) (Races in bold indicate pole position) (Races in italics indicate fastest lap)

Year	Team	1	2	3	4	5	6	7	8	9	10	11	12	13	14	15	16	17	18	19	20	DC	Points
2021	Prema Powerteam	IMO; 1; 4	IMO; 2; 2	CAT; 1; 3	CAT; 2; 4	MCO; 1; 3	MCO; 2 Ret	LEC; 1; 14	LEC; 2; 26	ZAN; 1; 4	ZAN; 2; 7	SPA; 1; 18	SPA; 2; 8	RBR; 1; 3	RBR; 2; 13	VAL; 1; 4	VAL; 2; 12	**MUG**; **1**; 1	**MUG**; **2**; 1	MNZ; 1; 6	MNZ; 2; 2	3rd	197
2022	Prema Racing	MNZ; 1; 27	**MNZ**; **2**; 1	IMO; 1; 3	IMO; 2; 6	MCO; 1; 25	MCO; 2 DNQ	LEC; 1; 1	LEC; 2; 4	**ZAN**; **1**; 1	**ZAN**; **2**; 1	HUN; 1; 6	HUN; 2; 7	SPA; 1; 4	**SPA**; **2**; 4	**RBR**; **1** Ret	RBR; 2; 16	**CAT**; **1**; 1	CAT; 2; 4	**MUG**; **1**; 1	MUG; 2; 11	3rd	238

=== Complete Formula Regional Asian Championship results ===
(key) (Races in bold indicate pole position) (Races in italics indicate the fastest lap of top ten finishers)

Year	Entrant	1	2	3	4	5	6	7	8	9	10	11	12	13	14	15	DC	Points
2022	Abu Dhabi Racing by Prema	ABU; 1 Ret	ABU; 2; 15	ABU; 3; 7	DUB; 1; 15	DUB; 2; 10	DUB; 3; 23	DUB; 1; 6	DUB; 2; 14	DUB; 3 Ret	**DUB**; **1**; 2	DUB; 2; 8	**DUB**; **3**; 2	ABU; 1; 5	ABU; 2 Ret	ABU; 3; 3	8th	80

=== Complete FIA Formula 3 Championship results ===
(key) (Races in bold indicate pole position) (Races in italics indicate fastest lap)

Year	Entrant	1	2	3	4	5	6	7	8	9	10	11	12	13	14	15	16	17	18	DC	Points
2023	Prema Racing	BHR; SPR; 5	BHR; FEA; 12	MEL; SPR; 3	MEL; FEA; 6	MON; SPR; 10	MON; FEA; 3	CAT; SPR; 5	CAT; FEA; 5	RBR; SPR; 1	RBR; FEA; 25	SIL; SPR; 12	SIL; FEA; 4	HUN; SPR; 4	HUN; FEA; 5	SPA; SPR; 3	SPA; FEA; 8	MNZ; SPR; Ret	MNZ; FEA; 7	3rd	112

=== Complete Macau Grand Prix results ===
Year	Team	Car	Qualifying	Quali Race	Main race
2023	(Hong Kong) SJM Theodore Prema Racing	Dallara F3 2019	14th	7th	DNF

=== Complete FIA Formula 2 Championship results ===
(key) (Races in bold indicate pole position) (Races in italics indicate points for the fastest lap of top ten finishers)

Year	Entrant	1	2	3	4	5	6	7	8	9	10	11	12	13	14	15	16	17	18	19	20	21	22	23	24	25	26	27	28	DC	Points
2023	Trident	BHR; SPR	BHR; FEA	JED; SPR	JED; FEA	MEL; SPR	MEL; FEA	BAK; SPR	BAK; FEA	MCO; SPR	MCO; FEA	CAT; SPR	CAT; FEA	RBR; SPR	RBR; FEA	SIL; SPR	SIL; FEA	HUN; SPR	HUN; FEA	SPA; SPR	SPA; FEA	ZAN; SPR	ZAN; FEA	MNZ; SPR	MNZ; FEA	YMC; SPR; 16	YMC; FEA; 18			24th	0
2024	Hitech Pulse-Eight	BHR; SPR; 5	BHR; FEA; 3	JED; SPR; 2	JED; FEA; 10	MEL; SPR; 18	MEL; FEA; 2	IMO; SPR; 2	IMO; FEA; 6	MON; SPR; 7	MON; FEA; 3	CAT; SPR; 3	**CAT**; **FEA**; 4	RBR; SPR; 3	RBR; FEA; 5	SIL; SPR; Ret	SIL; FEA; 12	HUN; SPR; 6	**HUN**; **FEA**; Ret	SPA; SPR; 18	**SPA**; **FEA**; 16†	MNZ; SPR; 20	MNZ; FEA; Ret	BAK; SPR; 6	BAK; FEA; 6	LSL; SPR; 7	**LSL**; **FEA**; 1	YMC; SPR; DSQ	YMC; FEA; 11	3rd	163

=== Complete Formula E results ===
(key) (Races in bold indicate pole position; races in italics indicate fastest lap)

Year	Team	Chassis	Powertrain	1	2	3	4	5	6	7	8	9	10	11	12	13	14	15	16	Pos	Points
2023–24	Envision Racing	Formula E Gen3	Jaguar I-Type 6	MEX	DRH	DRH	SAP	TOK	MIS	MIS	MCO	BER; 13	BER; 14	SIC	SIC	POR	POR	LDN	LDN	27th	0

=== Complete Formula One participations ===
(key) (Races in bold indicate pole position; races in italics indicate fastest lap)

Year	Entrant	Chassis	Engine	1	2	3	4	5	6	7	8	9	10	11	12	13	14	15	16	17	18	19	20	21	22	23	24	WDC	Points
2025	Stake F1 Team Kick Sauber	Kick Sauber C45	Ferrari 066/12 1.6 V6 t	AUS	CHN	JPN	BHR	SAU	MIA	EMI	MON	ESP	CAN	AUT	GBR; TD	BEL	HUN; TD	NED										–	–
2025	BWT Alpine F1 Team	Alpine A525	Renault E-Tech RE25 1.6 V6 t																ITA; TD	AZE	SIN	USA	MXC; TD	SAP	LVG	QAT	ABU; TD	–	–
2026	Audi Revolut F1 Team	Audi R26	AFR 26 Hybrid 1.6 V6 t	AUS	CHN	JPN	MIA	CAN	MON	BCN; TD	AUT; TD	GBR	BEL															–	–
2026	BWT Alpine F1 Team	Alpine A526	Mercedes-AMG F1 M17 1.6 V6 t											HUN; TD	NED	ITA; TD	ESP	AZE	BHR	SIN	USA	MXC	SAP	LVG	QAT	ABU		–	–
