= Audi R26 =

2026 Formula One car

- Nico Hülkenberg driving the Audi R26 at the 2026 Austrian Grand Prix
- Category: Formula One
- Designers: Mattia Binotto (Head of F1 Project); James Key (Technical Director); Stefano Sordo (Performance Director); Andrea Ferrarelli (Deputy Head of Vehicle Performance); Eric Gandelin (Chief Designer, Chassis); Stefano Sangiorgi (Chief Designer, Powertrain Integration); Iain Bomphray (Head of Research and Development); Alessandro Cinelli (Head of Aerodynamics); Tony Salter (Chief Aerodynamicist); Stefan Dreyer (Chief Technical Officer, Power Unit)
- Predecessor: Kick Sauber C45 (Sauber)

Technical specifications
- Chassis: Carbon fibre composite with survival cell and honeycomb structure
- Suspension (front): Double wishbone push-rod
- Suspension (rear): Double wishbone push-rod
- Length: 5,440 mm (214 in)
- Width: 1,900 mm (75 in)
- Height: 980 mm (39 in)
- Wheelbase: 3,400 mm (134 in)
- Engine: Audi AFR 26 Hybrid 1.6 L (98 cu in) direct injection V6 turbocharged engine in a rear mid-mounted, rear-wheel-drive layout
- Electric motor: Audi Kinetic Recovery System
- Transmission: In-house Audi 8-speed + 1 reverse titanium gearbox sequential seamless semi-automatic paddle shift. “Quickshift” system in operation to maximize speed of gearshifts with limited-slip differential
- Battery: Audi lithium-ion battery
- Weight: 770 kg (1,698 lb)
- Fuel: BP Ultimate Sustainable 437B
- Lubricants: Castrol
- Brakes: Brembo carbon discs with steel calipers and pads
- Tyres: Pirelli P Zero (Dry); Pirelli Cinturato (Wet)
- Clutch: ZF electro-hydraulically operated, carbon multi-plate

Competition history
- Notable entrants: Audi Revolut F1 Team
- Notable drivers: 5. (Brazil) Gabriel Bortoleto; 27. (Germany) Nico Hülkenberg
- Debut: 2026 Australian Grand Prix
- Last event: 2026 Singapore Grand Prix
Races	Wins	Podiums	Poles	F/Laps
17	0	0	0	0

The Audi R26 is a Formula One car designed and built by Audi to compete in the 2026 Formula One World Championship. It is currently being driven by Nico Hülkenberg and Gabriel Bortoleto, both in their second season with the Hinwil-based team.

The R26 is the first Formula One car built by Audi after its takeover of Sauber and the first Hinwil-built car to utilize non-Ferrari engines since the BMW-powered BMW Sauber F1.09 in the 2009 season. It is also the first Hinwil-built Formula One car to utilise Castrol-branded lubricant since the Ford Cosworth-powered Sauber C14 in the 1995 season and also the first Formula One car to carry the BP and Castrol logos brands since the Renault-powered Alpine A524 in 2024.

== Background ==
=== Development context ===
Significant changes to the technical regulations were introduced for 2026, affecting both the chassis and engine.

=== Launch and pre-season testing ===
On 19 December 2025, Audi completed its inaugural fire-up of the car at the team's Hinwil site in Switzerland. The first shakedown of the R26 took place on 9 January 2026 at the Circuit de Barcelona-Catalunya and the car was officially launched on 20 January 2026 at the Kraftwerk in Berlin.

== Complete Formula One results ==
Key

Key
Colour	Result
Gold	Winner
Silver	Second place
Bronze	Third place
Green	Other points position
Blue	Other classified position
Blue	Not classified, finished (NC)
Purple	Not classified, retired (Ret)
Red	Did not qualify (DNQ)
Black	Disqualified (DSQ)
White	Did not start (DNS)
White	Race cancelled (C)
Blank	Did not practice (DNP)
Blank	Excluded (EX)
Blank	Did not arrive (DNA)
Blank	Withdrawn (WD)
Blank	Did not enter (empty cell)
Annotation	Meaning
P	Pole position
F	Fastest lap
Superscript number	Points-scoring position in sprint

Year	Entrant	Power unit	Tyres	Driver name	Grands Prix																							Points	WCC pos.
Year	Entrant	Power unit	Tyres	Driver name	AUS	CHN	JPN	MIA	CAN	MON	BCN	AUT	GBR	BEL	HUN	NED	ITA	ESP	AZE	BHR	SIN	USA	MXC	SAP	LVG	QAT	ABU	Points	WCC pos.
2026	Audi Revolut F1 Team	Audi AFR 26 Hybrid	P	(Brazil) Gabriel Bortoleto	9	DNS	13	12	13	11	11	11	8	8	11	13	11	13	15	18	Ret							23*	8th*
2026	Audi Revolut F1 Team	Audi AFR 26 Hybrid	P	(Germany) Nico Hülkenberg	DNS	11	11	Ret	12	13	Ret	12	Ret	13	9	8	12	10	11	11	8^{7}							23*	8th*

* Season still in progress.
