= Kick Sauber C45 =

2025 Formula One car

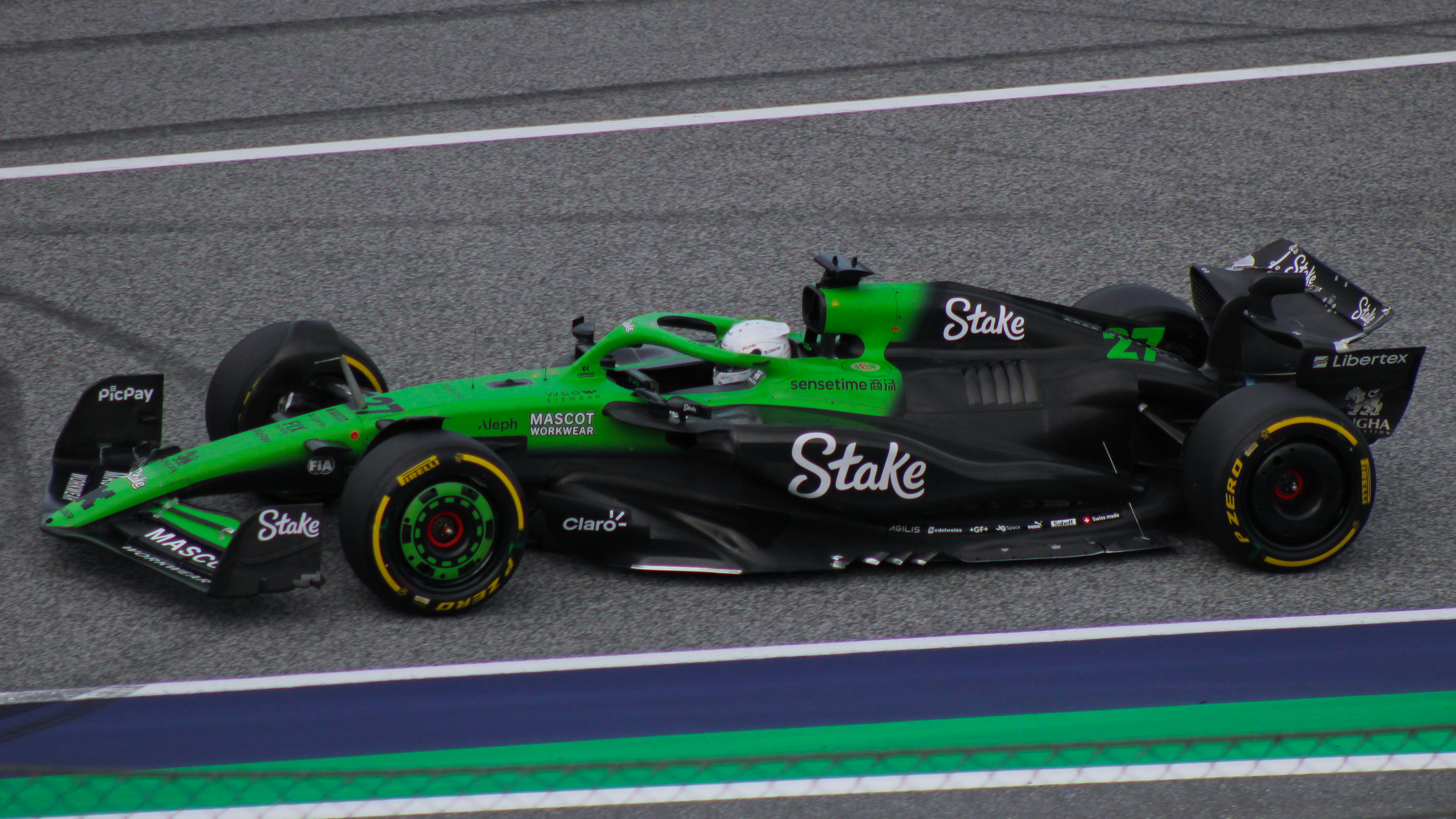
- Nico Hülkenberg driving the C45 during the Austrian Grand Prix
- Category: Formula One
- Constructor: Kick Sauber
- Designers: Mattia Binotto (Chief Technical Officer); James Key (Technical Director); Stefano Sordo (Performance Director); Eric Gandelin (Chief Designer); Alessandro Cinelli (Head of Aerodynamics); Tony Salter (Head of Aerodynamic Concept); Franck Sanchez (Chief Aerodynamicist)
- Predecessor: Kick Sauber C44
- Successor: Audi R26

Technical specifications
- Engine: Ferrari 066/12 1.6 L (98 cu in) direct injection V6 turbocharged engine limited to 15,000 RPM in a mid-mounted, rear-wheel drive layout 1.6 L (98 cu in) V6 (90°)
- Electric motor: Ferrari kinetic and thermal energy recovery systems
- Transmission: Sauber 8 forward + 1 reverse
- Weight: 800 kg (including driver, excluding fuel)
- Fuel: Shell V-Power (Note: Zero Petroleum branding appeared on the C45, but the car used Shell V-Power fuels.)
- Lubricants: Shell Helix Ultra (Note: Sunoco branding appeared on the C45, but the car used Shell Helix lubricants.)
- Tyres: Pirelli P Zero (Dry/Slick); Pirelli Cinturato (Wet/Treaded)

Competition history
- Notable entrants: Stake F1 Team Kick Sauber
- Notable drivers: 5. (Brazil) Gabriel Bortoleto; 27. (Germany) Nico Hülkenberg
- Debut: 2025 Australian Grand Prix
- Last event: 2025 Abu Dhabi Grand Prix
Races	Wins	Podiums	Poles	F/Laps
24	0	1	0	0

The Kick Sauber C45 is a Formula One car designed and constructed by Stake F1 Team Kick Sauber to compete in the 2025 Formula One World Championship. It was driven by Gabriel Bortoleto and Nico Hülkenberg in the team's final year before becoming the Audi factory team in 2026. Designed as an evolution of the Kick Sauber C44, a series of successive upgrades starting at the Spanish Grand Prix significantly increased the team's competitiveness. After scoring three consecutive points finishes, Hülkenberg achieved the team's first podium since 2012 at the 2025 British Grand Prix.

== Background ==
The car's livery was revealed at the F1 75 Live event on 18 February 2025, which was followed by a series of digital renderings released immediately after the event. The chassis was designed to build on a late-season aerodynamic and cooling package brought to the C44, but the car struggled with significant stiffness and airflow issues during pre-season testing. As a result, the team expedited an upgrade package intended for later in the season and arrived at the first round with a very different chassis than in testing.

== Competition and development history of the C45 ==
The C45 made its public debut at Bahrain International Circuit during official preseason testing. Prior to the car's debut, both drivers completed testing under the Testing Previous Cars (TPC) programme with the C44 at Yas Marina and the C42 at Circuit de Barcelona-Catalunya.

=== Debut and first points ===
On its race debut at the 2025 Australian Grand Prix, Bortoleto reached Q2 in qualifying and Hülkenberg finished in seventh position to score six points. As a result, the C45 achieved more points in its first race than its predecessor scored throughout the entire 2024 season. After Jonathan Wheatley joined as Team Principal for the Japanese Grand Prix, the team's pit stop times began to drop substantially. After recording the second and fourth-fastest stops in Bahrain, the team recorded the fastest pit stop in Miami with a time of 2.24 seconds. However, the team still failed to score points for seven consecutive races, which included a post-race plank wear disqualification for Hülkenberg after Bahrain.

=== Mid-season upgrade packages ===
Bortoleto took eighth during the Italian Grand Prix, while his teammate was unable to start the race.

Sauber brought a large upgrade package to the Spanish Grand Prix, which included substantial changes to the floor outer edge, the engine cover shape, and the front wing. Aimed at reducing the car's sensitivity to dirty air and crosswind, Hülkenberg drove from fifteenth on the grid to sixth after passing Lewis Hamilton's Ferrari in the closing laps. After post-race penalties were applied the team recorded a fifth place finish, its best result since the 2022 Emilia Romagna Grand Prix.

Hülkenberg finished in the points again with eighth in Canada, however Bortoleto still failed to score. This changed after a second upgrade package was introduced in Austria, where Bortoleto qualified eighth to deliver the team's first Q3 appearance since 2023. In the race, Bortoleto led the team's first double points finish since 2023, finishing in eighth and winning driver of the day.

A third upgrade package in four races was introduced in Great Britain, which included further changes to the C45's floor and the front wing. During a mixed-condition race with heavy rain, Hülkenberg held off Lewis Hamilton in the final stages to finish on the podium in third position. This result was his maiden podium after 239 Formula 1 starts, ending the longest historical streak of race starts without a podium finish. This was also the team's first podium in thirteen years, ending a drought dating back to the 2012 Japanese Grand Prix.

== Sponsorship and livery ==
The car's livery retains the green and black colors of cryptocurrency-based online casino Stake, whose two-year title sponsorship deal ends after the 2025 season. As during the previous season, the team's branding will change to Kick in jurisdictions where gambling sponsorship is outlawed.

In Miami, the team raced in an alternate livery with green paint splatters intended to represent the street art of the city. In Spain, the team raced in an alternate "pixelated" livery in deference to joint title sponsors Kick. For the Las Vegas event, the team announced a special commemorative livery dubbed "Last Lap" that celebrated the Swiss outfit's history in Formula 1.

== Complete Formula One results ==
Key

Key
Colour	Result
Gold	Winner
Silver	Second place
Bronze	Third place
Green	Other points position
Blue	Other classified position
Blue	Not classified, finished (NC)
Purple	Not classified, retired (Ret)
Red	Did not qualify (DNQ)
Black	Disqualified (DSQ)
White	Did not start (DNS)
White	Race cancelled (C)
Blank	Did not practice (DNP)
Blank	Excluded (EX)
Blank	Did not arrive (DNA)
Blank	Withdrawn (WD)
Blank	Did not enter (empty cell)
Annotation	Meaning
P	Pole position
F	Fastest lap
Superscript number	Points-scoring position in sprint

Year	Entrant	Power unit	Tyres	Driver name	Grands Prix																								Points	WCC pos.
Year	Entrant	Power unit	Tyres	Driver name	AUS	CHN	JPN	BHR	SAU	MIA	EMI	MON	ESP	CAN	AUT	GBR	BEL	HUN	NED	ITA	AZE	SIN	USA	MXC	SAP	LVG	QAT	ABU	Points	WCC pos.
2025	Stake F1 Team Kick Sauber	Ferrari 066/15 1.6 V6 t	P	(Brazil) Gabriel Bortoleto	Ret	14	19	18	18	Ret	18	14	12	14	8	Ret	9	6	15	8	11	17	18	10	Ret	Ret	13	11	70	9th
2025	Stake F1 Team Kick Sauber	Ferrari 066/15 1.6 V6 t	P	(Germany) Nico Hülkenberg	7	15	16	DSQ	15	14	12	16	5	8	9	3	12	13	14	DNS	16	20	8	Ret	9	7	Ret	9	70	9th
