= Kick Sauber C44 =

2024 Formula One car

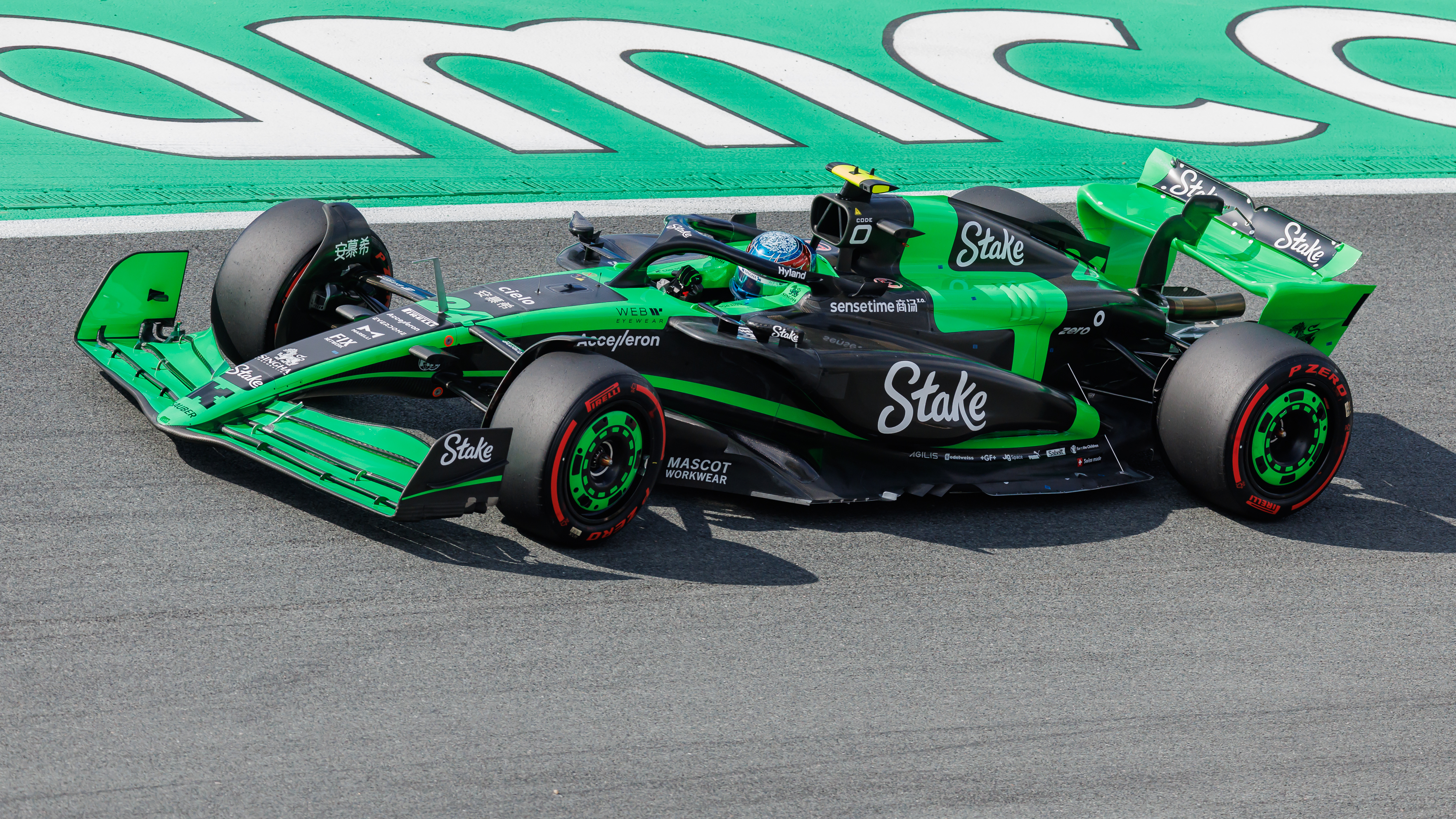
- Zhou Guanyu driving a C44 during the Dutch Grand Prix
- Category: Formula One
- Constructor: Kick Sauber
- Designers: James Key (Technical Director); Eric Gandelin (Chief Designer); Lucia Conconi (Head of Vehicle Performance); Alessandro Cinelli (Head of Aerodynamics); Tony Salter (Head of Aerodynamic Concept); Franck Sanchez (Chief Aerodynamicist)
- Predecessor: Alfa Romeo C43
- Successor: Kick Sauber C45

Technical specifications
- Suspension (front): Carbon fibre double wishbone, pullrod-activated inboard torsion springs, rockers and Öhlins damper units
- Suspension (rear): Carbon fibre double wishbone, pushrod-activated inboard torsion springs, rockers and Öhlins damper units
- Engine: Ferrari 066/12 1.6 L (98 cu in) direct injection V6 turbocharged engine limited to 15,000 rpm in a mid-mounted, rear-wheel drive layout 1.6 L (98 cu in) V6 (90°) turbocharged, 15,000 rpm limited
- Electric motor: Ferrari kinetic and thermal energy recovery systems
- Transmission: Sauber carbon case with Ferrari cassette, 8-speed + 1 reverse sequential seamless semi-automatic paddle shift
- Battery: Lithium-ion battery
- Weight: 798 kg (1,759 lb)
- Fuel: Shell V-Power (Note: Zero Petroleum branding appeared on the C44, but the car used Shell V-Power fuels.)
- Lubricants: Shell Helix Ultra (Note: Sunoco branding appeared on the C44, but the car used Shell Helix lubricants.)
- Brakes: Brembo carbon brake discs and pads with rear brake by wire, Brembo monobloc calipers in nickel-plated aluminium alloy, Brembo tandem brake master cylinders
- Tyres: Pirelli P Zero (dry); Pirelli Cinturato (wet)
- Clutch: Carbon Composite

Competition history
- Notable entrants: Stake F1 Team Kick Sauber
- Notable drivers: 24. Zhou Guanyu; 77. Valtteri Bottas
- Debut: 2024 Bahrain Grand Prix
- Last event: 2024 Abu Dhabi Grand Prix
Races	Wins	Podiums	Poles	F/Laps
24	0	0	0	0

The Kick Sauber C44 is a Formula One car designed and constructed by Stake F1 Team Kick Sauber to compete in the 2024 Formula One World Championship. The car was driven by Valtteri Bottas and Zhou Guanyu, both in their third and final year with the team. The C44 was the first chassis to re-inherit the Sauber name after the team's naming rights partnership with Alfa Romeo ended. While substantially different than the Alfa Romeo C43, the car experienced poor reliability and regressed during the season after upgrades repeatedly failed to address fundamental issues. The C44 relegated Sauber to a last place finish in the World Constructor's Championship for the first time since 2017, scoring four total points in the penultimate race of the season at the Qatar Grand Prix.

== Background ==
=== Development context ===
The C44 was the first Sauber design to be led by James Key, who reunited with then-CEO Andreas Seidl after his dismissal from McLaren. He inherited a design started by longtime Sauber designer Jan Monchaux, who was replaced by Key in August of 2023. Key claimed that the C44 was a clean sheet design, sharing only very select designs with the preceding C43. In a first for the team, the car utilized an in-house transmission casing that housed its customer Ferrari gearbox. The C44's initial design inherited a new pull-rod front suspension as used by Key at McLaren, and featured a new downwards-sloping sidepod with very tight packaging. Following the FIA's investigation into the C42's upside-down crash at the 2022 British Grand Prix, Sauber abandoned its unique roll hoop and air intake designs for a more conventional A-shape design on the C44.

=== Branding and naming rights ===
Following the conclusion of Sauber's naming rights partnership with Alfa Romeo, the team unveiled a new title partnership agreement with the Australian-Curaçaoan online casino Stake. The team sold the C44's chassis naming rights to the company's streaming subsidiary Kick, adopting the latter's branding and altering the team's name in jurisdictions where gambling sponsorships are outlawed.

== Competition and development history ==
The C44 made its track debut at Circuit de Barcelona-Catalunya during a promotional filming exercise, later making its public debut at official preseason testing at Bahrain International Circuit.

=== Opening rounds ===
Following preseason testing, a new front wing was developed and deployed at the third round of the season at the Australian Grand Prix. However, this development was negated by a substantial issue caused by lightweight wheel nuts introduced on the C44. This new design cross-threaded the team's wheel guns and caused dramatically slow pit times upwards of thirty seconds, eliminating the C44 from points contention in the opening rounds. A new ground effect floor introduced at the Emilia Romagna Grand Prix did not have the desired effect, and the car slipped towards the back of the grid. In the first seven rounds of the season, the C44 achieved a best result of eleventh and did not threaten for a points-paying position, with their best qualifying result being a Q3 appearance in Shanghai, where Bottas qualified tenth.

=== Mid-season rounds ===
Bottas at the Austrian Grand Prix.

New rear and beam wings introduced at the Monaco and Canadian Grands Prix did not increase performance, prompting the team to revert Zhou Guanyu to an early-season specification to diagnose engineering correlation issues. At the same time, both drivers expressed concerns with the C44's tyre management capabilities, commenting publicly that they struggled to bring their tyres up to the required operating envelope in both qualifying and race trims. Shortly after the summer break, team owner Audi AG publicly declared that the team's performance was 'unacceptably poor'. Pundits commented that the team's struggles may have derived from Audi's fixation on the 2026 championship and executive infighting that led to Seidl's dismissal from the team during the summer break. In the period from Monaco to the Dutch Grand Prix, the C44 achieved a best result of thirteenth on three occasions and still did not threaten for points.

=== Closing rounds ===
The C44 experienced an aerodynamic breakthrough at the Las Vegas Grand Prix, where a fundamentally redesigned floor geometry changed floor fences, leading edges, and the rear diffuser. Both cars reached Q2 during qualifying, with Zhou finishing in thirteenth on merit ahead of competitors including Aston Martin, Williams, and RB. At the next round in Qatar, the C44 achieved its only points finish of the season in eighth position with Zhou Guanyu. At the final round at Yas Marina, the C44 achieved its only other Q3 appearance with Bottas in ninth position. At the end of the season, the C44 participated in Pirelli tyre testing at Yas Marina Circuit with new drivers Nico Hülkenberg and Gabriel Bortoleto.

== Complete Formula One results ==
Key

Key
Colour	Result
Gold	Winner
Silver	Second place
Bronze	Third place
Green	Other points position
Blue	Other classified position
Blue	Not classified, finished (NC)
Purple	Not classified, retired (Ret)
Red	Did not qualify (DNQ)
Black	Disqualified (DSQ)
White	Did not start (DNS)
White	Race cancelled (C)
Blank	Did not practice (DNP)
Blank	Excluded (EX)
Blank	Did not arrive (DNA)
Blank	Withdrawn (WD)
Blank	Did not enter (empty cell)
Annotation	Meaning
P	Pole position
F	Fastest lap
Superscript number	Points-scoring position in sprint

Year	Entrant	Engine	Tyres	Drivers	Grands Prix																								Points	WCC
Year	Entrant	Engine	Tyres	Drivers	BHR	SAU	AUS	JPN	CHN	MIA	EMI	MON	CAN	ESP	AUT	GBR	HUN	BEL	NED	ITA	AZE	SIN	USA	MXC	SAP	LVG	QAT	ABU	Points	WCC
2024	Stake F1 Team Kick Sauber	Ferrari; 066/12; 1.6 V6 t	P	(Finland) Valtteri Bottas	19	17	14	14	Ret	16	18	13	13	16	16	15	16	15	19	16	16	16	17	14	13	18	11	Ret	4	10th
2024	Stake F1 Team Kick Sauber	Ferrari; 066/12; 1.6 V6 t	P	(China) Zhou Guanyu	11	18	15	Ret	14	14	15	16	15	13	17	18	19	Ret	20	18	14	15	19	15	15	13	8	13	4	10th
