= 2024 Berlin ePrix =

Race 9 of 16 of the 2023–24 Formula E season
← Previous race	Next race →
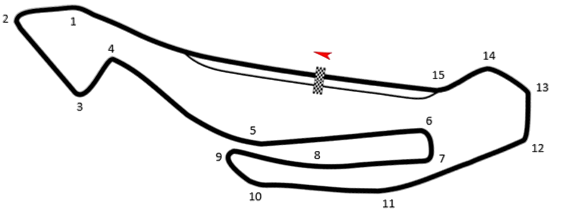

Race details
- Date: 11 May 2024
- Official name: 2024 SUN MINIMEAL Berlin E-Prix
- Location: Tempelhof Airport Street Circuit, Berlin
- Course: Street circuit
- Course length: 2.343 km (1.456 mi)
- Distance: 46 (Note: 40 planned laps and 6 extra laps) laps, 107.778 km (66.970 mi)
- Scheduled distance: 40 laps, 93.720 km (58.235 mi)

Pole position
Driver	(Switzerland) Edoardo Mortara	Mahindra
- Time: 1:01:741

Fastest lap
Driver	(France) Norman Nato	Andretti-Porsche
- Time: 1:02:972 on lap 43

Podium
First	(New Zealand) Nick Cassidy	Jaguar
Second	(France) Jean-Éric Vergne	DS Penske
Third	(United Kingdom) Oliver Rowland	Nissan

2024 Berlin ePrix
Race 10 of 16 of the 2023–24 Formula E season
← Previous race	Next race →
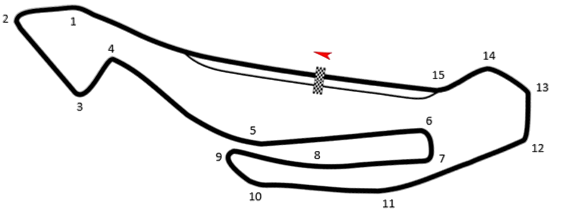

Race details
- Date: 12 May 2024
- Official name: 2024 SUN MINIMEAL Berlin E-Prix
- Location: Tempelhof Airport Street Circuit, Berlin
- Course: Street circuit
- Course length: 2.343 km (1.456 mi)
- Distance: 41 (Note: 38 planned laps and 3 extra laps) laps, 96.063 km (59.691 mi)
- Scheduled distance: 38 laps, 89.034 km (55.323 mi)
- Weather: Sunny

Pole position
Driver	(United Kingdom) Jake Dennis	Andretti-Porsche
- Time: 1:01.819

Fastest lap
Driver	(New Zealand) Nick Cassidy	Jaguar
- Time: 1:03.728 on lap 40

Podium
First	(Portugal) António Félix da Costa	Porsche
Second	(New Zealand) Nick Cassidy	Jaguar
Third	(United Kingdom) Oliver Rowland	Nissan

The 2024 Berlin ePrix, known for sponsorship reasons as the 2024 SUN MINIMEAL Berlin E-Prix, was a pair of Formula E electric car races held at the Tempelhof Airport Street Circuit at Tempelhof Airport in the outskirts of Berlin, Germany on 11 and 12 May 2024. It served as the ninth and tenth rounds of the 2023–24 Formula E season, and marked the tenth edition of the Berlin ePrix, the only event to have featured in every season of the Formula E championship.

The first race was won by Nick Cassidy for Jaguar TCS Racing, with Jean-Éric Vergne and Oliver Rowland in second and third place respectively. The second race was won by António Félix da Costa for the Porsche Formula E Team, with Nick Cassidy and Oliver Rowland completing the podium.

== Background ==
Pascal Wehrlein leads into Berlin with 102 points and a 7-point lead over Nick Cassidy. Followed by Jake Dennis, Oliver Rowland and Mitch Evans, all within 25-point deficits to Wehrlein.

=== Driver changes ===
Multiple drivers would miss the Berlin E-Prix because of a schedule conflict with the FIA World Endurance Championship's 6 Hours of Spa-Francorchamps. Both Envision Racing drivers would be replaced by Joel Eriksson and Paul Aron. Mahindra Racing's Nyck de Vries would be replaced by Jordan King. ABT CUPRA's reserve driver Kelvin van der Linde would replace Nico Müller. McLaren reserve driver Taylor Barnard continued to deputise for Sam Bird, who was still recovering from his hand injury sustained at Monaco.

== Classification ==
All times are in CEST.

=== Race one ===
==== Qualification ====
Qualification took place at 10:20 AM on 11 May.

Group draw
Group A	(Germany) WEH	(United Kingdom) DEN	(New Zealand) EVA	(France) JEV	(Portugal) DAC	(France) FEN	(United Kingdom) TIC	(India) DAR	(Switzerland) MOR	(Sweden) ERI	(United Kingdom) KIN
Group B	(New Zealand) CAS	(United Kingdom) ROW	(Germany) GUE	(Belgium) VAN	(United Kingdom) HUG	(France) NAT	(Brazil) SET	(Brazil) DIG	(United Kingdom) BAR	(South Africa) VDG	(Estonia) ARO

===== Qualifying duels =====
Quarter-finals
A2	(Germany) Pascal Wehrlein
A3	(France) Jean-Éric Vergne
A1	(Switzerland) Edoardo Mortara
A4	(India) Jehan Daruvala
B2	(Germany) Maximilian Günther
B3	(Belgium) Stoffel Vandoorne
B1	(Brazil) Lucas di Grassi
B4	(Brazil) Sérgio Sette Câmara

Semi-finals
(France) Jean-Éric Vergne
(Switzerland) Edoardo Mortara
(Belgium) Stoffel Vandoorne
(Brazil) Sérgio Sette Câmara

Final
(Switzerland) Edoardo Mortara
(Belgium) Stoffel Vandoorne

==== Overall classification ====
Pos.	No.	Driver	Team	A	B	QF	SF	F	Grid
1	48	(Switzerland) Edoardo Mortara	Mahindra	1:02.619	—N/a	1:02:078	1:01.850	1:01.741	1
2	2	(Belgium) Stoffel Vandoorne	DS Penske	—N/a	1:02.717	1:01:910	1:01.844	1:02.008	2
3	25	(France) Jean-Éric Vergne	DS Penske	1:02.776	—N/a	1:02:212	1:01:959	—N/a	3
4	3	(Brazil) Sérgio Sette Câmara	ERT	—N/a	1:02.761	1:02:159	1:02:031	—N/a	4
5	7	(Germany) Maximilian Günther	Maserati	—N/a	1:02.713	1:02.156	—N/a	—N/a	5
6	94	(Germany) Pascal Wehrlein	Porsche	1:02:771	—N/a	1:02:294	—N/a	—N/a	6
7	18	(India) Jehan Daruvala	Maserati	1:02:801	—N/a	1:02:332	—N/a	—N/a	7
8	11	(Brazil) Lucas di Grassi	ABT Cupra-Mahindra	—N/a	1:02:615	1:02:388	—N/a	—N/a	8
9	13	(Portugal) António Félix da Costa	Porsche	1:02.885	—N/a	—N/a	—N/a	—N/a	9
10	37	(New Zealand) Nick Cassidy	Jaguar	—N/a	1:02.840	—N/a	—N/a	—N/a	10
11	9	(New Zealand) Mitch Evans	Jaguar	1:02.893	—N/a	—N/a	—N/a	—N/a	11
12	51	(South Africa) Kelvin van der Linde	ABT Cupra-Mahindra	—N/a	1:02.870	—N/a	—N/a	—N/a	12
13	33	(United Kingdom) Dan Ticktum	ERT	1:02.943	—N/a	—N/a	—N/a	—N/a	13
14	8	(United Kingdom) Taylor Barnard	McLaren-Nissan	—N/a	1:02:926	—N/a	—N/a	—N/a	14
15	21	(United Kingdom) Jordan King	Mahindra	1:02:954	—N/a	—N/a	—N/a	—N/a	15
16	22	(United Kingdom) Oliver Rowland	Nissan	—N/a	1:02.948	—N/a	—N/a	—N/a	16
17	23	(France) Sacha Fenestraz	Nissan	1:03.093	—N/a	—N/a	—N/a	—N/a	17
18	5	(United Kingdom) Jake Hughes	McLaren-Nissan	—N/a	1:03.037	—N/a	—N/a	—N/a	18
19	4	(Sweden) Joel Eriksson	Envision-Jaguar	1:03.094	—N/a	—N/a	—N/a	—N/a	19
20	16	(Estonia) Paul Aron	Envision-Jaguar	—N/a	1:03.092	—N/a	—N/a	—N/a	20
21	1	(United Kingdom) Jake Dennis	Andretti-Porsche	1:03.110	—N/a	—N/a	—N/a	—N/a	21
22	17	(France) Norman Nato	Andretti-Porsche	—N/a	1:03.159	—N/a	—N/a	—N/a	22

==== Race ====
The race took place on 11 May at 3:03 PM.

Pos.	No.	Driver	Team	Laps	Time/Retired	Grid	Points
1	37	(New Zealand) Nick Cassidy	Jaguar	46	1:01:54.939	9	25+1^{2}
2	25	(France) Jean-Éric Vergne	DS Penske	46	+4.651	3	18
3	22	(United Kingdom) Oliver Rowland	Nissan	46	+4.915	15	15
4	9	(New Zealand) Mitch Evans	Jaguar	46	+5.340	10	12
5	94	(Germany) Pascal Wehrlein	Porsche	46	+5.631	6	10
6	13	(Portugal) António Félix da Costa	Porsche	46	+5.760	8	8
7	2	(Belgium) Stoffel Vandoorne	DS Penske	46	+6.363	2	6
8	48	(Switzerland) Edoardo Mortara	Mahindra	46	+7.221	1	4+3^{1}
9	23	(France) Sacha Fenestraz	Nissan	46	+9.592	16	2
10	8	(United Kingdom) Taylor Barnard	McLaren-Nissan	46	+9.644	13	1
11	51	(South Africa) Kelvin van der Linde	ABT Cupra-Mahindra	46	+10.133	11	
12	21	(United Kingdom) Jordan King	Mahindra	46	+10.427	14	
13	16	(Estonia) Paul Aron	Envision-Jaguar	46	+11.598	19	
14	33	(United Kingdom) Dan Ticktum	ERT	46	+18.270	12	
15	5	(United Kingdom) Jake Hughes	McLaren-Nissan	46	+55.538	17	
16	3	(Brazil) Sérgio Sette Câmara	ERT	45	+1 lap	4	
17	18	(India) Jehan Daruvala	Maserati	45	+1 lap	22	
18	17	(France) Norman Nato	Andretti-Porsche	45	+1 lap	21	
Ret	1	(United Kingdom) Jake Dennis	Andretti-Porsche	38	Puncture	20	
Ret	7	(Germany) Maximilian Günther	Maserati	28	Collision	5	
Ret	11	(Brazil) Lucas di Grassi	ABT Cupra-Mahindra	20	Collision Damage	7	
Ret	4	(Sweden) Joel Eriksson	Envision-Jaguar	9		18	

Notes:

- ^1 – Pole position.
- ^2 – Fastest lap.

==== Standings after the race ====
Drivers' Championship standings

	Pos	Driver	Points
1	1	(New Zealand) Nick Cassidy	121
1	2	(Germany) Pascal Wehrlein	112
1	3	(United Kingdom) Oliver Rowland	103
1	4	(United Kingdom) Jake Dennis	89
	5	(New Zealand) Mitch Evans	89

Teams' Championship standings

	Pos	Team	Points
	1	(United Kingdom) Jaguar	210
	2	(Germany) Porsche	146
1	3	(Japan) Nissan	129
1	4	(United States) DS Penske	126
2	5	(United States) Andretti	113

Manufacturers' Trophy standings

	Pos	Manufacturer	Points
1	1	(United Kingdom) Jaguar	239
1	2	(Germany) Porsche	227
	3	(Japan) Nissan	183
	4	(Netherlands) Stellantis	179
1	5	(India) Mahindra	26

- Notes: Only the top five positions are included for all three sets of standings.

=== Race two ===
==== Qualification ====
Qualification took place at 10:20 AM on 12 May.

Group draw
Group A	(New Zealand) CAS	(United Kingdom) ROW	(New Zealand) EVA	(Germany) GUE	(Portugal) DAC	(United Kingdom) HUG	(United Kingdom) TIC	(Switzerland) MOR	(Brazil) DIG	(South Africa) VDG	(Estonia) ARO
Group B	(Germany) WEH	(United Kingdom) DEN	(France) JEV	(Belgium) VAN	(France) FEN	(France) NAT	(Brazil) SET	(India) DAR	(United Kingdom) BAR	(United Kingdom) KIN	(Sweden) ERI

===== Qualifying duels =====
Quarter-finals
A2	(Germany) Maximilian Günther
A3	(New Zealand) Mitch Evans
A1	(New Zealand) Nick Cassidy
A4	(Switzerland) Edoardo Mortara
B2	(France) Norman Nato
B3	(Belgium) Stoffel Vandoorne
B1	(United Kingdom) Jake Dennis
B4	(Germany) Pascal Wehrlein

Semi-finals
(New Zealand) Mitch Evans
(New Zealand) Nick Cassidy
(France) Norman Nato
(United Kingdom) Jake Dennis

Final
(New Zealand) Nick Cassidy
(United Kingdom) Jake Dennis

==== Overall classification ====
Pos.	No.	Driver	Team	A	B	QF	SF	F	Grid
1	1	(United Kingdom) Jake Dennis	Andretti-Porsche	—N/a	1:02:518	1:02:049	1:02:088	1:01:819	1
2	37	(New Zealand) Nick Cassidy	Jaguar	1:02.544	—N/a	1:01:994	1:02:067	1:02:050	2
3	17	(France) Norman Nato	Andretti-Porsche	—N/a	1:02.558	1:02.056	1:02.218	—N/a	3
4	9	(New Zealand) Mitch Evans	Jaguar	1:02:655	—N/a	1:02:056	1:02:218	—N/a	4
5	7	(Germany) Maximilian Günther	Maserati	1:02.639	—N/a	1:02.165	—N/a	—N/a	5
6	94	(Germany) Pascal Wehrlein	Porsche	—N/a	1:02:601	1:02:217	—N/a	—N/a	6
7	48	(Switzerland) Edoardo Mortara	Mahindra	1:02:655	—N/a	1:02:248	—N/a	—N/a	7
8	2	(Belgium) Stoffel Vandoorne	DS Penske	—N/a	1:02:577		—N/a	—N/a	8
9	25	(France) Jean-Éric Vergne	DS Penske	—N/a	1:02:610	—N/a	—N/a	—N/a	9
10	13	(Portugal) António Félix da Costa	Porsche	1:02.717	—N/a	—N/a	—N/a	—N/a	10
11	4	(Sweden) Joel Eriksson	Envision-Jaguar	—N/a	1:02:670	—N/a	—N/a	—N/a	11
12	11	(Brazil) Lucas di Grassi	ABT Cupra-Mahindra	1:02:729	—N/a	—N/a	—N/a	—N/a	12
13	18	(India) Jehan Daruvala	Maserati	—N/a	1:02:693	—N/a	—N/a	—N/a	13
14	5	(United Kingdom) Jake Hughes	McLaren-Nissan	1:02.754	—N/a	—N/a	—N/a	—N/a	14
15	3	(Brazil) Sérgio Sette Câmara	ERT	—N/a	1:02.761	—N/a	—N/a	—N/a	15
16	22	(United Kingdom) Oliver Rowland	Nissan	1:02:757	—N/a	—N/a	—N/a	—N/a	16
17	23	(France) Sacha Fenestraz	Nissan	—N/a	1:02.827	—N/a	—N/a	—N/a	17
18	33	(United Kingdom) Dan Ticktum	ERT	1:02.789	—N/a	—N/a	—N/a	—N/a	18
19	8	(United Kingdom) Taylor Barnard	McLaren-Nissan	—N/a	1:02:916	—N/a	—N/a	—N/a	19
20	16	(Estonia) Paul Aron	Envision-Jaguar	1:02.918	—N/a	—N/a	—N/a	—N/a	20
21	21	(United Kingdom) Jordan King	Mahindra	—N/a	1:03:034	—N/a	—N/a	—N/a	21
22	51	(South Africa) Kelvin van der Linde	ABT Cupra-Mahindra	1:02:969	—N/a	—N/a	—N/a	—N/a	22

==== Race ====
The race took place on 12 May at 3:03 PM.

Pos.	No.	Driver	Team	Laps	Time/Retired	Grid	Points
1	13	(Portugal) António Félix da Costa	Porsche	41	47:55:043	10	25
2	37	(New Zealand) Nick Cassidy	Jaguar	41	+0.691	2	18+1^{2}
3	22	(United Kingdom) Oliver Rowland	Nissan	41	+2.820	16	15
4	94	(Germany) Pascal Wehrlein	Porsche	41	+4.147	6	12
5	1	(United Kingdom) Jake Dennis	Andretti-Porsche	41	+4.548	1	10+3^{1}
6	9	(New Zealand) Mitch Evans	Jaguar	41	+4.953	4	8
7	18	(India) Jehan Daruvala	Maserati	41	+6.032	13	6
8	8	(United Kingdom) Taylor Barnard	McLaren-Nissan	41	+6.698	18	4
9	4	(Sweden) Joel Eriksson	Envision-Jaguar	41	+7.119	11	2
10	25	(France) Jean-Éric Vergne	DS Penske	41	+7.357	9	1
11	11	(Brazil) Lucas di Grassi	ABT Cupra-Mahindra	41	+8.204	12	
12	5	(United Kingdom) Jake Hughes	McLaren-Nissan	41	+10.349	14	
13	3	(Brazil) Sérgio Sette Câmara	ERT	41	+10.403	15	
14	16	(Estonia) Paul Aron	Envision-Jaguar	41	+11.124	19	
15	51	(South Africa) Kelvin van der Linde	ABT Cupra-Mahindra	41	+11.780	21	
16	48	(Switzerland) Edoardo Mortara	Mahindra	41	+12.143	7	
17	33	(United Kingdom) Dan Ticktum	ERT	41	+12.642	22	
18	21	(United Kingdom) Jordan King	Mahindra	41	+16.494	20	
19	17	(France) Norman Nato	Andretti-Porsche	41	+20.851	3	
20	2	(Belgium) Stoffel Vandoorne	DS Penske	41	+36.753	8	
Ret	23	(France) Sacha Fenestraz	Nissan	24	Collision	17	
Ret	7	(Germany) Maximilian Günther	Maserati	10	Collision/Accident	5	

Notes:

- ^1 – Pole position.
- ^2 – Fastest lap.

==== Standings after the race ====
Drivers' Championship standings

Pos	Driver	Points
1	(New Zealand) Nick Cassidy	140
2	(Germany) Pascal Wehrlein	124
3	(United Kingdom) Oliver Rowland	118
4	(United Kingdom) Jake Dennis	102
5	(New Zealand) Mitch Evans	97

Teams' Championship standings

Pos	Team	Points
1	(United Kingdom) Jaguar	237
2	(Germany) Porsche	183
3	(Japan) Nissan	144
4	(United States) DS Penske	127
5	(United States) Andretti	126

Manufacturers' Trophy standings

Pos	Manufacturer	Points
1	(United Kingdom) Jaguar	266
2	(Germany) Porsche	264
3	(Japan) Nissan	202
4	(Netherlands) Stellantis	186
5	(India) Mahindra	26

- Notes: Only the top five positions are included for all three sets of standings.

== Notes ==
Previous race: 2024 Monaco ePrix	FIA Formula E World Championship; 2023–24 season	Next race: 2024 Shanghai ePrix
Previous race: 2023 Berlin ePrix	Berlin ePrix	Next race: 2025 Berlin ePrix
