= Stefan Dreyer =

German engineer

- Born: Stefan Denis Dreyer; 1973 (age 52–53); Stuttgart, West Germany
- Occupation: Engineer
- Employer: Audi Formula Racing GmbH
- Known for: Formula One engineer
- Title: Chief technical officer

Stefan Denis Dreyer is a German motorsport and Formula One engineer. He is currently the chief technical officer for Audi Formula Racing GmbH. He is responsible for the technical development of Audi’s Formula One power unit which currently competes in the sport since 2026.

== Career ==
Dreyer was born in Stuttgart in 1973. He studied Mechanical Engineering at the Ulm University of Applied Sciences, completing his thesis in collaboration with Audi.

He joined Audi Sport in 1999 as an engineer working on sports and special-application engines. He later became Project Leader for DTM engine development, before moving into roles overseeing engine testing and race operations in Audi’s Le Mans and FIA World Endurance Championship programmes. From 2016 to 2017, Dreyer served as Head of LMP, followed by positions as Head of Powertrain Development (2017–2020) and Head of Development for Audi Sport (2020–2022).

During this period, he was involved across Audi’s major factory racing projects, including Le Mans prototypes, DTM, Formula E, and rally-raid competition.

Dreyer has been involved in the planning of Audi’s Formula One power unit programme from its inception, including discussions with the FIA concerning the new power unit regulations due to be introduced in 2026, when Audi is scheduled to enter Formula One by taking over the Sauber team.

In 2023, Dreyer became Chief Technical Officer of Audi Formula Racing GmbH, based in Neuburg. He is responsible for the technical development of Audi’s F1 power unit. Since May 2025, he has additionally served as spokesperson of the AFR management board.
