= Tony Salter =

British engineer

- Citizenship: British
- Education: University of Glasgow
- Occupation: Aerodynamicist
- Employer: Audi Revolut F1 Team
- Title: Chief aerodynamicist

Tony Salter is a British Formula One and motorsport aerodynamicist. He works as Chief aerodynamicist at the Audi Revolut F1 Team.

== Career ==
Salter studied Aerospace, Aeronautical and Astronautical Engineering at the University of Glasgow, graduating in 1998. He began his motorsport career with Reynard Motorsport, joining the Oxfordshire-based constructor through its graduate engineering programme. After an initial rotation across departments, he moved into the company's computational fluid dynamics (CFD) group, contributing to aerodynamic development for IndyCar programmes and helping expand Reynard's early use of simulation tools in race-car design.

In 2001, Salter joined Williams Racing as an aerodynamicist. He worked on the development of the Williams FW24 and Williams FW25, both of which finished second in the Constructors’ Championship, contributing to aerodynamic design, wind-tunnel testing and CFD correlation during a period in which the team was regularly competing at the front of the grid. He subsequently progressed through the department to become Senior Aerodynamicist and later Principal Aerodynamicist, remaining with Williams across multiple regulation changes. During this time he also played a role in the aerodynamic development of the Williams FW31, including work related to the introduction of the double-diffuser concept in the 2009 season.

Salter moved to the Sauber F1 Team in 2011 as Group Leader, Aerodynamics. In this role he led the group responsible for defining the car's aerodynamic direction, coordinating design office, CFD and wind-tunnel activities. He was closely involved in the development of Sauber's innovative Coandă-effect exhaust layouts on the Sauber C31 and Sauber C32. The C31 proved particularly competitive, scoring three podium finishes and on occasion challenging for race victories during the 2012 season.

In 2014 he joined McLaren as a Principal Aerodynamicist, during a period of restructuring within the Woking-based team. He was promoted to Deputy Head of Aerodynamics in 2019 and subsequently to Director of Aerodynamics in 2020. In this capacity he oversaw aerodynamic concept development, wind-tunnel testing and CFD methodology, leading the department through the introduction of the 2022 ground-effect technical regulations. He left the team in early 2023.

In late 2023, Salter returned to the Sauber organisation to support the transition to the Audi F1 Team, initially serving as Head of Aerodynamic Concept. In 2025 he was appointed Chief Aerodynamicist, assuming overall responsibility for aerodynamic strategy and development of Audi's first Formula One challenger, the Audi R26.
