= Audi V6 hybrid Formula One power unit =

Audi V6 turbo-hybrid power unit

Overview
- Manufacturer: Audi Formula Racing GmbH
- Designer: Stefan Dreyer (Chief Technical Officer)
- Production: 2026–present

Layout
- Configuration: V-6 single hybrid turbocharged engine, 90° cylinder angle with TFSI technology
- Displacement: 1.6 L (98 cu in)
- Cylinder bore: 80 mm (3.15 in)
- Piston stroke: 53 mm (2.09 in)
- Valvetrain: 24-valve (four-valves per cylinder), DOHC
- Compression ratio: 16:1

Combustion
- Turbocharger: turbocharger
- Fuel system: 350 bar (5,076 psi) gasoline direct injection
- Management: Motion Applied TAG-700
- Fuel type: BP Ultimate Advanced Sustainable Fuel (100%)
- Oil system: Dry sump
- Cooling system: Single water pump

The Audi V6 hybrid Formula One power unit is a series of 1.6-litre, hybrid turbocharged V6 racing engines which features kinetic energy recovery system (MGU-K) that provides nearly half the horsepower of the power unit. This was developed and produced by Audi Formula Racing GmbH for use in Formula One with the familiar TFSI technology that is found in every Audi petrol turbocharged-powered road car. The engines are in use from the 2026 season onwards by the Audi works team exclusively.

== List of Formula One engines ==
Specifications of the Audi V6 hybrid Formula One power unit
Season	Name	Format	Max. system outputs (est.)	Notes
2026	AFR 26 Hybrid	1.600 L 90° V6 turbo hybrid	Internal Combustion Engine 400 kW (540 hp); Energy Recovery System 350 kW (470 hp); Total 750 kW (1,010 hp)	

== See also ==
- Ferrari V6 hybrid Formula One power unit
- Honda V6 hybrid Formula One power unit
- Mercedes V6 hybrid Formula One power unit
- Red Bull Ford V6 hybrid Formula One power unit
