= Alessandro Cinelli =

Italian engineer

- Born: 29 April 1975 (age 51); Rome, Italy
- Education: Imperial College London
- Occupation: Engineer
- Employer: Audi Revolut F1 Team
- Title: Head of Aerodynamic Operations and Technology

Alessandro Cinelli (born 29 April 1975) is an Italian Formula One aerodynamicist. He is the Head of Aerodynamic Operations and Technology at the Audi Revolut F1 Team.

== Career ==
Cinelli studied aeronautical engineering at Imperial College London. He began his motorsport career at Tyrrell Racing in 1997 as an aerodynamicist, before moving to Williams Racing in 1998, where he worked as an aerodynamics engineer on wind-tunnel development.

In 2002, he joined Scuderia Ferrari as a Formula One aerodynamics engineer, initially focusing on track testing and correlation work between on-track data and wind-tunnel simulations. From 2004 to 2009, he progressed to the race team as Head of Trackside Aerodynamics, overseeing aerodynamic performance development during Grand Prix weekends.

In 2009, Cinelli was appointed Head of Aerodynamic Performance, where in addition to leading the aerodynamic group trackside, he also led on ensuring the success of the Scuderia's aerodynamic upgrade packages throughout the season. He later became Head of Aero Experimental Group in 2015, managing wind-tunnel operations and testing methodologies.

In August 2019, Cinelli joined Sauber Motorsport, who at the time competed as Alfa Romeo, as Head of Aerodynamics - leading the overall aerodynamic department, including CFD, wind-tunnel development, and performance correlation. Following Sauber's transition into the Audi Formula One works programme, he continues in this role.
