= Audi in Formula One =

Formula One constructor

(Germany) Audi
- Full name: Audi Revolut F1 Team
- Base: Hinwil, Zurich, Switzerland; Bicester, Oxfordshire, United Kingdom, Neuburg an der Donau, Bavaria, Germany
- Team principal(s): Mattia Binotto (CEO and Team Principal); Allan McNish (Racing Director)
- Technical director: James Key
- Website: audif1.com
- Previous name: Sauber Motorsport AG

2026 Formula One World Championship
- Race drivers: 5. (Brazil) Gabriel Bortoleto; 27. (Germany) Nico Hülkenberg
- Test driver(s): (United Kingdom) Freddie Slater
- Chassis: R26
- Engine: Audi AFR 26 Hybrid
- Tyres: Pirelli

Formula One World Championship career
- First entry: 2026 Australian Grand Prix
- Last entry: 2026 São Paulo Grand Prix
- Races entered: 20 (20 starts)
- Engines: Audi
- Constructors' Championships: 0
- Drivers' Championships: 0
- Race victories: 0
- Podiums: 0
- Points: 28
- Pole positions: 0
- Fastest laps: 0

German car manufacturer Audi has competed in Formula One as a constructor and power unit manufacturer since 2026. Their current iteration, Audi Motorsport AG, competing as Audi Revolut F1 Team, was formed through the acquisition of Sauber Motorsport, with power units developed by Audi Formula Racing GmbH.

Prior to World War II, Audi's predecessor Auto Union contested Grand Prix motor racing from 1935 to 1939. Audi announced their intention to acquire Sauber—who debuted in 1993—and its Swiss facilities in 2022, ahead of new power unit and chassis regulations in 2026. The project expanded to a power unit facility in Bavaria and a technology centre in the "Motorsport Valley" of Oxfordshire, England.

== Background ==
=== Pre–World War II Grands Prix (1935–1939) ===
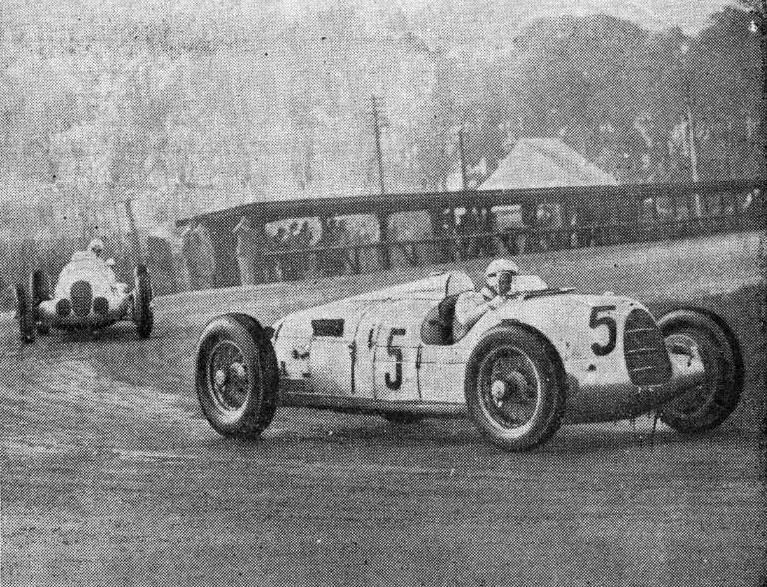
Auto Union, the predecessor of Audi, competed in Grand Prix motor racing from 1935 to 1939, winning the European Drivers' Championship in 1936 with Bernd Rosemeyer.

Audi as a Formula One engine manufacturer
- Official name(s): Audi Formula Racing GmbH
- Base: Neuburg, Bavaria, Germany

Formula One World Championship career
- First entry: 2026 Australian Grand Prix
- Last entry: 2026 São Paulo Grand Prix
- Races entered: 20 (20 starts)
- Chassis: Audi
- Constructors' Championships: 0
- Race victories: 0
- Podiums: 0
- Points: 28
- Pole positions: 0
- Fastest laps: 0

Whilst the modern Audi company has never entered Grand Prix motor racing, its predecessor company Auto Union had competed in Grand Prix racing from 1935 to 1939, prior to World War II and the inception of the Formula One World Championship in 1950.

Auto Union was founded in 1932, during the Great Depression, as a merger of four struggling automotive firms: Audi, DKW, Horch, and Wanderer. The following year, German Chancellor Adolf Hitler announced a state-sponsored motor racing programme with Mercedes-Benz. Upon request from Ferdinand Porsche, Hitler agreed that competition between two German firms would improve their chances of victory and national glory; an annual 500,000 ℛℳ (£40,000; £2,480,000 in 2025) prize for the most successful car between Auto Union and Mercedes-Benz was announced, eventually rising to 3,125,000 ℛℳ (£250,000; £15,470,000 in 2025) and prompting a heated rivalry.

Across five seasons in the AIACR European Championship, Auto Union won seven Grandes Épreuves and 14 non-championship Grands Prix. Bernd Rosemeyer claimed European Drivers' Championship in 1936, driving the Type C, with victories at the German, Swiss, and Italian Grands Prix. Hermann Paul Müller—driving the Type D—unofficially won the final edition in 1939, with the title not awarded due to the onset of World War II in Europe following the invasion of Poland. Auto Union was later absorbed by Volkswagen in 1964, becoming the modern-day Audi company.

=== Zürich-based constructors (1993–2025) ===
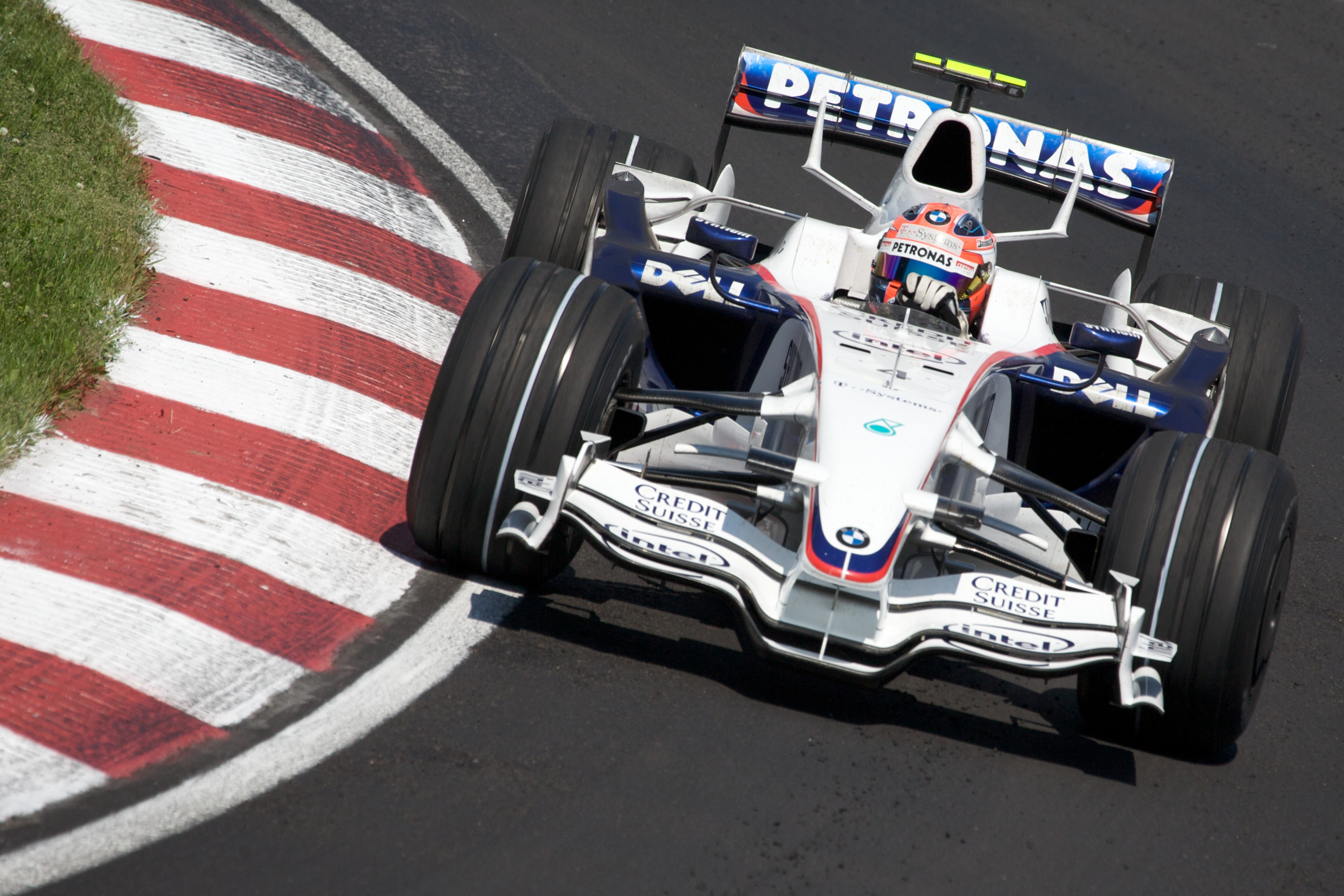
Sauber were previously partnered with Mercedes-Benz, Ford, Ferrari (including Petronas rebadging era), BMW, and Alfa Romeo; it achieved its only victory at the 2008 Canadian Grand Prix with BMW and Robert Kubica.

The antecedent constructor to Audi based in Hinwil—Sauber—made its Formula One debut in 1993, having contested sportscar racing since 1970. The team was partnered with Mercedes-Benz until 1994, Ford until 1996, and Ferrari (rebadged as Petronas) until 2005, before becoming the factory team for BMW from 2006 to 2009. Sauber claimed its highest finishes in the World Constructors' Championship with second and third in 2007 and 2008, respectively, the former after a disqualification for McLaren and the latter including its sole victory at the Canadian Grand Prix with Robert Kubica. It returned as an independent constructor in 2010 with Ferrari engines, repurchased by Peter Sauber following the Great Recession and a failed shell company acquisition. A title sponsorship deal with Alfa Romeo in 2018 led to a full rebrand from 2019 to 2023, after which it switched to support from Stake and Kick.

== Constructor history ==
=== Establishment (2022–2025) ===
In August 2022, Audi announced that it would enter Formula One as a power unit manufacturer in 2026—the planned year for a regulation overhaul. That October, Audi confirmed its rumoured partnership with Sauber, acquiring a stake in the company for a full rebrand and power unit deal. In November 2024, the Qatar Investment Authority purchased a minority stake in the team. The investment was described as a "substantial minority" stake in Sauber Holding AG, with Audi and QIA stating that the funding would support the expansion of personnel and facilities ahead of the team's planned 2026 entry.

Veteran driver Nico Hülkenberg and rookie Gabriel Bortoleto joined Sauber on separate multi-year contracts from 2025 onwards, thus becoming Audi's driver lineup upon its debut. Neel Jani was signed as a simulator driver to assist with car development. By July of that year, Sauber opened the Sauber Motorsport Technology Centre in Bicester Motion, Oxfordshire, with the aim of attracting specialised personnel to join the team in the "Motorsport Valley" region of England. The technology centre aims to complement the primary headquarters in Hinwil, Switzerland, where the chassis is constructed. Audi signed a multi-year deal with British financial technology company Revolut to become the title sponsor of the team. In December 2025, the team unveiled its official Audi Revolut F1 Team name and logo, while Sauber Motorsport AG was set to be renamed Audi Motorsport AG as part of the transition.

=== Debut (2026) ===
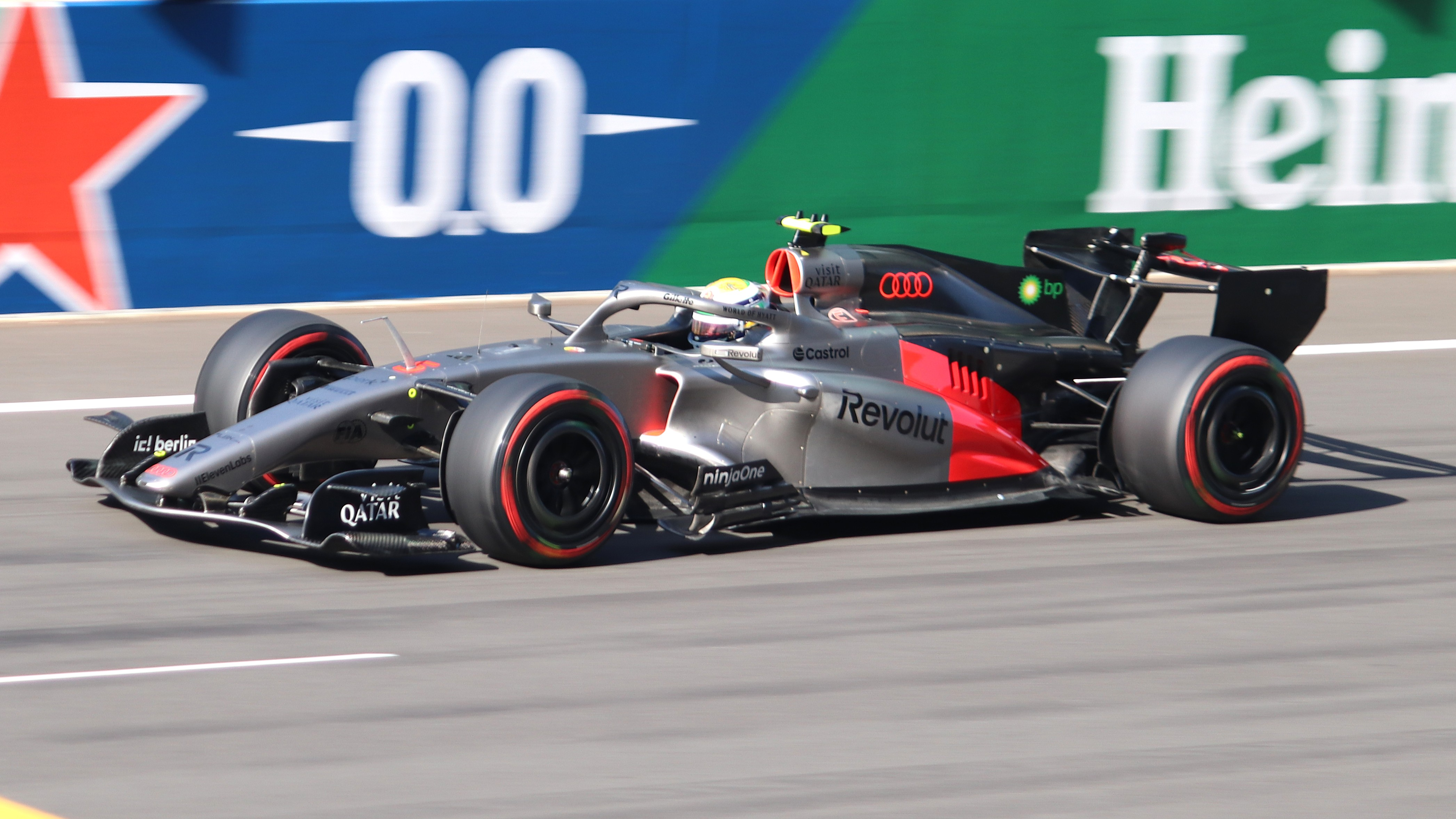
Gabriel Bortoleto's Audi R26 qualifying for the 2026 Chinese Grand Prix

At the team's Berlin launch in January 2026, Audi said it had begun a five-year plan aimed at challenging for championships by 2030. Audi debuted at the season-opening Australian Grand Prix in 2026 with the R26, designed for new chassis and power unit regulations. Gabriel Bortoleto and Nico Hülkenberg qualified 10th and 11th respectively. Bortoleto finished the race in 9th place, scoring Audi's first ever points in Formula One, while Hülkenberg was unable to take the start due to technical issues. Roles were reversed in China, with Bortoleto unable to start as Hülkenberg brought home a P11, after unfortunate safety car timing. The unluckiness of the safety car continued in Japan, where Hülkenberg brought home another P11, while Bortoleto finished 13th after a poor start.

The team would not finish in the points again until the British Grand Prix, where Bortoleto finished 8th under the safety car. More points would follow for Bortoleto in Belgium, where another P8 finish would score the team their first consecutive points. Hülkenberg would score his first points of the season, finishing in P9 in another consecutive points finish at the Hungarian Grand Prix. This allowed Audi to overtake Williams for 8th place in the Constructors' standings by one point.

Audi continued its scoring streak at the Dutch Grand Prix as Hülkenberg earned four points by finishing in eighth position. Bortoleto ended up finishing 13th. In the Italian Grand Prix, neither driver scored, with Bortoleto and Hülkenberg finishing in 11th and 12th respectively. At the Spanish Grand Prix, Hülkenberg earned points with a 10th place finish while Bortoleto was only able to finish 13th. Hülkenberg's performance boosted Audi's points total to 17.

== Team information ==
=== Constructor personnel ===
From its establishment, Jonathan Wheatley was the inaugural team principal of Audi. Following his departure in March 2026, project head Mattia Binotto was appointed Team Principal. James Key serves as Audi's Technical Director.

On 24 April 2026, it was announced that Allan McNish, the current Director of the Driver Development Programme, would assume the role of Racing Director, being accountable for trackside operations at a Grand Prix weekend. In addition, Mattia Binotto's title was changed to CEO and Team Principal of the team.

=== Driver development programme ===
On 23 January 2026, Audi launched their driver development programme, being led by former Formula One driver Allan McNish.

=== Power unit programme ===
The Audi power unit programme will be operated by the subsidiary Audi Formula Racing GmbH, based in Neuburg an der Donau, Bavaria, Germany.

=== Racing licence and facilities ===
Audi competes with a German racing licence and is based at three facilities across Europe:

- Chassis department: former Sauber headquarters in Hinwil, Zurich, Switzerland;
- Technology centre: Bicester Motion in Bicester, Oxfordshire, England;
- Power unit department: Neuburg an der Donau, Bavaria, Germany.

== Complete Formula One results ==
Key

Key
Colour	Result
Gold	Winner
Silver	Second place
Bronze	Third place
Green	Other points position
Blue	Other classified position
Blue	Not classified, finished (NC)
Purple	Not classified, retired (Ret)
Red	Did not qualify (DNQ)
Black	Disqualified (DSQ)
White	Did not start (DNS)
White	Race cancelled (C)
Blank	Did not practice (DNP)
Blank	Excluded (EX)
Blank	Did not arrive (DNA)
Blank	Withdrawn (WD)
Blank	Did not enter (empty cell)
Annotation	Meaning
P	Pole position
F	Fastest lap
Superscript number	Points-scoring position in sprint

Year	Chassis	Engine	Tyres	Drivers	1	2	3	4	5	6	7	8	9	10	11	12	13	14	15	16	17	18	19	20	21	22	23	Points	WCC
2026	R26	AFR 26 Hybrid 1.6 V6 t	P		AUS	CHN	JPN	MIA	CAN	MON	BCN	AUT	GBR	BEL	HUN	NED	ITA	ESP	AZE	BHR	SIN	USA	MXC	SAP	LVG	QAT	ABU	28*	8th*
2026	R26	AFR 26 Hybrid 1.6 V6 t	P	(Brazil) Gabriel Bortoleto	9	DNS	13	12	13	11	11	11	8	8	11	13	11	13	15	18	Ret	13	8	16				28*	8th*
2026	R26	AFR 26 Hybrid 1.6 V6 t	P	(Germany) Nico Hülkenberg	DNS	11	11	Ret	12	13	Ret	12	Ret	13	9	8	12	10	11	11	8^{7}	11	14	10				28*	8th*

Notes

- * – Season still in progress.
